= Land reform in interwar Yugoslavia =

Agricultural reform in Yugoslavia, 1919–1941

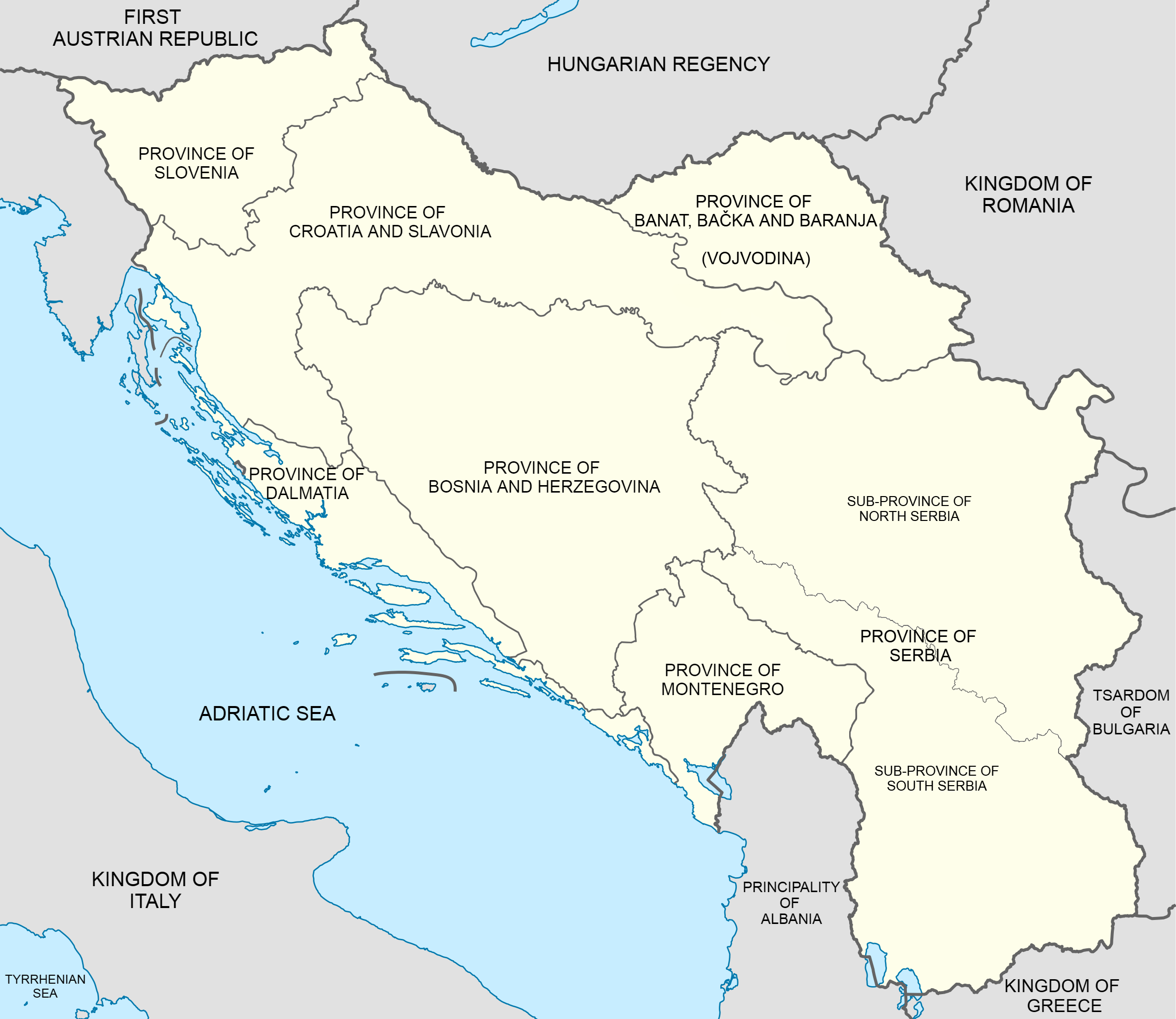
Provinces of the Kingdom of Serbs, Croats and Slovenes in 1918–1922

The land reform in interwar Yugoslavia was a process of redistribution of agricultural land in the Kingdom of Serbs, Croats and Slovenes (renamed Yugoslavia in 1929) carried out in the interwar period. The land reform's proclaimed social ideal was that the land belongs to those who work it. An unrealistically idyllic image of Serbian villages in the region of Šumadija was touted as the model of national awareness and peasant liberty sought by the reform, which was aimed at dismantling remnants of serfdom and sharecropping in parts of the country, as well as at breaking up large agricultural estates.

Approximately two thirds of the land expropriated and distributed by the land reform was located on the territory of the present-day Bosnia and Herzegovina. All parts of the country were subject to the reform, except the territory of the former Principality of Serbia (corresponding to the northern part of pre-World War I Serbia). A total of 1,924,307 hectares (4,755,070 acres) of land was redistributed, and more than 600,000 families received plots of land, through implementation of the reform.

Internal colonisation was a significant element of the land reform. It consisted of awarding the expropriated land to colonists—Royal Serbian Army volunteers, landless peasants resettled from poorer parts of the country, Yugoslav citizens moving to the country from neighbouring countries, and even those who usurped agricultural land on their own initiative and without any formal authorisation. Preference was given to the volunteers and supporters of the Yugoslav authorities. The colonisation process was used by the Yugoslav authorities as a means of ethnic engineering, seeking to increase the proportion of South Slavic peoples (predominantly Serbs), especially in border regions such as Banat, Bačka and Baranja and the present-day territories of Kosovo and North Macedonia. Most of the colonists arrived from Serbia.

Implementation of the land reform relied largely on the Interim Decree on the Preparation of the Agrarian Reform promulgated in 1919, supplemented by a number of ministerial-level orders and regulations. An act regulating the reform was enacted in 1931. The reform and colonisation were conducted against the backdrop of ethnic violence against the Moslem population in Bosnia and Herzegovina; in Kosovo, guerilla warfare waged by the Internal Macedonian Revolutionary Organisation; and civil unrest elsewhere. In Dalmatia, the reform was delayed by the question of the unresolved border with the Kingdom of Italy, relations with the Italian minority, and enjoyment of property rights of Italian citizens in Yugoslavia. The reform and colonisation contributed to ethnicisation of politics in Yugoslavia.

== Background ==
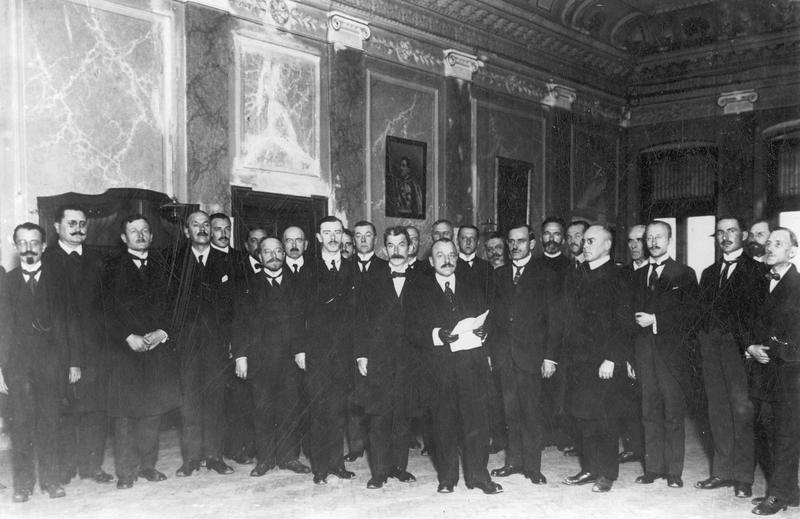
A delegation of the National Council of Slovenes, Croats and Serbs meeting Prince Regent Alexander in Belgrade on 1 December 1918

The Kingdom of Serbs, Croats and Slovenes (subsequently renamed Yugoslavia) was established by a proclamation of Prince Regent Alexander of Serbia on 1 December 1918. The proclamation was made in response to a petition presented by a delegation of the National Council of Slovenes, Croats and Serbs; it created a unified South Slavic state composed of the short-lived State of Slovenes, Croats and Serbs and the Kingdom of Serbia. Serbia had annexed the territories of Banat, Bačka and Baranja (also referred to as Vojvodina) and the Kingdom of Montenegro in the immediate aftermath of World War I. The additions of Vojvodina and Montenegro followed the annexation of Sandžak and areas of present-day Kosovo and North Macedonia in the immediate aftermath of the 1912–1913 Balkan Wars. Those territories were organised as the province of South Serbia. The State of Slovenes, Croats and Serbs comprised areas of the former Austria-Hungary that were inhabited by South Slavs, specifically in the Slovene Lands, Croatia-Slavonia, Dalmatia, and Austro-Hungarian Condominium of Bosnia and Herzegovina.

The provinces of Yugoslavia enjoyed different levels of development and had different legislation in place. The Slovene Lands were organised similarly to the Cisleithanian (Austrian) part of the former Austria-Hungary, while Croatia-Slavonia had been previously linked more closely to the Kingdom of Hungary. Ownership models resembling feudalism were widespread in Bosnia and Herzegovina, South Serbia, and Dalmatia. Bosnia and Herzegovina, as well as South Serbia, drew on their Ottoman heritage, but there were differences in various parts of those territories as well. Parts of Dalmatia were occupied by the Italian Army, which was attempting to enforce the Italian territorial award made under the Treaty of London.

No ethnic group constituted the majority of the population of Yugoslavia. The Serbs were the most numerous, accounting for almost 39% of inhabitants of the country. Croats and Slovenes constituted nearly 24% and 9% of the population, respectively. The first Yugoslav government considered the three groups as three "tribes" of a single nation, in line with the ideology of Yugoslavism. In practice, Serbs dominated the government, which became highly centralised. Parts of the country saw civil unrest, looting by armed groups, and revolutionary movements. In Croatia-Slavonia and in Vojvodina, those were largely associated with the Green Cadres or inspired by the Hungarian Soviet Republic. In South Serbia, Albanians in the Kachak Movement resisted the new state, and there was a pro-Bulgarian, anti-Yugoslav struggle championed by the Internal Macedonian Revolutionary Organisation (IMRO). In Montenegro, civil war, known as the Christmas Uprising, broke out.

== Aims of the reform ==
=== Interim Decree ===
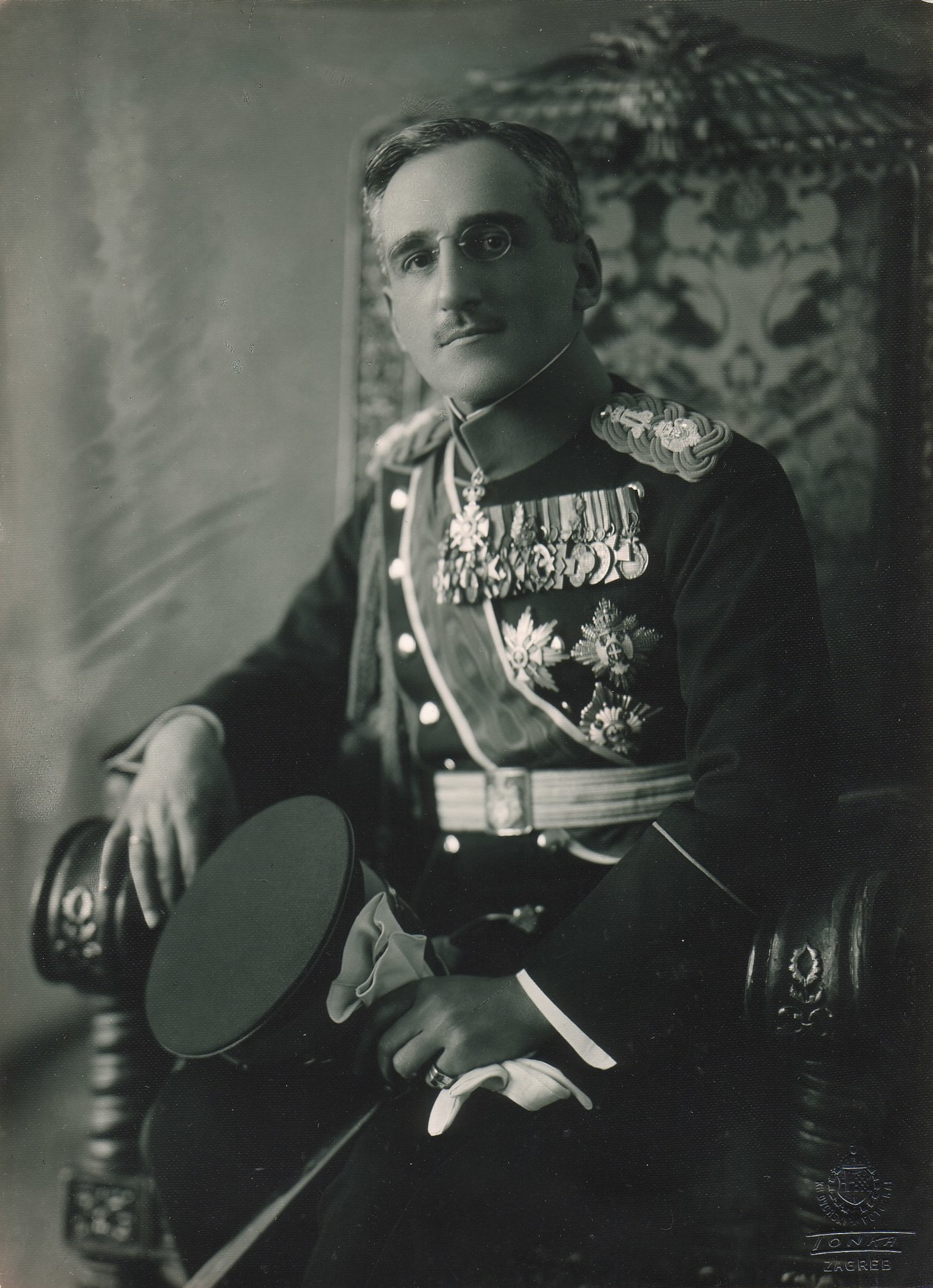
Regent Alexander called on a land reform in his manifesto of 6 January 1919.

The land reform was one of the first steps taken by the authorities of the newly established Yugoslavia. On 24 December 1918, within the four weeks following the proclamation of Yugoslavia, Regent Alexander issued a declaration asking peasants to calmly wait for the state to settle the agrarian question and give them land that will be "only God's and theirs". Two weeks later, on 6 January 1919, Alexander published a manifesto declaring his wish for an urgent and just agrarian reform. Alexander's manifesto was in line with the declaration of the Serbian government made in February 1917, after the Serbian defeat in the World War I Serbian campaign, promising land to those voluntarily joining the Royal Serbian Army. The manifesto was also in line with the November 1918 declaration of the National Council of Slovenes, Croats and Serbs. Faced with the civil unrest associated with the Green Cadres, the National Council promised land to every peasant. New Yugoslav authorities feared unrest caused by former soldiers returning to impoverished homes after the war, especially former prisoners of war captured by the Russian Empire who had seen the Bolshevik Revolution first hand. The main objective of the land reform appeared to be forging closer ties between the peasantry and the monarchy, to reduce the likelihood of a revolution.

According to historian Jozo Tomasevich, the most significant piece of land reform legislation was the Interim Decree on the Preparation of the Agrarian Reform (Prethodne odredbe za pripremu agrarne reforme) of 25 February 1919. The decree determined that the land belongs to the one who tills it, which was the ideological basis for the reform. It also prescribed the abolition of serfdom where it and similar systems existed. The decree also provided for the expropriation of large estates and the redistribution of that land to those who had none, giving preference to veterans. This led to about 70,000 people requesting recognition as volunteer army veterans, even though there were only about 25,000 actual volunteers. It further prescribed that the former owners of the land would be compensated, except if they were related to the House of Habsburg. Initially, the reform was overseen by the Ministry of Social Affairs. Social affairs minister and co-author of the Interim Decree Vitomir Korać unsuccessfully argued against compensation as "parliamentary and judicial nonsense". The two political parties having the most seats in the National Assembly supported the land reform, but took different approaches. The Democratic Party took the more radical approach to reform, while the People's Radical Party demanded full compensation for expropriated private property. In April 1919, the Ministry of Agrarian Reform was established, and the Temporary National Representation (the interim legislature) endorsed the Interim Decree without any discussion. The ministry argued that the urgency of the matter did not allow for regular procedure. Until 1931, reform was based on ministerial decisions and decrees. That year, legislation was enacted concluding the land reform.

=== Proclaimed social ideal ===
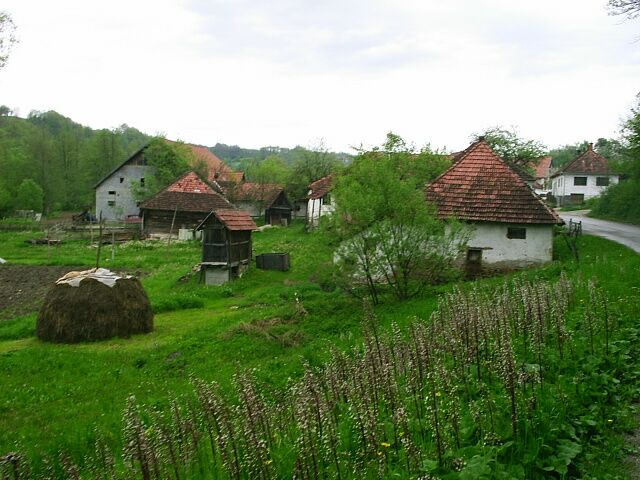
Villages in the region of Šumadija were presented as the idyllic role-model for the entire Yugoslav countryside.

According to economist Mijo Mirković, the government committed "a range of revolutionary acts" and went against its principles as it feared unrest among the peasants or even a revolution. Conversely, economist Doreen Warriner deemed the reform to be in line with similar processes in Eastern Europe at the time, which were marked by gradual development of agricultural relations rather than revolutionary change. The land reform was touted as the foundation of social concord, the source of power of the state, and the source of prosperity of the people, critical for peace in the country. It became a "sacred question" in politics. Scientific and economic justifications for the reform were made, even though there were no scientific analyses. Critics arguing that small plots would not be economically viable were discredited as anti-social, anti-cultural, and anti-national.

The Interim Decree exempted the territory of the former Principality of Serbia (the northern part of the pre–World War I Serbia) from the land reform. Instead, the territory was taken as the desired model of peasant land ownership. There, the feudal relations had been abolished in 1833, and small, peasant-owned plots created. That led to portrayals of the Serbian countryside as a "peasant paradise" defying the laws of capitalist economy and imparting national identity to the peasant landowners. The region of Šumadija was particularly glorified as the land of simple "illitierate peasants", where an indigenous land ownership model existed unlike foreign-invented ones found elsewhere in the country. In reality, the Serbian agricultural sector was highly dependent on government aid, and its poor production presented an obstacle to the modernisation of Serbian society.

According to historian Srđan Milošević, the Šumadija countryside was not selected because it was a particularly successful role-model, but because it was customary to extend solutions previously applied in Serbia to Yugoslavia. This was a product of Serbia's political position in the creation of Yugoslavia regardless of opposition from the majority of non-Serbs. As Serbian politicians insisted on political continuity between pre-unification Serbia and Yugoslavia, Serbian institutions and practices, including those of land ownership, were extended to the entirety of Yugoslavia. Contemporaries such as Nikola Stojanović spoke of its being Serbia's destiny, as its unifying power, to give direction to the new state, comparing Serbia to Piedmont, which was the driving force in the unification of Italy. In a speech of 16 March 1919, Regent Alexander asked for urgent land reform by application of the Serbian ownership model to other parts of Yugoslavia.

=== Internal colonisation ===
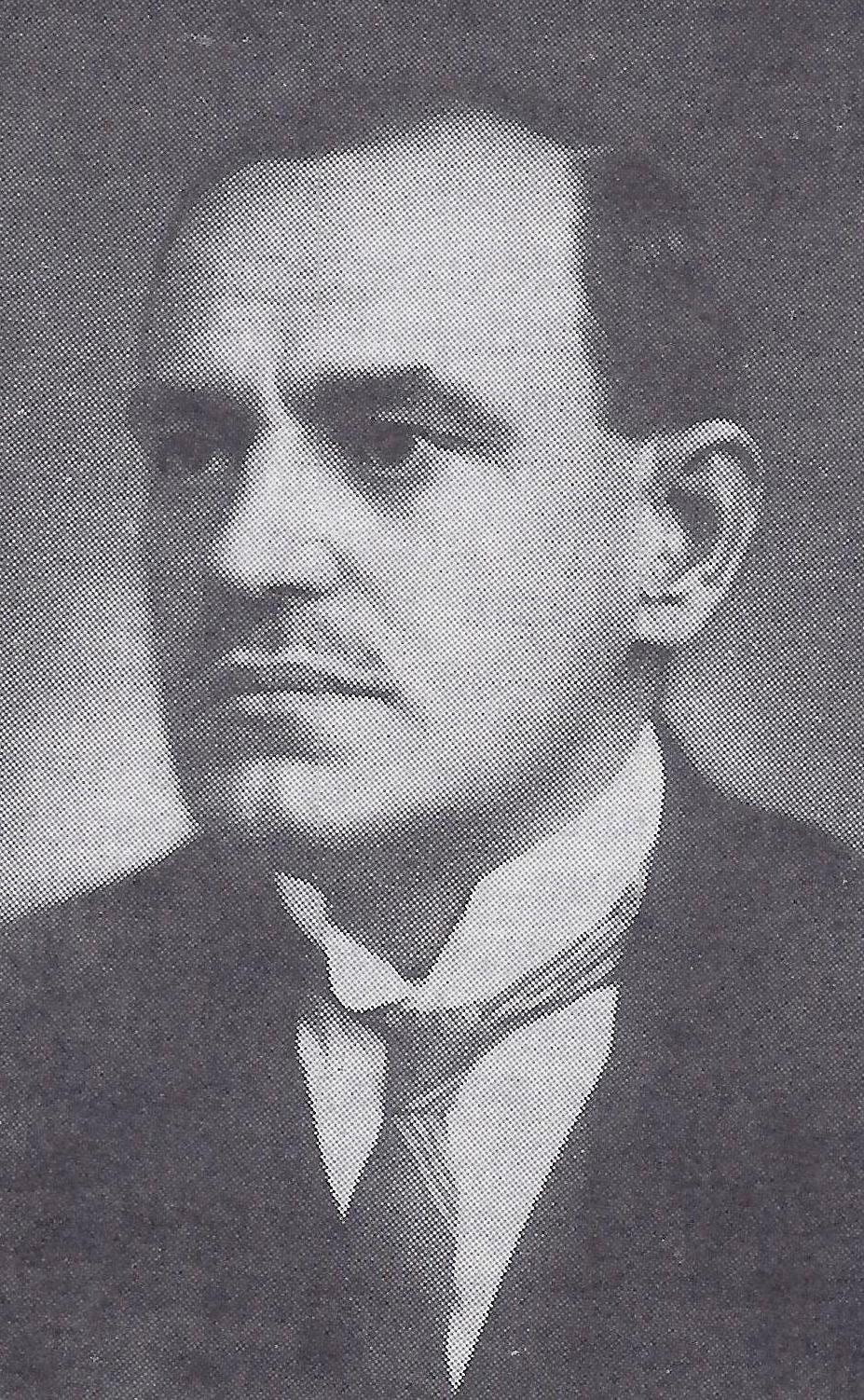
As a government minister, Svetozar Pribićević argued for internal colonisation along with the land reform.

Strengthening of the "national element" was made an integral part of the land reform in interwar Yugoslavia. A strong proponent of this development was the interior minister Svetozar Pribićević, who argued that colonisation was necessary for the reform to happen at all. The colonisation had a number of direct objectives. One was to increase the proportion of the South Slavic population in areas that were home to significant non-Slavic populations; it was to facilitate amalgamation of Serbs, Croats and Slovenes by mixing their populations; and it was meant to reduce emigration from Yugoslavia by providing an opportunity for people living in overpopulated areas where land was scarce. The colonisation process was to favour "nationally conscious", "reliable men", primarily referring to Serbs. The majority of the colonists, 76% of them, were drawn from Serbia and Montenegro. A further 11% came from Bosnia and Herzegovina. Authorities determined that the colonists were to be settled in specifically designated areas to avoid their dispersion in the areas of their settlement. The restriction was imposed in pursuit of the objective of maintaining pockets of ethnic homogenisation within ethnically mixed areas in border regions.

In addition to the state-organised colonisation, in the early years of the land reform, there were cases of usurpation of land. Some sources refer to such a population as the autokolonisti (autocolonists). Most such cases were observed in the north of the country (Vojvodina and Croatia-Slavonia), but also in the Neretva's delta in Dalmatia. Such cases were made legal by the order of the minister of agrarian reform, which recognised such claims land that had been occupied before the end of 1923. Furthermore, Yugoslav citizens resettling from Hungary or Romania were recognised as deserving to benefit from the reform and were awarded land.

== Implementation ==
=== Bosnia and Herzegovina ===
The agrarian issue had been part of the politics of Bosnia and Herzegovina since the 19th century. The nature of the local land ownership and management system stemmed from the Ottoman heritage. Therefore, the Chiflik system was in place, where the landowners were largely Muslims, while the peasants working the land were largely Christians. Austro-Hungarian occupation and annexation of Bosnia-Herzegovina did not bring about substantial changes in legislation or practice of land ownership. At the same time, Austro-Hungarian authorities made it possible for serfs to purchase land from landowners, offering them loans for the purpose. However, the scheme accomplished little since available funds were inadequate, at least until 1910. A census taken in Bosnia and Herzegovina in 1895 recorded 88,970 serf families. By 1914, approximately 42,500 serf families had purchased their own land.

Approximately two thirds of the land affected by the interwar land reform was located in Bosnia and Herzegovina. A total of 1,175,305 hectares (2,904,240 acres), representing 23% of the total territory of Bosnia and Herzegovina, was expropriated for redistribution. Overall, 1,286,227 hectares (3,178,340 acres) were distributed to 249,580 families. Implementation of the reform in Bosnia and Herzegovina was accompanied by widespread inter-ethnic violence, as the Bosnian Serbs attacked Muslim farmers and landowners. By mid-1919, about 2,000 Muslims had been killed, more than 4,000 families driven from their homes, and 400,000 hectares (990,000 acres) of land seized. The Muslims were targeted not only as landowners, but also because of their ethnicity. The authorities recognised peasants forcefully usurping land as legitimate beneficiaries of the reform. Such policy also led to conflicts with the army, as peasants usurped parts of military training grounds. There were numerous incursions from Montenegro into Herzegovina, where Montenegrins killed Muslims and looted property. The Yugoslav military deployed troops to curb such attacks, but killings continued into the mid-1920s. The conflicts related to implementation of the land reform increasingly took on the character of an ethnic, anti-Muslim struggle. This was especially true for organisations such as the Association of Serbian Chetniks Petar Mrkonjić, the Organization of Yugoslav Nationalists, and the Serbian National Youth. Historian Ivo Banac attributed some of the violence to revenge against the Muslim population for their wartime support of the Austro-Hungarian occupation of Serbia, or their participation in the Austro-Hungarian auxiliary militia (Schutzkorps).

Former landowners were promised compensation in the amount of 255 million dinars paid over a 40-year period, along with 6% interest. The payments only started in 1936 and stopped in 1941 with the World War II invasion of Yugoslavia. Only 10% of the expected amount was paid. The interwar land reform weakened the existing political and intellectual elite of Bosnia and Herzegovina's Muslim population, while strengthening the position of the Christian population. The land reform, and the violence associated with it, prompted a portion of Muslim population of Bosnia and Herzegovina to emigrate to Turkey.

=== Vojvodina ===
The colonisation of Vojvodina, a territory that passed from Hungarian to Serbian (and subsequently Yugoslav) control following the 1918 Armistice of Belgrade, was a significant element of the interwar land reform in Yugoslavia. The region was predominantly inhabited by Hungarians and Danube Swabians (Germans) as well as Serbs. Yugoslav authorities confiscated many Hungarian-owned farms and turned the land over to Serbs, which left many homeless. At the same time, the authorities closed down all primary and secondary schools in Vojvodina teaching in the Hungarian language. Civil unrest during 1919, and a Hungarian uprising in the city of Subotica on 21 April 1920, prompted the Yugoslav authorities to deploy 20,000 troops to pacify the area. There were proposals to make it possible for Vojvodina's German population to receive land through the reform, but only in areas south of the Sava and Danube rivers. The scheme envisaged that the German population would be useful in promoting culture and technical and professional knowledge among the rest of the population. However, applications for awards of plots submitted by Hungarians and Germans were normally disregarded. Instead, by 1924, in the period when it was possible to opt to leave Yugoslavia and go to the "mother" country, about 30,000 German-speaking residents and approximately 45,000 Hungarians left Vojvodina.

In Vojvodina, estates exceeding 320 hectares (790 acres) were subject to expropriation and redistribution under the reform. This resulted in the seizure of 222,707 hectares (550,320 acres) of land, which was distributed to 100,004 families. The process involved the hiring 16,000 additional (largely Serb) officials to manage the reform in Vojvodina and the establishment of 130 new villages. The new bureaucrats replaced purged ethnic Hungarian and German officials. The reform also led to an increase of the proportion of Serbs in the total population of Vojvodina, from 34% to 38%, between 1910 and 1930. At the same time, Hungarians and Germans lost their privileged status in the region, while Serbs received privileges. According to historian Branko Petranović, the population exchange was encouraged by the Yugoslav government as a means of strengthening the government's control over Vojvodina and to lessen the influence of minorities. In 1930, state secretary Slavko Šećerov claimed that the main objective of the reform in Vojvodina was to ruin the wealthy non-Slavic landowners, while other aspects were of secondary importance. In the process, Vojvodina's agricultural production declined. In the 1920s, the number of cattle and pigs in the region dropped by more than 40%.

=== South Serbia ===
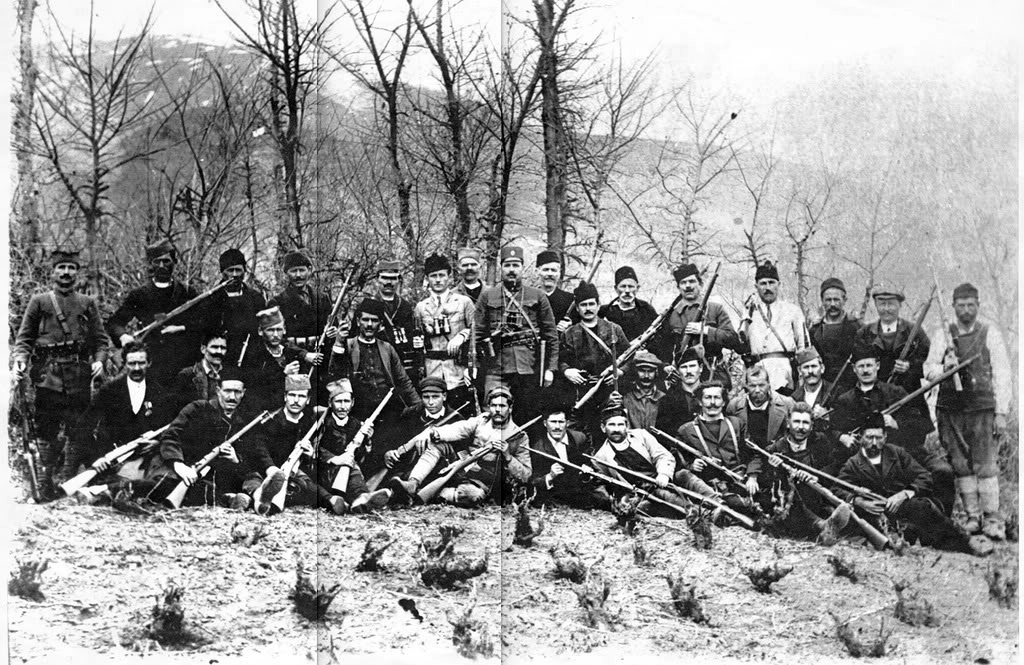
Association against Bulgarian Bandits fighters in 1920s

The territories acquired by Serbia through the Balkan Wars (subsequently organised as the province of South Serbia) had a non-Serb majority. In 1912–1914, until the outbreak of the World War I, Serbian authorities repressed the non-Serb majority and embarked upon a campaign of Serbianisation that caused thousands of Macedonians to flee to Bulgaria. In 1914, Serbia embarked upon the organised colonisation of the territories corresponding to present-day Kosovo and North Macedonia.

Colonisation and redistribution resumed in South Serbia after World War I. During the course of the interwar land reform, 231,099 hectares (571,060 acres) were expropriated and distributed to 48,261 families. The area included more than a third of the total agricultural land in the province. Half of the expropriated land was distributed to the local population, while the other half went to colonists, mostly ethnic Serbs and Montenegrins. The colonists were mainly drawn from Herzegovina, Montenegro, and Lika. Most colonists had to build their own homes, but nearly 3,000 houses were built for them by the state or with state support. Substantial land was given to government agencies, the army, and the gendarmerie. At the same time, 200,000–300,000 Muslim Albanians and Turks emigrated from Sandžak and Kosovo to Albania and Turkey, due to violence and persecution. An additional aim of the land reform in the province was to compel Albanians to emigrate by leaving them plots of land too small to provide secure livelihoods. In mid-1930s, Yugoslavia was negotiating with Turkey on the removal of 200,000 Albanians from Kosovo to Turkey. Between 1918 and 1921, the Albanian population in the territory of present-day Kosovo was nearly halved.

About 10,000 armed Albanians resisted Yugoslav rule through the unsuccessful rebellion by the Kaçak Movement. In response, in January and February 1919, government troops killed more than 6,000 people and destroyed more than 3,800 houses in Kosovo. Land owned by peasants deemed outlaws was seized by the state. The Yugoslav government planned to settle 50,000 colonists in Vardar Macedonia, but only 4,200 colonist households were established in the region. The colonisation of Vardar Macedonia was opposed by the IMRO through guerrilla warfare. As a consequence, the province was garrisoned by about 50,000 Royal Yugoslav Army troops, gendarmes, military police, and armed members of the state-sponsored Association against Bulgarian Bandits. By 1923, the IMRO had built a force of more than 9,000, relying on bases in the neighbouring Pirin Macedonia region of Bulgaria. In Sandžak, there was also violence against the Muslim civilian population, such as the Šahovići massacre in 1924.

=== Croatia-Slavonia ===
During the interwar land reform, 110,577 hectares (273,240 acres) were expropriated and distributed to 99,908 families in Croatia-Slavonia. Agricultural estates exceeding 150 hectares (370 acres) and 200 hectares (490 acres) were subject to redistribution in Central Croatia and Slavonia, respectively. According to Croatian economist Ivan Mandić, approximately 40,000 colonists immigrated to Slavonia in that period. The reform meant expropriation of agricultural land granted by the former Austro-Hungarian authorities in perpetuity to churches, schools, hospitals, and libraries in Croatia, depriving such institutions of independent income.

Expropriation of the large estates contributed to the weakening of the political power of landowners. Approximately one half of the land was distributed to the local population, while the remainder was given to colonists arriving from Bosnia and Herzegovina, and the Lika and Kordun regions of Croatia-Slavonia, Dalmatia, and Montenegro. Some of the colonists were refugees from Istria, and formerly expatriate South Slavs moving to the country from Hungary. In practice, preference in the distribution of land was given to supporters of the central government. The bulk of the interwar colonisation in Croatia-Slavonia took place between 1919 and 1924, against the backdrop of the Green Cadres violence and the 1920 Croatian Peasant Rebellion. Usurpation of privately owned land, especially forests, in expectation of the legalisation of possession taken by force, became common shortly after the announcement of the intended land reform. In late 1920s and in 1930s, a portion of the expropriated land was returned to the original landowners. A high profile case involved 30,000 hectares (74,000 acres) of land owned by the House of Thurn und Taxis. The ensuing highly-publicised Thurn and Taxis Affair involving bribery and corrupt dealings led to collapse of the Yugoslav cabinet.

=== Dalmatia ===
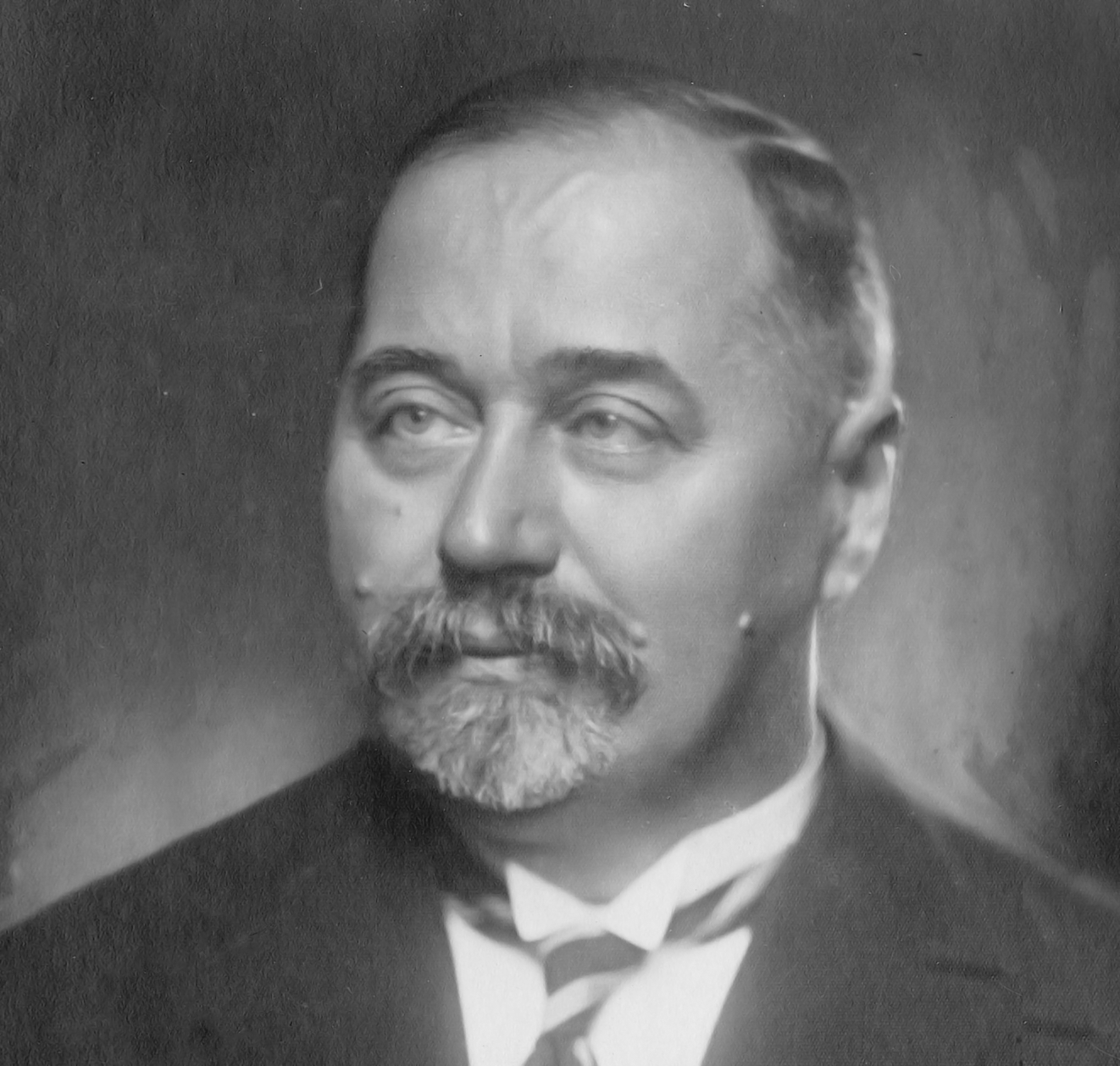
Stjepan Radić opposed ratification of the Treaty of Nettuno, which provided an interim solution for extension of the land reform to Italian citizens in Yugoslavia.

The Austrian Empire had abolished serfdom in the mid-19th century, but it exempted Dalmatia from that reform. The practice of corvée was abolished in the province in 1878, but sharecropping and various other types of tenancy resembling feudal or pre-feudal systems remained in place. In early 1920s, more than 40% of arable land in Dalmatia was worked by landless peasants through application of such tenancy relations. Following the royal manifesto of January 1919 and the Interim Decree, peasants largely stopped paying rent for the land, in breach of their contracts, believing they would become the owners. However, application of the Interim Decree was suspended in Dalmatia by the provincial government at the request of the Allies of World War I. The reason for the suspension was the unresolved status of Dalmatia regarding the award promised to Italy under the Treaty of London, as an incentive to join the Allies. While the Italo-Yugoslav border was settled in 1920 under the Treaty of Rapallo, the territory of Dalmatia promised by the Treaty of London was occupied by Italy until 1923. The difficult economic situation in Dalmatia caused more than 15,000 people to emigrate to the United States, Canada, South America, Australia, and New Zealand between 1920 and 1928.

Conclusion of the Treaty of Nettuno between Italy and Yugoslavia, of 20 July 1925, further complicated agrarian issues in Dalmatia. The treaty secured the rights of the Italian minority in Yugoslavia without providing for reciprocal rights of Croat and Slovene minorities in Italy, and the Stjepan Radić-led Croatian Peasant Party blocked treaty ratification until 1928. Through the treaty, Italy and Yugoslavia reached an interim agreement on the method of expropriation of Italian-owned land in Dalmatia encompassing approximately 13,000 hectares (32,000 acres). The agreement stipulated that expropriation of Italian-owned land could only take place with the consent of the landowners until a further agreement could be finalised. That came about on 19 May 1939, providing that provisions of Yugoslav law applied equally to Italian citizens who owned land in Yugoslavia—except that they were exempt from taxation of compensation paid for the expropriated land and allowed to take the compensation out of the country either as securities or cash.

In Dalmatia, a total of 50,000 hectares (120,000 acres) of land was expropriated and distributed to 96,953 families through the land reform. The former landowners received compensation in different forms. Dalmatia-specific legislation enacted in 1930 and 1931 determined that the owners of large estates would be compensated in government bonds nominally worth 400 million dinars. The bonds were to be redeemed over 30 years and charged to the recipients of the land together with interest and taxes. Other recipients of land were required to pay a portion of the estimated value of the land immediately, and the rest over 10 years.

== Results ==
Over the course of the interwar land reform, 1,924,307 hectares (4,755,070 acres) of land were expropriated and distributed to 614,603 families. The reform distributed the land previously managed as Muslim properties in Bosnia and Herzegovina, present-day Kosovo and North Macedonia, and in the region of Sandžak. It also parceled out land previously owned by the Croatian nobility and other large estates in former Austro-Hungarian lands: Vojvodina, Croatia-Slavonia, Dalmatia, and the Slovene Lands.

The accompanying process of colonisation was poorly organised and led to legal uncertainty regarding the colonists' rights and the inability of the colonists to run productive farms due to lack of farming knowledge and experience or to awards of unsuitable land. The central role of the colonisation in the land reform was the result of Yugoslav government's desire to pursue ethnic politics through ethnic and cultural consolidation of national territory. Alignment of socio-economic issues with ethnic affiliations contributed to the ethnicisation of Yugoslav politics.

== Sources ==
- Banac, Ivo (1984). The National Question in Yugoslavia: Origins, History, Politics. Ithaca, New York: Cornell University Press. ISBN 0-8014-1675-2.
- Banić, Petra; Peklić, Ivan (2015). "Agrarna reforma poslije Prvog svjetskog rata i Grkokatolička biskupija: osvrt na provedbu u sjevernoj Hrvatskoj" [The Agrarian Reform After the First World War and the Greek Catholic Diocese (Review of the Implementation in Northern Croatia)]. Cris (in Croatian). 17 (1). Križevci: Povijesno društvo Križevci: 25–39. ISSN 1332-2567.
- Buchenau, Klaus (2023). From Grand Estates to Grand Corruption; The Battle Over the Possessions of Prince Albert of Thurn and Taxis in Interwar Yugoslavia. Paderborn: Brill Schöningh. ISBN 978-3-506-79042-2.
- Drakić, Gordana (2008). "Kolonizacija u međuratnoj jugoslavenskoj državi" [Colonization in Kingdom of Serbs, Croats and Slovenes (Yugoslavia 1918–1941.)]. Proceedings of the Faculty of Law (in Serbian). 42 (3). Novi Sad: University of Novi Sad: 265–277. doi:10.5937/zrpfns42-0068 (inactive 12 July 2025). ISSN 0550-2179.
- Giordano, Christian (2014). "The Ethnicization of Agrarian Reforms: The Case of Interwar Yugoslavia". Martor. Revue d'Anthropologie du Musée du Paysan Roumain (19). Bucharest: Romanian Peasant Museum: 31–42. ISSN 1224-6271.
- Grgić, Stipica (2020). "The kingdom of diversity and paternalism: The Kingdom of Serbs, Croats and Slovenes/Yugoslavia, 1918–1941". In Ramet, Sabrina P. (ed.). Interwar Easte Central Europe, 1918–1941. Abingdon-on-Thames: Routledge. pp. 213–248. ISBN 978-0-367-13570-6.
- Hoare, Marko Attila (2024). Serbia: A Modern History. London: Hurst Publishers. ISBN 9781805261575.
- Kocsis, Károly (1994). "Contribution to the Background of the Ethnic Conflicts in the Carpathian Basin". GeoJournal. 32 (4). Berlin: Springer Science+Business Media: 425–433. Bibcode:1994GeoJo..32..425K. doi:10.1007/BF00807363. ISSN 0343-2521. JSTOR 41146185.
- Laušić, Ante (1989). "Osnovne značajke kolonizacijskih procesa na jugoslavenskom prostoru 1918–1948" [The Basic Characteristics of Colonisation Processes on the Territory of Yugoslavia from 1918 to 1948]. Migracijske i etničke teme (in Croatian). 5 (1). Zagreb: Institut za istraživanje migracija: 27–42. doi:10.11567/met. ISSN 1333-2546.
- Mandić, Ivan (1992). "Demografska strategija istočne Hrvatske" [Demographic Strategy of East Croatia]. Ekonomski Vjesnik: Review of Contemporary Entrepreneurship, Business, and Economic Issues (in Croatian). 5 (1). Osijek: University of Osijek: 5–9. ISSN 1847-2206.
- Miletić, Aleksandar R. (2005). "Afera "Turn-Taksis"" [The Turn-Taxis Family Affair]. Puls (in Serbian) (1–2). Belgrade: Centar za menadžment: 48–49. ISSN 1451-3579.
- Milošević, Srđan (2010). "The Agrarian Reform – A 'Divine Thing'". In Müller, Dietmar; Harre, Angela (eds.). Rural History Yearbook / Jahrbuch für Geschichte des ländlichen Raumes: Transforming Rural Societies. Innsbruck: Studienverlag. pp. 47–62. doi:10.25365/rhy-2010-4. ISBN 978-3-7065-4950-9.
- Milošević, Srđan (2013). "Национални аспект дебате о аграрној реформи и колонизацији у Краљевини СХС (1919–1920. године)" [Ideological Foundations of Land Reform and Colonization in the Kingdom of Serbs, Croats and Slovenes: National Aspect]. Tokovi Istorije (in Serbian) (2). Belgrade: Institut za noviju istoriju Srbije: 53–74. doi:10.31212/tokovi.2013.2.mil.53-74. ISSN 0354-6497.
- Morawski, Wojciech (2019). "Agrarian reforms in Interwar Europe". Kwartalnik Kolegium Ekonomiczno-Społecznego "Studia i Prace". 38 (38). Warsaw: Szkoła Główna Handlowa w Warszawie: 11–27. ISSN 2082-0976.
- Mutapčić, Edin (2011). "Pravno-historijski kontekst agrarne reforme u BiH poslije Prvog svjetskog rata" [Legal and Historical Context of the Agrarian Reform in Bosnia and Herzegovina after the First World War]. Tranzicija (in Bosnian). 13 (27). Tuzla: Univerzitet FINRA: 143–156. ISSN 1512-5785.
- Portmann, Michael (2016). "'Ethnic cleansing' in peacetime? Yugoslav/Serb colonization projects in Vojvodina in the twentieth century". Journal of Genocide Research. 18 (4). Abingdon-on-Thames: Routledge: 447–462. doi:10.1080/14623528.2016.1227561. ISSN 1462-3528.
- Rafailović, Jelena (2016). "Аграрна реформа и индустријализација у Краљевини СХС – студија случаја поседа Ђорђа Дунђерског" [Agrarian Reform and Industrialization in the Kingdom of SCS – Land Property of Đorđe Dunđerski: the Case Study]. Tokovi Istorije (in Serbian) (2). Belgrade: Institut za noviju istoriju Srbije: 93–120. doi:10.31212/tokovi.2016.2.raf.93-120. ISSN 0354-6497.
- Ramet, Sabrina P. (1995). Social Currents in Eastern Europe: The Sources and Consequences of the Great Transformation. Durham: Duke University Press. ISBN 9780822315483.
- Ramet, Sabrina P. (2006). The Three Yugoslavias: State-Building and Legitimation, 1918–2005. Bloomington: Indiana University Press. ISBN 978-0-253-34656-8.
- Repe, Božo (2024). "The Slovenes and the Controversy Over Borders with Italy and Austria after the First World War". In Bianchini, Stefano (ed.). Italy, Yugoslavia, and the Controversy Over the Adriatic Region, 1915-1920. Abingdon-on-Thames: Taylor & Francis. pp. 62–84. ISBN 9781040124352.
- Rothschild, Joseph (1974). East Central Europe Between the Two World Wars. Seattle: University of Washington Press. ISBN 9780295953571.
- Šimončić-Bobetko, Zdenka (1989). "Agrarno pitanje u Dalmaciji između dva rata (1918—1941)" [The Agrarian Question in Dalmatia Between the Two Wars (1918—1941)]. Povijesni prilozi (in Croatian). 8 (8). Zagreb: Hrvatski institut za povijest: 91–141. doi:10.22586/pp. ISSN 0351-9767.
- Šimončić-Bobetko, Zdenka (1990). "Kolonizacija u Hrvatskoj 1919.—1941. godine" [Colonization in Croatia Between 1919 and 1941]. Povijesni prilozi (in Croatian). 9 (9). Zagreb: Hrvatski institut za povijest: 85–164. ISSN 0351-9767.
- Thompson, Sarahelen (1993). "Agrarian Reform in Eastern Europe Following World War I: Motives and Outcomes". American Journal of Agricultural Economics. 75 (3). New York City: Wiley: 840–844. doi:10.2307/1243605. ISSN 0002-9092. JSTOR 1243605.
- Velagić, Adnan (2009). "Sprovođenje agrarne reforme i djelovanje komitskih četa u Hercegovini nakon Prvog svjetskog rata" [Realisation of Agrarian Reform and Actions of Brigand Units in Herzegovina after World War I]. Prilozi (in Bosnian) (38). Sarajevo: Institut za istoriju: 121–143. ISSN 0350-1159.
- Warriner, Doreen (1959). "Urban Thinkers and Peasant Policy in Yugoslavia, 1918-59". The Slavonic and East European Review. 38 (90). London: UCL School of Slavonic and East European Studies: 59–81. ISSN 0037-6795. JSTOR 4205120.
