= Seta (disambiguation) =

Seta is a bristle in plants and animals.

Seta may also refer to:

== Places ==
- Seta, Greece, a village in Euboea, Greece
- Šėta, a town in Lithuania
- Seta District, Gunma, in Japan
- Seta River or Yodo River
- Sète, a town in France

== Other uses ==
- Seta (surname)
- Seta (organization), a Finnish LGBTI rights organization
- SETA (contractor), civilian employees of government contractors
- SETA Corporation, a Japanese computer game developer
- Seta language, a Torricelli language of Papua New Guinea
- Search for Extraterrestrial Artifacts (SETA), a project in Xenoarchaeology
- Sector Education and Training Authority in South Africa
- SETA, a Turkish-language abbreviation for Foundation for Political, Economic and Social Research, a Turkish think tank
- Seta (song), a song by Italian singer Elisa

== See also ==
- Setta, a surname
- Settai (disambiguation)
- Ceta (disambiguation)
- Sita (disambiguation)
- Seto (disambiguation)
