= Živojin Lazić =

Serbian and Yugoslav politician

- Живојин Лазић
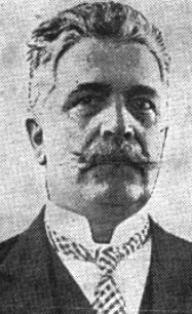
- Živojin Lazić

Minister of the Interior
- In office 2 July 1932 – 20 December 1934
- Prime Minister: Vojislav Marinković; Milan Srškić; Nikola Uzunović
- Preceded by: Milan Srškić
- Succeeded by: Velimir Popović

Ban of the Vardar Banovina
- In office 9 October 1929 – 1932
- Preceded by: Position established
- Succeeded by: Dobrica Matković

Personal details
- Born: 12 February 1876 Svračkovci, Principality of Serbia
- Died: 7 November 1958 (aged 82) Montreal, Quebec, Canada
- Party: Yugoslav National Party
- Education: University of Belgrade

Živojin "Žika" Lazić (Serbian Cyrillic: Живојин Жика Лазић; 12 February 1876 – 7 November 1958) was a Serbian and Yugoslav politician who served as the first Ban of Vardar Banovina from 1929 to 1932 and the Minister of the Interior from 1932 to 1934.

== Biography ==
Lazić was born in 1876 in Svračkovci, near Gornji Milanovac. He graduated from the Faculty of Law, University of Belgrade and later specialized in the field of national security in Germany, Italy and Austria-Hungary. From 1919 to 1921, he was the head of the Public Security Department of the Ministry of the Interior.

In September 1923, he founded the Association against Bulgarian Bandits, an organization whose goal was to prevent the support of the Macedonian population for the Internal Macedonian Revolutionary Organization (IMRO). Prime Minister Ljubomir Davidović openly disagreed with Lazić's decision to appoint former IMRO members Stoyan Mishev and Grigor Tsiklev to head the organization, to which Lazić replied that "he did not find a better mechanism than the mutual extermination of former and current Bulgarian komitadjis." In 1923, he also led the Yugoslav delegation to a conference that led to the signing of the Treaty of Niš, and was then appointed Deputy Minister of the Interior. In 1927, he participated as a public prosecutor in the Skopje Student Trial against the Macedonian Youth Secret Revolutionary Organization members. On 13 July 1928, under the orders of Ivan Mihailov, IMRO member Ivan Momchilov carried out an unsuccessful assassination attempt against Lazić. Momchilov entered Lazić's office in Belgrade, shot him in the head, and then committed suicide. Lazić was badly wounded, but still survived.

In 1929, Živojin Lazic was appointed Ban of the Vardar Banovina with its headquarters in Skopje. He was in the leadership of the local board of the Soko organization and Narodna Odbrana. In the period from 2 July 1932 to 20 December 1934, he served the Minister of the Interior in the government led by the Yugoslav National Party.

At the end of World War II and the establishment of the new communist regime, Lazić left Yugoslavia and went overseas to Canada. He died in Montréal in 1958 at the age of 82, where he was buried.

== Literature ==
- Petrov, Peter (1998). Македония: история и политическа съдба. Vol. 2. Изд-во "Знание" ООД.
- Kumanov, Milev (1993). Македония: кратък исторически справочник. Издателска къща "ТИНАПРЕС". ISBN 978-954-8309-05-9.
