= Emanuel Čučkov =

Macedonian statesman (1901-1967)

- Емануел Чучков
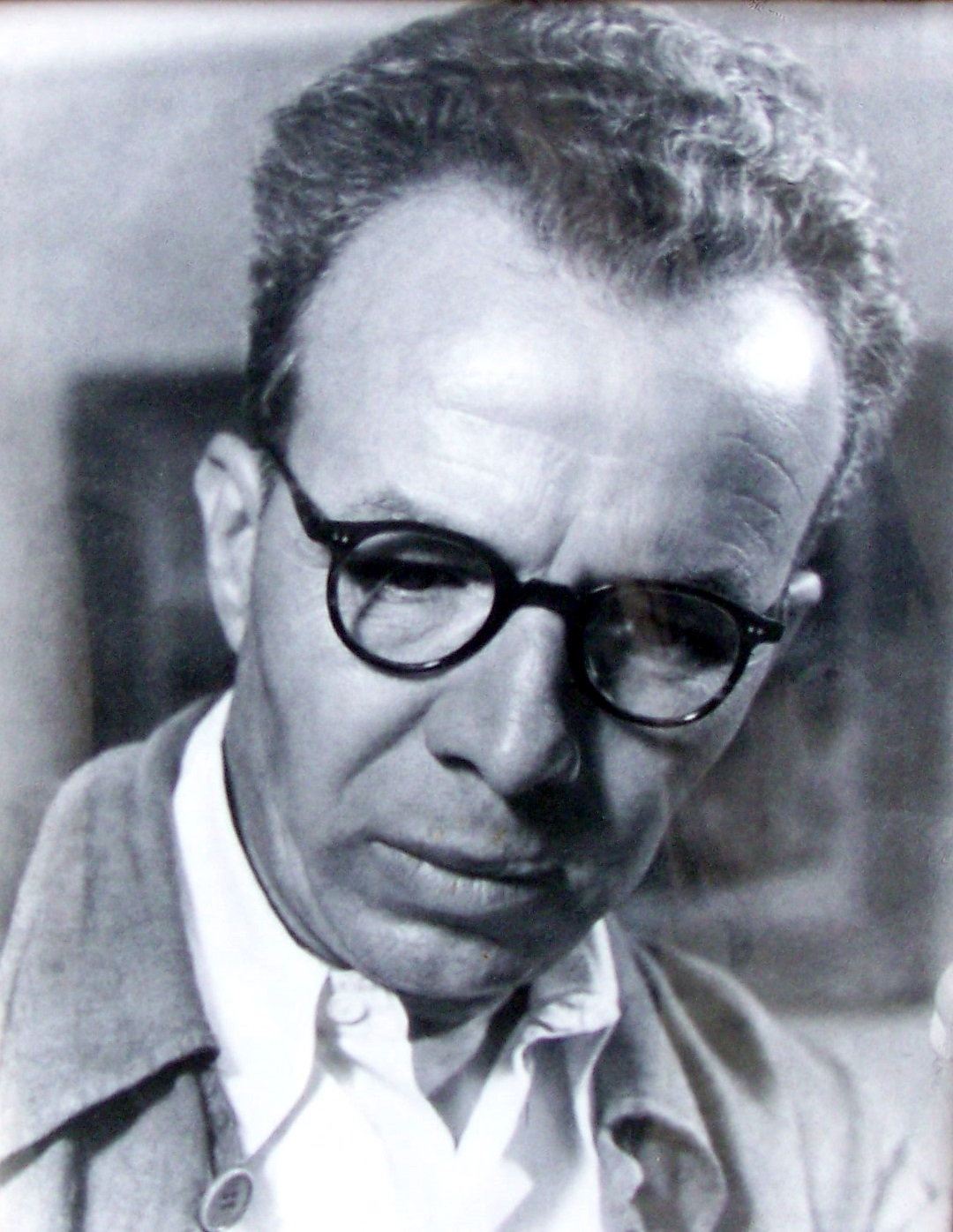

Minister for Macedonia in the Provisional Government of the Democratic Federal Yugoslavia
- In office 7 March 1945 – 16 April 1945

Personal details
- Born: 27 November 1901 Novo Selo, Štip, Ottoman Empire
- Died: 1 September 1967 (aged 65) Skopje, SFR Yugoslavia
- Party: Communist Party of Yugoslavia

Emanuel Hristov Čučkov (Macedonian: Емануел Христов Чучков; 27 November 1901 – 1 September 1967) also known as Mane Čučkov (Macedonian: Мане Чучков) was a Macedonian statesman, partisan, author and professor.

== Biography ==
=== Early life ===
Čučkov was born in Novo Selo, near Štip, then in the Ottoman Empire. He received his elementary education in Novo Selo and continued his education in Štip and Skopje. In 1919 he joined a socialist revolutionary circle. He agitated with the circle during the 1920 Kingdom of Serbs, Croats and Slovenes Constitutional Assembly election. Due to his activity, Čučkov was arrested in 1921, however he was quickly released. In 1923 he joined the Macedonian Youth Secret Revolutionary Organization. He was arrested again in 1924, although he was swiftly released. Čučkov graduated from the Faculty of Philosophy in Belgrade in 1925. In 1927 he was involved in the Skopje Student Trial, during which he was tortured by the Serbian police, but was released without charges due to lack of evidence.

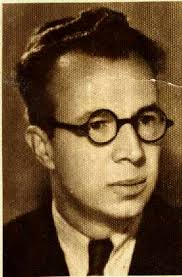
Čučkov as a high school professor in Skopje, circa 1935.

Prior to his arrest, Čučkov worked as a substitute teacher in Ohrid. After becoming a high school professor, he worked in Belgrade, Svilajnac, Čačak, Bijeljina, Štip, Smederevska Palanka, Ćuprija and Skopje. In 1937 Čučkov got into contact with MANAPO, and later with the Communist Party of Yugoslavia.

=== During World War II ===
In 1941, after the capitulation of Yugoslavia and the subsequent occupation of Vardar Macedonia, Čučkov went to Sofia and got his teaching license. Due to being a former member of the MYSRO and related to IMORO revolutionary Efrem Čučkov, he was appointed by the Bulgarian authorities as director at the gymnasium in Prilep and later at a gymnasium in Skopje.

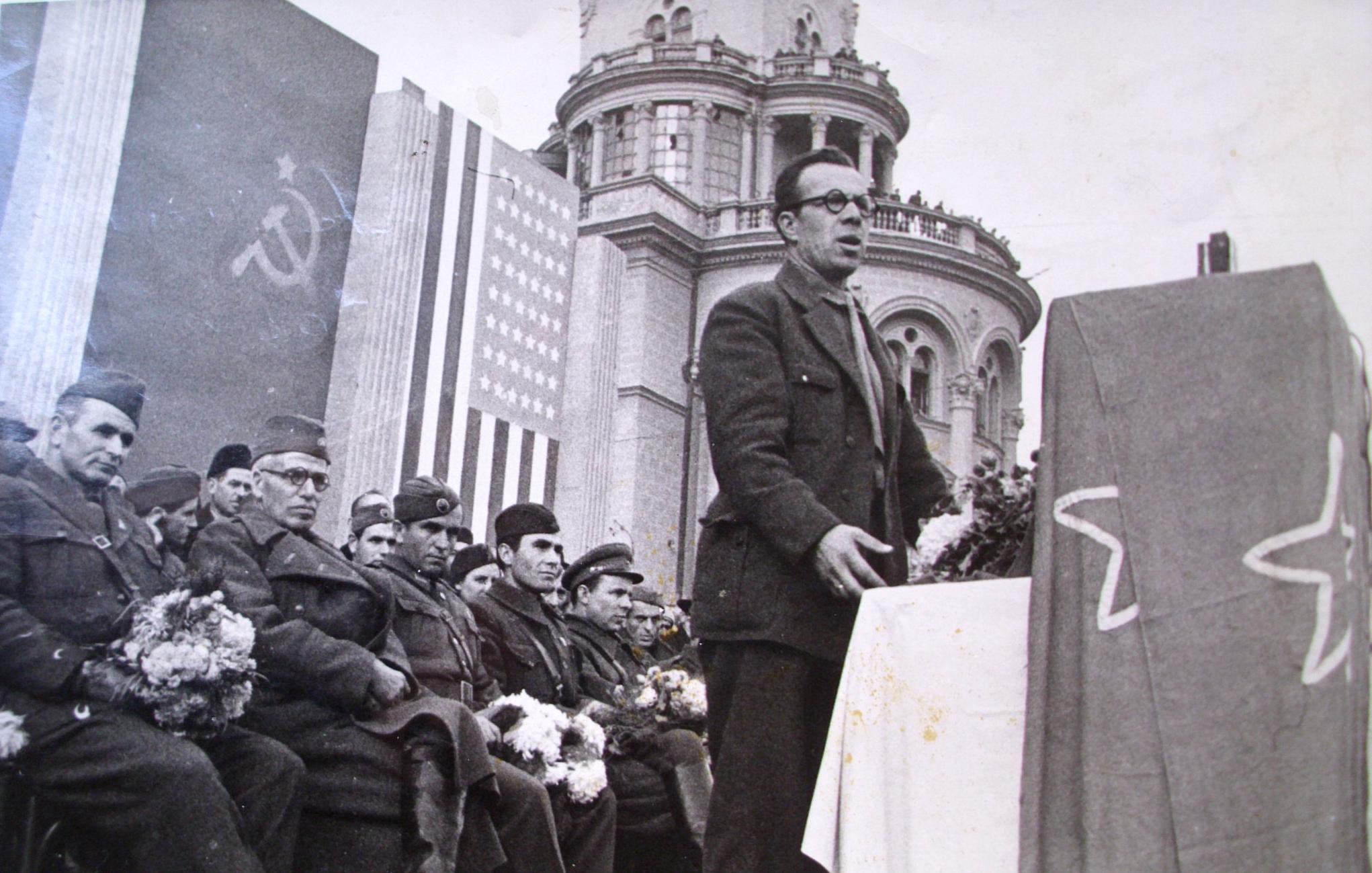
Čučkov giving a speech in Skopje, 1945.

In the autumn of 1943 he joined the Communist Party of Macedonia and became a member of an informal group called the "Action national-liberation Committee" (ANOK) within the party, which agitated for the independence of a united Macedonia. In April 1944 he became a member of the Initiative committee for the organization of the Antifascist Assembly of the National Liberation of Macedonia (ASNOM). In June, Čučkov, along with Metodija Andonov - Čento and Kiril Petrušev met with Josip Broz Tito on the island of Vis for consultations due to their activity. He participated during the first session of ASNOM, and was elected as second vice presidents of the Presidium of ASNOM. On August 14, the Presidium of ASNOM elected him as a member of the commission for determining the offenses of the occupiers and their servants. Čučkov was also elected as a commissioner for agriculture of the National Committee for the Liberation of Yugoslavia. After the formation of the Provisional Government of the Democratic Federal Yugoslavia he became the minister for Macedonia. However, due to his agitation for an independent and united Macedonia, his stances were deemed nationalist, separatist and anti-Yugoslav, and he was removed from the post.

=== After World War II ===
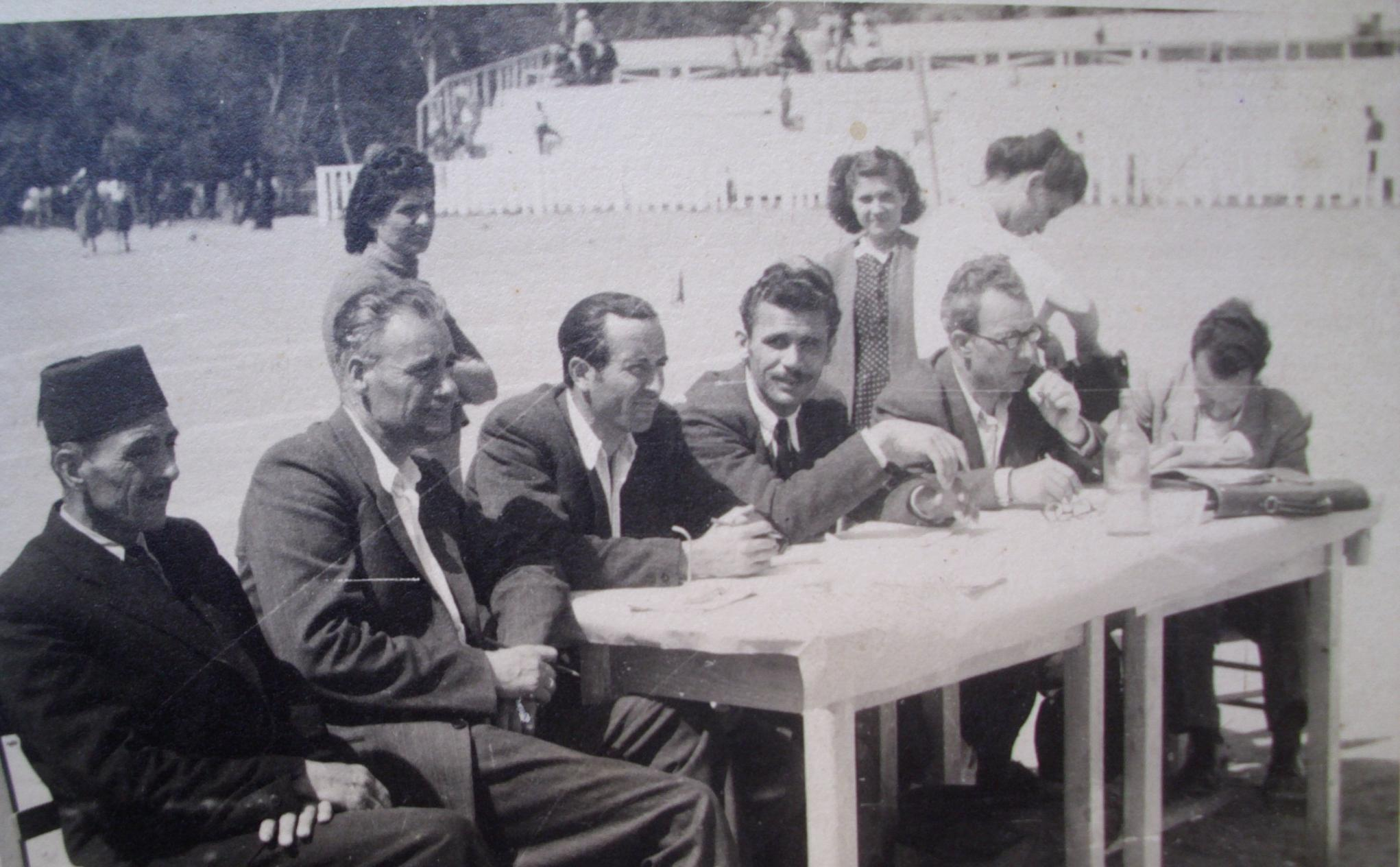
Čučkov as a part of a commission for rating folk dances, Bitola, 1949.

Between 1946 and 1950 Čučkov was a member of the People's Assembly of Macedonia. From 1946 to 1947 he was the director of the National and University Library "St. Kliment of Ohrid". As a musicologist and ethnologist, in 1947 he founded the Institute for Domestic Artistic Handicrafts "Macedonian Folklore", and from 1948 he became an associate of the newly founded Institute of National History. In 1949, he became the director of the state ensemble for folk songs and dances "Tanec".

In the 1950s, Čučkov became the vice president of the Higher Schools Committee. Then in 1954, he became a part-time assistant professor and in 1957 a full-time teacher of Economic Geography at the Faculty of Economics in Skopje. In March 1958, he defended his earlier doctoral dissertation. He is the author of several university and high school textbooks, manuals and research materials in the field of history, geography, economy, folklore, ethnography and education of the SR Macedonia.

He died in Skopje.
