= Mara Buneva =

Bulgarian revolutionary (1902–1928)

- Мара Бунева
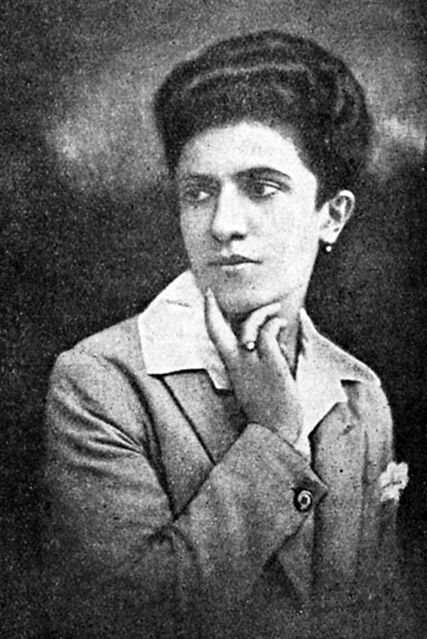
- Born: 1902; Tetovo, Ottoman Empire
- Died: January 13, 1928 (aged 25–26); Skopje, Kingdom of Serbs, Croats and Slovenes
- Organization: IMRO

Mara Buneva (Cyrillic: Мара Бунева; 1902 – January 13, 1928) was a Macedonian Bulgarian revolutionary, a member of the Internal Macedonian Revolutionary Organization, who assassinated Velimir Prelić, a former Serbian Chetnik commander and Yugoslav legal official of the Skopje Oblast. She shot herself in the chest, and subsequently died in a hospital a few hours after the attack, while Prelić died a few days later.

In general Buneva is considered a heroine in Bulgaria, while in North Macedonia she is regarded as a controversial Bulgarophile. Her death is commemorated annually at the place where she shot herself on Vardar in Skopje.

== Biography ==
Buneva was born in 1902, in Tetovo, then in the Kosovo Vilayet of the Ottoman Empire (present-day North Macedonia). Her family originates from the village of Setole. She was raised as a Bulgarian Exarchist. After being under Bulgarian occupation during World War I, Vardar Macedonia became part of a Serbian province called South Serbia in the Kingdom of Serbs, Croats and Slovenes. Her father Nikola Bunev became then the mayor of Tetovo. At that time Buneva studied at the Skopje's Girls' High School.

In 1919, Buneva moved to Bulgaria. There she studied at the Sofia University, and married a Bulgarian officer. In 1926, she divorced, and under the influence of her brother Boris, also a Bulgarian officer, Buneva joined the Internal Macedonian Revolutionary Organization (IMRO). Later on direct order by the leader of the IMRO, Ivan Mihaylov, she was trained in Sofia for fulfilling of future terrorist actions. In 1927, she went back to Yugoslavia and opened a shop in Skopje with a conspiratorial mission.

There she managed to acquaint herself with Velimir Prelić, the legal adviser of the Serbian governor of the Skopje district. Prelić was instrumental in arrests of young local students, members of Macedonian Youth Secret Revolutionary Organization (MYSRO). The organization was discovered by the authorities in May 1927 and its leaders were arrested. In a trial in Skopje against 20 of them, most were sentenced in December to long-term imprisonment. As a result, IMRO ordered the execution of Prelić. The task was given to Buneva. Mencha Karnicheva, assassin of Todor Panitsa and Mihaylov's wife, who strongly inspired her, met her before the assassination in Skopje in 1928. At the appointed time on January 13, 1928, Buneva intercepted him on his way to lunch and shot the official after which she committed suicide. On the next day, the Serbian police buried Buneva's body at an unknown place. Prelić also died in hospital a few days later and was buried in Skopje.

== Legacy ==
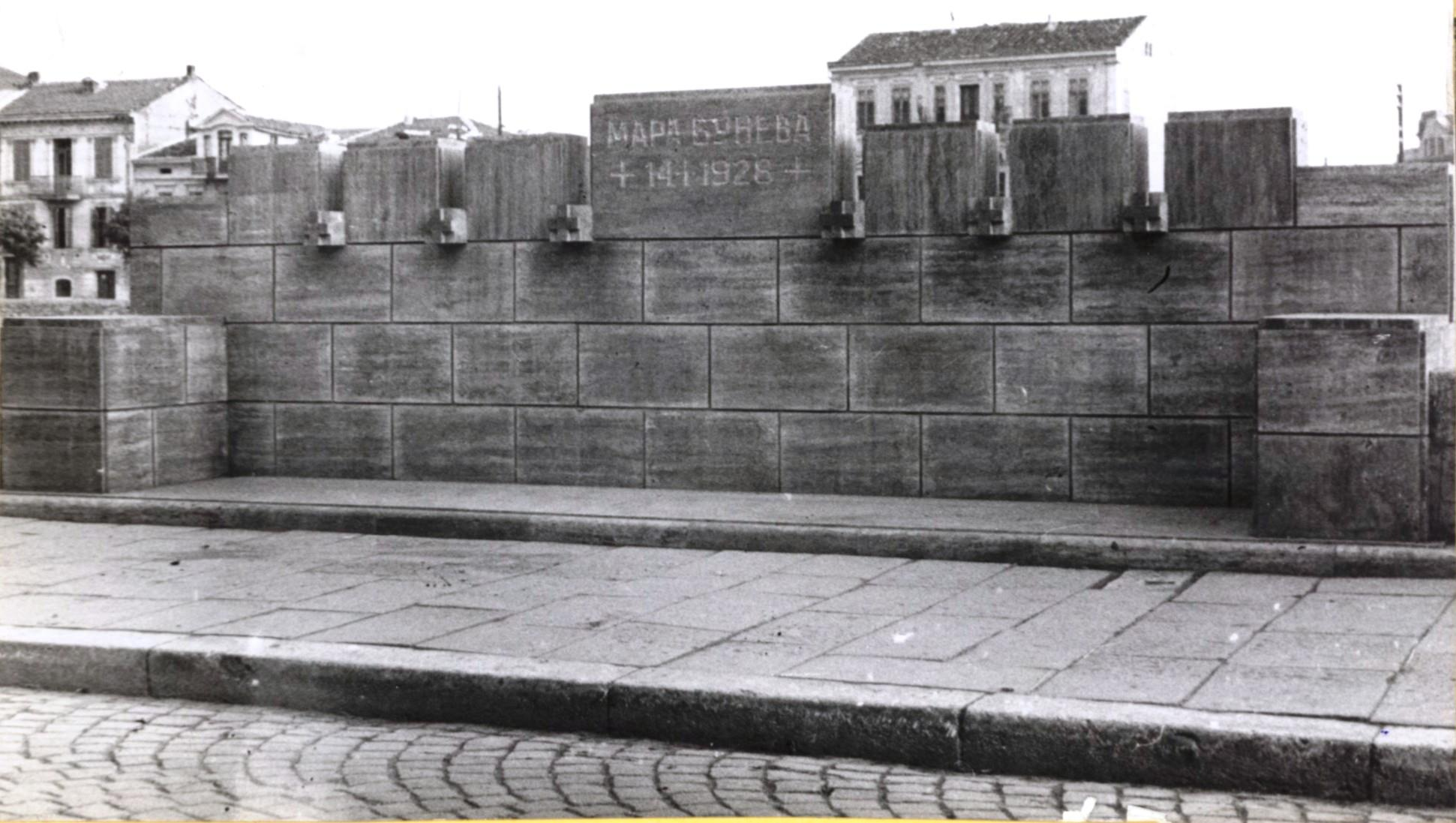
A commemorative plate was mounted at the death place of Buneva in 1943 by the Bulgarian authorities, later destroyed by the Yugoslav communist authorities.

A bTV - news screenshot, showing а broken plate commemorating Buneva on the Vardar river levee, after being destroyed by local ultra-nationalists.

After her death, the Serbian authorities attempted to remove every trace of her. IMRO celebrated her as a hero and martyr. The first Macedonian Patriotic Organization ladies auxiliary branch was created in Toronto in 1928 and named after her. Bulgaria and its diaspora celebrated her as a martyr for the freedom of Macedonia. During the Second World War, Bulgaria annexed Vardar Macedonia and at the place of her death, a commemorative plate was mounted. Two commemorative ceremonies also occurred in Skopje. Members of the Bulgarian regime, including Mihaylovists and collaborators, attended the commemorative event dedicated to her in Skopje in 1942, while Mihaylov himself sent a bouquet from Croatia. Members of MYSRO also honored her. Partisans perceived the plate in Skopje as a symbol of the occupation regime. According to historian Mile Todorovski, partisan groups vandalized the area around the plate with anti-regime and communist slogans. Her commemorative plate was destroyed by the new Yugoslav communist authorities. In the period after the Second World War, Mihaylov stated that she should be annually commemorated in Skopje by the Bulgarian youth.

In the post-communist period, VMRO-Union of Macedonian Associations' (now VMRO-BND) political platform embraced her legacy, along with Mihaylov's. The women's association of the organization was named "Mara Buneva" in the early 1990s, while in 1994 the organization published a 16-page brochure about her. Since the beginning of the 2000s, almost every year on the day of her death, Bulgarians from North Macedonia and Bulgaria, particularly VMRO-BND activists, have been illegally mounting new commemorative plates. However, the plates are quickly removed or destroyed. Members of the Radko Association were the first to initiate a commemoration of her in Skopje in 2001 in the post-communist period. On January 13, 2002, a memorial service dedicated to her at the St. Demetrious Church in Skopje was attended by politicians, members of VMRO-DPMNE, members of the Radko Association and others. A commemorative plate dedicated to her was unveiled by a member of VMRO-DPMNE after the service. The Macedonian Orthodox Church has regularly hosted religious services dedicated to her. In January 2007, the celebration ended with a fight in Skopje, resulting in around 15 people being injured and an official note being sent from the Bulgarian embassy in Skopje to the authorities. Former Macedonian Prime Minister Ljubčo Georgievski claims that to be against Buneva means not to have adequate knowledge of the history, to defend Prelić and the Greater Serbian cause. According to Bulgarian officials, the repetitive incidents in Skopje are part of an ongoing anti-Bulgarian campaign there. During the 2000s, Macedonian historian Zoran Todorovski perceived the assassination as a highly moral and heroic act.

No official in North Macedonia has honored her in front of her memorial plate. Some Macedonian associations in the 2010s have declared Buneva as an ethnic Macedonian heroine, claiming she was appropriated by the Bulgarians. In 2015, the right-wing non-governmental organization "Macedonian Patriotic Association – Todor Aleksandrov" placed a commemorative plate in Macedonian on her deathplace. She has been a controversial figure in North Macedonia, being interpreted either as a "Great Bulgarian chauvinist" or a "Macedonian heroine against the Bulgarian occupier". Such an interpretation is an example of misinterpretation of historical facts. For Bulgaria, she is a "legendary Bulgarian revolutionary", and her act left a "deep imprint on Bulgarian history". In the same year, another commemorative event was organized by the Bulgarian Cultural Club in Skopje. A wax figure of Buneva was set up in the Museum of the Macedonian Struggle, alongside Mihaylov's, opened in 2011 in Skopje, as part of the Skopje 2014 project. According to Macedonian historians, placing wax figures of controversial figures like her only causes further confusion in Macedonian national history. The Macedonian public perceived the placement of the figures as partisanship. The members of the Bulgarian Cultural Club of Skopje condemned her appropriation within the Macedonian national narrative. On January 16, 2024, a film about her called The Avenger (2023) was screened at the Bulgarian Culture and Information Centre in Skopje. Streets in Sofia and Blagoevgrad are named after her, as well as the Buneva Point in Antarctica has been named after her by the Bulgarian Antarctic Institute.
