= Association against Bulgarian Bandits =

Paramilitary organization in Yugoslavia

- Удружење против бугарских бандита Udruženje protiv bugarskih bandita
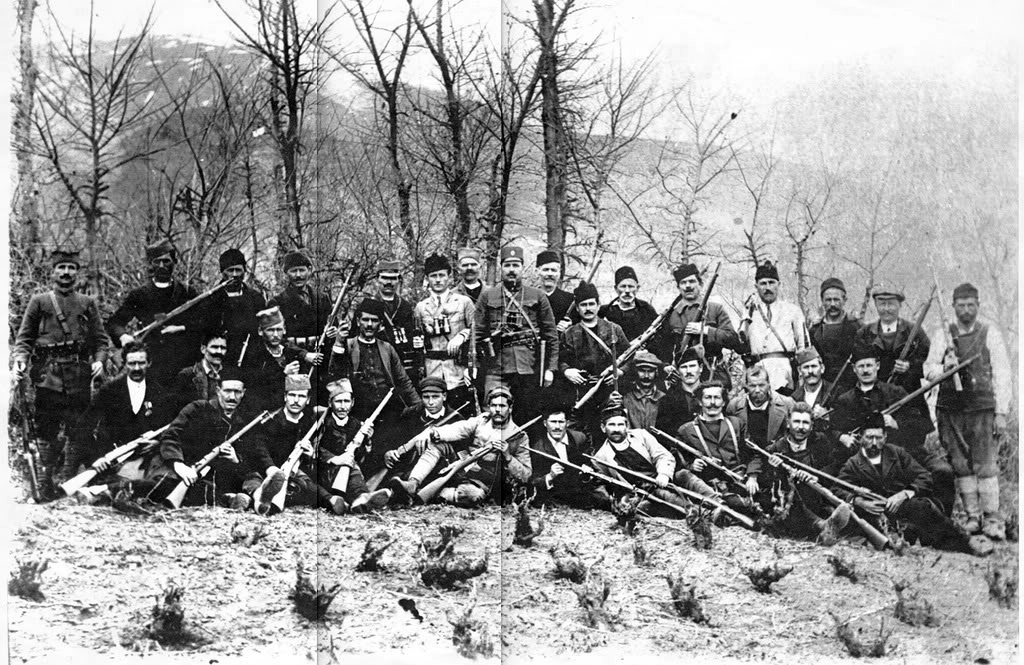
- Members of the Association against Bulgarian Bandits in Vardar Banovina before 1930
- Active: 1923–1934
- Country: Kingdom of Yugoslavia
- Type: Paramilitary
- Role: Irregular warfare Patrolling

Commanders
- Notable commanders: Kosta Pećanac

The Association against Bulgarian Bandits (Serbian: Удружење против бугарских бандита, romanized: Udruženje protiv bugarskih bandita) was a paramilitary organization based in Štip, then in the Kingdom of Serbs, Croats and Slovenes, that was active during the interwar period.

== Founding ==
Following the First World War, the new Kingdom was reliant on patronage from the Serbian monarchy that resulted in tendencies of centralisation and Serbianisation which made non-Serbs in the country view the new Kingdom as an extension of the former Kingdom of Serbia. After the Internal Macedonian Revolutionary Organization (IMRO) was re-established at the end of 1919, its bands began to target new Serbian settlers and their colonies in Vardar Macedonia to scare them away, as well as to deter other settlers. On the other hand, the Internal Western Outlands Revolutionary Organization was created as an offshoot of the IMRO in 1921 following the cession of the so-called Western Outlands. This organization focused on achieving the restoration of these territories to Bulgaria, attacking Yugoslav garrisons and infrastructure.

These security issues caused in the Yugoslav south by IMRO contributed to the creation of the organization. The Association against Bulgarian Bandits was set up on 9 September 1923 in Štip by former Chetniks, under the leadership of Kosta Pećanac and Ilija Trifunović-Lune. The organization consisted of IMRO federalist renegades, former Chetniks, retired military officers, members of the organization National Defense, and local volunteers. According to historian John Paul Newman, its intention was to protect the Serb population from IMRO and Kachak attacks. It demanded assistance from the state to defend itself against anti-Serbian forces in the southern part of the country.

After its establishment, the organization began to spread beyond the Bregalnica County. In May the following year, it was claimed that the organization had 10,000 members throughout the eastern parts of Vardar Macedonia. While members from cities had to pay a monthly membership fee, members from villages had to patrol. Each village had two on-duty patrols (six to eight members). Each district in Bregalnica County had its own branch responsible to the organization's headquarters in Štip. Members of the organization wore black uniforms. Between 1923 and 1924, during the apogee of interwar military activity, a total of 53 armed bands operated in the region of Yugoslav (Vardar) Macedonia, according to IMRO statistics. The aggregate membership of the bands was 3,245 rebels, while 119 armed clashes and 73 terrorist acts were documented. IMRO killed Serb settlers. Violent Serb counter-measures and the organization's excesses resulted in continued local support for IMRO.

== Expansion and transformation ==
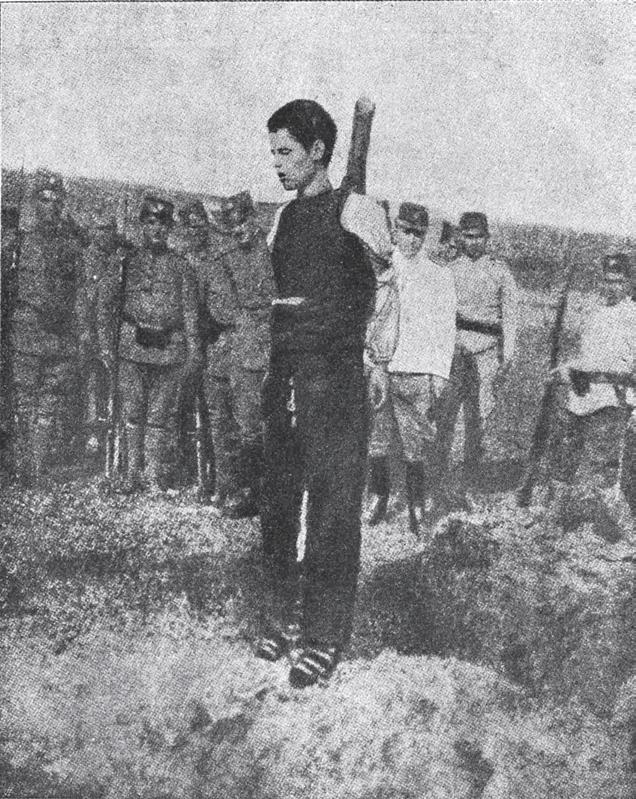
The execution of the IMRO activist Kiril Gligorov by Yugoslav authorities in 1925.

In March 1923, Bulgaria signed the Treaty of Niš with the Kingdom of Serbs, Croats and Slovenes and undertook to suppress the operations conducted from Bulgarian territory by the IMRO. Responding to this, the IMRO, aided by radical officers, carried out a coup d'état. The fall of Stamboliyski's pro-Yugoslav government was seen as a great success for IMRO. Subsequently, some of the federalists who had fled from Bulgaria placed themselves in Yugoslav service, joining the Association against Bulgarian Bandits and fighting against the IMRO. Yugoslav Prime Minister Ljubomir Davidović openly declared his opposition to this, but Žika Lazić, who coordinated the work of the guerrillas, claimed not to have found a better mechanism for the mutual annihilation of current and former Bulgarian komitadjis. As a result of these events, the IMRO, aided unofficially by the new government, came to operate as a "state within the state" in Bulgaria, using it as its hub for swift raids against Yugoslavia. In consequence, the Yugoslav-Bulgarian frontier had at the end of the 1920s been turned into the most fortified one in Europe. Several leaders of the federalist faction of IMRO defected to the organization, such as Stoyan Mishev, Gligor Tsiklev, Mita Sokolarski-Sudzhukareto, Vane Arsov, Pano Eftimov, Pano Zhiganski, Sande Pelivanov, Hristo Umlenski, and Iliya Pandurski. Their defection happened in May, during their conflict with IMRO's right-wing. Former federalists and their followers became part of the organization. Members that used to be associated with the federalist faction of the IMRO seized the opportunity to eliminate their rivals from IMRO and continue their own agenda. Federalist renegades interrupted IMRO's communications, created a federalist network, and recruited local supporters. Several regenades were killed, such as Sokolarski-Sudzhukareto, Mishev and Pandurski. The assassin of Mishev, Kiril Gligorov, was captured near the Bulgarian border by the Yugoslav authorities, tried and given the death sentence.

The organization (which was funded by the Yugoslav state) arranged the murders of Macedonian Youth Secret Revolutionary Organization's local leaders, Trayko Popov in Gevgelija, Nikola Chakarov in Dojran, and others. By its 10th anniversary, the organization was spread throughout eastern Macedonia, from Kumanovo in the north to Gevgelija in the south. However, the organization was named as Peoples' Self-Defense then. It was a volunteer militia, and its members were known as militiamen. It continued to have good relations with the Yugoslav security. In 1930, the Royal Yugoslav Army distributed around 25,000 rifles, mostly to members of organization. The organization claimed in 1933 that it had around 25,000 militiamen "ready, at any moment, to be deployed whenever they are needed to carry out designated assignment, which is exclusively to pursue, apprehend and annihilate Bulgarian bandits infiltrated on our territory." The organization transformed itself because of the intensive participation of Chetnik veterans in the organization's struggle against IMRO's attacks, as well as because local heads of communities and districts were replaced with retired military officers, and members of the National Defense. In the period from 1923 to 1933, it managed to kill 128 komitadjis, wound 13 komitadjis and capture 151 komitadjis, while 59 of its members were killed and 14 were wounded. The organization also wanted to impose and demonstrate the "Serbian character" of Macedonia, as well as to maintain the territory under the control of the People's Radical Party, leading to cases of corruption, extortions, beatings, and different types of physical violence.

After the Bulgarian coup d'état of 1934, the bases of the IMRO in Bulgaria were subjected to a military crackdown by the Bulgarian army, and the organization was reduced to a marginal phenomenon.

== See also ==
- Society against Serbs
- Bulgarian occupation of Serbia (World War I)
- Bulgarian anti-guerrilla detachments in Vardar Macedonia during WWII
