= Skopje Student Trial =

1927 trial

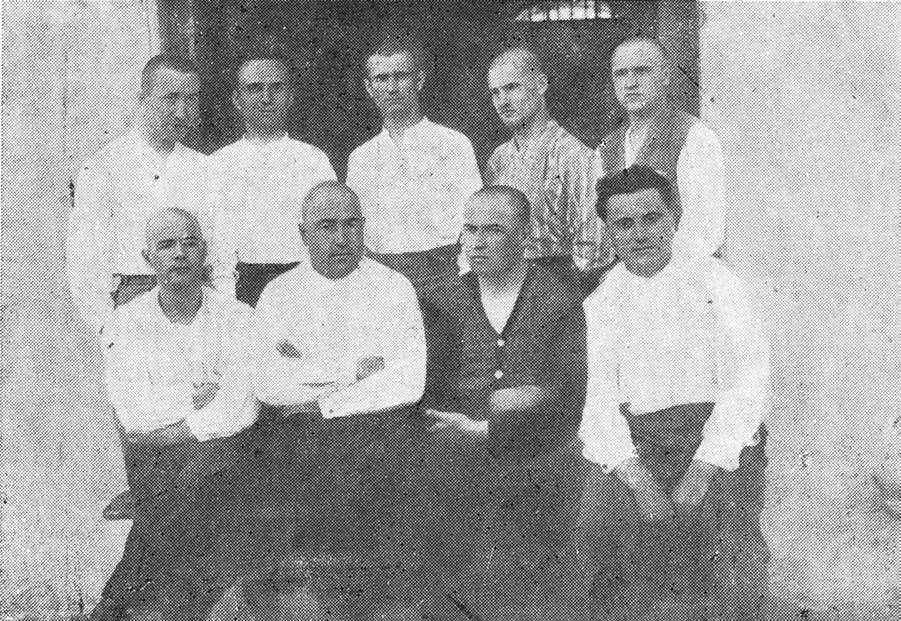
Members of the pro-Bulgarian MYSRO during the trial in 1927.

A trial began on December 5, 1927, in Skopje, then in the Kingdom of Yugoslavia, against students and activists of the Macedonian Youth Secret Revolutionary Organization. A total of 20 Macedonian Bulgarian students stood on the bench. They were accused of fighting for an Independent Macedonia. Before the trial, the students were subjected to torture.The trial ended on December 10. Several defendants were imprisoned, while others were acquitted. As a result of the verdicts after the trial, Mara Buneva killed the Serb Velimir Prelić, the chief public prosecutor in the case.

== Background ==
A series of incidents occurred in Vardar Macedonia, leading to increased Yugoslav security measures. The Kingdom of Yugoslavia then pursued a policy of Serbianisation towards the Slavic population of the area, called "Southern Serbia". Dimitar Gyuzelov, a student and member of the Macedonian Youth Secret Revolutionary Organization (MYSRO), was arrested on May 29, 1927. Jovan Gavrilović, a postal office employee from Gevgelija, reported him to the authorities after Gyuzelov attempted to recruit him to the MYSRO. Several other MYSRO members from Skopje were arrested. As a result, many arrests occurred throughout Yugoslav universities, affecting around 70 people. The youth organization of the Internal Macedonian Revolutionary Organization (IMRO) was discovered. However, most of the suspects were released, while 20 students remained in custody. The 20 students were tortured. The trial was scheduled for December. The students were indicted based on signed confessions, evidence discovered in Gyuzelov's home (such as the organization's statute, literature and press), written instructions for gathering intelligence, and Gavrilović's testimony.

== Trial ==
The trial against the students began on December 5, 1927. The Belgrade newspaper Politika reported extensively on the trial. The defendants were accused of preparing a revolution as part of MYSRO. The main prosecution witness, Gavrilović, accused the defendants of fighting for an Independent Macedonia. The prosecution argued that the MYSRO was part of the IMRO, thus making the defendants eligible for trial under the Law on the Protection of Public Order and the State. The defense pointed out that there were breaches of legal procedure during the interrogations, such as torture. Ante Pavelić, a lawyer, member of the National Assembly and future leader of the Independent State of Croatia, participated in the trial as part of the defense. Under cross-examination, the defendants denied any involvement in anti-state and underground activities.

During the trial, graffiti were written on the streets of Skopje, reading "Serbs, go back to Sumadia" and "Macedonia is Bulgarian!". The "Secret cultural and educational organization of the Macedonian Bulgarian women" took an active part in the process, organizing the supply of the prisoners with basic necessities. The sentencing occurred on December 10. Dimitar Gyuzelov and Ivan Shopov were sentenced to 20 years in prison, Dimitar Natsev to 15 years, Dimitar Chkatrov to 10 years, Haralampi Fukarov, Todor Gichev, Sheryo Bozdov, Boris Svetiev, and Boris Andreev were given five years each. The other eleven were acquitted of all charges.

== Aftermath ==
An appeal court and the Supreme Court confirmed the verdict of the Skopje court. The British embassy reported that the students were physically abused while in prison. IMRO sentenced Velimir Prelić to death. On January 13, 1928, in the centre of Skopje, the sentence was carried out by revolutionary Mara Buneva, who shot and killed Prelić. In retaliation for the persecution, IMRO leader Ivan Mihaylov ordered the assassination of Yugoslav official Živojin Lazić in July 1928, but it failed. Lazić became the head (ban) of Vardar Banovina in the next year. Traditionally, the Yugoslav government gave amnesties during important events such as public holidays, the king's birthday, royal marriage or the birth of an heir to the throne. On December 1, 1931, the anniversary of the creation of Yugoslavia on December 1, 1918, Yugoslav king Alexander amnestied Gyuzelov, Shopov, Natsev, Gichev, Bozdov, Svetiev, and Andreev, while Chkatrov and Fukarov were excluded and remained in prison.
