= Chetniks (disambiguation) =

The term Chetniks most commonly refers to a World War II Yugoslav political movement and guerilla force led by Draža Mihailović. For that topic, see Chetniks.

Chetniks may also refer to:

- Serbian Chetnik Organization, active during the Macedonian Struggle (1903–1907)
- Chetniks in the Balkan Wars, paramilitary detachments during the First and Second Balkan Wars (1912–1913)
- Chetniks in World War I, auxiliary units of the Royal Serbian Army (1914–1918)
- Chetniks in the interwar period, veteran associations of former Chetnik fighters (1918–1941)
- Chetnik (pejorative), an ethnic slur used against Serbs, especially during the Yugoslav Wars (1990s)
- Members of a Cheta (armed group), Balkan irregular bands in the late Ottoman Empire

== See also ==
- Cheta (disambiguation)
