= Bitola Oblast =

Former oblast of Yugoslavia

Bitola Oblast Битолска област
- Oblast of the Kingdom of Serbs, Croats and Slovenes
- 1922–1929
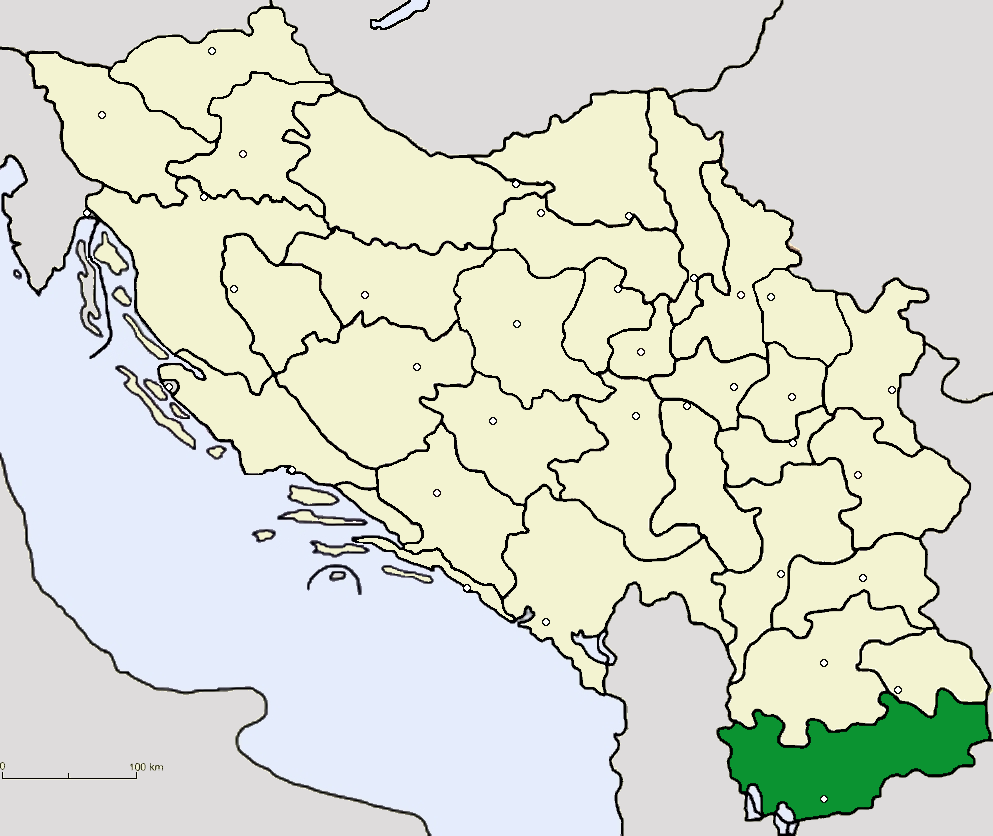
- The oblasts of Yugoslavia (1922-1929)
- Capital: Bitola
- Area
  - Coordinates: 41°01′N 21°20′E
- History
  - Established: 1922
  - Disestablished: 1929
Preceded by	Succeeded by
District of Bitola	Vardar Banovina
- Today part of: North Macedonia

Bitola Oblast (Macedonian: Битолска област, romanized: Bitolska Oblast) was one of the oblasts of the Kingdom of Serbs, Croats and Slovenes from 1922 to 1929. Its capital was Bitola, which the oblast was named after.

== History ==
The Kingdom of Serbs, Croats and Slovenes was formed in 1918 and was initially divided into counties and districts (this division was inherited from previous state administrations). In 1922, the country was divided into 33 new administrative units known as oblasts (Serbo-Croatian: области, romanized: oblasti). Before 1922, the territory of the Bitola Oblast was part of the Bitola District.

In 1929, the 33 oblasts were administratively replaced with 9 banovinas and one district, and the territory of the Bitola Oblast was incorporated into the new Vardar Banovina.

== Geography ==
The Bitola Oblast included most of what is now the Southwestern, Pelagonia, Vardar, and Southeastern Statistical Regions. It shared borders with the Skopje and Bregalnica Oblasts to the north, Albania to the east, Greece to the south, and Bulgaria to the west.

== Demographics ==
According to the 1921 census, the Bitola Oblast was linguistically dominated by speakers of Bulgarian.

== Cities and Towns ==
The main cities and towns located within the oblast were:

- Bitola
- Kavadarci
- Ohrid
- Struga
- Gevgelija

All the mentioned cities and towns are now part of North Macedonia.

== See also ==
- Bitola
- North Macedonia
- Kingdom of Serbs, Croats and Slovenes
