= Cheta =

Cheta may refer to:

- Cheta (armed group), a type of armed band of the Ottoman Balkans
- Chaeta, part of some invertebrates' anatomy
- Cheta (woreda), an administrative division of Ethiopia
- Cheta, SBS Nagar, a village in India
- Cheta language, a language of Brazil
- Cheta Emba (born 1993), American rugby player
- Cheta Ozougwu (born 1988), American football player
- "Cheta", a 2016 song by Ada Ehi

== See also ==
- Ceta (disambiguation)
- Cheeta
- Chita (disambiguation)
- Chetan (disambiguation)
- Kheta (disambiguation)
- Chetniks (disambiguation)
