= Settai =

Settai may refer to:

- Settai (film), a 2013 Indian Tamil-language comedy film by R. Kannan
- Settai (Lydia), a town of ancient Lydia
- Settai Station, a railway station in Miyako, Iwate Prefecture, Japan

== See also ==
- Seta (disambiguation)
