= Velimir Prelić =

Serbian Chetnik and jurist (1883-1928)

Velimir Prelić Велимир Прелић
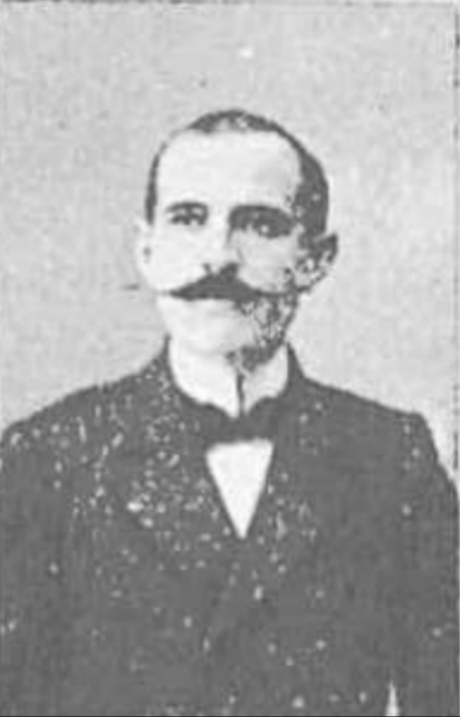
- Velimir Prelić
- Born: 1883; Sjenica, Ottoman Empire (today Serbia)
- Died: 13 January 1928 (aged 44–45); Skoplje, Kingdom of Serbs, Croats and Slovenes (today North Macedonia)

Velimir Prelić (Serbian: Велимир Прелић; 1883 – 13 January 1928) was a jurist and Serbian Chetnik during the Macedonian Struggle (1903-1912). He was a member of the Central Committee of the Serb Democratic League in 1908. After World War I, he became a Yugoslav legal advisor of the Skoplje County. He was shot in Skopje in 1928 by a Macedono-Bulgarian assassin Mara Buneva on 13 January 1928 in Skopje as punishment for his role in the Skopje student trial against activists of the Macedonian Youth Secret Revolutionary Organization.

== Biography ==
After his primary education, the family moved to Belgrade where young Prelić finished high school and Law Faculty. He joined the Serbian Chetnik Organization and was sent to Old Serbia during the Macedonian struggle (1903-1912) to fight as a Chetnik commander.

After the Young Turk revolution in 1908 when affairs in Macedonia seemed to be going towards a political solution, Prelić took part in the First Conference of Serbs of Old Serbia and Macedonia (12-15 August 1908) in Skopje. In 1908, he was elected as a member of the Central Committee of the newly- founded Serb Democratic League, a political party of Serbs living in the Ottoman Empire. Prelić also took part as a member of the Assembly of Serbs in Ottoman Empire in Skoplje, which first met in February 1909 and was active until the end of that year when it was banned by the Young Turks. He was one of ten members in the Central Committee which also included president Bogdan Radenković, Vasa Jovanović, Gligorije Elezović, Milan Čemerikić, Sava Stojanović, Aleksandar Bukvić, David Dimitrijević, Đorđe Hadži-Kostić, and Jovan Šantrić.

After World War I, Prelic, who was a colonel from the Serbo-Croato-Slovene police, became a legal advisor of the Skoplje County. He had been known for ordering arrests of young local students, who openly opposed the Yugoslav rule. On his orders in 1927 in Skopje, an investigation was organized against members of the illegal Macedonian Youth Secret Revolutionary Organization. The organization was discovered by the authorities in May and its leaders were arrested. The defendants were subjected to severe tortures. On a trial in Skopje against twenty of them, most were sentenced in December to long-term imprisonment. As result the leader of the pro-Bulgarian IMRO in Sofia — Ivan Mihajlov, ordered the execution of Prelić.

== Murder ==
On 13 January 1928, Velimir Prelić was shot by Mara Buneva, a prominent Internal Macedonian Revolutionary Organization member. The assassination was carried out on "Radomir Putnik" street in downtown Skopje, where he was shot in the back. Prelić died three days later at the Military Hospital in Skopje. During the Bulgarian occupation of the Kingdom of Yugoslavia from 1941 to 1945, at the site of the assassination, there was a memorial plaque honoring Mara Buneva, which was removed by the Macedonian government after the war. Since 2000, the memorial plaque has been erected and removed on several occasions.
