= Ceta =

Ceta may refer to:

- Četa, an armed band of the Balkans
- Anton Çeta (1920–1995), Albanian academic
- Ceta Ramkhalawansingh, Canadian politician

CETA may refer to:

- Comprehensive Economic and Trade Agreement
- Comprehensive Employment and Training Act
- CETA Artists Project (NYC)

== See also ==
- Cheta (disambiguation)
- Seta (disambiguation)
