= Svračkovci =

- Village
- Location within Serbia
- Coordinates: 44°04′N 20°32′E
- Country: Serbia
- District: Moravica District
- Municipality: Gornji Milanovac
- Elevation: 517 m (1,696 ft)

Population (2011)
  - Total: 462
- Time zone: UTC+1 (CET)
  - Summer (DST): UTC+2 (CEST)

Svračkovci is a village in the municipality of Gornji Milanovac, Serbia. According to the 2011 census, the village has a population of 462 inhabitants.

The village was active in the Serbian Revolution, being organized into the knežina (administrative unit) of Brusnica (Takovo) during the First Serbian Uprising (1804–13). The buljubaša and knez Jovan Lazić (1763–1831) came from the village.
