= Chetniks in the interwar period =

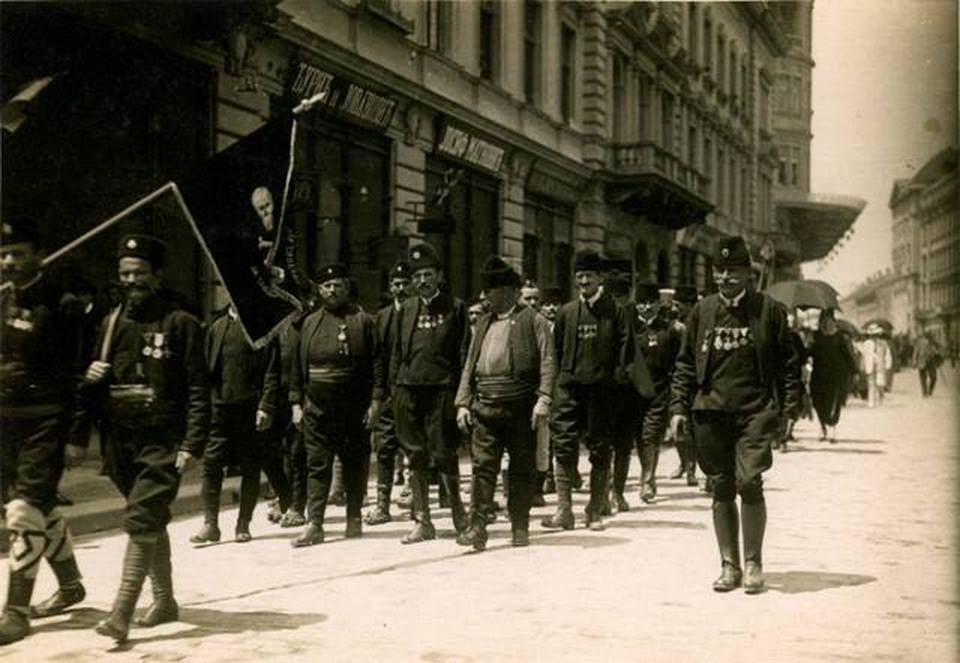
Chetniks on parade in Belgrade, c. 1920.

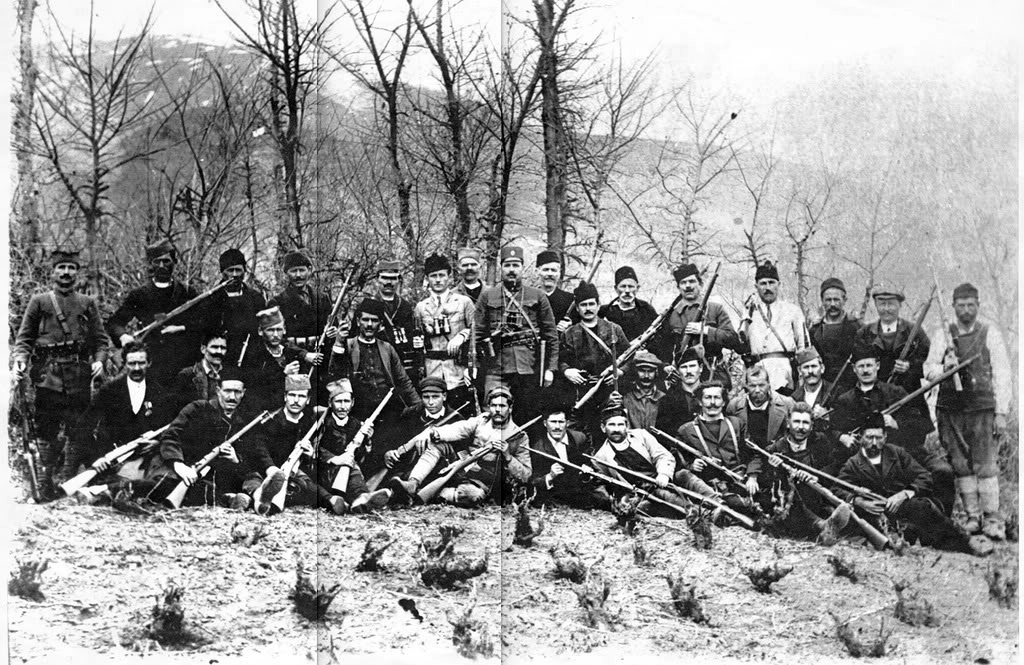
Association against Bulgarian Bandits, between 1922 and 1925.

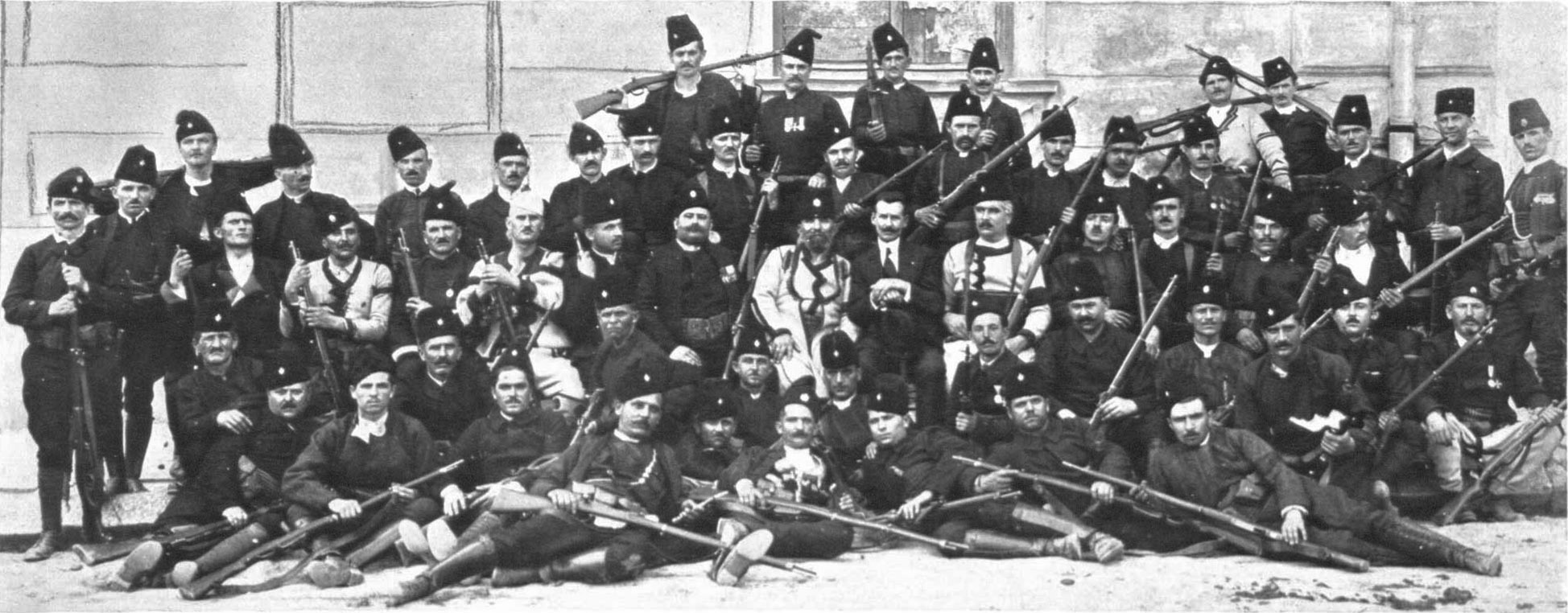
Chetnik Association, between 1921 and 1926.

In the interwar period in Yugoslavia (1918–41), there were several veteran associations of Serbian guerrillas (known as "Chetniks") that had fought in Ottoman Macedonia (1903–12), Balkan Wars (1912–13) and World War I (1914–18).

Leading Chetniks were split between the Democratic Party (DS) and Radical Party (RS), and also between ties to the secret societies of the Black Hand and White Hand. These ideological differences led to the formation of several Chetnik associations (četnička udruženja). The first association, established in 1921, was split corresponding to the Yugoslavist DS and Serbian nationalist RS in 1924.

The most important figures in the Chetnik movement in this period were Puniša Račić, Ilija Trifunović-Birčanin and Kosta Milovanović-Pećanac. Following the proclamation of the 6 January Dictatorship by king Alexander I in 1929 and the establishment of the “integral Yugoslavism”, the various Chetnik associations re-organised themself into a single officially sanctioned group, the “Association of Chetniks”. However, even under the homogenizing pressures of dictatorship, the Chetniks were not a monolithic movement.

== Background ==
The Serbian Chetnik Organization, founded by Serbian activists, organized guerrilla units dispatched into Ottoman territories to the south of the Kingdom of Serbia. In the 1904–12 period these guerrilla units conducted warfare in Macedonia, seeking to liberate the region and join it with Serbia. At first privately organized, its directions were soon taken over by the Serbian government. The guerrilla action accompanied the dissemination of nationalist propaganda (nationalization). The Chetniks, as an auxiliary force, played an active role in the Balkan Wars and World War I.

== Associations ==
Association	Active	Notes
Association of Chetniks for Freedom and Honour of the Fatherland (Udruženje četnika za slobodu i čast otadžbine)	1921–44	
Association of Serbian Chetniks for King and Fatherland (Udruženje srpskih četnika za kralja i otadžbinu)	1924–25	Split from Chetnik Association.
Association of Serbian Chetniks "Petar Mrkonjić" (Udruženje srpskih četnika Petar Mrkonjić)	1924–25	Split from Chetnik Association.
Association of Serbian Chetniks "Petar Mrkonjić" for King and Fatherland (Udruženje srpskih četnika Petar Mrkonjić za kralja i otadžbinu)	1925–29	Merged from the 1924 organizations.
Association of Old Chetniks (Udruženje starih četnika)	1934–	Split from Chetnik Association.
Association against Bulgarian Bandits (Udruženje protiv bugarskih bandita)	1922–30	anti-Bulgarian counter-terrorist paramilitary

== Sources ==
- Newman, John Paul (2015). Yugoslavia in the Shadow of War: Veterans and the Limits of State Building, 1903–1945. Cambridge University Press. ISBN 978-1-107-07076-9.
- Nielsen, Christian Axboe (2014). Making Yugoslavs: Identity in King Aleksandar's Yugoslavia. University of Toronto Press. pp. 131, 241, 243, 244, 274, 349, 351. ISBN 978-1-4426-2750-5.
- Tomasevich, Jozo (1975). The Chetniks. Stanford University Press. pp. 41–42, 116–21, 125, 156. ISBN 978-0-8047-0857-9.
- Newman, John Paul (2017). "War Veterans, Fascism, and Para-Fascist Departures in the Kingdom of Yugoslavia, 1918–1941". Fascism. 6: 42–74. doi:10.1163/22116257-00601003.
