= South Serbia (1919–1922) =

South Serbia Јужна Србија Južna Srbija
- Pokrajina of the Kingdom of Serbs, Croats and Slovenes
- 1919–1922
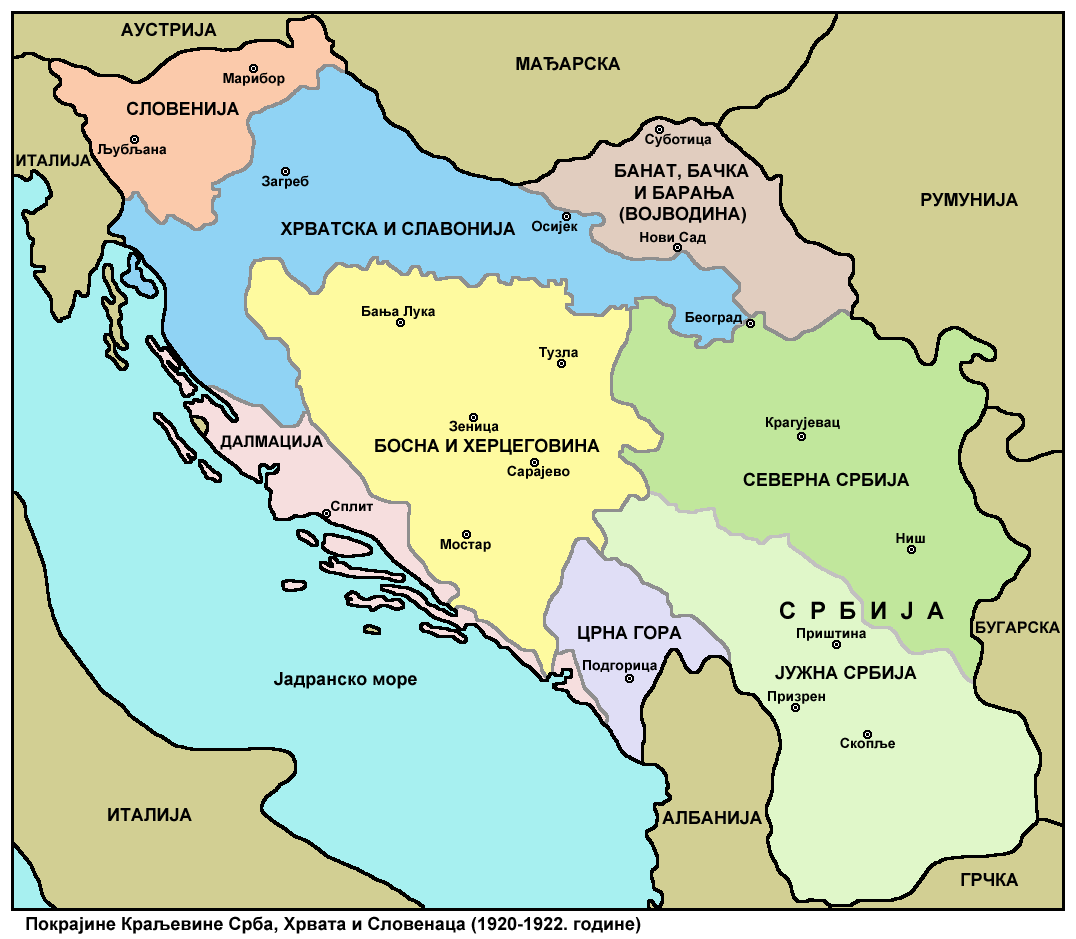
- South Serbia within Kingdom of Serbs, Croats and Slovenes (in light green)
- Capital: Skoplje, Prizren
- Population
  - 1921: 1,700,000
- History
  - Established: 1919
  - Reorganization: 1922
Preceded by	Succeeded by
Kingdom of Serbia; Kingdom of Montenegro	Vardar Banovina; Zeta Banovina

South Serbia (Serbian: Јужна Србија / Južna Srbija) was a province (pokrajina) of the Kingdom of Serbs, Croats and Slovenes from 1919 and 1922. It included the modern territories of Sandžak (parts of Serbia and Montenegro), Kosovo and North Macedonia. The term "Old Serbia", was historically used in Serbian politics, literature and science for the territories of the province. The term continued in use for the Vardar Banovina and Zeta Banovina following its disestablishment.

== History ==
The province was established in 1919, following the creation of Yugoslavia on 1 December 1918. Serbia had greatly expanded its borders during the Balkan Wars. The province was disestablished in 1922 and its territories were reorganized into the Vardar Banovina and Zeta Banovina. The term was then colloquially used for those territories.

== Economy ==
The province of South Serbia, as a mostly highland region, had favorable conditions for development of cattle breeding as illustrated by statistics on the increase of livestock numbers. The livestock numbers exceeded 13% of the total number of all of Yugoslavia. The restoration of cattle breeding, which had been destroyed during the war years, was the primary goal of the Ministry of Economy.

== Demographics ==
In 1921, the province had c. 1.7 million inhabitants. Following the First World War in Vardar Macedonia and the so-called Western Outlands, the local Bulgarian population was not recognized as a separate community and became a subject of state-policy of Serbianisation.

== Sources ==
- Institut za noviju istoriju Srbije (2007). Srbi i Jugoslavija: država, društvo, politika : zbornik radova. In-t za noviju istoriju Srbije. ISBN 9788670050556.
- Mil R. Gavrilović (1933). Privreda Južne Srbije. "Nemanja" zadužbinska štamparija Vardarske banovine.
- Милослав Стојадиновић (1929). Naše selo. b. i.
