= Seta (surname) =

Seta is a surname of several origins. It may be a Japanese surname (瀬田). It may also be an Italian occupational surname derived from the word seta, silk, and referring to a silk weaver or seller. Notable people with the surname include:

== Japanese ==
- Atsuko Seta (born 1955), Japanese woman classical pianist
- Noriyasu Seta, a character in Love Hina media
- Sōjirō Seta, a character in Rurouni Kenshin media
- Tatsuhiko Seta (born 1952), former Japanese football player
- Kaoru Seta, a character from the BanG Dream! franchise

== Other ==
- Guilherme Seta (born 2002), Brazilian actor
- Valerio Seta (1562–1625), Roman Catholic prelate
- Vittorio De Seta (1923–2011), Italian cinema director and screenwriter

== See also ==
- Setta
