= Treaty of Niš (1923) =

- Signed: 23 March 1923
- Location: Niš, Kingdom of Serbs, Croats and Slovenes
- Negotiators: (Kingdom of Yugoslavia) Živojin Lazić (Bulgaria) Aleksandar Stamboliyski
- Signatories: (Kingdom of Yugoslavia) Kingdom of Serbs, Croats and Slovenes; Kingdom of Bulgaria

The Treaty of Niš (Bulgarian: Нишка спогодба, Serbian: Нишки споразум/Niški sporazum) was a treaty signed on 23 March 1923 by the Kingdom of Serbs, Croats and Slovenes and the Kingdom of Bulgaria which obliged the Kingdom of Bulgaria to suppress the operations of the Internal Macedonian Revolutionary Organization (IMRO) carried out from Bulgarian territory. As a result of the Treaty of Neuilly-sur-Seine Bulgaria was in a grave situation having lost territory to the Kingdom of Serbs, Croats and Slovenes, Greece and Romania and the right to maintain an army of no more than 20,000 combined with heavy reparations to those countries. The treaty was an attempt to normalize relations with the Kingdom of Serbs, Croats and Slovenes and gain its support on the Bulgarian claims to Western Thrace and Southern Dobruja but knowing the Bulgarian weakness the latter reduced the negotiations to technical issues and the Bulgarian responsibilities to fight the IMRO.

== Treaty ==
The treaty was signed after its text was first discussed and agreed at the Conference of Niš held in period 1—17 March 1923. There was a leak of information through which the IMRO was informed about the preparation of the treaty during the conference in Niš. The treaty was signed by Aleksandar Stamboliyski on behalf of Kingdom of Bulgaria. By this treaty Bulgaria undertook the obligation to suppress the operations of the IMRO carried out from Bulgarian territory.

The treaty became known to the public on 7 May 1923 after the ordinance of the Council of Ministers of Bulgaria.

== Aftermath ==
Based on the information that "leaked" during the Niš Conference, the IMRO undertook immediate measures, based on a secret circular letter № 384, to create a second subsidiary organization in the border revolutionary districts in Macedonia. The Central Committee planned to move the second subsidiary organization and members away from Bulgaria and by that to preserve the organization and members in case the Bulgarian government undertook repressive measures. Three days after the conference in Niš was over, Todor Aleksandrov took new precautions and prepared constitutive documents to a new secret structure called Railway Secret Organization (RSO) as a new subsidiary organization of IMRO.

The IMRO had a prominent role in assassinating Aleksandar Stamboliyski due to his signing of the Treaty of Niš. The assassins also cut off his right hand, representing their opposition to his signing of the Treaty of Niš.

== See also ==
- Internal Macedonian Revolutionary Organization
- Aleksandar Stamboliyski
