= Treaty of Nettuno =

1925 treaty between Italy and Yugoslavia

The Treaty of Nettuno was an agreement made between the governments of Kingdom of Italy and the Kingdom of Serbs, Croats and Slovenes on 20 July 1925, which permitted Italians to freely immigrate into The Kingdom of Serbs, Croats, and Slovenes's coastal region of Dalmatia. Its ratification in The Kingdom of Serbs, Croats, and Slovenes's parliament took three years, as opposition Croatian Peasant Party representatives were infuriated with the treaty, calling it colonization by Benito Mussolini.

Following the assassination of Stjepan Radić, a new ruling coalition under Anton Korošec managed to ratify the treaty by a single vote on 13 August 1928, a move that came too late to placate the Italians yet further outraged the Croats.

== See also ==
- Rijeka
- Sušak, Rijeka
- Treaty of Rome (1924)

== Sources ==
- Rothschild, Joseph (1974). East Central Europe Between the Two World Wars. University of Washington Press. p. 227. ISBN 9780295953571.
