= Setta =

- Brandon Setta, American musician from band Nothing
- Morena Silva de Vaz Setta Baccarin, or Morena Baccarin, American actress
- Nick Setta, former professional Canadian football placekicker and punter
- Salli Setta, American restaurateur and businesswoman
- Vera Setta, Brazilian actress and theatrical producer

== See also ==
- Seta (surname)
