= Macedonian Youth Secret Revolutionary Organization =

Newspaper "Osvobojdenie" (Liberation) issued from MMTRO in Vienna, with an article about Mara Buneva on its first page.

The Macedonian Youth Secret Revolutionary Organization (Bulgarian: Македонска младежка тайна революционна организация, Macedonian: Македонска младинска тајна револуционерна организација, romanized: Makedonska mladinska tajna revolucionerna organizacija; MMTRO/MYSRO) was a secret pro-Bulgarian youth organization established by the Internal Macedonian Revolutionary Organization (IMRO), active in Macedonia between 1922 and the 1940s. MMTRO's statute and establishment were approved by the leader of the IMRO, Todor Alexandrov. After its establishment, it soon gained influence amongst Macedonian Bulgarians in Belgrade, Vienna, Graz, Prague, Ljubljana and other places where Macedonian students lived.

== History ==
=== Foundation ===
While they were studying in Vienna, Georgi Bazhdarov and Nikola Velev from Macedonia, suggested the formation of a national revolutionary youth organization. Todor Alexandrov, leader of the Internal Macedonian Revolutionary Organization (IMRO), approved MMTRO's creation and statute. It was established in Zagreb in 1922 by five students from Macedonia. Based on IMRO's traditions, new members gave an oath in front of a revolver and knife (meaning that a person who committed treason would be punished with death by either weapon). Membership in the organization was permitted for students in senior high school classes and universities. Members of the organization had to be Macedonian by origin. Per MMTRO, its ultimate goal was to prepare new "generations of fighters for the liberty of Macedonia". According to historian Antoni Giza, the organization strove for the unification of Macedonia with Bulgaria. Structures of the organization were also created in Skopje, Veles, Bitola, Ohrid, Belgrade, Ljubljana and Subotica. MMTRO's leadership in Zagreb was in constant contact with both the local structures of the organization and IMRO's Central Committee. In 1925, the organization had around 200 members, reaching as far as Tetovo and Gostivar. Two channels functioned for spreading information abroad: Skopje-Zagreb-Vienna and Skopje-Ljubljana-Trieste. Per member of the organization and historian Kosta Tsarnushanov, Aromanians and Albanians, apart from Bulgarians, were also members of the organization. Female students were also involved in the establishment of its first pentads, but a new organization named Secret Cultural-Educational Organization of Female Macedonian Bulgarians was created in 1926, whose membership was reserved exclusively for young women, based on an initiative of MMTRO activists and a group of Macedonian female students.

=== Activities and challenges ===
Members of the MMTRO participated in mandatory regular meetings every two weeks. MMTRO also organized celebrations of name days and national holidays (such as commemorating Cyril and Methodius), winter parties, and meetings with veterans and participants of the Macedonian revolutionary movement. Although the MMTRO was a secret organization, it regularly organized field trips. Its main goals were expansion and maintaining a Bulgarian national consciousness. Apart from promoting IMRO's ideas, MMTRO's pentads were also involved in maintaining clandestine channels for sending messages, spreading literature, IMRO newspapers and pamphlets. Members of the MMTRO from abroad brought illegal material after returning to Macedonia. Per MMTRO's members, one of the biggest challenges was obtaining pro-Bulgarian national and patriotic literature. In the Yugoslav educational system, such literature was banned from public and school libraries after 1918. Its public use and display was sanctioned as promotion of Bulgarian propaganda. Frankists assisted MMTRO in smuggling revolutionary literature and press outside of Yugoslavia, either by carrying it or keeping it hidden from authorities. Frankists also helped MMTRO and IMRO members whose identity was known by the authorities to leave the country and flee either to Austria or Hungary through clandestine channels.

During public events such as picnics and field trips, MMTRO members got in touch with other young people from Macedonia, mostly young workers. Non-members were also involved in both public and secret MMTRO activities. These people also hid the organization's members or helped them leave the country while they were targeted by authorities. In 1926, a meeting was organized in Trieste between MMTRO and IMRO's Central Committee. Its main goal was to resolve several issues and differences. IMRO's representatives opposed MMTRO's proposal about the establishment of its own autonomous governing body, similar to IMRO's Central Committee, arguing that it would cause a disunity. Although the meeting failed to resolve most issues, new shipments of literature were given and clandestine channels were established. A new meeting took place later in Bulgaria, which also included the leader of IMRO - Ivan Mihaylov. According to MMTRO's members, Mihaylov understood them better, as he was in his thirties and thus closer to the ages of their representatives. The meeting resulted in changes to MMTRO's structure and statute, such as the division of Macedonia into revolutionary districts, whose leaders directly answered to IMRO's Central Committee. A pentad was created to maintain contact with IMRO's Central Committee, as well as to continue smuggling revolutionary literature and press into Macedonia. The pentad also had to gather information about Macedonia, including new Yugoslav measures, the economic situation, on former members of the IMRO who switched to the Yugoslav side, and countering agitation (such as by the federalist faction of the IMRO).

=== Skopje trial and disbandment ===
On 29 May 1927, a student and member of MMTRO, Dimitar Gyuzelov, was arrested in Skopje, as a result of heightened Yugoslav security measures after a series of incidents and a Serbian postal office employee reporting him for attempted recruitment into MMTRO. Several other MMTRO members from Skopje were arrested too. In the subsequent trial in Skopje, several students were given prison sentences, while eleven others were acquitted. On 1 December 1931, Yugoslav king Alexander pardoned seven of the nine sentenced students. During the Bulgarian occupation of Skopje in World War II, MMTRO's members placed a plaque dedicated to Mara Buneva, the revolutionary who killed Yugoslav legal official Velimir Prelić on 13 January 1928. In the post-World World War II era, the organization was disbanded after many of its former members were persecuted by the Yugoslav communist regime during the 1940s. Former members of MMTRO went on to live in Bulgaria. As a result, various studies and memoirs were published about MMTRO.

== See also ==
- Secret society
