= Vardar Banovina =

Province in Yugoslavia (1929–1941)

Coordinates: 42°00′N 21°25′E

Vardar Banovina Вардарска бановина Vardarska banovina
- Banovina of Yugoslavia
- 1929–1941
- Flag Coat of arms

- Vardar Banovina (red) within the Kingdom of Yugoslavia (light yellow)
- Capital: Skopje
- Area
  - 1931: 36,672 km^{2} (14,159 sq mi)
- Population
  - 1921: 1,323,546
  - 1931: 1,574,243
- Government
  - Type: Devolved autonomous banate
- Monarch
  - 1929–1934: Alexander I
  - 1934–1941: Peter II
- Ban
  - 1929–1932: Živojin Lazić
  - 1940–1941: Žika Rafajlović
- History
  - Established: 3 October 1929
  - 1931 Yugoslav Constitution: 3 September 1931
  - Invasion of Yugoslavia: 6–18 April 1941
Succeeded by
Kingdom of Albania
Kingdom of Bulgaria
German-occupied Serbia
- Today part of: Kosovo; North Macedonia; Serbia

The Vardar Banovina, or Vardar Banate (Bulgarian, Macedonian and Serbo-Croatian: Вардарска бановина, romanized: Vardarska Banovina; Albanian: Banovina e Vardarit), was a province (banate) of the Kingdom of Yugoslavia between 1929 and 1941.

== History ==
It was located in the southernmost part of the country, encompassing the whole of today's North Macedonia, southern parts of Southern and Eastern Serbia and southeastern parts of Kosovo and Serbia. It was named after the Vardar River and its administrative capital was the city of Skopje. According to the 1930 statistics of the Central Press Bureau of the Ministerial Council out of the 9 Yugoslav banovinas, the "Vardarska" banovina was the largest at 38,879 km^{2} (15,011 sq mi); while its population, was the fourth at 1,386,370 inhabitants. Following the First World War, in Vardar Macedonia and in the Western Outlands, the local Bulgarian (Macedonian Bulgarian) population was not recognized and a state-policy of forced Serbianisation occurred. It also suffered the worst health problems, especially typhus and smallpox, and required one Institute of Hygiene, 3 health stations and 6 dispensaries and convalescent homes. On the other hand, unlike the banovinas that until the creation of Yugoslavia had belonged to the Austro-Hungarian empire and the lands of Montenegro, it had inherited no debts. According to the 1931 Constitution of the Kingdom of Yugoslavia, the Vardar Banovina was bounded on the north by the boundaries of the Zeta and Morava Banovinas, and on the east, south and west by the State frontiers with Bulgaria, Greece, and Albania. In 1941, the World War II Axis powers occupied the Vardar Banovina and divided it between Bulgaria, German-occupied Serbia, and Albania under Italy. Following World War II, the southern portion of the region became Socialist Republic of Macedonia while the northern portions were made a part of the Socialist Republic of Serbia, both within the Socialist Federal Republic of Yugoslavia.

== Bans of Vardar Banovina ==
- Živojin Lazić (1929–1932)
- Dobrica Matković (1932–1933)
- Dragoslav Đorđević (1933–1935)
- Ranko Trifunović (1935–1936)
- Dušan Filipović (1936)
- Dragan Paunović (1936–1937)
- Marko Novaković (1937–1939)
- Vladimir Hajduk-Veljković (1939)
- Aleksandar Cvetković (1939)
- Aleksandar Andrejević (1939–1940)
- Žika Rafajlović (1940–1941)

== Cities and towns ==
- Skopje (capital)
- Berovo
- Bitola
- Bosilegrad
- Delčevo
- Debar
- Dragash
- Gevgelija
- Gjilan
- Gostivar
- Makedonski Brod
- Kaçanik
- Kavadarci
- Kičevo
- Kočani
- Kratovo
- Kriva Palanka
- Kruševo
- Kumanovo
- Lebane
- Leskovac
- Negotino
- Ohrid
- Preševo
- Prilep
- Pristina
- Prizren
- Radoviš
- Resen
- Rostuša
- Strumica
- Surdulica
- Suva Reka
- Sveti Nikola
- Štip
- Tetovo
- Ferizaj
- Valandovo
- Veles
- Vladičin Han
- Vranje
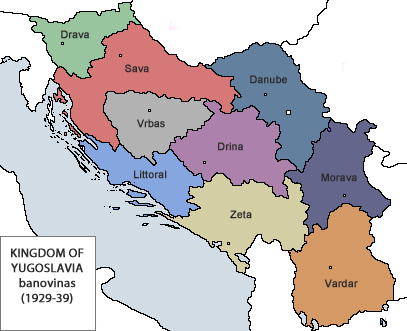
Map of Yugoslav banovinas in 1929 (The Vardar Banovina is #9)

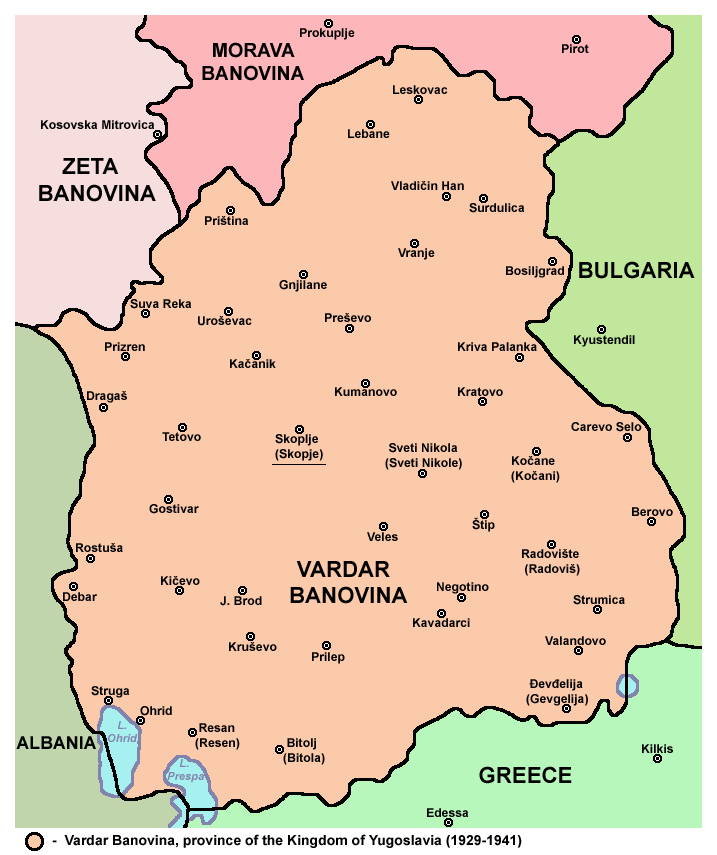
Map of Vardar Banovina

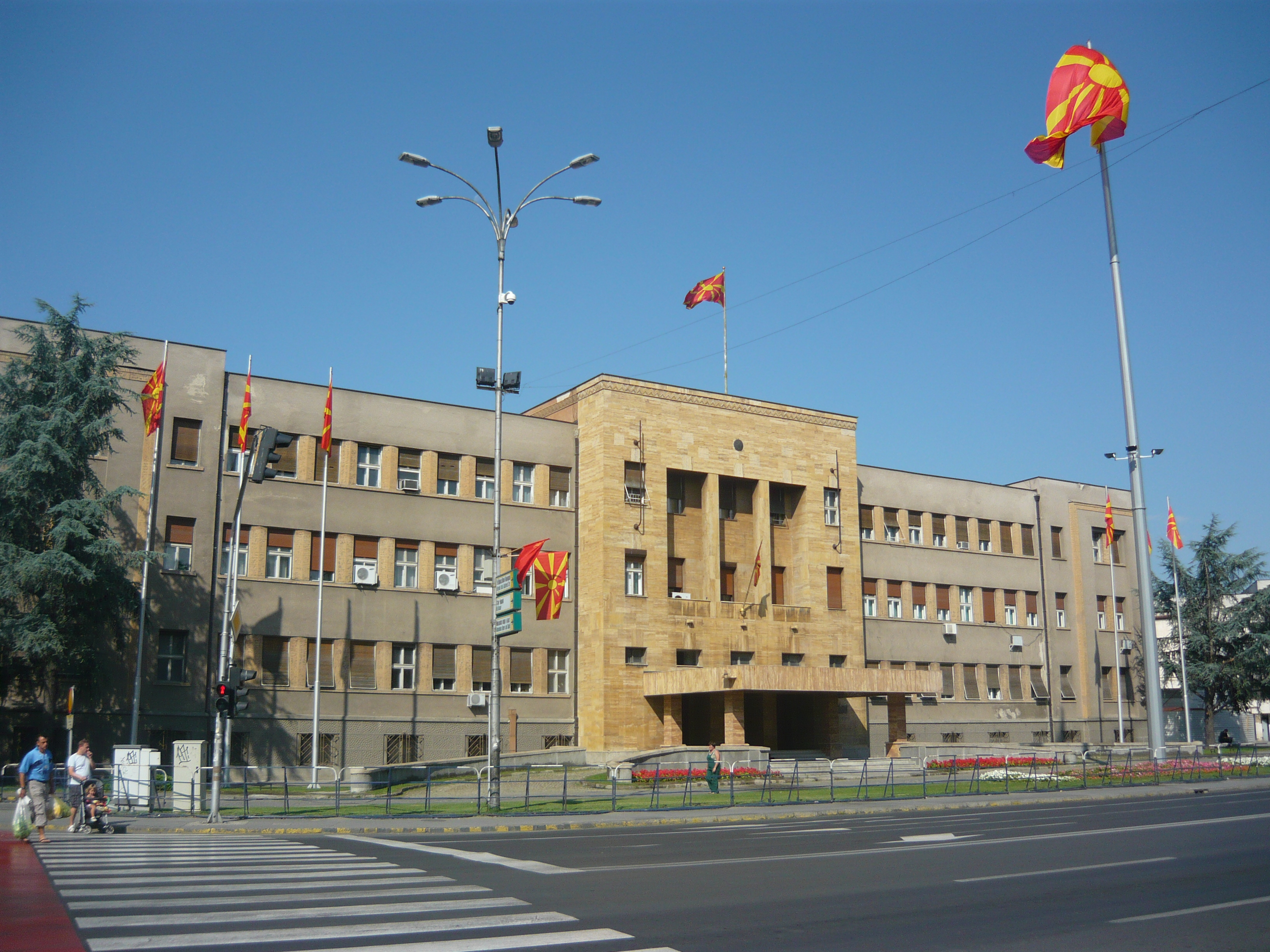
Sobranie Palace, administrative building of Banovina, today Assembly of the Republic of North Macedonia

== See also ==
- Kingdom of Yugoslavia
- Vardar Macedonia
- Administrative divisions of Yugoslavia
