= Vardar Macedonia =

Former territory in the Balkans

Vardar Macedonia (Macedonian and Serbian: Вардарска Македонија, romanized: Vardarska Makedonija) is a historical term referring to the northern part of the broader region of Macedonia, roughly corresponding to the Republic of North Macedonia. The name derives from the Vardar River and is primarily associated with the period of Serbian (1912–1918) and later Yugoslav rule (1918–1991).

== History ==
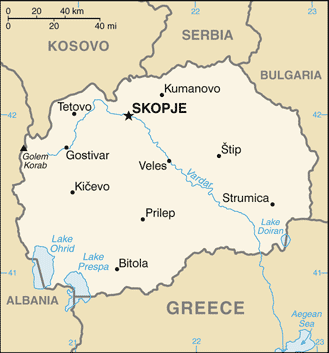
North Macedonia.

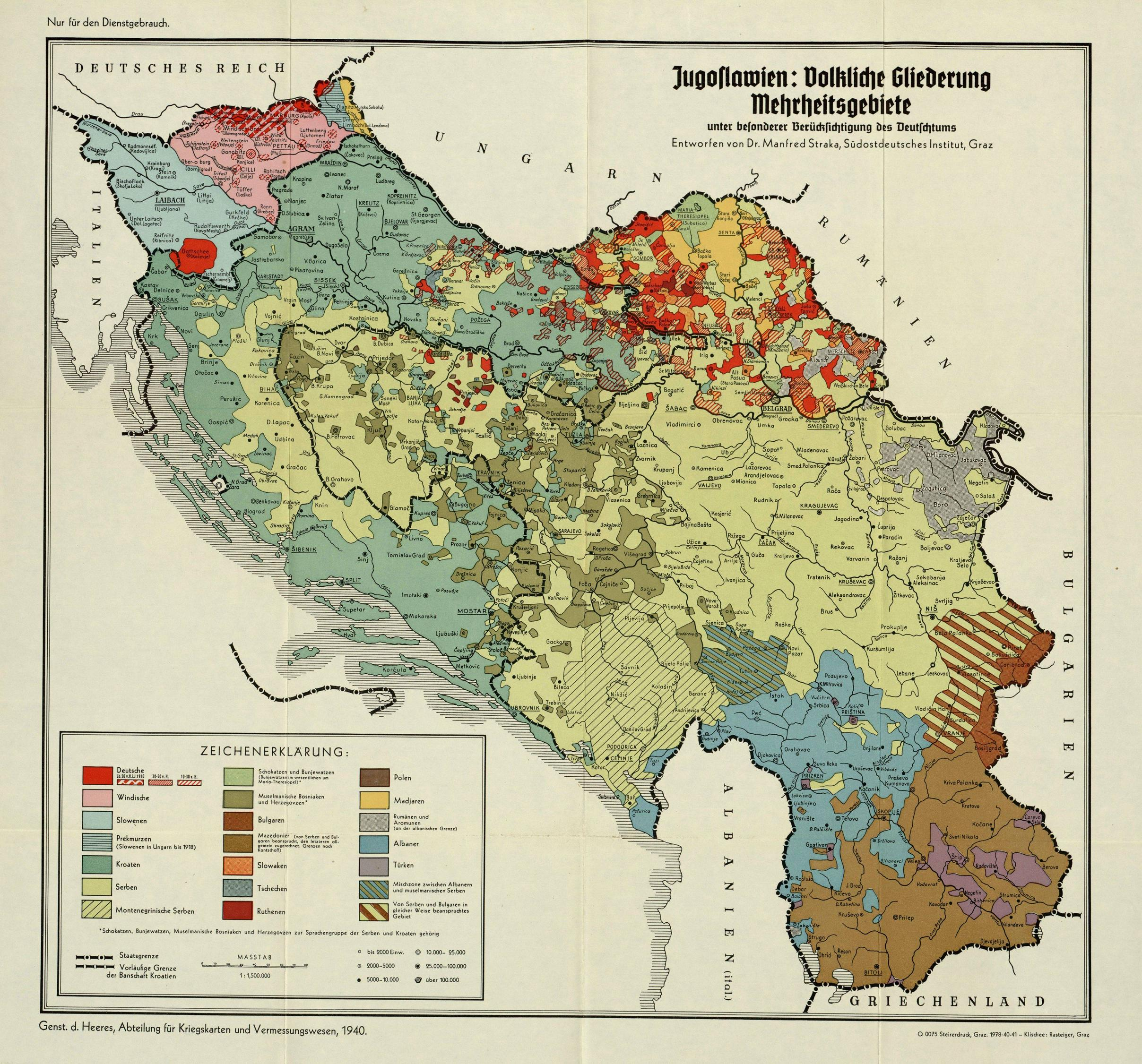
German ethnic map of Yugoslavia from 1940. Macedonians are depicted as a separate community, and described as claimed by Serbs and Bulgarians, but generally attributed to the last ones.

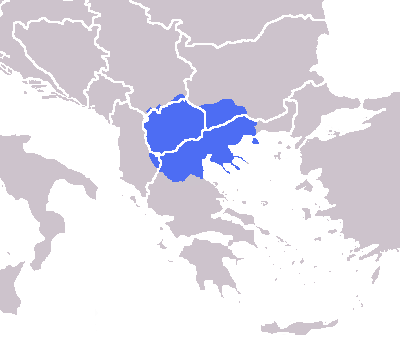
Borders of the modern geographical region of Macedonia, divided by the national boundaries of the neighboring countries. Vardar Macedonia, encompassing North Macedonia; Trgovište, Preševo and Elez Han municipalities in Serbia. Pirin Macedonia, part of southwestern Bulgaria. Macedonia (Greece), part of northern Greece. It also includes parts of eastern-most Albania.

Vardar Macedonia refers to the northern part of the broader region of Macedonia, which became part of the Kingdom of Serbia following the Balkan Wars (1912–1913) and was formally assigned to Serbia by the Treaty of Bucharest. It was named after the Vardar River, distinguishing it from Aegean Macedonia in Greece and Pirin Macedonia in Bulgaria.

The region was initially known as Serbian Macedonia (Serbian: Српска Македонија / Srpska Makedonija) although the use of the name Macedonia was prohibited later in the Kingdom of Yugoslavia, due to the implemented policy of Serbianisation of the local Slavic-speakers. From 1919 to 1922, the area (including parts of today Kosovo and Eastern Serbia) was part of South Serbia (Serbian: Jужна Србија / Južna Srbija), In 1929, the Kingdom of Yugoslavia was divided into provinces called banovinas. Vardar Macedonia as part of South Serbia then became part of Vardar Banovina.

During World War I it was occupied by Bulgaria as part of the Military Inspection Area of Macedonia. After the war the present-day Strumica and Novo Selo municipalities were broken away from Bulgaria and ceded to Yugoslavia. During the Second World War, Bulgaria established two administrative districts in the region – Bitola and Skopje. In August 1944 the Democratic Federal Macedonia was proclaimed with Vardar Macedonia as part of it. In 1945, it became one of the six constituent countries of SFR Yugoslavia and later was renamed in the People's Republic of Macedonia (1946–1963), and finally to Socialist Republic of Macedonia (1963–1991). Before the independence of the Republic of Macedonia, the region was also called Yugoslav Macedonia.

After the breakup of Yugoslavia, besides North Macedonia, the region also encompasses the Trgovište and Preševo municipalities in Central Serbia, as well as the Elez Han municipality in Kosovo.

== See also ==
- Macedonia (Greece)
- Geography of North Macedonia
- Macedonia (terminology)
- Vardar statistical region
- Ottoman Vardar Macedonia
