= Administrative divisions of Yugoslavia =

Yugoslavia had various administrative divisions throughout its 74 years of existence.

== 1918–1922 ==
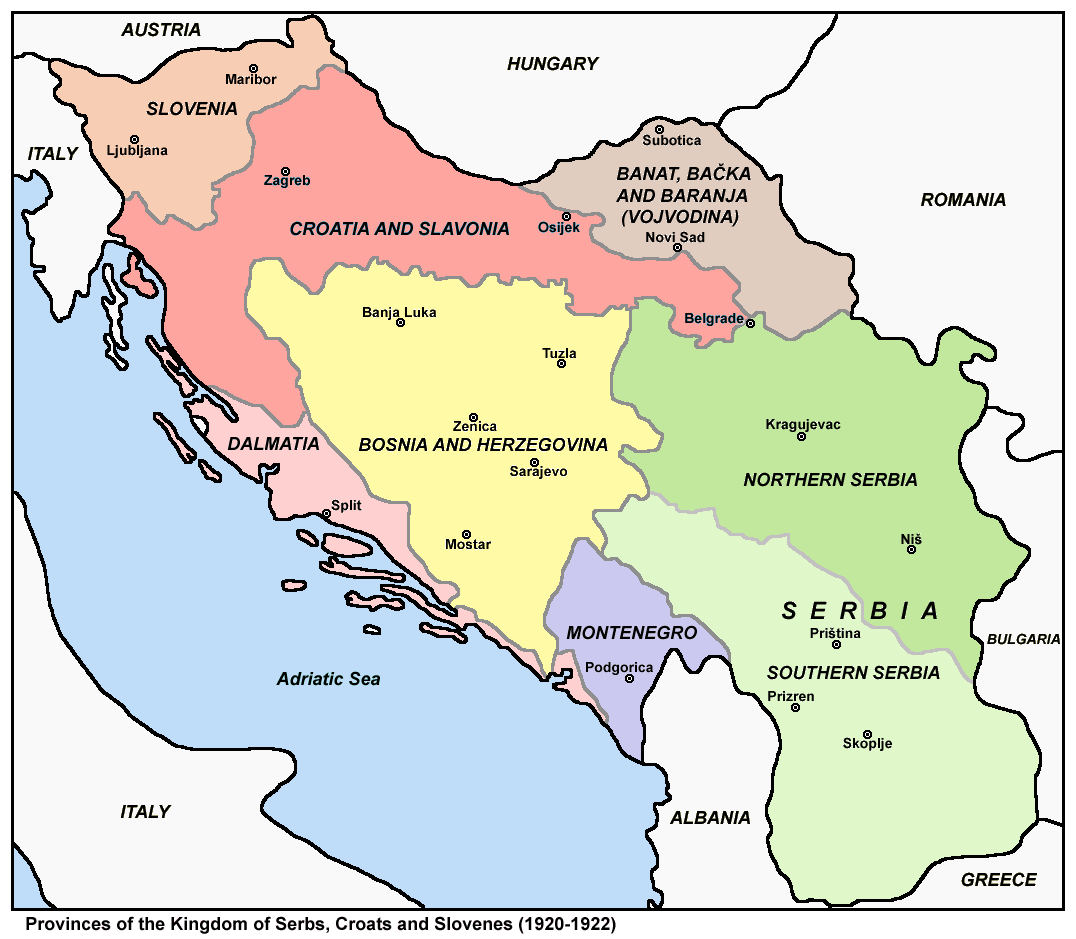
Provinces of the Kingdom of Serbs, Croats and Slovenes

From 1918 to 1922, the Kingdom of Serbs, Croats, and Slovenes continued to be subdivided into the pre-World War I divisions (districts, counties and kingdoms) of the Habsburg monarchy and the formerly independent Balkan kingdoms of Serbia and Montenegro.

The provinces (pokrajine) were:

- Slovenia
- Croatia and Slavonia
- Dalmatia
- Bosnia and Herzegovina
- Banat, Bačka, Baranja
- Serbia
  - Northern Serbia
  - Southern Serbia
- Montenegro

== 1922–1929 ==
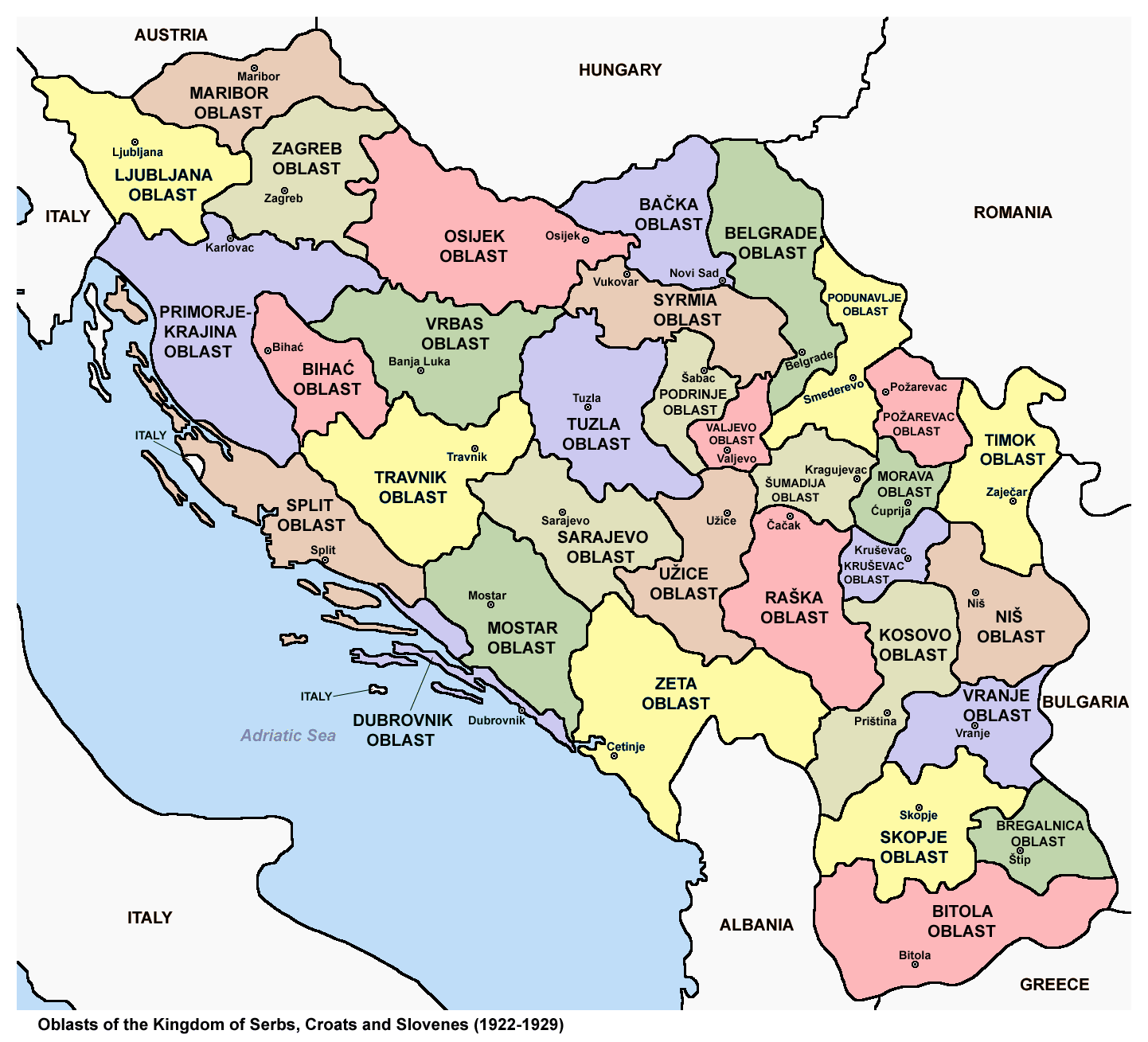
Oblasts of the Kingdom of Serbs, Croats and Slovenes

The Vidovdan Constitution of 1921 established the Kingdom of Serbs, Croats, and Slovenes as a unitary state, instituting 33 new administrative oblasts (provinces) ruled from the center in 1922:

- Vrbas Oblast, Banja Luka
- Belgrade Oblast, Belgrade
- Bihać Oblast, Bihać
- Bitola Oblast, Bitola
- Zeta Oblast, Cetinje
- Oblast of Čačak (Raška Oblast)
- Oblast of Ćuprija
- Oblast of Dubrovnik
- Oblast of Karlovec
- Oblast of Kragujevac (Šumadija Oblast)
- Oblast of Kruševac
- Oblast of Ljubljana
- Maribor Oblast, Maribor
- Oblast of Mostar
- Oblast of Niš
- Bačka Oblast, Novi Sad
- Osijek Oblast, Osijek
- Oblast of Požarevac
- Oblast of Pristina (Kosovo Oblast)
- Oblast of Sarajevo
- Oblast of Smederevo (Podunavlje Oblast)
- Oblast of Split
- Oblast of Skopje
- Oblast of Šabac (Podrinje Oblast)
- Oblast of Štip
- Travnik Oblast, Travnik
- Oblast of Tuzla
- Oblast of Užice (Zlatibor Oblast?)
- Oblast of Valjevo
- Oblast of Vranje
- Syrmia Oblast, Vukovar
- Zagreb Oblast, Zagreb
- Oblast of Zaječar (Timok Oblast)

== 1929–1939 ==
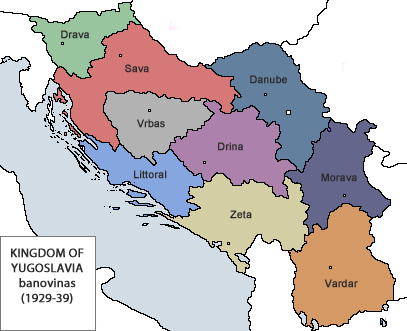
Banovinas of the Kingdom of Yugoslavia

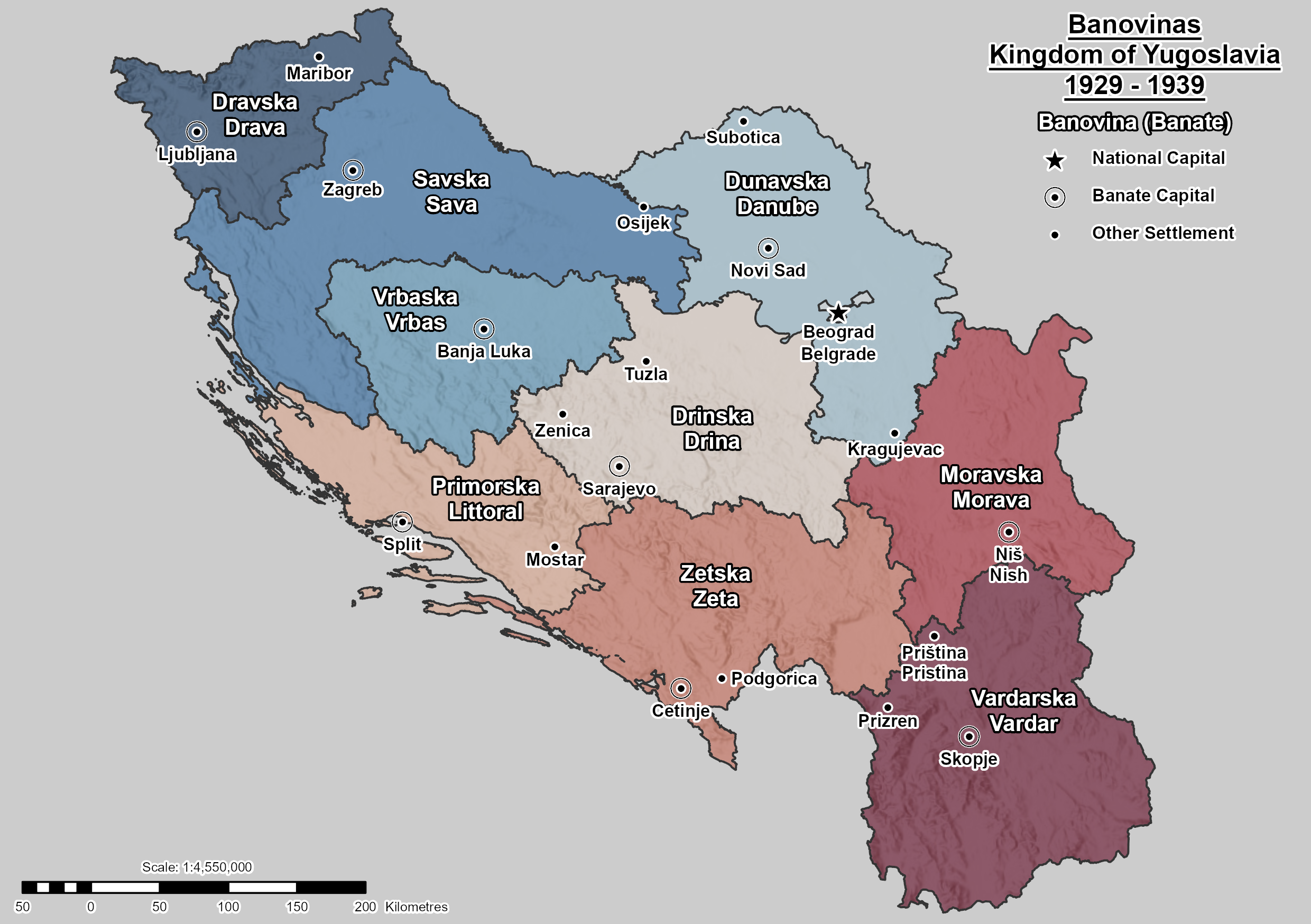
Banovinas 1929-39

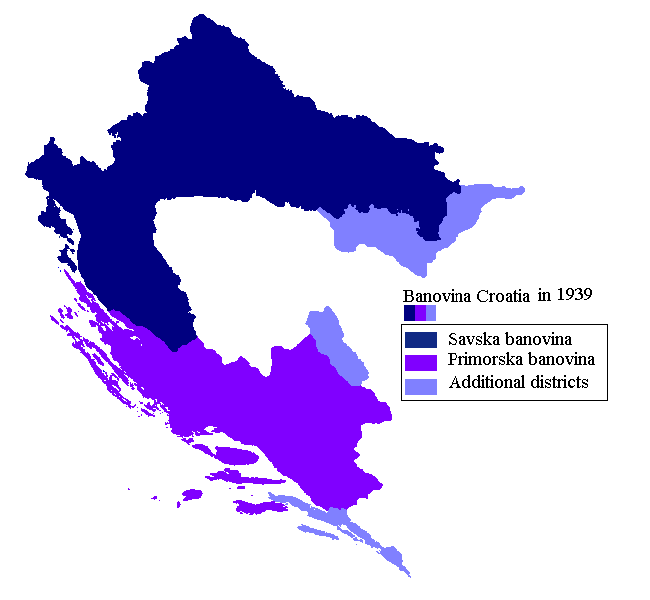
Banovina of Croatia

From 1929, the Kingdom of the Serbs, Croats and Slovenes was renamed to the Kingdom of Yugoslavia and was subdivided into nine new provinces called banovinas. Their borders were intentionally drawn so that they would correspond neither to boundaries between ethnic groups, nor to pre-World War I imperial borders. They were named after various geographic features, mostly rivers. Slight changes to their borders were made in 1931 with the new Yugoslav Constitution. The banovinas were as follows:

- Drava Banovina (Dravska banovina), with its capital in Ljubljana (1929–1941)
- Sava Banovina (Savska banovina), with its capital in Zagreb (1929–1939)
- Littoral Banovina (Primorska banovina), with its capital in Split (1929–1939)
- Vrbas Banovina (Vrbaska banovina), with its capital in Banja Luka (1929–1941)
- Drina Banovina (Drinska banovina), with its capital in Sarajevo (1929–1941)
- Zeta Banovina (Zetska banovina), with its capital in Cetinje (1929–1941)
- Danube Banovina (Dunavska banovina), with its capital in Novi Sad (1929–1941)
- Morava Banovina (Moravska banovina), with its capital in Niš (1929–1941)
- Vardar Banovina (Vardarska banovina), with its capital in Skopje (1929–1941)
- The City Administration of Belgrade, together with Zemun and Pančevo was also an administrative unit.

== 1939–1941 ==
As an accommodation to Yugoslav Croats, the Banovina of Croatia (Banovina Hrvatska) was formed in 1939 from a merger of the Littoral (Maritime) and Sava Banovinas, with some additional territory from the Vrbas and Zeta Banovinas. Like Sava, its capital was Zagreb.

== 1941–1944 ==
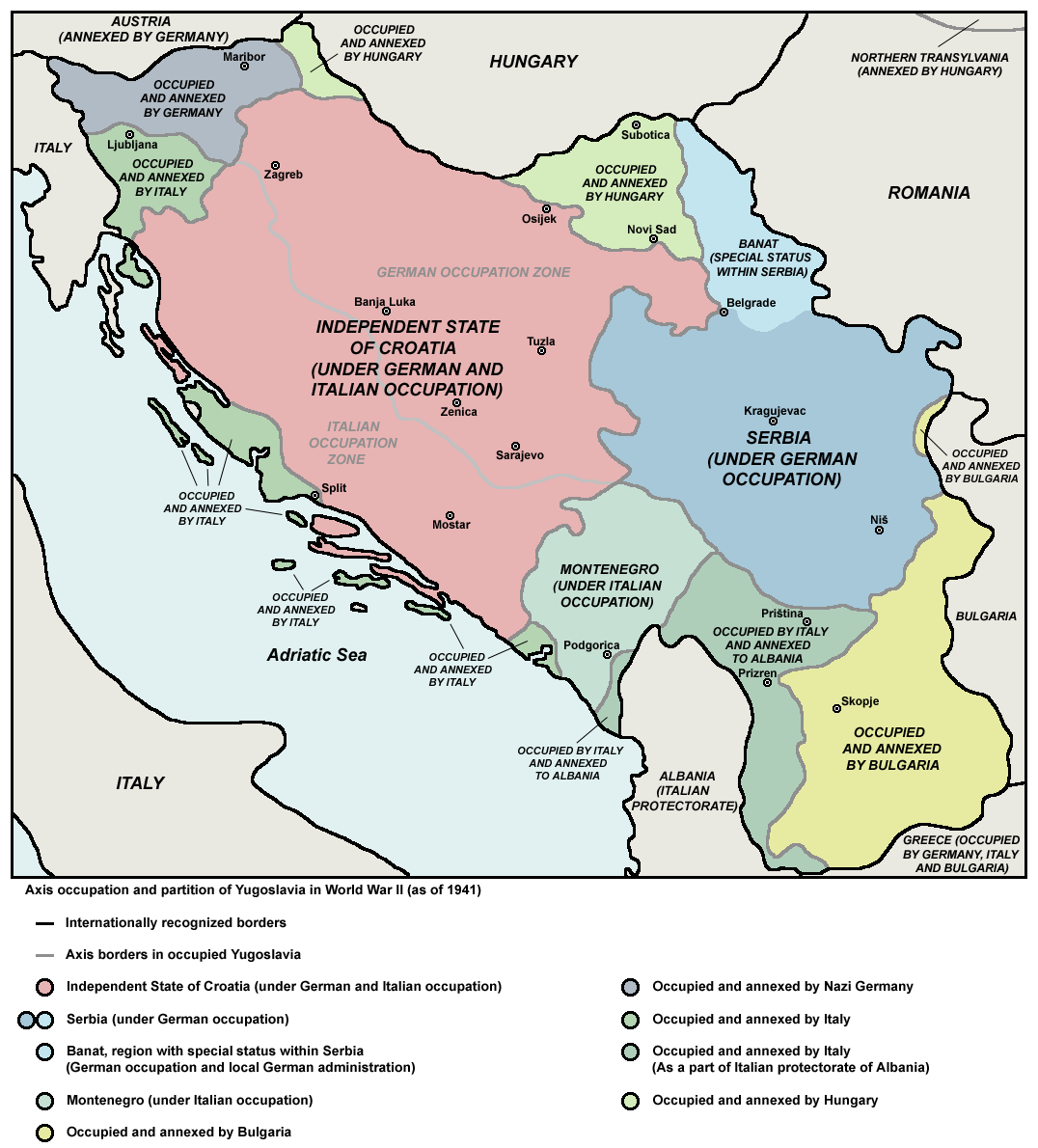
Axis occupation and partition of Yugoslavia in World War II

During World War II, the Kingdom of Yugoslavia was occupied and partitioned by the Axis powers and was divided into 3 Axis puppet states:

- Independent State of Croatia
- Italian governorate of Montenegro (later German occupied territory of Montenegro)
- the Territory of the Military Commander in Serbia (including autonomous German-ruled Banat)

Other parts of the Kingdom of Yugoslavia were occupied by German, Italian, Hungarian, Bulgarian and Albanian Axis troops.

== 1945–1992 ==
Republics and provinces of the SFR Yugoslavia

The Socialist Federal Republic of Yugoslavia was divided into 6 republics and two autonomous provinces:

- Serbia (including the autonomous provinces of Vojvodina and Kosovo)
- Croatia
- Bosnia and Herzegovina
- Macedonia
- Slovenia
- Montenegro

Federal subdivisions were further divided into cities and srezovi, the latter of which were constituted by several municipalities. In 1955, srez level units were abolished. with only cities and municipalities remaining in place. Each Yugoslav republic was free to organize administrative and territorial divisions by its own laws, enabling them to establish, merge, or abolish local and regional units by their own decision.

=== SR Serbia ===
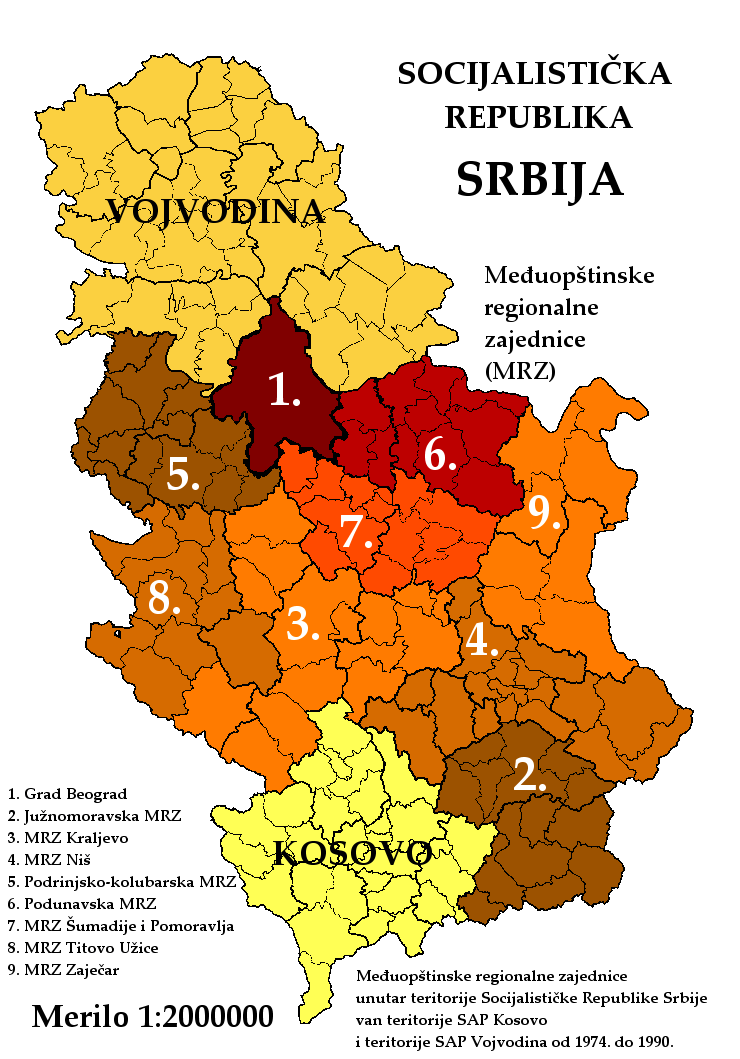
Inter-municipal regional communities in Central Serbia 1974–1990.

In the Socialist Republic of Serbia, the first post-World War II Law on the Administrative Division of Serbia was passed on September 1, 1945. The following Law on People's Committees in 1946 introduced a complex system of local administration, both with administrative and techno-functional units: settlements (villages or small towns), cities which are part of a wider srez, cities with srez status, okrugs, and obasts. The 1946 law did not mention municipalities and instead referred to local people's boards/units as the primary organizational structure.

The first reform of the system was implemented in 1949 with the introduction of the new law, with okrugs being abolished already in 1947 and oblasts in 1951. The 1952 General Law on People's Committees reintroduced municipalities and srezs as the primary units of administrative organization in Serbia with 2,206 municipalities, 47 city municipalities, 7 cities and 126 srezs. With new legal provisions in 1955, the importance of municipalities increased while the rise in their number was stopped and decreased to 737 municipalities and 42 srezs. The 1963 Yugoslav Constitution defined municipalities as the basic socio-political community with rights defined by the constitution, applicable law and local statutes.

The 1974 Yugoslav Constitution requested municipalities to join into Inter-municipal regional communities to which they entrust certain rights and duties in the common interest, and with the legal option to devolve certain responsibilities from the Serbian federal unit to the inter-municipal regional communities level. The special constitutional provisions were given to the City of Belgrade. Excluding the autonomous provinces of Vojvodina and Kosovo (which organized their local self-government) and the City of Belgrade, Central Serbia was divided into eight inter-municipal regional communities with 98 municipalities. These eight communities were Niš (with 15 member municipalities), Kraljevo (with 15 municipalities), Podrinjskokolubarska (with 14 municipalities), South Moravia (with 13 municipalities), Šumadija and Pomoravlje (with 12 municipalities), Podunavlje (with 11 municipalities), Titovo Užice (with 10 municipalities), and Zaječar (with 8 municipalities).

=== SR Croatia ===
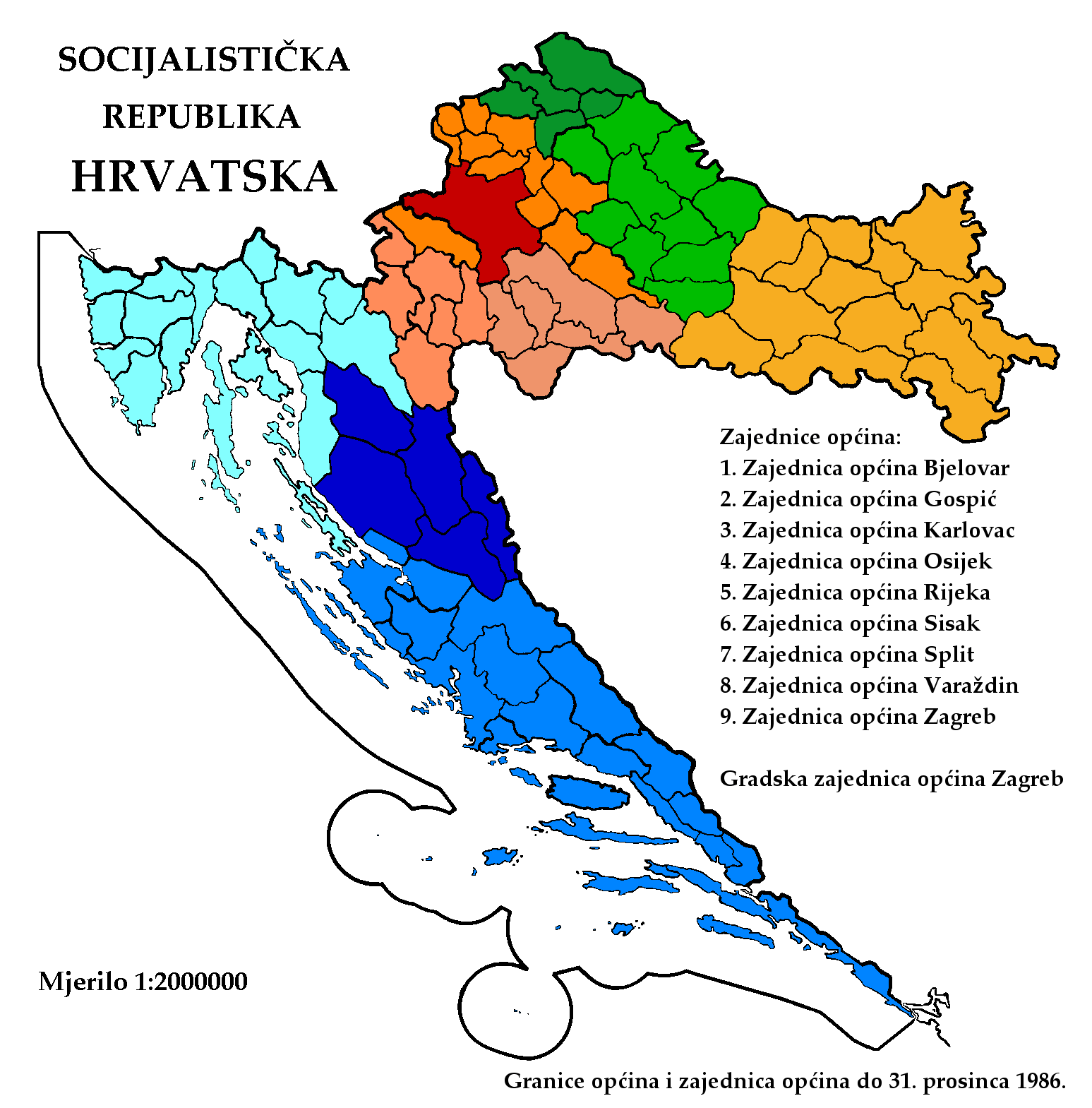
Communities of Municipalities 1974–1986 in Socialist Croatia (colored differently).

In the Socialist Republic of Croatia, srez level units were known as kotars. The socialist epoch was a period of numerous reforms and changes in administrative organization. 1947 law divided Croatia into 81 kotars, 18 cities, and 2278 local people's boards/units. In 1949, the Republic was divided into 6 oblasts (Bjelovar, Osijek, Karlovac, Rijeka, Split, and Zagreb), the latter of which only remained in place until 1951.

In 1952, municipalities (općinas) were reintroduced alongside kotars and cities, leading to significant reform in 1955 when the republic was divided into 299 municipalities and 27 kotars (decreasing the previous number of 737 municipalities and 96 kotars). The number of municipalities was further decreased in following years, reaching the number of 111 municipalities in 1963. Kotars were abolished in 1967, while the new republican constitution of 1974 requested municipalities to join into Communities of Municipalities, with participation becoming voluntary in 1988. Following the first multi party elections and before formal independence, administrative divisions turned into a prominent issue leading to the Croatian War of Independence. The 1990 constitution introduced counties and formally reintroduced (although in practice never implemented) kotars, in the case of the Autonomous Kotar of Knin and the Autonomous Kotar of Glina. The new counties were only effectively defined and introduced in 1992.

=== SR Bosnia and Herzegovina ===
In February of 1942, the Supreme Headquarters of the Yugoslav Partisans introduced some of the first regulations on the formation, organization, and work of the national liberation committees in the free territory known as the Foča Regulations, which defined the local national liberation committees as temporary organs of the people's government to be elected freely and directly by the electorate. The first committees were formed in Bosanska Krajina and east Bosnia, with their numbers rising to 911 villages, 131 municipalities, 19 srezs, and one oblast (Herzegovina) in 1942. At its second session in Sanski Most in 1944, the State Anti-fascist Council for the National Liberation of Bosnia and Herzegovina regulated local national liberation committees' elections, defining them as the "foundation of the people's government in Federal Bosnia and Herzegovina".

In the immediate period after World War II, administrative units in Bosnia and Herzegovina were towns, urban settlements, city regions, cities, srezs and okrugs. In 1946, SR Bosnia and Herzegovina was divided into 7 okrugs, 1 okrug level city, 78 srezs, 9 srez level cities, as well as 1293 local people's committees (albeit decreased in their number from 1947 to 1948.) Between 1949 and 1950, the republic was divided into 4 oblasts (Tuzla, Sarajevo, Mostar, and Banja Luka), 67 srezs, 14 cities (which were not part of srezs), 26 towns (which were part of srezs), and 880 local people's committees. In 1951, the first category of oblasts was abolished. Between 1953 and 1955 (when the new law on municipalities and srezs was introduced), 880 local people's committees were transformed into 363 municipalities, while the number of srezs was reduced to 15 (srezs were abolished in 1966). Over the years, the initial number of 363 municipalities was reduced to 134 in 1959, then to 122 in 1961, and later to 106 in 1966. The number of municipalities was slightly increased to 109 ahead of the 1984 Winter Olympics when some new Sarajevo municipalities were established, which would remain the number until 1992.

=== SR Macedonia ===
In 1953, the Socialist Republic of Macedonia was divided into 86 municipalities and 7 srezs. Following the 1963 Yugoslav Constitution, the official competencies of srezs were abolished and the number of municipalities was reduced to 32.

=== SR Slovenia ===
In 1945, the Act on Administrative Division of Federative Slovenia (Zakon o upravni razdelitvi federalne Slovenije) divided Slovenia into 5 counties (okrožje), which were except for Ljubljana subdivided into 28 districts (okraj), themselves consisting of 1583 townships (kraj). The district town of Ljubljana was divided into 10 quarters (mestna četrt). In 1946, people's committees (ljudski odbor) functioned at various administrative levels. Counties were abolished with a constitutional act in 1947. In 1948, Slovenia was divided into 29 districts and 1264 townships. In 1949, new regional administrative units (oblast) were established; there were four of them (Littoral, Nova Gorica, Maribor, Ljubljana).

In April 1952, townships were abolished. Slovenia was divided into towns, districts, and municipalities (as a new subdivision replacing townships); there were 19 districts and 386 municipalities (of which 44 urban municipalities). In 1955, municipalities were subdivided into communes (komuna) as the basic units of the socialist society. Municipalities lost most of their authority and their number was reduced to 130. In the following years, they regained some power and the number of municipalities was reduced to 83 by 1960. The number of districts was reduced to eight (Celje, Nova Gorica, Koper, Kranj, Ljubljana, Maribor, Murska Sobota, Novo Mesto) by 1960, to four (Celje, Koper, Ljubljana, Maribor) by 1964, and then they were finally abolished with a constitutional act in 1965.

With a new constitution in 1963, municipalities were defined as social and political communities to boost their self-governance. Additionally, local communities (krajevna skupnost) were defined as subdivisions to provide basic amenities and serve as a venue of direct democracy. Only four districts (Celje, Koper, Ljubljana, Maribor) were retained. A stable subdivision into municipalities was established and it changed only rarely until 1994. Towns were defined as consisting of municipalities. The constitution in 1974 increased self-governance of municipalities and local communities.

== See also ==
- Administrative divisions of Serbia
- Administrative divisions of Croatia
- Administrative divisions of Bosnia and Herzegovina
- Administrative divisions of North Macedonia
- Administrative divisions of Slovenia
- Administrative divisions of Montenegro
- Administrative divisions of Serbia and Montenegro
