= Administrative divisions of modern Serbia =

This is a list of historical administrative divisions of Serbia since the establishment of the Principality of Serbia until today.

== Principality of Serbia ==
In 1819, Serbia was organized into 12 nahije (sing. nahija, from Ottoman nahiye), 45 knežine (sing. knežina), 1,396 villages and towns.

In 1833, six nahiye were ceded to Serbia with the "Third Hatišerif", an edict (hatt-i sharif) issued by Sultan Mahmud II (r. 1808–1839). In 1834, the Parliament decided that Serbia be divided on five governorships (serdarstvo) and 19 districts (okrug), thereby ending the form of administrative units that originated in the Ottoman Empire. The districts were in turn divided into captaincies (kapetanije), later called srezovi (sing. srez).

== Kingdom of Serbia ==
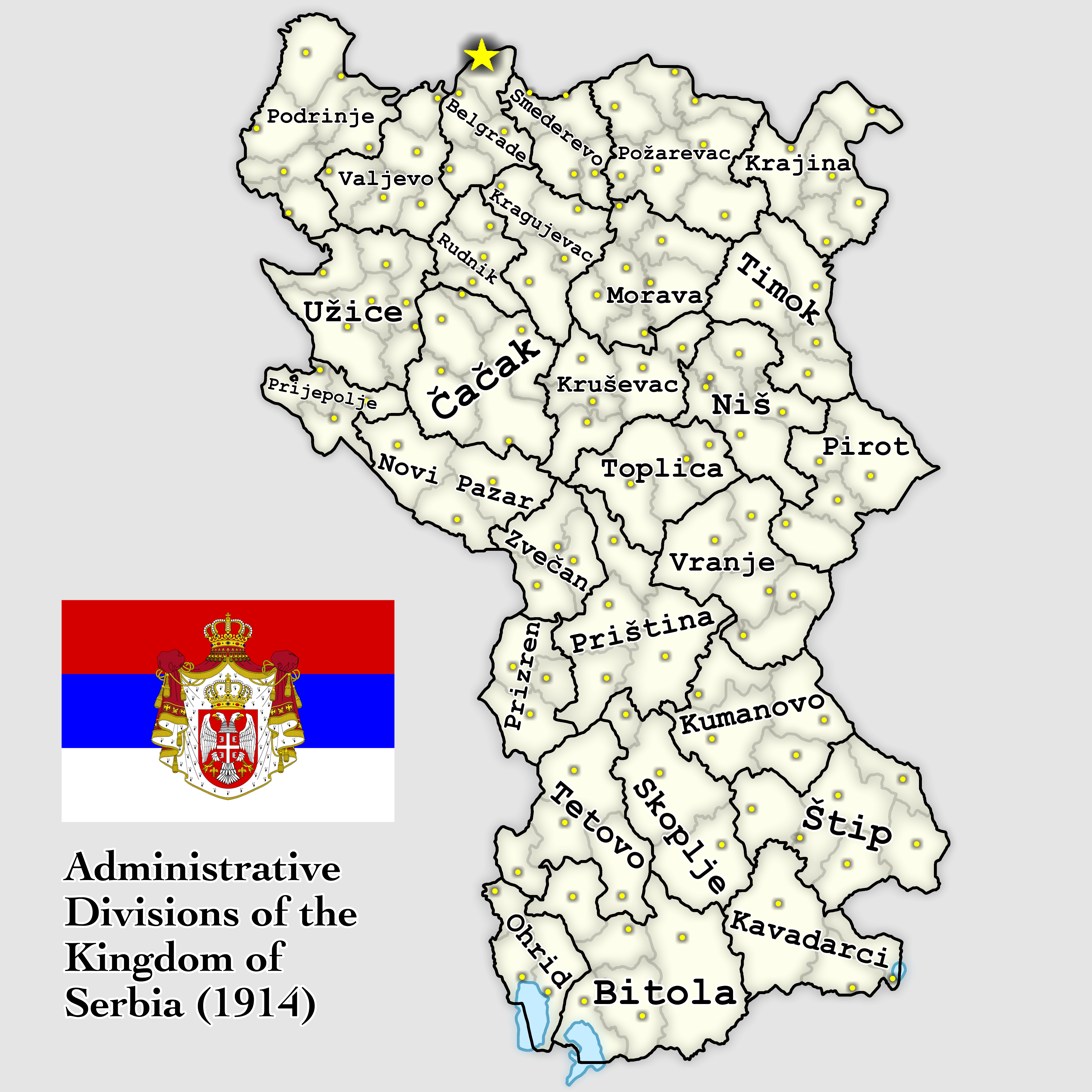
Okrugs of the Kingdom of Serbia 1914

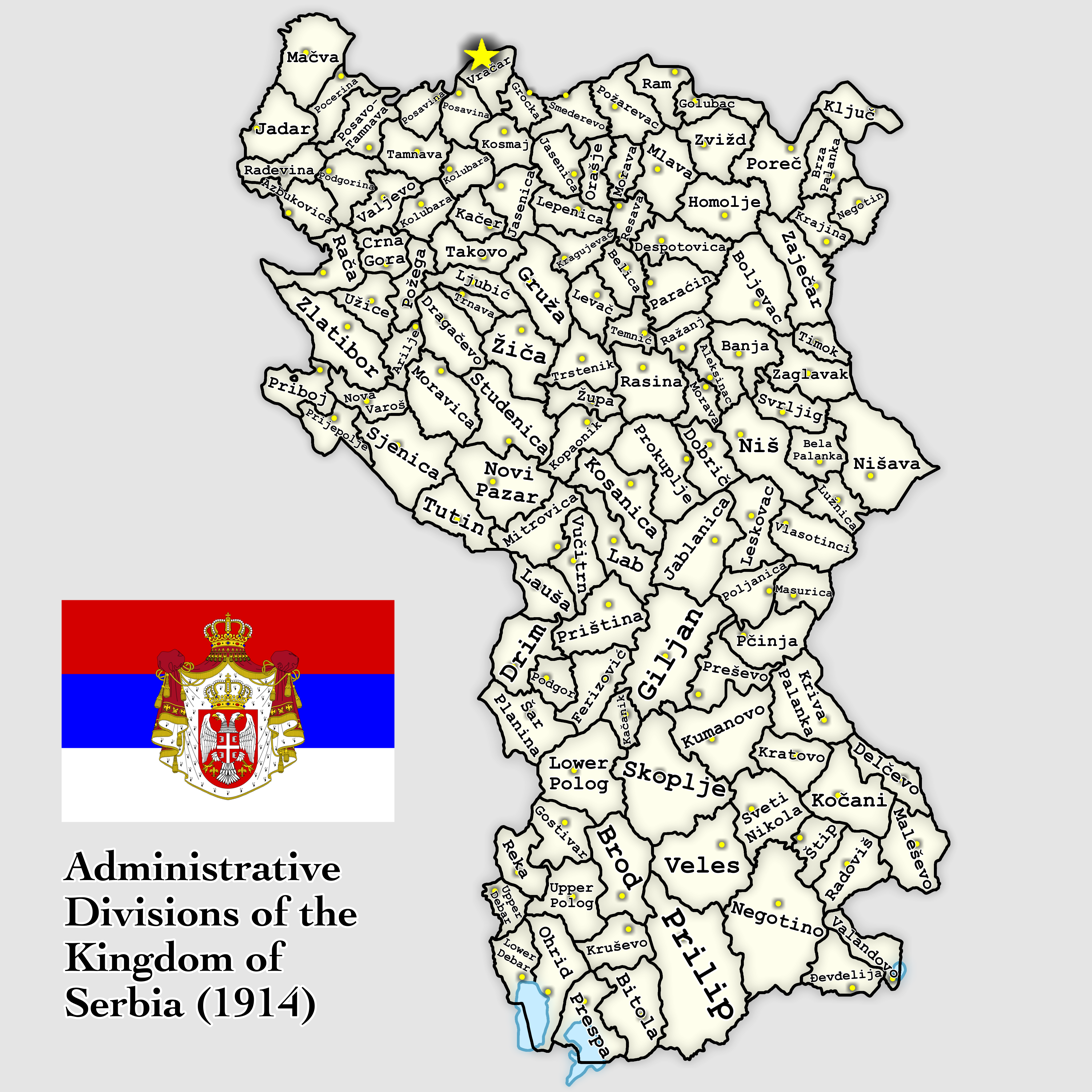
Srez of the Kingdom of Serbia 1914

Serbia gained full internationally recognized independence in 1878 and was proclaimed a kingdom in 1882. In 1890, it was divided into 15 districts (okruzi) which were further divided into counties (srezovi). The cities of Belgrade and Niš had special administrative status. The districts were: Valjevo, Vranje, Kragujevac, Krajina, Kruševac, Morava, Pirot, Podrinje, Podunavlje, Požarevac, Rudnik, Timok, Toplica, Užice and Crna Reka. In 1900 the Podunavlje district was divided into the districts of Belgrade and Smederevo, and in 1902 the district of Čačak was separated from Rudnik district.

In 1912 and 1913 Serbia enlarged its territory after victory in the First Balkan War. In August 1913, 11 new districts were formed in the newly liberated areas: Bitola, Debar, Kavadarci, Novi Pazar, Kumanovo, Pljevlja, Prizren, Priština, Skopje, Štip and Tetovo. A few months later, Pljevlja and Debar districts were abolished and the new Prijepolje and Ohrid districts formed instead. A new Zvečan district was formed as well.

== Kingdom of Serbs, Croats, and Slovenes ==
Provinces

- Serbia
  - North Serbia
  - South Serbia
- Montenegro
- Bosnia and Herzegovina
- Dalmatia
- Croatia and Slavonia
- Slovenia
- Banat, Bačka and Baranja

Oblasts

- Bačka
- Belgrade
- Bihać
- Bitolj
- Bregalnica
- Dubrovnik
- Kosovo
- Ljubljana
- Maribor
- Morava
- Mostar
- Niš
- Osijek
- Podrinje
- Podunavlje
- Požarevac
- Primorje-Krajina
- Kruševac
- Raška
- Sarajevo
- Skoplje
- Split
- Syrmia
- Šumadija
- Timok
- Travnik
- Tuzla
- Užice
- Valjevo
- Vranje
- Vrbas
- Zagreb
- Zeta

== Socialist Republic of Serbia ==
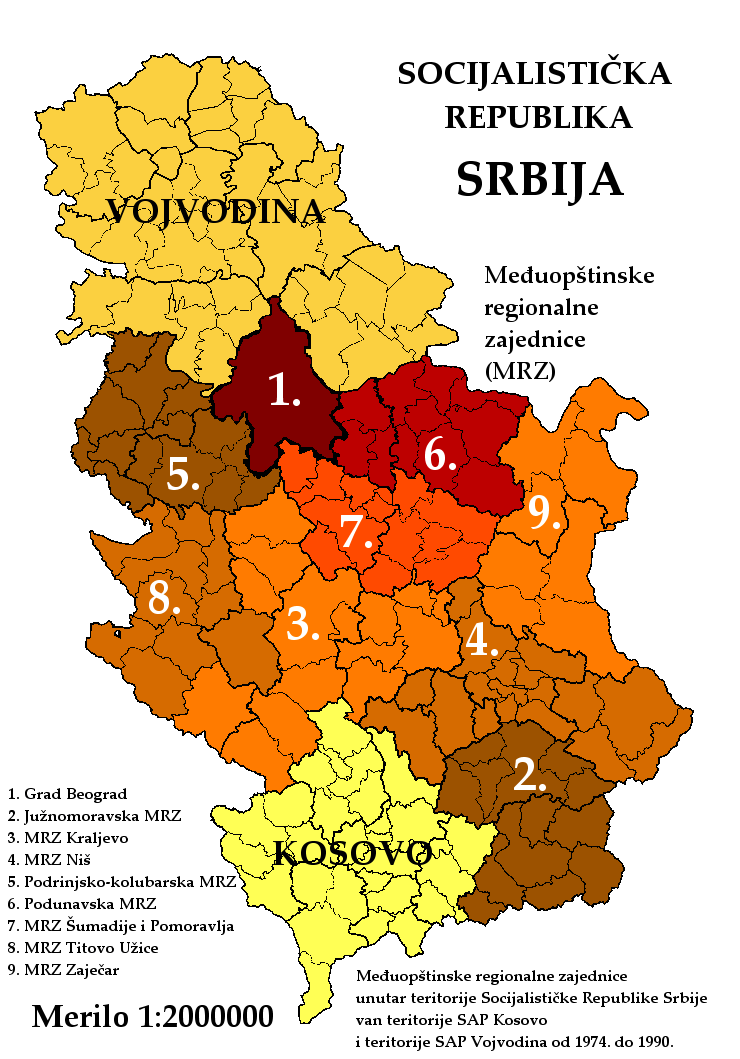
Administrative divisions of Central Serbia from 1974 to 1990

The Socialist Republic of Serbia, and later the Republic of Serbia had a complex administrative division whereby Central Serbia was subdivided into nine Intermunicipal Regional Communities (Međuopštinske regionalne zajednice - MRZ). These were:

2. South Morava (Južnomoravska MRZ, administrative centre in Leskovac),
3. MRZ Kraljevo (administrative centre in Kraljevo),
4. MRZ Niš (administrative centre in Niš),
5. Podrinje-Kolubara (Podrinjsko-kolubarska MRZ, administrative centre in Valjevo),
6. Podunavlje (Podunavska MRZ, administrative centre in Smederevo),
7. Šumadija and Pomoravlje (MRZ Šumadije i Pomoravlja, administrative centre in Kragujevac),
8. MRZ Titovo Užice (administrative centre in Titovo Užice), and
9. MRZ Zaječar (administrative centre in Zaječar).

The City of Belgrade (numbered 1 on the map) was considered the capital city of Serbia and officially designated as the Collectivity of City Municipalities of Belgrade, also known as Greater Belgrade (or the Metropolitan Area of Belgrade) in geographical literature.

== See also ==
- Administrative divisions of medieval Serbia
- Administrative divisions of Serbia
