= Subdivisions of the Kingdom of Yugoslavia =

Structure of subdivisions of the Kingdom of Yugoslavia

The subdivisions of the Kingdom of Yugoslavia (initially known as the Kingdom of Serbs, Croats, and Slovenes) existed successively in three different forms. From 1918 to 1922, the Kingdom of Yugoslavia maintained the pre-World War I subdivisions of Yugoslavia's predecessor states. In 1922, the state was divided into 33 oblasts or provinces and, in 1929, a new system of nine banates (in Serbo-Croatian, the word for "banate" is banovina) was implemented.

== Pre-Yugoslav subdivisions (1918–1922) ==
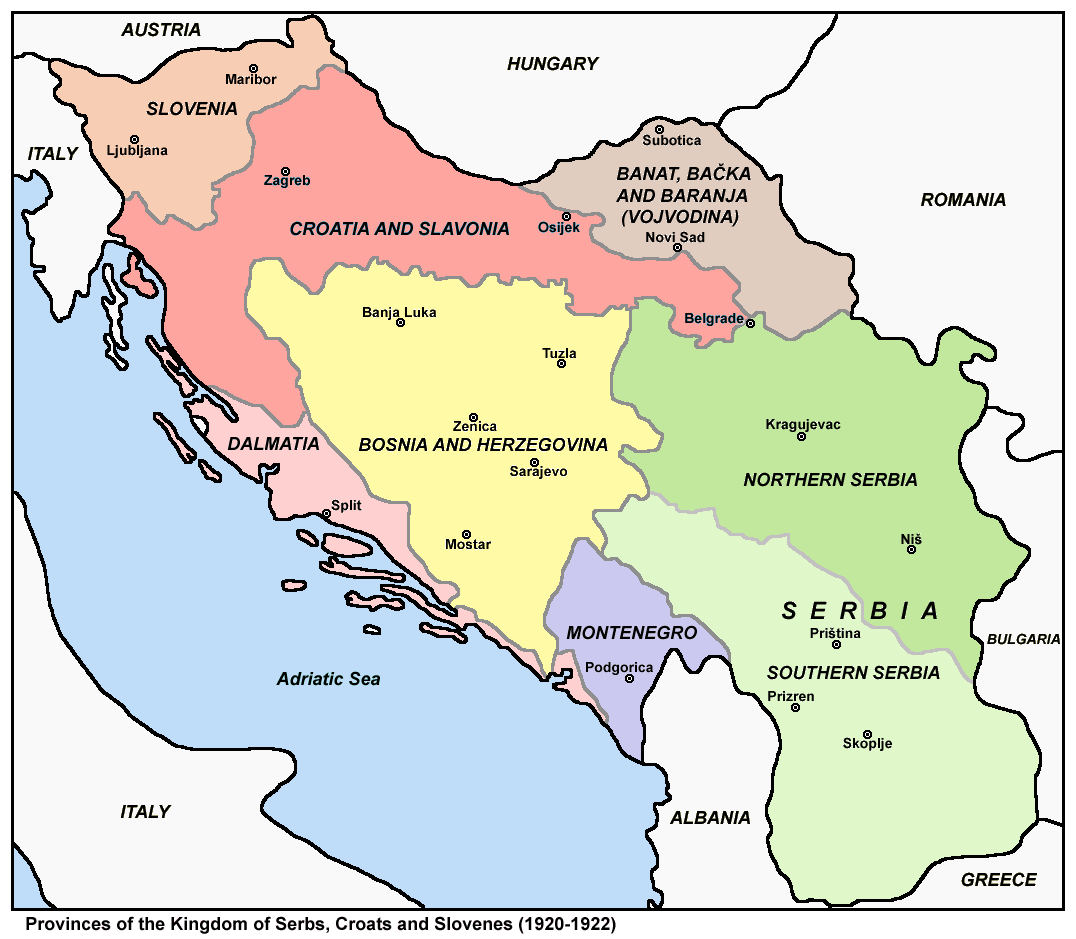
Provinces of the Kingdom of Serbs, Croats and Slovenes (1918–1922).

Kingdom of Croatia-Slavonia counties from Austria-Hungary remained until 1922

From 1918 to 1922, Kingdom of Serbs, Croats, and Slovenes continued to be subdivided into the pre-World War I divisions of Austria-Hungary and the formerly independent kingdoms of Serbia and Montenegro.

Provinces (pokrajine) were:

1. Slovenia
2. Croatia and Slavonia
3. Dalmatia
4. Bosnia and Herzegovina
5. Banat, Bačka and Baranja
6. Serbia
  1. Northern Serbia
  2. Southern Serbia
7. Montenegro

These were subdivided into districts and counties:

1. District of Andrijevica (former Montenegro)
2. District of Banja Luka (former Austria-Hungary)
3. District of Bar (former Montenegro)
4. District of Belgrade (former Serbia)
5. District of Berane (former Montenegro)
6. District of Bihać (former Austria-Hungary)
7. District of Bijelo Polje (former Montenegro)
8. County of Bjelovar (former County of Bjelovar-Križevci, Austria-Hungary)
9. District of Bitola (former Serbia)
10. District of Čačak (former Serbia)
11. District of Cetinje (former Montenegro)
12. District of Ćuprija (District of Morava; former Serbia)
13. County of Dubrovnik (former Austria-Hungary)
14. District of Gornji Milanovac (District of Rudnica; former Serbia)
15. County of Gospić (former County of Lika-Krbava, Austria-Hungary)
16. District of Kavadarci (District of Tikveš; former Serbia)
17. District of Kolašin (former Montenegro)
18. District of Kosovska Mitrovica (District of Zvečan; former Serbia)
19. County of Kotor (former Austria-Hungary)
20. District of Kragujevac (former Serbia)
21. District of Kruševac (former Serbia)
22. District of Kumanovo (former Serbia)
23. County of Ljubljana (former Austria-Hungary)
24. County of Maribor (former Austria-Hungary)
25. District of Mostar (former Austria-Hungary)
26. District of Negotin (District of Krajina; former Serbia)
27. District of Nikšić (former Montenegro)
28. District of Niš (former Serbia)
29. District of Novi Pazar (District of Raška; former Serbia)
30. District of Novi Sad (former Austria-Hungary)
31. County of Ogulin (former County of Modruš-Rijeka, Austria-Hungary)
32. District of Ohrid (former Serbia)
33. County of Osijek (former County of Virovitica, Austria-Hungary)
34. District of Peć (District of Metohija; former Montenegro)
35. District of Pirot (former Serbia)
36. District of Pljevlja (former Montenegro)
37. District of Podgorica (former Montenegro)
38. District of Požarevac (former Serbia)
39. County of Požega (former Austria-Hungary)
40. District of Prijepolje (former Serbia)
41. District of Priština (District of Kosovo; former Serbia)
42. District of Prizren (former Serbia)
43. District of Prokuplje (District of Toplica; former Serbia)
44. District of Šabac (District of Podrinje; former Serbia)
45. District of Sarajevo (former Austria-Hungary)
46. County of Šibenik (former Austria-Hungary)
47. District of Skopje (former Serbia)
48. District of Smederevo (former Serbia)
49. County of Split (former Austria-Hungary)
50. District of Štip (District of Bregalnica; former Serbia)
51. District of Tetovo (former Serbia)
52. District of Travnik (former Austria-Hungary)
53. District of Tuzla (former Austria-Hungary)
54. District of Užice (former Serbia and North Montenegro)
55. District of Valjevo (former Serbia)
56. County of Varaždin (former Austria-Hungary)
57. District of Veliki Bečkerek (former Austria-Hungary)
58. District of Vranje (former Serbia)
59. County of Vukovar (County of Syrmia; former Austria-Hungary)
60. County of Zagreb (former Austria-Hungary)
61. District of Zaječar (former Serbia)

== Oblasts (1922–1929) ==
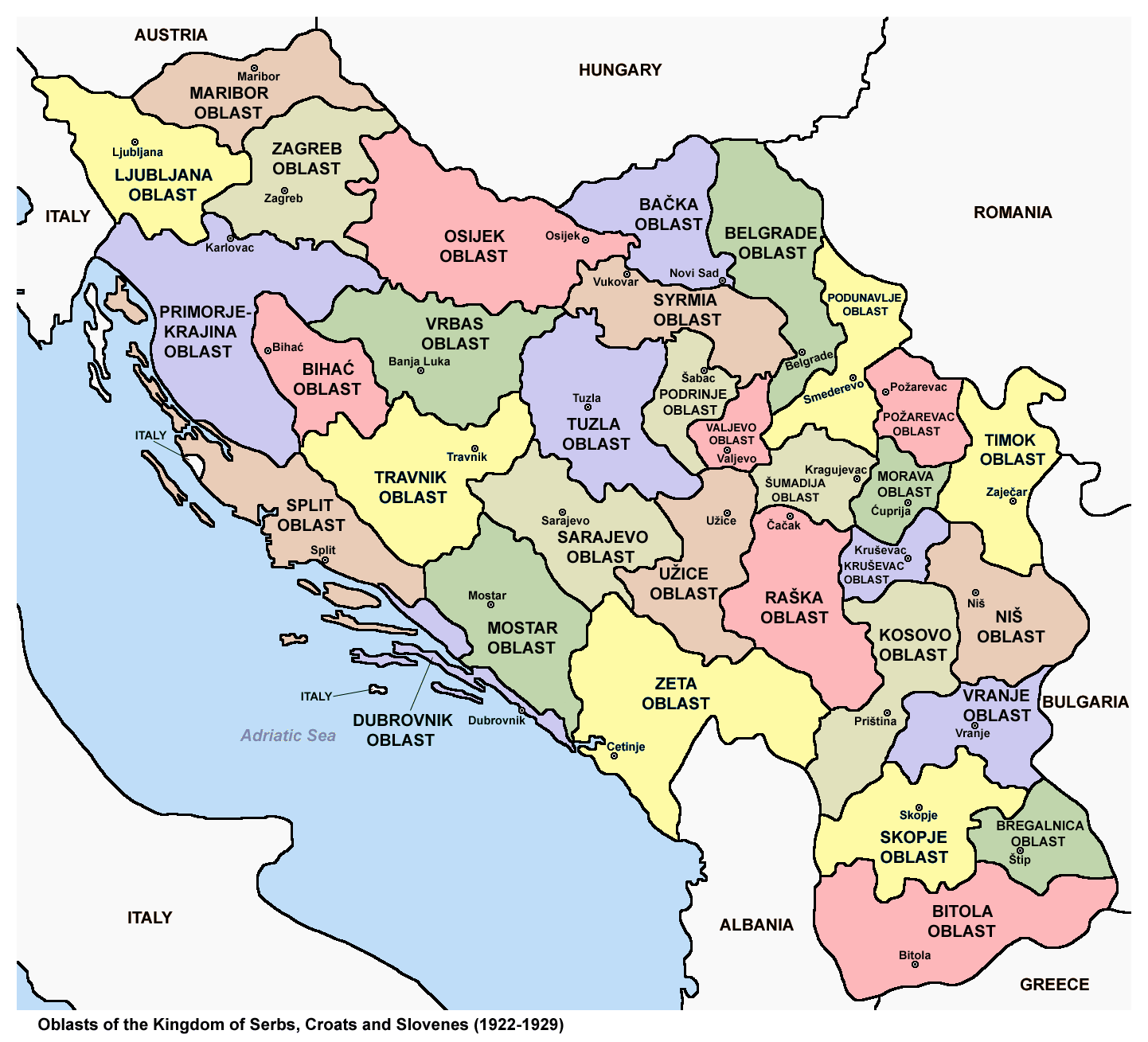
Oblasts of the Kingdom of Serbs, Croats, and Slovenes

The Vidovdan Constitution of 1921 established the Kingdom of Serbs, Croats, and Slovenes as a unitary state and, in 1922, 33 new administrative oblasts (counties) ruled from the centre were instituted. These bore no relation to the earlier divisions and, in the interest of promoting Yugoslavism, statism and multiculturalism, were not given any ethnic or national names. They were largely named after rivers, regions and cities from which they were administered. They were unpopular in parts of the country since their formation, which led to the creation of banates.

1. Oblast of Banja Luka (Vrbas Oblast)
2. Oblast of Belgrade
3. Oblast of Bihać
4. Oblast of Bitola
5. Oblast of Čačak (Raška Oblast)
6. Oblast of Cetinje (Zeta Oblast)
7. Oblast of Ćuprija
8. Oblast of Dubrovnik
9. Oblast of Karlovac (Primorsko-Krajina Oblast)
10. Oblast of Kragujevac (Šumadija Oblast)
11. Oblast of Kruševac
12. Oblast of Ljubljana
13. Oblast of Maribor
14. Oblast of Mostar
15. Oblast of Niš
16. Oblast of Novi Sad (Bačka Oblast)
17. Oblast of Osijek
18. Oblast of Požarevac
19. Oblast of Priština (Kosovo Oblast)
20. Oblast of Šabac (Podrinje Oblast)
21. Oblast of Sarajevo
22. Oblast of Skopje
23. Oblast of Smederevo (Podunavlje Oblast)
24. Oblast of Split
25. Oblast of Štip
26. Oblast of Travnik
27. Oblast of Tuzla
28. Oblast of Užice (Zlatibor Oblast?)
29. Oblast of Valjevo
30. Oblast of Vranje
31. Oblast of Vukovar (Syrmia Oblast)
32. Oblast of Zagreb
33. Oblast of Zaječar (Timok Oblast)

== Banates (banovinas; 1929–1941) ==
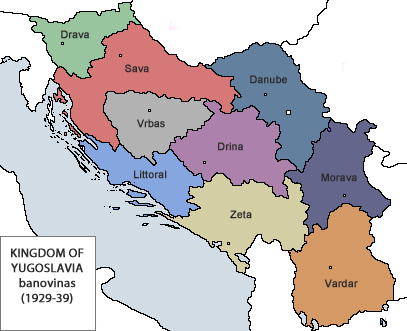
Banates (banovinas) of the Kingdom of Yugoslavia between 1929 and 1939

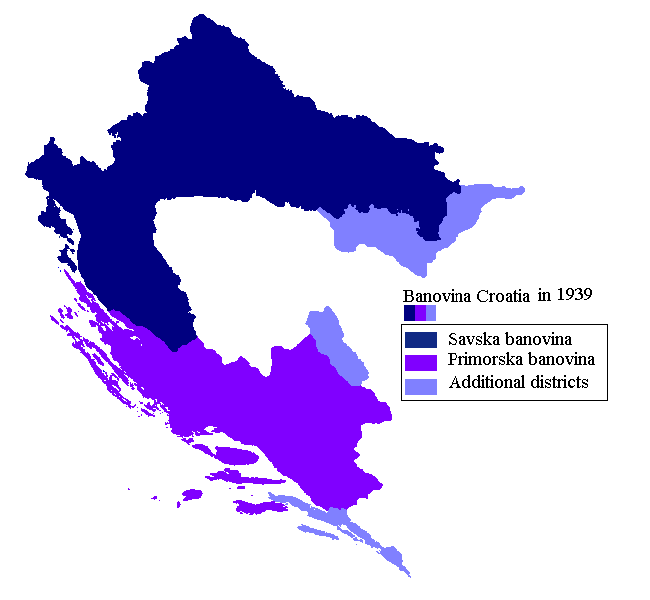
By creating Banovina Croatia in 1939, the regime wanted to solve the Croatian question in Yugoslavia.

From 1929, the kingdom was subdivided into nine new provinces or banates called banovinas. Their borders were intentionally drawn so that they would not correspond either to boundaries between ethnic groups, or to pre-World War I imperial borders. Except for the Littoral Banovina, they were named after major rivers. Slight changes to their borders were made in 1931 with the new Yugoslav Constitution. The banates (banovinas) were as follows:

1. Danube Banovina (Dunavska banovina), capital: Novi Sad
2. Drava Banovina (Dravska banovina), capital: Ljubljana
3. Drina Banovina (Drinska banovina), capital: Sarajevo
4. Littoral Banovina (Primorska banovina), capital: Split
5. Morava Banovina (Moravska banovina), capital: Niš
6. Sava Banovina (Savska banovina), capital: Zagreb
7. Vardar Banovina (Vardarska banovina), capital: Skopje
8. Vrbas Banovina (Vrbaska banovina), capital: in Banja Luka
9. Zeta Banovina (Zetska banovina), capital: in Cetinje

The City of Belgrade, together with Zemun and Pančevo was also an administrative unit independent of the surrounding Danube Banovina.

=== Banovina of Croatia (1939–1941) ===
As an accommodation to Croatian politicians in the Cvetković-Maček Agreement, the Banovina of Croatia (Banovina Hrvatska) was formed in 1939 from a merger of the Littoral and Sava Banovinas, with some additional territory from the Drina, Dunav, Vrbas and Zeta Banovinas where ethnic Croats formed the majority of the population. Like Sava, its capital was Zagreb, the second largest city in the country.

== See also ==
- United States of Greater Austria
- Kingdom of Yugoslavia
