= Municipalities in Bosnia and Herzegovina =

Third-level administrative divisions of Bosnia and Herzegovina

Map of the municipalities of Bosnia and Herzegovina, showing the FBiH in blue, the RS in red, and Brčko District in yellow.

In Bosnia and Herzegovina, the smallest administrative unit is the municipality ("opština/општина" or "općina/опћина" in the official languages and scripts of the country). Prior to the 1992–95 Bosnian War there were 109 municipalities in what was then Socialist Republic of Bosnia and Herzegovina. Ten of these formed the area of the capital Sarajevo.

After the war, the number of municipalities was increased to 143, grouped in the following way:

- 79 municipalities constitute the Federation of Bosnia and Herzegovina (FBiH), which comprises 51% of the country's total territory. The municipalities within the federation are grouped into ten cantons.
- 64 municipalities constitute the Republika Srpska (RS), which comprises 49% of the country's total territory.

In addition, Brčko District does not belong to either entity and is governed as a condominium of both FBiH and RS entities. The district corresponds to the pre-war Brčko municipality. Although technically not called a municipality, it is treated as such for statistic purposes.

Administratively, each municipality has a municipality council and a municipality head, and they usually consist of an urban area with the surrounding villages and rural areas around it. Bosnia and Herzegovina also has 36 officially designated cities: Brčko, Banja Luka, Bihać, Tuzla, Mostar, Zenica, Doboj, Prijedor, Bijeljina, Trebinje, Široki Brijeg, Cazin, Goražde, Livno, Zvornik, Gradiška, Živinice, Gračanica, Srebrenik, Gradačac, Visoko, Ljubuški, Čapljina, Derventa, Lukavac, Zavidovići, Konjic, Bosanska Krupa, Orašje, Stolac, Laktaši, Prnjavor, Teslić and Novi Travnik each correspond to a single eponymous municipality. The cities of Sarajevo and Istočno Sarajevo consist of four and six municipalities respectively, which roughly correspond to the ten pre-war municipalities which constituted the capital city.

== History ==
=== Austria-Hungary ===
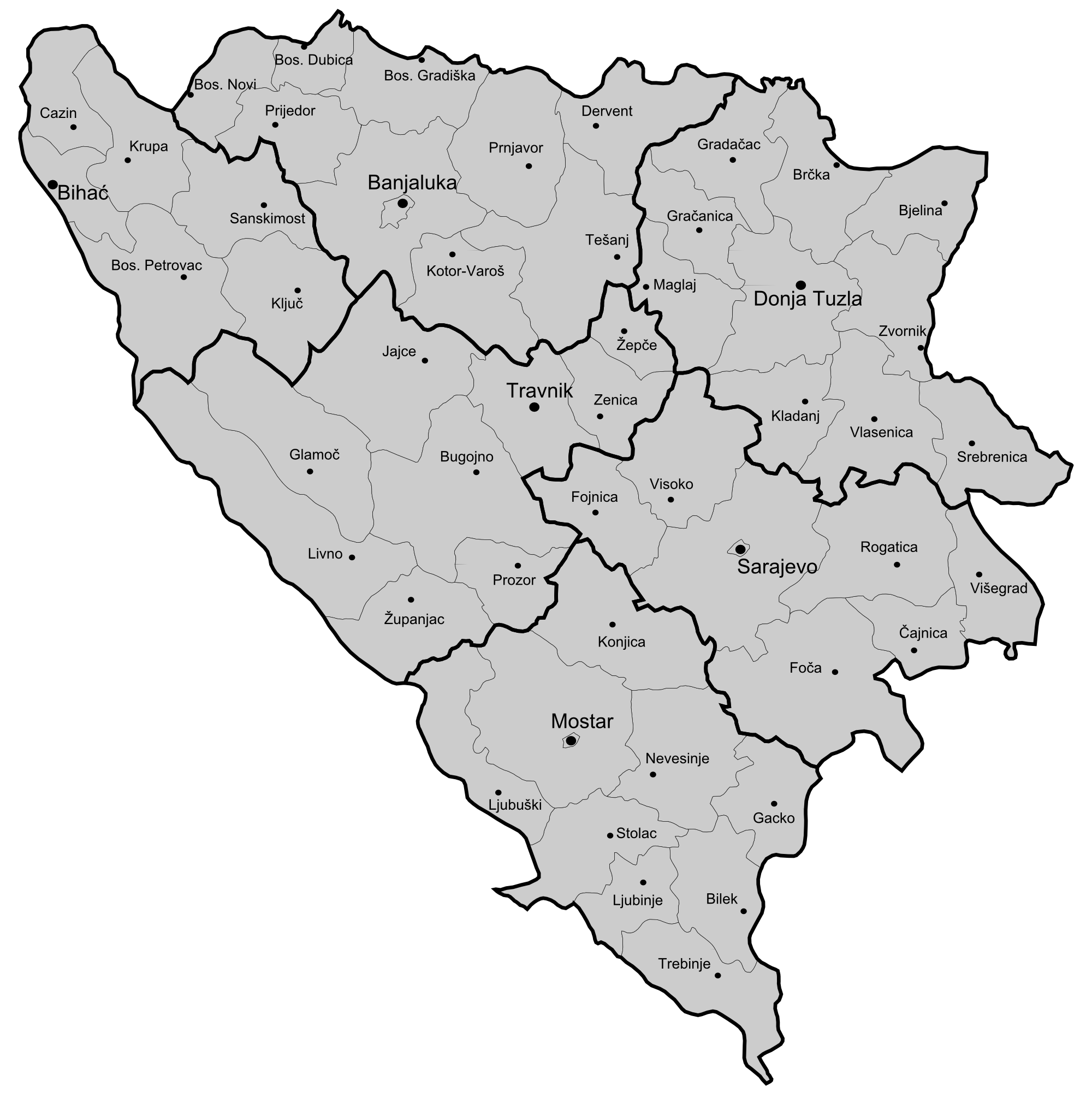
Administrative division of Bosnia and Herzegovina from 1895 showing the land being divided into okrugs and kotars

In 1878, the territory of present-day Bosnia and Herzegovina was occupied by Austria-Hungary. Austria-Hungary retained in principle the Ottoman administrative division, thus Bosnia vilayet became a Reichsland, sanjaks became okrugs (German: Kreise), kazas became kotars (German: Bezirke), while nahiyahs became outposts (German: Expositure; Serbo-Croatian: ispostava). In the same order, a wali became a land master (German: Landesschef; Serbo-Croatian: zemaljski poglavar), while a mutasarrif (administrator of a sanjak) became a county superior (German: Kreiseleiter; Serbo-Croatian: orkužni predstojnik). The Austrian-Hungarian occupation also adopted the Ottoman municipal self-administration present in rural and urban municipalities, the baladiyahs.

=== Kingdom of Yugoslavia ===
In 1918, the territory of present-day Bosnia and Herzegovina was incorporated into the Kingdom of Serbs, Croats and Slovenes, renamed in 1929 into the Kingdom of Yugoslavia. The new government retained the local organisation it inherited from Austria-Hungary. Although the new Vidovdan Constitution foresaw the division of the country into oblasts, the new state established the Regional Administration that governed Bosnia and Herzegovina. On 26 April 1922, the Law on Regional and Districtorial Self-Administration was adopted to implement the constitutional division of the country into oblasts. According to the law, the country was divided into 33 oblasts. The territory of present-day Bosnia and Herzegovina was thus supposed to be divided into 6 oblasts: Bihać Oblast, Mostar Oblast, Sarajevo Oblast, Travnik Oblast, Tuzla Oblast and Vrbas Oblast. However, the law wasn't enforced in Bosnia and Herzegovina until the abolishment of the Regional Administration in 1924. The head of the oblast was a grand župan Serbo-Croatian: veliki župan), while the head of the srez (district) was the district head Serbo-Croatian: sreski poglavar). Further, the srezs were divided into the srez outposts Serbo-Croatian: sreska ispostava.

On 6 January 1929, King Alexander imposed a dictatorship and soon enacted the Law on the Municipal and Oblast Self-Administration. The new law replaced the oblast committees and assemblies with the oblast commissars. On 3 October 1929, he enacted the Law on the name and the division of the Kingdom into administrative areas. By the new law, the name of the country was changed to Yugoslavia, while the administrative rule was exercised through banovinas, srezs and municipalities (Serbo-Croatian: općina). There were 9 banovinas, each headed by a ban. Under the Law on Internal Administration of 19 June 1929, the banates were divided into srezs, and srezs into municipalities. The head of the srez was the srez president (Serbo-Croatian: sreski načelnik). Under the Law on the Municipalities of 14 March 1933, the municipality was headed by the municipal president.

The territory of present-day Bosnia and Herzegovina was divided among 4 banovinas: Drina Banovina, Littoral Banovina, Vrbas Banovina and Zeta Banovina. On 26 August 1939, the Decree on Banovina of Croatia was enacted, and under the decree, Sava Banovina and Littoral Banovina were joined, together with the srezs of Dubrovnik, Šid, Ilok (located in present-day Croatia), Brčko, Derventa, Gradačac, Travnik and Fojnica (located in present-day Bosnia and Herzegovina) into Banovina of Croatia.

=== Socialist Republic ===
On 16 August 1945, the Presidency of the National Assembly of Bosnia and Herzegovina enacted the Act on Territorial Division of the Federal Bosnia and Herzegovina on Okrugs, Srezs and the Areas of the Local People's Committees. According to this act, Bosnia and Herzegovina was divided into 7 okrugs – Sarajevo, Herzegovina, Travnik, Banja Luka, Doboj and Travnik.

The new Act on Administrative-Territorial Division was enacted in 1949. The People's Republic of Bosnia and Herzegovina was then divided into four oblasts – Sarajevo, Mostar, Banja Luka and Tuzla.

In 1952, the National Assembly of Bosnia and Herzegovina again changed the local administration by enacting the Act on the Division of the Territory of the People's Republic of Bosnia and Herzegovina. The oblasts were abolished, while the country was divided into 66 srezs, 5 cities and 418 municipalities, of which 53 were city municipalities.

In mid 1955, another law, the Act on the Territory of the Srezs and Municipalities in the People's Republic of Bosnia and Herzegovina, was enacted. From then, Bosnia and Herzegovina was divided into 15 srezs – Banja Luka, Bihać, Brčko, Derventa, Doboj, Goražde, Jajce, Livno, Mostar, Prijedor, Sarajevo, Trebinje, Tuzla, Zenica and Zvornik. Each srez had several municipalities. The seat of the named srezs was in the respective municipalities they were named after. This act was changed in 1958, and the srezs of Derventa, Trebinje and Zvornik were abolished. In 1968, the act was changed again, and Bosnia and Herzegovina was divided into 6 srezs – Banja Luka, Bihać, Doboj, Mostar, Sarajevo and Tuzla.

In 1966 the srezs were abolished, and only the municipalities have remained to this day.

== Municipalities in the Federation of Bosnia and Herzegovina ==
- Banovići
- Bosanska Krupa
- Bihać
- Bosanski Petrovac
- Bosansko Grahovo
- Breza
- Bugojno
- Busovača
- Bužim
- Čapljina
- Cazin
- Čelić
- Centar, Sarajevo
- Čitluk
- Drvar
- Doboj East
- Doboj South
- Dobretići
- Domaljevac-Šamac
- Donji Vakuf
- Foča-Ustikolina
- Fojnica
- Glamoč
- Goražde
- Gornji Vakuf-Uskoplje
- Gračanica
- Gradačac
- Grude
- Hadžići
- Ilidža
- Ilijaš
- Jablanica
- Jajce
- Kakanj
- Kalesija
- Kiseljak
- Kladanj
- Ključ
- Konjic
- Kreševo
- Kupres
- Livno
- Ljubuški
- Lukavac
- Maglaj
- Mostar
- Neum
- Novi Grad, Sarajevo
- Novo Sarajevo
- Novi Travnik
- Odžak
- Olovo
- Orašje
- Pale-Prača
- Posušje
- Prozor-Rama
- Ravno
- Sanski Most
- Sapna
- Srebrenik
- Stari Grad, Sarajevo
- Stolac
- Teočak
- Tešanj
- Tomislavgrad
- Travnik
- Trnovo (FBiH)
- Tuzla
- Usora
- Vareš
- Velika Kladuša
- Visoko
- Vitez
- Vogošća
- Zavidovići
- Zenica
- Žepče
- Živinice

== Municipalities of Republika Srpska ==
- Banja Luka
- Berkovići
- Bijeljina
- Bileća
- Kostajnica
- Brod
- Bratunac
- Čajniče
- Čelinac
- Derventa
- Doboj
- Donji Žabar
- Foča
- Gacko
- Gradiška
- Han Pijesak
- Istočni Drvar
- Istočna Ilidža
- Istočni Mostar
- Istočni Stari Grad
- Istočno Novo Sarajevo
- Jezero
- Kalinovik
- Kneževo
- Kozarska Dubica
- Kotor Varoš
- Krupa na Uni
- Kupres
- Laktaši
- Ljubinje
- Lopare
- Milići
- Modriča
- Mrkonjić Grad
- Nevesinje
- Novi Grad
- Novo Goražde
- Osmaci
- Oštra Luka
- Pale
- Pelagićevo
- Petrovac
- Petrovo
- Prijedor
- Prnjavor
- Ribnik
- Rogatica
- Rudo
- Šamac
- Šekovići
- Šipovo
- Sokolac
- Srbac
- Srebrenica
- Stanari
- Teslić
- Trebinje
- Trnovo (RS)
- Ugljevik
- Višegrad
- Vlasenica
- Vukosavlje
- Zvornik

== See also ==
- List of populated places in Bosnia and Herzegovina
- List of settlements in the Federation of Bosnia and Herzegovina
- List of cities in Bosnia and Herzegovina

== Bibliography ==
=== Books ===
- Zovko, Ljubomir (2007). Studije iz pravne povijesti Bosne i Hercegovine 1878.-1941 [The studies of legal history of Bosnia and Herzegovina 1878-1941] (in Croatian). Mostar: Faculty of Law, University of Mostar. ISBN 9789958927126.

=== Journals ===
- Velagić, Adnan (2013). "Administrativno-teritorijalne promjene u Hercegovini od 1945. do 1996. godine" [The administrative-territorial changes in Herzegovina from 1945 to 1990]. Prilozi (in Bosnian). 42: 189–205.
