= Administrative divisions of the Principality of Serbia =

The administrative divisions of the Principality of Serbia (Serbian: Административна подела Кнежевине Србије), which existed from 1815 to 1882, changed during the course of history.

== 1815–1819 ==
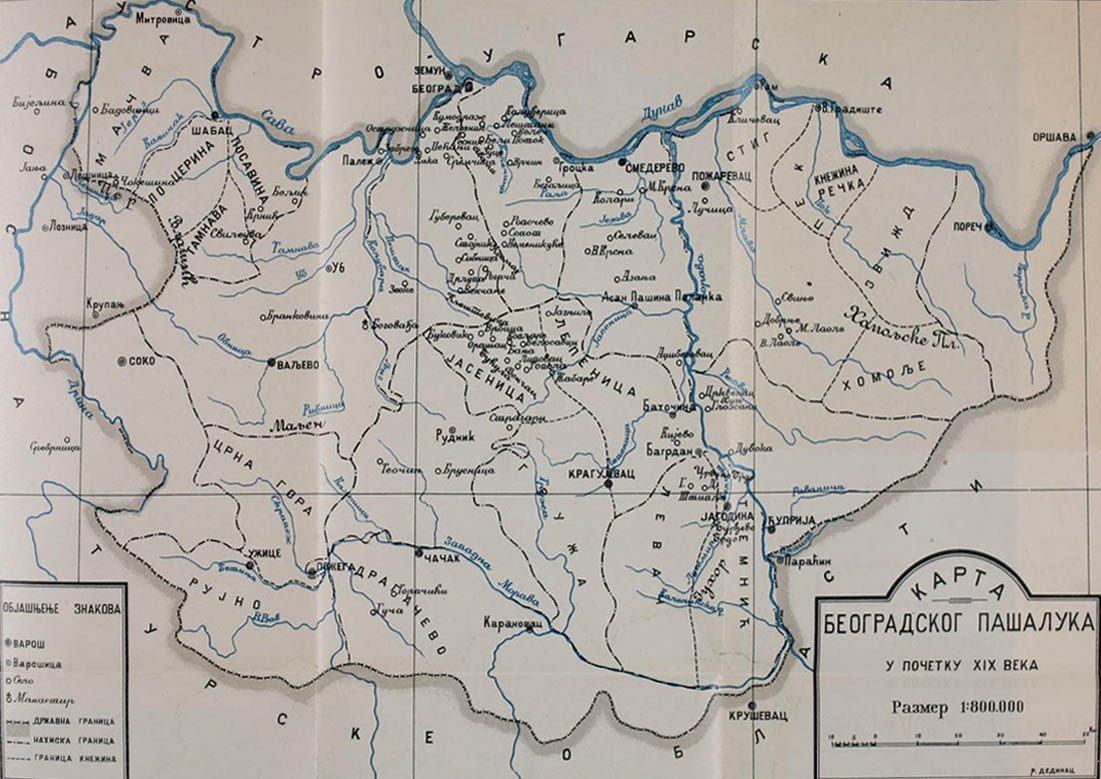
Map of the Belgrade Pashalik, including nahiyas and knežine.

In 1815, Serbia included all of the Belgrade Pashalik (12 nahije (sing. nahija, from Ottoman nahiye) and also the Poreč region of the Vidin Pashalik, with Poreč being returned to Ottoman administration in early 1816.

Nahija	Villages	Seat
Belgrade (Beogradska nahija)	128	Belgrade
Valjevo (Valjevska nahija)	193	Valjevo
Jagodina (Jagodinska nahija)	140	Jagodina
Kragujevac (Kragujevačka nahija)	160	Kragujevac
Požarevac (Požarevačka nahija)	194	Požarevac
Požega (Požeška nahija)	104	Požega
Rudnik (Rudnička nahija)	101	Rudnik
Smederevo (Smederevska nahija)	51	Smederevo
Soko (Sokolska nahija)	70	
Užice (Užička nahija)	123	Užice
Ćuprija (Ćuprijska nahija)	72	Ćuprija
Šabac (Šabačka nahija)	105	Šabac
Poreč	20	Poreč

== 1819–1833 ==
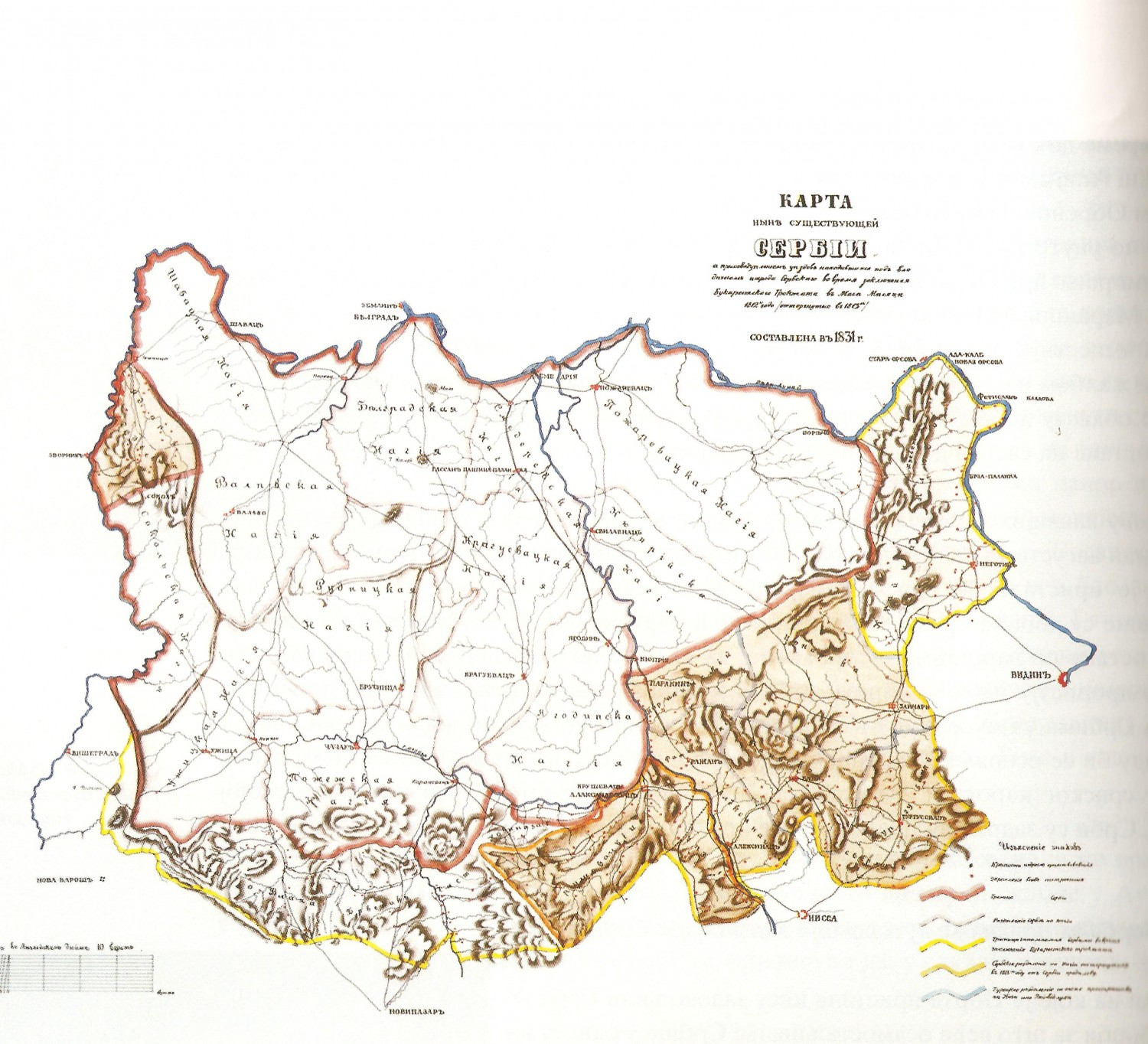
Map of Serbia in 1831.

In 1819, Serbia was organized into 12 nahije (sing. nahija, from Ottoman nahiye), 45 knežine (sing. knežina), 1,396 villages and towns.

Nahija	knežine	Villages	Seat
Šabac (Šabačka nahija)	4	104	Šabac
Valjevo (Valjevska nahija)	3	189	Valjevo
Soko (Sokolska nahija)	2	46	
Užice (Užička nahija)	2	120	Užice
Požega (Požeška nahija)	8	105	Požega
Rudnik (Rudnička nahija)	5	111	Rudnik
Kragujevac (Kragujevačka nahija)	3	168	Kragujevac
Jagodina (Jagodinska nahija)	2	145	Jagodina
Ćuprija (Ćuprijska nahija)	2	72	Ćuprija
Požarevac (Požarevačka nahija)	7	194	Požarevac
Smederevo (Smederevska nahija)	2	125	Smederevo
Belgrade (Beogradska nahija)	5	125	Belgrade

== 1833–1836 ==
In 1833, six nahiye were ceded to Serbia with the "Third Hatišerif", an edict (hatt-i sharif) issued by Sultan Mahmud II (r. 1808–1839). In 1834, the Parliament decided that Serbia be divided on five governorships (serdarstvo) and 19 districts (okružije or okrug), thereby ending the Ottoman nomenclature. The six ceded nahiyas (part of Revolutionary Serbia before 1813), Krajina, Crna Reka, Paraćin, Kruševac, Stari Vlah, Jadar and Rađevina, were organized into the present governorships. The five governorships were Raška (Raško serdarstvo, seat in Čačak), Rasina (Rasinsko serdarstvo, seat in Jagodina), Podunavlje (Podunavsko serdarstvo, seat in Belgrade), Mačva (Mačvansko serdarstvo, seat in Šabac), and Timok (Timočko serdarstvo, seat in Negotin). In the summer of 1834 there were 15 districts and 61 captaincies (kapetanije), the latter renamed srezovi (sing. srez) in 1835.

According to the 1834 census, there were the following districts:

District	Captaincies	Villages	Seat
Krajina (Okružije Krajinsko)	?	?	Negotin
Crna Reka (Okružije Crnorečko)	?	?	Zaječar
Banja (Okružije Banjsko)	?	?	
Ćuprija (Okružije Ćuprijsko)	?	?	Ćuprija
Požarevac (Okružije Požarevačko)	?	?	Požarevac
Kruševac (Okružije Kruševačko)	?	?	Kruševac
Jagodina (Okružije Jagodinsko)	?	?	Jagodina
Smederevo (Okružije Smederevsko)	?	?	Smederevo
Belgrade (Okružije Beogradsko)	?	?	Belgrade
Kragujevac (Okružije Kragujevačko)	?	?	Kragujevac
Rudnik (Okružije Rudničko)	?	?	Rudnik
Užice (Okružije Užičko)	?	?	Užice
Podrinje (Okružije Podrinsko)	?	?	Loznica
Valjevo (Okružije Valjevsko)	?	?	Valjevo
Šabac (Okružije Šabačko)	?	?	Šabac

== 1836–1878 ==
In 1836, the Čačak district was separated from the Rudnik district, while the Banja district was divided into the Aleksinac and Gurgusovac districts. The 17 districts were used until 1878. Gurgusovac was renamed Knjaževac in 1859.

In 1866, there were statistical studies done on the Principality of Serbia, one by statistician Vladimir Jakšić (1824–1899) in Glasnik, and the other done in Almanach de Gotha. Serbia had a total of 1,216,346 inhabitants in 1866, according to M. Milićević (1876).

District	Srezovi	Settlements	Seat	Inhabitants
Belgrade (Beogradski okrug)	5	123	Belgrade	63,880
Smederevo (Smederevski okrug)	4	55	Smederevo	59,980
Jagodina (Jagodinski okrug)	4	145	Jagodina	62,179
Kragujevac (Kragujevački okrug)	5	177	Kragujevac	98,141
Rudnik (Rudnički okrug)	4	120	Rudnik	47,565
Valjevo (Valjevski okrug)	6	213	Valjevo	83,483
Šabac (Šabački okrug)	4	113	Šabac	73,622
Podrinje (Podrinski okrug)	4	115	Loznica	48,827
Užice (Užički okrug)	7	405	Užice	104,377
Čačak (Čačanski okrug)	5	243	Čačak	58,037
Kruševac (Kruševački okrug)	5	285	Kruševac	67,756
Aleksinac (Aleksinački okrug)	4	119	Aleksinac	48,136
Knjaževac (Kneževački okrug)	4	112	Knjaževac	55,079
Crna Reka (Crnorečki okrug)	3	45	Zaječar	53,284
Krajina (Krajinski okrug)	6	80	Negotin	70,324
Požarevac (Požarevački okrug)	8	183	Požarevac	140,790
Ćuprija (Ćuprijski okrug)	4	95	Ćuprija	55,888

== See also ==
- Administrative divisions of modern Serbia

== Sources ==
- Milićević, Milan Đ. (1876). Кнежевина Србија: географија, орографија, хидрографија, топографија, аркеологија, историја, етнографија, статистика, просвета, култура, управа [Principality of Serbia]. U državnoj štampariji – via Google Books.
- Petrović, Vukašin J.; Petrović, Nikola K. (1882). "Државна управа". Грађа за Историју Краљевине Србије, време прве владе Кнеза Милоша Обреновића: књига прва, од 1815 до 1821 године. pp. 153-.
- Завод за статистику (May 1955), Административно-територијалне промене у НР Србији 1834-1954 (PDF), Народна Република Србија: завод за статистику
