= Syrmia Oblast =

Syrmia Oblast Сремска област Sremska oblast Srijemska oblast
- Oblast of the Kingdom of Serbs, Croats and Slovenes
- 1922–1929
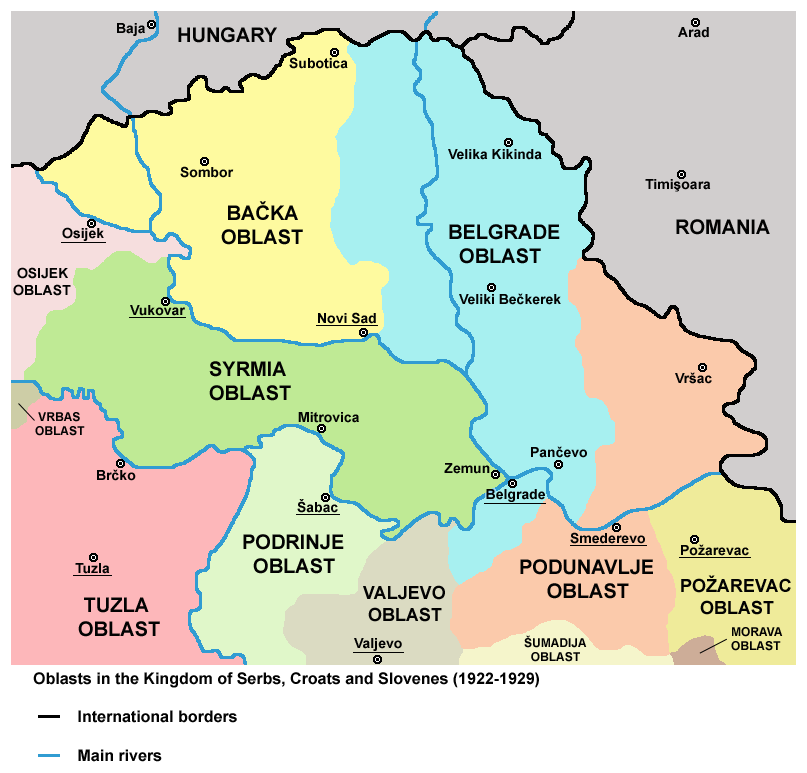
- Syrmia Oblast and surrounding areas

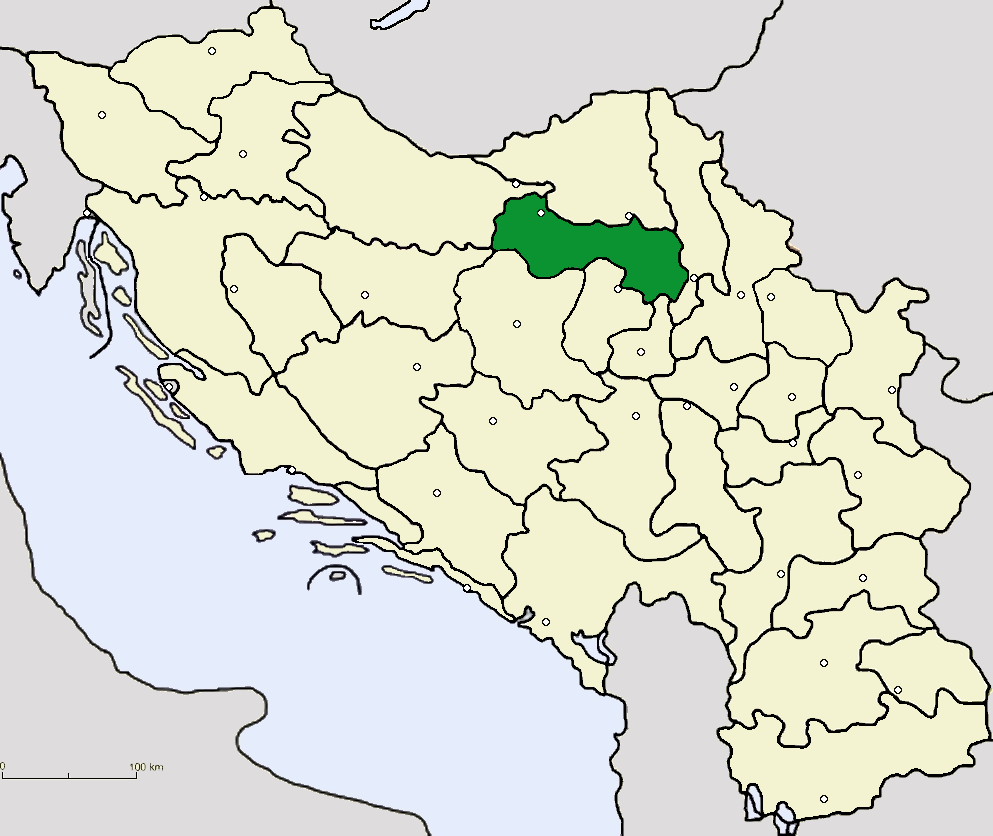
- Capital: Vukovar
- History
  - Established: 1922
  - Disestablished: 1929
Preceded by
| Syrmia County |
Succeeded by
| Danube Banovina |
| Drina Banovina |
| Belgrade City Administration |
- Today part of: Serbia, Croatia

Syrmia Oblast (Serbian: Sremska oblast or Сремска област; Croatian: Srijemska oblast) was one of the oblasts of the Kingdom of Serbs, Croats and Slovenes from 1922 to 1929. Its administrative center was Vukovar.

== History ==
The Kingdom of Serbs, Croats and Slovenes was formed in 1918 and was initially divided into counties and districts (this division was inherited from previous state administrations). In 1922, new administrative units known as oblasts (Serbo-Croatian: oblasti / области) were introduced and the whole country was divided into 33 oblasts. Before 1922, the territory of the Syrmia Oblast was part of the Syrmia County.

In 1929, 33 oblasts were administratively replaced with 9 banovinas and one district, and the territory of the Syrmia Oblast was divided between the Danube Banovina, the Drina Banovina, and the Belgrade City Administration.

== Geography ==
The Syrmia Oblast included the entire region of Syrmia. It shared borders with the Bačka Oblast in the north, the Belgrade Oblast in the east, the Valjevo Oblast, the Podrinje Oblast and the Tuzla Oblast in the south, the Vrbas Oblast in the southwest, and the Osijek Oblast in the west.

== Demographics ==
According to the 1921 census, all districts (Serbo-Croatian: srezovi / срезови) and administrative cities in the Syrmia Oblast had a dominant Serbo-Croatian-speaking population. By religion, 7 eastern and central districts (Ilok, Irig, Ruma, Mitrovica, Stara Pazova, Šid, Zemun) were mainly Orthodox, while 3 western districts (Vukovar, Vinkovci, Županja) were mainly Catholic.

== Administrative units ==
Oblast included following districts:

- Ilok
- Irig
- Ruma
- Mitrovica
- Stara Pazova
- Šid
- Vinkovci
- Vukovar
- Zemun
- Županja

Besides these districts, several cities in the oblast had a separate status:

- Mitrovica
- Petrovaradin
- Sremski Karlovci
- Zemun

== Cities and towns ==
The main cities and towns in the district were:

- Inđija
- Ruma
- Mitrovica
- Vinkovci
- Vukovar
- Zemun

Most of the mentioned cities and towns are nowadays in Serbia, while the towns of Vinkovci and Vukovar are nowadays in Croatia.

== See also ==
- Syrmia
- Kingdom of Serbs, Croats and Slovenes
