= Bačka Oblast =

Former oblast of Yugoslavia

Bačka Oblast Бачка област Bačka oblast
- Oblast of the Kingdom of Serbs, Croats and Slovenes
- 1922–1929
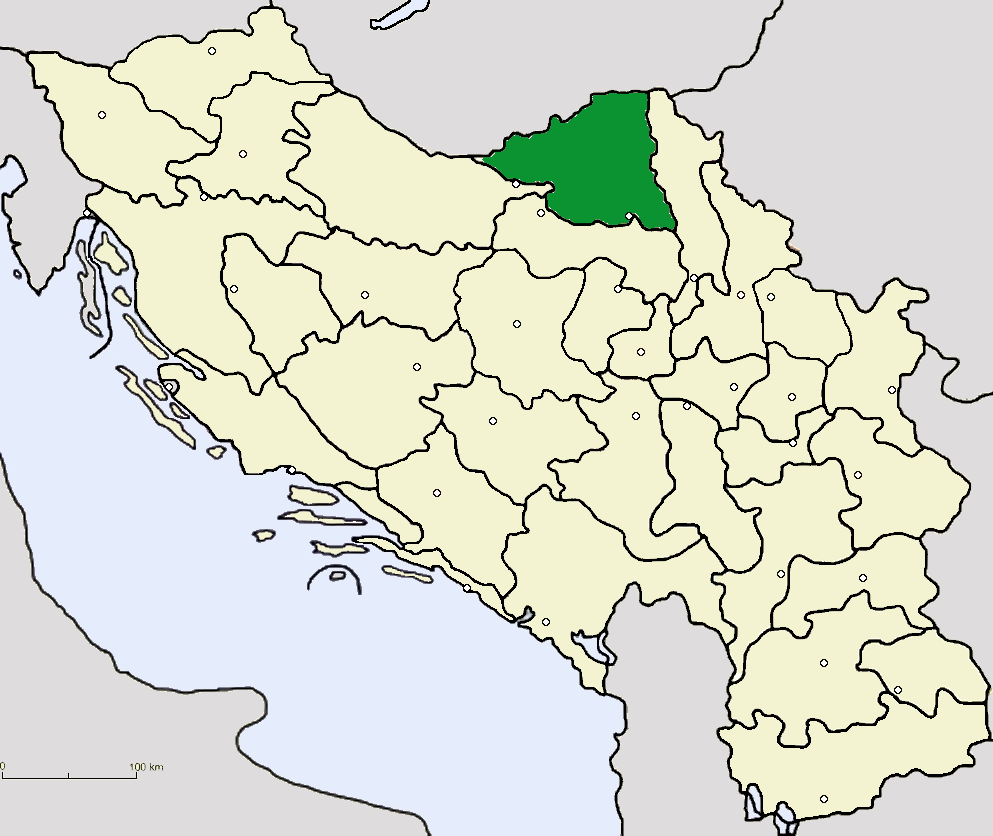
- Bačka Oblast within the Kingdom of Yugoslavia
- Capital: Novi Sad
- Area
  - Coordinates: 45.5°N 19.4°E
- History
  - Established: 1922
  - Disestablished: 1929
Preceded by	Succeeded by
Novi Sad County	Danube Banovina
- Today part of: Serbia, Croatia

Bačka Oblast (Serbo-Croatian: Bačka oblast or Бачка област) was one of the oblasts of the Kingdom of Serbs, Croats and Slovenes from 1922 to 1929. Its administrative center was Novi Sad.

== History ==
The Kingdom of Serbs, Croats and Slovenes was formed in 1918 and was initially divided into counties and districts (this division was inherited from previous state administrations). In 1922, new administrative units known as oblasts (Serbo-Croatian: oblasti / области) were introduced and the whole country was divided into 33 oblasts. Before 1922, the territory of the Bačka Oblast was part of the Novi Sad County.

In 1929, 33 oblasts were administratively replaced with 9 banovinas and one district, and the territory of the Bačka Oblast was administratively included into the Danube Banovina.

== Geography ==
The Bačka Oblast included western parts of Bačka and the region of Baranja. It shared borders with the Belgrade Oblast in the east, the Syrmia Oblast in the south, the Osijek Oblast in the west, and Hungary in the northwest.

== Demographics ==
According to the 1921 census, the oblast had a linguistically heterogeneous population: speakers of Serbo-Croatian were dominant in the cities of Novi Sad, Sombor and Subotica; speakers of German were dominant in the districts of Apatin, Darda, Kula, Odžaci, Sombor and Stara Palanka; speakers of Hungarian were dominant in the districts of Topola and Batina; while speakers of Slovak were dominant in the district of Novi Sad.

== Administrative units ==
The oblast included following districts:

- Apatin
- Batina
- Darda
- Odžaci
- Kula
- Novi Sad
- Sombor
- Stara Palanka
- Topola

Besides these districts, several cities in the oblast had a separate status:

- Novi Sad
- Sombor
- Subotica

== Cities and towns ==
Main cities and towns in the district were:

- Apatin
- Kula
- Novi Sad
- Sombor
- Stara Palanka
- Subotica
- Temerin
- Vrbas

All the mentioned cities and towns are nowadays in Serbia.

== See also ==
- Bačka
- Kingdom of Serbs, Croats and Slovenes
