= Drina Banovina =

Province of Yugoslavia

Coordinates: 43.8667°N 18.4167°E

Drina Banovina Drinska banovina Дринска бановина
- Banovina of the Kingdom of Yugoslavia
- 1929–1941
- Flag Coat of arms

- Drina Banovina in 1931
- Capital: Sarajevo
- Population
- 1,534,739 (1,931)
- Government
  - Type: Devolved autonomous banate
- Monarch
  - 1929–1934: Alexander I
  - 1934–1941: Peter II
- History
  - Established: 3 October 1929
  - 1931 Yugoslav Constitution: 3 September 1931
  - Invasion of Yugoslavia: 6–18 April 1941
Succeeded by
Banovina of Croatia
Socialist Republic of Bosnia and Herzegovina
Socialist Republic of Serbia
- Today part of: Bosnia and Herzegovina; Serbia

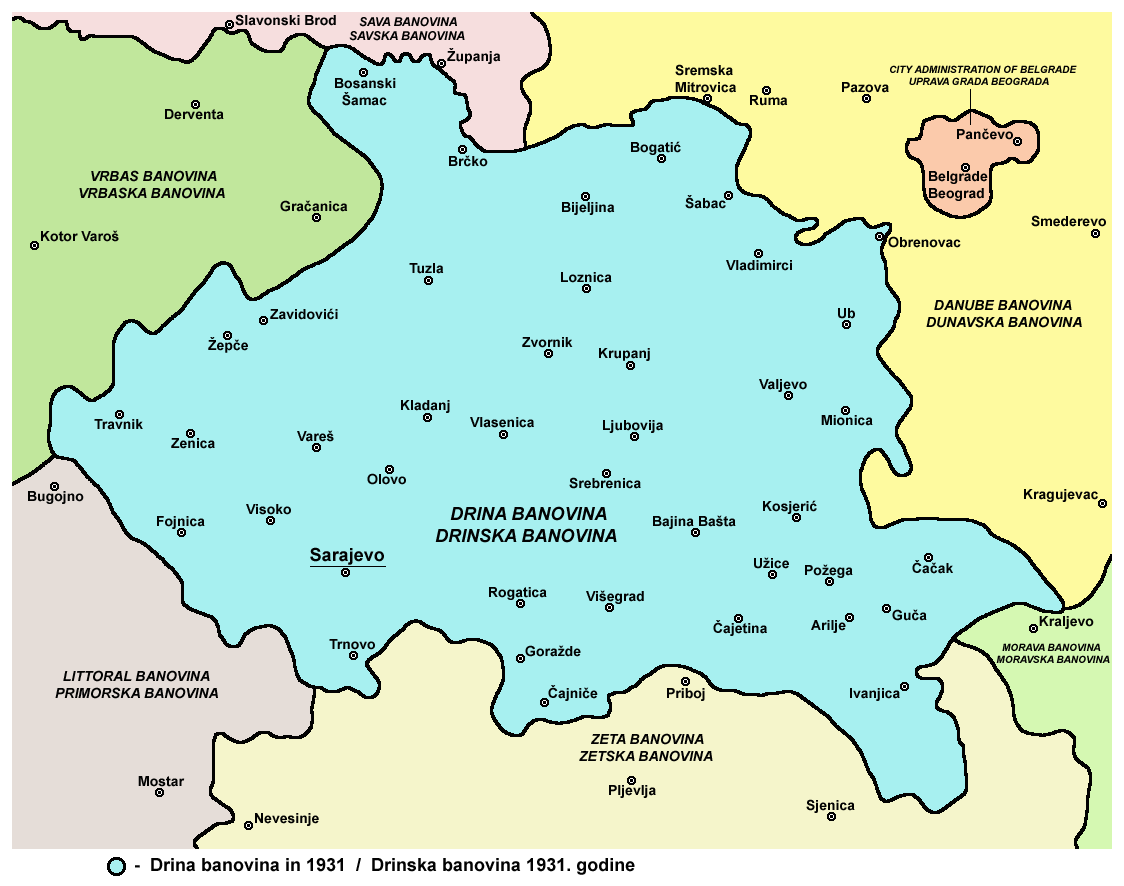
Drina Banovina in 1931

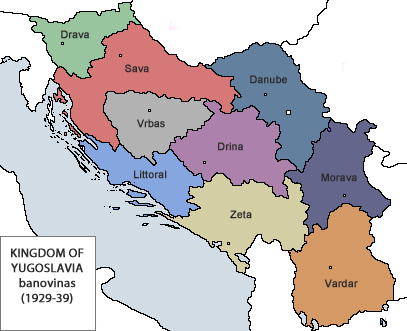
Map of Yugoslav banovinas in 1929 (The Drina Banovina is #5)

The Drina Banovina or Drina Banate (Serbo-Croatian: Drinska banovina, Дринска бановина) was a province (banovina) of the Kingdom of Yugoslavia between 1929 and 1941. Its capital was Sarajevo and it included portions of present-day Bosnia and Herzegovina and Serbia. It was named after the Drina River and, like all Yugoslav banovinas, was intentionally not based on ethnic boundaries. As a result of the creation of the Banovina of Croatia in 1939, its territory was reduced considerably.

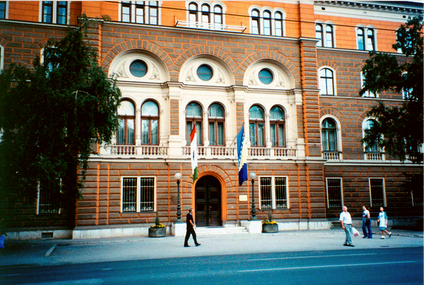
The administrative building of Banovina. Today houses the Presidency of BiH

== Borders ==
According to the 1931 Constitution of the Kingdom of Yugoslavia,

The Drina Banovina is bounded on the west, as far as the Sava, by the boundaries ... of the Littoral and Vrbas Banovinas, then on the north by the river Sava to where it is joined by the Kolubara. From this confluence and up to the eastern boundary of the Maritime Banovina (eastern boundary of the district of Konjic, hill 2058 in the Treskavica mountains) the boundary of the Drina Banovina follows the eastern boundaries of the districts of Posava (capital, Obrenovac), Tamnava, Kolubara (capital, Mionica) and Požega, including the district of Ljubić. It then follows the eastern boundaries of the districts of Trnava and Dragačevo, then the southern and western boundaries of the district of Moravica, continuing along the southern boundaries of the districts of Arilje, Zlatibor, Višegrad, Čajniče, Rogatica, and Sarajevo.

== Demographics ==
According to the Yugoslav census of 1931, the Drina banovina had a population of 1,534,739 and a population density of 55.1 people per square kilometre.

The census also says that Drina banovina had a high agricultural population, with an agricultural population of 91.3 people per square kilometre. This was the second highest agricultural population density in the country behind only Vrbas Banovina (98.8). Overall, Drina banovina had 1,383,686 hectares of cultivated land.

== History ==
In 1941, the World War II Axis powers occupied the Drina Banovina and the province was abolished and divided between the Independent State of Croatia and German-occupied Serbia. Following World War II, the region was divided between Bosnia and Herzegovina and Serbia within a federal Socialist Yugoslavia.

== See also ==
- Podrinje
- Bosnian Podrinje Canton
- Šumadija and Western Serbia
- Administrative divisions of Yugoslavia
