= Maribor Oblast =

Oblast of Kingdom of Serbs, Croats and Slovenes

Maribor Oblast Mariborska Oblast
- Oblast of the Kingdom of Serbs, Croats and Slovenes
- 1922–1929
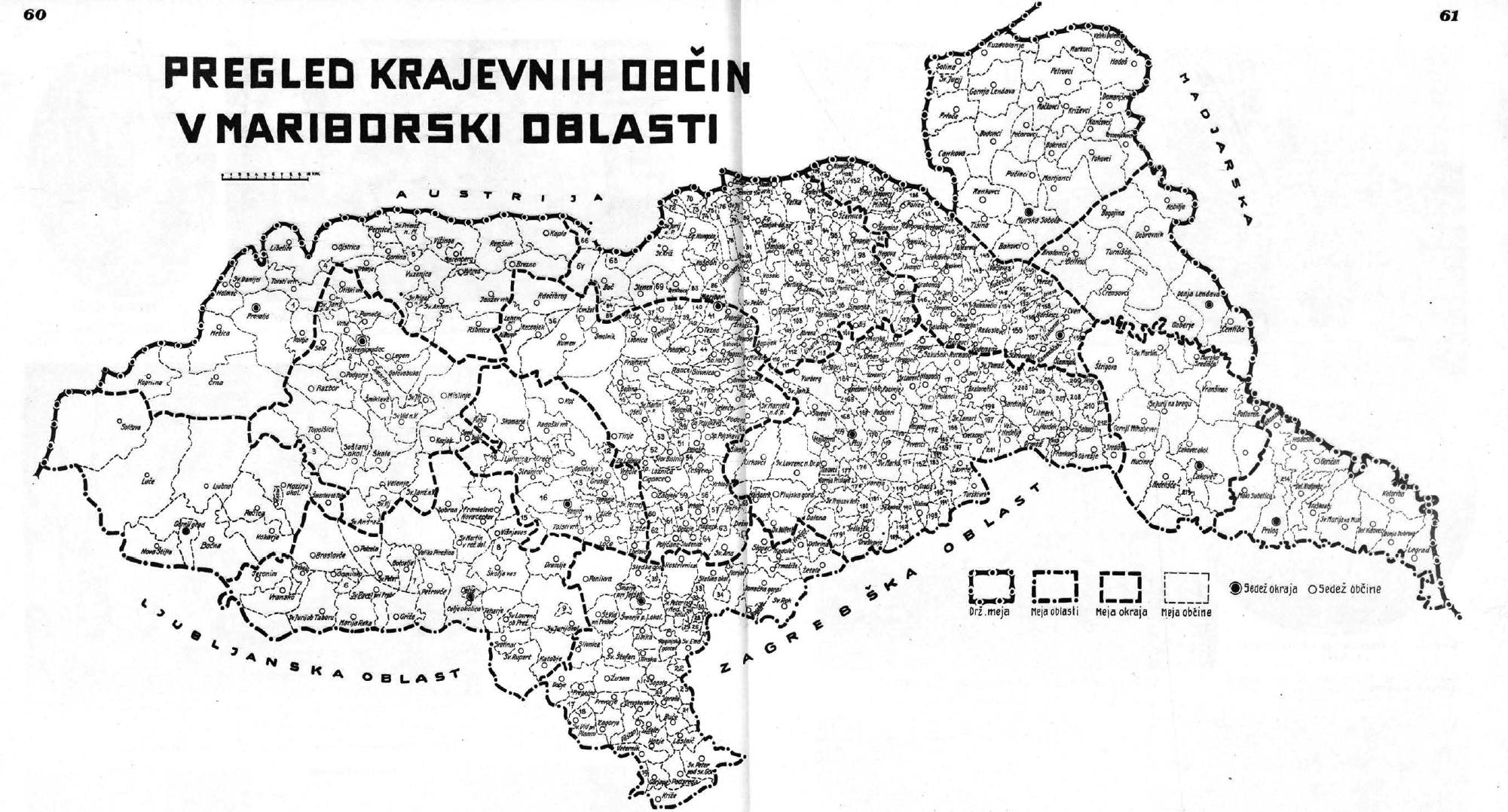
- Maribor Oblast map

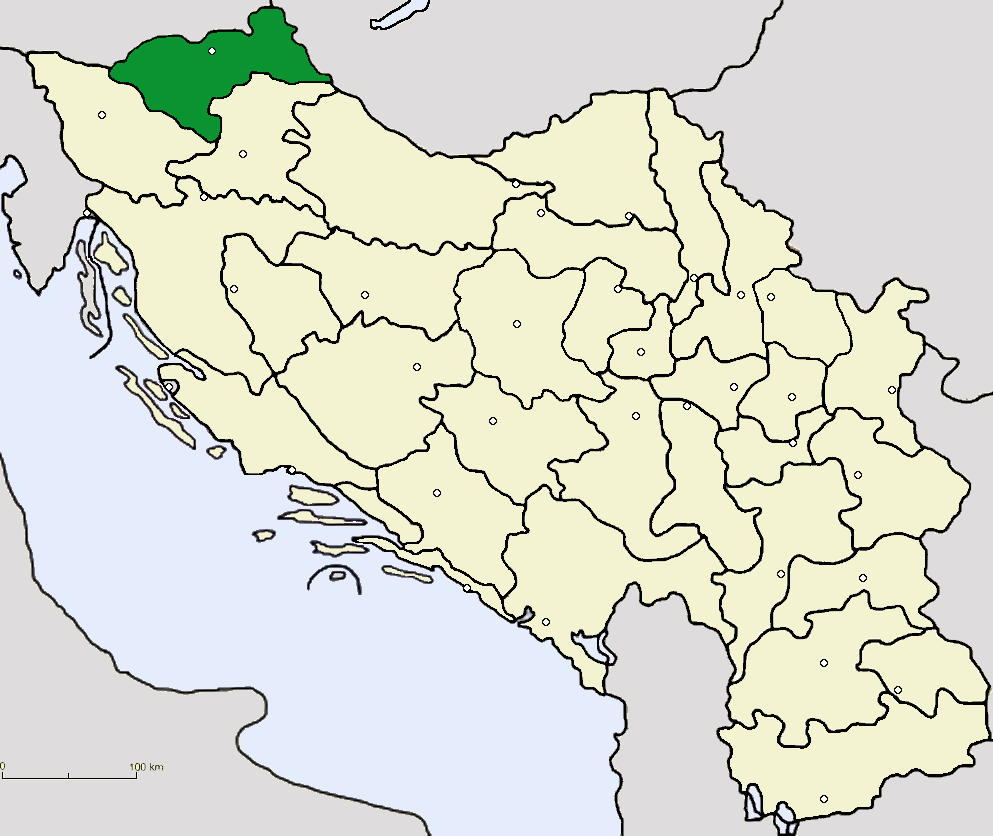
- Capital: Maribor
- Area
  - 1921: 7,569 km^{2} (2,922 sq mi)
- Population
  - 1921: 624,121
- History
  - Established: 1922
  - Disestablished: 1929
Preceded by	Succeeded by
Province of Slovenia; Province of Croatia and Slavonia	Drava Banovina; Sava Banovina
- Today part of: Slovenia; Croatia

Maribor Oblast (Slovene: Mariborska oblast) was one of the oblasts of the Kingdom of Serbs, Croats and Slovenes from 1922 to 1929. Its capital was Maribor.

== History ==
The Kingdom of Serbs, Croats and Slovenes was formed in 1918 and was initially divided into provinces (this division was inherited from previous state administrations). In 1922, new administrative units known as oblasts (Slovene: oblasti) were introduced and the whole country was divided into 33 oblasts. Before 1922, the territory of the Maribor Oblast was part of the Province of Slovenia and the Province of Croatia and Slavonia.

== Geography ==
The Maribor Oblast was composed of the traditional regions of Lower Styria, Slovene Carinthia, Prekmurje, which were predominantly Slovene-speaking, and Međimurje, which was predominantly Croatian-speaking. The Oblast bordered Austria to the north, Hungary to the east, Ljubljana Oblast to the west and Zagreb Oblast to the south.

== Administrative units ==
The oblast included the following districts:

- Maribor Right Embankment
- Maribor Left Embankment
- Celje
- Čakovec
- Dolnja Lendava
- Dravograd
- Gornji Grad
- Ljutomer
- Murska Sobota
- Prelog
- Ptuj
- Slovenj Gradec
- Slovenske Konjice
- Šmarje pri Jelšah

== See also ==
- Kingdom of Serbs, Croats and Slovenes
- Maribor
