= Belgrade Oblast =

Belgrade Oblast Београдска област Beogradska oblast
- Oblast of the Kingdom of Serbs, Croats and Slovenes
- 1922–1929
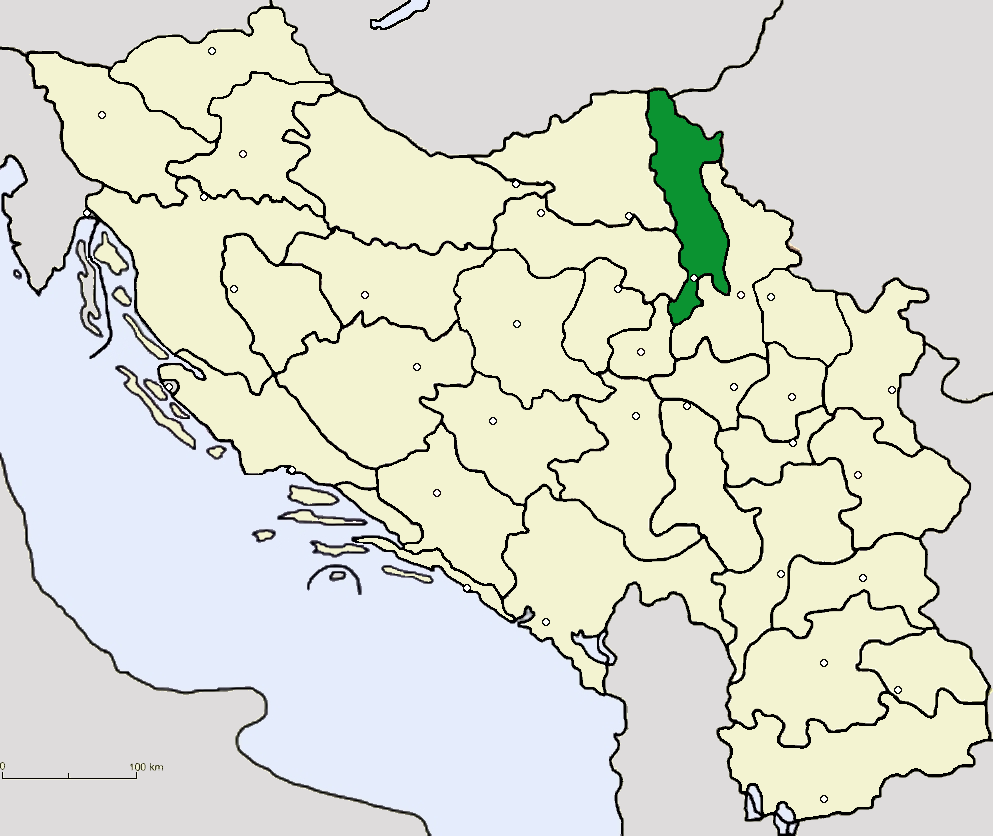
- Belgrade Oblast within the Kingdom of Yugoslavia
- Capital: Belgrade
- History
  - Established: 1922
  - Disestablished: 1929
Preceded by
| Belgrade District |
| Novi Sad District |
| Veliki Bečkerek District |
Succeeded by
| Belgrade City Administration (1929–41) |
| Danube Banovina |
- Today part of: Serbia, Romania

Belgrade Oblast (Serbo-Croatian: Београдска област, Beogradska oblast) was one of the oblasts of the Kingdom of Serbs, Croats and Slovenes from 1922 to 1929. Its administrative center was Belgrade.

== History ==
The Kingdom of Serbs, Croats and Slovenes was formed in 1918 and was initially divided into counties and districts (this division was inherited from previous state administrations). In 1922, new administrative units known as oblasts (Serbo-Croatian: oblasti / области) were introduced and the whole country was divided into 33 oblasts. Before 1922, the territory of the Belgrade Oblast was part of the Belgrade, Novi Sad, and Veliki Bečkerek districts.

In 1924, as a result of an adjustment of the border between the Kingdom of Serbs, Croats and Slovenes and Romania, the town of Žombolj (Jimbolia) was transferred to Romania.

In 1929, 33 oblasts were administratively replaced with 9 banovinas and one district, and the territory of the Belgrade Oblast was administratively divided between the Belgrade City Administration and the Danube Banovina.

== Geography ==
The Belgrade Oblast included a small northern part of Šumadija near Belgrade, western parts of Banat and eastern parts of Bačka. It shared borders with the Bačka Oblast and Syrmia Oblast in the west, the Valjevo Oblast in the southwest, the Podunavlje Oblast in the southeast, Romania in the northeast and Hungary in the north.

== Demographics ==
According to the 1921 census, the oblast had a linguistically heterogeneous population: speakers of Serbo-Croatian were dominant in the cities of Belgrade, Pančevo, Veliki Bečkerek and Velika Kikinda, as well as in the districts of Belgrade, Umka, Kovačica, Veliki Bečkerek, Turski Bečej, Velika Kikinda, Titel and Žabalj; speakers of German were dominant in the district of Pančevo; speakers of Romanian were dominant in the district of Žombolj; while speakers of Hungarian were dominant in the city of Senta and in the districts of Senta, Stari Bečej and Turska Kanjiža.

== Administrative units ==
The oblast included the following districts:

- Belgrade
- Kovačica
- Pančevo
- Senta
- Stari Bečej
- Titel
- Turska Kanjiža
- Turski Bečej
- Umka
- Velika Kikinda
- Veliki Bečkerek
- Žabalj
- Žombolj

Besides these districts, several cities in the oblast had a separate status:

- Belgrade
- Pančevo
- Senta
- Velika Kikinda
- Veliki Bečkerek

== Cities and towns ==
The main cities and towns in the oblast were:

- Belgrade
- Pančevo
- Senta
- Stari Bečej
- Velika Kikinda
- Veliki Bečkerek

All the mentioned cities and towns are nowadays in Serbia.

== See also ==
- Belgrade
- Kingdom of Serbs, Croats and Slovenes
