= Srez =

Second-level administrative unit in Kingdom of Serbia and Kingdom of Yugoslavia

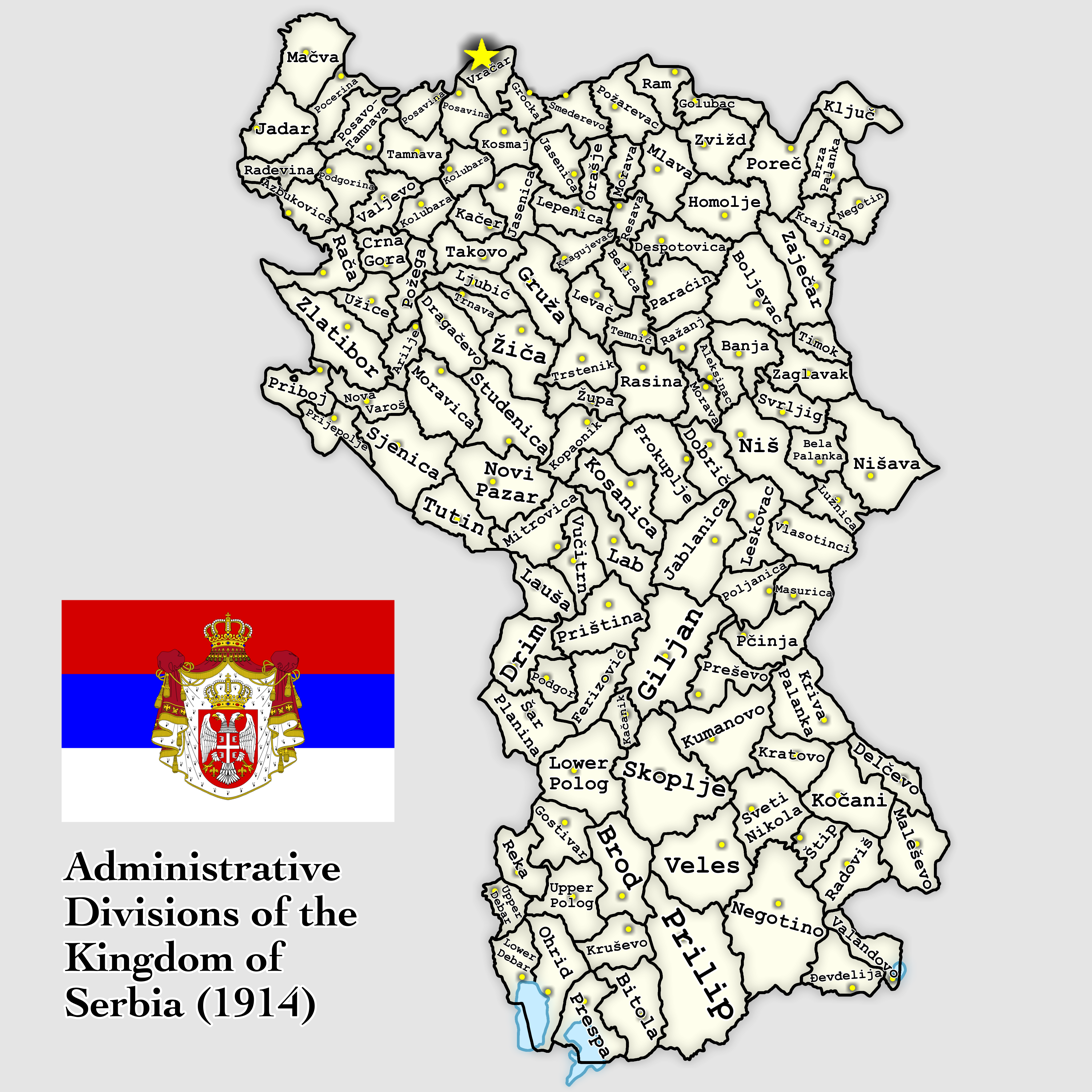
Administrative division of the Kingdom of Serbia, at the srez level (1914)

The srez (Serbian Cyrillic: срез; pl. srezovi / срезови) was a second-level administrative unit in the Principality of Serbia, Kingdom of Serbia and Yugoslavia. It was a district that included several town- or village municipalities. It was introduced in Serbia in 1834, and abolished in 1963–1367 in SFR Yugoslavia. The unit is no longer used, although the katastarski srez is used in cadastral classification of property.

== History ==
The srez was noted as a second-level administrative unit in the 1903 Constitution of Serbia and the 1921 Constitution of Yugoslavia, below the okrug and above the opština.

== See also ==
- Administrative divisions of Serbia
- Administrative divisions of Yugoslavia
- Uyezd, historical Russian equivalent

== Sources ==
- Sofija Božić (1 April 2014). Istorija i geografija: susreti i prožimanja: History and geography: meetings and permeations. Институт за новију историју Србије,Географски институт "Јован Цвијић" САНУ, Институт за славистку Ран. pp. 257–. ISBN 978-86-7005-125-6.
- Слободан Зечевић. Гласник Етнографског музеја у Београду књ. 30: Bulletin du Musée Ethnographique de Belgrade. Etnografski muzej u Beogradu. pp. 132–. GGKEY:U1JY3YFUSNS.
