= Zagreb Oblast =

Zagreb Oblast Zagrebačka oblast
- Oblast of Kingdom of Serbs, Croats and Slovenes
- 1922–1929
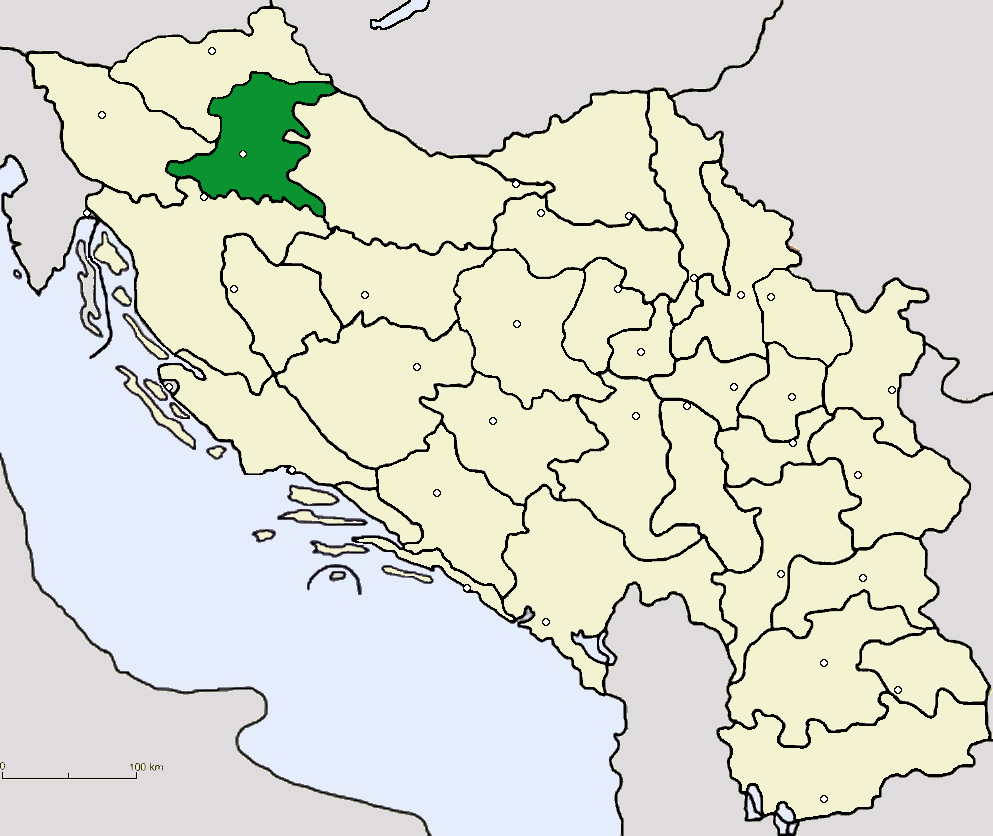
- Zagreb Oblast within the Kingdom of Yugoslavia
- Capital: Zagreb
- History
  - Vidovdan Constitution: 1922
  - January 6 Dictatorship: 1929
Preceded by	Succeeded by
Zagreb County (former); Varaždin County (former)	Sava Banovina
- Today part of: Croatia

The Zagreb Oblast (Croatian: Zagrebačka oblast) was an administrative division of the Kingdom of Serbs, Croats and Slovenes. It existed from 1922 to 1929 and its capital was in the city of Zagreb.

== Oblast elections ==
Elections in oblasts were held once on January 23, 1927.

Parties and coalitions	Total deputies	From Zagreb	Percentage of the Assembly
Croatian Peasant Party	70	4	87.5%
Independent Democratic Party	3	1	3.75%
Croatian Federalist Peasant Party	3	3	3.75%
Independent Workers' Party	2	2	2.5%
Croatian Party of Rights	1	1	1.25%
Independent	1	-	1.25%
Total	80	11	100.0%

== See also ==
- Zagreb County
