= Travnik Oblast =

Former oblast of Yugoslavia

Travnik Oblast Травник област
- Oblast of the Kingdom of Serbs, Croats and Slovenes
- 1922–1929
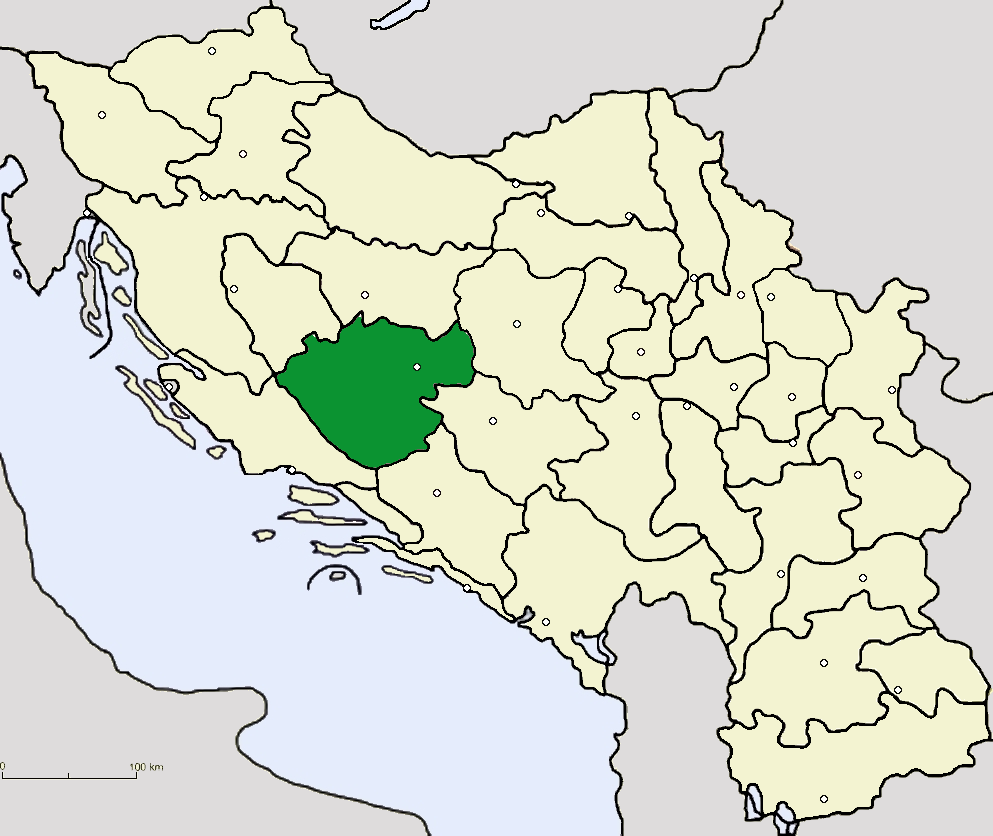
- Travnik Oblast and surrounding areas
- Capital: Travnik
- Area
  - Coordinates: 44°13′35″N 17°39′35″E
- History
  - Established: 1922
  - Disestablished: 1929
Preceded by	Succeeded by
District of Travnik	Vrbas Banovina; Littoral Banovina
- Today part of: Bosnia and Herzegovina

Travnik Oblast (Serbo-Croatian: Травник област, romanized: Travnik Oblast) was one of the oblasts of the Kingdom of Serbs, Croats and Slovenes from 1922 to 1929. Its administrative center was Travnik.

== History ==
The Kingdom of Serbs, Croats and Slovenes was formed in 1918 and was initially divided into counties and districts (this division was inherited from previous state administrations). In 1922, new administrative units known as oblasts (Serbo-Croatian: oblasti / области) were introduced and the whole country was divided into 33 oblasts. Before 1922, the territory of the Travnik Oblast was part of the Travnik District.

In 1929, the 33 oblasts were administratively replaced with 9 banovinas and one district, and the territory of the Travnik Oblast was administratively split between the Vrbas Banovina and the Littoral Banovina.

== Geography ==
The Travnik Oblast was mostly congruent with the region of Tropolje. It shared borders with the Sarajevo Oblast in the west, Split Oblast in the east, the Mostar Oblast in the south, the Bihać and Vrbas Oblasts in the north, the Tuzla Oblast in the northeast, and the Primorje-Krajina Oblast in the northwest.

== Demographics ==
According to the 1921 census, the Travnik Oblast was linguistically dominated by speakers of Serbo-Croatian.

== Cities and towns ==
The main cities and towns located within the oblast were:

- Travnik
- Zenica
- Žepče
- Bugojno
- Prozor
- Županjac
- Livno
- Glamoč
- Jajce

All the mentioned cities and towns are now part of Bosnia and Herzegovina.

== See also ==
- Travnik
- Kingdom of Serbs, Croats and Slovenes
