= Vrbas Oblast =

Former oblast of Yugoslavia

Vrbas Oblast Врбас област
- Oblast of the Kingdom of Serbs, Croats and Slovenes
- 1922–1929
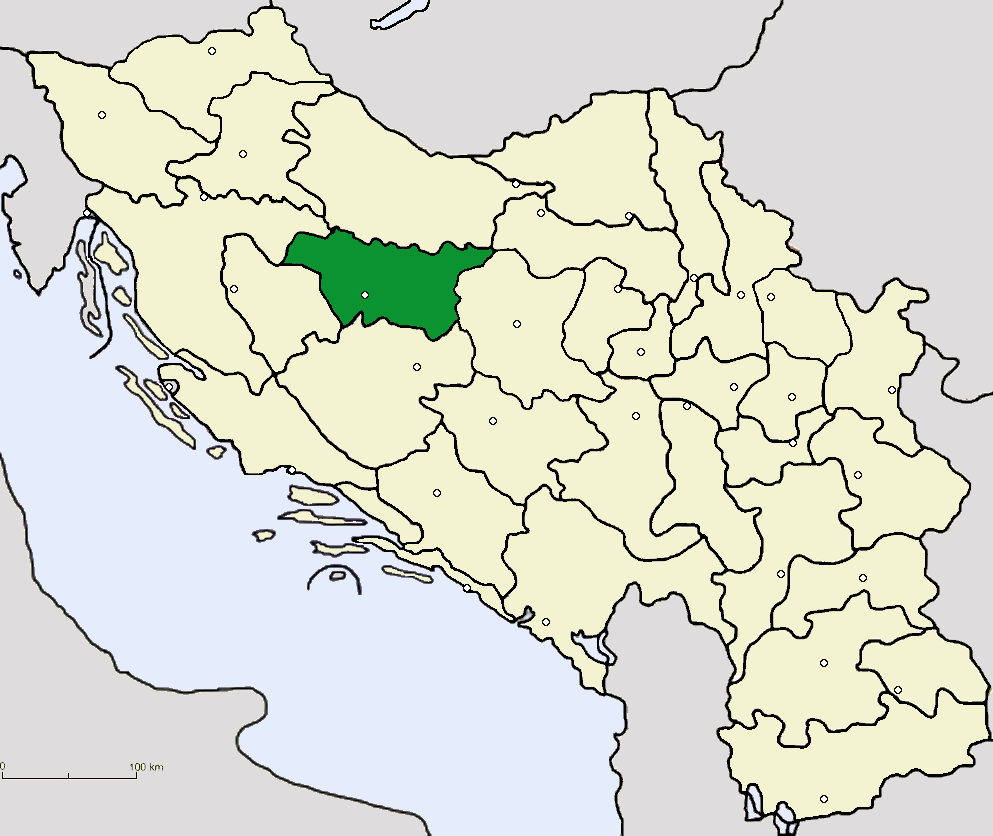
- Vrbas Oblast and surrounding areas
- Capital: Banja Luka
- Area
  - Coordinates: 44°46′N 17°11′E
- History
  - Established: 1922
  - Disestablished: 1929
Preceded by	Succeeded by
District of Banja Luka	Vrbas Banovina
- Today part of: Bosnia and Herzegovina

Vrbas Oblast (Serbo-Croatian: Врбас област, romanized: Vrbas Oblast) was one of the oblasts of the Kingdom of Serbs, Croats and Slovenes from 1922 to 1929. Its capital was Banja Luka. It was named after the Vrbas River.

== History ==
The Kingdom of Serbs, Croats and Slovenes was formed in 1918 and was initially divided into counties and districts (this division was inherited from previous state administrations). In 1922, the country was divided into 33 new administrative units known as oblasts (Serbo-Croatian: oblasti / области). Before 1922, the territory of the Vrbas Oblast was primarily part of the Banja Luka District.

In 1929, the 33 oblasts were administratively replaced with 9 banovinas and one district, and the territory of the Vrbas Oblast formed the core of the new Vrbas Banovina.

== Geography ==
The Vrbas Oblast included eastern Bosanska Krajina and western Semberija. It shared borders with the Tuzla Oblast in the east, the Travnik Oblast in the south, the Bihać Oblast in the west, the Osijek Oblast in the north, and the Primorje-Krajina Oblast in the northwest.

== Demographics ==
According to the 1921 census, the Vrbas Oblast was linguistically dominated by speakers of Serbo-Croatian.

== Cities and Towns ==
The main cities and towns located within the oblast were:

- Banja Luka
- Novi Grad
- Kostajnica
- Laktaši
- Prijedor
- Gradiška
- Prnjavor
- Brod

All the mentioned cities and towns are now part of Bosnia and Herzegovina.

== See also ==
- Banja Luka
- Vrbas (river)
- Kingdom of Serbs, Croats and Slovenes
