= Bihać Oblast =

Former oblast of Yugoslavia

Bihaćka Oblast Бихаћка област
- Oblast of the Kingdom of Serbs, Croats and Slovenes
- 1922–1929
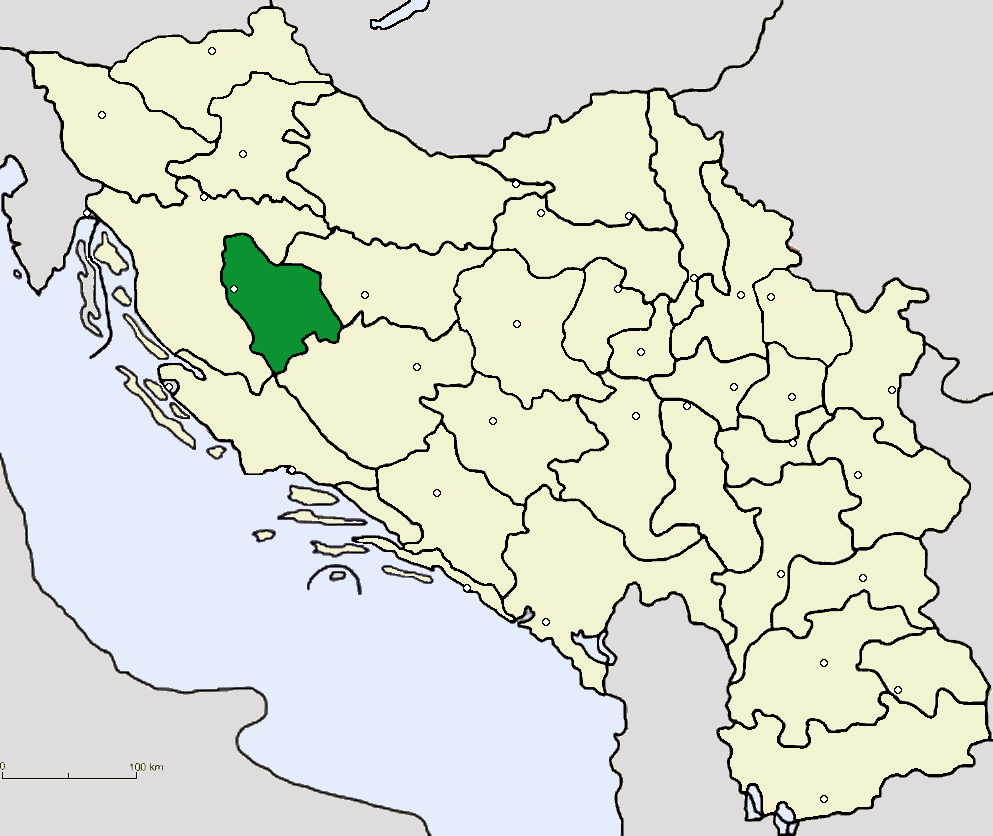
- Bihać Oblast
- Capital: Bihać
- Area
  - Coordinates: 44°49′N 15°52′E
- History
  - Established: 1922
  - Disestablished: 1929
Preceded by	Succeeded by
District of Bihać	Vrbas Banovina
- Today part of: Bosnia and Herzegovina

Bihać Oblast (Serbo-Croatian: Бихаћка област, romanized: Bihaćka Oblast) was one of the oblasts of the Kingdom of Serbs, Croats and Slovenes from 1922 to 1929. Its administrative center was Bihać.

== History ==
The Kingdom of Serbs, Croats and Slovenes was formed in 1918 and was initially divided into counties and districts (this division was inherited from previous state administrations). In 1922, new administrative units known as oblasts (Serbo-Croatian: oblasti / области) were introduced and the whole country was divided into 33 oblasts. Before 1922, the territory of the Bihać Oblast was part of the Bihać District.

In 1929, the 33 oblasts were administratively replaced with 9 banovinas and one district, and the territory of the Bihać Oblast was incorporated into the new Vrbas Banovina.

== Geography ==
The Bihać Oblast included western Bosanska Krajina. It shared borders with the Vrbas Oblast in the east, the Travnik Oblast in the south, and the Primorje-Krajina Oblast in the northwest.

== Demographics ==
According to the 1921 census, the Bihać Oblast was linguistically dominated by speakers of Serbo-Croatian.

== Cities and Towns ==
The main cities and towns located within the oblast were:

- Bihać
- Bosanska Krupa
- Bosanski Petrovac
- Bužim
- Cazin
- Ključ
- Sanski Most
- Velika Kladuša

All the mentioned cities and towns are now part of Bosnia and Herzegovina

== See also ==
- Bihać
- Kingdom of Serbs, Croats and Slovenes
