= Osijek Oblast =

Osijek Oblast Osječka oblast (Croatian)
- Oblast of the Kingdom of Serbs, Croats and Slovenes
- 1922–1929
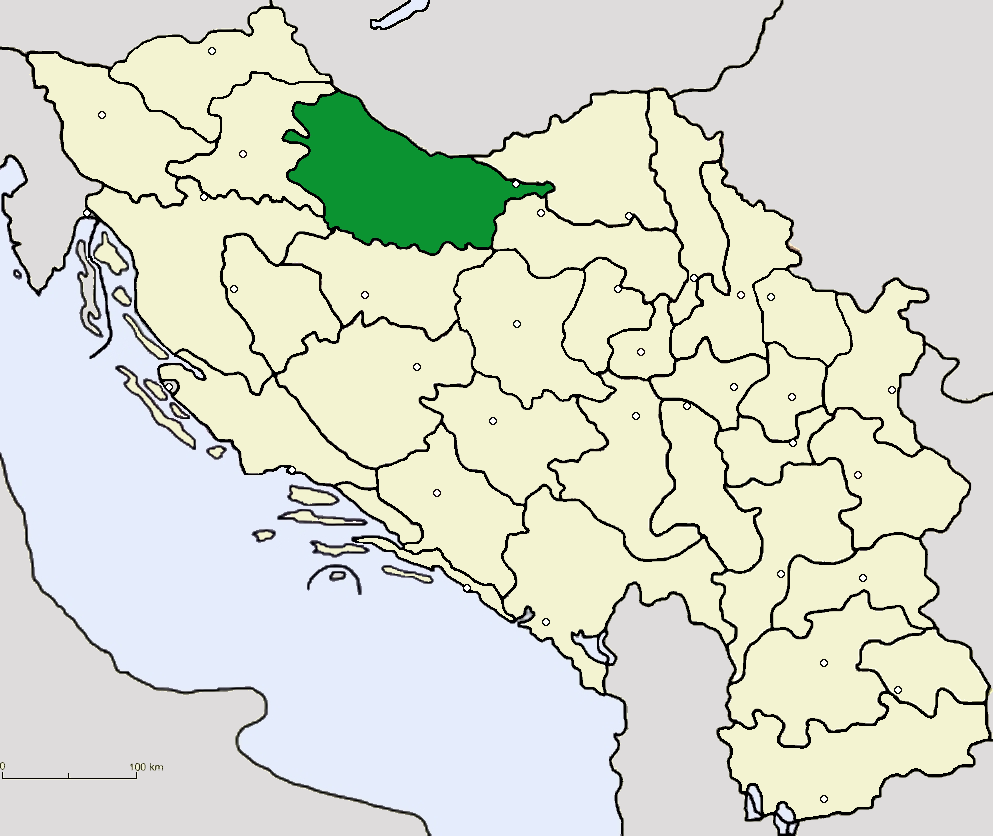
- Capital: Osijek
- Area
  - estimate: 13,394 km^{2} (5,171 sq mi)
- Population
  - estimate: 775,823
- History
  - Vidovdan Constitution: 1922
  - Royal dictatorship: 1929
Preceded by
Bjelovar-Križevci
Virovitica County
Požega County
Succeeded by
Sava Banovina
- Today part of: Croatia

The Osijek Oblast (Croatian: Osječka oblast) was an administrative division of the Kingdom of Serbs, Croats and Slovenes. It existed from 1922 to 1929 and its capital was the city of Osijek.

== Oblast elections ==
Elections in oblasts were held once on January 23, 1927.

Parties	Representatives	From Osijek	Percentage
Croatian Peasant Party	59	1	76.6%
Independent Democratic Party	11	-	14.3%
Croatian Federalist Peasant Party	3	3	3.9%
People's Radical Party	2	1	2.6%
Croatian Party of Rights	1	-	1.3%
Independent Democratic Party dissidents	1	-	1.3%
Total	77	5	100.0%

== Veliki župan ==
The oblast was headed by a veliki župan (Serbo-Croatian and Slovenian for "Great prefect"). They were:

- Franjo Gabrek (1922 – 1924)
- Ante Perković (1924 – 1925)
- Ljudevit Gaj (1925 – 1927)
- Radmilo Vujović (1927 – 1928)
- Ladislav Hanžeković (1928 – 1929)
- Juraj Kučić (1929)
- Ante Perković (1929)

== See also ==
- Osijek-Baranja County
