= Administrative divisions of the Banovina of Croatia =

Former districts of Yugoslavia

Map of cities and municipalities of the Banovina of Croatia in 1940

The subdivisions of the Banovina of Croatia, an autonomous banate within the Kingdom of Yugoslavia, were districts, cities, municipalities, and cadastral municipalities.

On the first level, there were 99 districts (srez, pl. srezovi). On the second level, there were 25 cities (grad, pl. gradovi) and 693 municipalities (općina, pl. općine). On the third level, there were 3,703 cadastral municipalities.

== List of cities and municipalities ==
| District | Cities and municipalities |
|---|---|
| Benkovac | Cities: |
| Benkovac | Municipalities: Benkovac · Kistanje · Novigrad · Obrovac · Ravni Kotari · Stankovci |
| Biograd | Cities: |
| Biograd | Municipalities: Biograd · Nin · Zemunik |
| Bjelovar | Cities: Bjelovar |
| Bjelovar | Municipalities: Farkaševac · Gudovac · Ivanska · Kapela · Nova Rača · Predavac · Prespa · Severin · Trojstvo · Velika Pisanica · Zrinski Topolovac |
| Brač | Cities: |
| Brač | Municipalities: Bol · Milna · Nerežišća · Postira · Pučišća · Selca · Supetar · Sutivan |
| Brčko | Cities: |
| Brčko | Municipalities: Bosanski Šamac · Brčko · Brezovo Polje · Bukvik · Čelić · Donja Mahala · Gornji Rahić · Obudovac · Tramošnica |
| Brinje | Cities: |
| Brinje | Municipalities: Brinje · Jezerane |
| Bugojno | Cities: |
| Bugojno | Municipalities: Bugojno · Gornji Vakuf · Kupres |
| Crikvenica | Cities: |
| Crikvenica | Municipalities: Crikvenica · Drivenik · Grižane-Belgrad · Selce · Sveti Jakov Šiljevica |
| Čabar | Cities: |
| Čabar | Municipalities: Čabar · Draga · Gerovo · Osilnica · Plešce · Prezid |
| Čakovec | Cities: Čakovec |
| Čakovec | Municipalities: Belica · Čakovec-Okolica · Gornji Mihaljevec · Macinec · Mursko Središće · Nedelišće · Podturen · Strahoninec · Sveti Juraj na Bregu · Sveti Martin na Muri · Vratišinec |
| Čazma | Cities: |
| Čazma | Municipalities: Čazma · Dubrava · Ivanić-Grad · Kloštar Ivanić · Križ · Štefanje |
| Daruvar | Cities: |
| Daruvar | Municipalities: Bijela · Daruvar · Daruvarski Brestovac · Dežanovac · Đulaves (Miokovićevo) · Končanica · Sirač · Uljanik · Vanjski Daruvar · Veliki Bastaji |
| Delnice | Cities: |
| Delnice | Municipalities: Brod na Kupi · Brod-Moravice · Crni Lug · Delnice · Fužine · Lič · Lokve · Mrkopalj · Skrad |
| Derventa | Cities: |
| Derventa | Municipalities: Bosanski Brod · Bosanski Kobaš · Derventa · Derventa-selo · Lužani Mulabegovi · Osinja · Plehan · Podnovlje |
| Donja Stubica | Cities: |
| Donja Stubica | Municipalities: Bistra · Donja Stubica · Gornja Stubica · Marija Bistrica · Oroslavje |
| Donji Lapac | Cities: |
| Donji Lapac | Municipalities: Donji Lapac · Srb |
| Donji Miholjac | Cities: |
| Donji Miholjac | Municipalities: Čađavica · Donji Miholjac · Marijanci · Podravska Moslavina · Podravski Podgajci · Šljivoševci · Viljevo |
| Dubrovnik | Cities: Dubrovnik |
| Dubrovnik | Municipalities: Cavtat (Konavlje) · Janjina · Kuna · Lopud · Mljet · Pelješac (Orebić) · Slano · Ston · Šipan · Trpanj · Zaton (Orašac) |
| Dugo Selo | Cities: |
| Dugo Selo | Municipalities: Brckovljani · Dugo Selo · Lupoglav · Oborovo · Posavski Bregi |
| Duvno | Cities: |
| Duvno | Municipalities: Grabovica · Tomislavgrad · Vir |
| Đakovo | Cities: |
| Đakovo | Municipalities: Bračevci · Budrovci · Drenje · Đakovo · Gašinci · Gorjani · Krndija · Levanjska Varoš · Piškorevci · Punitovci · Satnica Đakovačka · Selci Đakovački · Semeljci · Striživojna · Trnava · Viškovci · Vrbica · Vrpolje · Vuka |
| Đurđevac | Cities: |
| Đurđevac | Municipalities: Đurđevac · Ferdinandovac (Jelačićevo) · Kalinovac · Kloštar · Molve · Pitomača · Podravske Sesvete · Šemovci · Virje |
| Fojnica | Cities: |
| Fojnica | Municipalities: Brestovsko · Busovača · Fojnica · Kiseljak · Kreševo |
| Garešnica | Cities: |
| Garešnica | Municipalities: Berek · Garešnica · Hercegovac · Hrastovac · Veliki Zdenci · Vukovje |
| Glina | Cities: |
| Glina | Municipalities: Banski Grabovac · Bučica · Glina · Jukinac · Klasnić · Kraljevčani · Maja · Mali Gradac · Stankovac |
| Gospić | Cities: |
| Gospić | Municipalities: Gospić · Karlobag · Lički Osik · Medak · Smiljan |
| Gračac | Cities: |
| Gračac | Municipalities: Bruvno · Gračac · Lovinac · Mazin · Zrmanja |
| Gradačac | Cities: |
| Gradačac | Municipalities: Gradačac · Modriča · Odžak · Srnice · Vranjak |
| Grubišno Polje | Cities: |
| Grubišno Polje | Municipalities: Grubišno Polje · Ivanovo Selo · Veliki Grđevac |
| Hvar | Cities: |
| Hvar | Municipalities: Bogomolje · Hvar · Jelsa · Komiža · Stari Grad · Sućuraj · Vis · Vrboska |
| Ilok | Cities: |
| Ilok | Municipalities: Banoštar · Beočin · Bingula · Čerević · Erdevik · Ilok · Mohovo · Molovin · Neštin · Sot · Susek · Šarengrad |
| Imotski | Cities: |
| Imotski | Municipalities: Imotski |
| Ivanec | Cities: |
| Ivanec | Municipalities: Bednja · Cvetlin · Ivanec · Lepoglava · Maruševec · Višnjica |
| Jastrebarsko | Cities: |
| Jastrebarsko | Municipalities: Cvetković · Gornji Desinec · Jastrebarsko · Kalje · Klinča Sela · Krašić · Petrovina · Sošice · Sveta Jana · Vivodina |
| Karlovac | Cities: Karlovac |
| Karlovac | Municipalities: Barilović · Draganići · Duga Resa · Jaškovo · Netretić · Ozalj · Rečica · Ribnik · Šišljavić |
| Kastav | Cities: |
| Kastav | Municipalities: Kastav |
| Klanjec | Cities: |
| Klanjec | Municipalities: Dubravica · Klanjec · Kraljevec · Luka · Tuhelj · Veliko Trgovišće · Zagorska Sela |
| Knin | Cities: |
| Knin | Municipalities: Drniš · Knin · Promina |
| Konjic | Cities: |
| Konjic | Municipalities: Konjic · Ostrožac |
| Koprivnica | Cities: Koprivnica |
| Koprivnica | Municipalities: Drnje · Đelekovec · Gola · Hlebine · Koprivnički Ivanec · Legrad · Novigrad Podravski · Peteranec · Sokolovac · Ždala |
| Korčula | Cities: |
| Korčula | Municipalities: Blato · Korčula · Vela Luka |
| Korenica | Cities: |
| Korenica | Municipalities: Bunić · Korenica · Plitvička Jezera |
| Kostajnica | Cities: |
| Kostajnica | Municipalities: Bobovac · Crkveni Bok · Dubica · Kostajnica · Majur · Mečenčani · Staza |
| Krapina | Cities: |
| Krapina | Municipalities: Đurmanec · Krapina · Petrovsko · Radoboj · Zabok · Začretje |
| Križevci | Cities: Križevci |
| Križevci | Municipalities: Gradec · Raven · Sveti Ivan Žabno · Sveti Petar Čvrstec · Sveti Petar Orehovec · Vojakovac · Vrbovec |
| Krk | Cities: |
| Krk | Municipalities: Aleksandrovo (Punat) · Baška · Dobrinj · Dubašnica · Krk · Omišalj · Vrbnik |
| Kutina | Cities: |
| Kutina | Municipalities: Kutina · Ludina · Popovača |
| Livno | Cities: Livno |
| Livno | Municipalities: Donje Polje · Gornje Polje · Priluka · Šujica |
| Ludbreg | Cities: |
| Ludbreg | Municipalities: Ludbreg · Mali Bukovec · Martijanec · Rasinja · Vanjski Ludbreg |
| Ljubuški | Cities: |
| Ljubuški | Municipalities: Drinovci · Humac · Ljubuški · Posušje · Vitina · Zvirovići |
| Makarska | Cities: |
| Makarska | Municipalities: Gornje Primorje (Gradac) · Makarska · Vrgorac |
| Metković | Cities: |
| Metković | Municipalities: Metković · Opuzen |
| Mostar | Cities: Mostar |
| Mostar | Municipalities: Bijelo Polje · Blagaj · Donje Brotnjo · Drežnica · Gornje Brotnjo · Kočerin · Mostar-Sela · Mostarsko Blato · Široki Brijeg · Žitomislić |
| Našice | Cities: |
| Našice | Municipalities: Budimci · Čačinci · Đurđenovac · Feričanci · Klokočevci · Koška · Našice · Obradovci (Slavonske Bare) · Orahovica · Podgorač · Vanjske Našice · Zdenci |
| Nova Gradiška | Cities: |
| Nova Gradiška | Municipalities: Cernik · Davor · Nova Gradiška · Nova Kapela · Orubica · Rešetari · Staro Petrovo Selo · Štivica · Vanjska Nova Gradiška |
| Novi | Cities: |
| Novi | Municipalities: Bribir · Ledenice · Novi |
| Novi Marof | Cities: |
| Novi Marof | Municipalities: Breznički Hum · Gornja Rijeka · Ljubešćica · Novi Marof · Vanjske Varaždinske Toplice · Varaždinske Toplice |
| Novska | Cities: |
| Novska | Municipalities: Banova Jaruga · Jasenovac · Krapje · Lipovljani · Lonja · Međurić · Novska · Vanjska Novska |
| Ogulin | Cities: |
| Ogulin | Municipalities: Drežnica · Generalski Stol · Gomirje · Gornje Dubrave · Josipdol · Modruš · Ogulin · Oštarije · Plaški · Tounj |
| Okučani | Cities: |
| Okučani | Municipalities: Dragalić · Mašić (Medari) · Okučani · Rajić · Stara Gradiška |
| Osijek | Cities: Osijek |
| Osijek | Municipalities: Aljmaš · Bijelo Brdo · Čepin · Dalj · Erdut · Ernestinovo · Hrastin · Jovanovac · Laslovo · Retfala · Sarvaš · Tenja |
| Otočac | Cities: |
| Otočac | Municipalities: Brlog · Dabar · Otočac · Sinac · Škare · Vrhovine |
| Pakrac | Cities: |
| Pakrac | Municipalities: Antunovac · Badljevina · Bučje · Čaglić · Dragović · Gaj · Kukunjevac · Lipik · Pakrac · Poljana |
| Perušić | Cities: |
| Perušić | Municipalities: Kosinj · Pazarište · Perušić |
| Petrinja | Cities: Petrinja |
| Petrinja | Municipalities: Blinja · Gora · Gradusa · Hrastovica · Jabukovac · Mošćenica · Sunja |
| Pisarovina | Cities: |
| Pisarovina | Municipalities: Donja Kupčina · Kupinec · Lasinja · Pisarovina · Pokupsko |
| Požega | Cities: Požega |
| Požega | Municipalities: Bekteže · Jakšić · Kaptol · Kutjevo · Mihaljevci · Pleternica · Požeški Brestovac · Ruševo · Stražeman · Vanjska Požega · Velika · Vilić-Selo |
| Pregrada | Cities: |
| Pregrada | Municipalities: Desinić · Hum na Sutli · Krapinske Toplice · Pregrada |
| Preko | Cities: |
| Preko | Municipalities: Božava · Preko · Sali · Silba · Veli Iž |
| Prelog | Cities: |
| Prelog | Municipalities: Dekanovec · Donja Dubrava · Donji Kraljevec · Donji Vidovec · Draškovec · Goričan · Hodošan · Kotoriba · Mala Subotica · Prelog · Sveta Marija na Muri · Sveti Juraj u Trnju |
| Prozor | Cities: |
| Prozor | Municipalities: Gornja Rama · Prozor |
| Rab | Cities: |
| Rab | Municipalities: Novalja · Pag · Rab |
| Samobor | Cities: |
| Samobor | Municipalities: Podvrh · Samobor · Sveta Nedelja · Sveti Martin pod Okićem |
| Senj | Cities: Senj |
| Senj | Municipalities: Jablanac · Krivi Put · Sveti Juraj |
| Sinj | Cities: |
| Sinj | Municipalities: Sinj · Trilj · Vrlika |
| Sisak | Cities: Sisak |
| Sisak | Municipalities: Gušće · Kratečko · Lekenik · Letovanić · Martinska Ves · Palanjek · Sela · Topolovac |
| Slatina | Cities: |
| Slatina | Municipalities: Čeralije · Gornji Miholjac · Nova Bukovica · Podravska Slatina · Slatinski Drenovac · Sopje · Voćin |
| Slavonski Brod | Cities: Slavonski Brod |
| Slavonski Brod | Municipalities: Andrijevci · Bebrina · Beravci · Brodski Drenovac · Brodski Stupnik · Brodski Varoš · Garčin · Kaniža · Klakar · Kobaš · Lužani · Oriovac · Podcrkavlje · Podvinj · Sibinj · Svilaj · Trnjani · Velika Kopanica |
| Slunj | Cities: |
| Slunj | Municipalities: Cetingrad · Drežnik · Primišlje · Rakovica · Slunj · Veljun |
| Split | Cities: Split |
| Split | Municipalities: Donja Kaštela · Kaštel Lukšić · Kaštel Sućurac · Klis · Krajina (Šestanovac) · Lećevica · Muć · Omiš · Poljica · Šolta · Trogir |
| Stolac | Cities: |
| Stolac | Municipalities: Aladinići · Berkovići · Burmazi · Čapljina · Hutovo · Stolac |
| Sušak | Cities: Bakar · Sušak |
| Sušak | Municipalities: Cernik-Čavle · Dol-Bakarac · Grobnik · Hreljin · Jelenje · Kraljevica · Krasica |
| Sveti Ivan Zelina | Cities: |
| Sveti Ivan Zelina | Municipalities: Donja Zelina · Kašina · Moravče Belovar · Sveti Ivan Zelina · Sašinovec · Vanjski Sveti Ivan Zelina |
| Šibenik | Cities: Šibenik |
| Šibenik | Municipalities: Skradin · Tijesno · Vodice · Zlarin |
| Šid | Cities: |
| Šid | Municipalities: Adaševci · Bačinci · Bapska Novak · Batrovci · Berkasovo · Gibarac · Ilača · Ilinci · Jamena · Kukujevci · Lipovac · Mala Vašica · Morović · Strošinci · Šid · Šidski Banovci · Tovarnik |
| Travnik | Cities: Travnik |
| Travnik | Municipalities: Bila · Bučići · Turbe · Vitez |
| Udbina | Cities: |
| Udbina | Municipalities: Podlapac · Udbina |
| Valpovo | Cities: |
| Valpovo | Municipalities: Belišće · Bizovac · Brođanci · Ladimirevci · Petrijevci · Valpovo · Vanjsko Valpovo |
| Varaždin | Cities: Varaždin |
| Varaždin | Municipalities: Bartolovec · Biškupec · Jalžabet · Križovljan Cestica · Petrijanec · Vidovec · Vinica |
| Velika Gorica | Cities: |
| Velika Gorica | Municipalities: Dubranec · Kravarsko · Novo Čiče · Odra · Orle · Velika Gorica · Vukovina |
| Vinkovci | Cities: Vinkovci |
| Vinkovci | Municipalities: Andrijaševci · Cerna · Donje Novo Selo · Ivankovo · Jarmina · Komletinci · Laze · Mirkovci · Nijemci · Novi Jankovci · Novo Selo · Orolik · Otok · Privlaka · Retkovci · Slakovci · Stari Jankovci · Stari Mikanovci · Vođinci |
| Virovitica | Cities: Virovitica |
| Virovitica | Municipalities: Cabuna · Gradina · Lukač · Pivnica · Suhopolje · Špišić Bukovica |
| Vojnić | Cities: |
| Vojnić | Municipalities: Krnjak · Krstinja · Perjasica · Skakavac · Tušilović · Vojnić · Vukmanić |
| Vrbovsko | Cities: |
| Vrbovsko | Municipalities: Bosiljevo · Ravna Gora · Severin na Kupi · Srpske Moravice · Vrbovsko |
| Vrginmost | Cities: |
| Vrginmost | Municipalities: Bović · Čemernica · Topusko · Vrginmost |
| Vukovar | Cities: Vukovar |
| Vukovar | Municipalities: Antin · Berak · Bobota · Bogdanovci · Borovo · Bršadin · Cerić · Čakovci · Gaboš · Korog · Lovas · Marinci · Markušica · Mikluševci · Negoslavci · Nuštar · Opatovac · Ostrovo · Pačetin · Petrovci · Sotin · Svinjarevci · Tompojevci · Tordinci · Trpinja · Vera |
| Zagreb | Cities: Zagreb |
| Zagreb | Municipalities: Brdovec · Brezovica · Gračani (Remete) · Kustošija · Markuševec · Pušća · Sesvete · Stenjevec · Stupnik · Sveta Klara · Šestine · Vrapče · Zaprešić |
| Zlatar | Cities: |
| Zlatar | Municipalities: Bedekovčina · Budinšćina · Hrašćina-Trgovišće · Lobor · Mače · Mihovljan · Zlatar |
| Županja | Cities: |
| Županja | Municipalities: Babina Greda · Bošnjaci · Drenovci · Gradište · Gundinci · Gunja · Posavski Podgajci · Račinovci · Rajevo Selo · Sikirevci · Soljani · Šamac · Štitar · Vrbanja · Županja |

== See also ==
- Administrative divisions of Croatia
- Administrative divisions of Yugoslavia
