= Stražanac =

- Village
- Location within Croatia
- Coordinates: 45.6241329°N 17.0611795°E
- Country: Croatia
- County: Bjelovar-Bilogora County
- Municipality: Končanica

Area
  - Total: 2.7 sq mi (7.0 km^{2})

Population (2021)
  - Total: 97
  - Density: 36/sq mi (14/km^{2})
- Time zone: UTC+1 (CET)
  - Summer (DST): UTC+2 (CEST)

Stražanac is a village in Croatia.

== Demographics ==
According to the 2021 census, its population was 97.

== History ==
During the time of Austro-hungarian Monarchy, Stražanac was called Alajoš-salaš, by nobleman Alajoš Tüköry, who had lived in Dioš.

After of the fall of the monarchy in 1918, Hungarians and Austrians started to move out and in 1921, Croats from areas of Karlovac and Samobor started to move in. So they, along with Valent Slanac, had given Alajoš-salaš a new name, Stražanac, because at the time, the guards were patrolling around the village.

After the Second World War, Croats from Croatian Zagorje also started to populate the village.
