= Administrative divisions of Croatia =

The subdivisions of Croatia on the first level are the 20 counties (županija, pl. županije) and one city-county (grad, "city").

On the second level these are municipalities (općina, pl. općine) and cities (grad, pl. gradovi). Both of these types of subdivisions encompass one or multiple settlements (naselje, pl. naselja) which are not public or legal entities, the Croatian Bureau of Statistics consider them as non-administrative units – human settlements, similar to the United States census designated places. As parts of the cities or the (larger) municipalities they may form city districts (gradski kotari or gradske četvrti) or local committee areas (mjesni odbori). Small municipalities usually consist of only one settlement.

== Current (since 1992) ==
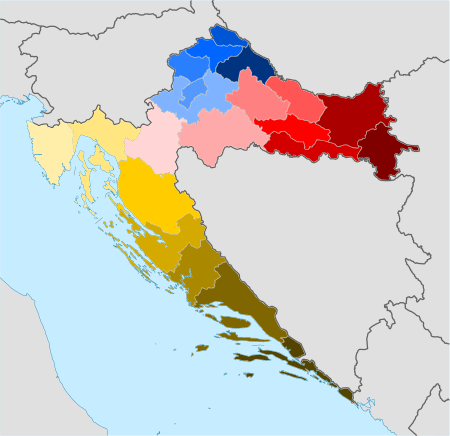
Counties of Croatia: Bjelovar-Bilogora Brod-Posavina Dubrovnik-Neretva Istria Karlovac Koprivnica-Križevci Krapina-Zagorje Lika-inline Osijek-Baranja Požega-Slavonia Primorje-Gorski Kotar Šibenik-Knin Sisak-Moslavina Split-Dalmatia Varaždin Virovitica-Podravina Vukovar-Syrmia Zadar City of Zagreb Zagreb County

- Counties (21)
  - Bjelovar-Bilogora
  - Brod-Posavina
  - Dubrovnik-Neretva
  - Istria
  - Karlovac
  - Koprivnica-Križevci
  - Krapina-Zagorje
  - Lika-Senj
  - Međimurje
  - Osijek-Baranja
  - Požega-Slavonia
  - Primorje-Gorski Kotar
  - Šibenik-Knin
  - Sisak-Moslavina
  - Split-Dalmatia
  - Varaždin
  - Virovitica-Podravina
  - Vukovar-Syrmia
  - Zadar
  - Zagreb
  - City of Zagreb
- Cities and Municipalities (556)
- City districts and Local committee areas
- Settlements (6,749) (non-legal, non-public entities)

== 1975–1990 ==
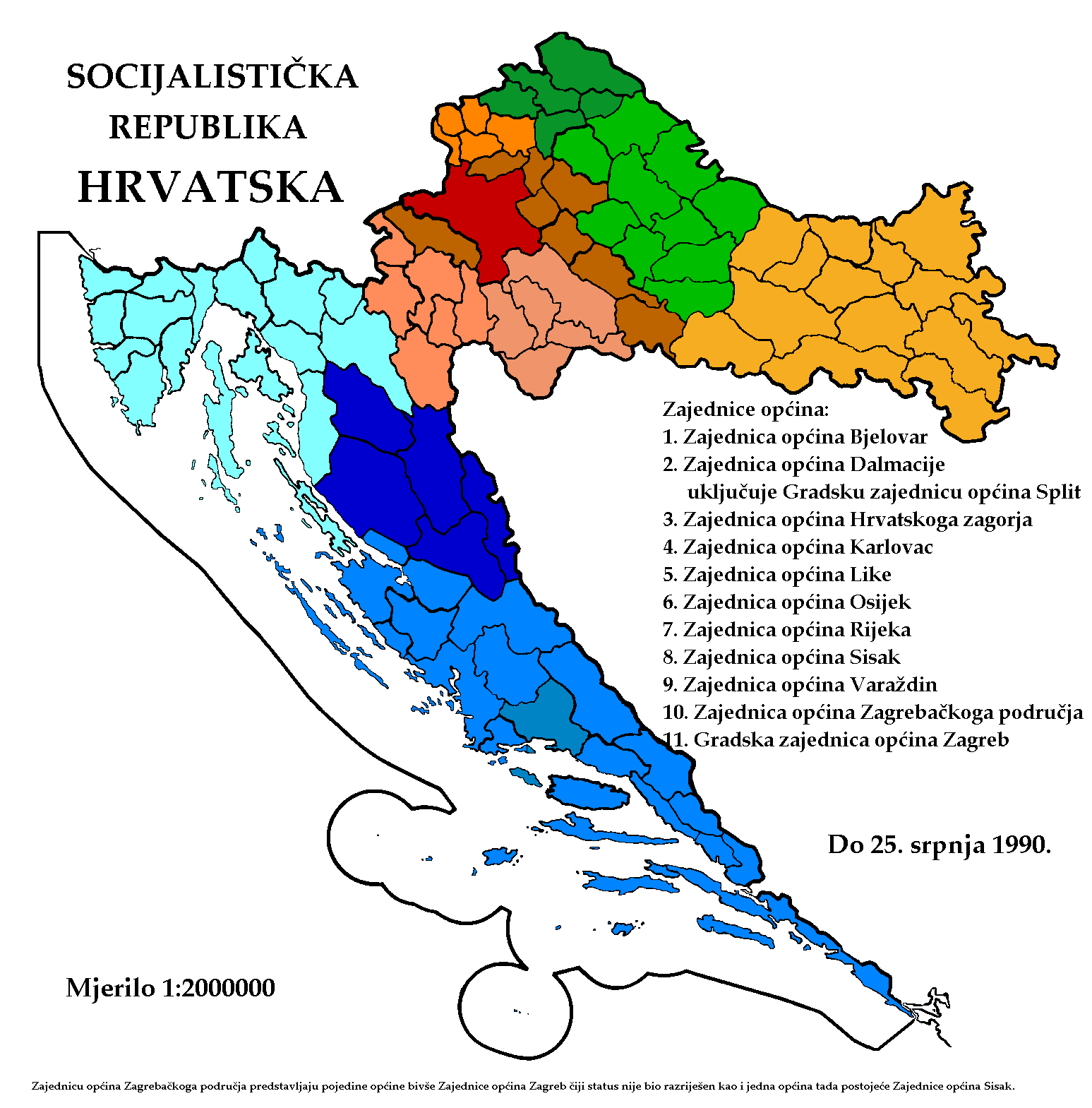
Unions of municipalities (1986–1990)

- Unions of Municipalities (zajednica općina, pl. zajednice općina) (11), including City of Zagreb Union of Municipalities (Zagreb metropolitan area) and City of Split Union of Municipalities (Split metropolitan area)
- Municipalities (općina, pl. općine)
- Local communities (mjesna zajednica, pl. mjesne zajednice)
- Settlements (non legal or public entities)

== 1967–1975 ==
- Municipalities
- Settlements (non legal or public entities)

== 1952–1967 ==
- Districts (kotar, pl. kotari) and Cities (grad, pl. gradovi)
- City municipalities (Townships) and Municipalities (gradske općine and općine)
- Settlements (non legal or public entities)

== 1947–1952 ==
- Oblasts
  - Bjelovar
  - Karlovac
  - Osijek
  - Rijeka
  - Split
  - Zagreb
- Districts
- People's Committee Areas (mjesni narodni odbori)

== 1945–1947 ==
- Oblasts
- Circles (okrug, pl. okruzi)
- Districts
- People's Committee Areas (mjesni narodni odbor, pl. mjesni narodni odbori) - village people's committees and, raion people's committee, town/city people's committee

N.B. Until 1963 all subdivisions were governed by the elected people's committees. From 1963 to 1992 these were administered by the respective (elected) assemblies.

== 1941–1945 ==
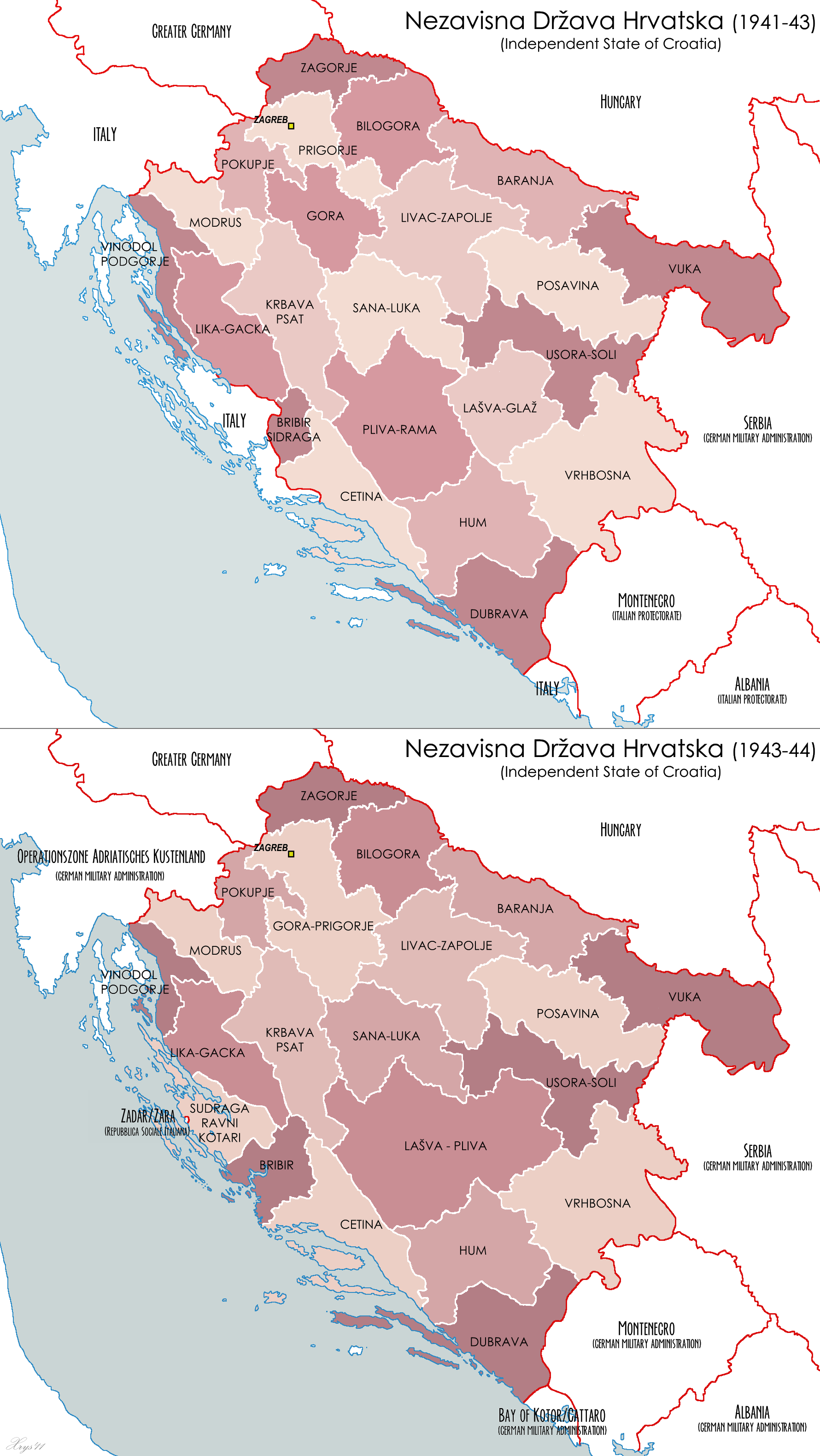
Independent State of Croatia, counties: 1941–1943 (1st) 1943–1944 (2nd)

Independent State of Croatia

- Counties (22)
  - Baranja
  - Bilogora
  - Bribir and Sidraga
  - Cetina
  - Dubrava
  - Gora
  - Hum
  - Krbava – Psat
  - Lašva and Glaž
  - Lika and Gacka
  - Livac and Zapolje
  - Modruš
  - Pliva and Rama
  - Pokupje
  - Posavje
  - Prigorje
  - Sana and Luka
  - Usora and Soli
  - Vinodol and Podgorje
  - Vrhbosna
  - Vuka
  - Zagorje
  - Zagreb
- Districts
- Municipalities
- Cadastral municipalities (katastarske općine) (non legal or public entities, non local authorities)

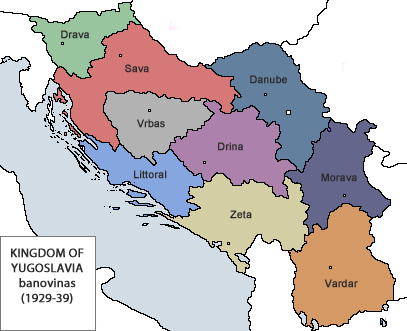
Sava and Littoral Banovina (red and blue)

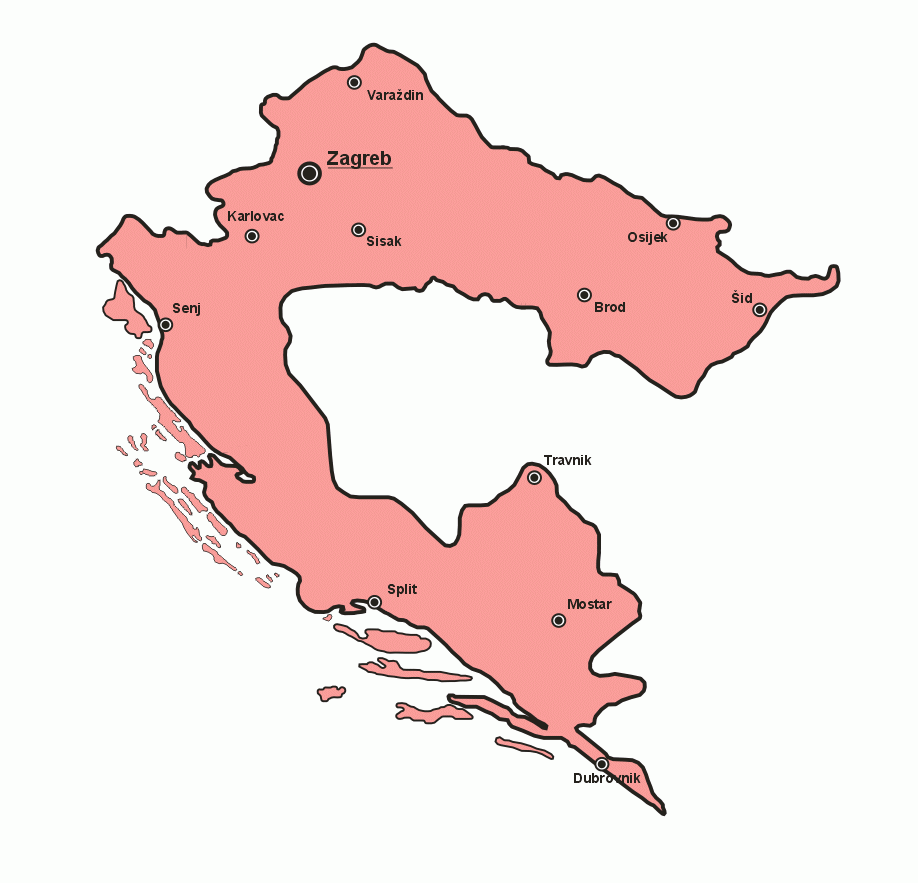
Banovina of Croatia

== 1929–1941 ==
- Banovinas
- Banovina of Croatia
  - Sava Banovina
  - Littoral Banovina
- Districts
- Cities and municipalities
- Cadastral municipalities (non legal or public entities, non local authorities)

== 1922–1929 ==
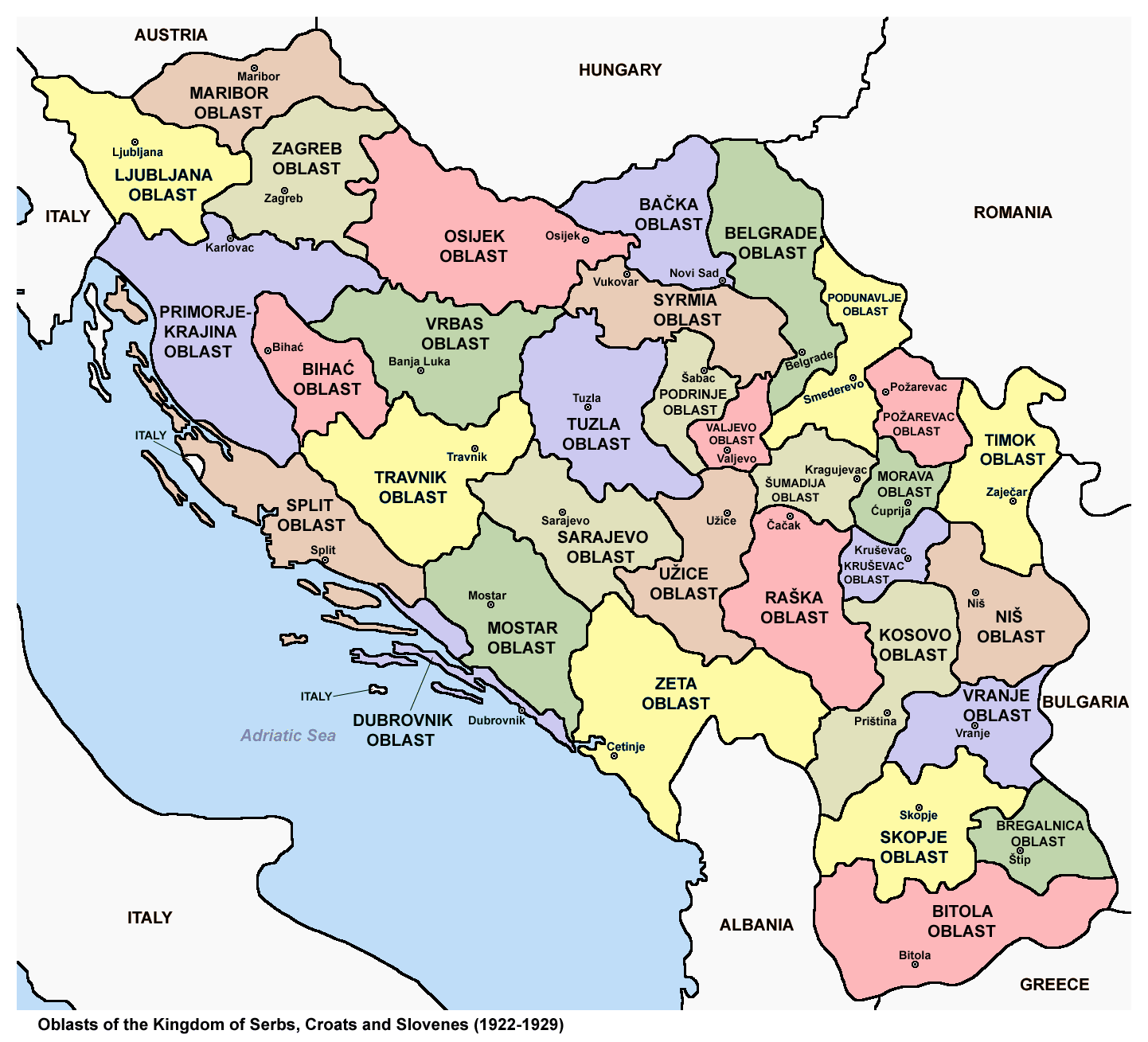
Oblasts of the Kingdom of Serbs, Croats and Slovenes

- Oblasts
  - Oblast of Dubrovnik
  - Oblast of Karlovac
  - Oblast of Osijek
  - Oblast of Split
  - Oblast of Vukovar (partially)
  - Oblast of Zagreb
- Districts
- Cities and municipalities
- Cadastral municipalities (non legal or public entities, non local authorities)

== Kingdom of Croatia-Slavonia (1868–1922) ==
Counties in the Kingdom of Croatia-Slavonia

- Counties
  - Modruš-Rijeka County
  - Zagreb County
  - Varaždin County
  - Bjelovar-Križevci County
  - Virovitica County
  - Požega County
  - Syrmia County
  - Lika-Krbava County
- Districts
- Cities and municipalities
- Cadastral municipalities (non legal or public entities, non local authorities)

== Medieval Croatian Kingdom ==
Approximate positions of the first counties of 10th century Croatia, overlaid on a map of modern Croatia and Bosnia-Herzegovina

- Counties
  - Livno
  - Cetina
  - Imotski
  - Pliva
  - Pesenta
  - Klis
  - Bribir
  - Nin
  - Knin
  - Sidraga
  - Nona (Luka)
  - Gacka
  - Krbava
  - Lika

== See also ==
- Counties of Croatia
- Croatian cities
- Municipalities of Croatia
- NUTS of Croatia
- ISO 3166-2 codes of Croatia
- Administrative divisions of the Banovina of Croatia
- Counties of the Independent State of Croatia
- Former counties of Croatia (in Kingdom of Croatia-Slavonia)
- Administrative divisions of Yugoslavia
