= Church of the Holy Archangel Gabriel, Susek =

Serbian Orthodox church in Vojvodina, Serbia

Church of the Holy Archangels Gabriel
- Црква светог арханђела Гаврила
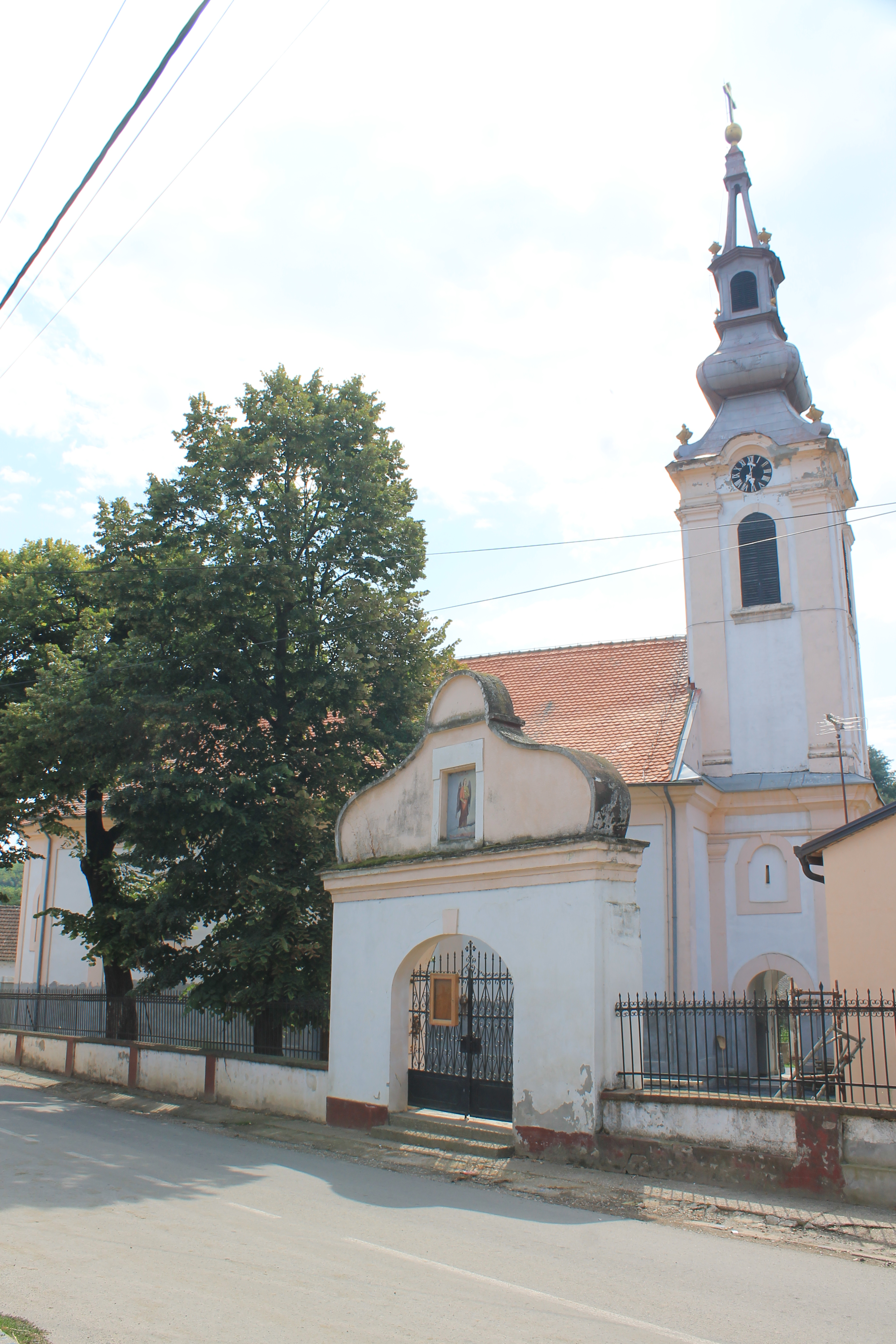
- Church of the Holy Archangel Gabriel
- Church of the Holy Archangels Gabriel
- 45°13′26″N 19°32′10″E
- Location: Susek, Vojvodina

Cultural Heritage of Serbia
- Type: Cultural Monument of Great Importance
- Designated: 1997
- Reference no.: СК 1197
- Country: Serbia
- Denomination: Serbian Orthodox

History
- Status: Church
- Dedication: Archangel Gabriel

Architecture
- Functional status: Active
- Years built: 1770

Administration
- Archdiocese: Eparchy of Srem

The Church of the Holy Archangel Gabriel (Serbian: Црква светог арханђела Гаврила) in Susek is Serbian Orthodox church in Vojvodina, Serbia. It represents a typical example of single-nave church building in Vojvodina built some fifty years following the Ottoman Empire forces expulsion after the Treaty of Karlowitz. The building was completed in 1770 as the fourth church building at the same site. The iconostasis, completed in 1779, is considered to be one of the masterpiece of Teodor Kračun, one of the most distinctive Serbian Baroque painters. The church was damaged during the World War II in Yugoslavia when the local orthodox population of Susek was a target of Genocide of Serbs in the Independent State of Croatia.

== See also ==
- Eparchy of Srem
