= Imsovac =

- Village
- Location within Croatia
- Coordinates: 45.6060695°N 17.0367474°E
- Country: Croatia
- County: Bjelovar-Bilogora County
- Municipality: Končanica

Area
  - Total: 5.0 sq mi (13.0 km^{2})

Population (2021)
  - Total: 135
  - Density: 26.9/sq mi (10.4/km^{2})
- Time zone: UTC+1 (CET)
  - Summer (DST): UTC+2 (CEST)

Imsovac is a village in Croatia.

== Demographics ==
According to the 2021 census, its population was 135.
