= Šuplja Lipa =

- Village
- Location within Croatia
- Coordinates: 45.6535018°N 17.1963495°E
- Country: Croatia
- County: Bjelovar-Bilogora County
- Municipality: Končanica

Area
  - Total: 3.1 sq mi (8.1 km^{2})

Population (2021)
  - Total: 129
  - Density: 41/sq mi (16/km^{2})
- Time zone: UTC+1 (CET)
  - Summer (DST): UTC+2 (CEST)

Šuplja Lipa is a village in Croatia.

== Demographics ==
According to the 2021 census, its population was 129.
