= 1940 Croatian local elections =

- 19 May, 26 May, 2 June 1940
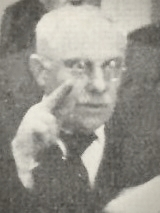

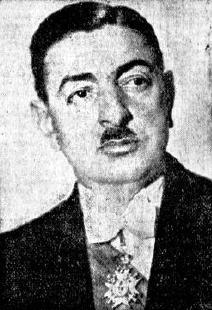

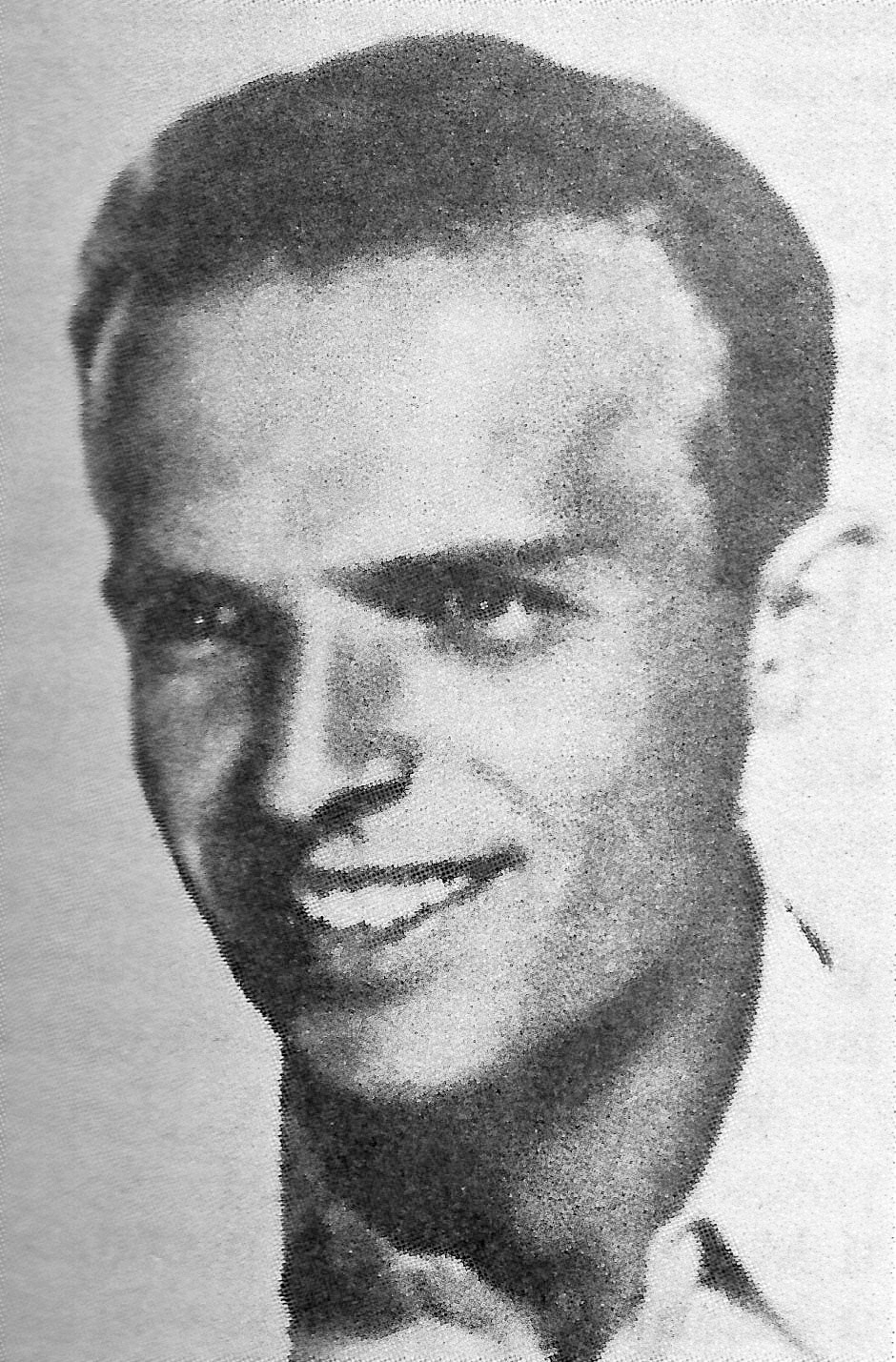
	First party	Second party
Leader	Vladko Maček
Party	HSS-SDS	Serb independent lists
Municipalities	588	34
Municipalities +/-		▲34
	Third party	Fourth party
Leader	Dragiša Cvetković	Rade Končar
Party	JRZ	Communists
Municipalities	22	4
Municipalities +/-	▼86	▲4
- HSS-SDS Coalition Serb independent lists JRZ Communists German lists Minority lists Farmers Muslim lists Davidović group Elections not held

The 1940 Croatian local elections were held in 625 municipalities of the Banovina of Croatia on 19 May 1940, and in 33 municipalities on 26 May and 2 June. These were the first elections following the Cvetković–Maček Agreement and the establishment of the autonomous Croatian Banate within the Kingdom of Yugoslavia. The elections were not held in cities and some Adriatic counties bordering, or adjacent to, Italy. Only men older than 24 were allowed to vote. Voting was public and conducted by voice.

The elections were a landslide victory for the Croatian Peasant Party (HSS) and the Independent Democratic Party (SDS), the ruling parties of the Banovina of Croatia, which together won a majority in 90% of municipalities. Serb independent lists, supported by organizations opposing the Cvetković–Maček Agreement, won around 5% of municipalities. The Yugoslav Radical Union (JRZ), the ruling party of the Kingdom of Yugoslavia, suffered a heavy defeat and lost control in 80% of its previously held municipalities.

Due to the outbreak of World War II, the 1941 invasion of Yugoslavia, and the subsequent period of communist rule, these were to be the last multi-party elections in Croatia until the 1990 parliamentary election, almost exactly fifty years later.

== Background ==
On 26 August 1939, the autonomous Banovina of Croatia was established within the Kingdom of Yugoslavia. It was formed under the Cvetković–Maček Agreement, signed by Dragiša Cvetković, in the name of the Yugoslav Government, and Vladko Maček, the leader of the Croatian Peasant Party (HSS). The Banovina of Croatia included the entire Sava Banovina and Littoral Banovina, as well as parts of the Drina, Zeta, and Danube Banovinas. Its capital was Zagreb and Ivan Šubašić of the HSS was appointed as Ban of Croatia.

After the HSS achieved its main goal, Croatian autonomy in Yugoslavia, it had to face many new and difficult challenges in taking political responsibility in Croatia and addressing the hopes and expectations of the electorate. Due to the outbreak of the World War II, political leaders in Yugoslavia wanted to appease Germany and align the country with the Third Reich, tying their exports in vital war materials (aluminium, grain etc.) to Germany. Dire economic situation that resulted from the war heavily struck the impoverished peasants and workers in Croatia, still recovering from the Great Depression of the 1930s. The price of food in Croatia rose by between 50% (beef) and 100% (flour, potatoes, beans) between August 1939 and the summer of 1940. Gaping social inequality and the disappointment with the lack of profound political and social change that many expected to occur after Croatia gained its autonomy soon resulted in the rise of support for the Communists and right-wing extremists. Protests and demonstrations against the rising living costs, food and fuel shortages, high unemployment and inequality, as well as the approaching of the war, became ever more often. HSS authorities responded by persecuting trade unions, communists, underground Ustashe, as well as Yugoslav and Serb nationalists, increasingly relying on its paramilitary, Zaštita. During a communist protest in Split on 17 December 1939, the police fired at the crowd, injuring many and killing young shipyard worker and communist party member, football player Vicko Buljanović. His funeral the next day drew a crowd of 25,000 while 12,000 participated in a mass strike in Split and the surrounding region.

After terrorist attacks that included planting explosives in public locations in Zagreb, in February 1940 the Croatian Government banned the fascist Ustashe periodicals (among which Hrvatski narod) and interned 50 Ustashe members in Lepoglava prison, among whom was Mile Budak. Maček viewed the Greater Serbian organizations, the Communists, and the Frankists (Frankovci), a name he used for far-right extremists, as a danger to the existence of the common state. For him, the Communists were a "fifth column" of the Soviet Union, and he described the actions of the Frankists as "directed by Pavelić's emigrants from Italy". The Croatian Government also used the Lepoglava prison for the imprisonment of Communists, and the newly built Kruščica camp near Travnik as a detention site for the Frankists.

Maček addressing Croatian audience from Banski dvori in a newsreel explaining the importance of Croatian autonomy, January 1940

Under the Cvetković–Maček Agreement that established the Croatian autonomy, it was envisaged that the Croatian Parliament (Hrvatski Sabor) would be elected. Since August 1939, in absence of a Croatian legislature, Ban Šubašić governed through decrees and executive orders. Finally, on January 14, Regent Paul visited Croatia's capital, Zagreb, and co-signed the electoral law for Sabor elections. In preparation of these elections to elect the first Croatian legislature since Sabor of Kingdom of Croatia-Slavonia was elected in 1913, the local elections in municipalities were about to take place. The last local elections of 1936 and the most recent parliamentary elections of 1938, despite being marred by regime violence, police obstruction and occasional casualties, showed strong support for the HSS-led opposition to the ruling parties and the King of Yugoslavia.

In April, Ban Ivan Šubašić issued an executive order detailing the rules for the local elections. The list that gains relative majority was to be assigned a third of the seats in the council, while the remaining two thirds were to be divided among the lists relative to their votes under the proportional d'Hondt method. Under the old rules, the party with relative majority was immediately assigned two-thirds of the seats. The council president (mayor) was to be elected on a secret ballot in the council, but does not necessarily have to be a councilman. Municipal clerks (notaries, treasuries) became Banovina's employees, not local ones. Ban of Croatia also had the right to regroup the municipalities, dissolve them, and change their borders. Šubašić used this right to regroup municipalities in Posavina, in Derventa, Brčko and Gradačac districts.

On April 22, Šubašić called the elections for May 19. Due to the WWII engulfing most of Europe and the Royal Yugoslav Army being placed at the higher level of alertness, many men were called to serve with the reserve troops or to take part in the army maneuvers. HSS decided not to call the elections in cities, but just municipalities. In cities, HSS-led Croatian government appointed HSS members as mayors or commissioners. In April, after the increased Serb nationalist activities refuting the Cvetković-Maček agreement, the government also dissolved the municipalities in Serb-majority Kistanje and Obrovac. Smilčić and Skradin municipalities were also dissolved.

On May 10, German army attacked the Low Countries and France, intensifying the war. Netherlands surrendered on 15 May. By 17 May, Germans occupied Brussels and overran most of Belgium, reaching the French channel. These events had a deep impact on public opinion in Yugoslavia.

Political situation in Europe in May 1940

=== Women's vote ===
Yugoslav magazine Žena danas ("Woman Today") started campaigning in October 1939 to extend the suffrage to women. Socialist trade unions and communists in Croatia supported the action. However, the women's organisation of HSS opposed it, declaring that the party leadership will decide when the best moment to introduce women's suffrage in Croatia is.

== Campaign ==
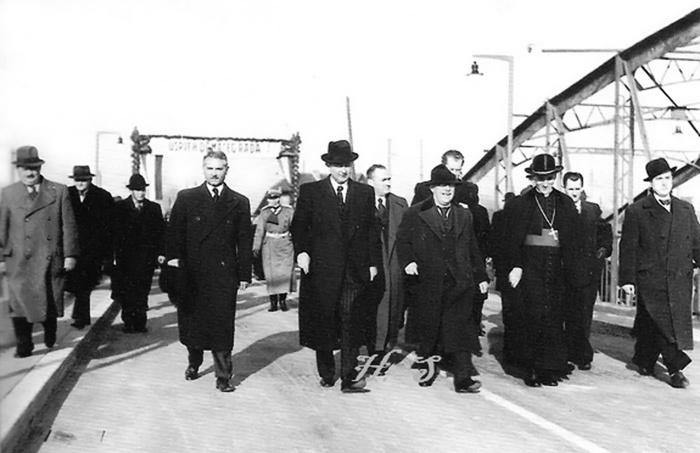
Croatian Ban Ivan Šubašić (with the Panama hat), HSS chairman Vladko Maček (middle) and Zagreb Archbishop Alojzije Stepinac opening the Sava Bridge in Zagreb, December 1939

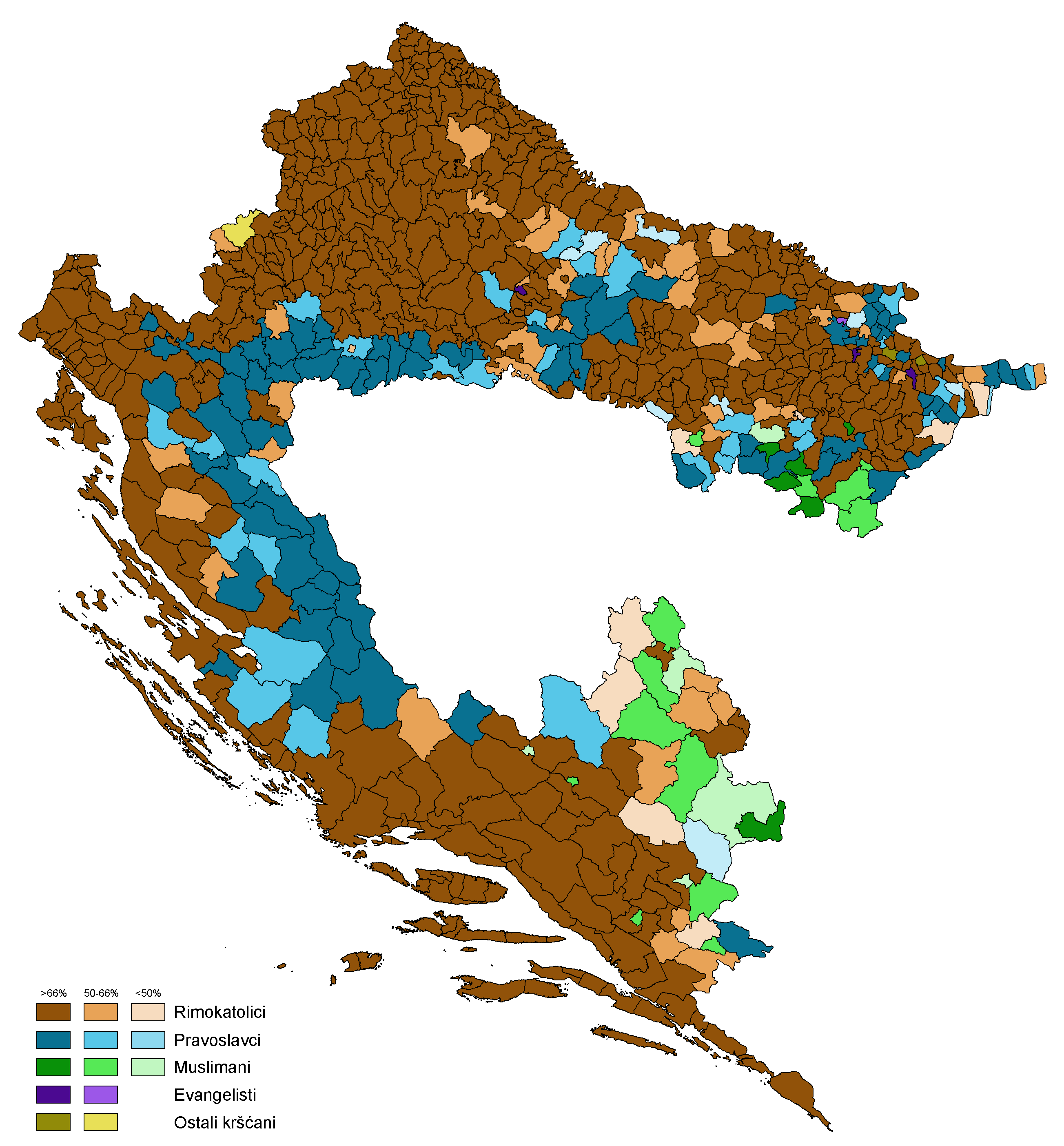
Religious map of the Banovina Croatia by municipality, according to the 1931 census. Orthodox (Serb)-majority municipalities were especially hotly contested among pro-HSS Serb party SDS (IDP), Yugoslav nationalist and anti-HSS JRZ (YRU), Communists, as well as various independent Serb lists opposing the Croatian autonomy.

Ban Šubašić visited less developed regions in Lika and Dalmatia in late 1939, promising public works on infrastructure. Secretary-general of the Croatian Peasant Party, Juraj Krnjević, toured Croatia, visiting municipal and district party organizations, trying to settle some disputes, unite fractions and revert splits in the party. For instance, the differences in opinion on certain appointments and on the issue of supporting the metal workers' strike in Slavonski Brod alienated the district party organisation from the national HSS leadership; as Brod HSS refused to toe the party line and split into many factions, the entire district organisation was dissolved in March 1940, despite the 37–6 vote of confidence in the Brod party chairman. In general, Krnjević tried to assuage dissidents and remind the party cadre of the importance of the elections. While he had some success in Dubrovnik, still, according to historian G. Jakovčev, there were as many as 70 lists by HSS dissidents in Dalmatia alone (e.g. Ston, Šipan, Makarska, etc.). Krnjević also tried to address the economic concerns, declaring at a rally in Split that Croatia has to be more equal and that HSS will not allow some to be millionaires while others are hungry. Maček tried to downplay the importance of the elections, going as far as saying that he does not attach "any political importance" to it, as many local and even personal particularities play a role in them. In a circular note to HSS organisations he reminded them to consider economic interests first when choosing candidates for councilmen and mayors. However, it was still important to eliminate anti-agreement forces (JRZ in particular) from positions of power in Croatia and show HSS and SDS' strength.

External image
- HSS secretary-general Krnjevic at a speech in 1939

Due to the royal Yugoslav regime's persecution and ban since the 1920 Obznana, Croatian communists had to run in the elections as the Party of the working people (Croatian Stranka radnog naroda, SRN). According to historian Sibe Kvesić, the gendarmerie and the local authorities frequently harassed the communists and their supporters, spreading rumours and threatening voters who intended to vote for the communists. In some places, the judicial or administrative authorities pressed hard to bar the SRN putting the candidates due to any petty mistakes.

Political opponents of Cvetković-Maček agreement and the establishment of Banovina of Croatia had different strategies for contesting the elections. Yugoslav people's party (JNS) in Croatia, chaired by Grga Andjelinović, chose not to contest the elections, while it advised party cadre and fractions under senator Petar Zec to still put up lists in some municipalities together with the Yugoslav radicals (JRZ) and other Serb parties. These were usually named "nonpartisan Serb lists." Serb nationalists claimed that the Banovina of Croatia was Maček's dictatorship and that only a unitary and centralised Kingdom of Yugoslavia could bring prosperity to Croatian Serbs. Some of them openly advocated secession of Serb-majority municipalities and counties from Banovina of Croatia and joining neighbouring, Serb-majority Vrbas Banovina. JRZ chairman, Yugoslav prime minister Cvetković, called Serbs of Croatia to cast their votes for JRZ as a show of support for unitary Yugoslavia.

On May 1, Croatian communists organised a mass strike in Zagreb to commemorate the International Workers' Day, claiming strike participation rate close to 90%. Communist activists and protests, predominantly students, blocked the tram depot and thus prevented the trams in Zagreb from operating the entire day. Tram workers' trade union joined them as well. Protesting workers clashed with the police and HSS paramilitary (Zaštita), resulting in numerous wounded and injured. This was the first time in Kingdom of Yugoslavia the workers decided to organize mass strikes and protests on May 1.

On May 17, just two days ahead of the elections, Ban Šubašić postponed indefinitely the elections in municipalities in Kastav, Čabar, Delnice, Sušak, Benkovac and Šibenik district. The Croatian government officially stated that it exempted them due to their proximity to the Adriatic military area surrounding important naval harbors. Namely, this operational zone was put under alert after the begin of the WWII due to its bordering Italy or being adjacent to Italian coast, as Yugoslavia was wary of an Italian attack. However, others suspected that the elections were not held there due to some of these municipalities being communist strongholds (such as Tisno, Zlarin and Vodice, where communists won in 1936) as an expected communist victory there would make HSS weaknesses very visible. At the same time, Ban Šubašić postponed the elections in Brčko and Gradačac district and Konavle municipality for May 26, and in Derventa district as well as Pazarište, Brestovsko, Kloštar Ivanić, Bosiljevo, Šamac and Cvetlin municipalities for 2 June.

== Voting ==
Only men older than 24 were allowed to vote. Voting was public; a voter had to loudly declare his name and the list he wanted to vote for. In many municipalities, the only list contesting the elections was the HSS one. In some municipalities (Andrijaševci, Retkovci, Opuzen, Gunja and Farkaševac), clashes between the voters and incidents occurred so the elections had to be repeated or postponed for a week. Elections were held in 620 municipalities on May 19, while some counties voted a week later or in June. After Šubašić's reshuffling prior to the local elections, the Banovina of Croatia had altogether 693 municipalities and 25 cities within 99 districts at the end of 1940. Two of those municipalities were created after the local elections were held.

Due to gerrymandering of municipal borders just before the elections, most notably in attaching JRZ-leaning Cavtat to HSS-leaning Gruda to form a new municipality (Konavle) south of Dubrovnik or Independent Democratic Party (SDS)-advocated border changes in Bosanska Posavina around Odžak, some Bosniaks and Serbs boycotted the elections there.

== Election results ==
The HSS-SDS coalition won a majority of municipalities and established full political control over the territory of the Banovina of Croatia. Preliminary results of the 19 May elections showed that the HSS alone won a majority in 425 municipalities, the SDK in 106, the SDS in 27, the HSS and the Muslim Organization of the HSS in 4, the HSS and Germans in 1, the Muslim Organization of the HSS in 2, the SDK with other groups in 1, and the SDS with other Serb parties in 1. The JRZ won a majority in 20 municipalities, the JRZ and Farmers in 1, joint Serb lists in 8, Serb non-partisan lists in 18, non-partisan city lists in 2, independent lists in 2, Farmers in 1, leftists in 1, Germans in 3, and ethnic minority lists in 2.

The election showed some weakening of support for the major political parties. After the local elections in 1936, HSS won majority in 512 out of 612 municipalities in Sava and Littoral banovina, roughly corresponding with the later-established Banovina of Croatia. In littoral banovina, in 1936 HSS won 75 out of 94 municipalities (80%).

The results were especially poor showing for Yugoslav radical union (JRZ), which won majority in 21 municipalities, compared to 108 they held power in before the elections. In 195 municipalities with absolute or relative Serb majority, out of 121,429 voters JRZ and independent Serb lists won 36,502 votes, SDS alone 15,183 while HSS-SDS coalition (SDK) won 44.262 votes. The JRZ lost most of its previously held municipalities to the SDK and the SDS.

The Communists won the majority in the councils of Sinj, Trogir, Komiža, and Vrboska (2/3 majority), a third of votes in Omiš, and a quarter in Makarska in Dalmatia. In Vrgorac, communists came second and won 8 seats in the council, while in Smiljan they lost by 4 votes in repeated elections, also winning 8 seats in the council.

Independent German ethnic lists won majority in 5 municipalities. Ethnic Germans ran on other lists, too, mostly on HSS tickets. Joint HSS-German list won in one municipality. Altogether, ethnic Croatian Germans won 177 mandates in 45 municipalities.

Elections in 20 municipalities were held on 26 May, and in 13 municipalities on 2 June. On 5 June, the Government published the corrected results for some municipalities.

=== Turnout ===
As the 1936 local elections were used by the HSS-led Croatian opposition to wrestle some self-government from the central Yugoslav authorities, the turnout stood at around 80%. The turnout in 1940 was significantly lower in many areas, partially reflecting the dissatisfaction and the lack of interest of the population. In Osijek district as a whole, the turnout was 50.89% (4,708 voted out of 9,250), in Drniš it was 52.11%, while In Daruvar district the turnout was 48% (4,076 voted). At some parts of Daruvar area it was as low as 21%. As the communists were administratively barred from contesting the elections in Vis, many chose to abstain in protest, bringing the turnout to 50%. On the other hand, Royal Yugoslav Armed forces mobilized many men fit for military service in its 1939/40 mobilization.

=== Summary ===
Results of the election based on the majority of mandates in each municipality.: HSS; SDK; SDS; HSS coalitions SDS coalitions German lists Muslim lists Minority lists Farmers / Non-partisan Serb lists United Serb lists United Muslim and Serb list JRZ; JRZ and Farmers; Davidović group SRN; LSRS; Elections not held

Mandates (19 May)

Political party	Abbr.	Mandates	%
Croatian Peasant Party	HSS	9,385	71.77%
Peasant-Democratic Coalition	SDK	1,708	13.06%
Independent Democratic Party	SDS	767	5.87%
Croatian Peasant Party and Muslims		149	1.14%
Yugoslav Radical Union	JRZ	489	3.74%
Serb independent lists		262	2%
Other lists		262	2%
Workers' lists (communists)		54	0.41%
Total		13,076	

Overall municipalities

Political parties and coalitions		Abbr.	Municipalities	%
Croatian Peasant Party and Independent Democratic Party	Croatian Peasant Party	HSS	446	67.78%
Croatian Peasant Party and Independent Democratic Party	Peasant-Democratic Coalition	SDK	104	15.81%
Croatian Peasant Party and Independent Democratic Party	Independent Democratic Party	SDS	26	3.95%
Croatian Peasant Party and Independent Democratic Party	Croatian Peasant Party and Muslims		6	0.91%
Croatian Peasant Party and Independent Democratic Party	Other coalitions		6	0.91%
Serb independent lists	Non-partisan Serb lists		25	3.80%
Serb independent lists	United Serb lists		8	1.22%
Serb independent lists	United Muslim and Serb list		1	0.15%
Yugoslav Radical Union	Yugoslav Radical Union	JRZ	21	3.19%
Yugoslav Radical Union	Yugoslav Radical Union and Farmers		1	0.15%
Workers' lists (communists)	Party of the Working People	SRN	3	0.46%
Workers' lists (communists)	Union of Workers and Peasants	LSRS	1	0.15%
	German ethnic lists		4	0.61%
	Other lists		6	0.91%
Total			658	

Municipality totals
HSS-SDS Coalition	89.4%
Serb independent lists	5.2%
JRZ	3.3%
Communists	0.6%
German lists	0.6%
Other	0.9%

=== Municipalities ===
District	Municipality	Party
Benkovac	Benkovac	Elections not held
Benkovac	Kistanje	Elections not held
Benkovac	Novigrad	Elections not held
Benkovac	Obrovac	Elections not held
Benkovac	Ravni Kotari	Elections not held
Benkovac	Stankovci	Elections not held
Biograd	Biograd	HSS
Biograd	Nin	HSS
Biograd	Zemunik	HSS
Bjelovar	Bjelovar	SDK
Bjelovar	Farkaševac	SDK
Bjelovar	Gudovac	SDK
Bjelovar	Ivanska	HSS
Bjelovar	Kapela	HSS
Bjelovar	Nova Rača	SDK
Bjelovar	Predavac	SDK
Bjelovar	Prespa	SDK
Bjelovar	Severin	HSS
Bjelovar	Trojstvo	SDK
Bjelovar	Velika Pisanica	HSS
Bjelovar	Zrinski Topolovac	Elections not held
Brač	Bol	HSS
Brač	Milna	HSS
Brač	Nerežišća	HSS
Brač	Postira	HSS
Brač	Pučišća	HSS
Brač	Selca	HSS
Brač	Supetar	HSS
Brač	Sutivan	SDK
Brčko	Bosanski Šamac	HSS and Farmers
Brčko	Brčko	HSS
Brčko	Brezovo Polje	Davidović group
Brčko	Bukvik	HSS
Brčko	Čelić	HSS and Muslims
Brčko	Donja Mahala	HSS
Brčko	Gornji Rahić	HSS
Brčko	Obudovac	Non-partisan Serb list
Brčko	Tramošnjica	HSS and Farmers
Brinje	Brinje	SDK
Brinje	Jezerane	HSS
Brod	Andrijevci	HSS
Brod	Bebrina	HSS
Brod	Beravci	HSS
Brod	Brodski Drenovac	HSS
Brod	Brodski Stupnik	HSS
Brod	Brodski Varoš	HSS
Brod	Garčin	HSS
Brod	Kaniža	HSS
Brod	Klakar	HSS
Brod	Kobaš	SDK
Brod	Lužani	SDK
Brod	Oriovac	HSS
Brod	Podcrkavlje	HSS
Brod	Podvinj	HSS
Brod	Sibinj	HSS
Brod	Slavonski Brod	Elections not held
Brod	Svilaj	HSS
Brod	Trnjani	SDK
Brod	Velika Kopanica	HSS
Bugojno	Bugojno	SDK
Bugojno	Gornji Vakuf	SDK
Bugojno	Kupres	Non-partisan Serb list
Crikvenica	Crikvenica	HSS
Crikvenica	Drivenik	HSS
Crikvenica	Grižane-Belgrad	HSS
Crikvenica	Selce	HSS
Crikvenica	Sveti Jakov Šiljevica	HSS
Čabar	Čabar	Elections not held
Čabar	Draga	Elections not held
Čabar	Gerovo	Elections not held
Čabar	Osilnica	Elections not held
Čabar	Plešce	Elections not held
Čabar	Prezid	Elections not held
Čakovec	Belica	HSS
Čakovec	Čakovec	Elections not held
Čakovec	Čakovec-Okolica	HSS
Čakovec	Gornji Mihaljevec	HSS
Čakovec	Macinec	HSS
Čakovec	Mursko Središće	HSS
Čakovec	Nedelišće	HSS
Čakovec	Podturen	HSS
Čakovec	Strahoninec	HSS
Čakovec	Sveti Juraj na Bregu	HSS
Čakovec	Sveti Martin na Muri	HSS
Čakovec	Vratišinec	HSS
Čazma	Čazma	HSS
Čazma	Dubrava	HSS
Čazma	Ivanić-Grad	HSS
Čazma	Kloštar Ivanić	HSS
Čazma	Križ	HSS
Čazma	Štefanje	HSS
Daruvar	Bijela	Non-partisan Serb list
Daruvar	Daruvar	HSS
Daruvar	Daruvarski Brestovac	HSS
Daruvar	Dežanovac	SDK
Daruvar	Đulaves (Miokovićevo)	SDK
Daruvar	Končanica	HSS
Daruvar	Sirač	HSS
Daruvar	Uljanik	HSS
Daruvar	Vanjski Daruvar	United Serb list
Daruvar	Veliki Bastaji	United Serb list
Delnice	Brod na Kupi	Elections not held
Delnice	Brod-Moravice	Elections not held
Delnice	Crni Lug	Elections not held
Delnice	Delnice	Elections not held
Delnice	Fužine	Elections not held
Delnice	Lič	Elections not held
Delnice	Lokve	Elections not held
Delnice	Mrkopalj	Elections not held
Delnice	Skrad	Elections not held
Derventa	Bosanski Brod	HSS
Derventa	Bosanski Kobaš	United Muslim and Serb list
Derventa	Derventa	HSS
Derventa	Derventa-selo	HSS
Derventa	Lužani Mulabegovi	HSS
Derventa	Osinja	Farmers
Derventa	Plehan	HSS
Derventa	Podnovlje	Non-partisan Serb list
Donja Stubica	Bistra	HSS
Donja Stubica	Donja Stubica	HSS
Donja Stubica	Gornja Stubica	HSS
Donja Stubica	Marija Bistrica	HSS
Donja Stubica	Oroslavje	HSS
Donji Lapac	Donji Lapac	SDK
Donji Lapac	Srb	Non-partisan Serb list
Donji Miholjac	Čađavica	HSS
Donji Miholjac	Donji Miholjac	HSS
Donji Miholjac	Marijanci	HSS
Donji Miholjac	Podravska Moslavina	HSS
Donji Miholjac	Podravski Podgajci	HSS
Donji Miholjac	Šljivoševci	SDK
Donji Miholjac	Viljevo	SDK
Dubrovnik	Cavtat (Konavlje)	HSS
Dubrovnik	Dubrovnik	Elections not held
Dubrovnik	Janjina	HSS
Dubrovnik	Kuna	HSS
Dubrovnik	Lopud	HSS
Dubrovnik	Mljet	HSS
Dubrovnik	Pelješac (Orebić)	HSS
Dubrovnik	Slano	HSS
Dubrovnik	Ston	HSS
Dubrovnik	Šipan	HSS
Dubrovnik	Trpanj	HSS
Dubrovnik	Zaton (Orašac)	HSS
Dugo Selo	Brckovljani	HSS
Dugo Selo	Dugo Selo	HSS
Dugo Selo	Lupoglav	HSS
Dugo Selo	Oborovo	HSS
Dugo Selo	Posavski Bregi	HSS
Duvno	Grabovica	HSS
Duvno	Tomislavgrad	HSS
Duvno	Vir	HSS
Đakovo	Bračevci	SDK
Đakovo	Budrovci	HSS
Đakovo	Drenje	HSS
Đakovo	Đakovo	HSS
Đakovo	Gašinci	HSS
Đakovo	Gorjani	HSS
Đakovo	Krndija	German ethnic list
Đakovo	Levanjska Varoš	SDK
Đakovo	Piškorevci	HSS
Đakovo	Punitovci	HSS
Đakovo	Satnica Đakovačka	HSS
Đakovo	Selci Đakovački	HSS
Đakovo	Semeljci	HSS
Đakovo	Striživojna	HSS
Đakovo	Trnava	HSS
Đakovo	Viškovci	HSS
Đakovo	Vrbica	HSS
Đakovo	Vrpolje	HSS
Đakovo	Vuka	HSS
Đurđevac	Đurđevac	HSS
Đurđevac	Ferdinandovac (Jelačićevo)	HSS
Đurđevac	Kalinovac	HSS
Đurđevac	Kloštar	HSS
Đurđevac	Molve	HSS
Đurđevac	Pitomača	HSS
Đurđevac	Podravske Sesvete	HSS
Đurđevac	Šemovci	HSS
Đurđevac	Virje	HSS
Fojnica	Brestovsko	HSS and Muslims
Fojnica	Busovača	HSS
Fojnica	Fojnica	HSS
Fojnica	Kiseljak	HSS
Fojnica	Kreševo	HSS
Garešnica	Berek	SDK
Garešnica	Garešnica	SDK
Garešnica	Hercegovac	HSS
Garešnica	Hrastovac	German ethnic list
Garešnica	Veliki Zdenci	SDK
Garešnica	Vukovje	SDK
Glina	Banski Grabovac	JRZ
Glina	Bučica	HSS
Glina	Glina	SDK
Glina	Jukinac	SDK
Glina	Klasnić	JRZ
Glina	Kraljevčani	United Serb list
Glina	Maja	JRZ
Glina	Mali Gradac	JRZ
Glina	Stankovac	HSS
Gospić	Gospić	SDK
Gospić	Karlobag	HSS
Gospić	Lički Osik	HSS
Gospić	Medak	Non-partisan Serb list
Gospić	Smiljan	HSS
Gračac	Bruvno	SDK
Gračac	Gračac	SDK
Gračac	Lovinac	HSS
Gračac	Mazin	Non-partisan Serb list
Gračac	Zrmanja	JRZ
Gradačac	Gradačac	HSS
Gradačac	Modriča	HSS
Gradačac	Odžak	HSS
Gradačac	Srnice	Muslims and SDS
Gradačac	Vranjak	Non-partisan Serb list
Grubišno Polje	Grubišno Polje	SDK
Grubišno Polje	Ivanovo Selo	SDK
Grubišno Polje	Veliki Grđevac	SDK
Hvar	Bogomolje	HSS
Hvar	Hvar	HSS
Hvar	Jelsa	HSS
Hvar	Komiža	SRN
Hvar	Stari Grad	HSS
Hvar	Sućuraj	HSS
Hvar	Vis	HSS
Hvar	Vrboska	SRN
Ilok	Banoštar	SDS
Ilok	Beočin	JRZ
Ilok	Bingula	SDS
Ilok	Čerević	SDK
Ilok	Erdevik	SDK and other parties
Ilok	Ilok	HSS
Ilok	Mohovo	SDS
Ilok	Molovin	SDS
Ilok	Neštin	SDK
Ilok	Sot	HSS
Ilok	Susek	SDS
Ilok	Šarengrad	HSS
Imotski	Imotski	HSS
Ivanec	Bednja	HSS
Ivanec	Cvetlin	HSS
Ivanec	Ivanec	HSS
Ivanec	Lepoglava	HSS
Ivanec	Maruševec	HSS
Ivanec	Višnjica	HSS
Jastrebarsko	Cvetković	HSS
Jastrebarsko	Gornji Desinec	HSS
Jastrebarsko	Jastrebarsko	HSS
Jastrebarsko	Kalje	HSS
Jastrebarsko	Klinča Sela	HSS
Jastrebarsko	Krašić	HSS
Jastrebarsko	Petrovina	HSS
Jastrebarsko	Sošice	HSS
Jastrebarsko	Sveta Jana	HSS
Jastrebarsko	Vivodina	HSS
Karlovac	Barilović	SDK
Karlovac	Draganići	HSS
Karlovac	Duga Resa	HSS
Karlovac	Jaškovo	HSS
Karlovac	Karlovac	Elections not held
Karlovac	Netretić	HSS
Karlovac	Ozalj	HSS
Karlovac	Rečica	HSS
Karlovac	Ribnik	HSS
Karlovac	Šišljavić	HSS
Kastav	Kastav	Elections not held
Klanjec	Dubravica	HSS
Klanjec	Klanjec	HSS
Klanjec	Kraljevec	HSS
Klanjec	Luka	HSS
Klanjec	Tuhelj	HSS
Klanjec	Veliko Trgovišće	HSS
Klanjec	Zagorska Sela	HSS
Knin	Drniš	HSS
Knin	Knin	Non-partisan Serb list
Knin	Promina	HSS
Konjic	Konjic	JRZ
Konjic	Ostrožac	JRZ
Koprivnica	Drnje	HSS
Koprivnica	Đelekovec	HSS
Koprivnica	Gola	HSS
Koprivnica	Hlebine	HSS
Koprivnica	Koprivnica	Elections not held
Koprivnica	Koprivnički Ivanec	HSS
Koprivnica	Legrad	HSS
Koprivnica	Novigrad Podravski	SDK
Koprivnica	Peteranec	HSS
Koprivnica	Sokolovac	HSS
Koprivnica	Ždala	HSS
Korčula	Blato	HSS
Korčula	Korčula	HSS
Korčula	Vela Luka	HSS
Korenica	Bunić	SDK
Korenica	Korenica	Non-partisan Serb list
Korenica	Plitvička Jezera	SDK
Kostajnica	Bobovac	HSS
Kostajnica	Crkveni Bok	SDS
Kostajnica	Dubica	United Serb list
Kostajnica	Kostajnica	SDK
Kostajnica	Majur	SDK
Kostajnica	Mečenčani	Non-partisan Serb list
Kostajnica	Staza	SDK
Krapina	Đurmanec	HSS
Krapina	Krapina	HSS
Krapina	Petrovsko	HSS
Krapina	Radoboj	HSS
Krapina	Zabok	HSS
Krapina	Začretje	HSS
Križevci	Gradec	HSS
Križevci	Križevci	Elections not held
Križevci	Raven	HSS
Križevci	Sveti Ivan Žabno	SDK
Križevci	Sveti Petar Čvrstec	HSS
Križevci	Sveti Petar Orehovec	HSS
Križevci	Vojakovac	SDK
Križevci	Vrbovec	HSS
Krk	Aleksandrovo (Punat)	HSS
Krk	Baška	HSS
Krk	Dobrinj	HSS
Krk	Dubašnica	HSS
Krk	Krk	HSS
Krk	Omišalj	HSS
Krk	Vrbnik	HSS
Kutina	Kutina	HSS
Kutina	Ludina	HSS
Kutina	Popovača	HSS
Livno	Donje Polje	Non-partisan Serb list
Livno	Gornje Polje	HSS
Livno	Livno	Elections not held
Livno	Priluka	HSS
Livno	Šujica	HSS
Ludbreg	Ludbreg	SDK
Ludbreg	Mali Bukovec	HSS
Ludbreg	Martijanec	HSS
Ludbreg	Rasinja	HSS
Ludbreg	Vanjski Ludbreg	HSS
Ljubuški	Drinovci	HSS
Ljubuški	Humac	HSS
Ljubuški	Ljubuški	Muslim list
Ljubuški	Posušje	HSS
Ljubuški	Vitina	HSS
Ljubuški	Zvirovići	HSS
Makarska	Gornje Primorje (Gradac)	HSS
Makarska	Makarska	SDK
Makarska	Vrgorac	HSS
Metković	Metković	HSS
Metković	Opuzen	HSS
Mostar	Bijelo Polje	HSS and Muslims
Mostar	Blagaj	HSS and Muslims
Mostar	Donje Brotnjo	HSS
Mostar	Drežnica	HSS
Mostar	Gornje Brotnjo	HSS
Mostar	Kočerin	HSS
Mostar	Mostar	HSS
Mostar	Mostar, grad	Elections not held
Mostar	Mostarsko Blato	HSS
Mostar	Široki Brijeg	HSS
Mostar	Žitomislić	HSS
Našice	Budimci	JRZ and Farmers
Našice	Čačinci	HSS
Našice	Đurđenovac	SDK
Našice	Feričanci	SDK
Našice	Klokočevci	SDK
Našice	Koška	HSS
Našice	Našice	SDK
Našice	Obradovci (Slavonske Bare)	SDK
Našice	Orahovica	SDK
Našice	Podgorač	SDK
Našice	Vanjske Našice	SDK
Našice	Zdenci	HSS
Nova Gradiška	Cernik	SDK
Nova Gradiška	Davor	HSS
Nova Gradiška	Nova Gradiška	Elections not held
Nova Gradiška	Nova Kapela	HSS
Nova Gradiška	Orubica	HSS
Nova Gradiška	Rešetari	HSS
Nova Gradiška	Staro Petrovo Selo	HSS
Nova Gradiška	Štivica	HSS
Nova Gradiška	Vanjska Nova Gradiška	HSS
Novi	Bribir	HSS
Novi	Ledenice	HSS
Novi	Novi	HSS
Novi Marof	Breznički Hum	HSS
Novi Marof	Gornja Rijeka	HSS
Novi Marof	Ljubešćica	HSS
Novi Marof	Novi Marof	HSS
Novi Marof	Vanjske Varaždinske Toplice	HSS
Novi Marof	Varaždinske Toplice	HSS
Novska	Banova Jaruga	HSS
Novska	Jasenovac	SDK
Novska	Krapje	HSS
Novska	Lipovljani	HSS
Novska	Lonja	HSS
Novska	Međurić	HSS
Novska	Novska	SDK
Novska	Vanjska Novska	SDK
Ogulin	Drežnica	SDS
Ogulin	Generalski Stol	HSS
Ogulin	Gomirje	Non-partisan Serb list
Ogulin	Gornje Dubrave	SDS
Ogulin	Josipdol	SDK
Ogulin	Modruš	HSS
Ogulin	Ogulin	SDK
Ogulin	Oštarije	SDK
Ogulin	Plaški	SDS
Ogulin	Tounj	HSS
Okučani	Dragalić	HSS
Okučani	Mašić (Medari)	SDK
Okučani	Okučani	United Serb list
Okučani	Rajić	SDK
Okučani	Stara Gradiška	HSS
Osijek	Aljmaš	HSS
Osijek	Bijelo Brdo	SDS
Osijek	Čepin	HSS
Osijek	Dalj	SDK
Osijek	Erdut	HSS
Osijek	Ernestinovo	HSS
Osijek	Hrastin	SDK
Osijek	Jovanovac	HSS
Osijek	Laslovo	HSS
Osijek	Osijek	Elections not held
Osijek	Retfala	HSS
Osijek	Sarvaš	HSS
Osijek	Tenja	JRZ
Otočac	Brlog	HSS
Otočac	Dabar	SDK
Otočac	Otočac	HSS
Otočac	Sinac	HSS
Otočac	Škare	Non-partisan Serb list
Otočac	Vrhovine	Non-partisan Serb list
Pakrac	Antunovac	HSS
Pakrac	Badljevina	SDK
Pakrac	Bučje	SDS
Pakrac	Čaglić	JRZ
Pakrac	Dragović	Non-partisan Serb list
Pakrac	Gaj	SDK
Pakrac	Kukunjevac	SDK
Pakrac	Lipik	HSS
Pakrac	Pakrac	SDK
Pakrac	Poljana	HSS
Perušić	Kosinj	SDK
Perušić	Pazarište	HSS
Perušić	Perušić	SDK
Petrinja	Blinja	SDK
Petrinja	Gora	SDK
Petrinja	Gradusa	SDS
Petrinja	Hrastovica	HSS
Petrinja	Jabukovac	SDK
Petrinja	Mošćenica	HSS
Petrinja	Petrinja	Elections not held
Petrinja	Sunja	SDK
Pisarovina	Donja Kupčina	HSS
Pisarovina	Kupinec	HSS
Pisarovina	Lasinja	SDS and other Serb parties
Pisarovina	Pisarovina	HSS
Pisarovina	Pokupsko	HSS
Požega	Bekteže	SDK
Požega	Jakšić	SDK
Požega	Kaptol	HSS
Požega	Kutjevo	HSS
Požega	Mihaljevci	HSS
Požega	Pleternica	HSS
Požega	Požega	Elections not held
Požega	Požeški Brestovac	SDK
Požega	Ruševo	SDK
Požega	Stražeman	SDK
Požega	Vanjska Požega	SDK
Požega	Velika	HSS
Požega	Vilić-Selo	SDK
Pregrada	Desinić	HSS
Pregrada	Hum na Sutli	HSS
Pregrada	Krapinske Toplice	HSS
Pregrada	Pregrada	HSS
Preko	Božava	HSS
Preko	Preko	HSS
Preko	Sali	HSS
Preko	Silba	HSS
Preko	Veli Iž	HSS
Prelog	Dekanovec	HSS
Prelog	Donja Dubrava	HSS
Prelog	Donji Kraljevec	HSS
Prelog	Donji Vidovec	HSS
Prelog	Draškovec	HSS
Prelog	Goričan	HSS
Prelog	Hodošan	HSS
Prelog	Kotoriba	HSS
Prelog	Mala Subotica	HSS
Prelog	Prelog	HSS
Prelog	Sveta Marija na Muri	HSS
Prelog	Sveti Juraj u Trnju	HSS
Prozor	Gornja Rama	HSS
Prozor	Prozor	HSS
Rab	Novalja	HSS
Rab	Pag	HSS
Rab	Rab	HSS
Samobor	Podvrh	HSS
Samobor	Samobor	HSS
Samobor	Sveta Nedelja	HSS
Samobor	Sveti Martin pod Okićem	HSS
Senj	Jablanac	HSS
Senj	Krivi Put	HSS
Senj	Senj	Elections not held
Senj	Sveti Juraj	HSS
Sinj	Sinj	SRN
Sinj	Trilj	HSS
Sinj	Vrlika	SDK
Sisak	Gušće	HSS
Sisak	Kratečko	HSS
Sisak	Lekenik	HSS
Sisak	Letovanić	HSS
Sisak	Martinska Ves	HSS
Sisak	Palanjek	HSS
Sisak	Sela	HSS
Sisak	Sisak	Elections not held
Sisak	Topolovac	HSS
Slatina	Čeralije	SDK
Slatina	Gornji Miholjac	SDK
Slatina	Nova Bukovica	SDK
Slatina	Podravska Slatina	SDK
Slatina	Slatinski Drenovac	SDS
Slatina	Sopje	SDK
Slatina	Voćin	SDK
Slunj	Cetingrad	SDK
Slunj	Drežnik	SDK
Slunj	Primišlje	SDS
Slunj	Rakovica	Non-partisan Serb list
Slunj	Slunj	HSS
Slunj	Veljun	Non-partisan Serb list
Split	Donja Kaštela	HSS
Split	Kaštel Lukšić	HSS
Split	Kaštel Sućurac	HSS
Split	Klis	HSS
Split	Krajina (Šestanovac)	HSS
Split	Lećevica	HSS
Split	Muć	HSS
Split	Omiš	HSS
Split	Poljica	HSS
Split	Split	Elections not held
Split	Šolta	HSS
Split	Trogir	LSRS
Stolac	Aladinići	HSS and Muslims
Stolac	Berkovići	Non-partisan Serb list
Stolac	Burmazi	HSS
Stolac	Čapljina	HSS
Stolac	Hutovo	HSS
Stolac	Stolac	HSS and Muslims
Sušak	Bakar	Elections not held
Sušak	Cernik-Čavle	Elections not held
Sušak	Dol-Bakarac	Elections not held
Sušak	Grobnik	Elections not held
Sušak	Hreljin	Elections not held
Sušak	Jelenje	Elections not held
Sušak	Kraljevica	Elections not held
Sušak	Krasica	Elections not held
Sušak	Sušak	Elections not held
Sveti Ivan Zelina	Donja Zelina	HSS
Sveti Ivan Zelina	Kašina	HSS
Sveti Ivan Zelina	Moravče Belovar	HSS
Sveti Ivan Zelina	Sveti Ivan Zelina	HSS
Sveti Ivan Zelina	Vanjski Sveti Ivan Zelina	HSS
Šibenik	Skradin	Elections not held
Šibenik	Šibenik	Elections not held
Šibenik	Tijesno	Elections not held
Šibenik	Vodice	Elections not held
Šibenik	Zlarin	Elections not held
Šid	Adaševci	JRZ
Šid	Bačinci	SDK
Šid	Bapska Novak	HSS
Šid	Batrovci	JRZ
Šid	Berkasovo	JRZ
Šid	Gibarac	HSS
Šid	Ilača	HSS
Šid	Ilinci	JRZ
Šid	Jamena	JRZ
Šid	Kukujevci	HSS
Šid	Lipovac	HSS
Šid	Mala Vašica	JRZ
Šid	Morović	JRZ
Šid	Strošinci	HSS
Šid	Šid	United Serb list
Šid	Šidski Banovci	German ethnic list
Šid	Tovarnik	HSS
Travnik	Bila	HSS
Travnik	Bučići	HSS
Travnik	Travnik	Elections not held
Travnik	Turbe	HSS
Travnik	Vitez	HSS
Udbina	Podlapac	SDK
Udbina	Udbina	Non-partisan Serb list
Valpovo	Belišće	HSS
Valpovo	Bizovac	HSS
Valpovo	Brođanci	HSS
Valpovo	Ladimirevci	HSS
Valpovo	Petrijevci	HSS
Valpovo	Valpovo	HSS
Valpovo	Vanjsko Valpovo	HSS
Varaždin	Bartolovec	HSS
Varaždin	Biškupec	HSS
Varaždin	Jalžabet	HSS
Varaždin	Križovljan Cestica	HSS
Varaždin	Petrijanec	HSS
Varaždin	Varaždin	Elections not held
Varaždin	Vidovec	HSS
Varaždin	Vinica	HSS
Velika Gorica	Dubranec	HSS
Velika Gorica	Kravarsko	HSS
Velika Gorica	Novo Čiče	HSS
Velika Gorica	Odra	HSS
Velika Gorica	Orle	HSS
Velika Gorica	Velika Gorica	HSS
Velika Gorica	Vukovina	HSS
Vinkovci	Andrijaševci	HSS
Vinkovci	Cerna	HSS
Vinkovci	Donje Novo Selo	HSS
Vinkovci	Ivankovo	HSS
Vinkovci	Jarmina	List of ethnic minorities
Vinkovci	Komletinci	HSS
Vinkovci	Laze	Farmers
Vinkovci	Mirkovci	Non-partisan Serb list
Vinkovci	Nijemci	HSS
Vinkovci	Novi Jankovci	Non-partisan Serb list
Vinkovci	Novo Selo	German ethnic list
Vinkovci	Orolik	HSS and Germans
Vinkovci	Otok	HSS
Vinkovci	Privlaka	HSS
Vinkovci	Retkovci	HSS
Vinkovci	Slakovci	HSS
Vinkovci	Stari Jankovci	List of ethnic minorities
Vinkovci	Stari Mikanovci	HSS
Vinkovci	Vinkovci	Elections not held
Vinkovci	Vođinci	HSS
Virovitica	Cabuna	SDK
Virovitica	Gradina	SDK
Virovitica	Lukač	SDK
Virovitica	Pivnica	SDK
Virovitica	Suhopolje	SDK
Virovitica	Špišić Bukovica	HSS
Virovitica	Virovitica	Elections not held
Vojnić	Krnjak	JRZ
Vojnić	Krstinja	SDS
Vojnić	Perjasica	SDS
Vojnić	Tušilović	JRZ
Vojnić	Vojnić	SDS
Vojnić	Vukmanić	SDK
Vrbovsko	Bosiljevo	HSS
Vrbovsko	Ravna Gora	HSS
Vrbovsko	Severin na Kupi	HSS
Vrbovsko	Srpske Moravice	SDS
Vrbovsko	Vrbovsko	HSS
Vrginmost	Bović	Non-partisan Serb list
Vrginmost	Čemernica	SDS
Vrginmost	Topusko	SDK
Vrginmost	Vrginmost	JRZ
Vukovar	Antin	HSS
Vukovar	Berak	HSS
Vukovar	Bobota	SDS
Vukovar	Bogdanovci	HSS
Vukovar	Borovo	Non-partisan Serb list
Vukovar	Bršadin	JRZ
Vukovar	Cerić	HSS
Vukovar	Čakovci	SDK
Vukovar	Gaboš	United Serb list
Vukovar	Korog	SDK
Vukovar	Lovas	HSS
Vukovar	Marinci	United Serb list
Vukovar	Markušica	SDS
Vukovar	Mikluševci	SDK
Vukovar	Negoslavci	SDS
Vukovar	Nuštar	HSS
Vukovar	Opatovac	HSS
Vukovar	Ostrovo	Non-partisan Serb list
Vukovar	Pačetin	SDS
Vukovar	Petrovci	SDS
Vukovar	Sotin	HSS
Vukovar	Svinjarevci	HSS
Vukovar	Tompojevci	HSS
Vukovar	Tordinci	HSS
Vukovar	Trpinja	SDS
Vukovar	Vera	SDS
Vukovar	Vukovar	Elections not held
Zagreb	Brdovec	HSS
Zagreb	Brezovica	HSS
Zagreb	Gračani (Remete)	HSS
Zagreb	Kustošija	HSS
Zagreb	Markuševec	HSS
Zagreb	Pušća	HSS
Zagreb	Sesvete	HSS
Zagreb	Stenjevec	HSS
Zagreb	Stupnik	HSS
Zagreb	Sveta Klara	HSS
Zagreb	Šestine	HSS
Zagreb	Vrapče	HSS
Zagreb	Zagreb	Elections not held
Zagreb	Zaprešić	HSS
Zlatar	Bedekovčina	HSS
Zlatar	Budinšćina	HSS
Zlatar	Hrašćina Trgovišće	HSS
Zlatar	Lobor	HSS
Zlatar	Mače	HSS
Zlatar	Mihovljan	HSS
Zlatar	Zlatar	HSS
Županja	Babina Greda	HSS
Županja	Bošnjaci	HSS
Županja	Drenovci	HSS
Županja	Gradište	HSS
Županja	Gundinci	HSS
Županja	Gunja	HSS
Županja	Posavski Podgajci	HSS
Županja	Račinovci	HSS
Županja	Rajevo Selo	HSS
Županja	Sikirevci	HSS
Županja	Soljani	HSS
Županja	Šamac	HSS
Županja	Štitar	HSS
Županja	Vrbanja	HSS
Županja	Županja	HSS

== Aftermath ==
Elected municipal council members met after the elections to constitute the council and elect the municipality mayor among themselves. Communist council members in Trogir and Vis refused to take an oath of loyalty to the king and consequently had their mandates made void. According to Jakovčev, 60 municipalities in Dalmatia alone protested due to forgeries and irregularities. In Vrboska, one of the few municipalities that were won by communists, elections were declared void by the government and then repeated on July 28. Busing in voters from Dol and elsewhere and intimidating the communists, HSS managed to secure the majority. Workers' list with Pero Nagulic on the ticket lost to the HSS list headed by Mihovil Stojsic.

In Knin, where the Serb nationalist non-partisan list under dr. Niko Novaković got 27 out of 36 councilmen, Croatian government dissolved the Knin town council and appointed secretary of the local HSS, Vice Musić, as the mayor.

In Bobota, all municipal councilmen elected on non-partisan Serb list decided to join SDS, disappointed by the election results in eastern Slavonia.

Maček declared the elections as a "90% victory for the pro-agreement parties", emphasizing that "the SDS won the majority among Croatian Serbs". He touted the results as a "lesson" for anti-agreement parties. Shortly after the elections, having in mind the incidents that occurred, ban Šubašić indefinitely banned all public gatherings, rallies or protests except for religious events.

== Literature ==
- Konjević, Mile (1973). "Općinski izbori u Banovini Hrvatskoj 19. maja 1940. godine", Prilozi Instituta za istoriju Sarajevo 9(1)
- Miličević, Tomislav (2014). "Dr. Juraj Krnjević: političko djelovanje od 1929. do 1941". darhiv.ffzg.unizg.hr (in Croatian).
- Boban, Ljubo. "Previranja na selu u Banovini Hrvatskoj", Istorija XX veka, II., Beograd, 1961.
- Kolar-Dimitrijević, Mira (1976). "Utjecaj fašizma na ekonomsko-socijalnu politiku Hrvatske do travnja 1941. godine", Zbornik fašizam i neofašizam, CDD, Zagreb, 221.-233.
- Jelić-Butić, Fikreta. Prilog proučavanju djelatnosti ustaša do 1941. godine
- IŠEK, Tomislav (1991.). Hrvatska seljačka stranka u Bosni i Hercegovini 1929. -1941., Sarajevo: Institut za istoriju, 1991.
- Boban, Ljubo (1974) Maček i politika HSS-a od 1928. do 1941., Zagreb, Liber, knjiga I. II.
