= Otkopi =

Otkopi Otkopy (Czech)
- Village
- Location within Croatia
- Coordinates: 45.6565321°N 17.1523251°E
- Country: Croatia
- County: Bjelovar-Bilogora County
- Municipality: Končanica

Area
  - Total: 0.89 sq mi (2.3 km^{2})

Population (2021)
  - Total: 57
  - Density: 64/sq mi (25/km^{2})
- Time zone: UTC+1 (CET)
  - Summer (DST): UTC+2 (CEST)

Otkopi (Czech: Otkopy) is a village in Croatia.

== Demographics ==
According to the 2021 census, its population was 57.

=== Official usage of Czech minority language ===
The Municipality of Končanice has officially introduced the Czech language as an equal co-official language alongside the Croatian. Full equal use of the Czech language is prescribed in the village of Otkopi. In this settlement, bilingual signage for places and traffic signs is ensured, and legal and physical persons operating or registered in Otkopi and engaged in public activities are ensured to follow bilingualism.
