= Brestovačka Brda =

- Village
- Location within Croatia
- Coordinates: 45.6000851°N 17.1074767°E
- Country: Croatia
- County: Bjelovar-Bilogora County
- Municipality: Končanica

Area
  - Total: 2.2 sq mi (5.7 km^{2})

Population (2021)
  - Total: 22
  - Density: 10/sq mi (3.9/km^{2})
- Time zone: UTC+1 (CET)
  - Summer (DST): UTC+2 (CEST)

Brestovačka Brda is a village in Croatia.

== Demographics ==
According to the 2021 census, its population was 22.
