= Donje Polje =

Settlement in Šibenik-Knin County, Croatia

- Settlement
- Interactive map of Donje Polje
- Location of Donje Polje in Croatia
- Coordinates: 43°42′57″N 15°55′12″E
- Country: Croatia
- County: Šibenik-Knin
- City: Šibenik

Area
  - Total: 9.4 km^{2} (3.6 sq mi)

Population (2021)
  - Total: 188
  - Density: 20/km^{2} (52/sq mi)
- Time zone: UTC+1 (CET)
  - Summer (DST): UTC+2 (CEST)
- Postal code: 22000 Šibenik
- Area code: +385 (0)22

Donje Polje is a settlement in the City of Šibenik in Croatia. In 2021, its population was 188.

== Demographics ==
Donje Polje: Population trends 1857–2021
v

population	102	86	127	132	150	148	192	226	164	182	133	173	171	199	233	267	188
	1857	1869	1880	1890	1900	1910	1921	1931	1948	1953	1961	1971	1981	1991	2001	2011	2021

Sources: Croatian Bureau of Statistics publications
