= Susek =

Susek Сусек (Serbian)
- Village (Selo)
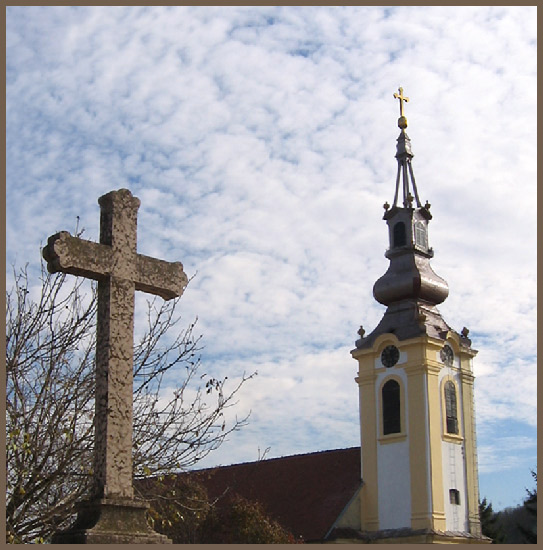
- Church of the Holy Archangel Gabriel
- Interactive map of Susek
- Location within Vojvodina Location within Serbia Location within Europe
- Coordinates: 45°13′30″N 19°32′0″E
- Country: Serbia
- Province: Vojvodina
- Region: Syrmia (Podunavlje)
- District: South Bačka
- Municipality: Beočin

Population (2022)
  - Total: 847
- Time zone: UTC+1 (CET)
  - Summer (DST): UTC+2 (CEST)

Susek (Serbian Cyrillic: Сусек) is a village in Serbia. It is situated in the Beočin municipality, in the Vojvodina province. Although, the village is geographically located in Syrmia, it is part of the South Bačka District. The village has a Serb ethnic majority and its population numbering 847 people (2022 census).

== History ==
Following Ottoman retreat from the region, the Lordship of Ilok and Upper Syrmia was established, and the village became part of its domain.

During the Axis occupation in World War II, 252 civilians were killed in Susek by fascists.

== Historical population ==
- 1931: 3,124
- 1961: 1,502
- 1971: 1,440
- 1981: 1,217
- 1991: 1,137
- 2011: 998
- 2022: 847

== See also ==
- List of places in Serbia
- List of cities, towns and villages in Vojvodina
