= Banovina of Croatia =

Autonomous province (banovina) of the Kingdom of Yugoslavia between 1939 and 1941

Banovina of Croatia Banovina Hrvatska Бановина Хрватска
- Banovina of the Kingdom of Yugoslavia
- 1939–1945
- Flag Coat of arms

- Banovina of Croatia (red) within Kingdom of Yugoslavia (light yellow)
- Capital: Zagreb
- Area
  - Coordinates: 45°49′N 15°59′E
- Government
  - Type: Devolved autonomous banate
- Monarch
  - 1939–1941: Peter II
- Ban
  - 1939–1941: Ivan Šubašić
- Legislature: Parliament
- Historical era: Interwar period World War II
  - Cvetković–Maček Agreement: 24 August 1939
  - Axis invasion of Yugoslavia: 6-18 April 1941
Preceded by
Sava Banovina
Littoral Banovina
Zeta Banovina
Danube Banovina
Drina Banovina
Succeeded by
1941: Independent State of Croatia
Fascist Italy
- Today part of: Croatia; Bosnia and Herzegovina; Serbia; Slovenia

The Banovina of Croatia or Banate of Croatia (Serbo-Croatian: Banovina Hrvatska, Бановина Хрватска) was an administrative subdivision (banovina) of the Kingdom of Yugoslavia between 1939 and 1941 but continued to exist de jure until 1945. It was formed by a merger of Sava and Littoral banovinas into a single autonomous entity, with small parts of the Drina, Zeta, Vrbas and Danube banovinas also included. Its capital was Zagreb and it included most of present-day Croatia along with portions of Bosnia and Herzegovina and Serbia. Its sole Ban during this period was Ivan Šubašić.

== Background ==
In the Vidovdan Constitution of 1921, the Kingdom of Serbs, Croats and Slovenes had established 33 administrative districts, each headed by a government-appointed prefect. Both the Vidovdan Constitution in general and the administrative districts in particular were part of the design of Nikola Pašić and Svetozar Pribićević to maximize the power of the ethnic Serb population within the new state. The new constitution was passed in a political climate favorable to the Serbian centralists, as the Croatian regionalists chose to abstain from parliamentary duty, whereas the deputies of the Communist Party of Yugoslavia were excluded by a parliamentary vote. An amendment to the electoral law in June of 1922 further stacked the deck in favor of the Serbian population, when electoral constituencies were created based on pre-war census figures, allowing Serbia to ignore its massive military casualties sustained in the First World War. This only furthered the resentment felt by the proponents of a federate or confederate state towards the government, particularly the Croatian regionalists of the Croatian Republican Peasant Party (HRSS) around Stjepan Radić. Radić was shot in parliament by a Serbian delegate in 1928 and died two months later. This provoked the withdrawal of the HRSS from the assembly, forged an anti-Belgrade mindset in Croatia and ultimately led to the collapse of the constitutional system of the Kingdom of Serbs, Croats and Slovenes.

After fruitless efforts to fix the Serb-Croat divide and Croat abstention from government, including a cabinet headed by the nominally neutral Slovene Anton Korošec, King Alexander I of Yugoslavia intervened and, on 6 January 1929, established the 6 January Dictatorship. On 3 October 1929, the country was officially renamed Kingdom of Yugoslavia in an effort to unite the various ethnicities into a greater national identity. The new state had a new constitution, and in place of the 33 administrative districts of the Vidovdan Constitution, it instead established the banovinas. The banovinas were drawn in a way to avoid the old historical, regionalist or ethnic affiliations, but because the King still had a vested interest in maintaining the Serb dominance from which he drew most of his legitimacy as King, six of the nine Banovinas ended up with Serb majorities. Instead of uniting Serbs and Croats into a joint Yugoslav identity, there was widespread Croatian resentment against a perceived Serbian hegemony instead.

Over the course of the next ten years, the royal dictatorship grew in strength and ruled with authoritarian decrees, climaxing in the tenure of Milan Stojadinović as Prime Minister between 1936 and 1939. Stojadinović, who had adopted fascist symbolism, gestures and titles from Benito Mussolini in his aspirations to be Yugoslavia's strongman, ultimately fell from grace because he lost the faith of minority representatives in February of 1939. He was replaced by Dragiša Cvetković, who, in an effort to win Croat support for his government, opened talks with Radić's successor as leader of the Croatian regionalists, Vladko Maček. In a compromise named after the two, the Cvetković-Maček Agreement (also known as the Sporazum), the central government made the concession of merging two of the nine banovinas, Sava and Littoral, into one, the Banovina of Croatia.

== History ==
On the basis of the Cvetković–Maček Agreement, and the Decree on the Banate of Croatia (Uredba o Banovini Hrvatskoj) dated 24 August 1939, the Banate of Croatia was created. The entire area of the Sava and Littoral Banovinas was combined and parts of the Vrbas, Zeta, Drina and Danube banovinas (districts Brčko, Derventa, Dubrovnik, Fojnica, Gradačac, Ilok, Šid and Travnik) were added to form the Banate of Croatia. The borders of the Banate of Croatia are partly the historical borders of Croatia, and partly based on the application of the principle of ethnicity according to which Bosnian and Herzegovinian territory with a majority Croat population was annexed to the Banate.

Under the Agreement, central government continued to control defense, internal security, foreign policy, trade, and transport; but an elected Sabor and a crown-appointed ban would decide internal matters in Croatia. Ironically, the Agreement fueled separatism. Maček and other Croats viewed autonomy as a first step toward full Croatian independence, so they began haggling over territory; Serbs attacked Cvetković, charging that the Agreement brought them no return to democracy and no autonomy; Muslims demanded an autonomous Bosnia; and Slovenes and Montenegrins espoused federalism. Prince Regent Paul appointed a new government with Cvetković as prime minister and Maček as vice prime minister, but it gained little support. In May 1940, fairly free local elections were held in rural municipalities, showing some weakening of support for Maček and Croatian Peasant Party due to poor economic showing.

In 1941, the World War II Axis powers occupied Yugoslavia, and establishing a government-in-exile in London. Legally, the Banovina of Croatia remained a part of the occupied Kingdom of Yugoslavia, while the Axis proceeded to dismember Yugoslav territory and the Banovina along with it. Some of the coastal areas from Split to Zadar and near the Gulf of Kotor were annexed by Fascist Italy but the remainder was added to the Independent State of Croatia. As the Kingdom of Yugoslavia became the Democratic Federal Yugoslavia with the success of the Yugoslav Partisans, a new Federal State of Croatia was established within it, succeeding the Banovina.

== Population ==
In 1939, the banovina of Croatia had a population of 4,299,430 of which three quarters was Roman Catholic, one-fifth was Orthodox, and 4 percent was Muslim. The banovina was divided into 116 districts (kotari) of which 95 had an absolute and 5 had a relative Catholic majority. Although religious in nature as per Yugoslav homogeneity policy, the census also provided insight into ethnic make-up of the banovina as ethnic Croats and Slovenes were predominantly Catholic whereas other ethnicities were not.

== Sports ==
The Croatian Football Federation was the governing body of football within the Banovina. It organized a domestic league and a national team. The Jozo Jakopić-led Banovina of Croatia had four international matches: two pairs of home-and-away matches against Switzerland and Hungary. The Croatian Rowing Championships were held on 29 June 1940.

Croatia men's national ice hockey team played its first friendly game against Slovakia on February 9, 1941 in Bratislava and lost 6-1.

The Croatian Boxing Federation was reconstituted on 5 October 1939 as the governing body of boxing within the entire Banovina of Croatia.

== Gallery ==
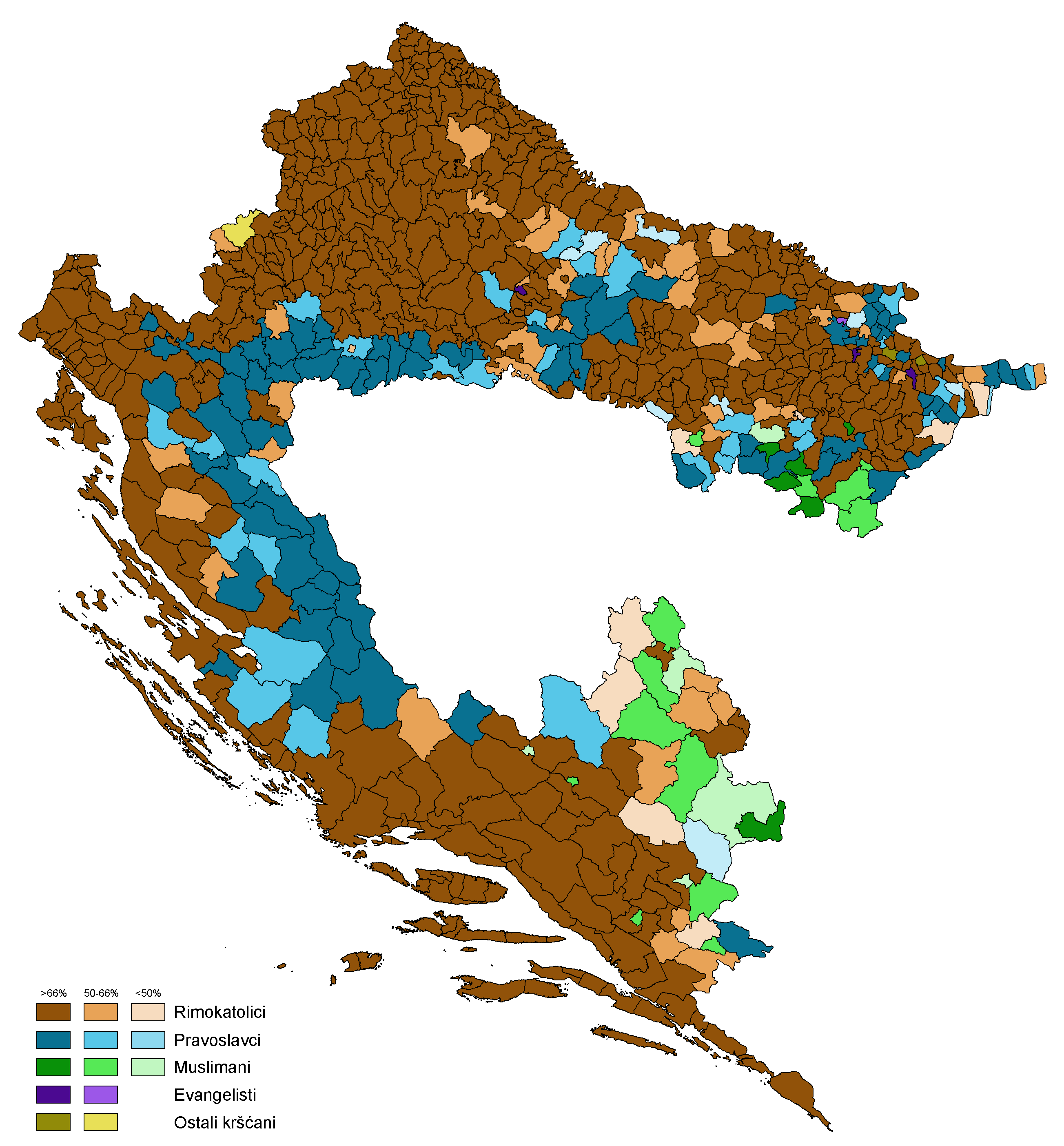
Religious map of the Banovina Croatia by municipality, according to the 1931 census.

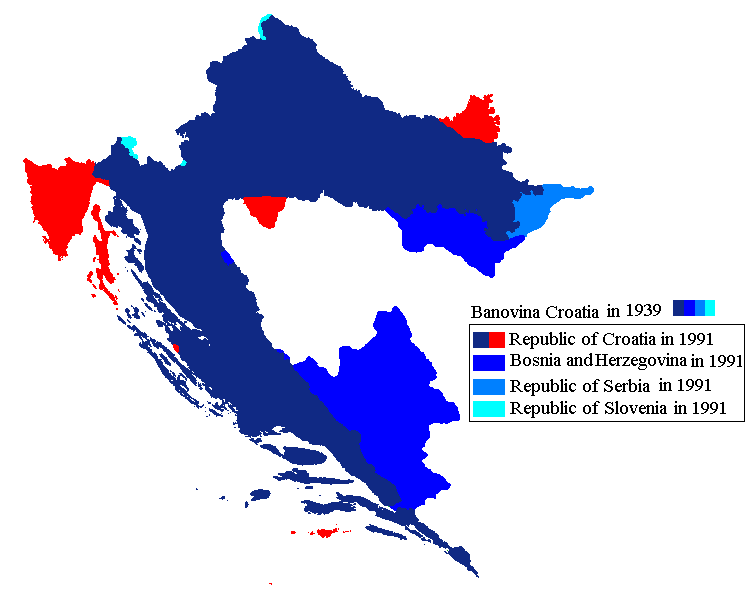
Territory of the Banovina Croatia compared to territory of the present-day countries as well as the prior existing banates.

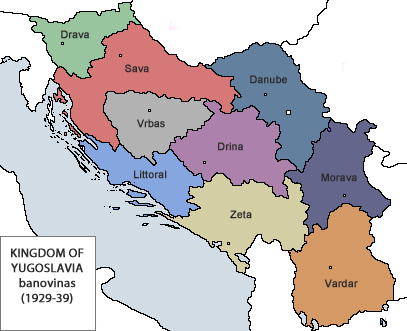
Banates of the Kingdom of Yugoslavia prior to the establishment of the Banovina of Croatia.

Civil flag and ensign

Lesser coat of arms of the Banovina of Croatia

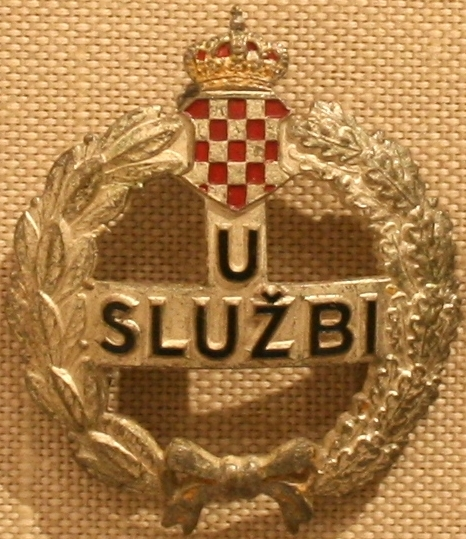
Police ensign with motto "u službi" in Croatian meaning on duty in English.

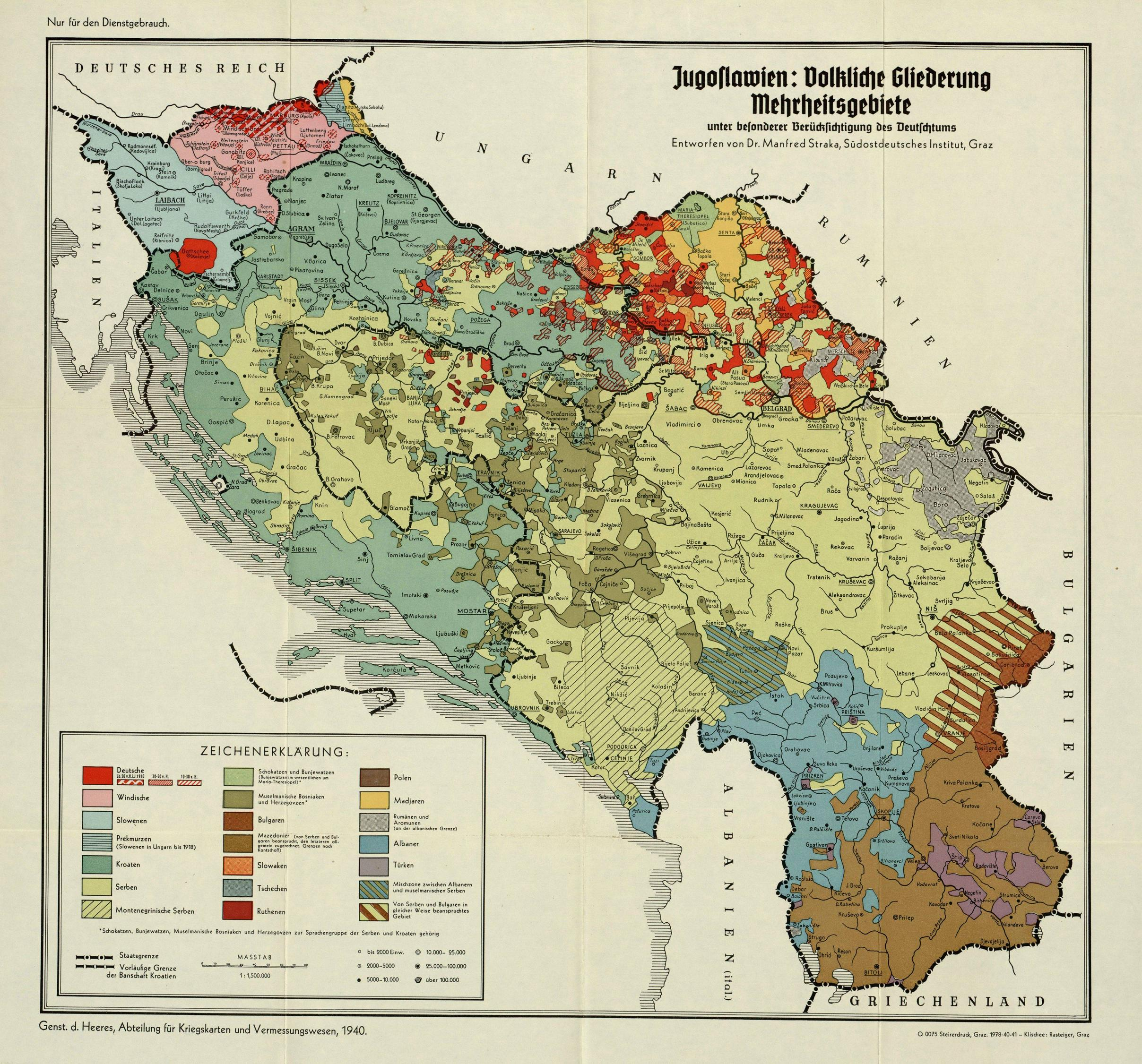
Ethnic map of Yugoslavia, 1940.

== See also ==
- Kingdom of Yugoslavia
- Socialist Republic of Croatia
- Timeline of Croatian history
- Ban of Croatia
- Administrative divisions of the Banovina of Croatia
