= Odra, Zagreb =

Odra
- Village
- Location within Croatia
- Coordinates: 45.73°N 15.992°E
- Country: Croatia
- County: City of Zagreb

Area
  - Total: 5.1 sq mi (13.1 km^{2})

Population (2021)
  - Total: 2,630
  - Density: 520/sq mi (201/km^{2})
- Time zone: UTC+1 (CET)
  - Summer (DST): UTC+2 (CEST)

Odra (Croatian pronunciation: [ôdra]) is a village in Croatia, administratively part of the city of Zagreb.

== Demographics ==
According to the 2021 census, its population was 2,630. According to the 2011 census, it had 1,866 inhabitants.
