= Vojakovac =

Coordinates: 46°05′N 16°36′E

- Village
- Interactive map of Vojakovac
- Country: Croatia
- County: Koprivnica-Križevci County

Area
  - Total: 4.7 km^{2} (1.8 sq mi)

Population (2021)
  - Total: 207
  - Density: 44/km^{2} (110/sq mi)
- Time zone: UTC+1 (CET)
  - Summer (DST): UTC+2 (CEST)

Vojakovac is a village in Croatia.
