= Cvetković =

Cvetković (Serbian Cyrillic: Цветковић) is a Serbian surname, derived from the male given name Cvetko. It may refer to:

- Andrijana Cvetkovik (born 1981), Macedonian film director, writer and diplomat
- Borislav Cvetković (born 1962), Serbian football coach and former Yugoslav footballer
- Branko Cvetković (born 1984), Serbian professional basketball player
- Chris Cvetkovic (born 1977), Canadian football long snapper for the Winnipeg Blue Bombers
- Dragiša Cvetković (1893–1969), Yugoslav politician
- Ivan Cvetković (born 1981), Serbian football player
- Lidija Cvetkovic (born 1967), contemporary Australian poet
- Mirko Cvetković (born 1950), Serbian economist and Prime Minister of Serbia
- Nemanja Cvetković (born 1980), Serbian football Right back
- Vladimir Cvetković (1941–2026), Serbian basketball player and sports administrator
- Zoran Cvetković (born 1976), Serbia footballer
- Zvjezdan Cvetković (born 1960), former Croatian football player

== See also ==
- Cvetković-Maček Agreement, a political agreement on the internal divisions in the Kingdom of Yugoslavia which was settled on August 26, 1939, by Yugoslav prime minister Dragiša Cvetković and Vladko Maček, a Croat politician
