= Plehan =

Coordinates: 44°56′9″N 17°59′27″E

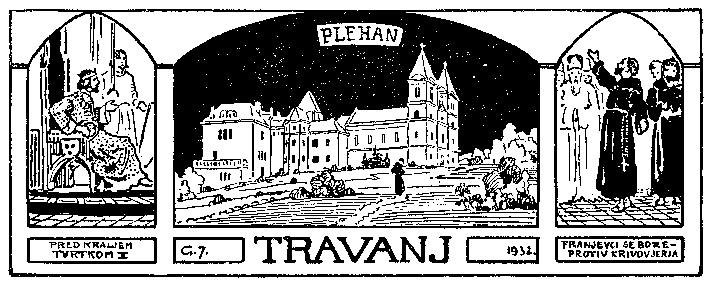

Plehan is the hill about 315 meters high in Bosnia and Herzegovina 9 km southeast of town Derventa. It is site of prominent religious ground — Plehan, Kovačevci, Town of Derventa, Republika Srpska, Bosnia and Herzegovina.

== History ==
It is famous by a catholic parish of the same name, one of the oldest in the area dating from the Middle Ages. In 19th century Franciscans built monastery and later they added new church. It had a rich library and museum and it became site of pilgrimage and public gathering place for many Croats living in Derventa's county. During the war in Bosnia and Herzegovina in 1992 the church and monastery were demolished by Serb military forces, some of the new structures began to be rebuilt in 2001.
