= Končanica =

Končanica Končenice (Czech)
- Municipality
- Municipality of Končanica; Općina Končanica
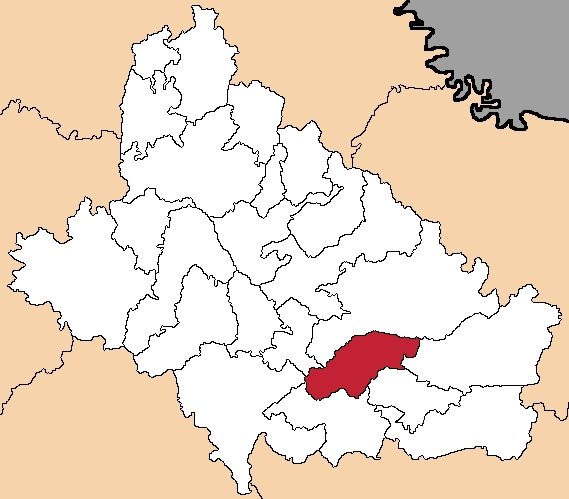
- Interactive map of Končanica
- Location within Croatia
- Coordinates: 45.637877°N 17.164602°E
- Country: Croatia
- County: Bjelovar-Bilogora County

Government
  - Mayor: Zlatko Bakunić (HDZ)

Area
  - Municipality: 32.4 sq mi (84.0 km^{2})
  - Urban: 8.0 sq mi (20.7 km^{2})

Population (2021)
  - Municipality: 1,805
  - Density: 55.7/sq mi (21.5/km^{2})
  - Urban: 692
  - Urban density: 86.6/sq mi (33.4/km^{2})
- Time zone: UTC+1 (CET)
  - Summer (DST): UTC+2 (CEST)
- Website: koncanica.hr

Končanica (Czech: Končenice) is a settlement and a municipality in Slavonia, in the Bjelovar-Bilogora County of Croatia.

== History ==
In the late 19th and early 20th century, Končanica was part of the Požega County of the Kingdom of Croatia-Slavonia.

== Demographics ==
According to the 2021 census, the population of the municipality was 1,805 with 692 living in the town proper. There were 3,516 inhabitants in 2001, of which 95% are Croats. In 2011, the population was 2,360 with 1,110 (47.0%) Czechs, 983 (41.7%) Croats, 180 (7.6%) Serbs and 43 (1.8%) Hungarians (2011 census). As such, it is one of a small number of counties where ethnic Croats do not form a majority or plurality.

The municipality consists of the following settlements:

- Boriš, population 6
- Brestovačka Brda, population 22
- Daruvarski Brestovac, population 546
- Dioš, population 121
- Imsovac, population 135
- Končanica, population 692
- Otkopi, population 57
- Stražanac, population 97
- Šuplja Lipa, population 129
Končanica: Population trends 1857–2021
v

population	1850	2621	3017	3655	4300	4947	5190	5235	5180	5314	5102	4157	3538	3146	2824	2360	1805
	1857	1869	1880	1890	1900	1910	1921	1931	1948	1953	1961	1971	1981	1991	2001	2011	2021

Sources: Croatian Bureau of Statistics publications

== Politics ==
=== Official usage of Czech minority language ===
The Municipality of Končanice has officially introduced Czech language as an equal co-official language alongside Croatian, in accordance with decisions by the Government of the Republic of Croatia. The municipality's statute guarantees the Czech national minority in Končanice the right to representation in the municipality’s legislative, executive, and administrative bodies. In the settlements of Končanica, Daruvarski Brestovac, Otkopi, and Boriš, full equal use of Czech language is prescribed. In these settlements, bilingual signage for places and traffic signs is ensured, and legal and physical persons operating or registered in these settlements and engaged in public activities are ensured to follow bilingualism. As of 2023, most the legal requirements for the fulfillment of bilingual standards have only been partly carried out. Official buildings do have Czech signage, as do street signs, traffic signs and seals. Czech is used on some official documents but not others. There are no public legal and administrative employees proficient in the language. Preserving traditional Czech place names and assigning street names to Czech historical figures is legally mandated and carried out.

=== Minority councils and representatives ===
Directly elected minority councils and representatives are tasked with consulting tasks for the local or regional authorities in which they are advocating for minority rights and interests, integration into public life and participation in the management of local affairs. At the 2023 Croatian national minorities councils and representatives elections Czechs and Serbs of Croatia fulfilled legal requirements to elect their own 10 members minority councils of the Municipality of Končanica.

== See also ==
- List of Croatian municipalities with minority languages in official use
