= Aladinići =

- Village
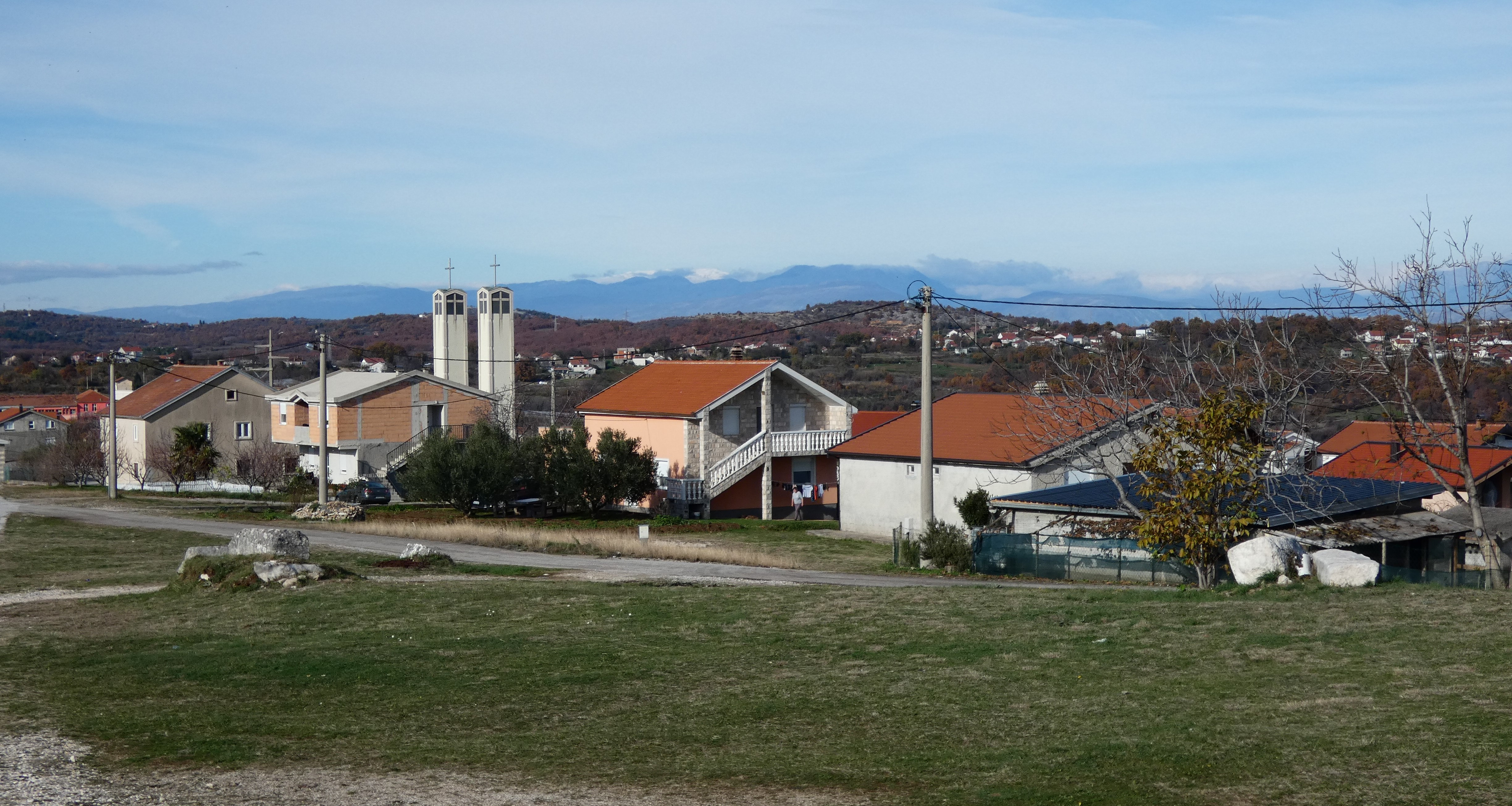

- Location within Bosnia and Herzegovina
- Coordinates: 43.1224°N 17.8560°E
- Country: Bosnia and Herzegovina
- Entity: Federation of Bosnia and Herzegovina
- Canton: Herzegovina-Neretva
- Municipality: Stolac

Area
  - Total: 2.83 sq mi (7.32 km^{2})

Population (2013)
  - Total: 1,234
  - Density: 437/sq mi (169/km^{2})
- Time zone: UTC+1 (CET)
  - Summer (DST): UTC+2 (CEST)

Aladinići is a village in the municipality of Stolac, Bosnia and Herzegovina.

== Demographics ==
According to the 2013 census, its population was 1,234.

Ethnicity in 2013
Ethnicity	Number	Percentage
Croats	968	78.4%
Bosniaks	263	21.3%
Serbs	1	0.1%
other/undeclared	2	0.2%
Total	1,234	100%
