= Sveti Petar Čvrstec =

Coordinates: 46°00′N 16°43′E

- Village
- Interactive map of Sveti Petar Čvrstec
- Country: Croatia
- County: Koprivnica-Križevci County

Area
  - Total: 21.9 km^{2} (8.5 sq mi)

Population (2021)
  - Total: 437
  - Density: 20.0/km^{2} (51.7/sq mi)
- Time zone: UTC+1 (CET)
  - Summer (DST): UTC+2 (CEST)

Sveti Petar Čvrstec is a village in Croatia.
