= Daruvarski Brestovac =

Daruvarski Brestovac Daruvarský Brestov (Czech)
- Village
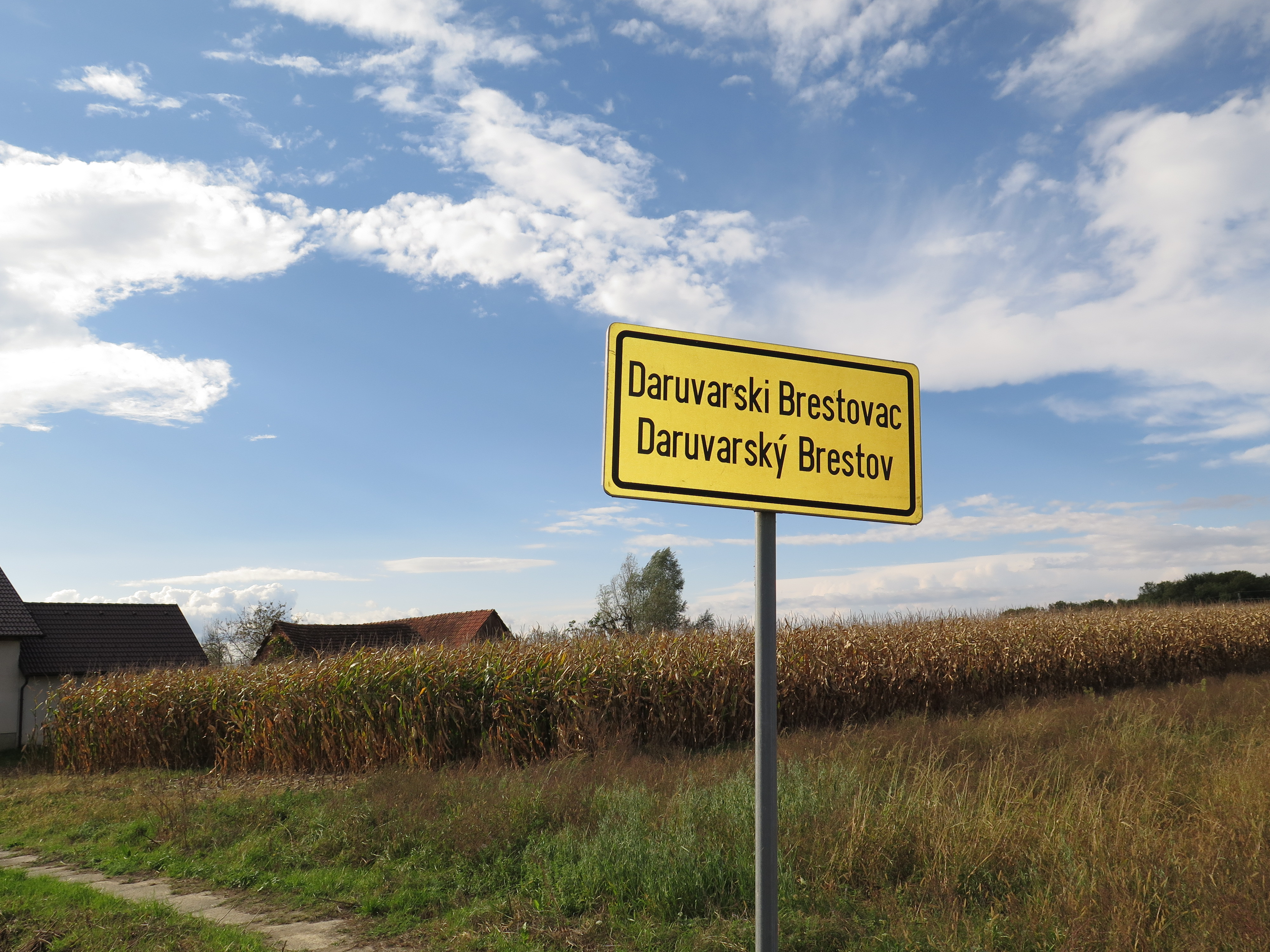

- Location within Croatia
- Coordinates: 45.6304567°N 17.0803237°E
- Country: Croatia
- County: Bjelovar-Bilogora County
- Municipality: Končanica

Area
  - Total: 9.1 sq mi (23.5 km^{2})

Population (2021)
  - Total: 546
  - Density: 60.2/sq mi (23.2/km^{2})
- Time zone: UTC+1 (CET)
  - Summer (DST): UTC+2 (CEST)

Daruvarski Brestovac (Czech: Daruvarský Brestov) is a village in Croatia.

== Demographics ==
According to the 2021 census, its population was 546.

=== Official usage of Czech ===
The Municipality of Končanice uses the Czech language as an equal co-official language, alongside Croatian. Signage is bilingual, and official business can be conducted in either language.
