= Dioš =

- Village
- Location within Croatia
- Coordinates: 45.6420098°N 17.1842526°E
- Country: Croatia
- County: Bjelovar-Bilogora County
- Municipality: Končanica

Area
  - Total: 0.66 sq mi (1.7 km^{2})

Population (2021)
  - Total: 121
  - Density: 180/sq mi (71/km^{2})
- Time zone: UTC+1 (CET)
  - Summer (DST): UTC+2 (CEST)

Dioš is a village in Croatia.

== Demographics ==
According to the 2021 census, its population was 121.

== Literature ==
- Obad Šćitaroci, Mladen; Bojanić Obad Šćitaroci, Bojana; Dundović, Boris (2013). "Manors and Gardens in Northern Croatia in the Age of Historicism" (PDF). Centropa. pp. 175–186. ISSN 1532-5563.
