= Bizovac =

- Municipality
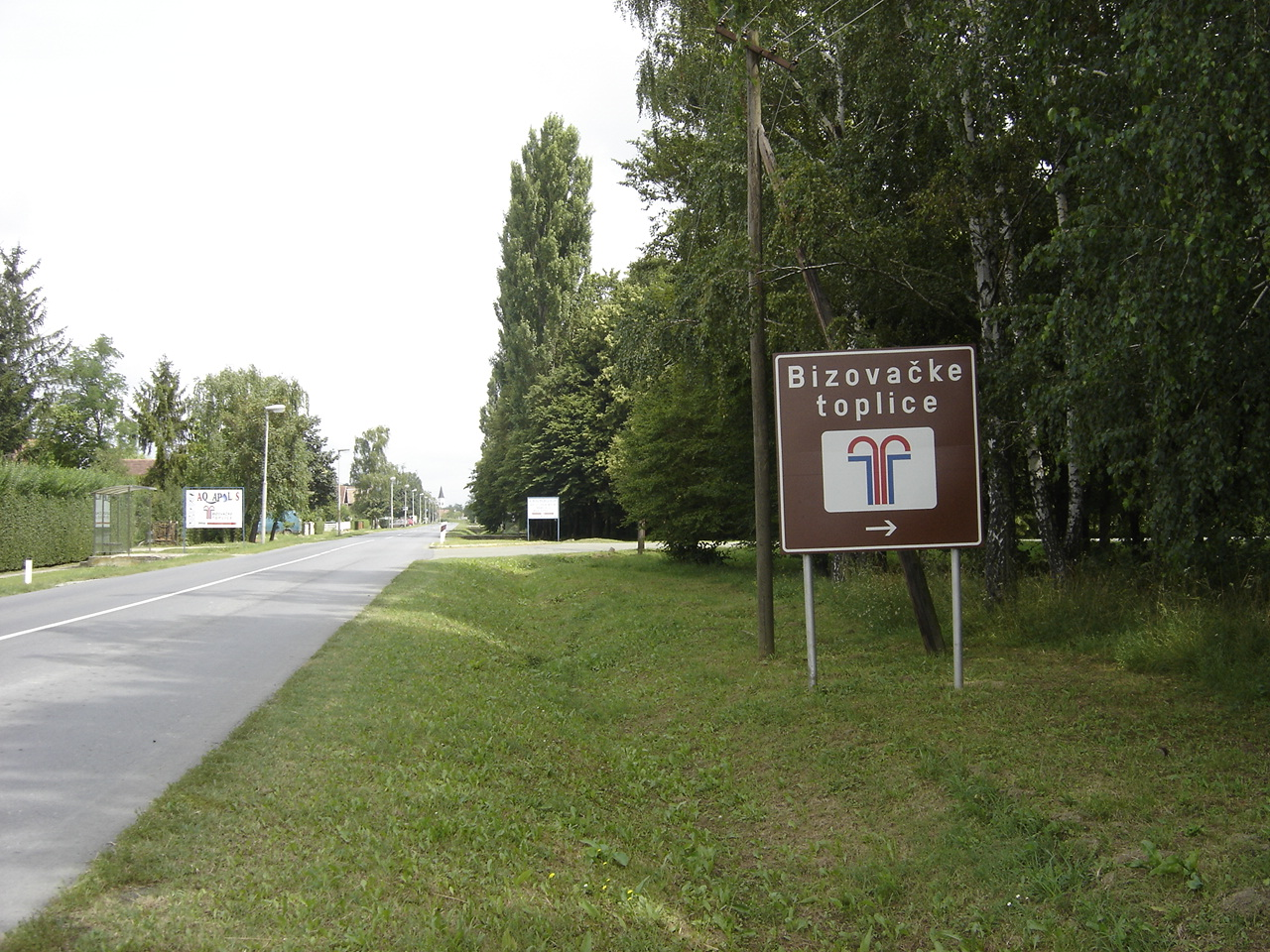

- Flag Coat of arms

- Location of Bizovac in Croatia Bizovac (Croatia) Bizovac (Europe)
- Coordinates: 45.59°N 18.46°E
- Country: Croatia
- Region: Slavonia
- County: Osijek-Baranja County

Government
  - Municipal Mayor: Srećko Vuković

Area
  - Municipality: 98.1 km^{2} (37.9 sq mi)
  - Urban: 21.2 km^{2} (8.2 sq mi)

Population (2021)
  - Municipality: 3,733
  - Density: 38.1/km^{2} (98.6/sq mi)
  - Urban: 1,713
  - Urban density: 80.8/km^{2} (209/sq mi)
- Time zone: UTC+1 (Central European Time)
- Website: opcina-bizovac.hr

Bizovac is a village and a municipality in Osijek-Baranja County, Croatia.

== Population ==
At the 2011 census, there were a total of 4,507 inhabitants in the municipality, in the following settlements:

- Bizovac, population 2,043
- Brođanci, population 547
- Cerovac, population 24
- Cret Bizovački, population 604
- Habjanovci, population 460
- Novaki Bizovački, population 203
- Samatovci, population 613
- Selci, population 13

97.76% of the population was Croat, as per the 2011 census.

Colonist settlements of Grabik and Novaki Bizovački were established on the territory of the municipality of the village during the land reform in interwar Yugoslavia.

== Attractions ==
Bizovac has a hotel and spa complex, with underground heated water originating from the remains of Pannonian Sea that covered the region. Bizovac also has one of the rarest Croatian folkloric costumes, and distinct cakes and cuisine.

== Literature ==
- Obad Šćitaroci, Mladen; Bojanić Obad Šćitaroci, Bojana; Dundović, Boris (2013). "Manors and Gardens in Northern Croatia in the Age of Historicism" (PDF). Centropa. pp. 175–186. ISSN 1532-5563. Archived from the original (PDF) on 2025-05-05.
