= 1935 Yugoslavian parliamentary election =

- 5 May 1935

All 370 seats in the National Assembly 161 seats needed for a majority
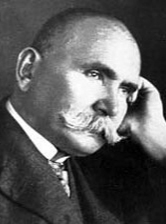

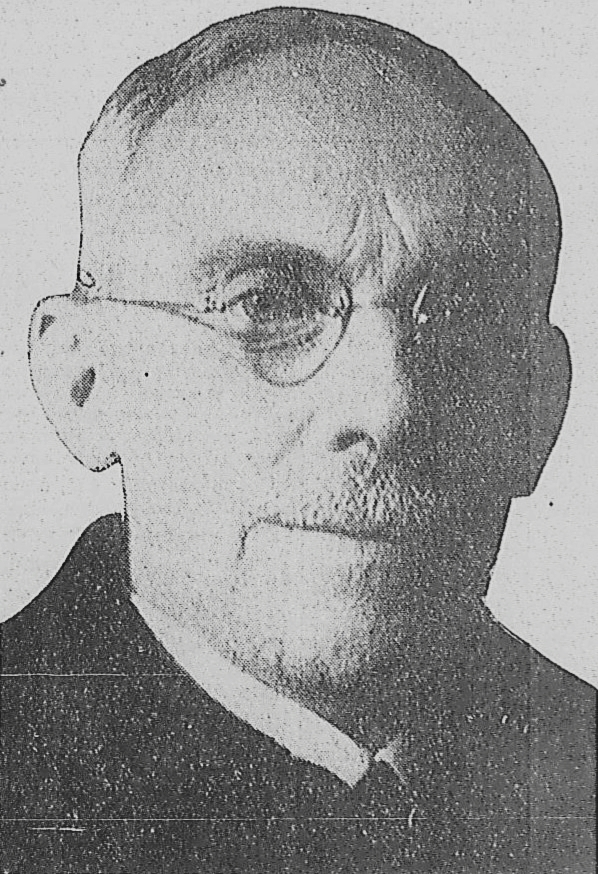
| | First party | Second party |
|---|---|---|
| Leader | Nikola Uzunović | Vlatko Maček |
| Party | JNS | HSS |
| Alliance | — | United Opposition |
| Seats won | 303 | 67 |
| Seat change | ▼2 | New |
| Popular vote | 1,746,982 | 1,076,345 |
| Percentage | 60.64% | 37.36% |
- Most voted-for list by banovina
Prime Minister before election
Bogoljub Jevtić
JNS
Prime Minister after election
Milan Stojadinović
JNS

Parliamentary elections were held in Yugoslavia on 5 May 1935. The result was a victory for the governing Yugoslav National Party (JNS), which won 303 of the 370 seats in Parliament.

Rioting among Croats and Slovenes prior to the election resulted in the death of 16 people during 19 and 20 February. Prior to the elections the government obstructed the Socialist Party of Yugoslavia from fielding candidates. On 1 May Yugoslav gendarmery killed one and injured 50 after rioting broke out in Sarajevo subsequent to authorities banning a speech by Mehmed Spaho.

On election day 2,000 anti-government protesters in Belgrade were dispersed by police. Hundreds of youth were arrested on election day and foreign journalists were expelled from the country.

== Results ==
| Party | Votes | % | Seats | +/– |
|---|---|---|---|---|
| Yugoslav National Party | 1,746,982 | 60.64 | 303 | –2 |
| United Opposition | 1,076,345 | 37.36 | 67 | New |
| Yugoslav National Movement | 33,549 | 1.16 | 0 | New |
| Bož Maksimović List | 24,088 | 0.84 | 0 | New |
| Total | 2,880,964 | 100.00 | 370 | +65 |
| Registered voters/turnout | 3,908,313 | – | | |
Source: Nohlen et al.

=== Elected members ===
- Luka Abramović (United Opposition, Glamoč, Vrbas Banovina)
- Jordan Aćimović (JNS, Strumica, Vardar Banovina)
- Velimir Aćimović (Grocka, Danube Banovina)
- Kosta Aleksić (Valjevo, Drina Banovina)
- Borivoje Antić (JNS, Salaš, Morava Banovina)
- Dušan Antonijević (JNS, Kruševo, Vardar Banovina)
- Živojin Aranđelović (Veliko Orašje, Danube Banovina)
- Jovan Aranđelović (JNS, Bela Palanka, Morava Banovina)
- Miljkan Arežina (JNS, Bosansko Grahovo, Vrbas Banovina)
- Damjan Arnautović (JNS, Berovo, Vardar Banovina)
- Ljudevit Auer (JNS, Sisak, Sava Banovina)
- Antun Babić (United Opposition, Županja, Sava Banovina)
- Milan Badžak (Mladenovac, Danube Banovina)
- Milan Banić (JNS, Sušak, Sava Banovina)
- Ivan Banković (United Opposition, Karlovac, Sava Banovina)
- Janko Baričević (JNS, Prelog, Sava Banovina)
- Vinko Belinić (JNS, Donja Stubica, Sava Banovina)
- Josip Benko (JNS, Murska Sobota, Drava Banovina)
- Josip Berković (Metković and Hvar, Littoral Banovina)
- Šerif Bećirović (JNS, Vučitrn, Morava Banovina)
- Dimitrije Beširović (JNS, Đevđelija, Vardar Banovina)
- Mijo Birtić (United Opposition, Đakovo, Sava Banovina)
- Milan Blažić (JNS, Ohrid, Vardar Banovina)
- Petar Bogavac (JNS, Kraljevo, Morava Banovina)
- Strahinja Borisavljević (JNS, Sjenica, Zeta Banovina)
- Franjo Borić (United Opposition, Crikvenica, Sava Banovina)
- Dušan Bošković (Kovačica and Pančevo, Danube Banovina)
- Mihajlo Bošković (JNS, Danilovgrad, Zeta Banovina)
- Jakša Božić (Rača, Danube Banovina)
- Milan Božić (Višegrad, Drina Banovina)
- Ljubomir Božinović (JNS, Knjaževac, Morava Banovina)
- Đorđe Branković (JNS, Otočac, Sava Banovina)
- Mihael Brenčič (JNS, Ptuj, Drava Banovina)
- Jovan Brujić (JNS, Doboj, Vrbas Banovina)
- Stevan Bubić (JNS, Bjelovar, Sava Banovina)
- Šimun Bugarin (United Opposition, Dugo Selo, Sava Banovina)
- Simo Budimir (JNS, Mrkonjić Grad, Vrbas Banovina)
- Aleksandar Butorka (Alibunar, Danube Banovina)
- Ante Cividini (United Opposition, Čabar, Sava Banovina)
- Lazar Crljić (JNS, Derventa, Vrbas Banovina)
- Josip Cvetić (JNS, Gospić, Sava Banovina)
- Dragiša Cvetković (JNS, Niš, Morava Banovina)
- Nikola Cvetojević (United Opposition, Bosanski Novi, Vrbas Banovina)
- Sigismund Čajkovac (United Opposition, Vinkovci, Sava Banovina)
- Ragib Čapljić (Rogatica, Drina Banovina)
- Đuro Čejović (JNS, Bar, Zeta Banovina)
- Krsto Čolaković (JNS, Srbica, Zeta Banovina)
- Branko Čubrilović (United Opposition, Bosanska Dubica, Vrbas Banovina)
- Vojko Čvrkić
- Stevan Ćirić
- Husein Ćumavić (Zvornik, Drina Banovina)
- Aleksandar Dačić
- Dragan Damić (JNS, Slavonski Brod, Sava Banovina)
- Živko Danilović (JNS, Prijedor, Vrbas Banovina)
- Brana Davinić
- Radoslav Dimić (JNS, Debar, Vardar Banovina)
- Kosta Dimitrijević (JNS, Varvarin, Morava Banovina)
- Ljutica Dimitrijević (JNS, Kladovo, Morava Banovina)
- Mita Dimitrijević (JNS, Kočani, Vardar Banovina)
- Stojadin Dimitrijević (JNS, Tetovo, Vardar Banovina)
- Živojin Dimitrijević
- Tanasije Dinić (JNS, Sveti Nikola, Vardar Banovina)
- Karel Doberšek (JNS, Prevalje, Drava Banovina)
- Rudolf Dobovišek (United Opposition, Šmarje pri Jelšah, Drava Banovina)
- Branko Dobrosavljević (JNS, Slunj, Sava Banovina)
- Milan Dobrović (JNS, Daruvar, Sava Banovina)
- Mato Domović (United Opposition, Pregrada, Sava Banovina)
- Mirko Došen (JNS, Korenica, Sava Banovina)
- Vojislav Došen
- Mustafa Durgutović (JNS, Orahovac, Zeta Banovina)
- Vojislav Đorđević
- Borivoje Đurić
- Simo Ðurić (JNS, Nova Gradiška, Sava Banovina)
- Danilo Đurović (JNS, Južni Brod, Vardar Banovina)
- Milailo Đurović (JNS, Surdulica, Vardar Banovina)
- Bogdan Ercegovac (JNS, Glina, Sava Banovina)
- Viktor Fizir (JNS, Ludbreg, Sava Banovina)
- Riko Fuks (JNS, Ljubljana, Drava Banovina)
- Vojislav Gaćinović (JNS, Bileća, Zeta Banovina)
- Pavle Gajić
- Radomir Gajić (JNS, Donji Milanovac, Morava Banovina)
- Karl Gajšek (JNS, Slovenske Konjice, Drava Banovina)
- Petar Galogaža (JNS, Vrginmost, Sava Banovina)
- Nikola Gavrilović (JNS, Osijek, Sava Banovina)
- Oto Gavrilović
- Joca Georgijević
- Andrija Gibanjek (United Opposition, Čazma, Sava Banovina)
- Milan Glavinić (JNS, Priština, Vardar Banovina)
- Milenko Glišić
- Milan Golubović (JNS, Svrljig, Morava Banovina)
- Vinko Gornjak (JNS, Maribor, Drava Banovina)
- Milovan Grba (JNS, Vojnić, Sava Banovina)
- Risto Grćić (JNS, Gacko, Zeta Banovina)
- Jakob Grgurić
- Spira Hadži-Ristić
- Sulejman Hafizadić (Travnik, Drina Banovina)
- Franjo Harapin (United Opposition, Klanjec, Sava Banovina)
- Avdo Hasanbegović (Tuzla, Drina Banovina)
- Grga Hećimović (United Opposition, Novi Vinodolski, Sava Banovina)
- Stjepan Hefer (HSS/United Opposition, Valpovo, Sava Banovina)
- Stanko Hočevar (JNS, Ljubljana, Drava Banovina)
- Franjo Horvat (JNS, Zagreb, Sava Banovina)
- Nikola Hundrić (United Opposition, Sveti Ivan Zelina, Sava Banovina)
- Abdulah Ibrahimpašić (United Opposition, Bihać, Vrbas Banovina)
- Veljko Ilić (JNS, Koprivnica, Sava Banovina)
- Milivoje Isaković
- Dušan Ivančević (JNS, Gračac, Sava Banovina)
- Petar Ivanišević (JNS, Trebinje, Zeta Banovina)
- Dragoljub Ivanović
- Bogdan Iveković (JNS, Novi Marof, Sava Banovina)
- Ivan Jančič (JNS, Maribor, Drava Banovina)
- Vojislav Janjić
- Desimir Janković (JNS, Kučevo, Morava Banovina)
- Dragutin Janković (JNS, Skoplje, Vardar Banovina)
- Stevan Janković
- Ivan Janžekovič (JNS, Maribor, Drava Banovina)
- Cvetko Jeličić (JNS, Brus, Morava Banovina)
- Dragoljub Jevremović (JNS, Petrovac na Mlavi, Morava Banovina)
- Bogoljub Jevtić
- Đorđe Jevtić
- Životije Jevtić (JNS, Jagodina, Morava Banovina)
- Velimir Jojić (JNS, Peć, Zeta Banovina)
- Ugrin Joksimović (JNS, Gostivar, Vardar Banovina)
- Zarija Joksimović (JNS, Berane, Zeta Banovina)
- Dragoljub Jovanović (United Opposition, Pirot, Morava Banovina)
- Đorđe Jovanović
- Jovan Jovanović (JNS, Prnjavor, Vrbas Banovina)
- Ljubomir Jovanović (JNS, Aleksinac, Morava Banovina)
- Nikola Jovanović (JNS, Kolašin, Zeta Banovina)
- Vasilije Jovanović (JNS, Bosanski Petrovac, Vrbas Banovina)
- Radoje Jovičić
- Ivan Juriša (JNS, Zagreb, Sava Banovina)
- Nikola Kabalin (JNS, Zagreb, Sava Banovina)
- Stevan Kaćanski
- Alija Kadić
- Mijo Kajić
- Mihailo Kalamatijević (JNS, Štip, Vardar Banovina)
- Branko Kalember (JNS, Udbina, Sava Banovina)
- Branko Kalućerčić
- Ismet-beg Gavran Kapetanović (Čajniče, Drina Banovina)
- Joco Kašanin
- Mihael Kašper
- Vladimir Kazimirović (JNS, Jabukovac, Morava Banovina)
- Anton Kersnik (JNS, Kamnik, Drava Banovina)
- Franc Klar (JNS, Donja Lendava, Drava Banovina)
- Bogoljub Knežević (JNS, Kruševac, Morava Banovina)
- Jure Koce (JNS, Črnomelj, Drava Banovina)
- Dragutin Kojić (JNS, Skoplje, Vardar Banovina)
- Albin Koman (JNS, Ljubljana, Drava Banovina)
- Mirko Komnenović (JNS, Kotor, Zeta Banovina)
- Mirko Kosić
- Petar Kosović (JNS, Bitolj, Vardar Banovina)
- Luka Kostrenčić (JNS, Krk, Sava Banovina)
- Ante Kovač (JNS, Jastrebarsko, Sava Banovina)
- Milan Kovačević
- Marko Kožul
- Stevan Kraft
- Dragan Kraljević (JNS, Slavonska Požega, Sava Banovina)
- Mihailo Krstić (JNS, Ražanj, Morava Banovina)
- Simo Krstić (JNS, Teslić, Vrbas Banovina)
- Stojan Krstić (JNS, Struga, Vardar Banovina)
- Džafer Kulenović (Žepče, Drina Banovina)
- Šime Kulišić (JNS, Vrbovsko, Sava Banovina)
- Kosta Kumanudi
- Joakim Kunjašić
- Milan Kurilić
- Velimir Kursulić (JNS, Raška, Zeta Banovina)
- Šukrija Kurtović (JNS, Foča, Zeta Banovina)
- Vojko Kurtović (JNS, Prijepolje, Zeta Banovina)
- Živan Kuveždić
- Sreten Kuzeljević (JNS, Nova Varoš, Zeta Banovina)
- Aleksandar Lazarević
- Milan Lazarević (JNS, Kraljevo Selo, Morava Banovina)
- Milovan Lazarević
- Nikon Lazarević (JNS, Rekovac, Morava Banovina)
- Todor Lazarević (JNS, Banja Luka, Vrbas Banovina)
- Vojislav Lazić
- Stanko Lenarčič (JNS, Logatec, Drava Banovina)
- Mihailo Lješević (JNS, Prokuplje, Morava Banovina)
- Niko Ljubičić
- Ivan Lovrenčič (JNS, Kočevje, Drava Banovina)
- Avguštin Lukačič (JNS, Ljutomer, Drava Banovina)
- Mihailo Lukarević (JNS, Vranje, Vardar Banovina)
- Vladko Maček
- Artur Mahnik (JNS, Zagreb, Sava Banovina)
- Ivan Majcan (United Opposition, Donji Miholjac, Sava Banovina)
- Dako Makar (JNS, Metlika, Drava Banovina)
- Franjo Malčić (United Opposition, Zagreb, Sava Banovina)
- Dane Malić (United Opposition, Krapina, Sava Banovina)
- Miloje Marcikić
- Simo Marjanac (JNS, Jajce, Vrbas Banovina)
- Franjo Markić
- Đorđe Marković (JNS, Hrvatska Kostajnica, Sava Banovina)
- Milenko Marković (JNS, Pakrac, Sava Banovina)
- Ante Mastrović
- Pavao Matica (JNS, Ivanec, Sava Banovina)
- Stipe Matijević
- Martin Mesarov (United Opposition, Virovitica, Sava Banovina)
- Ilija Mihailović
- Todor Mihailović (JNS, Kosovska Mitrovica, Zeta Banovina)
- Milan Mijić (JNS, Ključ, Vrbas Banovina)
- Aleksandar Mijović (JNS, Boljevac, Morava Banovina)
- Luka Mijušković (JNS, Istok, Zeta Banovina)
- Đuro Mikašinović (JNS, Ogulin, Sava Banovina)
- Mato Mikić (United Opposition, Gradačac, Vrbas Banovina)
- Sava Mikić (JNS, Bijelo Polje, Zeta Banovina)
- Života Milanović (JNS, Slatina, Sava Banovina)
- Vjekoslav Miletić (JNS, Rab, Sava Banovina)
- Velimir Milijanović
- Branko Miljuš (JNS, Sanski Most, Vrbas Banovina)
- Dušan R. Milošević (JNS, Banja Luka, Vrbas Banovina)
- Dušan S. Milošević (JNS, Vlasotince, Vardar Banovina)
- Radivoje Milošević (JNS, Podujevo, Morava Banovina)
- Dragomir Milovanović (JNS, Sokobanja, Morava Banovina)
- Milinko Milutinović
- Dimitrije Mirković (JNS, Golubac, Morava Banovina)
- Roko Mišetić (United Opposition, Dubrovnik, Zeta Banovina)
- Mile Miškulin (JNS, Perušić, Sava Banovina)
- Petar Mladineo
- Ivan Mohorič (JNS, Radovljica, Drava Banovina)
- Karlo Mrak (United Opposition, Pisarovina, Sava Banovina)
- Milan Mravlje (JNS, Litija, Drava Banovina)
- Mustafa Mulalić (JNS, Gračanica, Vrbas Banovina)
- Osman Muradbašić (United Opposition, Maglaj, Vrbas Banovina)
- Radivoje Nanović (JNS, Valandovo, Vardar Banovina)
- Vojislav Nenadić (JNS, Pljevlja, Zeta Banovina)
- Jovan Nenadović (JNS, Carevo Selo, Vardar Banovina)
- Uroš Nedeljković
- Spaso Nićiforović (JNS, Tutin, Zeta Banovina)
- Časlav Nikitović (JNS, Radovište, Vardar Banovina)
- Branko Nikolić
- Milovan Nikolić
- Radivoje Nikolić
- Slavko Nikolić
- Živko Nikolić
- Anton Novačan (JNS, Slovenj Gradec, Drava Banovina)
- Franjo Novaković (United Opposition, Đurđevac, Sava Banovina)
- Niko Novaković
- Stjepan Novaković (JNS, Varaždin, Sava Banovina)
- Josip Palajić (United Opposition, Novska, Sava Banovina)
- Ljubomir Pantić
- Andrija Papa (United Opposition, Križevci, Sava Banovina)
- Hadži-Ljuba Partnogić (JNS, Prizren, Vardar Banovina)
- Manfred Paštrović
- Branko Paunović
- Ante Pavlović (United Opposition, Brinje, Sava Banovina)
- Gojko Pejin
- Čedomir Pejkić (JNS, Despotovac, Morava Banovina)
- Malić Pelivanović (JNS, Dragaš, Vardar Banovina)
- Milivoje Perić
- Dušan Perović (JNS, Negotin na Vardaru, Vardar Banovina)
- Miljan Perović (JNS, Lebane, Vardar Banovina)
- Đorđe Petković (United Opposition, Svilajnac, Morava Banovina)
- Milan Petković
- Rastko Petković
- Bogdan Petrović (JNS, Kuršumlija, Morava Banovina)
- Rudolf Pevec (United Opposition, Gornji Grad, Drava Banovina)
- Milovan Pinterović (JNS, Osijek, Sava Banovina)
- Rudolf Pleskovič (JNS, Laško, Drava Banovina)
- Aćim Popović (JNS, Preševo, Vardar Banovina)
- Dobrivoje Popović (JNS, Aleksandrovac, Morava Banovina)
- Dušan Popović
- Kosta Popović
- Mihailo Popović (JNS, Resan, Vardar Banovina)
- Novica Popović (JNS, Andrijevica, Zeta Banovina)
- Svetislav Popović
- Velimir Popović (JNS, Paraćin, Morava Banovina)
- Živko Popović (JNS, Gnjilane, Vardar Banovina)
- Živojin Popović (JNS, Ćuprija, Morava Banovina)
- Matija Povrenović
- Nurija Pozderac (United Opposition, Cazin, Vrbas Banovina)
- Krsto Predovan
- Nikola Preka
- Ivan Prekoršek (JNS, Celje, Drava Banovina)
- Muhamed Preljubović (Kladanj, Drina Banovina)
- Milan Pribićević (United Opposition, Dvor, Vrbas Banovina)
- Jeremija Protić
- Miloje Radaković
- Danilo Radoičić (JNS, Šavnik, Zeta Banovina)
- Milivoje Rafailović
- Živojin Rafailović (JNS, Bosiljgrad, Vardar Banovina)
- Ramadan Ramadanović (JNS, Suva Reka, Vardar Banovina)
- Miloš Rašković (JNS, Trstenik, Morava Banovina)
- Miloš Rašović (United Opposition, Podgorica, Zeta Banovina)
- Branko Ratković (JNS, Ljubinje, Zeta Banovina)
- Josip Režek (JNS, Novo Mesto, Drava Banovina)
- Muhamed Rićanović
- Ivan Robić (United Opposition, Velika Gorica, Sava Banovina)
- Josip Rogić (JNS, Senj, Sava Banovina)
- Marko Ružičić
- Gavro Santo
- Ibrahim Sarić (Sarajevo, Drina Banovina)
- Obren Savić (JNS, Uroševac, Vardar Banovina)
- Milan Sekulić
- Stevan Simić (JNS, Kratovo, Vardar Banovina)
- Čedomir Sladojević (JNS, Nikšić, Zeta Banovina)
- Bariša Smoljan
- Miloje Sokić (JNS, Đakovica, Zeta Banovina)
- Momčilo Sokić
- Nikola Sokolović (JNS, Grubišno Polje, Sava Banovina)
- Vukašin Spasović
- Uroš Stajić (JNS, Caribrod, Morava Banovina)
- Aleksandar Stanković (JNS, Babušnica, Morava Banovina)
- Svetolik Stanković
- Svetozar Stanković
- Ignjat Stefanović (JNS, Kavadarci, Vardar Banovina)
- Milivoj Stepanov (JNS, Garešnica, Sava Banovina)
- Risto Stevović (United Opposition, Priboj, Zeta Banovina)
- Milan Stijić (JNS, Našice, Sava Banovina)
- Radmilo Stoiljković (United Opposition, Kumanovo, Vardar Banovina)
- Dragiša Stojadinović (JNS, Negotin, Morava Banovina)
- Dragomir Stojadinović
- Mihailo Stojadinović
- Petar Stojisavljević
- Stamenko Stošić (JNS, Kriva Palanka, Vardar Banovina)
- Dobrivoje Stošović (JNS, Prokuplje, Morava Banovina)
- Zajnel-beg Ibraim Stracimir (JNS, Kačanik, Vardar Banovina)
- Mijo Stuparić (United Opposition, Kutina, Sava Banovina)
- Dušan Subotić (JNS, Bosanska Gradiška, Vrbas Banovina)
- Ivan Šakić
- Fran Šemrov (JNS, Kranj, Drava Banovina)
- Nikola Šijak
- Anton Širola-Brnas (JNS, Kastav, Sava Banovina)
- Luka Šoški (JNS, Bjelovar, Sava Banovina)
- Stojan Špadijer (United Opposition, Cetinje, Zeta Banovina)
- Ivan Šubašić (United Opposition, Delnice, Sava Banovina)
- Živko Šušić (JNS, Novi Pazar, Zeta Banovina)
- Jure Šutej
- Svetozar Tasić (JNS, Bitolj, Vardar Banovina)
- Maksim Tešić (JNS, Kotor Varoš, Vrbas Banovina)
- Vladimir Tišma (JNS, Donji Lapac, Sava Banovina)
- Branislav Todorović (JNS, Rostuša, Vardar Banovina)
- Todor Todorović (JNS, Zaječar, Morava Banovina)
- Žarko Tomašević (JNS, Vukovar, Sava Banovina)
- Ljudevit Tomašić (United Opposition, Samobor, Sava Banovina)
- Branko Tomić
- Jevrem Tomić
- Todor Tonić (JNS, Leskovac, Vardar Banovina)
- Josip Torbar (United Opposition, Zlatar, Sava Banovina)
- Vasilije Trbić (JNS, Prilep, Vardar Banovina)
- Stavra Trpković (JNS, Kičevo, Vardar Banovina)
- Ante Trumbić
- Rajko Turk (JNS, Ljubljana, Drava Banovina)
- Mirko Urošević (JNS, Žagubica, Morava Banovina)
- Tihomir Vasić (Ljubovija, Drina Banovina)
- Andrej Veble (JNS, Brežice, Drava Banovina)
- Miladin Veličković (JNS, Vladičin Han, Vardar Banovina)
- Milorad Veselinović (Batina, Danube Banovina)
- Anton Videc (JNS, Čakovec, Sava Banovina)
- Petar Vlatković (JNS, Petrinja, Sava Banovina)
- Velimir Vrbić (Užice, Drina Banovina)
- Radisav Vučetić (Ub, Drina Banovina)
- Vuk Vujasinović (Benkovac, Littoral Banovina)
- Dimitrije Vujić (Petrovgrad, Danube Banovina)
- Srpko Vukanović (Senta, Danube Banovina)
- Milan Vukićević (Vračar, Danube Banovina)
- Josip-Đido Vuković (Subotica, Danube Banovina)
- Jovo Zagorac
- Čedomir Zaharić
- Jovan Zdravković
- Sekula Zečević (JNS, Nevesinje, Zeta Banovina)
- Boško Zeljković (JNS, Bosanska Krupa, Vrbas Banovina)
- Nikola Zuber (JNS, Cetinje, Zeta Banovina)
- Fran Zupančič (JNS, Krško, Drava Banovina)
- Borisav Živadinović (JNS, Žitkovac, Morava Banovina)
- Radosav Živković
- Todor Živković (JNS, Veles, Vardar Banovina)
- Karlo Žunjević (United Opposition, Preko, Littoral Banovina)
