= 1935 Yugoslavian Senate election =

Partial Senate elections were held in Yugoslavia on 3 February 1935. Half of the 46 elected seats were up for election.

== Background ==
The Senate was created by the 1931 constitution and had 92 members, 46 elected and 46 appointed by the king. The 46 elected members were to serve six-year terms, with 23 elected every six years. Following its creation, all 46 elected members were elected in the January 1932 elections. In October 1934 Senators drew lots to decide the 23 who would serve a three-year term, with their seats coming up for election in 1935.

== Electoral system ==
Of the 23 elected senators, four were elected in Morava Banovina, three in Danube Banovina, Drava Banovina, Drina Banovina and Zeta Banovina, two in Sava Banovina, Vardar Banovina and Vrbas Banovina and one in Littoral Banovina.

== Elected members ==
Constituency	Elected members	Notes
Danube Banovina	Bogoljub Jevtić	
Danube Banovina	Milan Marjanović	Re-elected
Danube Banovina	Antun Vidaković	Re-elected
Drava banovina	Drago Marušič	
Drava banovina	Albert Kramer	
Drava banovina	Ivan Pucelj	
Drina Banovina	Atanasije Šola	Re-elected
Drina Banovina	Pavle Vujić	Re-elected
Drina Banovina	Ivo Vrapić	
Littoral Banovina	Budislav Grga Angjelinović	
Morava Banovina	Velja Popović	
Morava Banovina	Milan Simonović	Re-elected
Morava Banovina	Krsta Radovanović	Re-elected
Morava Banovina	Dusan Stevcić	
Sava Banovina	Petar Teslić	Re-elected
Sava Banovina	Josip Nemec	
Vardar Banovina	Jovan Aleksić	
Vardar Banovina	Serafim Krstić	
Vrbas Banovina	Vaso Glušac	Re-elected
Vrbas Banovina	Asim Alibegović	Re-elected
Zeta Banovina	Marko Radulović	Re-elected
Zeta Banovina	Andra Kujundzić	
Zeta Banovina	Đuro Vukotić	
Source: Politika
