= 1912 in the United Kingdom =

Events from the year 1912 in the United Kingdom.

== Incumbents ==
- Monarch – George V
- Prime Minister – H. H. Asquith (Liberal)

== Events ==
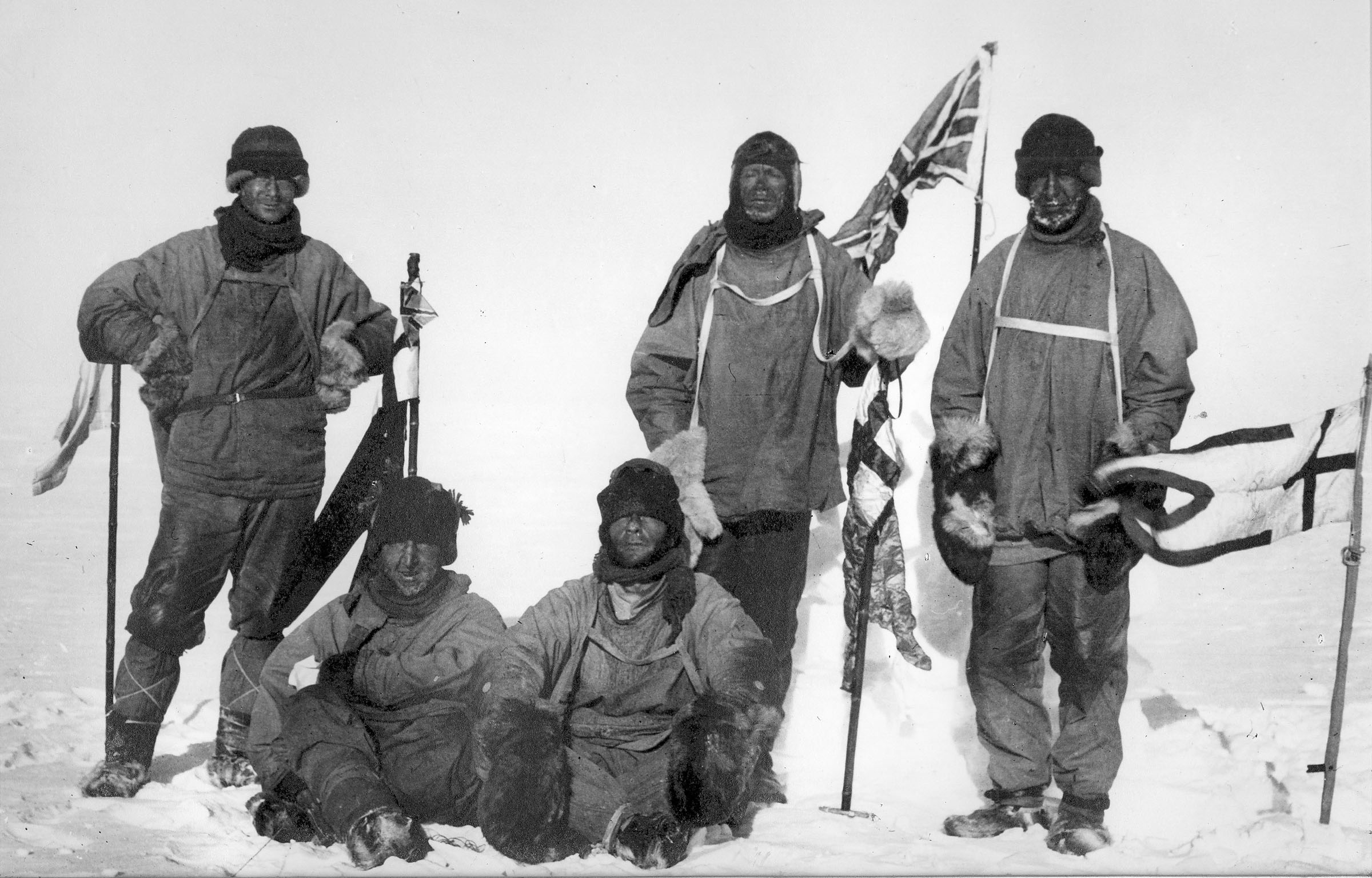
Scott and team near the South Pole, 17 January.

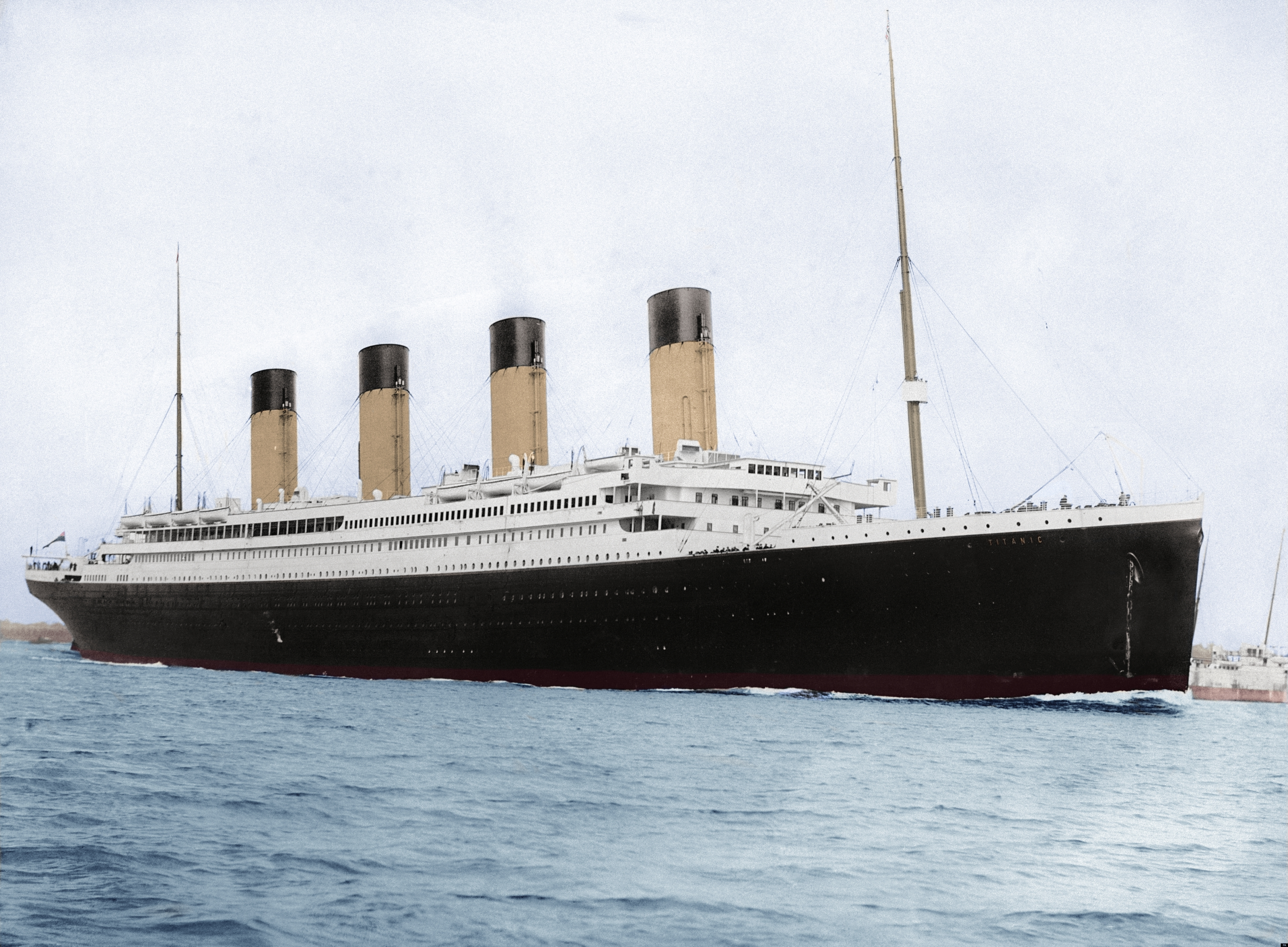
RMS Titanic departs from Southampton for the first and only time, 10 April.

- 1 January – General Post Office (GPO) takes over National Telephone Company.
- 17 January – British polar explorer Robert Falcon Scott and a team of four reach the South Pole to find that Roald Amundsen had beaten them to it.
- 31 January – G. K. Sowerby's drama Rutherford and Son premières at the Royal Court Theatre in London.
- 2 February – With Our King and Queen Through India, a 2 1/2-hour Kinemacolor feature film of the Delhi Durbar of 1911 made by Charles Urban, is first shown at the Scala Theatre, London.
- 26 February–6 April – National coal strike of 1912.
- 1 March – suffragettes smash shop windows in the West End of London, especially around Oxford Street.
- 16 March – Lawrence Oates, ill member of Scott's South Pole expedition leaves the tent saying, "I am just going outside and may be some time". He is not seen again.
- 19 March – minimum wage introduced for miners after national strike.
- 29 March – the remaining members of Scott's expedition die.
- 30 March – the University Boat Race on the Thames in London is abandoned after both crews sink.
- 1 April – the University Boat Race is restarted, and the race is won by Oxford by six lengths.
- 11 April – Irish Home Rule Bill introduced in the House of Commons, but fails to receive the support of the House of Lords.
- 13 April – the Royal Flying Corps (RFC) is established by royal charter.
- 14–15 April – the sinking of the Titanic: White Star liner RMS Titanic strikes an iceberg and sinks on her maiden voyage from the United Kingdom to the United States.
- 15 April – the syndicalist Daily Herald newspaper is first published on a permanent basis.
- 22 April – English aviator Denys Corbett Wilson completes the first aeroplane crossing of the Irish Sea, from Goodwick in Wales to Crane near Enniscorthy in Ireland.
- 24 April – Barnsley wins the FA Cup.
- April/May – thousands of Jewish workers in London's garment trade in the West End strike, followed by thousands more in the East End inspired by Rudolf Rocker.
- May – Liberal Unionist Party formally merges into the Conservative And Unionist Party.
- 2 May–3 July – Board of Trade inquiry into the sinking of the RMS Titanic.
- 5 May–22 July – Great Britain and Ireland compete at the Olympics in Stockholm and win 10 gold, 15 silver and 16 bronze medals.
- 13 May – the Air Battalion Royal Engineers becomes the Military Wing of the Royal Flying Corps.
- 9 July – Cadeby Main pit disaster: two underground explosions in the South Yorkshire Coalfield kill 91 miners.
- 15 July – the National Insurance Act 1911 comes into force introducing National Insurance payments.
- 27 July – the Blenheim Unionist rally: Bonar Law, leader of the Conservative Party in opposition, makes a defiant speech at a massive Irish Unionist rally at Blenheim Palace against Irish Home Rule implying support for armed resistance to it in Ulster.
- August
  - Cabinet ministers accused of corruption in the Marconi scandal.
  - Wettest British August on record.
- 10 August – Frank McClean flies a Short Brothers floatplane up the River Thames between the upper and lower parts of Tower Bridge and underneath London Bridge.
- 25–27 August – the wet summer climaxes in a major rainstorm across England, causing floods particularly in Norfolk and Norwich.
- September – the tradition of the Blackpool Illuminations begins.
- 31 October – Robert Baden-Powell marries Olave St Clair Soames at Parkstone.
- 5 November – establishment of the British Board of Film Censors.
- 12 November – the bodies of Captain Scott and his team are found in the Antarctic.
- 27 November – concerted suffragette attacks on pillar boxes.
- 18 December – Piltdown Man, thought to be the fossilised remains of a hitherto unknown form of early human, presented to the Geological Society of London. It is revealed to be a hoax in 1953.

=== Undated ===
- Sir Rufus Isaacs, the Attorney General, becomes the first believing Jew appointed to the Cabinet.
- Judges' Rules are issued by the judges of the King's Bench to give English police forces guidance on the procedures to be followed in detaining and questioning suspects.
- Glucozade, the predecessor of Lucozade, is first produced.

== Publications ==
- Walter de la Mare's The Listeners, and Other Poems.
- Ethel M. Dell's first novel The Way of an Eagle.
- Arthur Conan Doyle's novel The Lost World.
- The first Georgian Poetry anthology Georgian Poetry 1911–12 edited by Edward Marsh.
- Alfred North Whitehead and Bertrand Russell's book Principia Mathematica vol. 2, one of the most important and seminal works in mathematical logic and philosophy.

== Births ==
- 9 January – Basil Langton, English actor, director and photographer (died 2003)
- 16 January – Norman Gash, historian (born in India; died 2009)
- 17 January – Edward Fennessy, electrical engineer (died 2009)
- 19 January – Margaret Wingfield, politician (died 2002)
- 20 January – Reg Smith, footballer and football manager (died 2004)
- 21 January – Laurence Whistler, poet and artist (died 2000)
- 3 February – John Bryan Ward-Perkins, archaeologist (died 1981)
- 6 February – Christopher Hill, historian (died 2003)
- 8 February
  - Ann Lambton, historian (died 2008)
  - Richard Southern, historian (died 2001)
- 11 February – Roy Fuller, poet and novelist (died 1991)
- 12 February
  - Eric Barker, comedy actor (died 1990)
  - Gabrielle Brune, actress (died 2005)
- 13 February
  - Jenny Laird, actress (died 2001)
  - Margaretta Scott, actress (died 2005)
- 19 February – Ursula Torday, writer (died 1997)
- 20 February – Olive Cook, writer and artist (died 2002)
- 27 February – Lawrence Durrell, writer (born in India; died 1990)
- 29 February – Derek Tangye, author (died 1996)
- 3 March – Mary Keir, Welsh supercentenarian (died 2024)
- 4 March – Judith Furse, character actress (died 1974)
- 5 March – David Astor, editor of The Observer newspaper (died 2001)
- 9 March
  - Sir Roualeyn Cumming-Bruce, 88, barrister and judge (died 2000)
  - Francis Cumming-Bruce, 8th Baron Thurlow, 101, diplomat, Governor and Commander-in-Chief of the Bahamas (1968–1972) (died 2013).
- 10 March
  - Muriel Angelus, actress (died 2004)
  - Frank Smithies, mathematician (died 2002)
- 14 March – Vernon Harrison, photographer (died 2001)
- 19 March – Bill Frankland, immunologist (died 2020)
- 21 March – Peter Bull, actor (died 1984)
- 23 March – Betty Astell, actress (died 2005)
- 25 March – Melita Norwood, née Sirnis, secret agent (died 2005)
- 27 March
  - James Callaghan, Prime Minister (died 2005)
  - John Crofton, medical pioneer (died 2009)
- 29 March – Constance Chapman, actress (died 2003)
- 5 April
  - John Le Mesurier, actor (died 1983)
  - Bill Roberts, athlete (died 2001)
- 18 April – Sandy Glen, explorer (died 2004)
- 21 April – Robin Richmond, musician and radio presenter (died 1998)
- 22 April – Kathleen Ferrier, contralto (died 1953)
- 4 May – Frith Banbury, actor and theatre director (died 2008)
- 7 May – Frank Reginald Carey, fighter pilot (died 2004)
- 10 May – Edward Gardner, politician (died 2001)
- 17 May – Percy M. Young, musicologist and composer (died 2004)
- 19 May – Noel Mander, organ builder (died 2005)
- 22 May – Herbert C. Brown, chemist, Nobel Prize laureate (died 2004)
- 23 May – Betty Astell, actress (died 2005)
- 28 May – Derek Cooper, soldier and campaigner for refugees (died 2007)
- 30 May – Julian Symons, writer and poet (died 1994)
- 31 May – Alfred Deller, countertenor (died 1979)
- 8 June – Wilhelmina Barns-Graham, artist (died 2004)
- 9 June – Gerald James Whitrow, mathematician and cosmologist (died 2000)
- 10 June – William Gordon Harris, civil engineer (died 2005)
- 16 June – Enoch Powell, politician (died 1998)
- 19 June – Archie Butterworth, racing car designer (died 2005)
- 20 June
  - Anthony Buckeridge, children's author (died 2004)
  - Olive Hirst, advertising agent (died 1994)
- 23 June – Alan Turing, mathematician (died 1954)
- 24 June
  - Brian Johnston, BBC cricket commentator (died 1994)
  - Mary Wesley, novelist (died 2002)
- 30 June – Arthur Walter James, journalist and Liberal Party politician (died 2015)
- 3 July – John Buchan Ross, Royal Air Force officer (died 2009)
- 11 July – Peta Taylor, cricketer (died 1989)
- 12 July – Joseph Gold, lawyer (died 2000)
- 15 July – Helen Roberts, singer and actress (died 2010)
- 17 July – Michael Gilbert, lawyer and crime fiction writer (died 2006)
- 20 July – John Vivian Dacie, haematologist (died 2005)
- 21 July – Tommy Butler, Detective Chief Superintendent (died 1970)
- 29 July – Myrtle Devenish, actress (died 2007)
- 30 July – Anne Ridler, poet and editor (died 2001)
- 31 July – Peter John Stephens, writer (died 2002)
- 5 August – Peggy Guido, archaeologist (died 1994)
- 7 August – Paul Hawkins, politician (died 2002)
- 13 August – Terence Wilmot Hutchison, economist (died 2007)
- 15 August – Wendy Hiller, actress (died 2003)
- 16 August – Ted Drake, footballer (died 1995)
- 17 August – Margaret Scriven, tennis player (died 2001)
- 18 August – Josephine Barnes, gynaecologist (died 1999)
- 26 August
  - John Tinniswood, supercentenarian, world’s oldest living man from 29 June 2024 to 25 November 2024 (died 2024)
  - Alex Stuart-Menteth, naval officer (died 2000)
- 28 August – George Alcock, astronomer (died 2000)
- 1 September – Gwynfor Evans, Welsh politician (died 2005)
- 2 September – David Daiches, literary critic (died 2005)
- 11 September – Robin Jenkins, novelist (died 2005)
- 18 September – Frank Farmer, physicist (died 2004)
- 21 September – Ian MacGregor, industrialist (died 1998)
- 24 September – Ian Serraillier, novelist and poet (died 1994)
- 28 September – Peter Finch, actor (died 1977)
- 2 October – Eric Wilson, soldier (died 2008)
- 10 October – Clare Fell, archaeologist (died 2002)
- 12 October – Doreen Gorsky, politician and television producer (died 2001)
- 24 October – Peter Gellhorn, composer and conductor (born in Germany; died 2004)
- 27 October – Grahame Farr, maritime historian (died 1983)
- 28 October – Richard Doll, epidemiologist (died 2005)
- 30 October
  - Preston Lockwood, actor and writer (died 1996)
  - Ian Robertson, Lord Robertson, judge (died 2005)
- 5 November – Paul Dehn, screenwriter and poet (died 1976)
- 6 November – Toke Townley, actor (died 1984)
- 7 November – Alex Henshaw, test pilot (died 2007)
- 12 November – Kenneth Porter, Air Force officer (died 2003)
- 13 November – John Hill, politician (died 2007)
- 18 November – Hilda Nickson, novelist (died 1977)
- 25 November – Francis Durbridge, playwright and author (died 1998)
- 14 December – Desmond Fitzpatrick, general (died 2002)
- 27 December
  - Conroy Maddox, painter (died 2005)
  - Cyril Philips, historian (died 2005)

== Deaths ==
- 7 January – Sophia Jex-Blake, physician and feminist (born 1840)
- 14 January – Samuel Johnson, railway locomotive engineer (Midland Railway) (born 1831)
- 24 January – James Allen, self-help writer and poet (born 1864)
- 29 January – Alexander Duff, 1st Duke of Fife, Scottish aristocrat and politician (born 1849)
- 10 February – Joseph Lister, surgeon (born 1827)
- 13 February – Princess Victor of Hohenlohe-Langenburg (born 1832)
- 17 February – Edgar Evans, Welsh-born naval officer, member of the Scott expedition to the South Pole (born 1876)
- 21 February – Osborne Reynolds, physicist (born 1842)
- 28 February – Bill Storer, footballer and cricketer (born 1867)
- 1 March – George Grossmith, actor and comic writer (born 1847)
- 17 March – Lawrence Oates, army officer, member of the Scott expedition (born 1880)
- 29 March – remaining members of the Scott expedition:
  - Henry Robertson Bowers, Scottish-born naval officer (born 1883)
  - Robert Falcon Scott, naval officer and explorer (born 1868)
  - Edward Wilson, physician and naturalist (born 1872)
- 15 April – some victims of the sinking of the RMS Titanic:
  - Thomas Andrews, Jr., shipbuilder (born 1873)
  - Dai Bowen, boxer (born 1891)
  - Thomas Byles, Catholic priest (born 1870)
  - Sidney Leslie Goodwin, youngest victim (born 1910)
  - Wallace Hartley, ship's band leader and violinist (born 1878)
  - William McMaster Murdoch, First Officer (born 1873)
  - Jack Phillips, ship's senior wireless officer (born 1887)
  - Edward Smith, ship's captain (born 1850)
  - William Thomas Stead, campaigning journalist (born 1849)
- 18 April – Frederick Seddon, poisoner, hanged (born 1872)
- 20 April – Bram Stoker, writer (born 1847)
- 24 April – Justin McCarthy, Irish nationalist politician, historian and novelist (born 1830)
- 21 May – Sir Julius Wernher, businessman and art collector (born 1850 in Germany)
- 13 June – Alice Diehl, novelist and concert pianist (born 1844)
- 24 June – Sir George White, field marshal (born 1835)
- 25 June – Sir Lawrence Alma-Tadema, painter (born 1836 in the Netherlands)
- 2 July – Tom Richardson, cricketer (born 1870)
- 20 July – Andrew Lang, Scottish poet, novelist and critic (born 1844)
- 31 July – Allan Octavian Hume, civil servant and ornithologist in India (born 1829)
- 13 August – Octavia Hill, social reformer (born 1838)
- 20 August
  - William Booth, founder of the Salvation Army (born 1829)
  - Walter Goodman, painter, illustrator and author (born 1838)
- 1 September – Samuel Coleridge-Taylor, composer (born 1875)
- 6 September – Sir Charles Gough, general and Victoria Cross recipient (born 1832)
- 28 September – Frederick Richards, admiral (born 1833)
- 30 September – Frances Allitsen, song composer (born 1848)
- 8 November – Dugald Drummond, Scottish-born railway locomotive engineer (born 1840)
- 17 November – Richard Norman Shaw, architect (born 1831)
- 25 November – Sir Edward Moss, theatrical impresario (born 1852)
- 14 December – Belgrave Edward Sutton Ninnis, explorer and officer, lost on Antarctic expedition (born 1887)

== See also ==
- List of British films before 1920
