= 1932 Yugoslavian Senate election =

Senate elections were held in Yugoslavia for the first time on 3 January 1932, following the election of the National Assembly in November 1931 after a new constitution was promulgated in September 1931. Half of the 92 members were elected, with the other half appointed by King Alexander.

== Electoral system ==
Of the 46 elected senators, nine were elected in Sava Banovina, eight in Danube Banovina, five in Drina Banovina, Morava Banovina and Vardar Banovina, four in Drava Banovina, three in Littoral Banovina, Vrbas Banovina and Zeta Banovina and one in Belgrade.

== Elected members ==
Constituency	Elected members
Belgrade	Jovan Stanković
Drava banovina	Vladimir Ravnihar
Drava banovina	Miroslav Ploj
Drava banovina	Janko Rajar
Drava banovina	Fran Novak
Drina Banovina	Atanasije Šola
Drina Banovina	Pavle Vujić
Drina Banovina	Mateja Popović
Drina Banovina	Šerif Arnautović
Drina Banovina	Stjepan Janković
Danube Banovina	Kosta Timotijević
Danube Banovina	Stanojlo Vukčević
Danube Banovina	Emil Gavrila
Danube Banovina	Milan Marjanović
Danube Banovina	Stevan Mihaldžić
Danube Banovina	Milutin Petrović
Danube Banovina	Antun Vidaković
Danube Banovina	Milan L. Popović
Littoral Banovina	Nikola Preka
Littoral Banovina	Uroš Desnica
Littoral Banovina	Ivo Mastrović
Morava Banovina	Dimitrije Ilidžanović
Morava Banovina	Miloje Jovanović
Morava Banovina	Vladimir Mitrović
Morava Banovina	Milan Simonović
Morava Banovina	Krsta Radovanović
Sava Banovina	Stanko Šverljuga
Sava Banovina	Marko Kostrenčić
Sava Banovina	Ljudevit Gaj
Sava Banovina	Petar Teslić
Sava Banovina	Frane Kukuljević Sakcinski
Sava Banovina	Tomo Jalžabetić
Sava Banovina	Ljubomir Tomašević
Sava Banovina	Ivan Gmajner
Sava Banovina	Petar Dobrinić
Vardar Banovina	Vasa Bogojević
Vardar Banovina	Petar Kostić
Vardar Banovina	Spiro Hadži Ristić
Vardar Banovina	Trajko Hadži Bošković
Vardar Banovina	Xhafer Sylejmani
Vrbas Banovina	Pavle Ubavić
Vrbas Banovina	Vaso Glušac
Vrbas Banovina	Asim Bey Alibegović
Zeta Banovina	Marko Radulović
Zeta Banovina	Aleksandar Stanišić
Zeta Banovina	Gavrilo Cerović
Source: Politika
