= D65 =

D65 may refer to:

- Illuminant D65, a commonly used standard illuminant defined by the International Commission on Illumination
- Greek destroyer Nearchos (D65)
- HMS Codrington (D65), a 1930 A-class destroyer of the Royal Navy
- HMS St. James (D65), a 1946 Battle-class destroyer of the Royal Navy
- SPS Blas de Lezo (D65), a Spanish Navy ship
- INS Chennai (D65), an Indian Navy ship
- the former designation for the Slovakian R1 expressway
- D 65 road (United Arab Emirates) (Al Manara Road), a road passing in Umm Suqeim
