= HMS Aldenham =

British Hunt-class escort destroyer

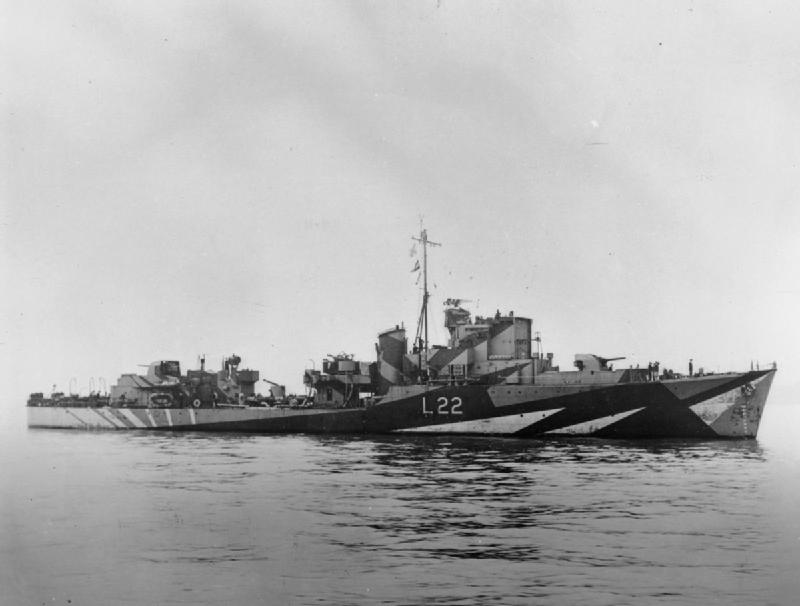
- Aldenham in March 1942

History

United Kingdom
- Name: HMS Aldenham
- Ordered: 4 July 1940
- Builder: Cammell Laird, Birkenhead
- Yard number: J 3766
- Laid down: 22 August 1940
- Launched: 27 August 1941
- Completed: 5 February 1942
- Identification: Pennant number: L22
- Fate: Sunk in the Adriatic Sea, 14 December 1944, at 44°30′N 14°50′E

General characteristics
- Class & type: Type III Hunt-class destroyer
- Displacement: 1,050 long tons (1,070 t) standard; 1,435 long tons (1,458 t) full load
- Length: 85.3 m (279 ft 10 in) o/a
- Beam: 10.16 m (33 ft 4 in)
- Draught: 3.51 m (11 ft 6 in)
- Propulsion: 2 Admiralty 3-drum boilers; 2 shaft Parsons geared turbines, 19,000 shp (14,000 kW)
- Speed: 27 knots (31 mph; 50 km/h); 25.5 kn (29.3 mph; 47.2 km/h) full
- Range: 2,350 nmi (4,350 km) at 20 kn (37 km/h)
- Complement: 168
- Armament: 4 × QF 4 in Mark XVI guns on twin mounts Mk. XIX; 4 × QF 2 pdr Mk. VIII on quad mount MK.VII; 2 × 20 mm Oerlikons on single mounts P Mk. III; 2 × 21 in (533 mm) torpedo tubes; 110 depth charges, 4 throwers, 3 racks

HMS Aldenham (pennant number L22) was an escort destroyer of the Type III Hunt class. The Royal Navy ordered its construction in July 1940. Upon completion in February 1942, she was deployed to convoy escort duty. Aldenham is one of the ships credited with the sinking of the U-587 on 27 March 1942. After circumnavigating Africa, she joined the Mediterranean Fleet, escorting convoys between Alexandria, Malta and Tobruk. She took part in the Allied invasion of Sicily, landings at Salerno and Anzio, the Dodecanese campaign and Operation Dragoon before being assigned to the Adriatic campaign.

On 14 December 1944, Aldenham was sunk by a naval mine in the Adriatic Sea off Pag Island after she led a Royal Navy force in a bombardment mission against targets on the island of Pag and near the town of Karlobag in support of the Yugoslav Partisans. Although the rest of the force came to pick up survivors, cold weather and severe damage to Aldenham permitted the rescue of only 63 of her crew. Her wreck, broken in two by the explosion, was first discovered by specialists of Yugoslav Navy in 1974, and documentary about search and discovery was made by TV Beograd. The wreck has been declared a war grave, where 126 crew members and three partisans aboard Aldenham at the time of the mining died. She was the last Royal Navy destroyer lost in World War II.

== Design and construction ==
Aldenham was a Royal Navy Type III Hunt-class destroyer. She had an overall length of 85.34 metres (280 feet 0 inches), a beam of 9.45 metres (31 feet 0 inches) and a maximum draught of three metres (9 feet 10 inches). Aldenham had a standard displacement of 1,050 long tons (1,070 tonnes), and a full load of 1,435 long tons (1,458 tonnes). Her two Parsons geared steam turbines drove two propeller shaft. Steam was supplied by two Admiralty three-drum water-tube boilers. The turbines were rated at 13,970 kilowatts (18,730 shp) and gave Aldenham a speed of 28.3 knots (52.4 km/h; 32.6 mph) during sea trials, but she achieved up to 27 knots (50 kilometres per hour; 31 miles per hour) on deployments.

Aldenham was armed with four quick-firing four-inch (102 mm) Mk XVI naval guns on twin mounts, four anti-aircraft 40-millimetre (1.6 in) QF 2-pounder naval guns and three Oerlikon 20 mm cannons. She also had two 21-inch (533 mm) torpedo tubes, and 70–100 depth charges deployed by four throwers and two chutes.

The ship was ordered on 4 July 1940. She was laid down by Cammell Laird shipyard in Birkenhead on 22 August 1940 as construction project J 3766. Aldenham was launched on 27 August 1941 and completed on 5 February 1942.

== Service ==
Aldenham (Lieutenant Alex Stuart-Menteth) and its crew of 170 completed brief training at Scapa Flow before deploying for the first time on 21 March 1942, as a part of an Escort Group assigned to the convoy WS 17 sailing to the Cape of Good Hope. On 27 March, Aldenham, together with the Leamington, Grove and Volunteer, sank U-587 in the North Atlantic, due west of Ushant, France.

Circumnavigating Africa and transiting the Suez Canal accompanied by Grove, Aldenham joined the 5th Destroyer Flotilla in the Battle of the Mediterranean. She escorted 14 convoys there, protecting shipping between Alexandria, Malta and Tobruk. On 29 August 1942, she was assigned coastal bombardment duties, including the area of El Daba. Sources disagree which ships took part in the bombardment of El Daba itself. According to Jürgen Rohwer, Aldenham and Eridge were the only ships involved, while Paul Kemp places Eridge at the scene supported by fellow destroyers Croome and Hursley. Aldenham towed Eridge back to Alexandria after the latter ship was disabled by an Italian MTSM motor torpedo boat during the bombardment.

Aldenham was a part of an Allied blockade off Cap Bon in May 1943 and escorted landing craft during the Allied invasion of Sicily in July and the Salerno landings in September that year. She assisted Eskimo removing wounded when Eskimo was attacked and hit by the Luftwaffe on 15 July. Aldenham also took part in failed Dodecanese Campaign of 1944, when she sustained minor damage in an aircraft attack. After repairs in Alexandria, Aldenham saw action in Operation Shingle off Anzio, Italy, and escorted convoys between Oran, Algeria and Naples. She was based in Taranto in May, and transferred to Bari in June, before supporting Operation Dragoon, protecting landing craft off southern France. Afterwards, she sailed again to the Adriatic Sea, joining a Royal Navy flotilla fighting the Adriatic Campaign.

The Royal Navy Adriatic flotilla consisted of Aldenham, Atherstone, Avon Vale, Lamerton, Lauderdale, Wheatland, Wilton, Brocklesby and Quantock. In late November 1944, the flotilla, led by Aldenham under Commander James Gerald Farrant, intercepted and captured German hospital ship Bonn (ex-Yugoslav steamship Šumadija). She and Atherstone bombarded German units deployed to the island of Rab on 9 December. The bombardment was in support of Yugoslav Partisans advance north along the eastern coast of the Adriatic, capturing the coast and islands from retreating German forces.

What became Aldenham's final deployment began on 14 December 1944, when she and Atherstone sortied from a Royal Navy base at Ist Island and anchored off the western coast of Pag Island, north of Zadar, to bombard an artillery battery near Karlobag and other military targets on Pag. Because of poor visibility, the artillery observers on Pag directed destroyers to strike the Pag Island objectives first. Each destroyer fired 500 four-inch (102 mm) shells against bunkers and barracks on the island between 09:00 and 11:20. The town of Pag itself was targeted by the destroyers for an hour at 14:00, while Aldenham alone engaged the battery at Karlobag at approximately 13:00 and again before 15:00 as visibility improved, firing 200 shells against that target. At 15:00, the destroyers started their return to Ist with Aldenham in the lead and Atherstone following her at 20 knots (37 kilometres per hour; 23 miles per hour).

== Sinking ==
As Aldenham was making a turn at a position north of the islet of Škrda, to sail between islands of Planik and Olib, she hit a mine that exploded under her engine room. The ship broke in two and her bow sank quickly, followed by her stern a little later, at 15:29. Cold weather hampered rescue efforts by Atherstone and accompanying Motor Launches ML 238 and HDML 1162, and only 58 seamen and five officers, including Farrant, were pulled out of the sea. 126 crewmen died, as well as a wounded partisan transported from Pag for medical treatment and a partisan liaison officer, Colonel Ivan Preradović. Aldenham was the last Royal Navy destroyer lost in World War II.

Her wreck, broken in two by the explosion, was first discovered by specialists of Yugoslav Navy in 1974, and documentary about search and discovery was made by TV Beograd.

A portion of the surviving crew revisited the site on 14 December 1984, but the shipwreck was not located until 15 years later. In 1999, Italian wreck divers located a 30-metre (98 ft) long bow section one nautical mile (1.9 kilometres) off Škrda. It lies on the port side, at a depth of 86 metres (282 feet), but it is normally obscured by silt stirred up by trawling further north in the Kvarner Gulf. The aft section of the ship was discovered in 2000 through testimony of a fisherman from Pag. It was found closer to Škrda, approximately 700 metres (2,300 feet) away from the bow section. Aldenham's boilers and propellers were still operating as the ship sank, and the section struck the silty seafloor at a depth of 82 metres (269 feet), with her keel on top. Her rudder is now at a depth of 67 metres (220 feet). The wreck was declared a British war grave, and forms a part of "the Ghost Fleet of Pag" together with wrecks of Kriegsmarine destroyer TA20 (ex-Italian Audace), corvettes UJ 202 and UJ 208 (ex-Italian Melpómene and Spingarda) sunk in the action of 1 November 1944, and World War I wrecks of Austro-Hungarian steamships SS Albanien and SS Euterpe.

== Remembrance ==
Annual memorial services are held by the HMS Aldenham Association in Aldenham Church of St John The Baptist each December. The church contains a stained glass window dedicated to Aldenham, and a Book of Remembrance is displayed in front of the stained glass window, along with a White Ensign. The stained glass window memorial was unveiled on the occasion of the 50th anniversary of sinking of Aldenham.
