= Albert Kramer =

Slovenian and Yugoslavian politician and lawyer

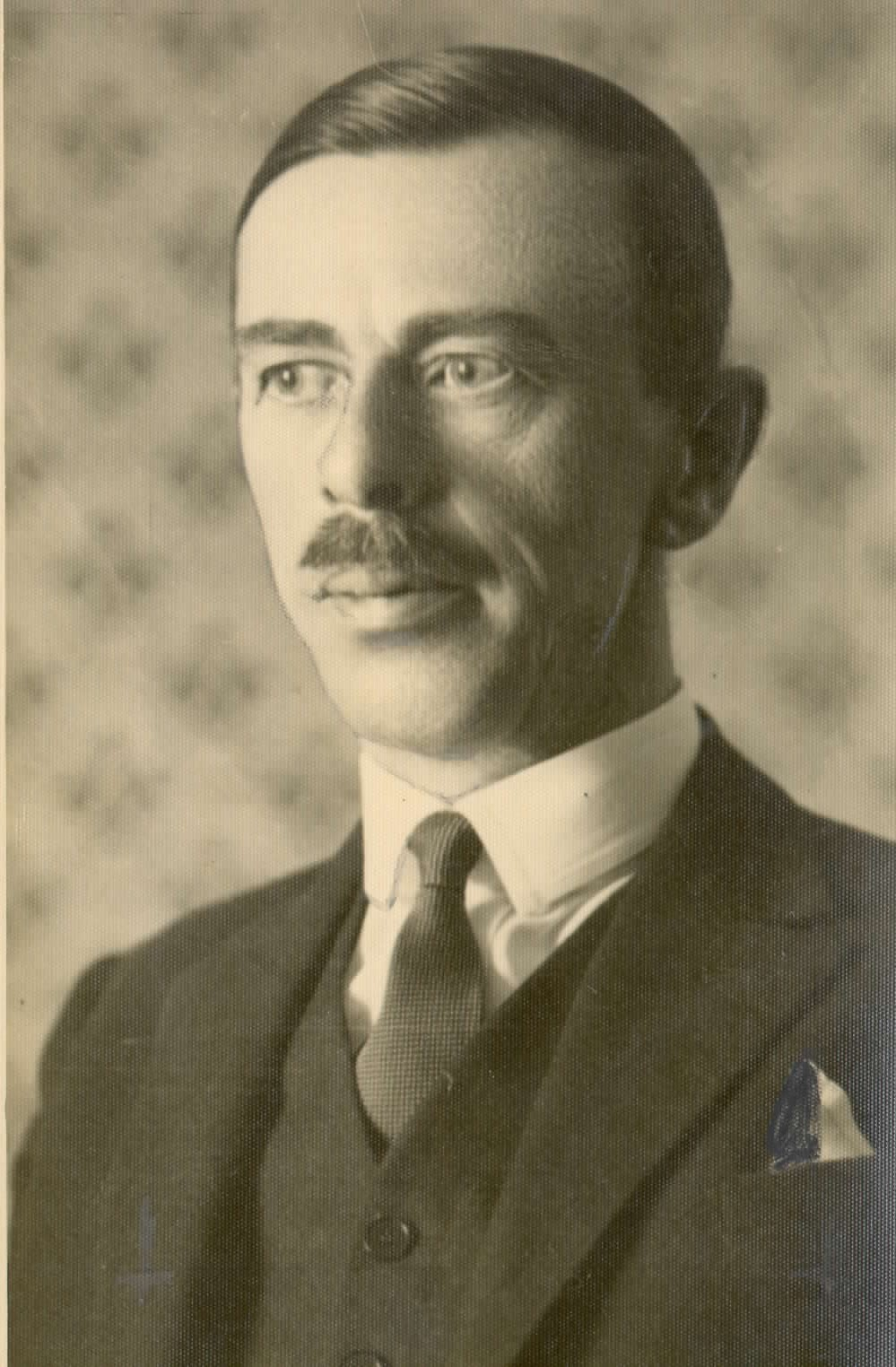
- Born: 6 October 1882; Trbovlje, Duchy of Styria, Austria-Hungary (now Slovenia)
- Died: 27 May 1943 (aged 60); Ljubljana, Province of Ljubljana, Kingdom of Italy (now Slovenia)
- Education: Charles University
- Occupations: Politician, lawyer, journalist
- Political party: Popular Progressive Party; Democratic Party (from 1918); Yugoslav National Party (from 1929)

Albert Kramer (6 October 1882 – 27 May 1943) was a Slovenian and Yugoslavian politician and lawyer.

Kramer studied philosophy and law at the University of Graz and the Charles University from 1903 until 1910 before working as a paralegal and correspondent of Ljubljana-based Slovenski narod and Trieste-based Edinost in Vienna. In 1912–1913, Kramer travelled to Condominium of Bosnia, Croatia-Slavonia and Dalmatia, establishing contacts with South Slavic political leaders in those areas of Austria-Hungary supporting the Yugoslavist goals. In 1917, he established contacts with the leading Slovenian liberal politician Gregor Žerjav and became the leader of the Slovenian Popular Progressive Party. In 1918, in the period leading to the dissolution of Austria-Hungary in the final days of the World War I, Kramer became a member of the Zagreb-based National Council of Slovenes, Croats and Serbs and its secretary for the Slovene Lands and Istria. The council was an interim representative and legislative body of the South Slavs living in Austria-Hungary and it declared the short-lived State of Slovenes, Croats and Serbs independent. Kramer was a member of the council's delegation dispatched to Prince Regent Alexander of Serbia to request unification of the Kingdom of Serbia and the State of Slovenes, Croats and Serbs from the regent. The regent proclaimed the Kingdom of Serbs, Croats and Slovenes (later renamed Yugoslavia) on 1 December 1918

In the new kingdom, Kramer was among the founders of the Democratic Party and a member of its central committee in Belgrade. He took part in establishment of the Temporary National Representation, the interim parliament of the Kingdom of Serbs, Croats and Slovenes. Kramer drew up the list of representatives of the National Council of Slovenes, Croats and Serbs to be appointed to the Temporary National Representation on authorisation by the regent acting as the head of the state. In the 1927 Kingdom of Serbs, Croats and Slovenes parliamentary election, Kramer won the parliamentary seat in the Assembly of the Kingdom of Serbs, Croats and Slovenes representing Ljubljana election district. After the end of the Royal dictatorship of 1929 which suspended the parliamentary work, Kramer was re-elected in the 1931 Yugoslavian parliamentary election. In 1918, Kramer was the government minister for the Constituent Assembly and harmonisation of laws and the minister of trade and industry in 1919–1920. In early 1931, Kramer was the Yugoslav ambassador to Czechoslovakia before becoming the minister of construction in 1931, and the minister of trade in 1932. In the 1935 Yugoslavian Senate election, Kramer was elected as a representative of Drava Banovina.

== Sources ==
- "Јуче су извршени допунски избори за сенат" [Senate By-election Held Yesterday]. Politika (in Serbian). 4 February 1935. p. 2. ISSN 0350-4395.
- Pirjevec, Avgust (2013). "Kramer, albert (1882–1943)". Slovenski biografski leksikon (in Slovenian). Ljubljana: Slovenian Academy of Sciences and Arts.
- Ramet, Sabrina P. (2006). The Three Yugoslavias: State-Building and Legitimation, 1918–2005. Bloomington: Indiana University Press. ISBN 978-0-253-34656-8.
