= Škrda =

Island in Croatia

Otok Škrda
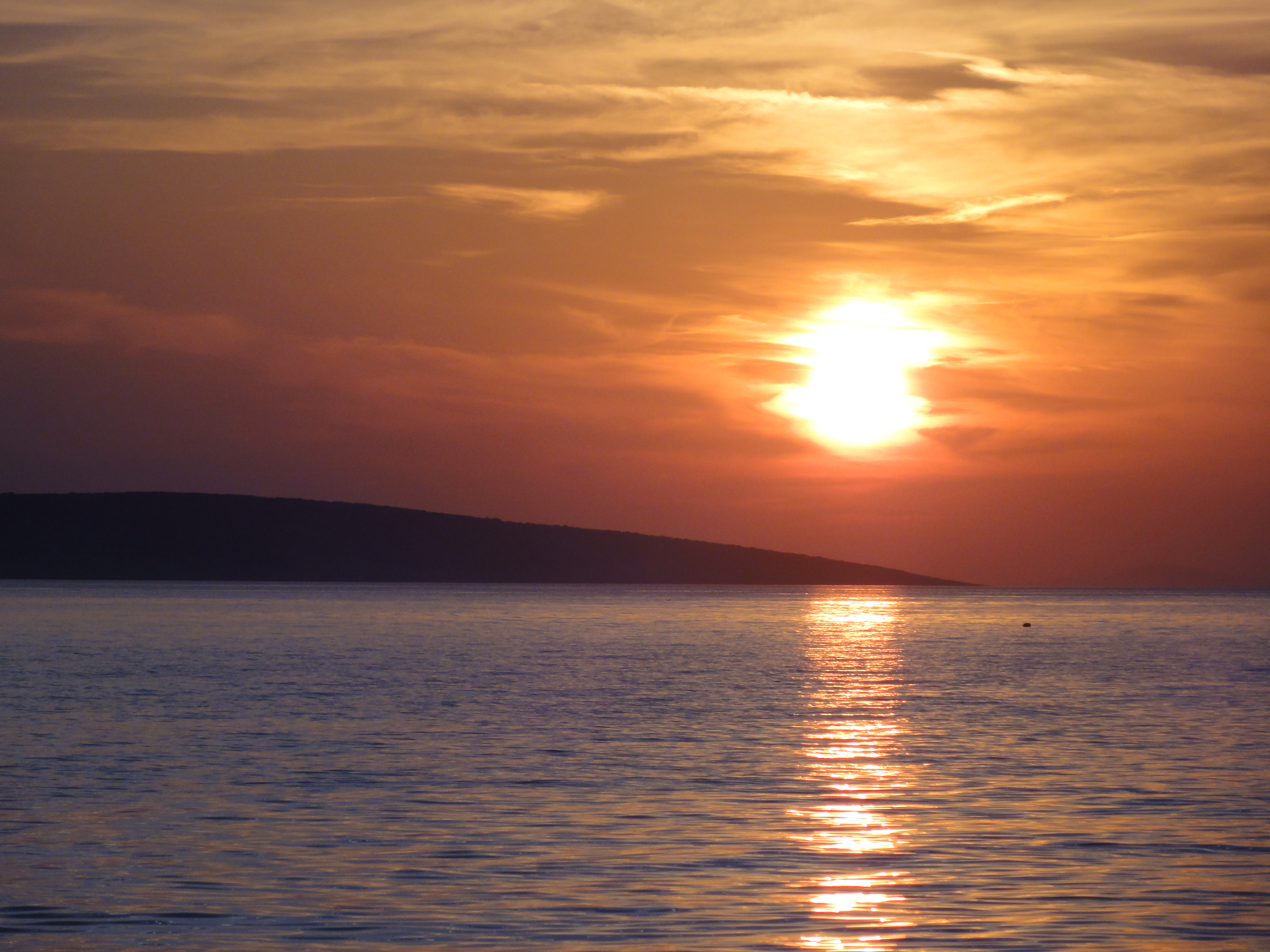
- Škrda from Pag

- Location within Croatia
- Interactive map of Otok Škrda

Geography
- Location: Adriatic Sea
- Coordinates: 44.478855°N 14.860146°E
- Area: 2.05 km^{2} (0.79 sq mi)
- Coastline: 7.177 km (4.4596 mi)

Administration
- Croatia
- County: Zadar County

Demographics
- Population: 0 (2017)

Škrda, or Otok Škrda, is an uninhabited Croatian island in the Adriatic Sea with an area of 2.05 km^{2}, and 7.177 km of coastline, located southwest of Pag. British escort destroyer HMS Aldenham was sunk by a naval mine near the island in December 1944.
