= Old District Building, Niš =

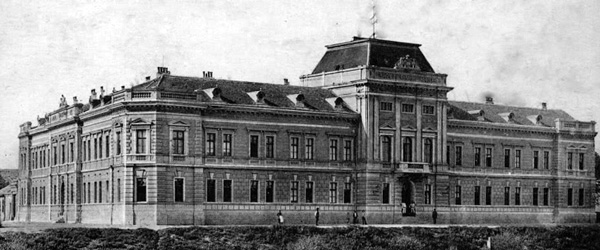
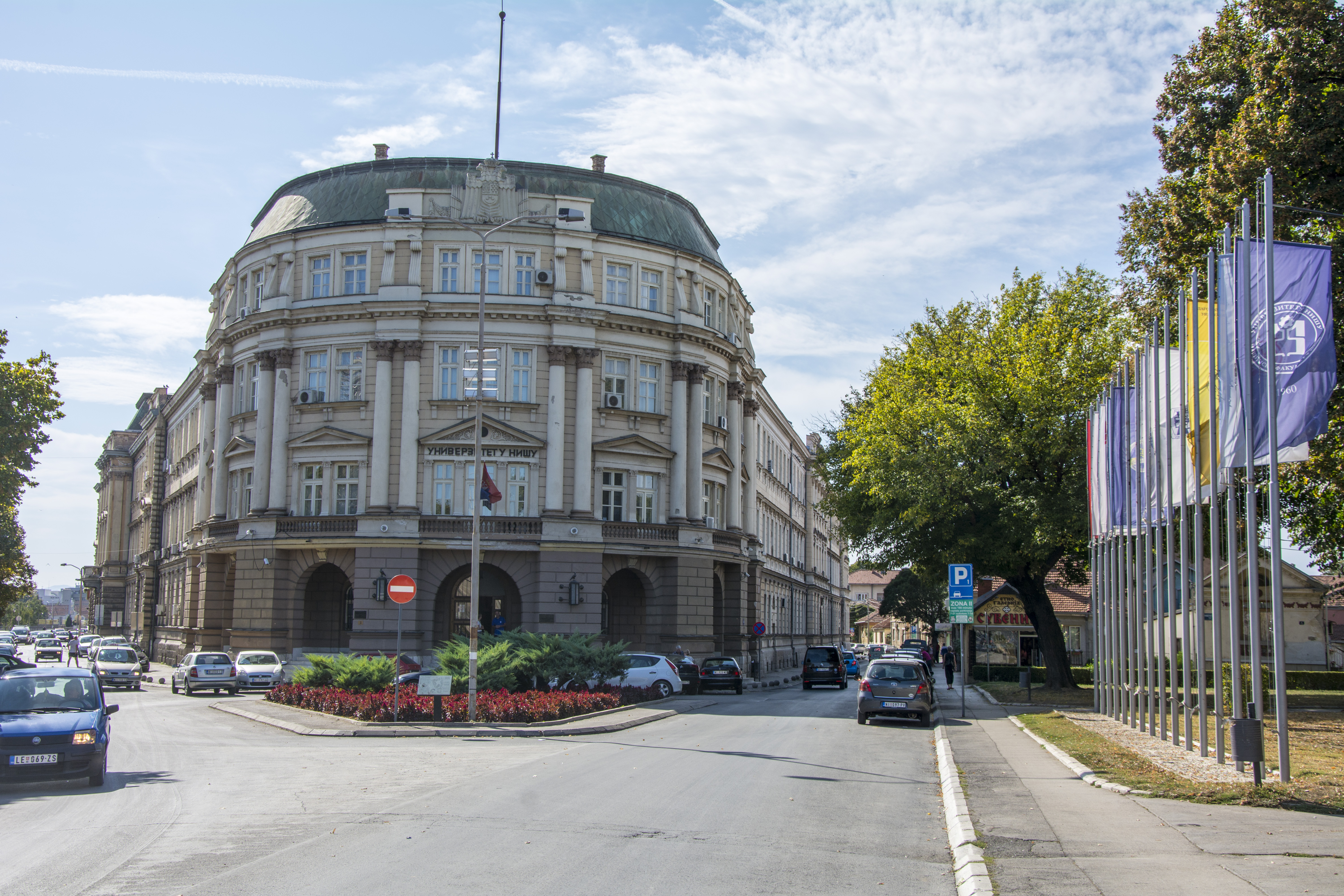
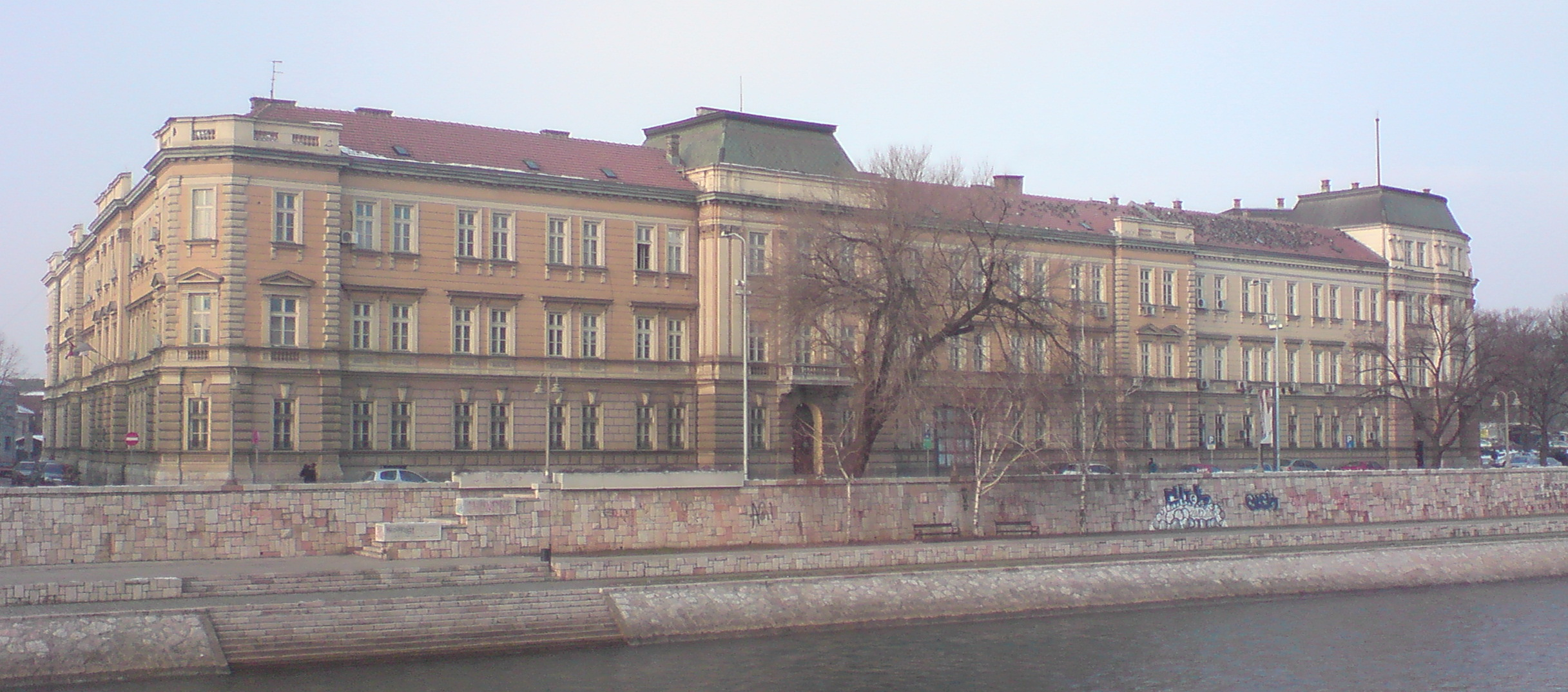
Old district offices

The building of the old district offices in Niš (Serbian Cyrillic: Зграда старог Начелства у Нишу) is located on the quay Mike Paligorića and Šumatovačka streets in the city of Niš in southern Serbia. Today this building bears the status of cultural heritage of great importance.

== History ==
In the vicinity of Niš Fortress, on the quay Mika Paligorića 2 and Šumatovačka street, facing toward the river Nišava, is located the building of the old district offices in Niš. After the liberation from Ottomans in 1878. the building was built in four years. The building was erected as facility that is with its position, size, style characteristics, represent the most monumental, the most representative public building in the former Niš. It was built by the plans of the Viennese architect, whose name remained unknown until today.

This building was important, among other things, because of connection with numerous important historical events. In the period from 26 July 1914, to 16 October in 1915, this building has had the office of the President of the Serbian government, Nikola Pašić. Exactly here was on 28 July 1914. received a telegram, by which Austria-Hungary declared war on Serbia, which was also the formal beginning of the First World War.

European rulers of Austria, Germany, and Bulgaria were watched from the balcony of this building, the last parade, of their military units, before their big defeat in the First World War.

After the war, the building remains still under the district offices. District offices, was at that time, contained besides district from Niš, also five more districts. Increasing of the entire administrative apparatus, has led to the need to expand of office space within the building.

Today, this building is also location for University, University library, Chamber of Commerce and the Institute for the Protection of Cultural Monuments of Niš. Institute for the Protection of Cultural Monuments of Niš decided in 1972. decides to give an official proclamation on building of the old district offices, as cultural monuments.

== The appearance of the building ==
Construction of the first phase (two tractors with ground floor and first floor), for the purposes of District offices in Niš, Police and Court in Niš. Originally, the building consisted of a ground floor and first floor, with tract length of 65 meters and 50 meters, compared to today's street Dobrička. building was represented at that time, undoubtedly the first and unique building built at Niš, with massive walls, and in a solid way solved mezzanine structure. The building of the old the district offices in Niš was visibly stood out from the oriental architecture of the former Niš's architecture, with its western-europien style. Carpentry at building was constructed at one of Vienna's workshop, as evidenced indicate by the lettering on the windows with the tag "VIEN".

At the entrance vestibule today stands preserved, although is hard to see, the a four coats of arms with symbols of the Kingdom of Serbia, carried at Seko technique. Tendencies at architecture, which were influenced by Renaissance, at the ground level was expressed on the facades of the rustic mortar, designed as an imitation of wide joints predominantly at horizontal rows. The ends of the facade Avant-corps from all sides remained largely emphasized and processed at imitation of the massive block. The building has pronounced details of the Avant-corps with prominent triangular tympanums.

The entire interior of the first floor has been designed in a dignified and representative way. On this way was solved the entire entrance hall, stairs, offices of the central government, and even a luxuriously designed apartments, build for governor and his staff. By the depth of the tract, going at direction of the yard, is located the central hall for official gatherings, modeled like an amphitheater. As for the exterior, compositional architecture repeated itself, with the same motifs, there is on the building, on existing tracts. The entrance porch of the building is emphasized, and can be reached by a staircase at shaped an amphitheater. The building consists of high ground floor, and two additional floors, with a basis in the form of elongated trapezoid, with a central courtyard. The building was academic composed, with the Renaissance approach to horizontal gradation of elements on wall canvas (from the rustic to the lower zones until the finely machined surfaces, rows of pillars, tympanum, portal, balcony, porch, on emphasized angular avant-corps). The interior, especially the large hall for meetings, owns a rich decoration with luxury items.

== Reconstruction ==
After the First World War in 1925., The building has been extended for one more floor. During the upgrading of the building, care was taken not just about fitting a new part at the existing architecture, but also on consolidating at within the existing whole. The present appearance of the building dates back to the 1935th year, when Niš was the center of Morava Banovina. The works were carried out according to the project of the engineer Petar Gajić.

Works on the reconstruction and restoration of the exterior of the building facade, beginning in 1976, ten years after the institution of the University of Niš begins to work. Before that, the facade was restored in a mid-fifties, and it was done very poorly, so the new reconstruction was inevitable. Wreath on the roof which is along with a storied upgraded in 1925, and is located in the old part of the building, it is worn out and deformed. As part of the finishing works on a building, there is an emphasized the institution caption "The University in Niš" together with the symbol sculptured in bronze.

In 1977. works continued on the building facades, along the entire quay, including the old part of the building, all the way to Dobrička street corners. Surface at the old part of the building are finished with painted darker shades, compared with those of the previous phase of work. In that way are sufficiently prominent the phase of the whole block as a whole, while at the same time are stressing the symmetry of the oldest part of the building.

In 1986. works are continued on the sector from the Dobrička and Šumatovačka street, which include both street tract, respectively the entire city blocks of 68 + 90 (158m). The works were here also performed by the same principle as well as the sections of the previous phase. It can be concluded that reconstruction of facade elements was carried out on the 70% surface of the building. The restoration was completed by processing of the facades. The restoration has included a replacement of old sheet metal, then covering of the roof area, worn out sheet metal in every even the most inaccessible parts of the building, around roof area.

University of Nis, is as a legal entity invested in conducting of works on polishing the external appearance of the building, including with the restoration of facades, from the very beginning of work in 1976., until the very end in 1986. As supervision during construction works in all sectors was the Institute for Protection of Cultural Monuments of Niš.

Construction work that include yard decoration and interior decoration were completed in 1987. The works were performed in the area of the closed part of the yard, in total surface area of about 740 m2. also should be singled out a representative decoration internal hall of the university library and the Regional Chamber of Commerce.

== See also ==
- Niš Fortress
