= Alex Stuart-Menteth =

Royal Navy officer

- Born: 26 August 1912; Merstham, Surrey
- Died: 14 May 2000 (aged 87); Edinburgh, Lothian
- Spouse: Penelope Giles
- Military career
- Allegiance: United Kingdom
- Branch: Royal Navy
- Service years: 1926–1958
- Rank: Commander
- Commands: HMS Berkeley; HMS Aldenham; HMS Dinosaur; HMS Havelock; HMS St. James; HMS Obdurate
- Conflicts: Second World War
- Awards: Distinguished Service Cross; Mentioned in Despatches

Commander Henry Alexander Stuart-Menteth, DSC (26 August 1912 – 14 May 2000) was a British naval officer famous for his service in the Royal Navy, particularly during the Second World War where he assisted in the sinking of two U-boats and helped capture Enigma code fragments, which enabled Bletchley Park to decipher the code. He commanded six ships during his career. He married in 1952, having two sons and a daughter, and seven grandchildren in turn.

Stuart-Menteth was born as one of four. He joined a navy cadet force in Devon, serving on several ships. After his promotion course, he served both abroad and in the United Kingdom. He joined HMS Hunter shortly before the Second World War. His ship was torpedoed after a raid on a German-held port in April 1940. He was kept in a hospital by the Germans, and was listed at home as killed in action. When the British liberated the area, he was freed. On his next ship, HMS Somali, he helped capture Enigma code fragments, which enabled Bletchley Park to decipher the code. In the same year he was given his first command, HMS Berkeley. He was mentioned in despatches in 1942, while working on HMS Aldenham after the ship sunk a U-boat, and a Distinguished Service Cross for sinking another U-boat. Stuart-Menteth was entrusted to the Royal Australian Navy in 1949, where he commanded two destroyers. He ran the Scottish Corps of Commissionaires for 20 years after his 1958 retirement.

== Early life ==
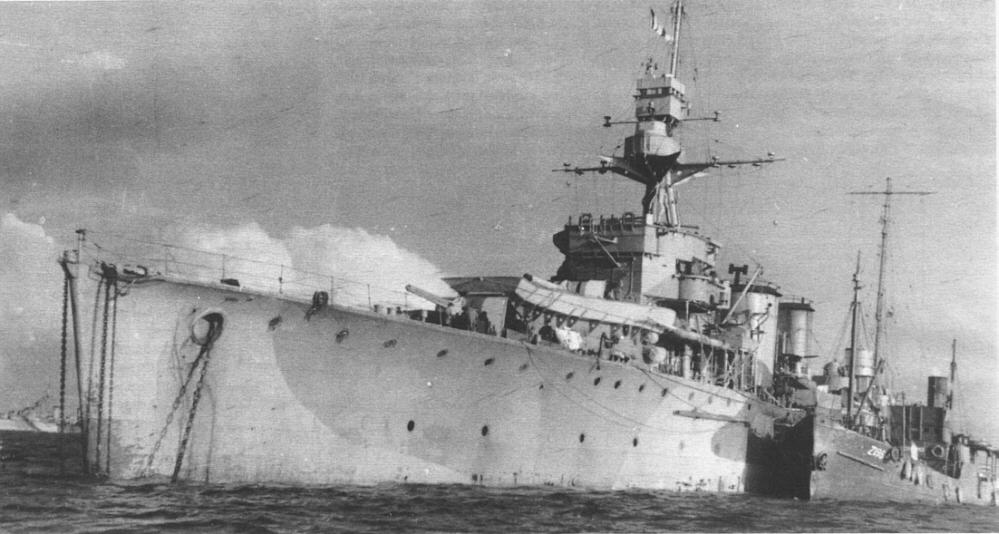
HMS Dragon, where Stuart-Menteth served as a cadet

Henry Alexander Stuart-Menteth, often abbreviated to Alex Stuart-Menteth, was born on 26 August 1912 in Merstham, Surrey. He was the son of Walter Stuart-Menteth and Violet Stuart-Menteth (née Lafone), one of four: Walter Granville Stuart-Menteth (1906 – 1970), Frances Bevyl Stuart-Menteth (1907 – 1957), and Lucy Violet Stuart-Menteth (1911 – ). In 1926, he became a cadet in Dartmouth, Devon. With the cadets, he served on the ships HMS Renown in the Atlantic, HMS Dragon in the West Indies and America, and on the shore establishment HMS President on his promotion course.

== Naval career ==
Alex Stuart-Menteth served on the destroyers HMS Whitehall in the Mediterranean in 1934 and 1935, HMS Windsor in the home fleet in 1935 and 1936, the minesweeper HMS Elgin in the reserve fleet in 1935, and HMS Defender in 1935 serving in China.

=== Second World War ===
On 28 August 1939, shortly before the outbreak of the Second World War, Stuart-Menteth joined the destroyer HMS Hunter. Hunter was in Captain Bernard Warburton-Lee's 2nd Flotilla, along with four other destroyers. On 10 April 1940, in a snowstorm, the Flotilla attacked the port of Narvik, held by the Germans. Four German destroyers were sunk and seven damaged, notably sinking SS Rauenfels, an 8,500-ton ship transporting ammunition. Hunter was set alight and torpedoed, leading to her sinking. As she sank, Stuart-Menteth was trapped by a malfunctioning davit with a leg wound on the upper deck. A rating saved Stuart-Menteth, and they were both picked up by German sailors.

"I vaguely remember being hauled out of the water, but must have passed out, and when I came to, I was lying on the deck in the German destroyer's wardroom. I remember seeing a picture of Hitler on the wall facing me."

— The Telegraph quoting Stuart-Menteth on Hunter's sinking.

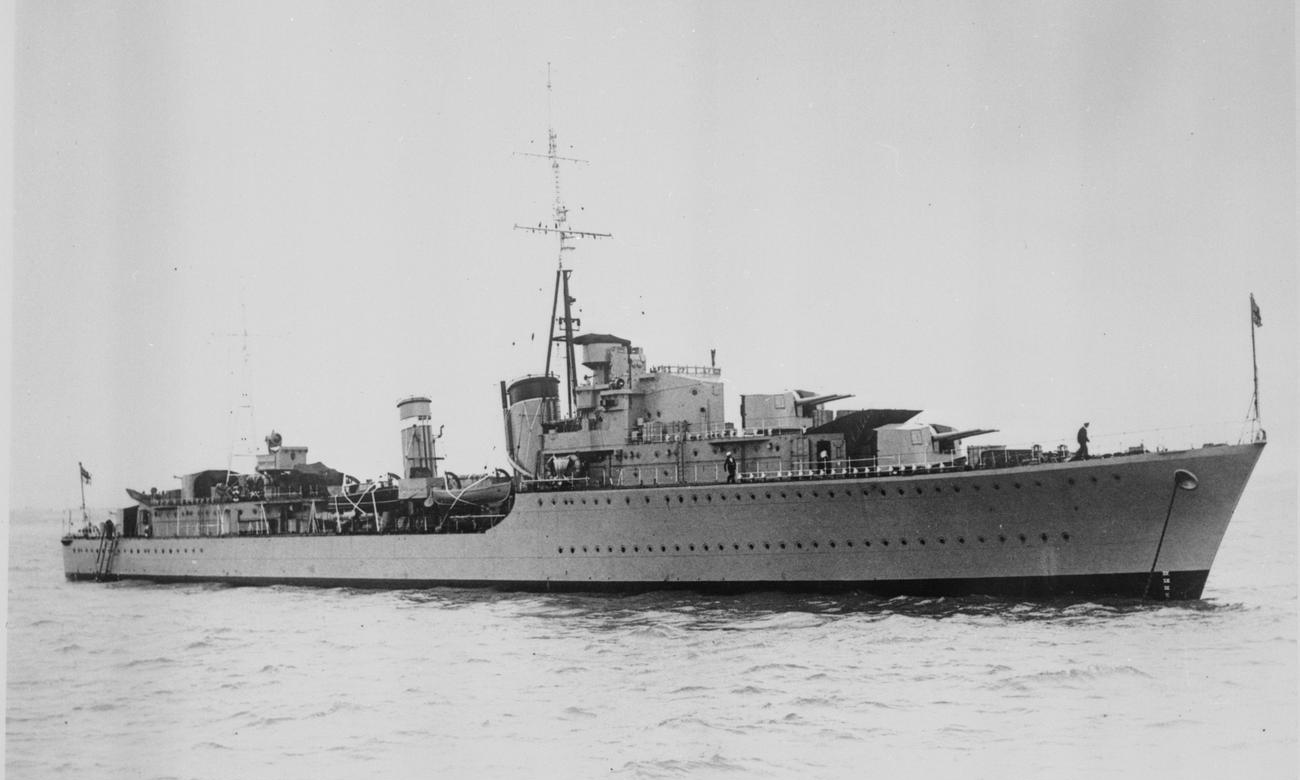
Stuart-Menteth was first lieutenant of HMS Somali

Stuart-Menteth was taken to Narvik, at a civilian hospital. He remained in the town until its eventual liberation by the Allies. However, whilst he was in hospital, Stuart-Menteth was listed as killed in action, and had an obituary in The Times as such, which he later read. After further hospitalisation in Britain from April to December 1940, on 3 December Stuart-Menteth became the first lieutenant of the Tribal-class destroyer HMS Somali. She partook in Operation Claymore, an operation to disrupt supplies, to ferry commandoes to shore, and to capture German code. Somalia brought to a stop Krebs, a German trawler, by firing at her, forcing her to stop. A boarding party found cryptographic keys and rotor machines. This assisted Bletchley Park to decipher several Enigma codes.

In May 1941, Stuart-Menteth again assisted the capture of Enigma material from the German ship München, enabling Bletchley Park to begin to decipher German Enigma codes. Several months later, he was given command of his first ship, HMS Berkeley, a Hunt-class destroyer. Stuart-Menteth joined HMS Aldenham in March 1942, and helped sink the German submarine U-58. He was mentioned in despatches on 2 June 1943 as "Lieutenant-Commander Henry Alexander Stuart-Menteth, Royal Navy"; after commanding Aldenham in a disastrous mission in the Aegean Sea. In late 1943, Stuart-Menteth took command of HMS Dinosaur, and partook in training officers of landing craft. His last command in the war was HMS Havelock, with which he assisted in the sinking of U-242, for which he was awarded a Distinguished Service Cross.

=== After the war ===
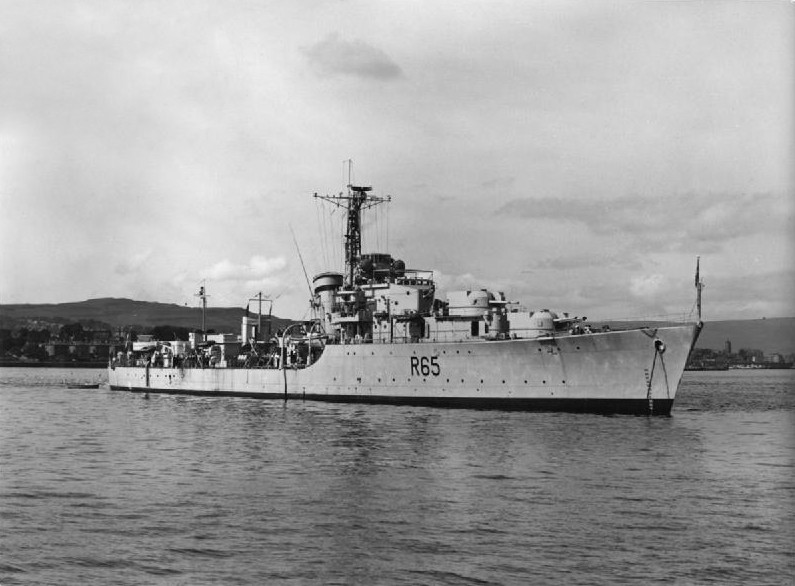
HMS St. James

After World War II on 13 February 1946 Stuart-Menteth became first lieutenant on HMS Birmingham, followed by HMS Superb on 4 September 1946, before being entrusted to the Royal Australian Navy in 1949. There he commanded his last two ships, the destroyers HMS St. James and HMS Obdurate. He went on to work with Lord Mountbatten in Malta, and in 1958 he retired, moving to Scotland. He did, however, operate the Scottish Corps of Commissionaires for close to 20 years, and was chairman of the Edinburgh World Wildlife Fund for 10 years.

== Personal life ==
Stuart-Menteth met Penelope Giles in 1952 in Australia, the couple married, having a daughter and two sons: Andrew Alexander (1954), Walter Henry (1957), and Harriet Lucy (1959); and seven grandchildren. He died on 14 May 2000 in Edinburgh, Lothian.
