= Olive Hirst =

Hirst, Olive Mirzl (1912–1994), advertising agent

- Born: Olive Mirzl Hirst; 20 June 1912; Mortlake, Surrey, England
- Died: 26 February 1994 (aged 81); Westminster, London, England
- Occupation: Advertising agent

Olive Mirzl Hirst (maiden; 20 June 1912 – 26 February 1994) was an English advertising agent. She was the first women to be appointed a managing director of an advertising agency in Britain when she was got to that position with Sells in September 1950. Hirst worked in each of the agency's departments and established its film and screen advertising advertisement. She was the first female to be voted vice-chairman of the Publicity Club of London in the same year, and the first woman to be made a fellow of the Institute of Practitioners in Advertising. Hirst was president of the Women's Advertising Club of London from 1959 to 1960.

== Early life ==
On 20 June 1912, Hirst was born in Mortlake, Surrey, the oldest daughter of Frederick Hirst (1886–1976) and Mirzl Lorraine Schinko (maiden; 1886–1958). Not much is known about her early life. Hirst had two sisters and a brother. She was educated at The Abbey School in Mill Hill.

== Career ==
Hirst left school in 1930 to join the advertising agency department of Sells in its overseas department the following year as secretary to H. G. Wood. She continued working with Wood until 1935, when he became chairman and managing director. Hirst aided Wood in a major way to operate Sells and accounts such as Brylcreem and Timothy Whites. Variously Hirst worked in each of the agency's departments, except for its studio department, and established the film and screen advertising department. Throughout the Second World War, she was given the responsibility of raising money for the Post Office by selling space for advertising in stamp books. It was Hirst's idea to sell advertising space in stamp books.

In January 1950, she was appointed to the board of directors of Sells. Patricia Mann, who wrote Hirst's obituary in The Guardian, said that this "was a signal achievement in what was very much a man's world." Following the death of Wood nine months later in the year, Hirst was unanimously appointed managing director of Sells. This made her the first woman to be made a managing director of an advertising agency in Britain. That same year, Hirst was made the first female to be voted the vice-chairman of the Publicity Club of London (founded 1913) after a four-year spell on the council and as secretary to the finance committee (of which she chaired between 1946 and 1951, when more than 900 people became members). In 1959, she received the Layton Trophy from the Publicity Club. Hirst was the first woman to be made a fellow of the Institute of Practitioners in Advertising in 1961. She was also the first woman to gain election to its council.

From 1959 to 1960, Hirst was president of the Women's Advertising Club of London (WACL). She was one of the primary instigators of the publications of the WACL's project that led to the publication of the 150 Careers in Advertising, with Equal Opportunity for Men and Women (subtitled 'with equal opportunities for men and women') by Patricia Mann in 1971. The book stated career opportunities in advertising for women and men with particular advice for women and it was aimed towards graduates, school leavers and those who entered the advertising industry from another career. Following her retirement, she began her second career. Hirst spent several years working as a supplier of oil drilling equipment for an international oil equipment company. Hirst wrote a regular newsletter to keep in contact with employees.

== Personal life ==
She was a Roman Catholic. On 26 February 1994, Hirst died of lung cancer at the Hospital of St John and St Elizabeth in Westminster, having suffering from the cancer for quite some time. She was not married. A requiem mass was held for Hirst at House Chapel in Westminster's Mount Street on the morning of 7 March 1994.

== Legacy ==
A black and white film negative of Hirst taken by Baron Studios in November 1964 has been held in the collection of the National Portrait Gallery, London since 1999.

== Bibliography ==
=== References ===
- Daily Telegraph, The (1 March 1994). "Hirst". No. 42774. p. 22. Archived from the original on 22 February 2022 – via Newspapers.com.
- Mann, Patricia (5 March 1994). "Secretary to MD: Obituary of Olive Hirst". The Guardian. p. 30 – via Gale A170753217 (OneFile).
- National Portrait Gallery, London. "Olive Mirzi Hirst". Archived from the original on 22 February 2022.
- Oxford Dictionary of National Biography (60 Vols). 23 September 2004. LCCN 2004-5444; ISBN 0-1986-1411-X, 978-0-1986-1411-1 (60 Vol. set); OCLC 54778415 (all editions).
1. Via Internet Archive. Vol. 27: "Hinkeringill–Hooper" (limited preview). 2004. ISBN 0-1986-1377-6, 978-0-1986-1377-0 (Vol. 27).
  1. Baker, Anne Pimlott (2004). "Hirst, Olive Mirzl (1912–1994), Advertising Agent". pp. 317–318 – via Internet Archive (limited preview). ISBN 0-1986-1377-6 (Vol. 27).
2. Via Oxford DNB Online. 2004.. ISBN 0-1986-1412-8, 978-0-1986-1412-8; OCLC 56568095.
  1. Baker, Anne Pimlott (2004). "Hirst, Olive Mirzl (1912–1994), Advertising Agent". doi:10.1093/ref:odnb/55025 (online article) (subscription required).
- Times, The (4 March 1994). "Olive Hirst". No. 64893. p. 21. – via Gale IF0500654804 (OneFile).
