= Sava Banovina =

Province of Yugoslavia (1929–1939)

Sava Banovina Savska banovina Савска бановина
- Banovina of the Kingdom of Yugoslavia
- 1929–1939
- Flag Coat of arms

- Sava Banovina (red) within Kingdom of Yugoslavia (light yellow)
- Capital: Zagreb
- Area
  - 1931: 40,536 km^{2} (15,651 sq mi)
- Population
  - 1931: 2,704,383
- Government
  - Type: Devolved autonomous banate
- Monarch
  - 1929–1934: Alexander I
  - 1934–1939: Peter II
- Ban
  - 1929–1931: Josip Šilović
  - 1938–1939: Stanoje Mihaldžić
- History
  - Established: 3 October 1929
  - 1931 Yugoslav Constitution: 3 September 1931
  - Cvetković–Maček Agreement: 26 August 1939
Preceded by
Maribor Oblast
Osijek Oblast
Primorje-Krajina Oblast
Syrmia Oblast
Zagreb Oblast
Succeeded by
Banovina of Croatia
- Today part of: Croatia; Slovenia

The Sava Banovina or Sava Banate (Serbo-Croatian: Savska Banovina, Савска бановина), was a province (banovina) of the Kingdom of Yugoslavia between 1929 and 1939. It was named after the Sava River and consisted of much of the present-day Croatia (the areas of historical Croatia and Slavonia). Until 1931, it also comprised White Carniola, now part of Slovenia. The capital city of the Sava Banovina was Zagreb.

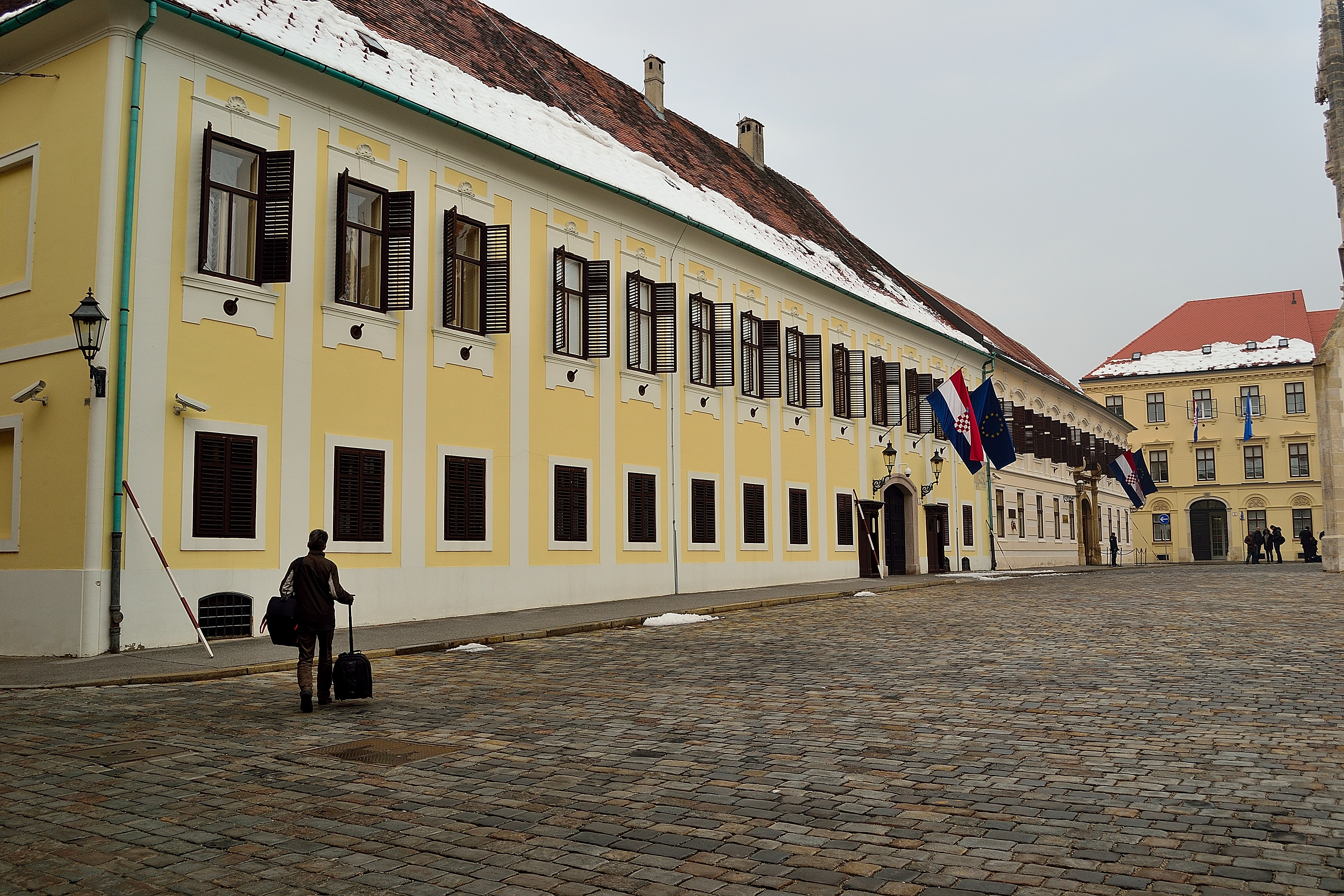
Banski dvori, today housing the Government of Croatia, served as the seat of Banovina

== Borders ==
According to the 1931 Constitution of the Kingdom of Yugoslavia,

The Sava Banovina is bounded on the north, as far as the river Mura, by the ... boundary of the Drava Banovina. Thereafter the boundary of this Banovina follows the river Mura, then the State frontier with Hungary to the point where this leaves the Drava; from this point the boundary of the Banovina follows the course of the Drava, then that of the Danube, as far as the northern boundary of the district of Ilok. From this point the boundary of the Banovina leaves the Danube and goes towards the Sava, following the eastern boundaries of the district, of Vukovar, Vinkovci, and Županja; taking in these districts. It then follows the course of the river Sava to the mouth of the river Una, then the course of the river Una as far as the north-eastern boundary of the district of Dvor (south-west of Kostajnica). From this point to the Adriatic (Morlach Channel) the boundary of the Banovina follows the southern boundaries of the districts of Kostajnica, Petrinja, Glina, and Gvozd, then the south-eastern boundary of the district of Vojnić and the eastern boundaries of the districts of Slunj, Korenica and Donji Lapac. The boundary then passes along the southern boundary of the districts of Gračac and Gospić, which it includes. From the Adriatic coast the boundary follows the gorge of Ljubač and the canal of Nova Povljana, passes between the islands of Maun and Planik, to rejoin, north of the islands of Olib and Silba, the State frontier on the Adriatic.

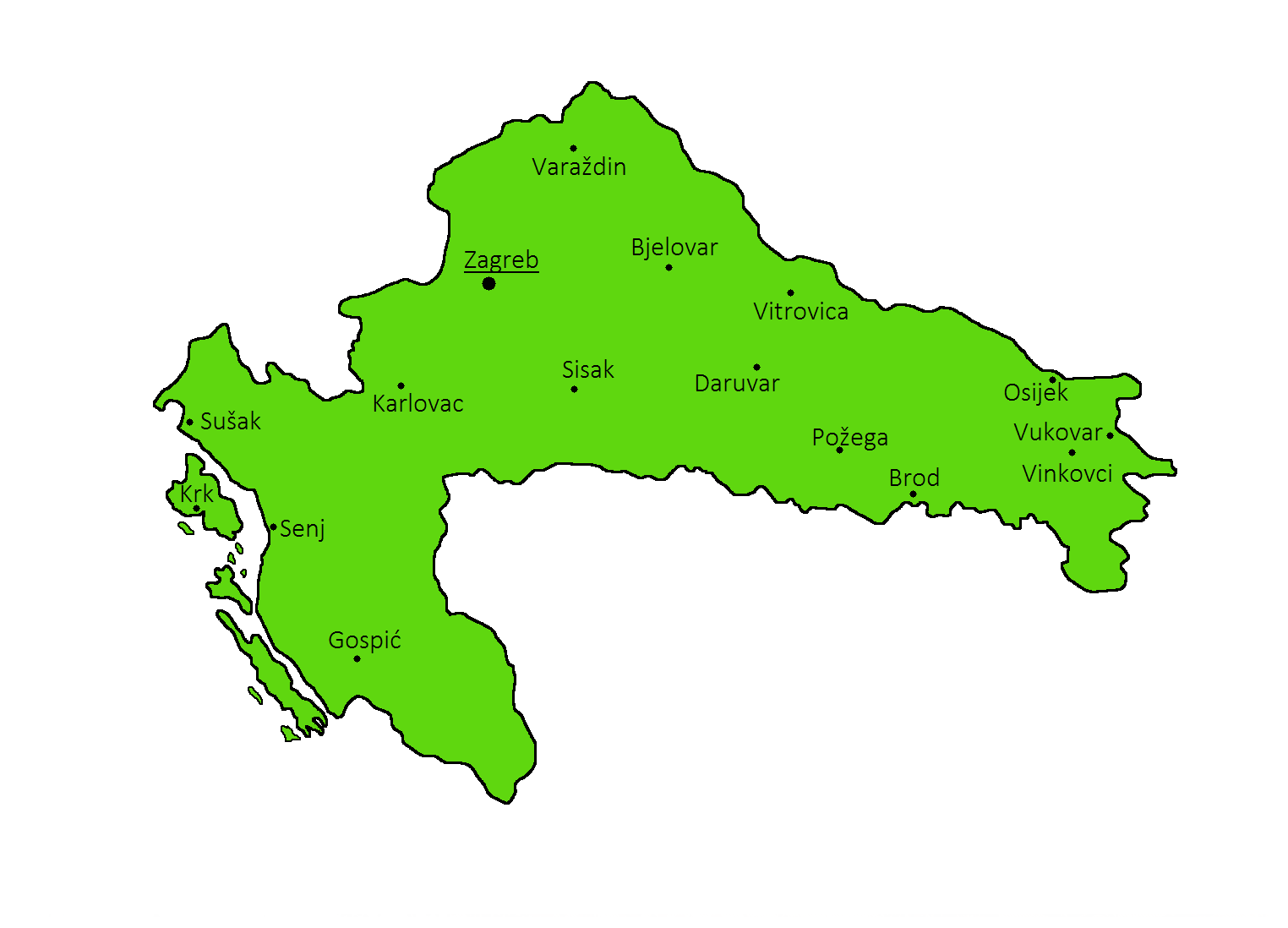
Map of the Sava Banovina

== History ==
In 1939, the Sava Banovina was merged with the Littoral Banovina and parts of neighboring provinces to create the Banovina of Croatia. In 1941, the World War II Axis powers occupied the former area of the Sava Banovina. Small areas were annexed by Fascist Italy and Hungary with the remainder becoming a part of the Independent State of Croatia. Following World War II, the region was made a part of Croatia within a federal Communist Yugoslavia.

== List of Bans ==
The following is the list of people who held the title of Ban (governor) of Sava Banovina:

Portrait	Name (Born-Died)	Term of office		Party
Portrait	Name (Born-Died)	Start	End	Party
	Josip Šilović (1858–1939)	9 October 1929	1931	??
	Ivo Perović (1881–1958)	1931	1935	??
	Marko Kostrenčić (1884–1976)	1935	2 May 1936	??
	Viktor Ružić (1893–1976)	2 May 1936	24 August 1938	??
	Stanoje Mihaldžić (a) (????–????)	24 August 1938	26 August 1939	??

(a) = acting

== See also ==
- Administrative divisions of Yugoslavia
