= Minićevo =

- Village
- Location within Serbia
- Coordinates: 43°41′00″N 22°17′33″E
- Country: Serbia
- District: Zaječar District
- Municipality: Knjaževac

Population (2002)
  - Total: 828
- Time zone: UTC+1 (CET)
  - Summer (DST): UTC+2 (CEST)

Minićevo (till 1945. Andrejevac and before that Yeni Han (The New Country Inn, in Ottoman Turkish), translated to Novi Han after it became a part of the Principality of Serbia and eventually Kraljevo Selo (The King's Village, in Serbian) in 1894-1938, in which capacity it had the status of a small municipal centre) is located in the municipality of Knjaževac, Serbia.

According to the 2002 census, the village has a population of 828 people.
