= Planik =

Island in Croatia

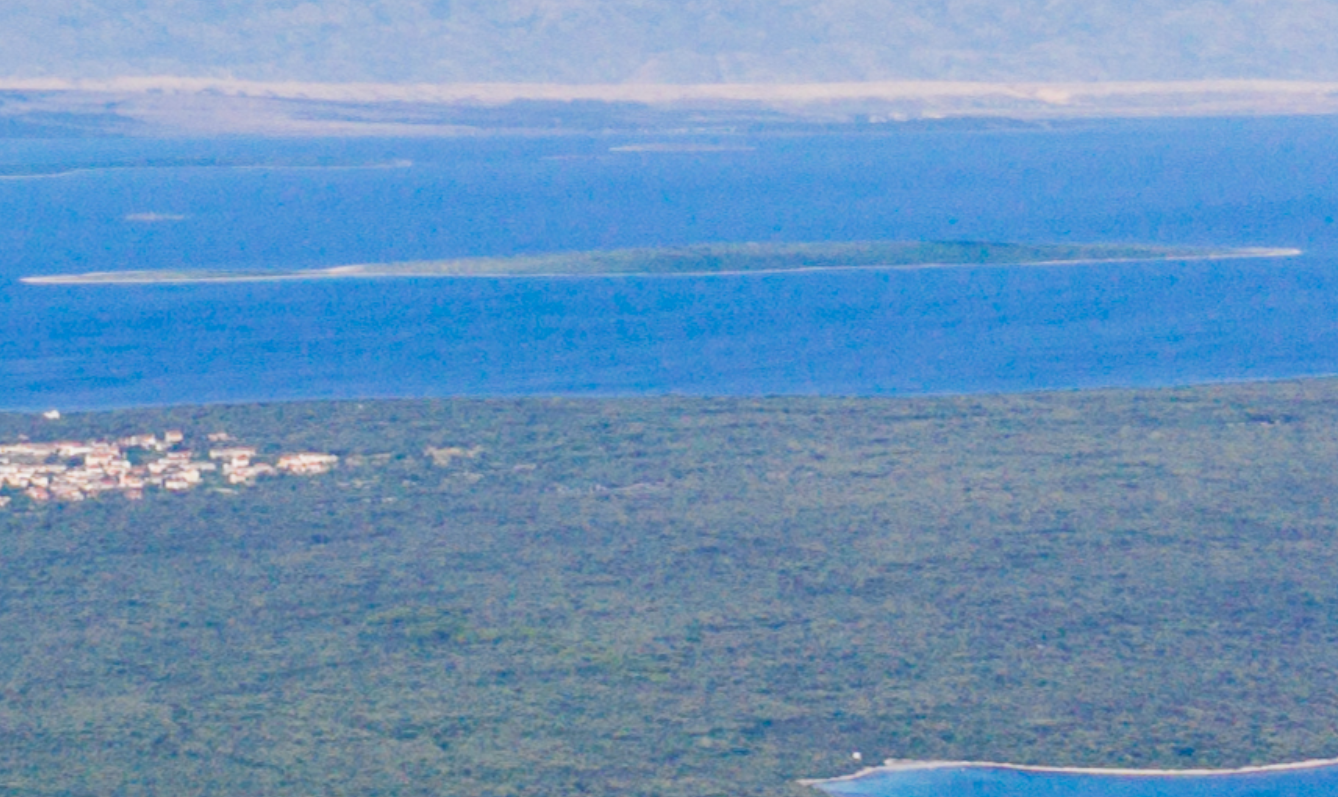

- Location within Croatia
- Interactive map of Planik

Geography
- Location: Adriatic Sea
- Coordinates: 44°22′48″N 14°51′26″E
- Area: 1.09 km^{2} (0.42 sq mi)
- Highest point: 37

Administration
- Croatia
- County: Zadar County

Demographics
- Population: 0

Planik is an uninhabited Croatian island in the Adriatic Sea located east of Olib. Its area is 1.09 km^{2} (0.42 sq mi).

The island is 4 km long, and the widest part is 800 m wide and covered with macchia. The nearby residents from Olib kept sheep all the year.
