= HMS St. James (D65) =

Battle-class destroyer

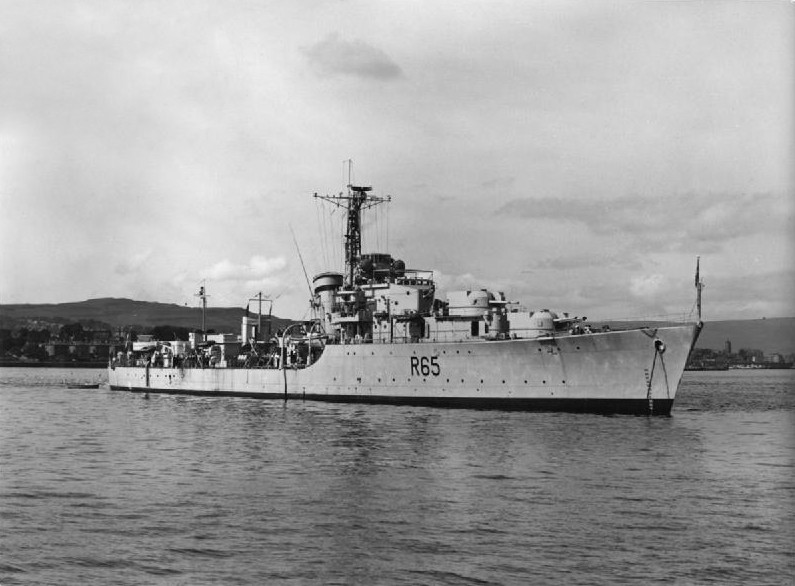

History

United Kingdom
- Name: HMS St. James
- Ordered: 12 August 1942
- Builder: Fairfield Shipbuilding and Engineering Company
- Laid down: 20 May 1943
- Launched: 7 June 1945
- Commissioned: 12 July 1946
- Identification: Pennant number: R65 (later D65)
- Fate: Scrapped in 1961

General characteristics
- Class & type: Battle-class destroyer
- Displacement: 2,315 tons standard; 3,290 tons full load
- Length: 379 ft (116 m)
- Beam: 40 ft (12 m)
- Draught: 15.3 ft (4.7 m)
- Propulsion: 2 steam turbines, 2 shafts, 2 boilers, 50,000 shp (37 MW)
- Speed: 35.75 knots (66.21 km/h)
- Range: 4,400 nautical miles (8,100 km) at 12 knots (22 km/h)
- Complement: 308
- Armament: 2 × dual 4.5-inch (114 mm) gun; 14 × Bofors 40 mm gun; 8 × 21 inch (533 mm) torpedo tubes; 1 × Squid mortar

Service record
- Part of: 5th Destroyer Flotilla

HMS St. James was a Battle-class destroyer of the Royal Navy. She was named in honour of the Battle of St. James Day which took place in 1666.

St. James was built by Fairfields at Govan. She was launched on 7 June 1945 and commissioned on 12 July 1946.

== Operational service ==
In 1946, St. James joined the 5th Destroyer Flotilla, part of the Home Fleet. On 25 August 1946, while undergoing calibration trials off the Isle of Portland, she accidentally hit and sank the tug Buccaneer with a 4.5-inch shell, while aiming at the target Buccaneer was towing. St. James's captain, Commander J. Lee Barber, went alongside and took off Buccaneer's crew without loss, but St. James suffered a damaged propeller when the tug capsized. An inquiry was held aboard the cruiser Superb on 28 August, at which it was decided that no further action would be taken.

In 1950, St. James deployed on a Home Fleet Spring Cruise, which saw her, as well as many other vessels, including the aircraft carrier Victorious and two other carriers, as well as the battleship Vanguard, visit the Mediterranean, which included stops in Italy. The group performed the usual naval exercises in the region, as well as undertaking 'fly-the-flag' visits to a number of ports.

In 1953, St. James was placed in reserve along with a number of her sister ships. However she did take part in the Fleet Review to celebrate the Coronation of Queen Elizabeth II.

In 1957, St. James finally began a refit to modernise the destroyer, but just the following year, her refit was cancelled, and she was subsequently placed on the disposal list. In 1961, at Newport, St. James was broken up.

== Publications ==
- Colledge, J. J.; Warlow, Ben (2006) [1969]. Ships of the Royal Navy: The Complete Record of All Fighting Ships of the Royal Navy from the 15th Century to the Present (3rd Rev ed.). London: Chatham Publishing. ISBN 978-1-86176-281-8. OCLC 67375475.
- Boniface, Patrick (2007). Battle Class Destroyers. Liskeard: Maritime Books. ISBN 978-1-904459-28-6.
- Hodges, Peter (1971). Battle Class Destroyers. London: Almark Publishing. ISBN 0-85524-012-1.
