= Morava Banovina =

Former province in Yugoslavia

Morava Banovina Моравска бановина Moravska banovina
- Banovina of the Kingdom of Yugoslavia
- 1929–1941
- Flag Coat of arms

- Morava Banovina (red) within Kingdom of Yugoslavia (light yellow)
- Capital: Niš
- Area
  - Coordinates: 43.300°N 21.900°E
- Government
  - Type: Devolved autonomous banate
- Monarch
  - 1929–1934: Alexander I
  - 1934–1941: Peter II
- History
  - Established: 3 October 1929
  - 1931 Yugoslav Constitution: 3 September 1931
  - Invasion of Yugoslavia: 6–18 April 1941
Succeeded by
Socialist Republic of Serbia
- Today part of: Kosovo; Serbia

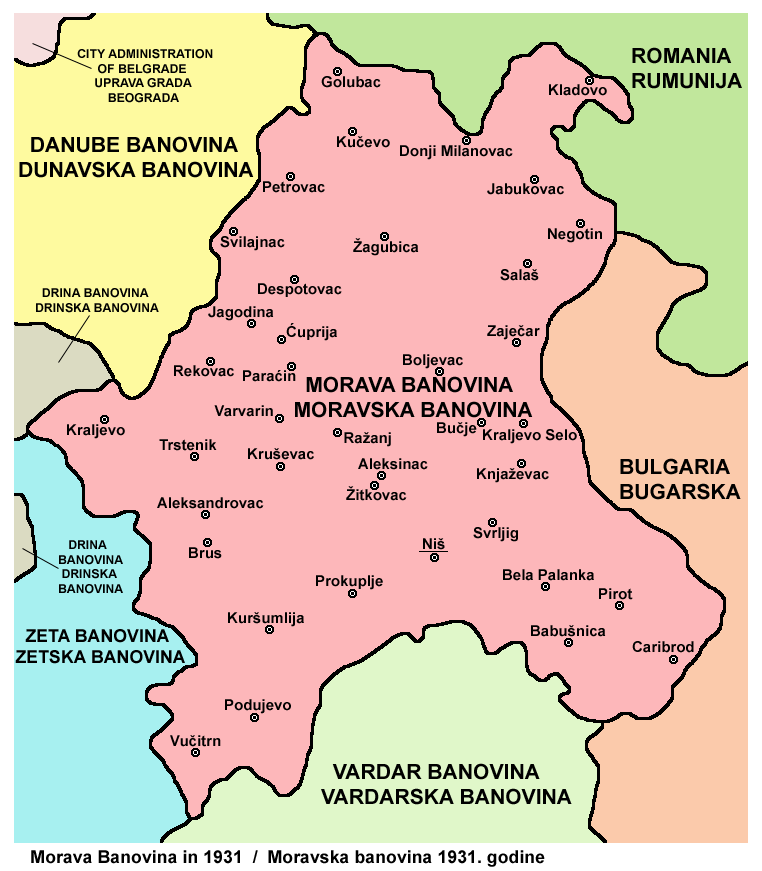
Map of Morava Banovina

The Morava Banovina or Morava Banate (Serbo-Croatian: Моравска бановина / Moravska banovina), was a province (banovina) of the Kingdom of Yugoslavia between 1929 and 1941. This province consisted of parts of present-day Central Serbia (including Vushtrri and Podujevë in Kosovo) and it was named after the Morava Rivers. The capital city of the Morava Banovina was Niš.

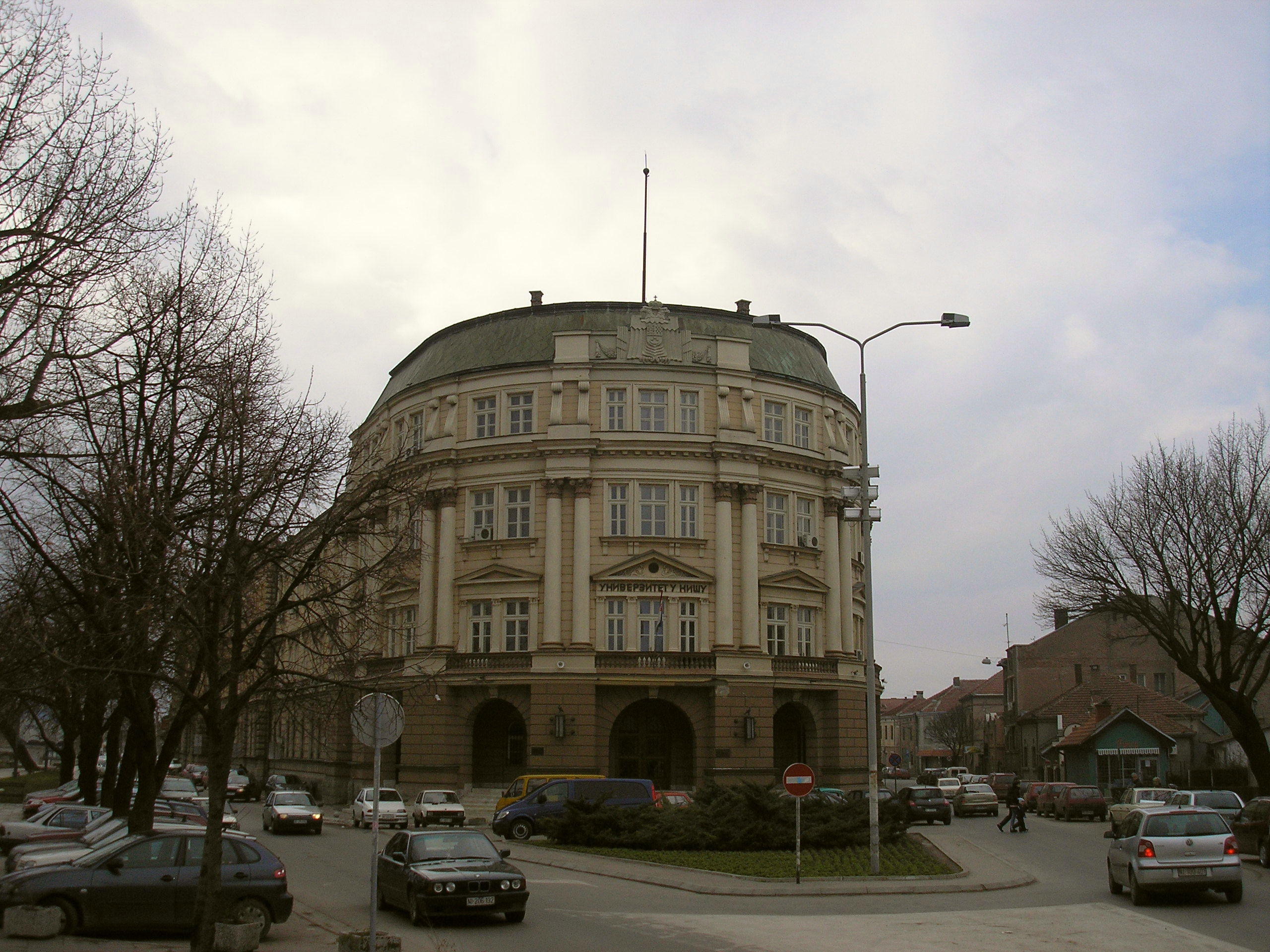
The Old District Offices that served as administrative seat of Banovina. Today serves as University of Niš, front view

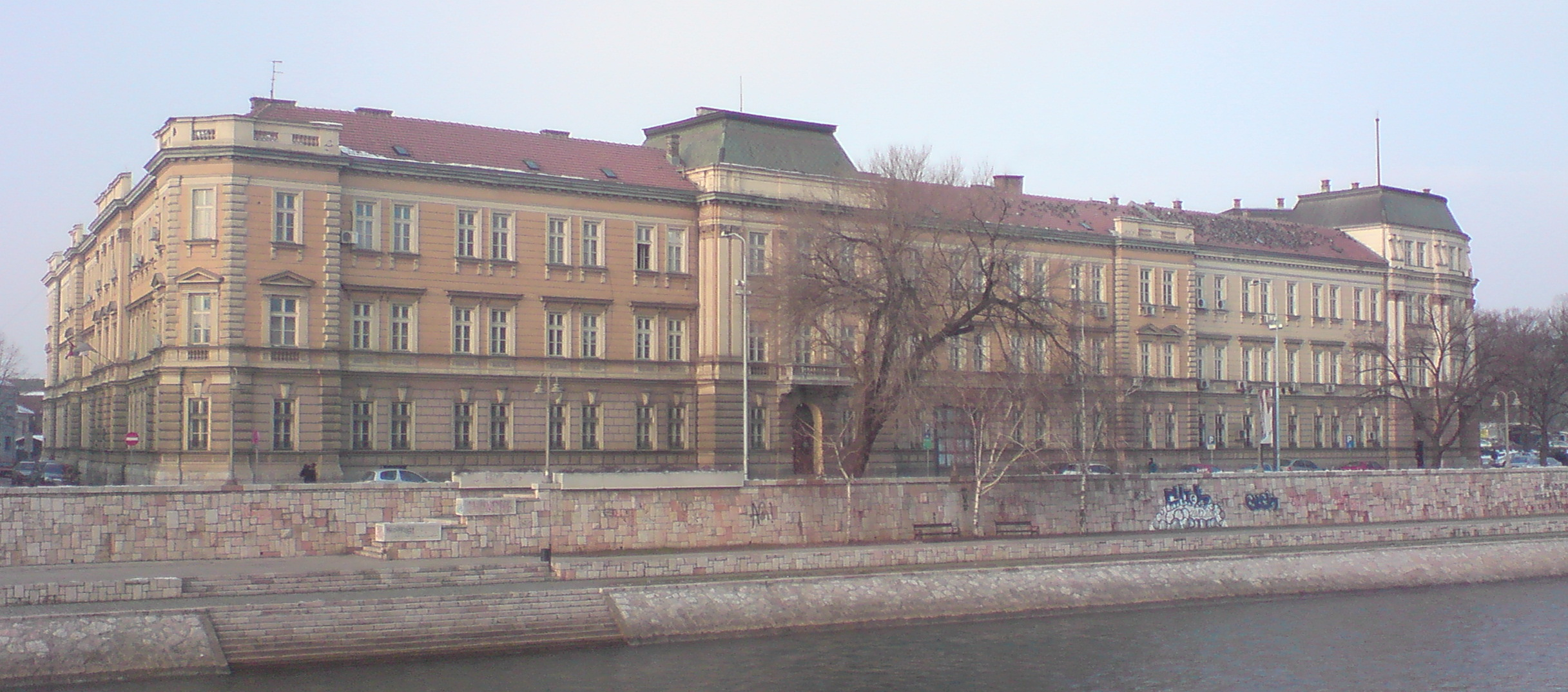
Side view

== Borders ==
According to the 1931 Constitution of the Kingdom of Yugoslavia,

The Morava Banovina is bounded on the north and the east by the State frontiers with Romania and Bulgaria as for as the southern boundary of the district of Lužnica (at Descani Kladenac). From this point the boundary of the Banovina follows the southern boundaries of the districts of Lužnica, Niš, Dobrić, Prokuplje, Kosanica, Lab and Vushtrri, including all these districts, and at the intersection of the boundaries of the three districts of Vushtrri, Gračanica and Drenica it joins the boundary of the Zeta Banovina. The boundary then continues northwards, coinciding with the boundaries of the Zeta, Drina, and Danube Banovinas.

== History ==
In 1941, the World War II Axis powers occupied the Morava Banovina and it was made part of German and Bulgaria -occupied Serbia and Italian-occupied Albania. Following World War II, the region was made a part of Serbia within a federal Socialist Yugoslavia.

== See also ==
- Southern and Eastern Serbia
- Administrative divisions of Yugoslavia
