= Drava Banovina =

Province of the Kingdom of Yugoslavia

Coordinates: 46°2′59.18″N 14°30′23.68″E

Drava Banovina Dravska banovina Дравска бановина
- Banovina of the Kingdom of Yugoslavia
- 1929–1941
- Flag Coat of arms

- Drava Banovina (red) within Kingdom of Yugoslavia (light yellow)
- Capital: Ljubljana
- Area
  - 1931: 15,849 km^{2} (6,119 sq mi)
- Population
  - 1921: 1,060,356
  - 1931: 1,144,298
- Government
  - Type: Devolved autonomous banate
- Monarch
  - 1929–1934: Alexander I
  - 1934–1941: Peter II
- Ban
  - 1929–1930: Dušan Sernec
  - 1935–1941: Marko Natlačen
- Historical era: Interwar period
  - Established: 3 October 1929
  - 1931 Yugoslav Constitution: 3 September 1931
  - Invasion of Yugoslavia: 16 April 1941
Preceded by
Duchy of Carniola
Succeeded by
Nazi Germany
Kingdom of Italy
Kingdom of Hungary
- Today part of: Slovenia, Croatia

The Drava Banovina or Drava Banate (Slovene and Serbo-Croatian: Dravska banovina), was a province (banovina) of the Kingdom of Yugoslavia between 1929 and 1941. This province consisted of most of present-day Slovenia and was named for the Drava River. The capital city of the Drava Banovina was Ljubljana.

== Borders ==
According to the 1931 Constitution of the Kingdom of Yugoslavia,

The Drava Banovina is bounded by a line passing from the point where the northern boundary of the district of Čabar cuts the State frontier, then following the State frontier with Italy, Austria and Hungary to a point where the State frontier with Hungary reaches the river Mura (north-east of Čakovec). From the river Mura, the boundary of the Banovina follows the eastern and then the southern boundaries; of the districts of Lendava, Ljutomer, Ptuj, Šmarje, Brežice, Krško, Novo Mesto, Metlika, Črnomelj, Kočevje and Logatec, including all the districts mentioned.

Also in 1931, the Municipality of Štrigova (now in Croatia) was separated from the Čakovec District and the rest of Međimurje and was included in the Ljutomer District in the Drava Banovina.

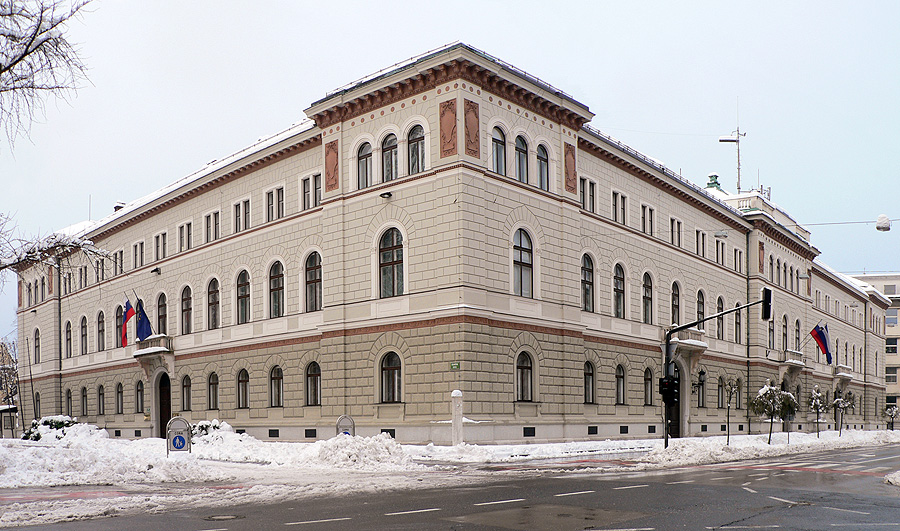
The building that housed the administrative seat of Banovina today serves as the Government Building and President's Office of Slovenia

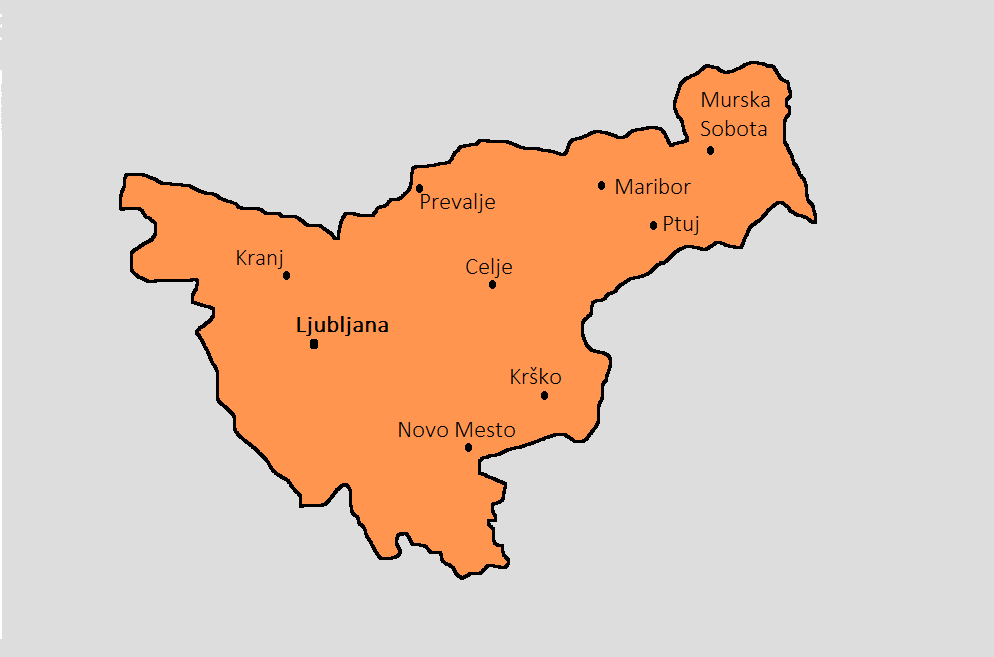
Map of the Drava Banovina

== Administration ==
The Drava Banovina was administratively subdivided into 29 counties (called srez):

- Brežice
- Celje
- Celje (town)
- Črnomelj
- Dolnja Lendava
- Dravograd
- Gornji Grad
- Kamnik
- Kočevje
- Konjice
- Kranj
- Krško
- Laško
- Litija
- Logatec
- Ljubljana
- Ljubljana (town)
- Ljutomer
- Maribor, desni breg
- Maribor, levi breg
- Maribor (town)
- Metlika
- Murska Sobota
- Novo Mesto
- Ptuj
- Ptuj (town)
- Radovljica
- Slovenj Gradec
- Šmarje

== Aftermath ==
In 1941 the World War II Axis powers occupied the Drava Banovina, and it was divided largely between Nazi Germany and Fascist Italy, while Hungary annexed Prekmurje and the Independent State of Croatia annexed some smaller border areas.

Following World War II the region was reconstituted, with additional pre–World War II Italian territory (Julian March), as the Federal State of Slovenia, within a federal second Yugoslavia.

== List of Bans ==
The following is the list of people who held the title of Ban (governor) of Drava Banovina:

Portrait	Name (Born-Died)	Term of office		Party
Portrait	Name (Born-Died)	Start	End	Party
	Dušan Sernec (1882–1952)	9 October 1929	4 December 1930	Slovene People's Party (SLS)
	Drago Marušič (1884–1964)	4 December 1930	8 February 1935	Yugoslav National Party (JNS)
	Dinko Puc (1879–1945)	8 February 1935	10 September 1935	Yugoslav Democratic Party (JDS)
	Marko Natlačen (1886–1942)	10 September 1935	16 April 1941	Slovene People's Party (SLS)

== See also ==
- Administrative divisions of Yugoslavia
