= Demographics of London =

- Population pyramid of London
- Population: ▲8,799,800 (2021)
- Density: ▲5,854/km^{2} (15,160/sq mi) (2020 estimates)
- Growth rate: ▲7.7% (2011 - 2021)
- Life expectancy
  - male: ▼80.3 (2018-2020)
  - female: 84.3 (2018-2020)
- Fertility rate: ▼1.52 (2021)
- Infant mortality: ▼3.4 live deaths/1,000 live births (2018-2020)

Nationality
- Nationality: British
- Major ethnic: ▼ White: 53.8% (2021) ▼ White British: 36.8% (2021)
- Minor ethnic: ▲ Asian British: 20.8% (2021) ▲ Black British: 13.5% (2021) ▲ Mixed: 5.7% (2021) ▲ Other: 6.3% (2021)

Language
- Spoken: British English (main language: 78.4%)

The demography of London is analysed by the Office for National Statistics and data is produced for each of the Greater London wards, the City of London and the 32 London boroughs, the Inner London and Outer London statistical sub-regions, each of the Parliamentary constituencies in London, and for all of Greater London as a whole. Additionally, data is produced for the Greater London Urban Area. Statistical information is produced about the size and geographical breakdown of the population, the number of people entering and leaving country and the number of people in each demographic subgroup. The 2021 population of London was 8,799,800.

== History ==
=== Post-war decline ===
Greater London's population declined after World War II. It declined by 204,364 between 1951 and 1961, and by a further 540,097 between 1961 and 1971.

=== Creation of Greater London ===
The Greater London region was established in 1965 under the London Government Act 1963.

=== Migration boom: 1991 to today ===
From the 1990s, there has been a drastic change in the composition of London's population, which has offset the previous decline of the population. occurring. In 1991, 21.7% of the city was foreign-born, but by 2011 this had risen to 36.7%.

There was a historic tipping point when the 2011 census results showed that the White British population was no longer a majority of London's population, although it remained by far the largest single ethnic group.

== Population ==
Population growth percentage in London between 2011 and 2021

Historical population
Year	Pop.	±%
1801	1,011,157	—
1811	1,197,673	+18.4%
1821	1,450,122	+21.1%
1831	1,729,949	+19.3%
1841	1,917,013	+10.8%
1851	2,286,609	+19.3%
1861	3,094,391	+35.3%
1871	3,902,178	+26.1%
1881	4,709,960	+20.7%
1891	5,565,856	+18.2%
1901	6,226,494	+11.9%
1911	7,157,875	+15.0%
1921	7,553,526	+5.5%
1931	8,098,942	+7.2%
1941	7,987,936	−1.4%
1951	8,164,416	+2.2%
1961	7,781,342	−4.7%
1971	7,449,184	−4.3%
1981	6,608,513	−11.3%
1991	6,887,280	+4.2%
2001	7,172,036	+4.1%
2011	8,173,941	+14.0%
2021	8,799,800	+7.7%

The historical population for the current area of Greater London, divided into the statistical areas of Inner and Outer London is as follows:

London population over time
Year	Inner London	Outer London	Greater London
1801	879,491	131,666	1,011,157
1811	1,040,033	157,640	1,197,673
1821	1,263,975	186,147	1,450,122
1831	1,515,557	214,392	1,729,949
1841	1,661,346	255,667	1,917,013
1851	1,995,846	290,763	2,286,609
1861	2,634,143	460,248	3,094,391
1871	3,272,441	629,737	3,902,178
1881	3,910,735	799,225	4,709,960
1891	4,422,340	1,143,516	5,565,856
1901	4,670,177	1,556,317	6,226,494
1911	4,997,741	2,160,134	7,157,875
1921	4,936,803	2,616,723	7,553,526
1931	4,887,932	3,211,010	8,098,942
1941	4,224,135	3,763,801	7,987,936
1951	3,680,821	4,483,595	8,164,416
1961	3,336,557	4,444,785	7,781,342
1971	3,030,490	4,418,694	7,449,184
1981	2,425,534	4,182,979	6,608,513
1991	2,625,245	4,262,035	6,887,280
2001	2,765,975	4,406,061	7,172,036
2011	3,231,900	4,942,100	8,173,900
2021	3,404,300	5,395,500	8,799,800

=== Age ===
London population pyramid from 1991 to 2021

Population pyramid of each borough in London

Barking and Dagenham

Barnet

Bexley

Brent

Bromley

Camden

City of London

Croydon

Ealing

Enfield

Hackney

Greenwich

Harrow

Hammersmith and Fulham

Haringey

Hillingdon

Havering

Hounslow

Islington

Kensington and Chelsea

Kingston upon Thames

Lambeth

Lewisham

Merton

Newham

Redbridge

Richmond upon Thames

Southwark

Sutton

Waltham Forest

Tower Hamlets

Wandsworth

Westminster
Percentage of the population in age groups

Under 15s in London

15 to 64 year olds

Over 64 years old

=== Fertility ===
The fertility rate of each London borough, 2021

The teenage conception rate in London, 1998 to 2017

In 2023, there were 104,252 live births in London. The fertility rate of London in 2023 was 1.35, which is well below replacement.

Total fertility rate by borough (2023)
London borough	TFR
Barking and Dagenham	2.00
Redbridge	1.77
Hillingdon	1.72
Havering	1.65
Croydon	1.63
Waltham Forest	1.63
Enfield	1.61
Harrow	1.61
Newham	1.60
Hounslow	1.58
Barnet	1.57
Brent	1.53
Bexley	1.51
Bromley	1.50
Sutton	1.49
Ealing	1.48
Merton	1.39
Greenwich	1.38
Haringey	1.33
Richmond upon Thames	1.30
Hackney	1.31
Lewisham	1.26
Kingston upon Thames	1.24
Wandsworth	1.14
Tower Hamlets	1.11
Kensington and Chelsea	1.10
Lambeth	1.09
Hammersmith and Fulham	1.06
Southwark	1.06
Islington	1.01
City of Westminster	1.00
Camden	1.00

=== Population density ===
A map of Greater London's 2011 population density

The population density of London was 5,727 per km^{2} in 2011.

=== Urban and metropolitan area ===
At the 2001 census, the population of the Greater London Urban Area was 8,278,251. This area does not include some outliers within Greater London, but extends into the adjacent South East England and East of England regions. In 2004, the London Plan of the Mayor of London defined a metropolitan region with a population of 18 million.

Eurostat has developed a harmonising standard for comparing metropolitan areas in the European Union. The population of the London Larger Urban Zone is 11,917,000. It occupies an area of 8,920 square kilometres (3,440 mi^{2}). Another definition gives the 2007 population of the metropolitan area as 13,709,000.

== Ethnicity ==
For the overwhelming majority of London's history, the population of the city was ethnically homogenous with the population being of White British ethnic origin, with small clusters of minority groups such as Jewish people, most notably in areas of the East End. From 1948 onwards and especially since the 1990s, the population has diversified in international terms at an increased rate.

In 2011, it was reported for the first time that White British people had become a minority within London, establishing that London was a majority-minority city within the UK. In 2005, a survey of London's ethnic and religious diversity claimed that there were more than 300 languages spoken, and 50 non-indigenous communities with a population of more than 10,000 in London.

=== Ethnicity overall ===
London's ethnic demographics, 1961 to 2021

The ethnic makeup of London in single year age groups in 2021

The ethnic makeup of London over time by age cohorts

The following table shows the ethnic group of respondents from estimates in 1971 and in the 1991–2021 censuses in Greater London.

Ethnic make-up of Greater London
Ethnic Group	Year															
Ethnic Group	1961 estimations		1966 estimations (Note: Percentages for Asian, West Indian (Caribbean)as per Ethnic Minorities in Britain, and African are Commonwealth only. White Total is Total less Asian, West Indian, and African Commonwealth percentages. White British and White Irish numbers and percentages as per Sample Census 1966. White Other number and percentage is Cyprus, Malta, New Zealand, and Australia only, as per Sample Census 1966.)		1971 estimations		1981 estimations		1991 census		2001 census		2011 census		2021 census	
Ethnic Group	Number	%	Number	%	Number	%	Number	%	Number	%	Number	%	Number	%	Number	%
White: Total	7,602,233	97.7%	–	95.93%	6,901,596	92.6%	5,893,973	86.6%	5,333,580	79.80%	5,103,203	71.15%	4,887,435	59.79%	4,731,172	53.8%
White: British (Note: New category created for the 2001 census)	–	–	6,636,770	86.52%	6,500,000	87%	–	–	–	–	4,287,861	59.79%	3,669,284	44.89%	3,239,281	36.8%
White: Irish	–	–	287,610	3.75%	401,596	5.4%	–	–	256,470	3.83%	220,488	3.07%	175,974	2.15%	156,333	1.8%
White: Gypsy or Irish Traveller (Note: New category created for the 2011 census)	–	–	–	–	401,596	5.4%	–	–	–	–	–	–	8,196	0.10%	7,031	0.1%
White: Gypsy	–	–	–	–	401,596	5.4%	–	–	–	–	–	–	–	–	37,689	0.4%
White: Other	–	–	90,080	1.17%	401,596	5.4%	–	–	–	–	594,854	8.29%	1,033,981	12.65%	1,290,838	14.7%
Asian or Asian British: Total	–	–	–	1.53%	–	–	425,426	6.3%	690,031	10.33%	946,894	13.20%	1,511,546	18.49%	1,817,640	20.8%
Asian or Asian British: Indian	–	–	–	–	–	–	232,881	3.4%	347,091	5.19%	436,993	6.09%	542,857	6.64%	656,272	7.5%
Asian or Asian British: Pakistani	–	–	–	–	–	–	59,440	0.9%	87,816	1.31%	142,749	1.99%	223,797	2.74%	290,549	3.3%
Asian or Asian British: Bangladeshi	–	–	–	–	–	–	41,792	0.6%	85,738	1.28%	153,893	2.15%	222,127	2.72%	322,054	3.7%
Asian or Asian British: Chinese (Note: In 2001, listed under the "Other ethnic group" heading.)	–	–	–	–	–	–	35,938	0.5%	56,579	0.84%	80,201	1.12%	124,250	1.52%	147,520	1.7%
Asian or Asian British: Other Asian	–	–	–	–	–	–	55,375	0.8%	112,807	1.68%	133,058	1.86%	398,515	4.88%	401,245	4.6%
Black or Black British: Total	–	–	–	2.54%	–	–	405,394	6%	535,216	8.01%	782,849	10.92%	1,088,640	13.32%	1,188,370	13.5%
Black or Black British: African	–	–	–	0.56%	–	–	102,230	1.5%	163,635	2.44%	378,933	5.28%	573,931	7.02%	697,054	7.9%
Black or Black British: Caribbean	–	–	–	1.98%	–	–	239,956	3.5%	290,968	4.35%	343,567	4.79%	344,597	4.22%	345,405	3.9%
Black or Black British: Other Black	–	–	–	–	–	–	63,208	0.9%	80,613	1.20%	60,349	0.84%	170,112	2.08%	145,911	1.7%
Mixed or British Mixed: Total	–	–	–	–	–	–	–	–	–	–	226,111	3.15%	405,279	4.96%	505,775	5.7%
Mixed: White and Black Caribbean	–	–	–	–	–	–	–	–	–	–	70,928	0.99%	119,425	1.46%	132,555	1.5%
Mixed: White and Black African	–	–	–	–	–	–	–	–	–	–	34,182	0.48%	65,479	0.80%	77,341	0.9%
Mixed: White and Asian	–	–	–	–	–	–	–	–	–	–	59,944	0.84%	101,500	1.24%	125,188	1.4%
Mixed: Other Mixed	–	–	–	–	–	–	–	–	–	–	61,057	0.85%	118,875	1.45%	170,691	1.9%
Other: Total	–	–	–	–	–	–	80,793	1.2%	120,872	1.81%	113,034	1.58%	281,041	3.44%	556,768	6.3%
Other: Arab	–	–	–	–	–	–	–	–	–	–	–	–	106,020	1.30%	139,791	1.6%
Other: Any other ethnic group	–	–	–	–	–	–	–	–	–	–	113,034	1.58%	175,021	2.14%	416,977	4.7%
Non-White: Total	179,109	2.3%	–	4.07%	547,588	7.4%	911,626	13.4%	1,346,119	20.2%	2,068,888	28.85%	3,286,506	40.2%	4,068,553	46.2%
Total	7,781,342	100%	7,671,220	100%	7,449,184	100%	6,805,599	100%	6,679,699	100.00%	7,172,091	100.00%	8,173,941	100.00%	8,799,725	100%

Distribution of ethnic groups in Greater London in the 2021 census
White (2001-2021)

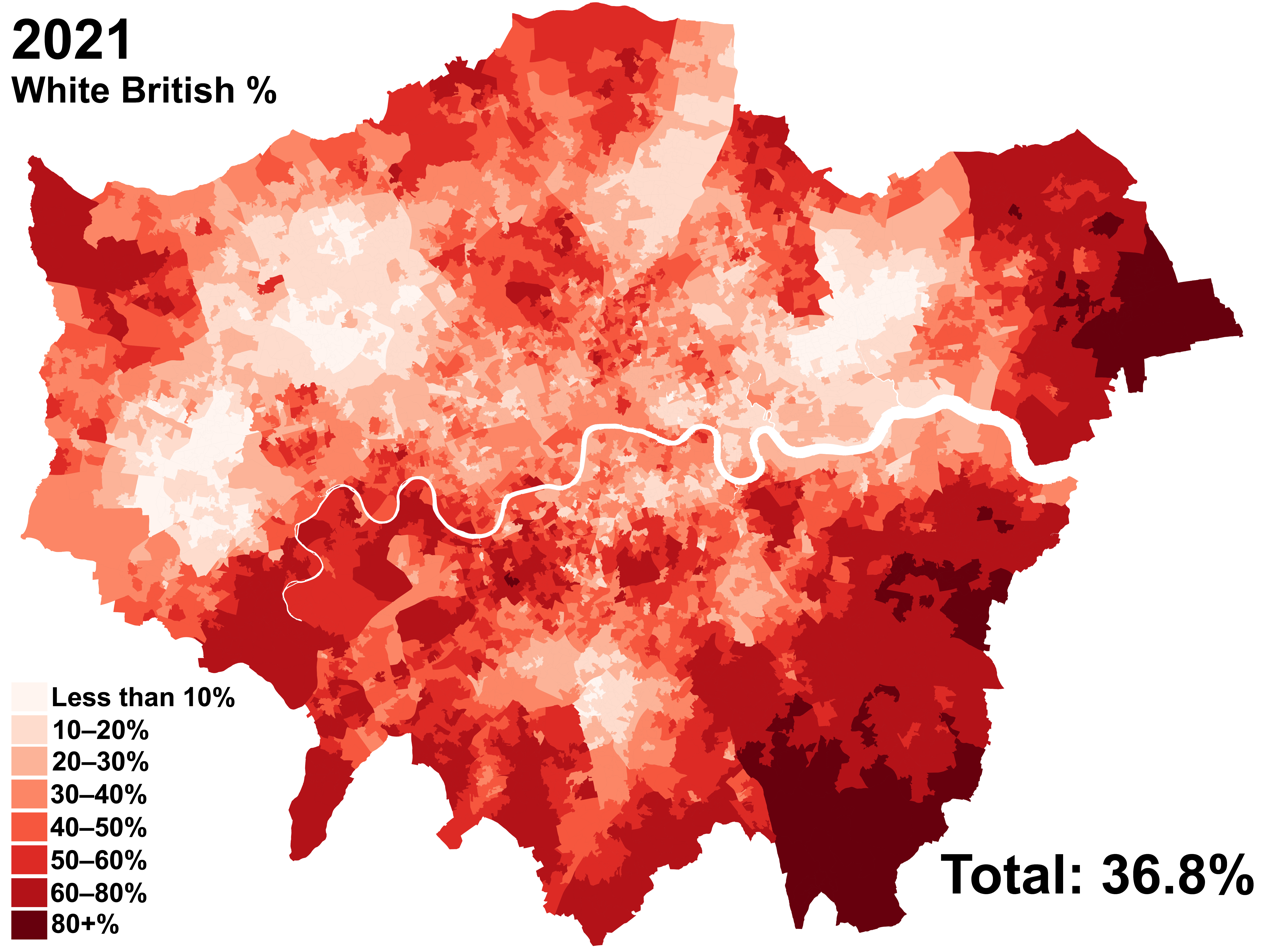
White-British (2021)

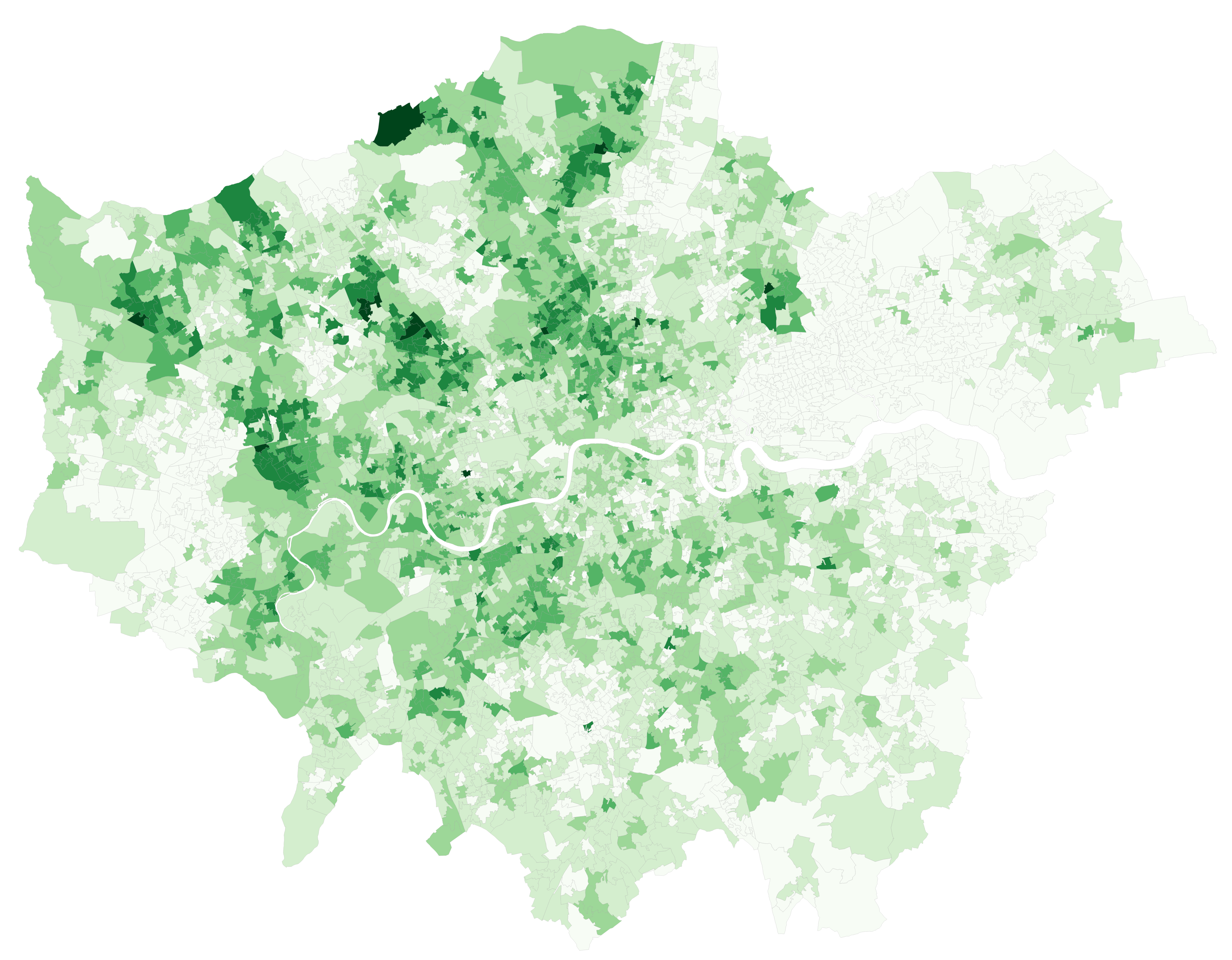
White-Irish (2021)

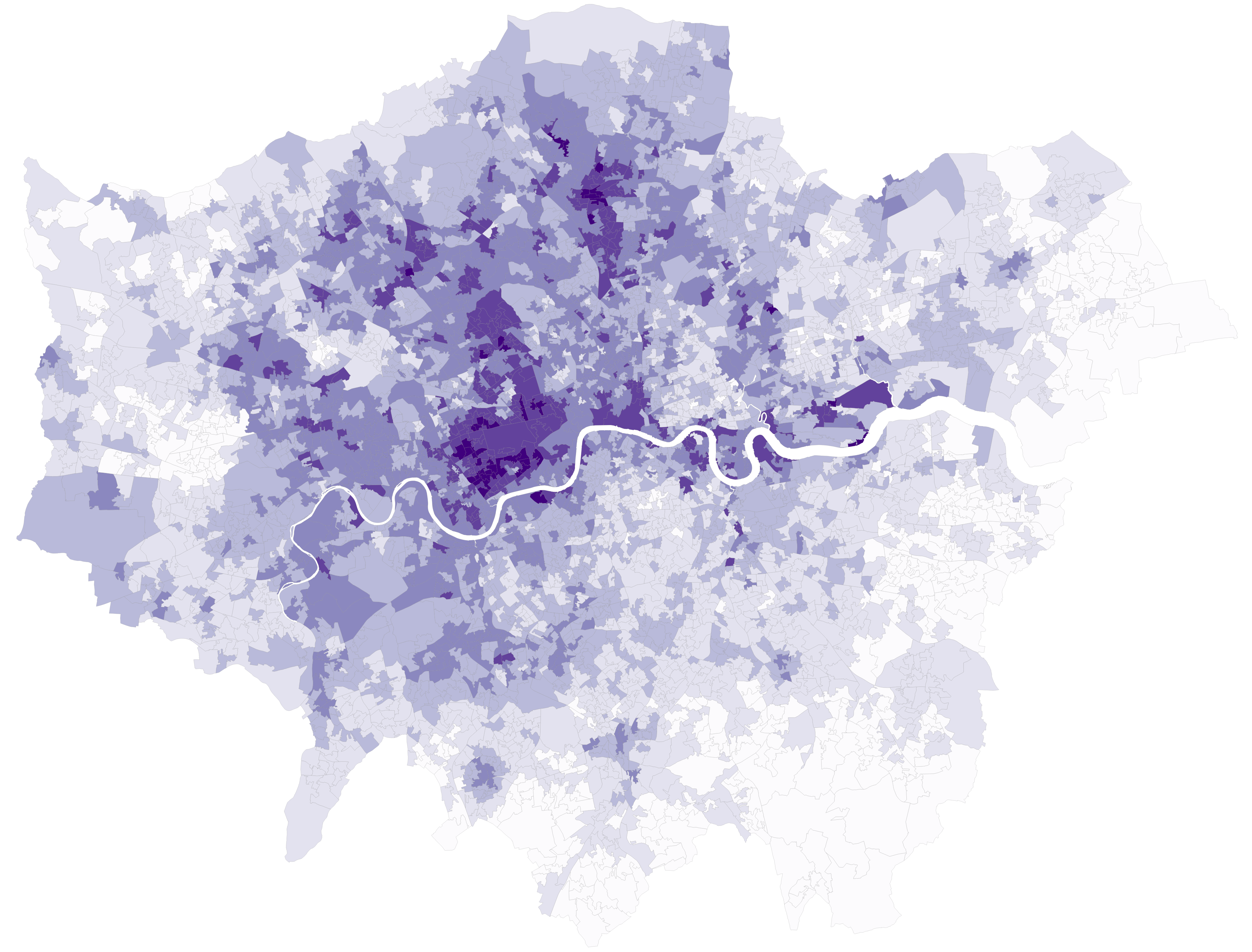
White-Other White (2021)

Asian (2001-2021)

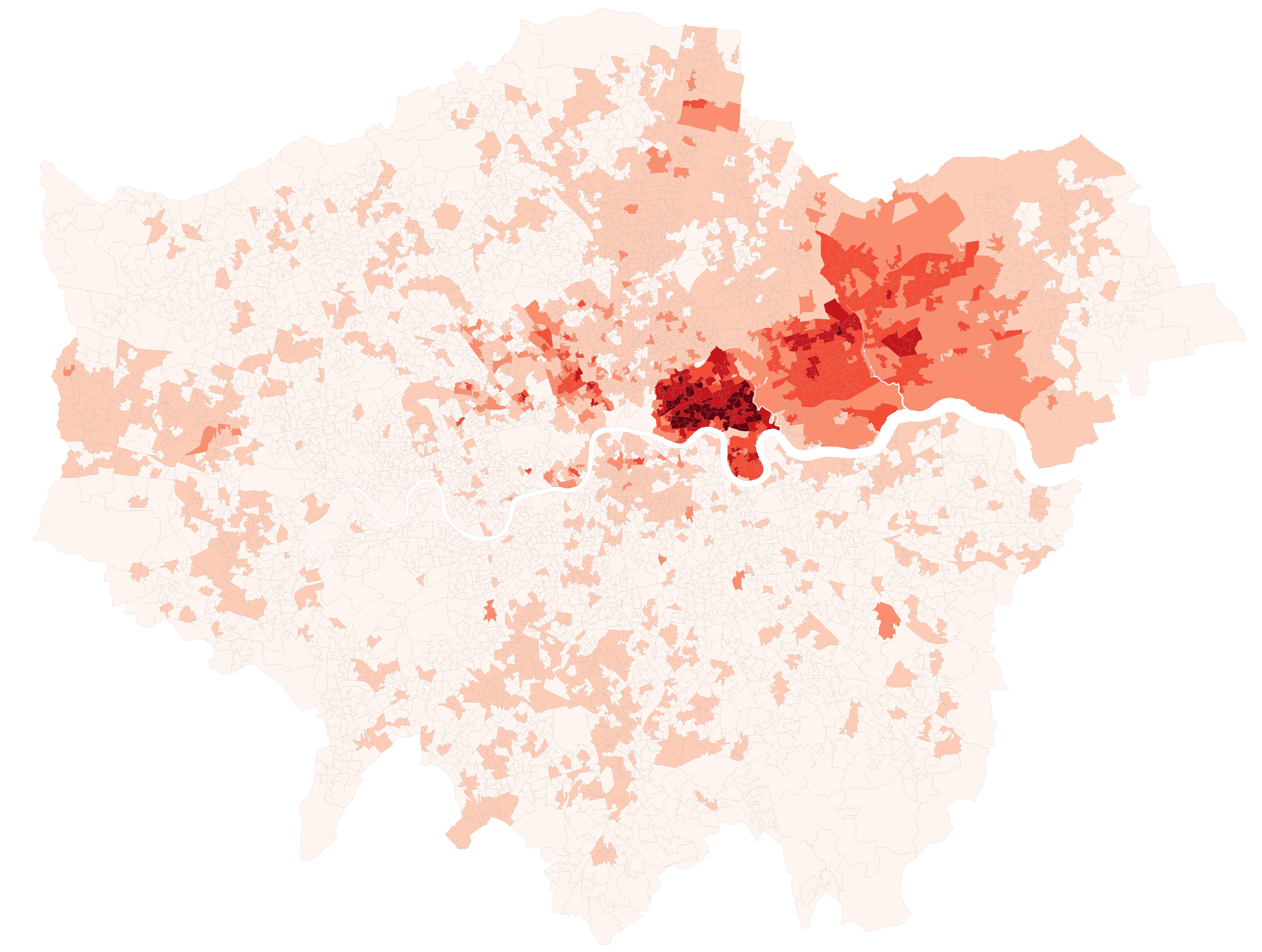
Asian-Bangladeshi (2021)

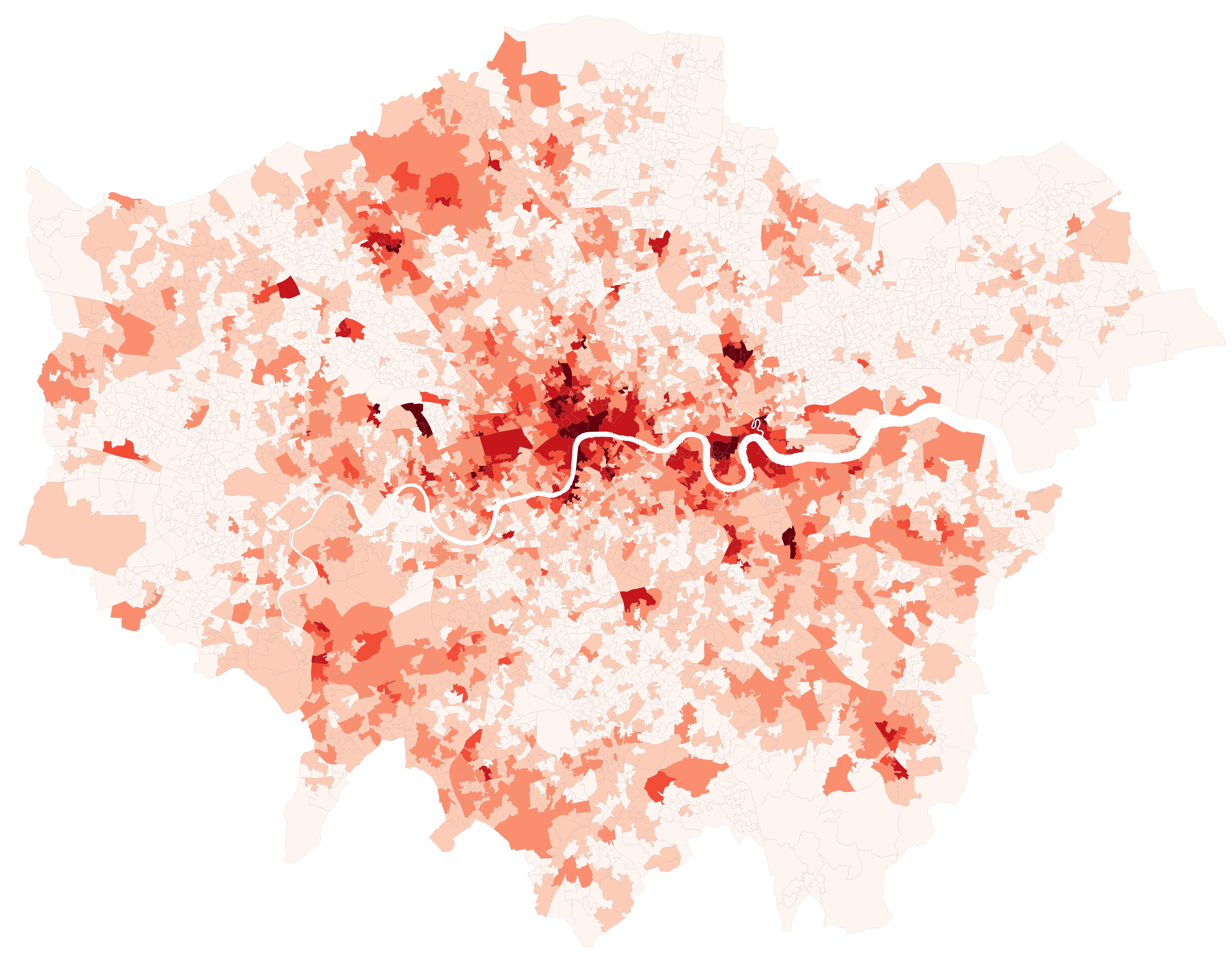
Asian-Chinese (2021)

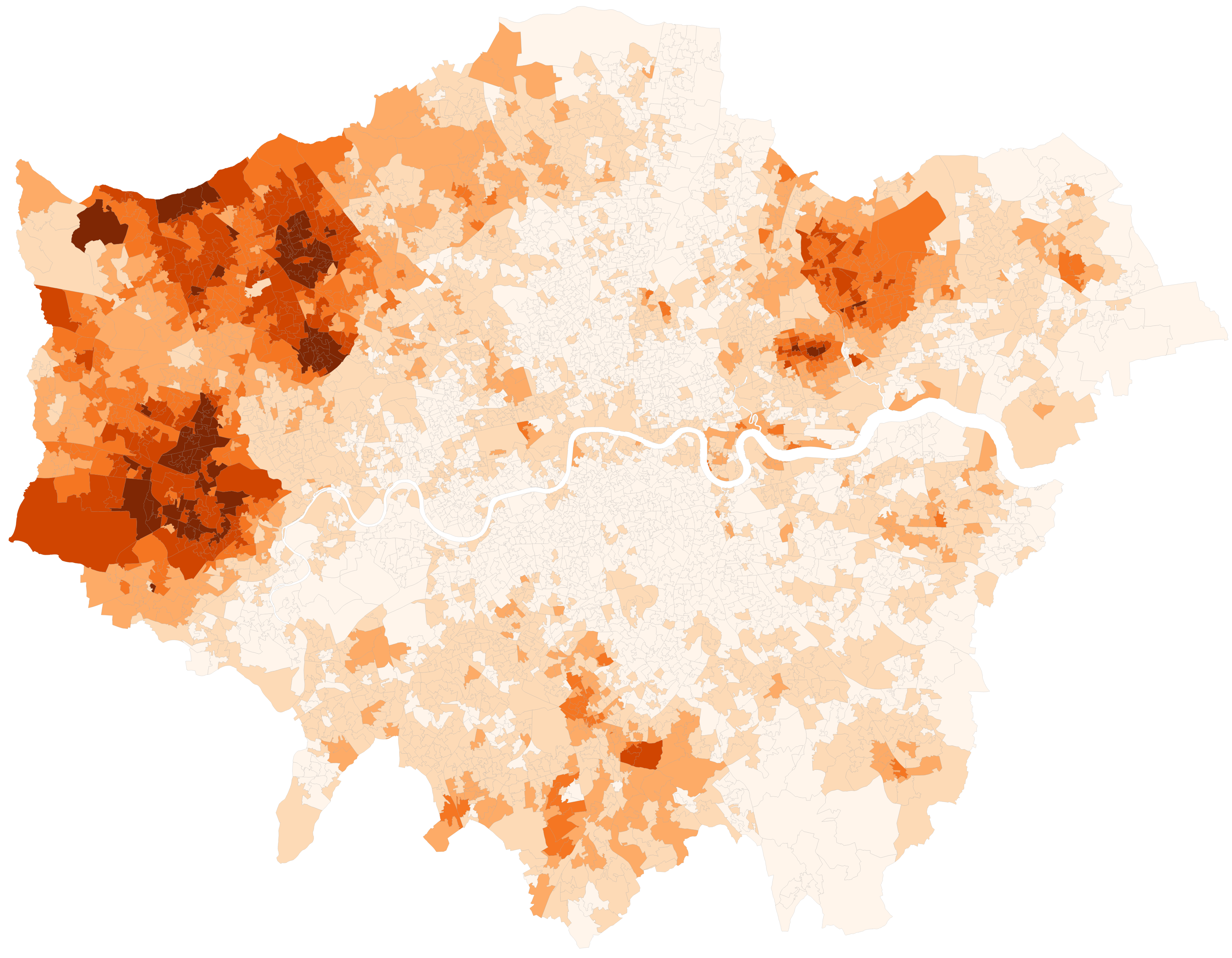
Asian-Indian (2021)

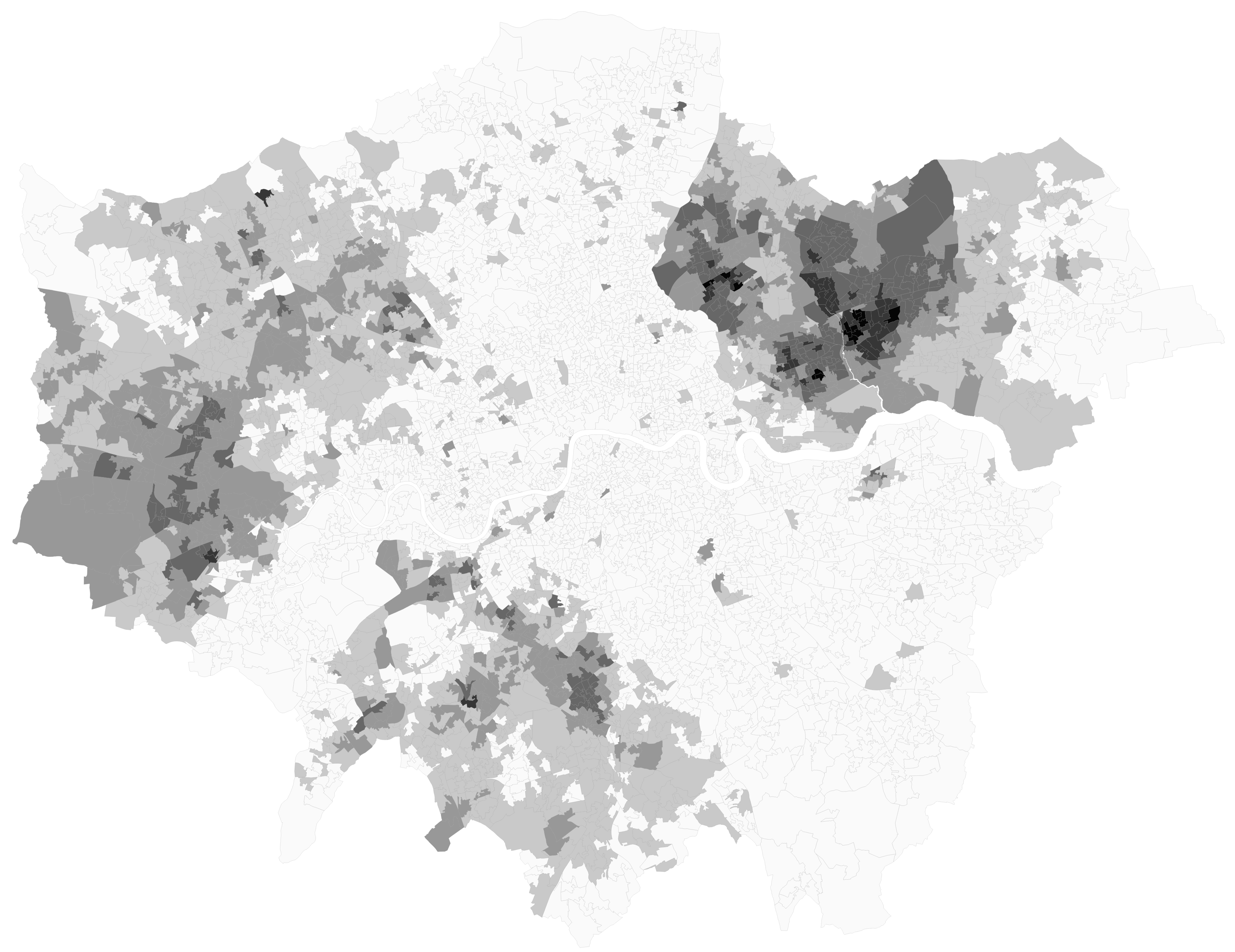
Asian-Pakistani (2021)

Black (2001-2021)

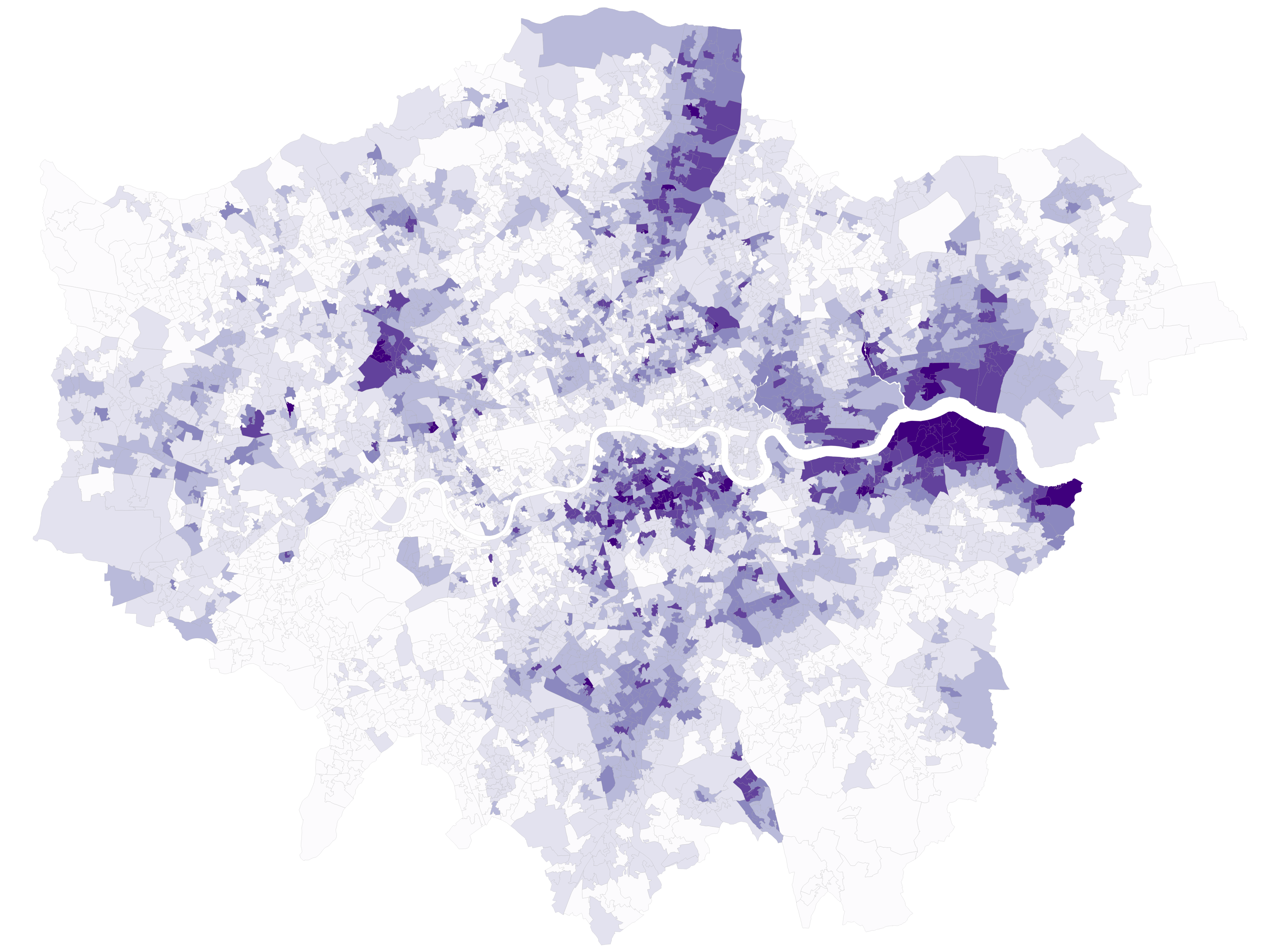
Black-African (2021)

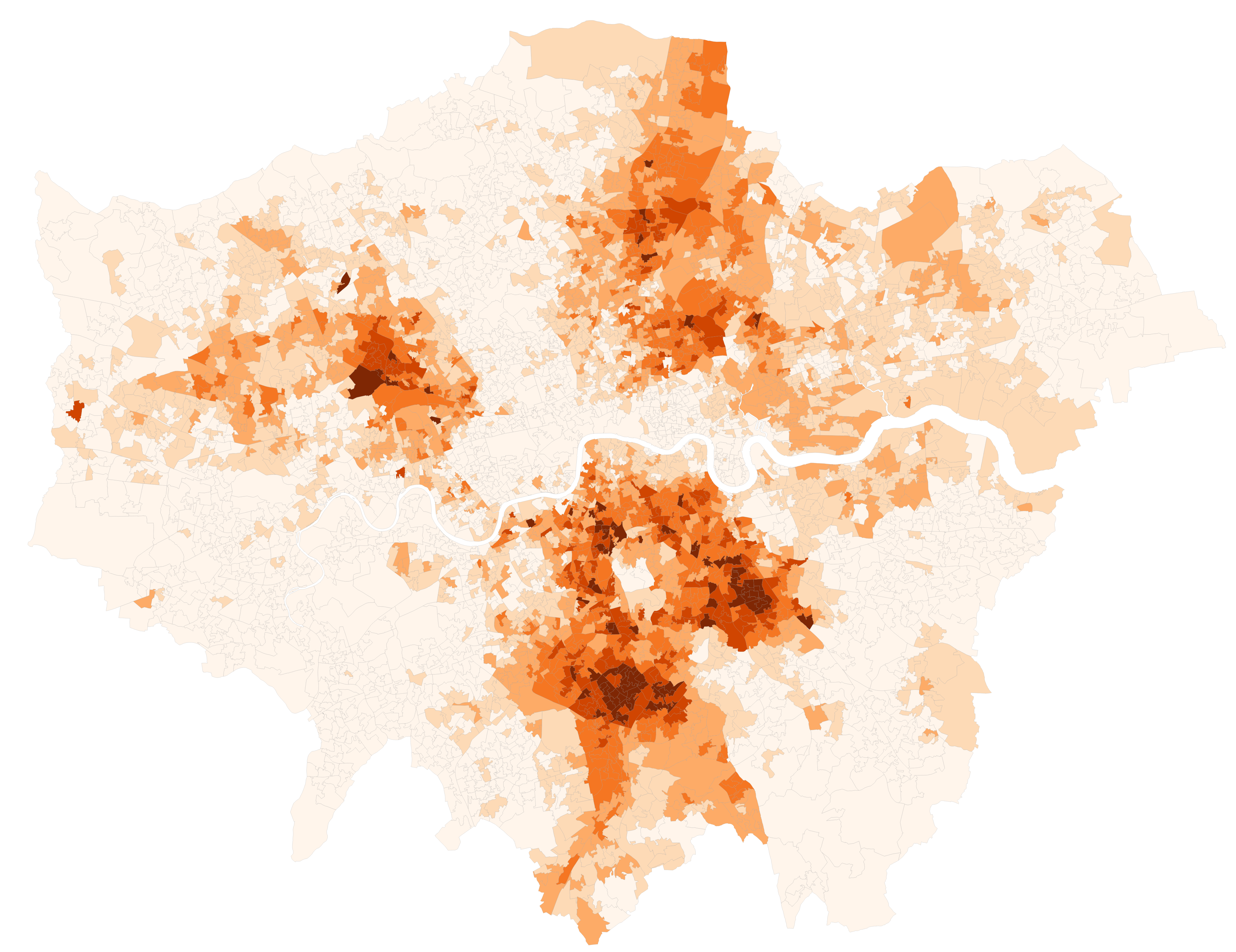
Black-Caribbean (2021)

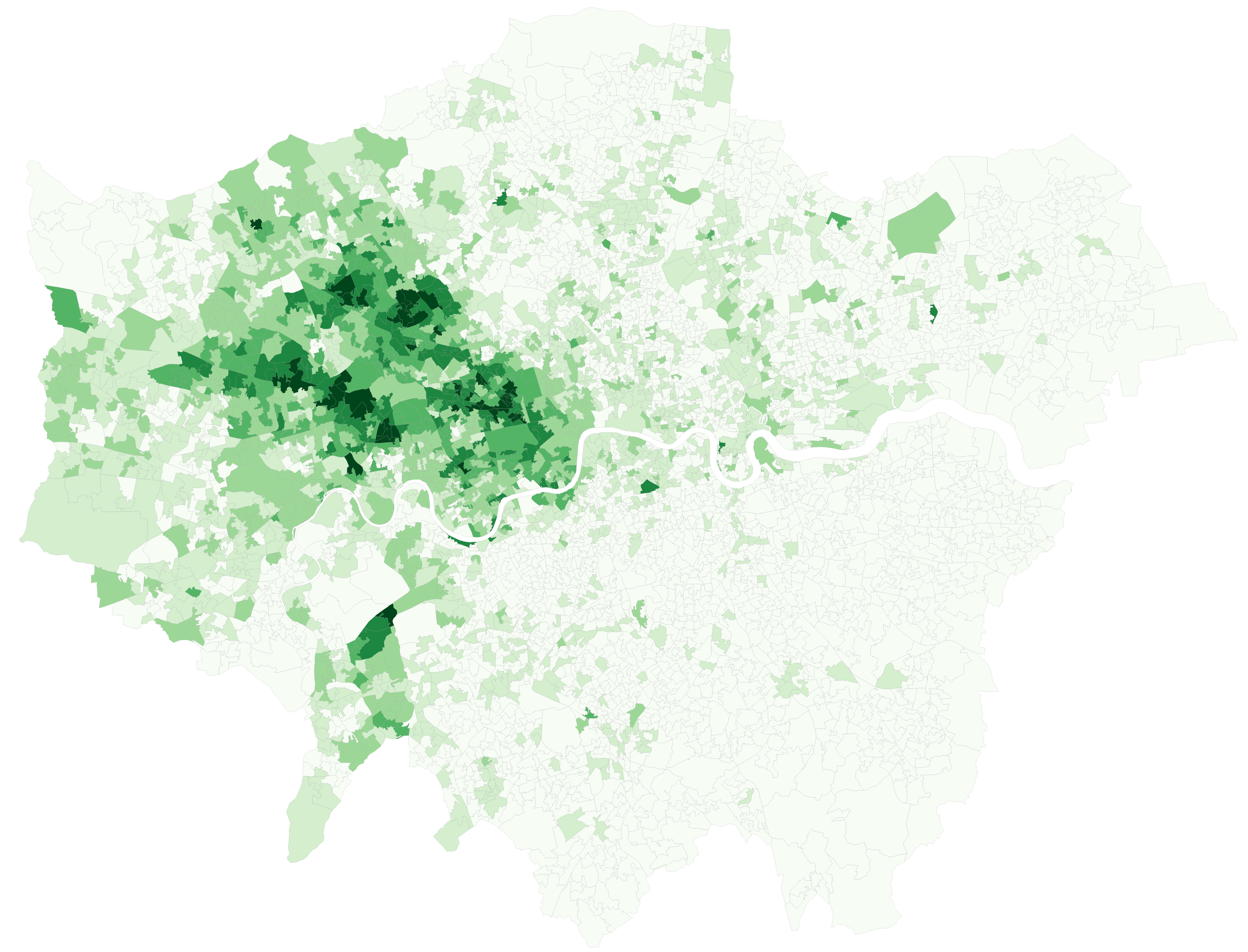
Other-Arab (2021)

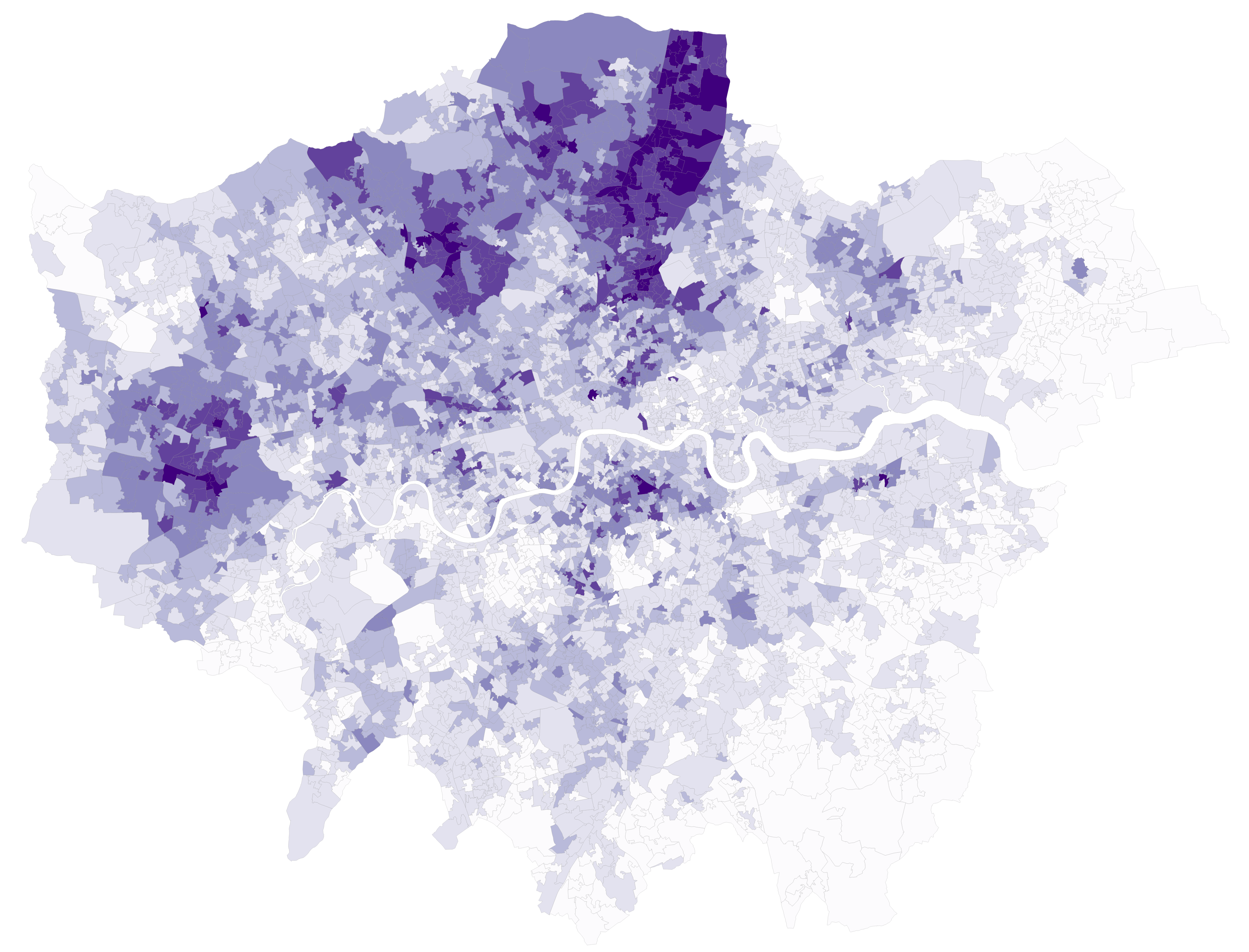
Other-Any Other Ethnic Group (2021)

Population pyramid of London by ethnicity in 2021

Population pyramids of each ethnic group in London

White: Total

White British

White Irish

White Other

Asian: Total

Asian Bangladeshi

Asian Indian

Asian Pakistani

Asian Chinese

Other Asian

Black: Total

Black: Caribbean

Black: African

Other Black

Mixed: Total

Other: Total

Other: Any other ethnic group

Other: Arabs

=== Ethnicity by borough ===
This table includes detailed ethnic groups by borough

	Number																Percent															
Borough / Ethnic group	British	Irish	Gypsy/Irish Traveller	Roma	White Other	Mixed	Bangladeshi	Chinese	Indian	Pakistani	Asian Other	Black African	Black Caribbean	Black Other	Arab	Any other	British	Irish	Gypsy/Irish Traveller	Roma	White Other	Mixed	Bangladeshi	Chinese	Indian	Pakistani	Asian Other	Black African	Black Caribbean	Black Other	Arab	Any other
Barking and Dagenham	67,558	1,191	189	854	28,514	9,327	22,382	1,378	11,482	15,789	5,514	35,093	5,840	5,867	1,493	6,395	30.87%	0.54%	0.09%	0.39%	13.03%	4.26%	10.23%	0.63%	5.25%	7.21%	2.52%	16.03%	2.67%	2.68%	0.68%	2.92%
Barnet	140,792	7,629	178	1,557	74,620	20,928	2,887	9,395	30,397	6,708	25,591	22,651	4,946	3,026	7,374	30,722	36.16%	1.96%	0.05%	0.40%	19.16%	5.37%	0.74%	2.41%	7.81%	1.72%	6.57%	5.82%	1.27%	0.78%	1.89%	7.89%
Bexley	158,871	2,523	619	312	14,863	8,759	1,777	4,002	10,909	1,399	6,354	23,241	3,236	3,576	534	5,545	64.45%	1.02%	0.25%	0.13%	6.03%	3.55%	0.72%	1.62%	4.43%	0.57%	2.58%	9.43%	1.31%	1.45%	0.22%	2.25%
Brent	51,629	9,302	236	2,508	54,017	17,301	2,166	3,397	66,167	15,199	24,570	31,088	21,266	7,178	17,921	15,944	15.19%	2.74%	0.07%	0.74%	15.89%	5.09%	0.64%	1.00%	19.47%	4.47%	7.23%	9.15%	6.26%	2.11%	5.27%	4.69%
Bromley	219,488	4,962	575	553	26,704	17,730	1,747	5,088	12,311	1,780	6,381	13,208	8,142	3,788	1,207	6,272	66.52%	1.50%	0.17%	0.17%	8.09%	5.37%	0.53%	1.54%	3.73%	0.54%	1.93%	4.00%	2.47%	1.15%	0.37%	1.90%
Camden	74,343	5,330	134	988	44,295	13,968	14,371	6,720	6,933	1,603	8,389	14,206	2,686	1,992	4,412	9,795	35.37%	2.54%	0.06%	0.47%	21.08%	6.65%	6.84%	3.20%	3.30%	0.76%	3.99%	6.76%	1.28%	0.95%	2.10%	4.66%
City of London	3,652	186	-	62	2,065	467	283	544	322	32	259	150	54	26	113	369	42.54%	2.17%	0.00%	0.72%	24.06%	5.44%	3.30%	6.34%	3.75%	0.37%	3.02%	1.75%	0.63%	0.30%	1.32%	4.30%
Croydon	146,256	4,914	213	1,114	36,436	29,743	3,549	3,914	29,562	15,346	16,118	40,228	36,094	12,102	2,272	12,836	37.43%	1.26%	0.05%	0.29%	9.33%	7.61%	0.91%	1.00%	7.57%	3.93%	4.13%	10.30%	9.24%	3.10%	0.58%	3.29%
Ealing	89,263	8,526	251	1,433	59,008	19,165	3,677	4,540	54,822	16,715	31,523	22,590	12,893	4,018	16,098	22,661	24.31%	2.32%	0.07%	0.39%	16.07%	5.22%	1.00%	1.24%	14.93%	4.55%	8.59%	6.15%	3.51%	1.09%	4.38%	6.17%
Enfield	103,123	5,968	372	1,121	61,268	19,563	8,132	2,679	11,881	3,650	11,607	36,462	16,996	7,033	2,534	37,525	31.26%	1.81%	0.11%	0.34%	18.57%	5.93%	2.46%	0.81%	3.60%	1.11%	3.52%	11.05%	5.15%	2.13%	0.77%	11.37%
Greenwich	119,678	4,250	386	894	35,847	17,260	2,389	7,130	10,132	3,555	14,833	44,196	8,722	7,691	1,455	10,667	41.40%	1.47%	0.13%	0.31%	12.40%	5.97%	0.83%	2.47%	3.50%	1.23%	5.13%	15.29%	3.02%	2.66%	0.50%	3.69%
Hackney	87,919	5,579	245	864	43,107	17,512	6,552	3,452	8,815	2,465	5,588	29,480	17,896	7,240	2,343	20,067	33.93%	2.15%	0.09%	0.33%	16.64%	6.76%	2.53%	1.33%	3.40%	0.95%	2.16%	11.38%	6.91%	2.79%	0.90%	7.74%
Hammersmith and Fulham	70,095	4,809	95	1,480	39,164	12,332	1,276	4,242	4,091	2,001	7,665	13,257	6,653	2,615	5,523	7,881	38.27%	2.63%	0.05%	0.81%	21.38%	6.73%	0.70%	2.32%	2.23%	1.09%	4.18%	7.24%	3.63%	1.43%	3.02%	4.30%
Haringey	84,309	5,711	228	2,016	58,358	18,577	4,847	3,861	5,851	2,156	6,419	24,865	16,339	5,300	2,545	23,038	31.88%	2.16%	0.09%	0.76%	22.07%	7.03%	1.83%	1.46%	2.21%	0.82%	2.43%	9.40%	6.18%	2.00%	0.96%	8.71%
Harrow	53,565	5,595	175	1,418	34,455	9,801	1,824	2,781	74,741	10,278	28,558	10,595	6,533	2,067	6,238	12,625	20.50%	2.14%	0.07%	0.54%	13.19%	3.75%	0.70%	1.06%	28.61%	3.93%	10.93%	4.06%	2.50%	0.79%	2.39%	4.83%
Havering	174,252	2,903	256	432	19,521	9,710	4,779	2,003	11,288	5,678	4,400	14,136	4,816	2,596	804	4,481	66.49%	1.11%	0.10%	0.16%	7.45%	3.71%	1.82%	0.76%	4.31%	2.17%	1.68%	5.39%	1.84%	0.99%	0.31%	1.71%
Hillingdon	113,355	5,592	480	692	27,230	13,396	4,055	3,191	57,367	14,233	23,136	15,827	5,745	2,378	4,463	14,802	37.05%	1.83%	0.16%	0.23%	8.90%	4.38%	1.33%	1.04%	18.75%	4.65%	7.56%	5.17%	1.88%	0.78%	1.46%	4.84%
Hounslow	81,945	3,886	299	980	39,965	13,493	2,698	2,678	60,829	17,443	22,191	14,891	3,574	2,341	5,476	15,470	28.44%	1.35%	0.10%	0.34%	13.87%	4.68%	0.94%	0.93%	21.11%	6.05%	7.70%	5.17%	1.24%	0.81%	1.90%	5.37%
Islington	86,101	7,077	107	963	40,507	16,230	5,967	5,128	4,042	996	5,396	18,064	7,359	3,283	2,999	12,331	39.76%	3.27%	0.05%	0.44%	18.71%	7.49%	2.76%	2.37%	1.87%	0.46%	2.49%	8.34%	3.40%	1.52%	1.38%	5.69%
Kensington and Chelsea	46,875	2,811	82	1,042	40,574	9,517	1,483	3,829	3,215	1,276	7,212	6,944	3,231	1,103	6,358	7,769	32.71%	1.96%	0.06%	0.73%	28.31%	6.64%	1.03%	2.67%	2.24%	0.89%	5.03%	4.85%	2.25%	0.77%	4.44%	5.42%
Kingston upon Thames	90,262	2,636	63	436	21,395	9,002	939	4,118	7,729	4,391	12,769	3,093	1,083	537	3,569	5,959	53.73%	1.57%	0.04%	0.26%	12.74%	5.36%	0.56%	2.45%	4.60%	2.61%	7.60%	1.84%	0.64%	0.32%	2.12%	3.55%
Lambeth	119,410	6,825	142	1,563	46,881	25,623	2,505	5,022	6,060	3,865	5,623	37,360	28,996	9,789	2,635	15,414	37.58%	2.15%	0.04%	0.49%	14.76%	8.06%	0.79%	1.58%	1.91%	1.22%	1.77%	11.76%	9.13%	3.08%	0.83%	4.85%
Lewisham	111,717	5,038	114	1,035	36,808	24,218	1,830	6,301	5,044	2,345	11,401	37,844	31,889	10,730	1,668	12,471	37.18%	1.68%	0.04%	0.34%	12.25%	8.06%	0.61%	2.10%	1.68%	0.78%	3.79%	12.60%	10.61%	3.57%	0.56%	4.15%
Merton	88,662	4,332	188	826	35,602	12,778	2,478	3,612	9,637	9,652	14,655	12,217	7,636	3,043	1,919	7,983	41.20%	2.01%	0.09%	0.38%	16.54%	5.94%	1.15%	1.68%	4.48%	4.48%	6.81%	5.68%	3.55%	1.41%	0.89%	3.71%
Newham	51,799	2,046	354	2,344	51,404	16,423	55,699	6,218	38,622	31,217	16,429	40,885	13,547	6,843	3,541	13,614	14.76%	0.58%	0.10%	0.67%	14.65%	4.68%	15.87%	1.77%	11.00%	8.89%	4.68%	11.65%	3.86%	1.95%	1.01%	3.88%
Redbridge	71,874	3,102	185	1,087	31,764	12,725	31,893	2,923	51,198	43,992	16,835	14,609	8,482	3,062	2,260	14,362	23.16%	1.00%	0.06%	0.35%	10.23%	4.10%	10.28%	0.94%	16.50%	14.17%	5.42%	4.71%	2.73%	0.99%	0.73%	4.63%
Richmond upon Thames	123,085	4,866	86	401	28,644	10,656	915	2,789	7,248	1,766	4,803	2,265	950	487	1,714	4,626	63.02%	2.49%	0.04%	0.21%	14.67%	5.46%	0.47%	1.43%	3.71%	0.90%	2.46%	1.16%	0.49%	0.25%	0.88%	2.37%
Southwark	109,247	6,029	153	1,592	41,208	22,171	5,548	8,390	6,136	2,012	8,437	48,325	18,155	10,817	3,139	16,300	35.51%	1.96%	0.05%	0.52%	13.39%	7.21%	1.80%	2.73%	1.99%	0.65%	2.74%	15.71%	5.90%	3.52%	1.02%	5.30%
Sutton	120,043	3,117	129	334	19,569	10,147	1,783	3,983	12,611	6,191	12,212	7,436	3,447	1,587	1,393	5,680	57.26%	1.49%	0.06%	0.16%	9.33%	4.84%	0.85%	1.90%	6.01%	2.95%	5.82%	3.55%	1.64%	0.76%	0.66%	2.71%
Tower Hamlets	71,175	3,551	113	2,218	45,193	15,322	107,335	10,295	10,109	3,338	6,759	15,383	4,914	2,390	3,588	8,501	22.95%	1.14%	0.04%	0.72%	14.57%	4.94%	34.60%	3.32%	3.26%	1.08%	2.18%	4.96%	1.58%	0.77%	1.16%	2.74%
Waltham Forest	94,769	4,236	198	1,403	46,449	18,031	5,153	2,629	9,111	28,745	9,878	18,764	17,579	5,293	2,867	13,355	34.03%	1.52%	0.07%	0.50%	16.68%	6.48%	1.85%	0.94%	3.27%	10.32%	3.55%	6.74%	6.31%	1.90%	1.03%	4.80%
Wandsworth	157,030	8,053	121	1,720	55,122	20,638	1,642	4,657	9,593	12,262	10,143	17,320	11,347	4,339	3,847	9,575	47.96%	2.46%	0.04%	0.53%	16.84%	6.30%	0.50%	1.42%	2.93%	3.75%	3.10%	5.29%	3.47%	1.33%	1.17%	2.92%
Westminster	57,201	3,720	48	1,519	50,264	13,360	7,520	6,601	7,972	2,476	9,661	10,456	4,305	1,703	15,432	12,011	28.01%	1.82%	0.02%	0.74%	24.61%	6.54%	3.68%	3.23%	3.90%	1.21%	4.73%	5.12%	2.11%	0.83%	7.56%	5.88%

Ethnicity of school pupils

Ethnicity of school pupils within London
Ethnic group	School year																	
Ethnic group	1998		2001		2004		2008		2012		2015/16		2017/18		2019/20		2021/2022	
Ethnic group	Number	%	Number	%	Number	%	Number	%	Number	%	Number	%	Number	%	Number	%	Number	%
White: Total	521,826	59.8%			467,230	51.4%	431,040	46.7%	416,490	42.8%	443,621	41.1%	522,187	40.4%	520,767	39.8%	506,271	38.7%
White: British	–	–	–	–	389,350	42.9%	339,610	36.8%	305,805	31.4%	295,572	27.4%	333,497	25.8%	324,358	24.8%	312,522	23.9%
White: Irish	–	–	–	–	10,610	1.2%	8,610	0.9%	7,610	0.8%	6,939	0.6%	7,322	0.6%	6,759	0.5%	6,268	0.5%
White: Traveller of Irish heritage	–	–	–	–	1,090	0.1%	920	0.1!	1,000	0.1%	1,031	0.1%	1,183	0.1%	1,205	0.1%	1,182	0.1%
White: Gypsy/Roma	–	–	–	–	780	0.09%	950	0.1%	1,505	0.2%	1,643	0.2%	2,074	0.2%	2,359	0.2%	2,358	0.2%
White: Other	–	–	–	–	65,410	7.2%	80,950	8.8%	100,570	10.3%	138,436	12.8%	178,111	13.8%	186,086	14.2%	183,941	14.0%
Asian / Asian British: Total	135,057	15.5%			159,370	17.5%	174,380	18.9%	198,280	20.4%	228,767	21.2%	283,443	22%	296,324	22.6%	305,069	23.2%
Asian / Asian British: Indian	65,823	7.5%			57,990	6.4%	54,570	5.9%	54,490	5.6%	62,065	5.7%	78,700	6.1%	85,521	6.5%	89,639	6.8%
Asian / Asian British: Pakistani	27,366	3.1%			31,220	3.4%	34,680	3.8%	41,235	4.2%	47,931	4.4%	59,047	4.6%	60,415	4.6%	60,707	4.6%
Asian / Asian British: Bangladeshi	34,053	3.9%			38,880	4.2%	44,100	4.8%	51,300	5.3%	59,691	5.5%	73,994	5.7%	77,408	5.9%	79,954	6.1%
Asian / Asian British: Chinese	7,815	0.9%			7,220	0.8%	6,970	0.8%	6,920	0.7%	7,883	0.7%	10,116	0.8%	10,475	0.8%	12,267	0.9%
Asian / Asian British: Other Asians	–	–	–	–	24,060	2.6%	34,060	3.7%	44,335	4.6%	51,197	4.7%	61,586	4.8%	62,505	4.8%	62,502	4.8%
Black / Black British: Total	140,661	16.1%			170,780	18.8%	188,750	20.5%	208,375	21.4%	226,215	20.9%	254,081	19.7%	244,988	18.7%	234,822	17.9%
Black: Caribbean	57,253	6.6%			63,020	6.9%	59,750	6.5%	57,980	5.9%	55,414	5.1%	57,862	4.5%	53,733	4.1%	50,178	3.8%
Black: African	56,223	6.4%			91,020	10%	110,090	11.92%	128,295	13.1%	145,447	13.5%	167,058	12.9%	162,680	12.4%	156,883	12.0%
Black: Other Blacks	27,185	3.1%			16,740	1.8%	18,930	2.1%	22,100	2.3%	25,354	2.3%	29,161	2.3%	28,575	2.2%	27,761	2.1%
Mixed / British Mixed	–	–	–	–	57,720	6.4%	70,330	7.6%	84,615	8.7%	104,470	9.7%	134,226	10.4%	142,135	10.8%	150,285	11.3%
Other: Total	60,734	7%			34,750	3.8%	44,290	4.8%	52,640	5.4%	60,865	5.6%	74,589	5.7%	77,413	5.9%	82,516	6.3%
Unclassified	14,857	1.7%			18,760	2.1%	6,750	0.7%	13,470	1.4%	16,194	1.5%	22,232	1.7%	27,935	2.1%	30,359	2.3%
Total:	873,145	100%			908,600	100%	922,890	100%	973,875	100%	1,080,132	100%	1,290,758	100%	1,309,562	100%	1,309,322	100%

School pupils as a percentage of the school population in each borough in 2021/2022 school year

White: Total

White: British

Ethnicity of births

Ethnic Group	Year											
Ethnic Group	1981 estimates		2007		2010		2015		2019		2021	
Ethnic Group	Number	%	Number	%	Number	%	Number	%	Number	%	Number	%
White: Total	–	80%	58,024	46.4%	65,117	49.5%	61,716	47.8%	57,405	48.7%	53,141	48%
White: British	–	–	–	–	–	–	–	–	–	–	25,827	23.3%
White: Other	–	–	–	–	–	–	–	–	–	–	27,314	24.7%
Asian / Asian British: Total	–	–	21,701	17.3%	24,445	18.5%	26,957	20.9%	24,616	20.9%	24,426	22.1%
Asian / Asian British: Indian	–	–	–	–	–	–	–	–	–	–	8,259	7.5%
Asian / Asian British: Pakistani	–	–	–	–	–	–	–	–	–	–	4,341	3.9%
Asian / Asian British: Bangladeshi	–	–	–	–	–	–	–	–	–	–	5,458	4.9%
Asian / Asian British: Other Asians	–	–	–	–	–	–	–	–	–	–	6,368	5.8%
Black / Black British: Total	–	–	22,036	17.6%	22,293	16.9%	18,526	14.3%	15,319	13%	13,476	12.2%
Black: Caribbean	–	–	–	–	–	–	–	–	–	–	2,893	2.6%
Black: African	–	–	–	–	–	–	–	–	–	–	8,697	7.9%
Black: Other Blacks	–	–	–	–	–	–	–	–	–	–	1,886	1.7%
Mixed / British Mixed	–	–	7,967	6.3%	9,424	7.1%	11,979	9.3%	12,041	10.2%	12,502	11.3%
Other: Total	–	–	6,337	5%	5,831	4.4%	6,770	5.2%	6,494	5.5%	5,367	4.8%
Not Stated	–	–	9,055	7.2%	4,391	3.3%	3,170	2.4%	1,880	1.5%	1,787	1.6%
Non-White: Total (not including Not stated)	–	20%	58,041	46.2%	61,993	46.9%	64,232	49.7%	58,470	49.6%	55,771	50.4%
Total:	–	100%	125,120	100%	131,501	100%	129,118	100%	117,755	100%	110,699	100%

Ethnicity of births as a percentage of total births in 2021

White (49.6% including Not stated)

White: British (24.9% including Not stated)

Asian (22.1%)

Black (12.2%)

Mixed (11.3%)
White multi-ethnic group over time

1991 (79.8%)

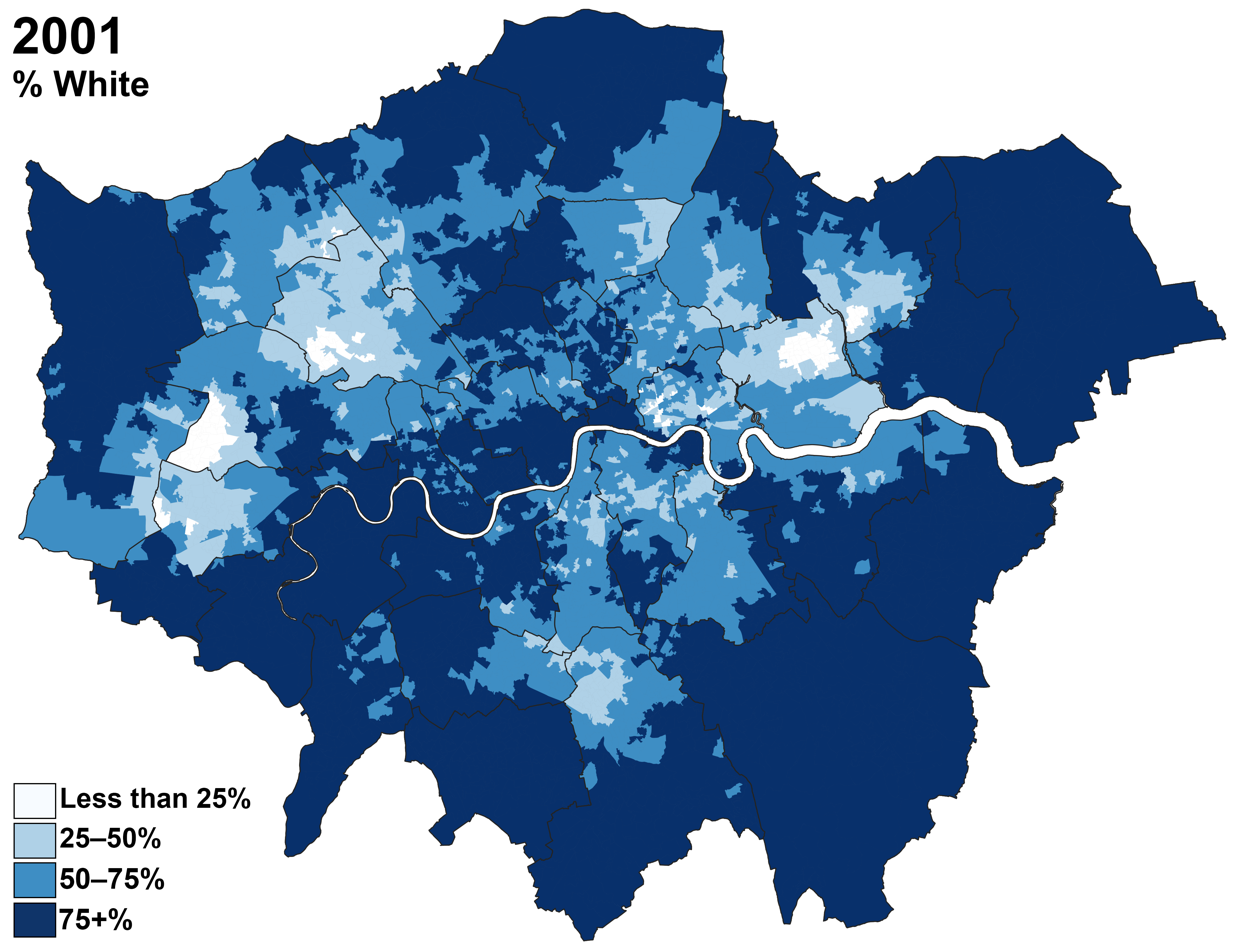
2001 (71.2%)

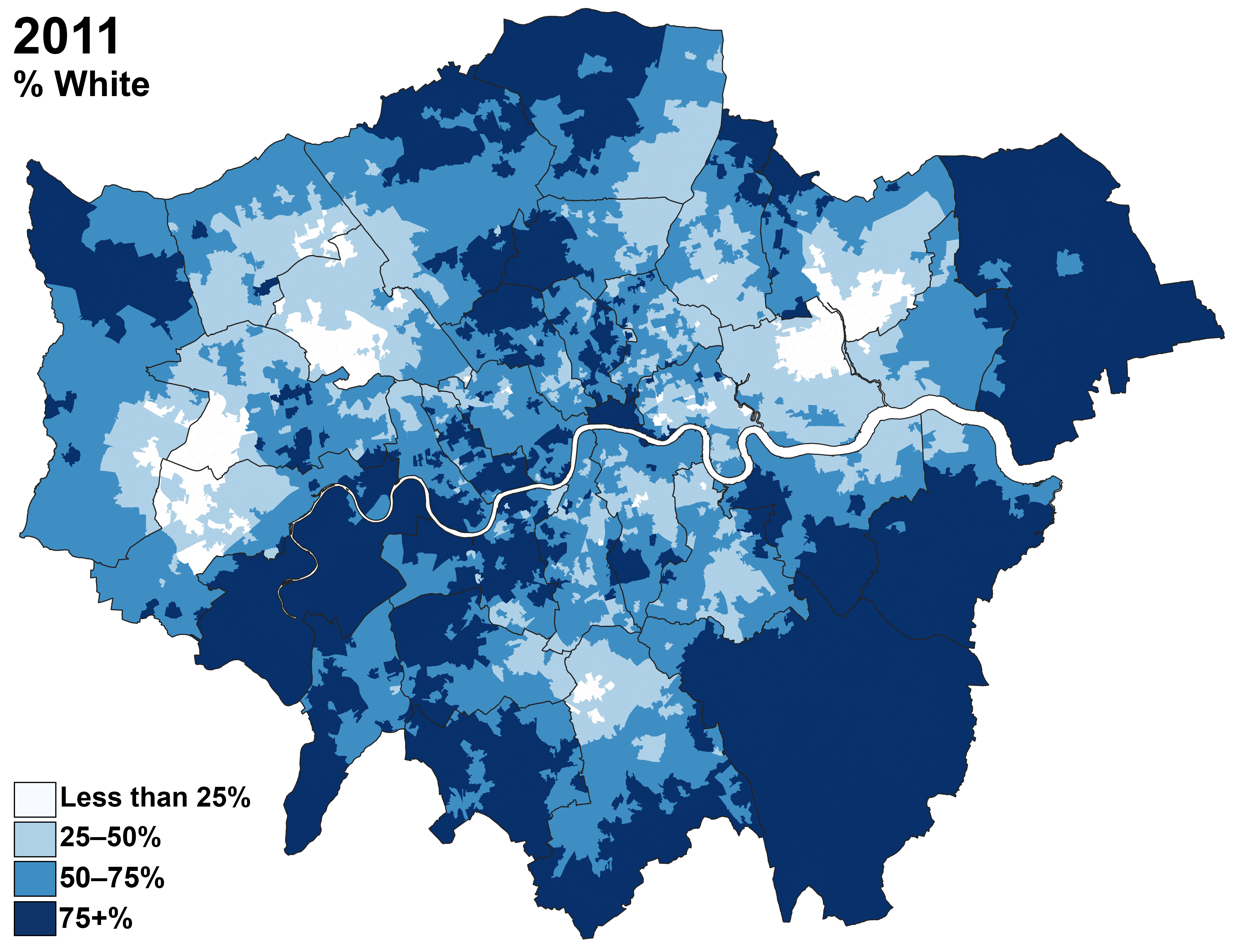
2011 (59.8%)

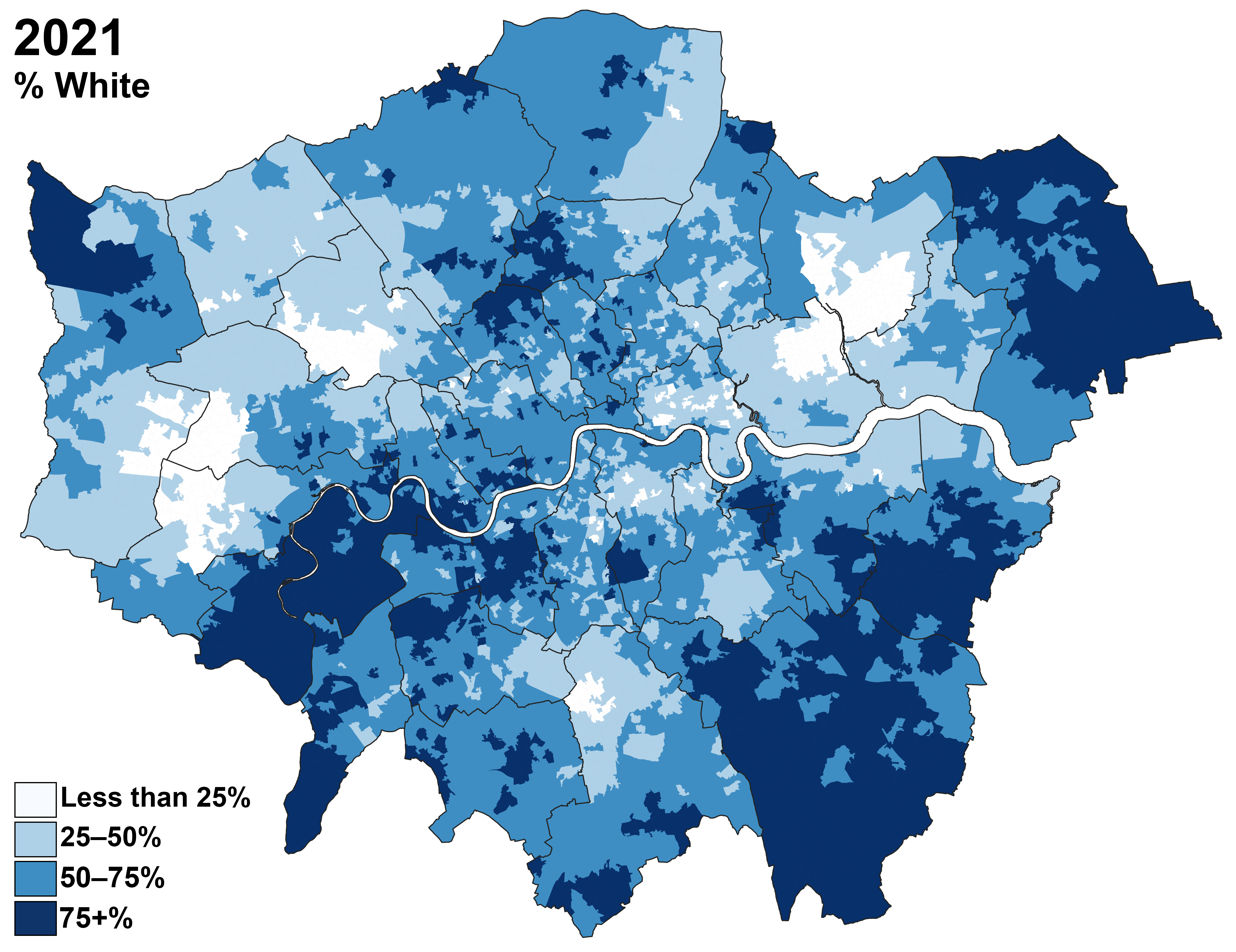
2021 (53.8%)
Asian multi-ethnic group over time

1991 (10.3%)

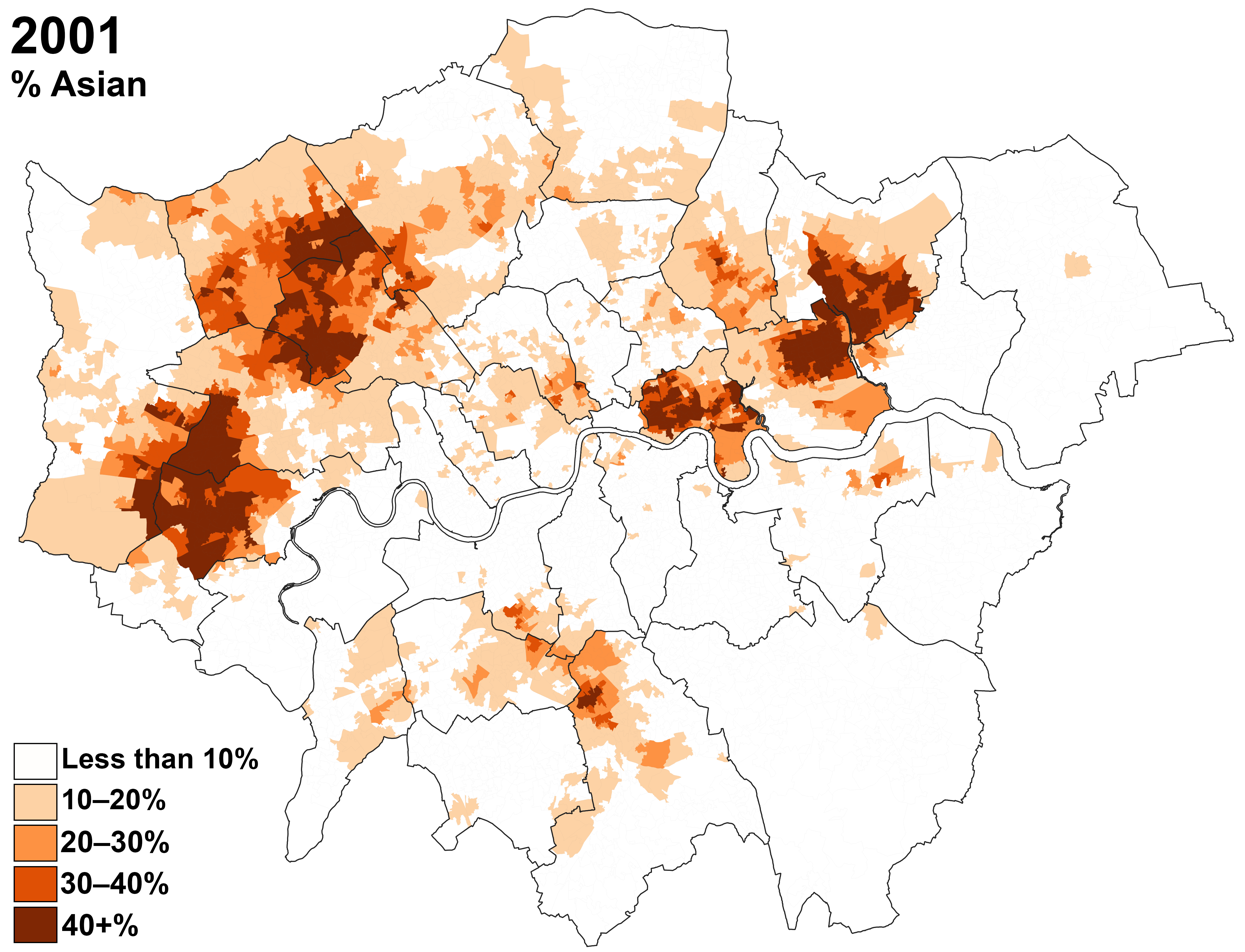
2001 (13.2%)

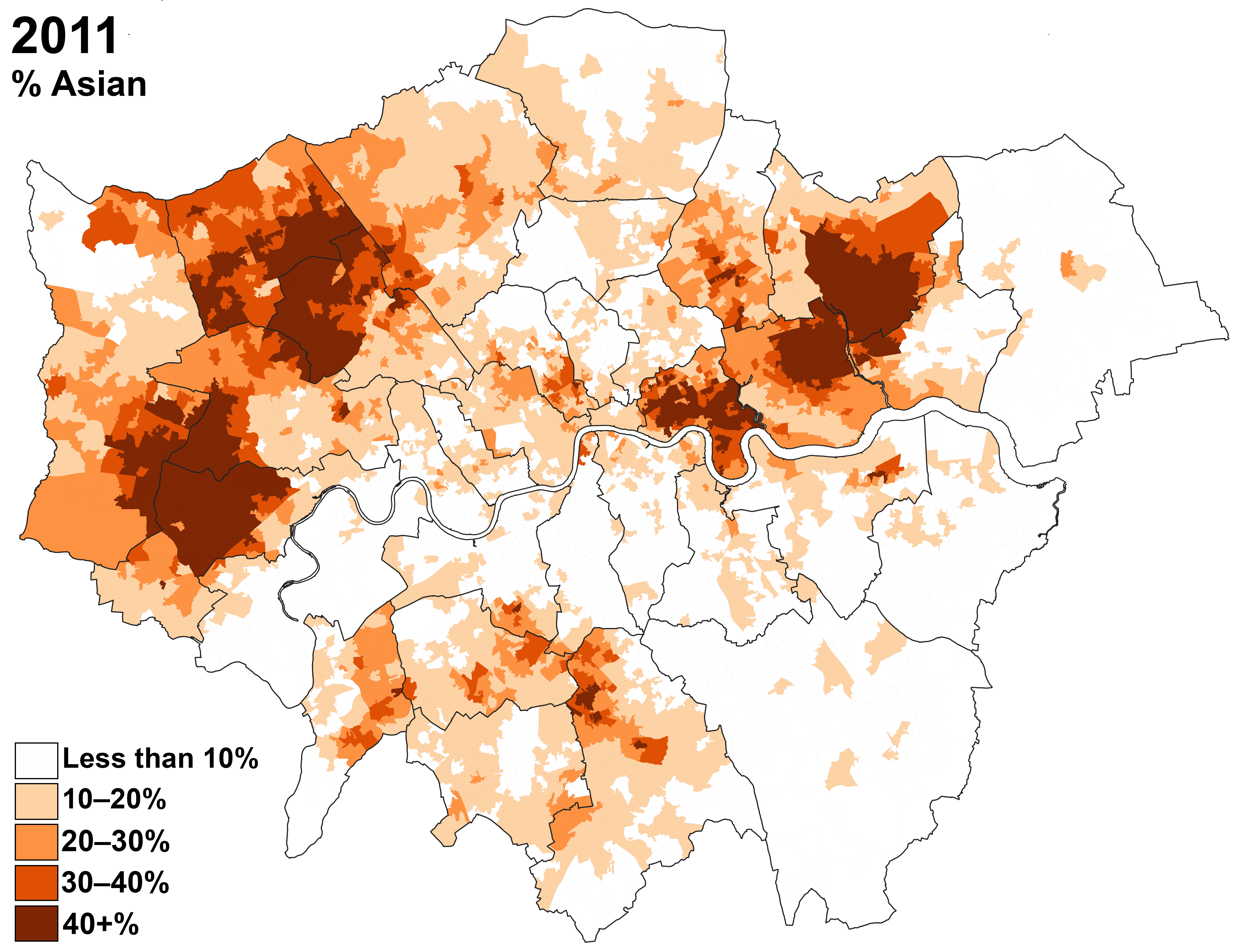
2011 (18.5%)

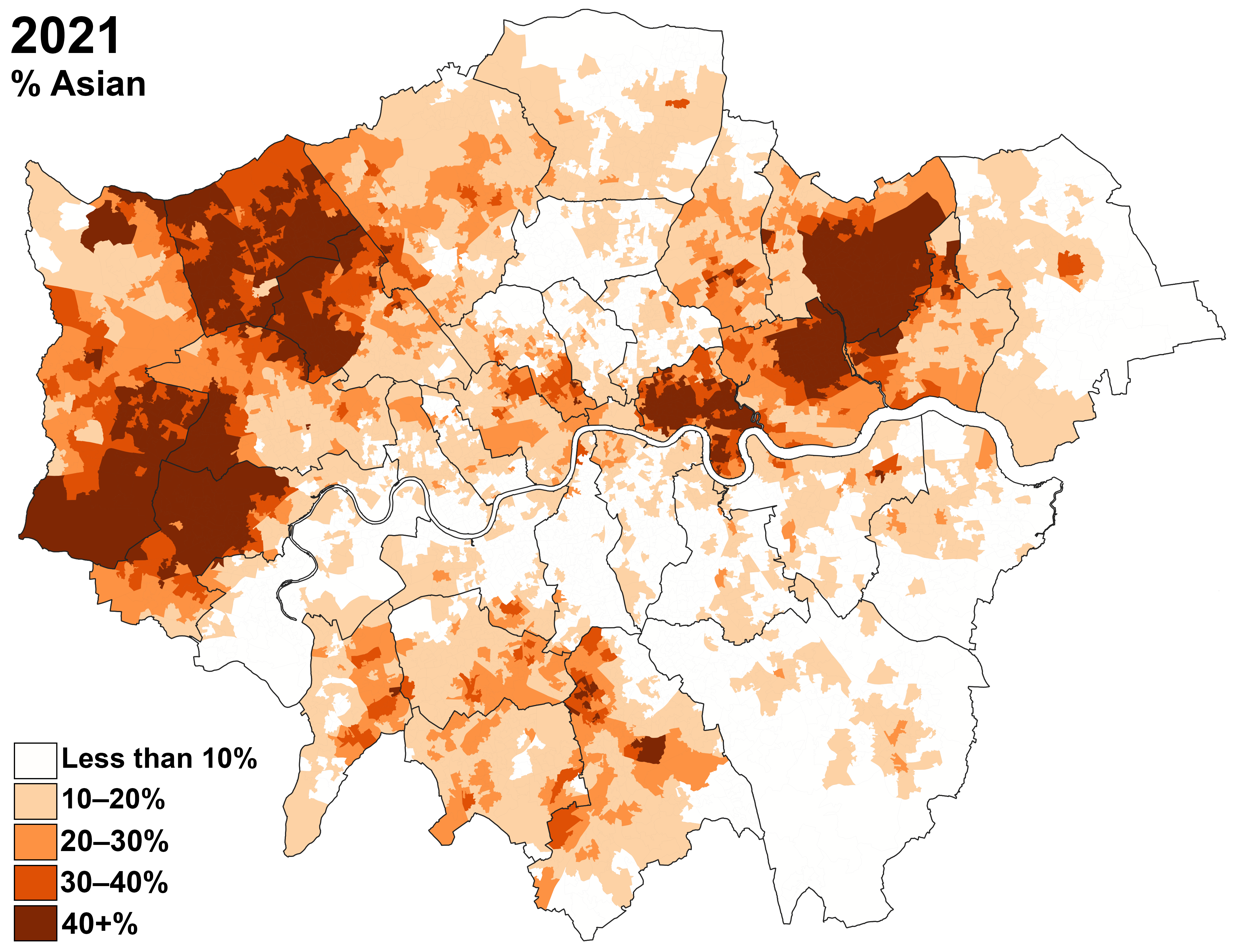
2021 (20.8%)
Black multi-ethnic group over time

1991 (8%)

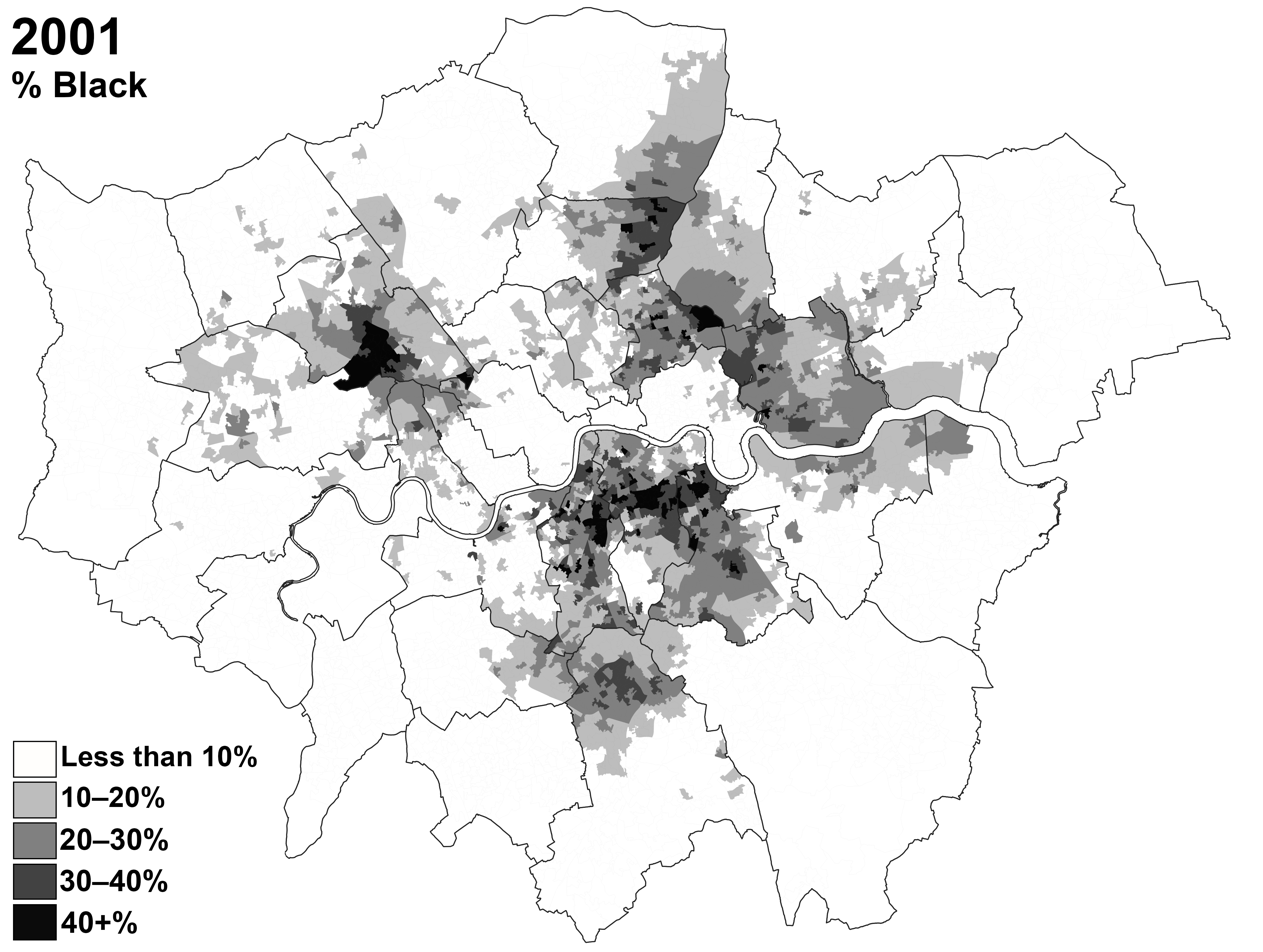
2001 (10.9%)

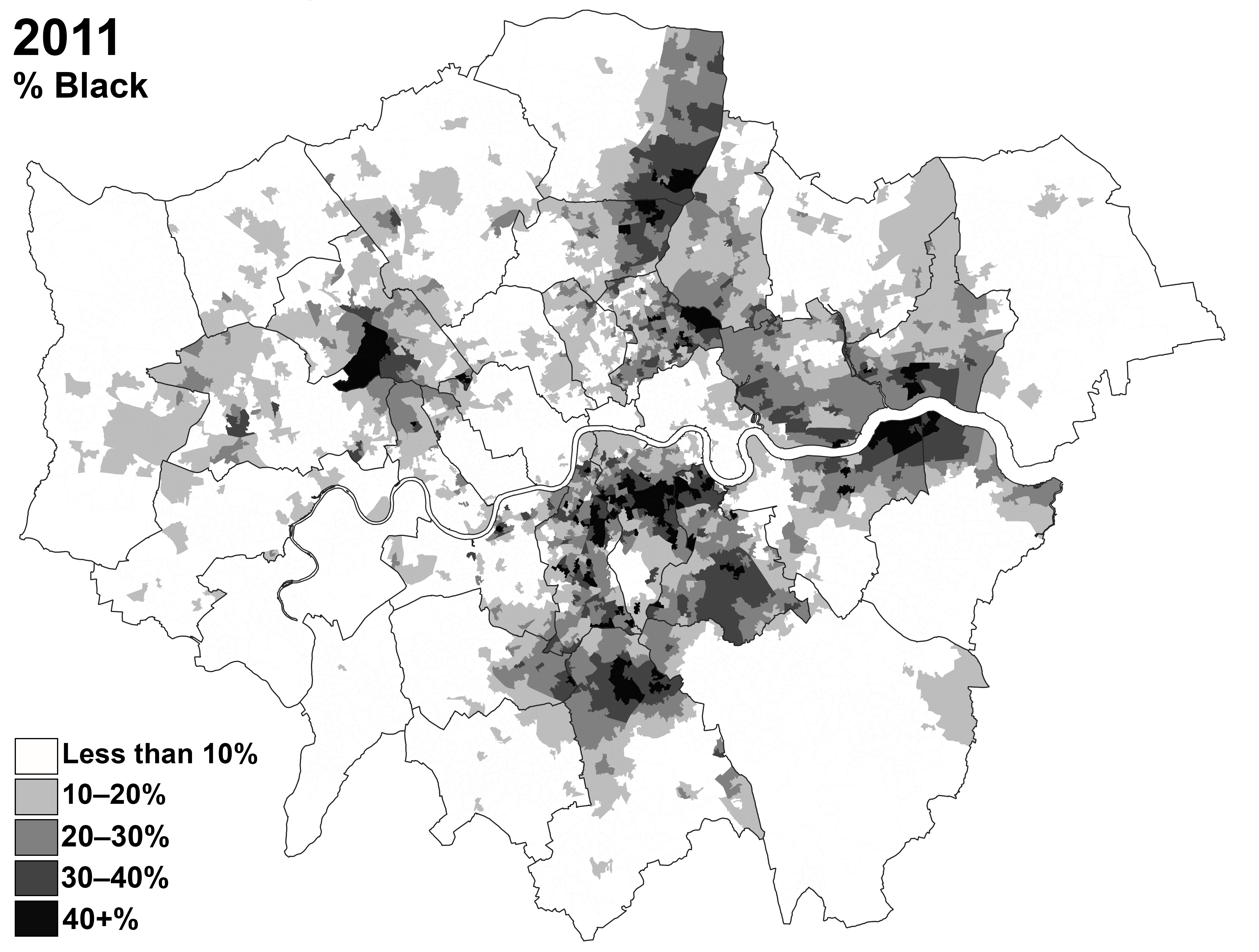
2011 (13.3%)

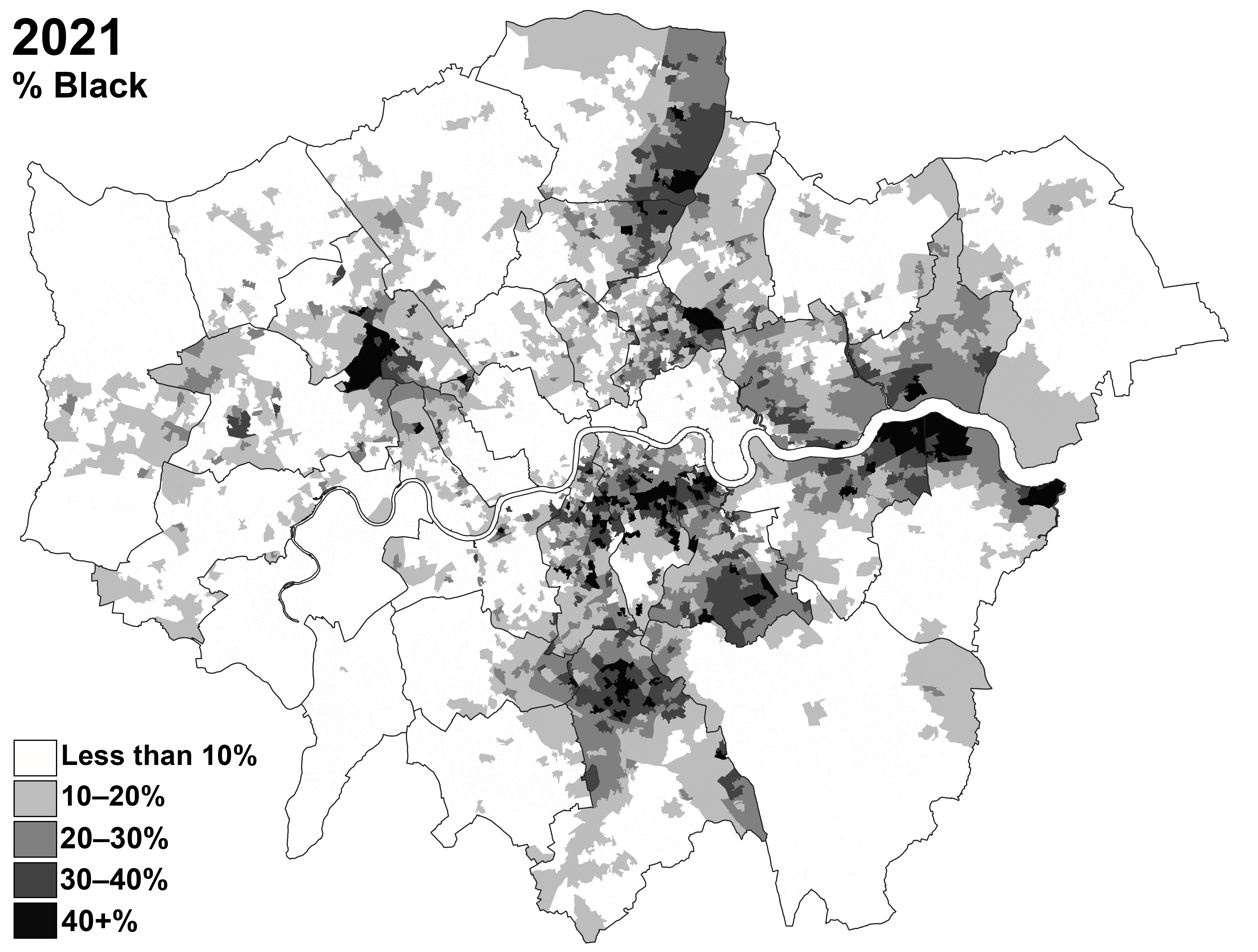
2021 (13.5%)

== Country of birth ==
Foreign born within London, from 1851 to 2021

Foreign born in London by age, 1991 to 2021

The 2021 UK born and foreign born population pyramid in London. Males and females representing the UK born population, while foreign males and females representing the foreign born population.

Foreign born and UK born percentage of age groups in London

The 2021 census recorded that 3,575,740 people or 40.7% of London's population are foreign-born, including 27.9% born in a non-European country.

Country of Birth	Year													
Country of Birth	1951 (County of London)		1971 census		1981 census		1991 census		2001 census		2011 census		2021 census	
Country of Birth	Number	%	Number	%	Number	%	Number	%	Number	%	Number	%	Number	%
Europe	3,239,240	96.8%	6,568,348	90.76%	5,787,624	87.57%	5,639,192	84.4%	5,741,636	80%	6,174,371	75.5%	6,346,649	72.1%
United Kingdom	3,018,418	90.2%	6,133,105	84.74%	5,405,576	81.79%	5,228,658	78.3%	5,231,701	72.9%	5,175,677	63.3%	5,223,986	59.3%
England	2,871,072	85.8%			5,175,884	78.3%	5,001,658	74.9%	5,010,969	69.9%	4,997,072	61.1%	5,075,165	57.7%
Scotland	62,980				109,935	1.7%	113,117	1.7%	108,682	1.5%	89,527	1.1%	75,004	0.9%
Wales	59,416				79,000	1.2%	70,532	1.1%	71,962	1.0%	53,828	0.7%	44,806	0.5%
Northern Ireland							42,243	0.6%	37,574	0.5%	32,774	0.4%	28,248	0.3%
(Republic of Ireland) Ireland	89,895		236,396	3.26%	199,460	3.01%	214,033	3.2%	157,556	2.2%	129,807	1.6%	96,566	1.1%
European Community or Other Europe	130,927	3.9%	198,847	2.74%	182,588	2.76%	196,501		352,379		865,681		1,122,663	12.8%
Germany	18,024						32,027	0.5%	39,818	0.6%	55,476	0.7%	50,364	0.6%
France	8,081						20,923	0.3%	38,130	0.5%	66,654	0.8%	77,715	0.9%
Italy	9,603						30,052	0.4%	38,694	0.5%	62,050	0.8%	126,059	1.4%
Spain							19,047	0.3%	22,480	0.3%	35,880	0.4%	68,114	0.8%
Poland	32,787						21,823	0.3%	22,224	0.3%	158,300	1.9%	149,397	1.7%
Romania	1,737						1,774	0.0%	3,049	0.0%	44,848	0.5%	175,991	2.0%
Cyprus	6,799						50,684	0.8%	45,888	0.6%			35,300	0.4%
Russia	16,046						5,234	0.1%	10,361	0.1%	16,757	0.2%	25,770	0.3%
Turkey	1,080						20,426	0.3%	39,128	0.5%	59,596	0.7%	72,867	0.8%
Asia	20,999	0.6%	161,777	2.23%	234,599	3.54%	435,819	6.5%	634,917	8.9%	966,990	11.8%	1,146,247	13%
India	16,370		104,001	1.43%	139,123	2.10%	151,619	2.3%	172,661	2.4%	262,247	3.2%	322,644	3.7%
Pakistan	1,578		29,395	0.40%	35,625	0.53%	44,741	0.7%	66,658	0.9%	112,457	1.4%	129,774	1.5%
Bangladesh	1,578		29,395	0.40%	22,108	0.33%	56,657	0.8%	84,565	1.2%	109,948	1.3%	138,895	1.6%
Sri Lanka							25,818	0.4%	49,932	0.7%	84,542	1.0%	80,379	0.9%
China	1,350						6,996	0.1%	13,776	0.2%	39,452	0.5%	56,116	0.6%
Hong Kong	586						18,398	0.3%	23,328	0.3%	26,435	0.3%	33,760	0.4%
Other Asia	–	–	28,381	0.39%	37,741	0.57%	–	–	–	–	–	–	–	–
Old Commonwealth	14,233	0.4%	38,738	0.53%	37,064	0.56%	53,320	0.8%	84,264		–	–	84,248	
Australia	6,536						23,315	0.3%	41,488	0.6%	53,959	0.7%	43,418	0.5%
Canada	5,339						11,626	0.2%	15,282	0.2%	21,288	0.3%	21,772	0.2%
New Zealand	2,358						18,379	0.3%	27,494	0.4%	28,547	0.3%	19,058	0.2%
Africa	10,783	0.3%	74,660	1.03%	144,072	2.18%	246,025		454,536		621,613		625,071	7.1%
South Africa	4,668						6,471	0.1%	45,507	0.6%	57,765	0.7%	47,964	0.5%
Nigeria	1,261						36,047	0.5%	68,907	1.0%	114,718	1.4%	117,145	1.3%
Kenya	314						56,993	0.9%	66,311	0.9%	64,212	0.8%	58,020	0.7%
Ghana							26,925	0.4%			62,896	0.8%	65,905	0.7%
Somalia	50								33,831	0.5%	65,333	0.8%	66,288	0.8%
America/Caribbean (NCWP for 1971)	12,241	0.4%	165,369	2.28%	167,399	2.53%			249,191		326,280		367,664	4.2%
Jamaica	2,139						76,445	1.1%	80,319	1.1%	87,467	1.1%	52,613	0.6%
United States	5,942						32,667	0.5%	44,622	0.6%	63,920	0.8%	71,127	0.8%
Brazil	357						–				31,357	0.4%	55,787	0.6%
Antarctica and Oceania (including Australasia) and Other	–	–	–	–	–	–	–	–	70,632		84,661		64,228	0.7%
British Overseas	–	–	–	–	–	–	–	–	–	–	–	–	5,994	–
Other: Total	–	–	227,829	3.14%	237,840	3.59%	1,118		21,179		26		–	–
Foreign born: Total	224,801	9.8%	1,103,616				1,451,041	21.7%	1,940,390	27.1%	2,998,264	36.7%	3,575,740	40.7%
Total	3,347,982	100%	7,236,721	100.00%	6,608,598	100.00%	6,679,699	100%	7,172,091	100%	8,173,941	100%	8,799,726	100%

NOTE: The sub-categories included for each continent may not add up to their respective total amount because the sub-categories are only supposed to show the most numerous country of birth from said area.

Foreign born in the County of London (excluding Irish born)

1901 (5% overall including Irish born)

1911 (5% overall including Irish born)

1921 (4% overall including Irish born)

1931 (5% overall including Irish born)

1951 (8% overall including Irish born)
Foreign born in London over time

1961 (9.8%)

1971 (15.3%)

1981 (18.2%)

1991 (21.7%)

2001 (27.1%)

2011 (36.7%)

2021 (40.7%)

Region of birth of mother	1969		1990		2001		2006		2011		2016		2021	
Region of birth of mother	Number	%	Number	%	Number	%	Number	%	Number	%	Number	%	Number	%
United Kingdom	80,796	68.6%	72,108	68.2%	59,104	56.7%	57,376	47.5%	57,450	43.2%	53,866	41.8%	47,958	43.2%
Foreign born	36,993	31.4%	33,594	31.8%	45,058	43.3%	63,522	52.5%	75,383	56.7%	74,923	58.2%	62,986	56.8%
EU					6,977	6.7%	11,309	9.4%	18,402	13.8%	22,573	17.5%	18,365	16.5%
Rest of Europe					3,380	3.2%	4,090	3.4%	4,160	3.1%	5,382	4.2%	5,933	5.3%
Middle East and Asia					13,489	13%	18,206	15%	25,478	19.2%	24,235	18.8%	21,394	19.2%
Africa					13,600	13.1%	20,043	16.6%	19,866	15%	15,600	12.1%	10,725	9.7%
Rest of the world					7,612	7.3%	9,874	8.2%	7,477	5.6%	7,133	5.5%	6,569	5.9%
Total	117,789	100%	105,702	100%	104,162	100%	120,898	100%	132,843	100%	128,803	100%	110,961	100%

Born to foreign born mothers

2007

2014

2021
Population pyramids of country of birth groupings in 2021

UK born

Foreign born: Total

=== Country of birth by borough ===
This table shows country of birth by London borough according to 2021 census:

London top 30 sources of immigration by borough
Barking and Dagenham			Barnet			Bexley			Brent			Bromley			Camden			Croydon			Ealing			Enfield		
1	Nigeria	9,434	1	Romania	13,430	1	Nigeria	8,831	1	India	35,203	1	India	6,842	1	United States	5,912	1	India	14,374	1	India	31,819	1	Turkey	17,053
2	Romania	9,416	2	India	11,335	2	India	5,488	2	Romania	17,722	2	Nigeria	3,515	2	Bangladesh	5,814	2	Jamaica	9,397	2	Poland	18,816	2	Cyprus EU	9,972
3	Bangladesh	9,290	3	Iran	11,227	3	Romania	2,415	3	Poland	7,235	3	Ireland	2,942	3	France	5,265	3	Poland	7,979	3	Pakistan	7,757	3	Bulgaria	8,264
4	Pakistan	7,275	4	Poland	7,551	4	Poland	2,082	4	Somalia	6,678	4	Poland	2,826	4	Italy	4,442	4	Ghana	7,244	4	Afghanistan	7,006	4	Romania	6,812
5	India	6,677	5	Israel	4,720	5	Ireland	1,871	5	Pakistan	6,585	5	Romania	2,426	5	India	3,270	5	Pakistan	6,960	5	Sri Lanka	6,020	5	Poland	5,894
6	Lithuania	5,494	6	Ireland	4,681	6	Ghana	1,640	6	Kenya	6,370	6	South Africa	1,939	6	China	3,111	6	Nigeria	6,185	6	Somalia	5,848	6	Albania	4,921
7	Ghana	3,320	7	Italy	4,533	7	Sri Lanka	1,309	7	Ireland	5,850	7	Italy	1,872	7	Ireland	3,064	7	Sri Lanka	5,165	7	Ireland	5,316	7	Ghana	4,738
8	Bulgaria	2,749	8	Kenya	4,384	8	Lithuania	1,280	8	Sri Lanka	5,672	8	Jamaica	1,753	8	Somalia	2,954	8	Romania	4,860	8	Italy	5,243	8	Jamaica	4,072
9	Poland	2,321	9	Philippines	3,902	9	Nepal	1,203	9	Brazil	5,532	9	China	1,738	9	Germany	2,408	9	Italy	3,268	9	Romania	4,986	9	Nigeria	3,861
10	Moldova	2,222	10	Nigeria	3,846	10	Bulgaria	1,198	10	Jamaica	5,423	10	Sri Lanka	1,514	10	Spain	2,309	10	Ireland	3,164	10	Iraq	4,779	10	Somalia	3,807
11	Italy	2,073	11	Afghanistan	3,729	11	China	1,143	11	Italy	4,662	11	Brazil	1,499	11	Australia	2,069	11	Portugal	3,104	11	Iran	3,796	11	India	3,730
12	Albania	1,394	12	Albania	3,680	12	Italy	1,018	12	Philippines	4,415	12	France	1,403	12	Philippines	2,063	12	Kenya	3,088	12	Kenya	3,760	12	Bangladesh	3,537
13	Somalia	1,311	13	South Africa	3,232	13	Bangladesh	829	13	Iraq	3,646	13	Philippines	1,324	13	Iran	1,943	13	Uganda	2,328	13	Japan	2,974	13	Ireland	3,283
14	Kosovo	1,261	14	China	3,074	14	Kenya	826	14	Portugal	3,528	14	Germany	1,285	14	Kosovo	1,919	14	Bulgaria	2,214	14	France	2,780	14	Italy	3,167
15	Portugal	1,253	15	Pakistan	3,042	15	Hong Kong	744	15	Afghanistan	3,504	15	United States	1,225	15	Poland	1,901	15	Brazil	2,186	15	Syria	2,747	15	Mauritius	2,839
16	Philippines	1,122	16	Bulgaria	3,021	16	Vietnam	740	16	Syria	2,898	16	Bulgaria	1,208	16	South Africa	1,735	16	Spain	1,982	16	Nepal	2,643	16	Greece	2,438
17	Ireland	1,072	17	Turkey	2,811	17	Jamaica	691	17	Spain	2,670	17	Ghana	1,128	17	Greece	1,712	17	Mauritius	1,857	17	Spain	2,409	17	Sri Lanka	2,194
18	DR Congo	1,003	18	Cyprus EU	2,732	18	Pakistan	685	18	Nigeria	2,559	18	Lithuania	1,116	18	Japan	1,638	18	France	1,682	18	Portugal	2,212	18	Kenya	1,897
19	Jamaica	970	19	Sri Lanka	2,564	19	South Africa	679	19	Uganda	2,447	19	Turkey	1,073	19	Russia	1,584	19	Germany	1,581	19	Bangladesh	2,111	19	Iran	1,710
20	Sri Lanka	952	20	United States	2,470	20	Turkey	655	20	Ghana	2,358	20	Spain	1,064	20	Brazil	1,453	20	South Africa	1,551	20	Philippines	2,059	20	DR Congo	1,685
21	Kenya	892	21	Hong Kong	2,400	21	Germany	629	21	France	2,339	21	Australia	1,026	21	Canada	1,391	21	Turkey	1,507	21	Brazil	2,036	21	Pakistan	1,489
22	Zimbabwe	765	22	Somalia	2,276	22	Zimbabwe	628	22	Iran	2,192	22	Hong Kong	1,007	22	Hong Kong	1,343	22	Guyana	1,480	22	Bulgaria	2,019	22	Kosovo	1,465
23	Uganda	711	23	Portugal	2,248	23	Cyprus EU	627	23	Kuwait	1,839	23	Portugal	994	23	Portugal	1,298	23	Bangladesh	1,468	23	Jamaica	1,983	23	Uganda	1,280
24	Spain	635	24	Hungary	2,206	24	Albania	577	24	Hungary	1,831	24	Albania	959	24	Turkey	1,224	24	Afghanistan	1,463	24	United States	1,900	24	Portugal	1,207
25	Turkey	612	25	Brazil	2,193	25	Sierra Leone	561	25	Morocco	1,655	25	Cyprus EU	914	25	Israel	1,193	25	Philippines	1,437	25	Lebanon	1,687	25	Philippines	1,132
26	Ukraine	588	26	Greece	2,118	26	France	533	26	United States	1,501	26	Kenya	846	26	Romania	1,115	26	Somalia	1,226	26	Germany	1,630	26	Spain	1,129
27	China	551	27	France	2,109	27	United States	511	27	Nepal	1,493	27	Zimbabwe	824	27	Nigeria	1,063	27	China	1,203	27	Nigeria	1,603	27	Brazil	963
28	Afghanistan	543	28	Ghana	2,013	28	Portugal	483	28	Bulgaria	1,462	28	Pakistan	822	28	Malaysia	1,023	28	United States	1,171	28	China	1,529	28	Hungary	943
29	Sierra Leone	534	29	Kosovo	2,003	29	Spain	483	29	Tanzania	1,348	29	Bangladesh	713	29	Cyprus EU	801	29	Zimbabwe	1,144	29	Greece	1,521	29	Germany	862
30	Germany	520	30	Spain	1,987	30	Moldova	454	30	China	1,328	30	Russia	694	30	Colombia	790	30	Lithuania	1,088	30	South Africa	1,437	30	Lithuania	831
Greenwich			Hackney			Hammersmith and Fulham			Haringey			Harrow			Havering			Hillingdon			Hounslow			Islington		
1	Nigeria	14,357	1	Turkey	8,674	1	Italy	5,408	1	Turkey	9,465	1	India	26,376	1	Romania	5,393	1	India	27,738	1	India	38,028	1	Italy	5,079
2	Nepal	5,963	2	Nigeria	5,239	2	France	5,094	2	Poland	7,212	2	Romania	21,082	2	India	4,603	2	Pakistan	6,466	2	Poland	11,105	2	France	4,346
3	India	5,746	3	Italy	4,378	3	United States	3,422	3	Romania	6,353	3	Kenya	10,859	3	Nigeria	4,137	3	Poland	6,398	3	Pakistan	8,255	3	Turkey	4,220
4	Romania	4,812	4	France	3,926	4	Spain	3,258	4	Bulgaria	5,905	4	Sri Lanka	10,706	4	Lithuania	2,841	4	Afghanistan	6,324	4	Afghanistan	6,444	4	United States	4,149
5	Poland	3,449	5	United States	3,735	5	Ireland	3,036	5	Italy	5,279	5	Afghanistan	4,825	5	Pakistan	2,505	5	Romania	5,575	5	Romania	5,443	5	Ireland	4,116
6	Italy	3,065	6	Poland	3,529	6	Philippines	2,943	6	Jamaica	3,799	6	Pakistan	4,485	6	Ireland	2,082	6	Sri Lanka	5,106	6	Kenya	3,755	6	Australia	3,225
7	China	2,818	7	Ireland	3,311	7	Poland	2,553	7	Spain	3,357	7	Uganda	3,857	7	Bangladesh	1,910	7	Kenya	3,670	7	Nepal	3,429	7	Somalia	3,070
8	Lithuania	2,744	8	Jamaica	3,250	8	Somalia	2,446	8	Ireland	3,312	8	Poland	3,602	8	Poland	1,868	8	Ireland	3,511	8	Somalia	3,032	8	Spain	2,872
9	Ghana	2,730	9	Australia	3,188	9	Australia	2,318	9	Ghana	3,153	9	Ireland	3,245	9	Moldova	1,769	9	Somalia	3,281	9	Ireland	2,593	9	Bangladesh	2,381
10	Ireland	2,723	10	India	3,126	10	China	2,038	10	Cyprus EU	3,136	10	Tanzania	2,560	10	Ghana	1,246	10	Nepal	2,152	10	Italy	2,507	10	China	2,079
11	Bulgaria	2,225	11	Ghana	3,088	11	India	1,994	11	Brazil	3,045	11	Somalia	2,455	11	Bulgaria	1,172	11	Italy	1,934	11	Sri Lanka	2,392	11	Germany	1,958
12	Somalia	2,073	12	Spain	2,876	12	Germany	1,675	12	Albania	2,867	12	Nepal	1,580	12	Philippines	1,138	12	Bangladesh	1,927	12	Philippines	2,365	12	India	1,839
13	Jamaica	2,047	13	Bangladesh	2,511	13	Iran	1,635	13	Colombia	2,674	13	Iraq	1,506	13	Albania	935	13	Portugal	1,807	13	Portugal	2,031	13	Poland	1,806
14	France	1,959	14	Israel	2,386	14	Brazil	1,633	14	Somalia	2,642	14	Jamaica	1,505	14	Sri Lanka	764	14	Philippines	1,515	14	Bulgaria	1,960	14	Greece	1,782
15	Vietnam	1,908	15	Germany	2,230	15	Portugal	1,568	15	Nigeria	2,380	15	Italy	1,453	15	Italy	752	15	Nigeria	1,514	15	Lithuania	1,556	15	Nigeria	1,477
16	Hong Kong	1,799	16	Portugal	1,813	16	South Africa	1,564	16	United States	2,238	16	Kuwait	1,376	16	Zimbabwe	710	16	Uganda	1,381	16	Iran	1,491	16	Brazil	1,370
17	United States	1,779	17	Brazil	1,712	17	Greece	1,289	17	France	2,157	17	Iran	1,331	17	South Africa	681	17	Iraq	1,228	17	Moldova	1,405	17	Colombia	1,316
18	Spain	1,711	18	Colombia	1,524	18	Romania	1,186	18	Bangladesh	2,153	18	Nigeria	1,199	18	Jamaica	671	18	Germany	1,183	18	Spain	1,400	18	Portugal	1,292
19	Brazil	1,616	19	Somalia	1,512	19	Hong Kong	1,055	19	India	2,135	19	Philippines	1,172	19	Kenya	662	19	Hong Kong	1,142	19	France	1,391	19	Romania	1,244
20	Pakistan	1,601	20	Vietnam	1,336	20	Russia	1,026	20	Greece	2,087	20	Germany	1,165	20	China	592	20	Lithuania	1,138	20	United States	1,383	20	Canada	1,224
21	Germany	1,520	21	Canada	1,294	21	Iraq	1,008	21	Hungary	1,820	21	France	1,043	21	Turkey	588	21	Iran	1,126	21	Bangladesh	1,380	21	Cyprus EU	1,190
22	Portugal	1,473	22	New Zealand	1,257	22	Ethiopia	1,005	22	Portugal	1,676	22	Ghana	915	22	Germany	495	22	China	1,125	22	Uganda	1,332	22	Eritrea	1,164
23	South Africa	1,465	23	DR Congo	1,244	23	Canada	965	23	Germany	1,535	23	Hong Kong	820	23	Portugal	488	23	Moldova	997	23	Brazil	1,263	23	New Zealand	1,163
24	Sri Lanka	1,453	24	Cyprus EU	1,235	24	Nigeria	934	24	China	1,451	24	Bangladesh	812	24	Spain	485	24	Tanzania	976	24	Nigeria	1,205	24	Jamaica	1,122
25	Turkey	1,330	25	China	1,218	25	Pakistan	913	25	Australia	1,407	25	China	792	25	Ukraine	473	25	Bulgaria	959	25	Ghana	1,197	25	Hong Kong	1,102
26	Russia	1,103	26	Romania	1,211	26	Turkey	907	26	South Africa	1,214	26	Brazil	790	26	Hong Kong	460	26	South Africa	940	26	Ukraine	1,152	26	South Africa	1,065
27	Uganda	1,093	27	Belgium	1,135	27	New Zealand	879	27	Ecuador	1,165	27	Portugal	774	27	Uganda	434	27	United States	909	27	South Africa	1,123	27	Ethiopia	876
28	Bangladesh	1,051	28	Greece	1,036	28	Jamaica	850	28	Philippines	1,073	28	South Africa	766	28	Kosovo	433	28	Jamaica	904	28	Hong Kong	1,073	28	Philippines	868
29	Moldova	1,010	29	Pakistan	1,020	29	Colombia	817	29	Mauritius	1,036	29	Bulgaria	739	29	Cyprus EU	394	29	Spain	857	29	Germany	1,061	29	Iran	855
30	Australia	1,008	30	South Africa	964	30	Eritrea	797	30	DR Congo	1,031	30	United States	735	30	Mauritius	391	30	Brazil	845	30	Albania	1,059	30	Ghana	850
Kensington and Chelsea			Kingston upon Thames			Lambeth			Lewisham			Merton			Newham			Redbridge			Richmond upon Thames			Southwark		
1	United States	5,806	1	India	3,690	1	Jamaica	7,842	1	Nigeria	9,278	1	Poland	6,934	1	Bangladesh	26,860	1	India	23,651	1	India	3,292	1	Nigeria	11,173
2	Italy	5,518	2	Sri Lanka	3,365	2	Portugal	7,012	2	Jamaica	8,679	2	Sri Lanka	5,595	2	India	21,818	2	Pakistan	18,479	2	United States	2,841	2	Italy	5,939
3	France	5,272	3	Poland	2,568	3	Italy	5,675	3	Italy	4,047	3	Pakistan	4,925	3	Romania	17,455	3	Bangladesh	14,099	3	Ireland	2,832	3	Jamaica	4,553
4	Spain	2,992	4	Korea (South)	2,425	4	Nigeria	5,139	4	Romania	3,924	4	India	4,701	4	Pakistan	13,826	4	Romania	11,099	4	South Africa	2,618	4	Spain	4,520
5	Philippines	2,762	5	South Africa	2,059	5	Poland	4,817	5	Poland	3,841	5	South Africa	3,636	5	Italy	7,026	5	Sri Lanka	6,866	5	Poland	2,485	5	Ghana	4,321
6	Germany	1,952	6	Pakistan	1,979	6	Spain	4,344	6	Sri Lanka	3,275	6	Bulgaria	3,157	6	Lithuania	6,439	6	Moldova	4,295	6	Germany	2,106	6	Sierra Leone	4,262
7	China	1,890	7	Bulgaria	1,824	7	Ireland	4,230	7	Ireland	2,942	7	Ghana	3,037	7	Nigeria	5,813	7	Italy	3,428	7	Italy	2,042	7	France	3,789
8	Iran	1,841	8	Iraq	1,657	8	Ghana	4,106	8	Spain	2,908	8	Romania	2,932	8	Bulgaria	4,800	8	Kenya	3,425	8	Australia	1,892	8	Ireland	3,642
9	Russia	1,746	9	Ireland	1,630	9	France	3,828	9	Ghana	2,838	9	Italy	2,693	9	Poland	4,288	9	Lithuania	3,087	9	Turkey	1,831	9	United States	3,373
10	Ireland	1,745	10	Italy	1,609	10	Brazil	3,521	10	India	2,554	10	Ireland	2,628	10	Ghana	4,085	10	Poland	2,583	10	France	1,440	10	Colombia	3,371
11	India	1,698	11	China	1,548	11	Colombia	3,360	11	France	2,489	11	Brazil	2,133	11	Philippines	4,033	11	Bulgaria	2,430	11	Iran	1,389	11	China	3,352
12	Australia	1,684	12	Germany	1,544	12	United States	3,061	12	China	2,222	12	Jamaica	1,988	12	Moldova	3,985	12	Nigeria	2,321	12	Spain	1,292	12	India	3,003
13	Lebanon	1,492	13	Philippines	1,346	13	Australia	2,966	13	Brazil	2,190	13	Portugal	1,711	13	Sri Lanka	3,837	13	Ireland	2,043	13	Brazil	1,180	13	Poland	2,837
14	Portugal	1,437	14	Iran	1,298	14	Ecuador	2,914	14	United States	2,078	14	Spain	1,685	14	Somalia	3,755	14	Somalia	1,511	14	China	1,025	14	Brazil	2,505
15	Morocco	1,348	15	Romania	1,157	15	Somalia	2,511	15	Vietnam	1,884	15	France	1,571	15	Portugal	2,774	15	Mauritius	1,439	15	Hong Kong	985	15	Ecuador	2,441
16	Greece	1,325	16	United States	1,113	16	India	2,463	16	Germany	1,785	16	Germany	1,515	16	China	2,567	16	Uganda	1,425	16	Romania	944	16	Germany	2,323
17	Brazil	1,294	17	Hong Kong	1,110	17	Germany	2,179	17	Portugal	1,701	17	Philippines	1,473	17	Brazil	2,557	17	Jamaica	1,322	17	Russia	921	17	Bangladesh	2,181
18	Iraq	1,278	18	France	1,027	18	South Africa	2,102	18	Sierra Leone	1,559	18	United States	1,437	18	Spain	2,512	18	Albania	1,225	18	Afghanistan	916	18	Australia	2,165
19	Turkey	1,215	19	Brazil	926	19	Eritrea	1,841	19	Bulgaria	1,505	19	Nigeria	1,338	19	Jamaica	2,273	19	Ghana	1,199	19	New Zealand	856	19	Philippines	2,100
20	Poland	1,168	20	Spain	904	20	China	1,797	20	Colombia	1,409	20	China	1,211	20	Uganda	1,732	20	Afghanistan	1,140	20	Canada	845	20	Portugal	1,889
21	Canada	1,142	21	Portugal	862	21	Pakistan	1,617	21	Lithuania	1,359	21	Australia	1,162	21	Kenya	1,725	21	Turkey	1,110	21	Sweden	822	21	Bolivia	1,825
22	South Africa	1,026	22	Turkey	853	22	Romania	1,553	22	Cyprus EU	1,353	22	Bangladesh	1,092	22	France	1,679	22	France	1,090	22	Pakistan	775	22	Romania	1,758
23	Japan	906	23	Afghanistan	848	23	New Zealand	1,396	23	Turkey	1,351	23	Korea (South)	1,081	23	Ireland	1,486	23	Portugal	1,059	23	Bulgaria	765	23	Vietnam	1,658
24	Hong Kong	890	24	Australia	735	24	Philippines	1,313	24	Somalia	1,342	24	Turkey	1,048	24	Ukraine	1,366	24	Germany	934	24	Kenya	722	24	Somalia	1,509
25	Colombia	865	25	Kenya	706	25	Sierra Leone	1,149	25	Australia	1,316	25	Kenya	907	25	Hungary	1,328	25	Spain	930	25	Greece	683	25	Hong Kong	1,477
26	Switzerland	849	26	Albania	653	26	Ethiopia	1,146	26	Ecuador	1,266	26	Hong Kong	843	26	Afghanistan	1,219	26	Tanzania	866	26	Portugal	614	26	Greece	1,428
27	Kosovo	824	27	Russia	643	27	Bulgaria	1,129	27	South Africa	1,154	27	Uganda	842	27	Hong Kong	1,176	27	Ukraine	817	27	Hungary	588	27	South Africa	1,387
28	Romania	809	28	Greece	621	28	Hong Kong	1,084	28	Ivory Coast	1,149	28	Mauritius	814	28	Latvia	1,117	28	Cyprus EU	791	28	Japan	540	28	Dominican Republic	1,298
29	Sweden	808	29	Hungary	609	29	Canada	1,076	29	Philippines	1,087	29	Lithuania	767	29	Greece	1,010	29	China	723	29	Netherlands	528	29	Cyprus EU	1,272
30	Somalia	807	30	Lithuania	572	30	Vietnam	1,027	30	Pakistan	1,018	30	Zimbabwe	713	30	Germany	992	30	Philippines	719	30	Philippines	504	30	Canada	1,266
						Sutton			Tower Hamlets			Waltham Forrest			Wandsworth			Westminster								
						1	India	6,891	1	Bangladesh	43,561	1	Pakistan	11,035	1	Italy	6,864	1	United States	6,421						
						2	Sri Lanka	4,622	2	Italy	10,553	2	Romania	11,015	2	Pakistan	6,533	2	Italy	6,125						
						3	Poland	3,407	3	India	6,317	3	Poland	5,486	3	Poland	5,698	3	France	5,675						
						4	Pakistan	3,109	4	China	4,818	4	Bulgaria	5,438	4	Ireland	5,062	4	India	4,446						
						5	Bulgaria	2,231	5	France	4,562	5	Turkey	3,516	5	South Africa	4,860	5	Spain	3,593						
						6	Ireland	1,925	6	Spain	3,791	6	India	3,342	6	France	4,629	6	Iraq	3,328						
						7	Romania	1,890	7	Somalia	3,107	7	Jamaica	3,278	7	United States	4,486	7	Bangladesh	3,191						
						8	South Africa	1,645	8	Poland	3,077	8	Italy	2,944	8	India	4,280	8	China	3,088						
						9	China	1,412	9	Romania	2,765	9	Lithuania	2,529	9	Australia	4,062	9	Greece	2,631						
						10	Philippines	1,385	10	United States	2,728	10	Ghana	2,474	10	Spain	3,858	10	Germany	2,530						
						11	Italy	1,212	11	Germany	2,401	11	Ireland	2,471	11	Brazil	3,156	11	Iran	2,458						
						12	Ghana	1,212	12	Ireland	2,315	12	Bangladesh	2,285	12	Germany	2,976	12	Russia	2,442						
						13	Nigeria	1,144	13	Australia	2,239	13	Somalia	2,259	13	Jamaica	2,944	13	Philippines	2,415						
						14	Portugal	976	14	Brazil	2,218	14	Moldova	2,075	14	Philippines	2,713	14	Ireland	2,346						
						15	Germany	969	15	Greece	1,945	15	Nigeria	2,021	15	Somalia	2,630	15	Brazil	2,249						
						16	Turkey	969	16	Hong Kong	1,865	16	Sri Lanka	1,944	16	Portugal	2,357	16	Portugal	2,200						
						17	Hong Kong	924	17	Portugal	1,812	17	Spain	1,786	17	New Zealand	1,975	17	Australia	2,097						
						18	Brazil	904	18	Russia	1,700	18	Albania	1,693	18	Ghana	1,819	18	Lebanon	1,997						
						19	Bangladesh	833	19	Lithuania	1,683	19	Algeria	1,684	19	Romania	1,731	19	Poland	1,946						
						20	Mauritius	775	20	Pakistan	1,566	20	Mauritius	1,402	20	Turkey	1,647	20	Kuwait	1,918						
						21	Kenya	770	21	Bulgaria	1,539	21	Philippines	1,341	21	China	1,627	21	Morocco	1,853						
						22	Uganda	704	22	Turkey	1,476	22	France	1,330	22	Nigeria	1,594	22	Japan	1,714						
						23	Zimbabwe	702	23	Nigeria	1,459	23	Cyprus EU	1,290	23	Bulgaria	1,540	23	Turkey	1,599						
						24	Spain	670	24	South Africa	1,356	24	Portugal	1,263	24	Greece	1,466	24	Kosovo	1,471						
						25	Iran	667	25	Philippines	1,155	25	Ukraine	1,221	25	Hong Kong	1,459	25	Romania	1,428						
						26	Albania	660	26	Malaysia	1,128	26	Germany	1,167	26	Canada	1,447	26	Canada	1,398						
						27	Jamaica	636	27	Vietnam	1,113	27	Brazil	1,149	27	Sri Lanka	1,297	27	South Africa	1,365						
						28	France	630	28	Hungary	1,078	28	United States	1,112	28	Russia	1,260	28	Hong Kong	1,363						
						29	Korea (South)	604	29	Canada	1,061	29	Hungary	1,058	29	Colombia	1,229	29	Sudan	1,299						
						30	Lithuania	593	30	New Zealand	922	30	Afghanistan	1,054	30	Kenya	1,149	30	Egypt	1,265						

== Languages ==
The percentage of London's population whose main language is English, 2021

In the 2011 Census, 6,083,420 or 77.9% of London's population aged 3 and over spoke English as a main language. A further 1,406,912 (19.8%) spoke it as a second language, or well to very well. 271,693 (3.5%) could not speak English well, while 47,917 (0.6%) could not speak English at all.

2,456 (<0.1%) spoke other UK minority languages, with the most common being Welsh and 2,926 (<0.1%) used British Sign Language. This shows great challenges for TfL and other government services. For example most ticket vending machines use only English, French and up to 2 other western Europe hemisphere languages, while as shown below most demand is for Indian languages, Polish, etc.

The most common main languages spoken in Greater London in the 2011 and 2021 censuses are shown below.

=== Main language ===
Languages spoken in London by usual residents aged 3+
Language	2011		2021	
Language	Number	Percentage	Number	Percentage
English	6,083,420	77.9%	6,650,973	78.4%
Romanian	39,653	0.5%	159,338	1.9%
Spanish	71,192	0.9%	117,457	1.4%
Polish	147,816	1.9%	112,068	1.3%
Bengali	114,267	1.5%	101,975	1.2%
Portuguese	71,525	0.9%	94,205	1.1%
Gujarati	101,676	1.3%	82,610	1.0%
Italian	49,484	0.6%	81,293	1.0%
Punjabi	68,525	0.9%	74,205	0.9%
Arabic	70,602	0.9%	72,102	0.8%
Tamil	70,565	0.9%	70,673	0.8%
Turkish	71,242	0.9%	69,641	0.8%
French	84,191	1.1%	67,049	0.8%
Urdu	78,667	1.0%	63,626	0.8%
Bulgarian			47,648	0.6%
Persian	39,645	0.5%	39,233	0.5%
Somali	54,852	0.7%	37,346	0.4%
Malayalam	26,924	0.3%	36,015	0.4%
Russian	26,603	0.3%	31,906	0.4%
Lithuanian	35,341	0.5%	30,768	0.4%
German	31,306	0.4%	19,074	0.2%
Other	441,968	5.7%		

=== Proficiency in English ===
Language proficiency	London (aged 3 and over)			
Language proficiency	2011		2021	
Language proficiency	Number	%	Number	%
Main language is English	6,083,420	77.9%	6,650,973	78.4%
Main language is not English	1,726,522	22.1%	1,831,690	21.6%
Can speak English very well	763,502	9.8%	840,463	9.9%
Can speak English well	643,410	8.2%	636,226	7.5%
Cannot speak English well	271,693	3.5%	303,265	3.6%
Cannot speak English	47,917	0.6%	51,736	0.6%
Total	7,809,942	100%	8,482,663	100%

== Religion ==
The religious identity of Londoners, in single year age groups, 2021

In 2001, Christians were the majority of London's population, at 58.23%. In 2021, the Christian percentage was 40.66%. The population identifying with no religion rose from 15.76% in 2001, to 27.05% in 2021. This shift suggests a growing trend of secularization in London.

The Muslim population increased from 8.46% in 2001, to 14.99% in 2021. The number of individuals who chose not to state their religion fell from 8.66% in 2001, to 7.00% in 2021.

Hindus were 4.07% of the population in 2001, and were 5.15% in 2021. The Jewish community were 2.09% in 2001, and 1.65% in 2021. Sikhs were 1.45% in 2001, and 1.64% in 2021. Other religions, including Buddhism, collectively accounted for small but fluctuating percentages, with Buddhism specifically ranging from 0.76% in 2001, to 0.88% in 2021.

In 1850, there were an estimated 20,000 Jews in London. By 1883 there were around 46,000 Jews in London.

These changes are influenced by factors including immigration, generational attitudes, and broader social trends.

Religious affiliation of Londoners
Religion	1950 estimates		1960 estimates		1975 estimates		1984 estimates		1995 estimates		2001 census		2011 census		2021 census	
Religion	Number	%	Number	%	Number	%	Number	%	Number	%	Number	%	Number	%	Number	%
Christian	–	–	–	–	–	–	–	–	–	–	4,176,175	58.23%	3,957,984	48.42%	3,577,681	40.66%
No religion	–	–	–	–	–	–	–	–	–	–	1,130,616	15.76%	1,694,372	20.73%	2,380,404	27.05%
Muslim	–	–	–	–	–	–	–	–	–	–	607,083	8.46%	1,012,823	12.39%	1,318,754	14.99%
Religion not stated	–	–	–	–	–	–	–	–	–	–	621,366	8.66%	692,739	8.47%	615,662	7.00%
Hindu	–	–	–	–	–	–	–	–	–	–	291,977	4.07%	411,291	5.03%	453,034	5.15%
Jewish	250,000	–	280,000	–	228,000	–	210,000	–	196,000	–	149,789	2.09%	148,602	1.82%	145,466	1.65%
Sikh	–	–	–	–	–	–	–	–	–	–	104,230	1.45%	126,134	1.54%	144,543	1.64%
Other religion	–	–	–	–	–	–	–	–	–	–	36,558	0.51%	47,970	0.59%	86,759	0.99%
Buddhist	–	–	–	–	–	–	–	–	–	–	54,297	0.76%	82,026	1.00%	77,425	0.88%
Total	–	–	–	–	–	–	–	–	–	–	7,172,091	100%	8,173,941	100%	8,799,728	100%

Distribution of religions in Greater London according to the 2011 census.
Christianity

Islam

Hinduism

Judaism

Sikhism

Buddhism

Other religion

No religion

Population pyramid of London by religion in 2021

Population pyramids of each religious group in London

Christian

No religion

None stated

Muslim

Hindu

Buddhist

Sikh

Jewish

Other religion

Ethnicity by religion

Ethnic Group	2021 census					
Ethnic Group	Christian	Muslim	Hindu	Other	No religion	Undeclared
Ethnic Group	Number	Number	Number	Number	Number	Number
White: Total	2,271,066	113,038	1,450	164,195	1,837,754	343,671
White: British	1,426,511	37,544	841	112,911	1,446,794	214,682
White: Irish	109,149	604	60	1,720	35,793	9,007
White: Gypsy or Irish Traveller	4,852	141	16	130	1,445	447
White: Roma	25,646	890	20	455	7,680	2,998
White: Other	704,908	73,859	513	48,979	346,042	116,537
Asian or Asian British: Total	205,801	716,586	421,063	197,465	175,004	101,716
Asian or Asian British: Indian	75,625	66,763	329,329	122,742	31,289	30,524
Asian or Asian British: Pakistani	3,601	264,201	548	582	5,195	16,421
Asian or Asian British: Bangladeshi	1,057	295,963	3,570	442	4,175	16,843
Asian or Asian British: Chinese	26,018	603	162	16,722	89,546	14,469
Asian or Asian British: Other Asian	99,500	89,056	87,454	56,977	44,799	23,459
Black or Black British: Total	775,655	216,758	976	9,382	103,015	82,586
Black or Black British: African	434,796	196,647	375	2,965	25,603	36,667
Black or Black British: Caribbean	241,736	3,875	399	4,851	60,825	33,719
Black or Black British: Other Black	99,123	16,236	202	1,566	16,587	12,200
Mixed or British Mixed: Total	197,939	47,532	3,943	14,004	194,909	47,449
Mixed: White and Black Caribbean	57,671	1,964	75	1,809	59,103	11,933
Mixed: White and Black African	39,137	9,631	98	975	21,121	6,380
Mixed: White and Asian	36,027	12,648	2,648	5,118	56,599	12,148
Mixed: Other Mixed	65,104	23,289	1,122	6,102	58,086	16,988
Other: Total	127,219	224,840	25,602	69,143	69,722	40,241
Other: Arab (Note: New category created for the 2011 census)	6,420	113,809	61	1,174	7,394	10,932
Other: Any other ethnic group	120,799	111,031	25,541	67,969	62,328	29,309
Total	3,577,681	1,318,754	453,034	454,193	2,380,404	615,662

=== Religion by borough ===
Religion in London, 2021 census
Borough	Numbers									Percentages								
Borough	No religion	Christian	Buddhist	Hindu	Jewish	Muslim	Sikh	Other religion	Not answered	No religion	Christian	Buddhist	Hindu	Jewish	Muslim	Sikh	Other religion	Not answered
City of London	3,763	2,976	95	203	177	540	6	55	767	43,8	34,7	1,1	2,4	2,1	6,3	0,1	0,6	8,9
Barking and Dagenham	41,191	99,342	821	6,596	272	53,389	4,284	981	11,991	18,8	45,4	0,4	3,0	0,1	24,4	2,0	0,4	5,5
Barnet	78,684	142,321	4,158	22,105	56,616	47,688	1,524	5,192	31,056	20,2	36,6	1,1	5,7	14,5	12,2	0,4	1,3	8,0
Bexley	82,816	123,908	2,048	7,516	217	9,721	5,272	988	13,986	33,6	50,3	0,8	3,0	0,1	3,9	2,1	0,4	5,7
Brent	46,153	131,914	3,117	52,876	3,723	72,574	1,530	4,424	23,506	13,6	38,8	0,9	15,6	1,1	21,4	0,5	1,3	6,9
Bromley	122,943	159,452	2,100	9,644	966	10,876	1,068	1,704	21,238	37,3	48,3	0,6	2,9	0,3	3,3	0,3	0,5	6,4
Camden	72,776	65,980	2,410	3,991	10,079	33,830	487	1,842	18,743	34,6	31,4	1,1	1,9	4,8	16,1	0,2	0,9	8,9
Croydon	101,119	190,880	2,371	23,145	609	40,717	1,654	3,189	27,035	25,9	48,9	0,6	5,9	0,2	10,4	0,4	0,8	6,9
Ealing	70,233	138,937	4,003	28,236	1,041	68,907	28,491	2,733	24,533	19,1	37,8	1,1	7,7	0,3	18,8	7,8	0,7	6,7
Enfield	65,241	153,015	1,716	10,231	3,713	61,477	1,199	10,351	23,041	19,8	46,4	0,5	3,1	1,1	18,6	0,4	3,1	7,0
Greenwich	94,208	129,112	5,034	11,647	603	24,715	3,229	1,802	18,716	32,6	44,7	1,7	4,0	0,2	8,5	1,1	0,6	6,5
Hackney	94,113	79,499	2,343	1,998	17,426	34,578	1,867	4,879	22,442	36,3	30,7	0,9	0,8	6,7	13,3	0,7	1,9	8,7
Hammersmith and Fulham	56,059	83,673	1,723	2,209	1,228	21,290	450	1,227	15,298	30,6	45,7	0,9	1,2	0,7	11,6	0,2	0,7	8,4
Haringey	83,535	103,944	2,455	3,529	9,397	33,295	892	6,164	21,027	31,6	39,3	0,9	1,3	3,6	12,6	0,3	2,3	8,0
Harrow	27,748	88,602	2,812	67,392	7,304	41,503	2,743	7,695	15,404	10,6	33,9	1,1	25,8	2,8	15,9	1,1	2,9	5,9
Havering	80,235	136,765	1,092	6,454	1,305	16,135	4,498	1,056	14,512	30,6	52,2	0,4	2,5	0,5	6,2	1,7	0,4	5,5
Hillingdon	59,214	119,434	2,621	33,020	1,392	44,077	26,339	2,683	17,129	19,4	39,0	0,9	10,8	0,5	14,4	8,6	0,9	5,6
Hounslow	53,502	110,269	3,932	27,360	622	48,028	24,677	2,323	17,469	18,6	38,3	1,4	9,5	0,2	16,7	8,6	0,8	6,1
Islington	88,466	75,129	1,813	2,195	2,714	25,840	603	2,930	16,902	40,8	34,7	0,8	1,0	1,3	11,9	0,3	1,4	7,8
Kensington and Chelsea	35,610	69,335	1,606	1,584	2,681	16,865	319	1,064	14,311	24,8	48,4	1,1	1,1	1,9	11,8	0,2	0,7	10,0
Kingston upon Thames	57 641	71,670	1,726	8,456	693	13,366	1,428	1,119	11,966	34,3	42,6	1,0	5,0	0,4	8,0	0,8	0,7	7,1
Lambeth	119,123	138,714	2,437	3,179	1,344	25,871	527	2,351	24,110	37,5	43,7	0,8	1,0	0,4	8,1	0,2	0,7	7,6
Lewisham	110,379	131,706	3,270	6,459	826	22,264	720	2,269	22,660	36,7	43,8	1,1	2,1	0,3	7,4	0,2	0,8	7,5
Merton	60,224	101,320	1,899	12,610	754	21,673	614	1,205	14,888	28,0	47,1	0,9	5,9	0,4	10,1	0,3	0,6	6,9
Newham	50,795	123,746	2,160	21,405	448	122,146	5,638	1,765	22,933	14,5	35,3	0,6	6,1	0,1	34,8	1,6	0,5	6,5
Redbridge	38,999	94,473	1,611	34,372	6,412	97,068	17,622	2,028	17,675	12,6	30,4	0,5	11,1	2,1	31,3	5,7	0,7	5,7
Richmond upon Thames	74,076	88,556	1,593	4,184	1,262	8,492	1,987	1,273	13,855	37,9	45,3	0,8	2,1	0,6	4,3	1,0	0,7	7,1
Southwark	111,935	133,298	2,965	3,444	1,243	29,633	632	2,149	22,338	36,4	43,3	1,0	1,1	0,4	9,6	0,2	0,7	7,3
Sutton	67,769	95,960	1,822	14,666	407	14,736	447	1,244	12,589	32,3	45,8	0,9	7,0	0,2	7,0	0,2	0,6	6,0
Tower Hamlets	82,635	69,223	2,961	6,298	1,341	123,912	966	1,652	21,318	26,6	22,3	1,0	2,0	0,4	39,9	0,3	0,5	6,9
Waltham Forest	77,739	108,630	1,834	5,155	1,268	60,157	1,285	2,810	19,548	27,9	39,0	0,7	1,9	0,5	21,6	0,5	1,0	7,0
Wandsworth	118,543	139,656	2,275	6,419	1,756	32,519	967	1,871	23,500	36,2	42,6	0,7	2,0	0,5	9,9	0,3	0,6	7,2
Westminster	52,936	76,245	2,603	4,457	5,628	40,873	573	1,741	19,179	25,9	37,3	1,3	2,2	2,8	20,0	0,3	0,9	9,4

== Social issues ==
=== Marriage and divorce ===
In 2019, 29,139 marriages occurred within London.

=== Abortion ===
In 2020, 27.7% of conceptions were aborted in London.

Abortion in London

The percentage of conceptions aborted in London by each borough in 2020

Abortion rates by age group in London

=== Sexual orientation and gender identity ===
Sexual orientation	London (aged 16 and over)	
Sexual orientation	2021	
Sexual orientation	Number	%
Straight or Heterosexual	6,123,195	86.2%
Gay or Lesbian	158,760	2.2%
Bisexual	108,140	1.5%
All other sexual orientations	37,482	0.5%
Not answered	676,408	9.5%
Total	7,103,985	100%

Gender identity	London (aged 16 and over) 2021	
Gender identity	Number	%
Gender identity the same as sex registered at birth	6,479,664	91.2%
Gender identity different from sex registered at birth but no specific identity given	32,753	0.5%
Trans woman	11,266	0.2%
Trans man	11,480	0.2%
All other gender identities	8,862	0.1%
Not answered	559,960	7.9%
Total	7,103,985	100%

== Health ==
In 2021, the suicide rate in total was 6.6 for every 100,000 people. For males it was 9.9 and for females it was 3.4.

Variety of health issues in graphs

Suicide rates in London

Drug misuse rate in London

Percentage of Year 6s obese in 2020 in London

Percentage of Reception age children obese in 2020

=== General health ===
General health (self-identified)	2001		2011		2021	
General health (self-identified)	Number	%	Number	%	Number	%
Very good health	5,078,978	70.8%	4,127,788	50.5%	4,712,358	53.6%
Good health	5,078,978	70.8%	2,725,645	33.3%	2,802,395	31.8%
Fair health	1,499,198	20.9%	915,035	11.2%	908,941	10.3%
Bad health	593,915	8.3%	305,343	3.7%	283,864	3.2%
Very bad health	593,915	8.3%	100,130	1.2%	92,170	1.0%
Total	7,172,091	100%	8,173,941	100%	8,799,728	100%

==== Disability ====
Disability status	1991 (long term illness)		2001 (limiting long term illness)		2011		2021	
Disability status	Number	%	Number	%	Number	%	Number	%
Disabled (under the Equality Act)	742,870	10.7%	1,111,284	15.5%	1,157,165	14.1%	1,164,456	13.2%
Disabled under the Equality Act: Day-to-day activities limited a little	–	–	–	–	605,501	7.4%	658,547	7.5%
Disabled under the Equality Act: Day-to-day activities limited a lot	–	–	–	–	551,664	6.7%	505,909	5.7%
Not disabled (under the Equality Act)	–	–	–	–	7,016,776	85.8%	7,635,272	86.8%
Not disabled under the Equality Act: No long term physical or mental health conditions	–	–	–	–	7,016,776	85.8%	7,175,718	81.5%
Not disabled under the Equality Act: Has long term physical or mental health condition but day-to-day activities are not limited	–	–	–	–	–	–	459,554	5.2%
Total	6,887,280	100%	7,172,091	100%	8,173,941	100%	8,799,728	100%

== Income and industry ==
In 2022, the vast majority of people within London worked in the service sector.

Income and industry of London in images

Employment rate in London

Unemployment rate in London

Gross Disposable Household Income (GDHI) across London in 2020

Employment in public or private sector in London

=== Industry ===
London's employment sectors over time

Industry sector	London (aged 16 and over in employment)											
Industry sector	1961 (10% sample)		1981 (10% sample)		1991 (10% sample)		2001		2011		2021	
Industry sector	Number	%	Number	%	Number	%	Number	%	Number	%	Number	%
A: Agriculture, Forestry and fishing	772	0.2%	445	–	613	–	11,033	0.3%	2,363	0.1%	2,827	0.1%
B: Mining and quarrying	296	–	–	–	2,961	1%	4,487	0.1%	5,606	0.1%	4,957	0.1%
C: Manufacturing	156,035 (Production)	41.5%	58,649	19.1%	29,889	10.5%	253,358	7.6%	128,905	3.2%	131,674	3.0%
D: Electricity, gas, steam and air conditioning supply	156,035 (Production)	41.5%	5,181	1.7%	3,195	1.1%	11,035	0.3%	10,358	0.3%	15,040	0.3%
E: Water supply; Sewerage, Waste management and Remediation activities	156,035 (Production)	41.5%	5,181	1.7%	3,195	1.1%	11,035	0.3%	14,207	0.4%	12,732	0.3%
F: Construction	156,035 (Production)	41.5%	20,347	6.6%	18,395	6.5%	174,731	5.3%	262,356	6.6%	340,992	7.8%
G: Wholesale and retail trade; repair of motor vehicles and motorcycles	–	–	–	–	–	–	478,374	14.4%	522,204	13.1%	531,842	12.2%
H: Transport and storage	–	–	29,760	9.7%	25,056	8.9%	270,358	8.1%	200,336		205,733	4.7%
J: Information and communication	–	–	–	–	–	–	270,358	8.1%	276,355	6.9%	332,394	7.6%
I: Accommodation and food service activities (Distribution or catering; 1981 + 1991)	213,766 (Services)	56.9%	58,778	19.2%	54,123	19.1%	153,357	4.6%	251,574		237,887	5.5%
K: Financial and insurance activities	213,766 (Services)	56.9%	–	–	57,672	20.4%	937,377	28.3%	306,443		288,113	6.6%
L: Real estate activities	213,766 (Services)	56.9%	–	–	57,672	20.4%	937,377	28.3%	79,520		92,403	2.1%
M: Professional, scientific and technical activities	213,766 (Services)	56.9%	–	–	57,672	20.4%	937,377	28.3%	434,405		456,965	10.5%
N: Administrative and support service activities	213,766 (Services)	56.9%	–	–	57,672	20.4%	937,377	28.3%	234,191		262,952	6.0%
P: Education	213,766 (Services)	56.9%	–	–	–	–	247,767	7.5%	384,156		418,765	9.6%
Q: Human health and social work activities	213,766 (Services)	56.9%	–	–	–	–	334,783	10.1%	428,586		563,238	12.9%
O: Public administration and defence; compulsory social security	4,795	1.3%	–	–	–	–	178,261	5.4%	201,545		209,607	4.8%
R, S, T, U: Other and not stated	–	–	131,194	42.6%	90,740	32.1%	264,213	8.0%	255,787		251,958	5.8%
Total	375,664	100%	307,857	100%	282,644	100%	3,319,134	100%	3,998,897	100%	4,360,079	100%

==== Method of transportation to work ====
Method of transportation	London (aged 16 and over in employment)									
Method of transportation	1981 (10% sample)		1991 (10% sample)		2001		2011		2021	
Method of transportation	Number	%	Number	%	Number	%	Number	%	Number	%
Work mainly at or from home	9,593	3.1%	12,433	4.4%	285,935	7.5%	202,679	5.1%	1,836,823	42.1%
Underground, metro, light rail, tram	39,035	12.7%	–	–	642,476	16.9%	902,263	22.6%	431,842	9.9%
Train	32,638	10.6%	74,262	26.3%	661,166	17.4%	532,720	13.3%	231,074	5.3%
Bus, minibus or coach	51,409	16.7%	32,131	11.4%	376,926	9.9%	561,605	14.0%	386,068	8.9%
Taxi	–	–	–	–	21,962	0.6%	20,314	0.5%	22,544	0.5%
Motorcycle, scooter or moped	6,481	2.1%	3,239	1.1%	55,752	1.5%	45,976	1.1%	30,404	0.7%
Driving a car or van	90,522	29.4%	108,546	38.4%	1,294,081	34.0%	1,120,826	28.0%	897,111	20.6%
Passenger in a car or van	22,903	7.4%	10,068	3.6%	92,819	2.4%	69,659	1.7%	63,883	1.5%
Bicycle	7,308	2.4%	5,783	2.0%	78,804	2.1%	161,705	4.0%	128,833	3.0%
On foot	40,563	13.2%	27,523	9.7%	281,338	7.4%	352,612	8.8%	279,453	6.4%
Other method of travel to work (or Not stated)	7,405	2.4%	8,659	3.1%	14,396	0.4%	28,538	0.7%	52,040	1.2%
Total	307,857	100%	282,644	100%	3,805,655	100%	3,998,897	100%	4,360,075	100%

Note: The proportion of people working from home in 2021 was distorted by the rules surrounding the COVID-19 pandemic.

==== Hours worked weekly ====
Hours worked weekly	London (aged 16 and over in employment)							
Hours worked weekly	1991 (10% sample)		2001		2011		2021	
Hours worked weekly	Number	%	Number	%	Number	%	Number	%
Full-time	224,494	79.4%	2,651,793	79.9%	2,973,844	74.4%	3,137,424	72%
Full-time: 31 to 48 hours worked	224,494	79.4%	2,063,598	62.2%	2,338,716	58.4%	2,555,494	58.6%
Full-time: 49 or more hours worked	224,494	79.4%	588,195	17.7%	635,128	15.9%	581,930	13.3%
Part-time	46,319	16.4%	667,341	20.1%	1,025,053	25.6%	1,222,653	28%
Part-time: 15 hours or less worked	15,812	5.6%	224,349	6.8%	346,106	8.7%	464,497	10.7%
Part-time: 16 to 30 hours worked	30,507	10.8%	442,992	13.3%	678,947	17%	758,156	17.3%
Not stated	11,831	4.1%	–	–	–	–	–	–
Total	282,644	100%	3,319,134	100%	3,998,897	100%	4,360,077	100%

==== Distance to travel to work ====
Distance to travel to work	2001		2011		2021	
Distance to travel to work	Number	%	Number	%	Number	%
Less than 2 km	475,102	14.3%	474,585	11.9%	331,191	7.6%
2 km to less than 5 km	659,230	19.9%	715,936	17.9%	484,894	11.1%
5 km to less than 10 km	803,143	24.2%	926,646	23.2%	533,671	12.2%
10 km to less than 20 km	686,960	20.7%	795,833	19.9%	409,530	9.4%
20 km to less than 30 km	128,560	3.9%	154,589	3.9%	79,897	1.8%
30 km to less than 40 km	32,812	1.0%	38,310	1.0%	23,145	0.5%
40 km to less than 60 km	25,001	0.8%	28,294	0.7%	15,808	0.4%
60 km and over	36,282	1.1%	52,083	1.3%	29,917	0.7%
Works mainly from home	285,935	8.6%	380,665	9.5%	1,836,823	42.1%
Works mainly at an offshore installation, in no fixed place, or outside the UK	186,109	5.6%	–	–	615,201	14.1%
Other	–	–	431,956	10.8%	–	–
Total	3,319,134	100%	3,998,897	100%	4,360,077	100%

Note: The proportion of people working from home in 2021 was distorted by the rules surrounding the COVID-19 pandemic.

== National identity ==
National identity makeup of London by single year ages in 2021

National identity	2011		2021	
National identity	Number	%	Number	%
British only	2,526,808	30.9%	5,011,396	56.9%
English only	3,035,090	37.1%	717,894	8.2%
Welsh only	31,952	0.4%	19,167	0.2%
Scottish only	53,531	0.7%	29,943	0.3%
Northern Irish only	19,943	0.2%	13,917	0.2%
Any combination of UK only identities	–	–	14,484	0.2%
English and British only	444,115	5.4%	594,149	6.8%
Welsh and British only	7,081	0.1%	10,161	0.1%
Scottish and British only	11,344	0.1%	15,665	0.2%
Northern Irish and British only	2,530	0.0%	4,504	0.1%
Irish only	125,733	1.5%	99,780	1.1%
Irish and at least one UK identity	7,169	0.1%	16,941	0.2%
Other identity only	1,830,912	22.4%	1,878,830	21.4%
Other identity and at least one UK identity	191,771	2.3%	372,898	4.2%
Total	8,173,941	100%	8,799,729	100%

Note: The order of options for the census question on national identity was changed between 2011 and 2021. In 2011 "English only" was the first group listed whereas in 2021 "British only" was first instead.

Population pyramids of identity groupings in 2021

English only identity

English and British identity

British only identity

UK and non-UK identity

Non-UK only identity

== Housing ==
Tenure in London according to the 2021 census

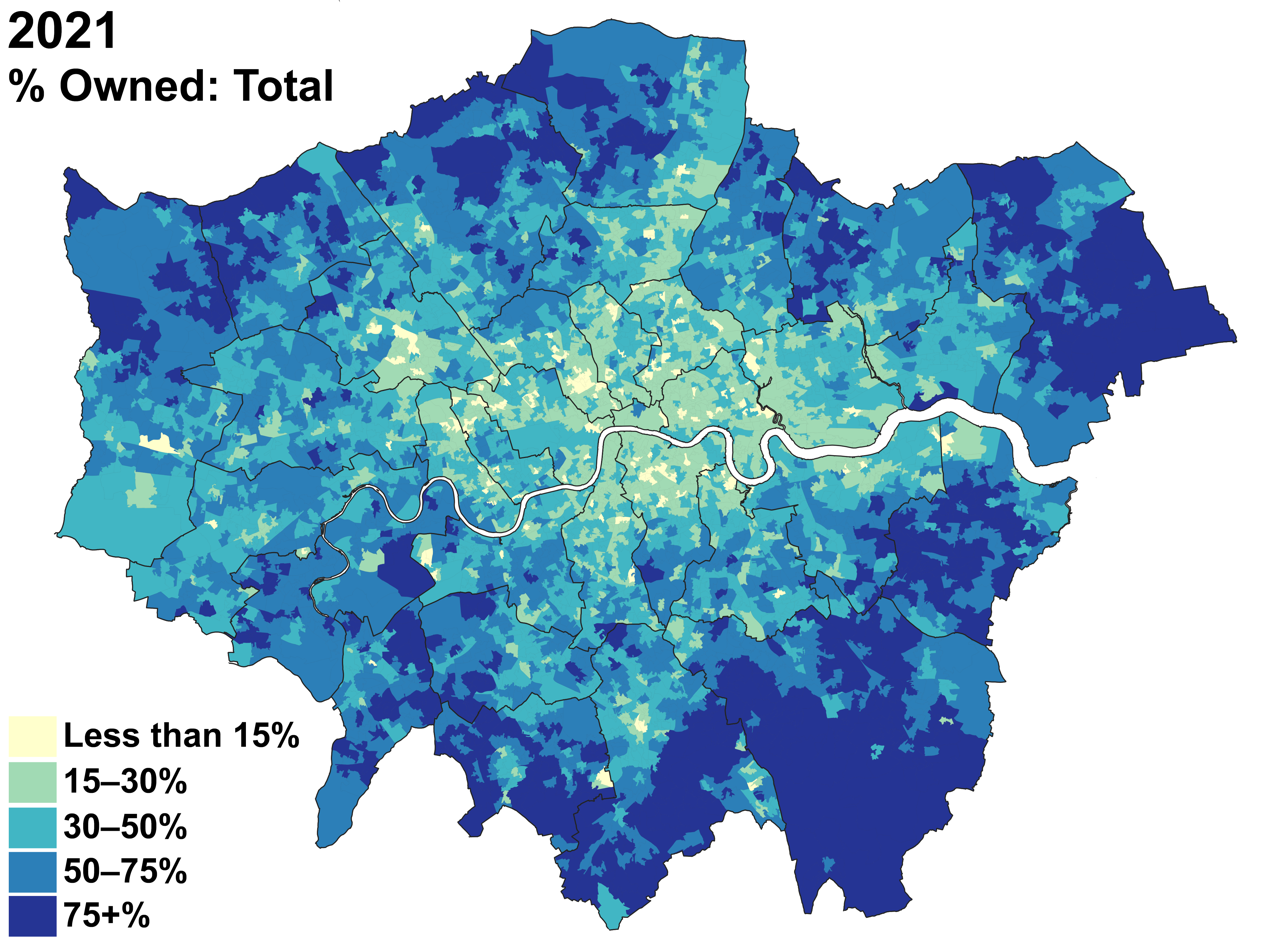
Owned household: Total (46.8%)

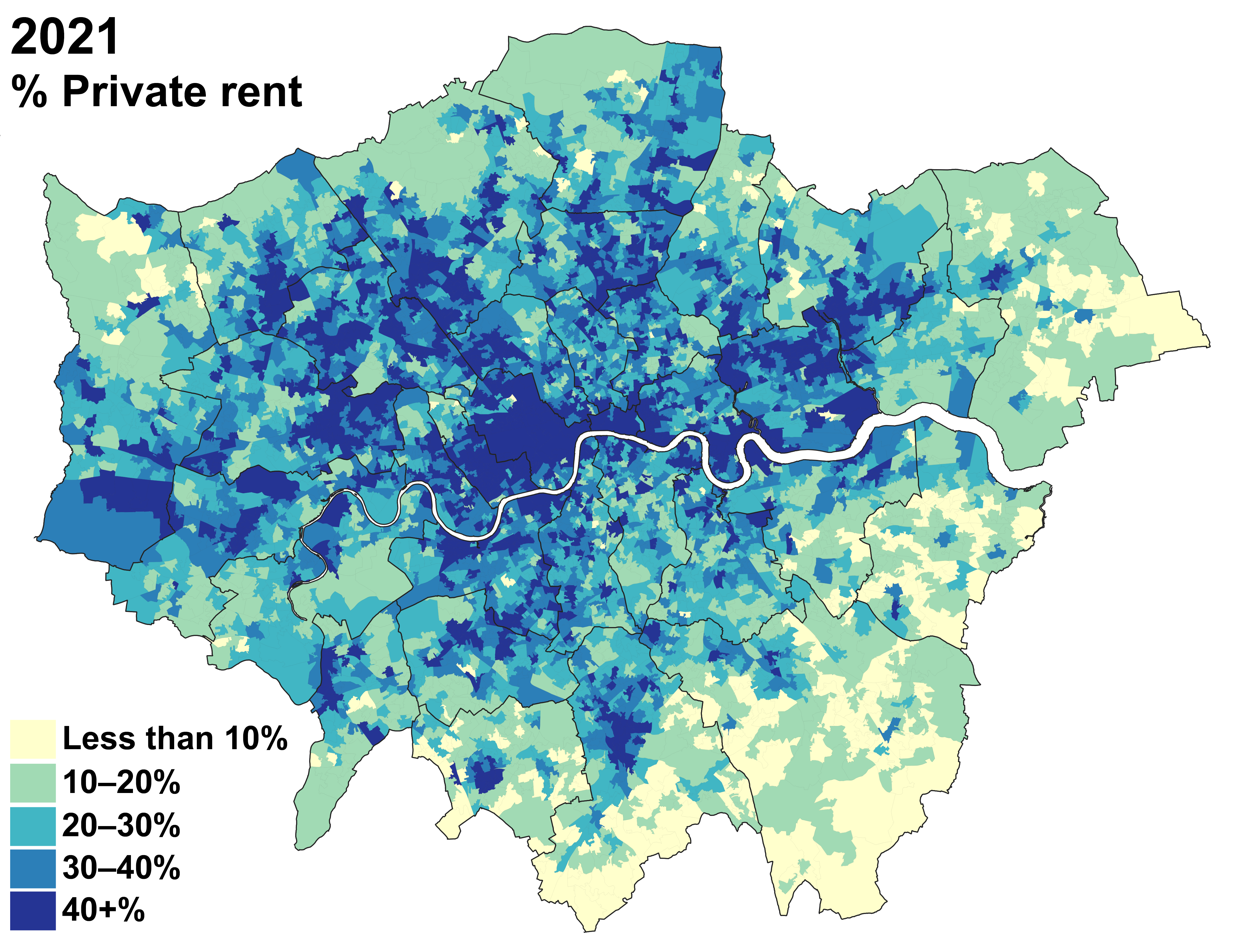
Privately rented (30%)

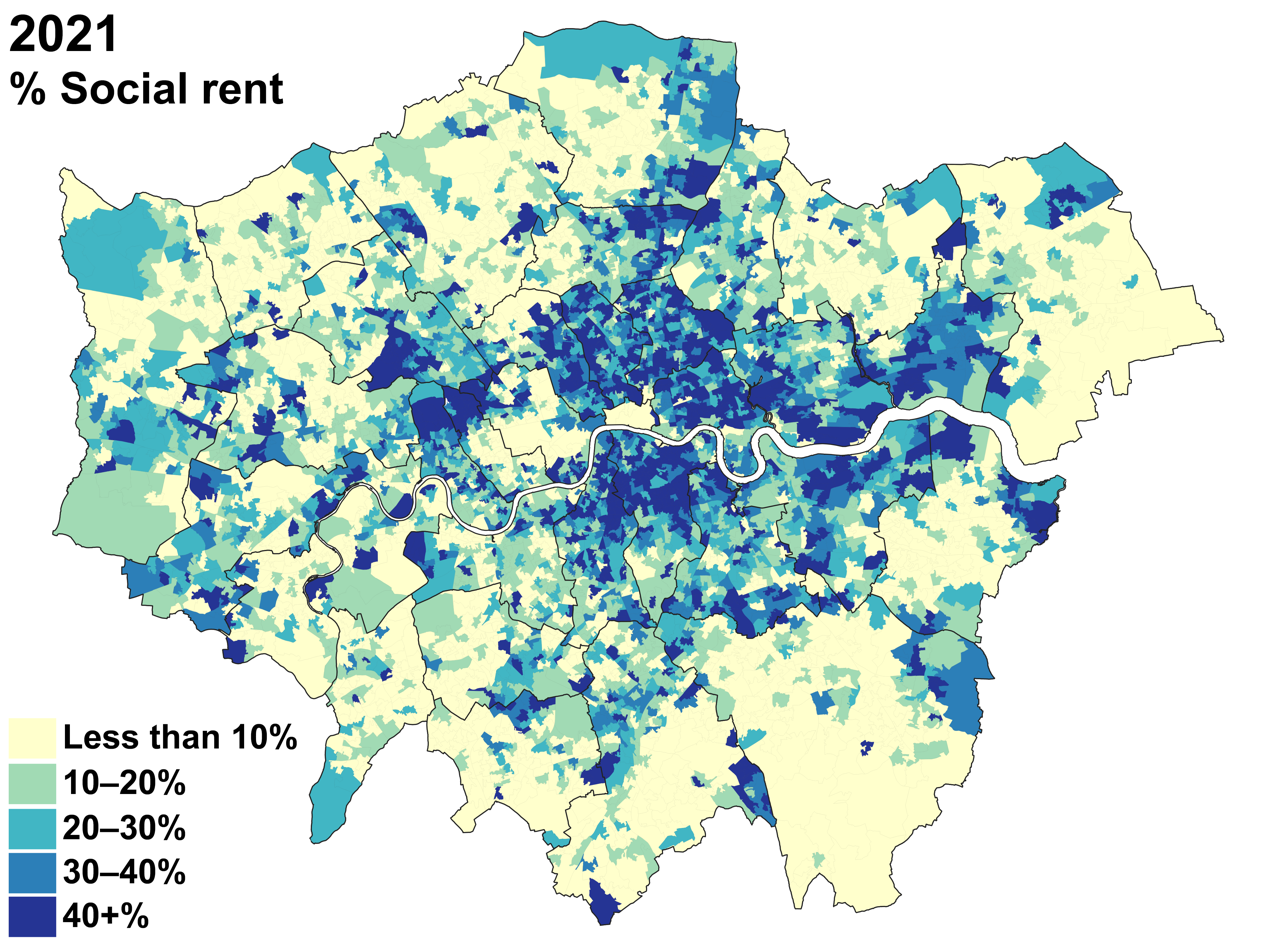
Socially rented (23.1%)

Analysis of tenure by numbers of households
Tenure	1961 census		1981 census		1991 census		2001 census		2011 census		2021 census	
Tenure	No.	%	No.	%	No.	%	No.	%	No.	%	No.	%
Owned	964,934	36.3%	1,217,525	48.6%	1,579,177	57.2%	1,704,719	56.5%	1,618,315	49.5%	1,601,042	46.8%
Owned: outright	–	–	–	–	491,232		665,061		689,898		710,052	
Owned: with a mortgage or loan	–	–	–	–	1,087,945		1,010,629		886,309		838,494	
Shared ownership	–	–	–	–	–	–	29,029		42,108		52,496	
Privately renting	1,146,807	42.4%	415,247	16.6%	382,785		520,907		819,085		1,025,533	30.0%
Held due to employment	61,433		–	–	–	–	–	–	–	–	–	–
Lives rent free	–	–	–	–	–	–	–	–	42,780		6,356	
Social renting	484,992	18.2%	872,449	34.8%	799,167	28.9%	790,371	26.2%	785,993	24.1%	790,958	23.1%
Total	2,658,166	100%	2,505,221	100%	2,761,129	100%	3,015,997	100%	3,266,173	100%	3,423,889	100%

=== Tenure by country of birth ===
2021 census tenure by country of birth
Country of birth	Owned		Privately renting		Social renting	
Country of birth	Households	%	Households	%	Households	%
Europe: United Kingdom: England	956,436	57.1%	317,375	19.0%	400,222	23.9%
Europe: United Kingdom: Northern Ireland	9,249	55.5%	4,482	26.9%	2,927	17.6%
Europe: United Kingdom: Scotland	25,465	57.4%	10,838	24.4%	8,081	18.2%
Europe: United Kingdom: Wales	16,209	64.2%	6,165	24.4%	2,874	11.4%
Europe: United Kingdom: Great Britain not otherwise specified	21	33.3%	15	23.8%	27	42.9%
Europe: United Kingdom: United Kingdom not otherwise specified	97	37.7%	85	33.1%	75	29.2%
Europe: Other Europe: EU countries: Member countries in March 2001: Ireland	30,748	52.1%	12,380	21.0%	15,879	26.9%
Europe: Other Europe: EU countries: Member countries in March 2001: France	13,083	37.2%	19,451	55.3%	2,621	7.5%
Europe: Other Europe: EU countries: Member countries in March 2001: Germany	11,157	46.8%	10,417	43.6%	2,291	9.6%
Europe: Other Europe: EU countries: Member countries in March 2001: Italy	19,356	36.6%	29,912	56.6%	3,566	6.7%
Europe: Other Europe: EU countries: Member countries in March 2001: Portugal (including Madeira and the Azores)	5,282	21.7%	12,587	51.7%	6,482	26.6%
Europe: Other Europe: EU countries: Member countries in March 2001: Spain (including Canary Islands)	7,483	29.7%	15,014	59.6%	2,675	10.6%
Europe: Other Europe: EU countries: Member countries in March 2001: Other member countries in March 2001	15,637	37.2%	23,300	55.5%	3,071	7.3%
Europe: Other Europe: EU countries: Countries that joined the EU between April 2001 and March 2011: Lithuania	4,516	23.5%	12,316	64.0%	2,416	12.6%
Europe: Other Europe: EU countries: Countries that joined the EU between April 2001 and March 2011: Poland	16,179	24.7%	41,925	63.9%	7,475	11.4%
Europe: Other Europe: EU countries: Countries that joined the EU between April 2001 and March 2011: Romania	7,524	13.2%	47,171	82.7%	2,351	4.1%
Europe: Other Europe: EU countries: Countries that joined the EU between April 2001 and March 2011: Other EU countries	24,334	32.9%	40,668	55.0%	8,873	12.0%
Europe: Other Europe: EU countries: Countries that joined the EU between April 2011 and March 2021: Croatia	982	37.2%	1,124	42.5%	536	20.3%
Europe: Other Europe: Rest of Europe: Turkey	8,867	24.6%	13,905	38.5%	13,346	37.0%
Europe: Other Europe: Rest of Europe: Other Europe	22,162	30.0%	38,609	52.2%	13,142	17.8%
Africa: North Africa	8,080	22.6%	12,762	35.7%	14,880	41.7%
Africa: Central and Western Africa: Ghana	9,366	25.0%	9,814	26.2%	18,269	48.8%
Africa: Central and Western Africa: Nigeria	18,150	28.4%	19,731	30.9%	25,992	40.7%
Africa: Central and Western Africa: Other Central and Western Africa	4,846	11.2%	12,535	29.1%	25,696	59.7%
Africa: South and Eastern Africa: Kenya	22,667	75.4%	3,564	11.9%	3,833	12.7%
Africa: South and Eastern Africa: Somalia	968	2.7%	8,367	23.4%	26,371	73.9%
Africa: South and Eastern Africa: South Africa	12,381	48.9%	11,002	43.5%	1,934	7.6%
Africa: South and Eastern Africa: Zimbabwe	3,405	36.6%	3,246	34.9%	2,645	28.5%
Africa: South and Eastern Africa: Other South and Eastern Africa	27,493	42.5%	11,893	18.4%	25,251	39.1%
Africa: Africa not otherwise specified	511	48.3%	166	15.7%	381	36.0%
Middle East and Asia: Middle East: Iran	8,742	34.7%	10,823	43.0%	5,626	22.3%
Middle East and Asia: Middle East: Iraq	4,575	27.8%	6,617	40.2%	5,261	32.0%
Middle East and Asia: Middle East: Other Middle East	9,968	30.9%	16,483	51.0%	5,840	18.1%
Middle East and Asia: Eastern Asia: China	12,700	50.3%	10,363	41.1%	2,170	8.6%
Middle East and Asia: Eastern Asia: Hong Kong (Special Administrative Region of China)	9,597	61.6%	4,802	30.8%	1,184	7.6%
Middle East and Asia: Eastern Asia: Other Eastern Asia	6,051	38.7%	8,634	55.3%	932	6.0%
Middle East and Asia: Southern Asia: Afghanistan	3,321	17.4%	9,042	47.4%	6,726	35.2%
Middle East and Asia: Southern Asia: India	74,556	57.0%	47,241	36.1%	8,964	6.9%
Middle East and Asia: Southern Asia: Pakistan	23,156	43.3%	20,625	38.5%	9,726	18.2%
Middle East and Asia: Southern Asia: Bangladesh	15,991	26.1%	18,171	29.6%	27,194	44.3%
Middle East and Asia: Southern Asia: Sri Lanka	18,435	49.3%	13,811	37.0%	5,125	13.7%
Middle East and Asia: Southern Asia: Other Southern Asia	3,493	48.4%	3,154	43.7%	577	8.0%
Middle East and Asia: South-East Asia: Philippines	7,381	31.8%	10,239	44.1%	5,581	24.1%
Middle East and Asia: South-East Asia: Malaysia	6,654	64.8%	2,768	26.9%	851	8.3%
Middle East and Asia: South-East Asia: Singapore	2,942	59.5%	1,682	34.0%	320	6.5%
Middle East and Asia: South-East Asia: Other South-East Asia	6,848	38.6%	4,961	28.0%	5,937	33.5%
Middle East and Asia: Central Asia	818	31.0%	1,500	56.8%	321	12.2%
The Americas and the Caribbean: North America: United States	12,397	41.1%	16,279	54.0%	1,464	4.9%
The Americas and the Caribbean: North America: Canada	5,223	47.3%	5,296	48.0%	522	4.7%
The Americas and the Caribbean: North America: Other North America	172	32.8%	309	58.9%	44	8.4%
The Americas and the Caribbean: Central America: All Central American countries	1,051	30.1%	2,145	61.5%	294	8.4%
The Americas and the Caribbean: South America: All South American countries	15,468	23.7%	37,044	56.8%	12,693	19.5%
The Americas and the Caribbean: The Caribbean: Jamaica	18,376	36.0%	7,625	14.9%	25,010	49.0%
The Americas and the Caribbean: The Caribbean: Other Caribbean	13,724	42.4%	5,723	17.7%	12,895	39.9%
Antarctica and Oceania: Australasia: Australia	10,400	46.7%	11,061	49.7%	798	3.6%
Antarctica and Oceania: Australasia: New Zealand	5,641	53.6%	4,364	41.4%	525	5.0%
Antarctica and Oceania: Australasia: Other Australasia	5	45.5%	5	45.5%	1	9.1%
Antarctica and Oceania: Other Oceania and Antarctica	695	58.4%	305	25.6%	190	16.0%
Other	7	58.3%	1	8.3%	4	33.3%

== Education ==
=== Level of qualification ===
Level of qualification	London (aged 16 and over, not in education)					
Level of qualification	2001		2011		2021	
Level of qualification	Number	%	Number	%	Number	%
No qualifications	1,257,929	23.7%	1,152,517	17.6%	1,151,250	16.2%
Level 1 and entry level qualifications	689,228	13.0%	702,687	10.7%	545,269	7.7%
Level 2 qualifications	904,205	17.1%	775,928	11.8%	707,518	10.0%
Apprenticeship	–	–	107,665	1.6%	227,622	3.2%
Level 3 qualifications	518,624	9.8%	685,508	10.5%	937,875	13.2%
Level 4 qualifications or above	1,642,467	31.0%	2,470,225	37.7%	3,316,829	46.7%
Other qualifications	287,879	5.4%	654,643	10.0%	217,622	3.1%
Total	5,300,332	100%	6,549,173	100%	7,103,985	100%

== See also ==
- Demographics of the United Kingdom
- Demographics of England
- Demographics of Birmingham
- Demographics of Greater Manchester
- Religion in London
- Religion in England
- List of English cities by population
- List of English districts by population
- List of English districts and their ethnic composition
- List of English districts by area
- List of English districts by population density
