= Demographics of Nottingham =

- Population pyramid of Nottingham
- Population: 305,680 (2011)

Population density in the 2011 census in Nottingham.

Nottingham, England is an ethnically and culturally diverse city. It is the sixteenth most populous city in the United Kingdom.

Simplified Industry sectors over time in Nottingham

== Population ==
Nottingham's total population, according to the 2011 UK census, was 305,680. The population density was 4,073 people per square km.

== Ethnicity ==
Ethnic demography of Nottingham over time

Ethnic makeup of Nottingham by single year ages in 2021

The following table shows the ethnic group of respondents in the 1991, 2001, 2011, and 2021 censuses in Nottingham. Nottingham is a majority White city with a majority of 65.8%, the largest ethnicity of which is the White British at 57.3%. However, this majority has been in decline since post-war migration began to the UK. Asian British residents have risen from 5.1% in 1991 to 14.9% in 2021. Black British residents have also risen with the majority of growth coming from Black Africans, going from 4.6% in 1991 to 10.0% in 2021. Mixed and Other ethnicities have also risen as a percentage of the population, although the Mixed proportion fell slightly between 2011 and 2021.

A Home Office report officially estimated that the non white population of Nottingham in 1958 was likely around 4,000 to 5,000, the overwhelming majority being Afro-Caribbean (3,000), and a number of Pakistanis (700). In 1966, West Indians comprised around roughly 1.6% of Nottingham.

Ethnic Group	1971 estimations		1981 estimations		1991 census		2001 census		2011 census		2021 census	
Ethnic Group	Number	%	Number	%	Number	%	Number	%	Number	%	Number	%
White: Total	280,830	94.9%	251,841	92.1%	250,155	89.1%	226,710	84.91%	218,698	71.54%	213,430	65.8%
White: British	–	–	–	–	–	–	216,401	81.05%	199,990	65.42%	185,580	57.3%
White: Irish	–	–	–	–	–	–	3,629	1.36%	2,819	0.92%	2,360	0.7%
White: Gypsy or Irish Traveller (Note: New category created for the 2011 census)	–	–	–	–	–	–	–	–	326	0.11%	269	0.1%
White: Roma	–	–	–	–	–	–	–	–	–	–	1,130	0.3%
White: Other	–	–	–	–	–	–	6,680	2.50%	15,563	5.09%	24,091	7.4%
Asian or Asian British: Total	–	–	9,593	3.5%	14,659	5.2%	19,070	7.14%	40,039	13.10%	48,217	14.9%
Asian or Asian British: Indian	–	–	3,673		5,170		6,096	2.28%	9,901	3.24%	11,515	3.6%
Asian or Asian British: Pakistani	–	–	4,761		7,491		9,725	3.64%	16,771	5.49%	21,684	6.7%
Asian or Asian British: Bangladeshi	–	–	194		327		533	0.20%	1,049	0.34%	2,223	0.7%
Asian or Asian British: Chinese (Note: In 2001, listed under the 'Chinese or other ethnic group' heading.)	–	–	522		919		1,715	0.64%	5,988	1.96%	4,263	1.3%
Asian or Asian British: Other Asian	–	–	443		752		1,001	0.37%	6,330	2.07%	8,532	2.6%
Black or Black British: Total	–	–	9,896	3.6%	13,249	4.7%	11,582	4.34%	22,185	7.26%	32,215	10%
Black or Black British: African	–	–	494		669		1,281	0.48%	9,877	3.23%	18,740	5.8%
Black or Black British: Caribbean	–	–	7,037		9,244		9,189	3.44%	9,382	3.07%	9,339	2.9%
Black or Black British: Other Black	–	–	2,365		3,336		1,112	0.42%	2,926	0.96%	4,136	1.3%
Mixed: Total	–	–	–	–	–	–	8,370	3.13%	20,265	6.63%	19,063	5.9%
Mixed: White and Black Caribbean	–	–	–	–	–	–	5,297	1.98%	12,166	3.98%	10,129	3.1%
Mixed: White and Black African	–	–	–	–	–	–	540	0.20%	2,004	0.66%	2,129	0.7%
Mixed: White and Asian	–	–	–	–	–	–	1,254	0.47%	3,304	1.08%	3,363	1.0%
Mixed: Other Mixed	–	–	–	–	–	–	1,279	0.48%	2,791	0.91%	3,442	1.1%
Other: Total	–	–	1944		2836		1,256	0.47%	4,493	1.47%	10,710	3.3%
Other: Arab (Note: New category created for the 2011 census)	–	–	–	–	–	–	–	–	2,372	0.78%	3,673	1.1%
Other: Any other ethnic group	–	–	–	–	–	–	1,256	0.47%	2,121	0.69%	7,037	2.2%
Non-White: Total	15,017	5.1%	21,433	7.8%	30,744	10.9%	40,278	15.1%	86,982	28.5	110,205	34.2%
Total	295,847	100%	273,274	100%	280,899	100%	266,988	100%	305,680	100%	323,635	100%

Notes for table above

Distribution of ethnic groups in Nottingham according to the 2011 census.
White

White-British

White-Irish

White-Other

Asian

Asian-Indian

Asian-Pakistani

Asian-Bangladeshi

Asian-Chinese

Black

Black-African

Black-Caribbean

Other-Arab

=== Ethnicity of school pupils ===
Ethnic group	School year	
Ethnic group	2021/2022	
Ethnic group	Number	%
White: Total	23,758	49.1%
White: British	19,730	40.7%
White: Irish	89	
White: Traveller of Irish heritage	40	
White: Gypsy/Roma	348	
White: Other	3,551	
Asian / Asian British: Total	9,175	19%
Asian / Asian British: Indian	1,408	
Asian / Asian British: Pakistani	5,509	
Asian / Asian British: Bangladeshi	364	
Asian / Asian British: Chinese	334	
Asian / Asian British: Other Asians	1,560	
Black / Black British: Total	5,974	12.3%
Black: Caribbean	1,078	
Black: African	3,982	
Black: Other Blacks	914	
Mixed / British Mixed	6,678	13.8%
Other: Total	1,812	3.7%
Unclassified	1,034	2.1%
Total:	48,431	100%

== Languages ==
The most common main languages spoken in Nottingham according to the 2011 census are shown below.

Rank	Language	Usual residents aged 3+	Proportion
1	English	256,411	87.40%
2	Polish	6,548	2.23%
3	Urdu	4,089	1.39%
4	Punjabi	2,453	0.84%
5	Arabic	2,372	0.78%
6	Persian	915	0.31%
7	Kurdish	899	0.31%
8	French	858	0.29%
9	Portuguese	820	0.28%
10	Pakistani Pahari (with Mirpuri and Potwari)	694	0.24%
11	Greek	687	0.23%
12	Cantonese Chinese	609	0.21%
13	Spanish	557	0.19%
14	Italian	556	0.19%
15	Turkish	523	0.18%
16	Malay	509	0.17%
17	Bengali (with Sylheti and Chatgaya)	485	0.17%
18	Gujarati	464	0.16%
19	Lithuanian	461	0.16%
20	Hindi	460	0.16%
	Other	12,092	4.12%

== Religion ==
Religious makeup of Nottingham by single year age groups in 2021

The following table shows the religion of respondents in the 2001 and 2011 censuses in Nottingham.

Religion	2001		2011		2021	
Religion	Number	%	Number	%	Number	%
Christian	153,962	57.67	135,216	44.23	112,200	34.7
Buddhist	1,122	0.42	2,051	0.67	1,671	0.5
Hindu	2,225	0.83	4,498	1.47	5,403	1.7
Jewish	627	0.23	1,069	0.35	941	0.3
Muslim	12,353	4.63	26,919	8.81	39,540	12.2
Sikh	3,321	1.24	4,312	1.41	4,110	1.3
Other religion	893	0.33	1,483	0.49	2,263	0.7
No religion	66,312	24.84	106,954	34.99	133,403	41.2
Religion not stated	26,173	9.80	23,178	7.58	24,099	7.4
Total	266,988	100.00%	305,680	100.00%	323,635	100.00%

Distribution of religions in Nottingham according to the 2011 census.
Christianity

Islam

Hinduism

Sikhism

Buddhism

Judaism

Other religion

No religion

== See also ==
- Demographics of the United Kingdom
- Demographics of England
- Demographics of London
- Demographics of Birmingham
- Demographics of Greater Manchester
- List of English cities by population
- List of English districts by population
- List of English districts and their ethnic composition
- List of English districts by area
- List of English districts by population density
