= Demographics of Leeds =

- Population pyramid of Leeds
- Population: 751,485 (2011)
- Density: 1,388 people per square km.

Population density in the 2011 census in the Leeds Metropolitan District Council area.

Leeds, England is the third most populous city in the United Kingdom.

== Population ==
Leeds's total population, according to the 2011 UK census, was 751,485. The population density was 1,388 people per square km.

== Ethnicity ==
Ethnic demography of Leeds over time

Ethnic makeup of Leeds by single year ages in 2021

The following table shows the ethnic group of respondents in the 2001 and 2011 censuses in Leeds.

A Home Office report officially estimated that the 'coloured' population of Leeds in 1958 was likely around 3,000 to 5,000, the majority of these being Afro-Caribbean (2,000).

Ethnic Group	1971 estimations		1981 estimations		1991 census		2001 census		2011 census		2021 census	
Ethnic Group	Number	%	Number	%	Number	%	Number	%	Number	%	Number	%
White: Total	772,062	97.9%	690,047	95.6%	675,019	94.1%	657,082	91.85%	639,487	85.10%	641,801	79%
White: British	–	–	–	–	–	–	637,872	89.16%	609,714	81.13%	595,737	73.4%
White: Irish	–	–	–	–	–	–	8,578	1.20%	7,031	0.94%	6,892	0.8%
White: Gypsy or Irish Traveller (Note: New category created for the 2011 census)	–	–	–	–	–	–	–	–	687	0.09%	878	0.1%
White: Roma	–	–	–	–	–	–	–	–	–	–	1,610	0.2%
White: Other	–	–	–	–	–	–	10,632	1.49%	22,055	2.93%	36,684	4.5%
Asian or Asian British: Total	–	–	18,869	2.6%	26,321	3.7%	35,737	5.00%	58,243	7.75%	78,503	9.7%
Asian or Asian British: Indian	–	–	8,129		10,623		12,303	1.72%	16,130	2.15%	21,087	2.6%
Asian or Asian British: Pakistani	–	–	7,003		9,995		15,064	2.11%	22,492	2.99%	31,405	3.9%
Asian or Asian British: Bangladeshi	–	–	1,149		1,885		2,537	0.35%	4,432	0.59%	5,876	0.7%
Asian or Asian British: Chinese (Note: In 2001, listed under the 'Chinese or other ethnic group' heading.)	–	–	1,529		2,176		3,447	0.48%	5,933	0.79%	8,117	1.0%
Asian or Asian British: Other Asian	–	–	1,059		1,642		2,386	0.33%	9,256	1.23%	12,018	1.5%
Black or Black British: Total	–	–	9,370	1.3%	11,495	1.6%	10,318	1.44%	25,893	3.45%	45,376	5.6%
Black or Black British: African	–	–	1,141		1,392		2,435	0.34%	14,894	1.98%	32,211	4.0%
Black or Black British: Caribbean	–	–	5,751		6,970		6,718	0.94%	6,728	0.90%	7,889	1.0%
Black or Black British: Other Black	–	–	2,478		3,133		1,165	0.16%	4,271	0.57%	5,276	0.6%
Mixed: Total	–	–	–	–	–	–	9,737	1.36%	19,632	2.61%	27,388	3.3%
Mixed: White and Black Caribbean	–	–	–	–	–	–	4,603	0.64%	8,813	1.17%	10,028	1.2%
Mixed: White and Black African	–	–	–	–	–	–	885	0.12%	2,493	0.33%	4,294	0.5%
Mixed: White and Asian	–	–	–	–	–	–	2,516	0.35%	4,906	0.65%	7,410	0.9%
Mixed: Other Mixed	–	–	–	–	–	–	1,733	0.24%	3,420	0.46%	5,656	0.7%
Other: Total	–	–	3,396	0.5%	4,566	0.6%	2,528	0.35%	8,230	1.10%	18,885	2.3%
Other: Arab (Note: New category created for the 2011 census)	–	–	–	–	–	–	–	–	3,791	0.50%	5,980	0.7%
Other: Any other ethnic group	–	–	3,396	0.5%	4,566	0.6%	2,528	0.35%	4,439	0.59%	12,905	1.6%
Non-White: Total	16,938	2.1%	31,638	4.4%	42,381	5.9%	58,320	8.1%	111,998	14.9%	170,152	21%
Total	789,000	100%	721,685	100%	717,400	100%	715,402	100%	751,485	100%	811,953	100%

Notes for table above

Distribution of ethnic groups in the Leeds Metropolitan District Council area according to the 2011 census.
White

White-British

White-Irish

White-Other

Asian

Asian-Indian

Asian-Pakistani

Asian-Bangladeshi

Asian-Chinese

Black

Black-African

Black-Caribbean

Other-Arab

== Languages ==
The most common main languages spoken in Leeds according to the 2011 census are shown below.

Rank	Language	Usual residents aged 3+	Proportion
1	English	670,650	92.90%
2	Polish	6,717	0.93%
3	Urdu	4,989	0.69%
4	Punjabi	4,537	0.63%
5	Arabic	3,393	0.47%
6	Bengali (with Sylheti and Chatgaya)	1,955	0.27%
7	Kurdish	1,772	0.25%
8	French	1,724	0.24%
9	Persian	1,623	0.22%
10	Portuguese	1,260	0.17%
11	Tigrinya	904	0.13%
12	Spanish	851	0.12%
13	Lithuanian	842	0.12%
14	Shona	793	0.11%
15	Gujarati	760	0.11%
16	Russian	737	0.10%
17	Greek	726	0.10%
18	Czech	707	0.10%
19	Hindi	705	0.10%
20	Cantonese Chinese	704	0.10%
	Other	15,522	2.15%

== Religion ==
Religious make up of Leeds by single year age groups in 2021

In 1881, the Jewish population of Leeds was 2,937, making up just under 1% (0.95%). The following table shows the religion of respondents in recent censuses in Leeds.

Religion	2001		2011		2021	
Religion	Number	%	Number	%	Number	%
Christian	492,656	68.86%	419,790	55.86%	343,311	42.28%
Muslim	21,394	2.99%	40,772	5.43%	63,054	7.77%
Sikh	7,586	1.06%	8,914	1.19%	10,047	1.24%
Hindu	4,183	0.58%	7,048	0.94%	9,217	1.14%
Jewish	8,267	1.16%	6,847	0.91%	6,267	0.77%
Buddhist	1,587	0.22%	2,772	0.37%	2,874	0.35%
Other religion	1,530	0.21%	2,396	0.32%	3,637	0.45%
No religion	120,139	16.79%	212,229	28.24%	326,231	40.18%
Religion not stated	58,060	8.12%	50,717	6.75%	47,315	5.83%
Total	715,402	100.00%	751,485	100.00%	811,953	100.00%

Religion in Leeds (2021)
1. Christianity (42.3%)
2. No Religion (40.2%)
3. Islam (7.77%)
4. Sikhism (1.24%)
5. Hinduism (1.14%)
6. Judaism (0.77%)
7. Buddhism (0.35%)
8. Other Religions (0.45%)
9. Religion not Stated (5.83%)
Distribution of religions in the Leeds Metropolitan District Council area according to the 2011 census.
Christianity

Islam

Judaism

Hinduism

Sikhism

Buddhism

Other religion

No religion

== See also ==
- Demographics of West Yorkshire
- Demographics of the United Kingdom
- Demographics of England
- Demographics of London
- Demographics of Birmingham
- Demographics of Greater Manchester
- List of English cities by population
- List of English districts by population
- List of English districts and their ethnic composition
- List of English districts by area
- List of English districts by population density
