= Demographics of Manchester =

Demographic overview of the UK city

- Population pyramid of Manchester
- Population: ▲551,938 (2021)
- Growth rate: ▲9.7% (2011-2021)
- Life expectancy
  - male: ▼75.5 (2018-2020)
  - female: 79.9 (2018-2020)

Nationality
- Major ethnic: ▼ White: 56.8% (2021) ▼ White British: 48.7% (2021)
- Minor ethnic: ▲ Asian British: 20.9% (2021) ▲ Black British: 12% (2021) ▲ Mixed: 5.2% (2021) ▲ Other: 5.1% (2021)

Manchester is a populous city in the North West of England. Its total population as of 2021 is 551,938.

This article focuses on the district, that being the City of Manchester rather than the built-up urban area.

== Population ==
Historically the population of Manchester began to increase rapidly during the Victorian era, estimated at 354,930 for Manchester and 110,833 for Salford in 1865, and peaking at 766,311 in 1931. From then the population began to decrease rapidly, due to slum clearance and the increased building of social housing overspill estates by Manchester City Council after the Second World War such as Hattersley and Langley.

The population of Manchester currently sits at 551,938 as of 2021.

=== Age ===
Population pyramid of Manchester over time

1861

1881

1891

1911

1931

1951

1961

1971

1981

1991

2001

2011

2021

== Country of birth ==
UK and foreign born population pyramid of Manchester in 2021. Males and females representing the UK born population while foreign males and females representing the foreign born population.

Country of birth	Year									
Country of birth	1981		1991		2001		2011		2021	
Country of birth	Number	%	Number	%	Number	%	Number	%	Number	%
United Kingdom	388,622	88.8%	358,399	88.5%	334,771	85.3%	376,066	74.7%	378,730	68.6%
Foreign born	49,040	11.2%	46,462	11.5%	58,048	14.7%	127,061	25.3%	173,208	31.4%
Total	437,662	100%	404,861	100%	392,819	100%	503,127	100%	551,938	100%

== Ethnicity ==
Manchester ethnic demography over time

Population pyramid of Manchester by ethnicity in 2021

Ethnic makeup of Manchester by single year age groups

Manchester is an ethnically diverse city, comprising a vast degree of ethnicities from all over the world. The ethnic makeup of the city during the 21st century has changed, with 81% defining themselves as White and 74.5% White British in 2001, and 56.8% defining themselves as white and 48.7% White British in 2021. Asian British people have risen from around 6.6% of the city in 1991, to a total of 20.9% in 2021, with the majority being of Pakistani ethnicity. Black British people have additionally risen, in conjunction with Mixed ethnicity people and Other ethnic groups category, rising from 4.7% in 1991 to 12%, 3.2% in 2001 to 5.2% and 1.4% in 1991 to 5.1% respectively.

Below shows the estimations of the ethnicity of Manchester for 1971 and 1981, and the census results for Manchester's ethnicity in 1991 to 2021.

Ethnic group	Year													
Ethnic group	1966 estimations		1971 estimations		1981 estimations		1991 census		2001 census		2011 census		2021 census	
Ethnic group	Number	%	Number	%	Number	%	Number	%	Number	%	Number	%	Number	%
White: Total	–	–	512,936	95.8%	413,954	91.3%	382,377	87.2%	318,013	81%	335,109	66.6%	313,632	56.8%
White: British	–	–	–	–	–	–	–	–	292,498	74.5%	298,237	59.3%	268,572	48.7%
White: Irish	–	–	–	–	–	–	–	–	14,826	3.8%	11,843	2.4%	9,442	1.7%
White: Traveller of Irish heritage	–	–	–	–	–	–	–	–	–	–	509	0.1%	597	0.1%
White: Gypsy/Roma	–	–	–	–	–	–	–	–	–	–	–	–	883	0.2%
White: Other	–	–	–	–	–	–	–	–	10,689	2.7%	24,520	4.9%	34,138	6.2%
Asian / Asian British: Total	–	–	–	–	19,263	4.2%	29,223	6.7%	41,003	10.4%	85,986	17.1%	115,109	20.9%
Asian / Asian British: Indian	–	–	–	–	3,489		4,819		5,817		11,417	2.3%	14,857	2.7%
Asian / Asian British: Pakistani	–	–	–	–	10,912		16,999		23,104	5.9%	42,904	8.5%	65,875	11.9%
Asian / Asian British: Bangladeshi	–	–	–	–	1,112		2,214		3,654		6,437	1.3%	9,673	1.8%
Asian / Asian British: Chinese	–	–	–	–	2,419		3,205		5,126		13,539	2.7%	12,644	2.3%
Asian / Asian British: Other Asians	–	–	–	–	1,331		1,986		3,302		11,689	2.3%	12,060	2.2%
Black / Black British: Total	–	–	–	–	15,947	3.5%	20,866	4.8%	17,739	4.5%	43,484	8.6%	65,893	12%
Black: African	–	–	–	–	2,684		3,769		6,655	1.7%	25,718	5.1%	47,858	8.7%
Black: Caribbean	–	–	–	–	9,103		11,473		9,044	2.3%	9,642	1.9%	10,472	1.9%
Black: Other Blacks	–	–	–	–	4,160		5,624		2,040		8,124	1.6%	7,563	1.4%
Mixed / British Mixed	–	–	–	–	–	–	–	–	12,673	3.2%	23,161	4.6%	29,026	5.2%
White and Black Caribbean	–	–	–	–	–	–	–	–	5,295		8,877	1.8%	9,987	1.8%
White and Black African	–	–	–	–	–	–	–	–	2,412		4,397	0.9%	5,992	1.1%
White and Asian	–	–	–	–	–	–	–	–	2,459		4,791	1%	6,149	1.1%
Any other mixed background	–	–	–	–	–	–	–	–	2,507		5,096	1%	6,898	1.2%
Other: Total	–	–	–	–	4,258	0.9%	6,033	1.3%	3,391	0.9%	15,387	3.1%	28,278	5.1%
Other: Arab	–	–	–	–	–	–	–	–	–	–	9,503	1.9%	15,028	2.7%
Other: Any other ethnic group	–	–	–	–	–	–	–	–	3,391	0.9%	5,884	1.2%	13,250	2.4%
Ethnic minority	14,000	–	22,484	4.2%	39,468	8.7%	56,122	12.8%	74,806	19%	168,018	33.4%	238,306	43.2%
Total:	–	100%	535,420	100%	453,422	100%	438,499	100%	392,819	100%	503,127	100%	551,938	100%

Ethnic group	School year							
Ethnic group	1971		1997/1998		2004/2005		2021/2022	
Ethnic group	Number	%	Number	%	Number	%	Number	%
White: Total	–	94%	44,068	76.8%	34,860	64%	34,609	37.6%
White: British	–	–	–	–	33,698		29,591	32.2%
White: Irish	–	–	–	–	373		320	0.3%
White: Traveller of Irish heritage	–	–	–	–	106		87	0.1%
White: Gypsy/Roma	–	–	–	–	23		286	0.3%
White: Other	–	–	–	–	658		4,325	4.7%
Asian / Asian British: Total	–	–	–	–	8,893	16.3%	23,594	25.9%
Asian / Asian British: Indian	–	–	616		770		2,163	2.4%
Asian / Asian British: Pakistani	–	–	5,353		6,204		15,838	17.3%
Asian / Asian British: Bangladeshi	–	–	744		971		2,157	2.4%
Asian / Asian British: Chinese	–	–	441		390		1,073	1.2%
Asian / Asian British: Other Asians	–	–	(Note: Included in ‘Other: Total’ category)		558		2,363	2.6%
Black / Black British: Total	–	–	4,549	7.9%	4,700	8.6%	15,699	17.1%
Black: Caribbean	–	–	2,606		1,517		1,324	1.4%
Black: African	–	–	801		2,618		11,014	12.0%
Black: Other Blacks	–	–	1,142		564		3,361	3.7%
Mixed / British Mixed	–	–	–	–	3,530	6.5%	8,808	9.5%
Other: Total	–	–	1,508 (Note: Includes ‘Other Asians’)		1,690	3.1%	7,448	8.1%
Unclassified	–	–	80	0.1%	793	1.5%	1,628	1.8%
Non-White: Total	–	6%		23%		36%		62.4%
Total:	–	100%	57,359	100%	54,470	100%	91,786	100%

== Religion ==
Faith in Manchester (2021)
1. Christian (36.2%)
2. No Religion (32.4%)
3. Muslim (22.3%)
4. Hindu (1.10%)
5. Buddhist (0.60%)
6. Sikh (0.50%)
7. Jewish (0.50%)
8. Other Religions (0.50%)
9. Religion Not Stated (5.90%)

Religion in Manchester is complex. Manchester's Jewish population increased and then stabilised around 1851 and in 1881 had a Jewish population of around 7,745, making up 2.3% of the population.

In recent decades, the city has seen a large degree of expansion of its Islamic population, now as of 2021 constituting 22.3% of the population, while Christians have declined in pre-dominance to 36.2% in 2021, from 62.4% in 2001.

Religion	2001		2011		2021	
Religion	Number	%	Number	%	Number	%
Christian	245,203	62.4	245,247	48.7	199,873	36.2
Muslim	35,806	9.1	79,496	15.8	122,962	22.3
Hindu	2,849	0.7	5,452	1.1	6,048	1.1
Buddhist	2,144	0.5	3,879	0.8	3,219	0.6
Sikh	1,708	0.4	2,292	0.5	2,718	0.5
Jewish	3,076	0.8	2,613	0.5	2,632	0.5
Other religion	1,111	0.3	1,889	0.4	2,736	0.5
No religion	62,744	16.0	127,485	25.3	179,037	32.4
Religion not stated	38,178	9.7	34,774	6.9	32,713	5.9
Total	392,819	100%	503,127	100%	551,938	100%

== Languages ==
A variety of languages are spoken in Manchester. 18.3% do not speak English as their main language, although just 2% or fewer residents are unable to speak English at all.

Main language (aged 3+)	2011		2021	
Main language (aged 3+)	Number	%	Number	%
English	400,886	83.4%	434,289	81.7%
Non-English	79,852	16.6%	97,194	18.3%
Total	480,738	100%	531,483	100%

== Industry ==
Manchester's industry sectors over time

Industry sector	Manchester (aged 16 and over in employment)	
Industry sector	2021	
Industry sector	Number	%
A: Agriculture, Forestry and fishing	205	0.1%
B: Mining and quarrying	86	–
C: Manufacturing	10,303	4.4%
D: Electricity, gas, steam and air conditioning supply	969	0.4%
E: Water supply; Sewerage, Waste management and Remediation activities	861	0.4%
F: Construction	11,817	5.0%
G: Wholesale and retail trade; repair of motor vehicles and motorcycles	36,174	15.4%
H: Transport and storage	14,042	6.0%
J: Information and communication	16,420	7.0%
I: Accommodation and food service activities (Distribution or catering; 1981 + 1991)	12,331	5.3%
K: Financial and insurance activities	7,419	3.2%
L: Real estate activities	3,535	1.5%
M: Professional, scientific and technical activities	17,909	7.6%
N: Administrative and support service activities	15,445	6.6%
P: Education	9,945	4.2%
Q: Human health and social work activities	25,443	10.9%
O: Public administration and defence; compulsory social security	40,867	17.4%
R, S, T, U: Other and not stated	10,519	4.5%
Total	234,290	100.0

Method of transportation to work

Method of transportation	Manchester (aged 16 and over in employment)	
Method of transportation	2021	
Method of transportation	Number	%
Work mainly at or from home	73,964	31.6%
Underground, metro, light rail, tram	6,152	2.6%
Train	2,848	1.2%
Bus, minibus or coach	23,669	10.1%
Taxi	3,654	1.6%
Motorcycle, scooter or moped	462	0.2%
Driving a car or van	82,379	35.2%
Passenger in a car or van	8,217	3.5%
Bicycle	7,305	3.1%
On foot	22,647	9.7%
Other method of travel to work (or Not stated)	2,986	1.3%
Total	234,283	100%

== National identity ==
National identity	2021	
National identity	Number	%
British only	310,709	56.3
English only	48,800	8.8
Welsh only	2,310	0.4
Scottish only	–	–
Northern Irish only	–	–
Any combination of UK only identities	6,985	1.3
English and British only	56,401	10.2
Welsh and British only	891	0.2
Scottish and British only	–	–
Northern Irish and British only	–	–
Irish only	6,175	1.1
Irish and at least one UK identity	990	0.2
Other identity only	103,748	18.8
Other identity and at least one UK identity	14,929	2.7
Total	551,938	100%

== Immigration ==
This table list major place of birth for Manchester according to 2021 census:

#	Place	Number
1	England	364,870
2	Pakistan	30,746
3	Nigeria	10,329
4	India	8,930
5	Poland	7,804
6	China	6,784
7	Italy	6,521
8	Ireland	6,096
9	Scotland	5,492
10	Wales	4,661
11	Spain	4,517
12	Bangladesh	4,343
13	Somalia	4,272
14	Northern Ireland	3,647
15	Romania	3,185
16	Iraq	3,146
17	Ghana	2,822
18	Jamaica	2,768
19	Iran	2,759
20	Hong Kong	2,373

== Education ==
Level of qualification	Manchester (aged 16 and over, not in education)	
Level of qualification	2021	
Level of qualification	Number	%
No qualifications	86,110	19.7%
Level 1 and entry level qualifications	34,988	8.0%
Level 2 qualifications	45,164	10.3%
Apprenticeship	15,322	3.5%
Level 3 qualifications	79,621	18.2%
Level 4 qualifications or above	164,763	37.6%
Other qualifications	11,990	2.7%
Total	437,958	100.0

== See also ==
- Demographics of the United Kingdom
- Demographics of England
- Demographics of London
- Demographics of Birmingham
- Demographics of Greater Manchester
- List of English cities by population
- List of English districts by population
- List of English districts and their ethnic composition
- List of English districts by area
- List of English districts by population density
