= List of English districts =

This is a list of the 296 districts of England, a type of country subdivision governed by a local authority, that cover all of England. Most English districts are known as non-metropolitan districts and are found in non-metropolitan counties. However, primarily in urban areas, other types of districts are found. Each district is contained within one ceremonial county, except Stockton-on-Tees, which is split for this purpose. Population figures are the mid-year estimates for 2025 from the Office for National Statistics.

== Nomenclature ==
There are currently 296 districts in England. The districts are divided into several categories which determine the powers and functions of the local authority.

- 132 unitary authority districts in which one council carries out all local government (apart from sometimes parish council/meeting governence), consisting of:
  - 32 London boroughs
  - 36 metropolitan districts
  - 56 combined non-metropolitan districts and non-metropolitan counties
  - 6 non-metropolitan districts
  - City of London (sui generis)
  - Isles of Scilly (sui generis)
- 164 non-metropolitan districts in a two-tier county arrangement, in which local government powers are shared between a district and a county.

Each district can additionally hold the honorific statuses of borough, city and royal borough, which does not affect the powers and functions of the local authority.

== List of districts ==
| Name | Population (2025) | Title | Type | Ceremonial County |
|---|---|---|---|---|
| Adur | 64,802 | District | | West Sussex |
| Amber Valley | 131,894 | Borough | | Derbyshire |
| Arun | 172,326 | District | | West Sussex |
| Ashfield | 130,581 | District | | Nottinghamshire |
| Ashford | 142,523 | Borough | | Kent |
| Babergh | 97,833 | District | | Suffolk |
| Barking and Dagenham | 238,295 | London Borough | London borough | Greater London |
| Barnet | 408,087 | London Borough | London borough | Greater London |
| Barnsley | 252,784 | Metropolitan Borough | Metropolitan borough | South Yorkshire |
| Basildon | 193,489 | Borough | | Essex |
| Basingstoke and Deane | 194,037 | Borough | | Hampshire |
| Bassetlaw | 126,454 | District | | Nottinghamshire |
| Bath and North East Somerset | 200,898 | | Unitary authority | Somerset |
| Bedford | 196,398 | Borough | Unitary authority | Bedfordshire |
| Bexley | 257,103 | London Borough | London borough | Greater London |
| Birmingham | 1,176,960 | City (1889) | Metropolitan borough | West Midlands |
| Blaby | 108,423 | District | | Leicestershire |
| Blackburn with Darwen | 163,801 | Borough | Unitary authority | Lancashire |
| Blackpool | 143,492 | Borough | Unitary authority | Lancashire |
| Bolsover | 84,397 | District | | Derbyshire |
| Bolton | 309,732 | Metropolitan Borough | Metropolitan borough | Greater Manchester |
| Boston | 72,092 | Borough | | Lincolnshire |
| Bournemouth, Christchurch and Poole | 405,829 | Borough | Unitary authority | Dorset |
| Bracknell Forest | 132,145 | Borough | Unitary authority | Berkshire |
| Bradford | 557,758 | City (1897) | Metropolitan borough | West Yorkshire |
| Braintree | 166,471 | District | | Essex |
| Breckland | 148,095 | District | | Norfolk |
| Brent | 352,201 | London Borough | London borough | Greater London |
| Brentwood | 80,104 | Borough | | Essex |
| Brighton and Hove | 284,170 | City (2000) | Unitary authority | East Sussex |
| Bristol | 495,260 | City (1542) | Unitary authority | Bristol |
| Broadland | 139,652 | District | | Norfolk |
| Bromley | 336,048 | London Borough | London borough | Greater London |
| Bromsgrove | 101,973 | District | | Worcestershire |
| Broxbourne | 103,130 | Borough | | Hertfordshire |
| Broxtowe | 113,963 | Borough | | Nottinghamshire |
| Buckinghamshire | 584,296 | | Unitary authority | Buckinghamshire |
| Burnley | 100,946 | Borough | | Lancashire |
| Bury | 199,271 | Metropolitan Borough | Metropolitan borough | Greater Manchester |
| Calderdale | 210,734 | Metropolitan Borough | Metropolitan borough | West Yorkshire |
| Cambridge | 149,872 | City (1951) | | Cambridgeshire |
| Camden | 216,658 | London Borough | London borough | Greater London |
| Cannock Chase | 104,299 | District | | Staffordshire |
| Canterbury | 162,612 | City (TI) | | Kent |
| Castle Point | 90,613 | Borough | | Essex |
| Central Bedfordshire | 321,605 | | Unitary authority | Bedfordshire |
| Charnwood | 189,718 | Borough | | Leicestershire |
| Chelmsford | 190,570 | City (2012) | | Essex |
| Cheltenham | 121,452 | Borough | | Gloucestershire |
| Cherwell | 172,178 | District | | Oxfordshire |
| Cheshire East | 425,459 | Borough | Unitary authority | Cheshire |
| Cheshire West and Chester | 373,951 | Borough | Unitary authority | Cheshire |
| Chesterfield | 106,419 | Borough | | Derbyshire |
| Chichester | 130,224 | District | | West Sussex |
| Chorley | 121,814 | Borough | | Lancashire |
| Colchester | 201,163 | City (2022) | | Essex |
| Cornwall | 584,782 | | Unitary authority | Cornwall |
| Cotswold | 91,563 | District | | Gloucestershire |
| Coventry | 364,766 | City (1345) | Metropolitan borough | West Midlands |
| Crawley | 124,462 | Borough | | West Sussex |
| Croydon | 410,085 | London Borough | London borough | Greater London |
| Cumberland | 274,622 | | Unitary authority | Cumbria |
| Dacorum | 162,316 | Borough | | Hertfordshire |
| Darlington | 113,402 | Borough | Unitary authority | County Durham |
| Dartford | 126,297 | Borough | | Kent |
| Derby | 275,344 | City (1977) | Unitary authority | Derbyshire |
| Derbyshire Dales | 72,028 | District | | Derbyshire |
| Doncaster | 323,016 | City (2022) | Metropolitan borough | South Yorkshire |
| Dorset | 391,036 | | Unitary authority | Dorset |
| Dover | 121,055 | District | | Kent |
| Dudley | 333,941 | Metropolitan Borough | Metropolitan borough | West Midlands |
| County Durham | 539,146 | | Unitary authority | County Durham |
| Ealing | 387,072 | London Borough | London borough | Greater London |
| East Cambridgeshire | 94,599 | District | | Cambridgeshire |
| East Devon | 159,637 | District | | Devon |
| East Hampshire | 130,599 | District | | Hampshire |
| East Hertfordshire | 158,033 | District | | Hertfordshire |
| East Lindsey | 146,756 | District | | Lincolnshire |
| East Riding of Yorkshire | 360,334 | | Unitary authority | East Riding of Yorkshire |
| East Staffordshire | 131,541 | Borough | | Staffordshire |
| East Suffolk | 250,106 | District | | Suffolk |
| Eastbourne | 103,894 | Borough | | East Sussex |
| Eastleigh | 143,710 | Borough | | Hampshire |
| Elmbridge | 142,484 | Borough | | Surrey |
| Enfield | 329,400 | London Borough | London borough | Greater London |
| Epping Forest | 138,394 | District | | Essex |
| Epsom and Ewell | 83,370 | Borough | | Surrey |
| Erewash | 113,474 | Borough | | Derbyshire |
| Exeter | 137,894 | City (TI) | | Devon |
| Fareham | 115,373 | Borough | | Hampshire |
| Fenland | 105,930 | District | | Cambridgeshire |
| Folkestone and Hythe | 112,163 | District | | Kent |
| Forest of Dean | 90,157 | District | | Gloucestershire |
| Fylde | 86,689 | Borough | | Lancashire |
| Gateshead | 202,509 | Metropolitan Borough | Metropolitan borough | Tyne and Wear |
| Gedling | 121,105 | Borough | | Nottinghamshire |
| Gloucester | 138,565 | City (1541) | | Gloucestershire |
| Gosport | 82,618 | Borough | | Hampshire |
| Gravesham | 111,221 | Borough | | Kent |
| Great Yarmouth | 100,957 | Borough | | Norfolk |
| Greenwich | 301,225 | Royal Borough | London borough | Greater London |
| Guildford | 152,148 | Borough | | Surrey |
| Hackney | 266,241 | London Borough | London borough | Greater London |
| Halton | 131,912 | Borough | Unitary authority | Cheshire |
| Hammersmith and Fulham | 190,216 | London Borough | London borough | Greater London |
| Harborough | 106,577 | District | | Leicestershire |
| Haringey | 266,218 | London Borough | London borough | Greater London |
| Harlow | 98,543 | District | | Essex |
| Harrow | 272,612 | London Borough | London borough | Greater London |
| Hart | 103,335 | District | | Hampshire |
| Hartlepool | 99,656 | Borough | Unitary authority | County Durham |
| Hastings | 90,855 | Borough | | East Sussex |
| Havant | 127,362 | Borough | | Hampshire |
| Havering | 280,787 | London Borough | London borough | Greater London |
| Herefordshire | 192,539 | | Unitary authority | Herefordshire |
| Hertsmere | 110,242 | Borough | | Hertfordshire |
| High Peak | 91,676 | Borough | | Derbyshire |
| Hillingdon | 326,671 | London Borough | London borough | Greater London |
| Hinckley and Bosworth | 118,240 | Borough | | Leicestershire |
| Horsham | 152,016 | District | | West Sussex |
| Hounslow | 299,486 | London Borough | London borough | Greater London |
| Kingston upon Hull | 273,257 | City (1299) | Unitary authority | East Riding of Yorkshire |
| Huntingdonshire | 191,941 | District | | Cambridgeshire |
| Hyndburn | 86,908 | Borough | | Lancashire |
| Ipswich | 139,457 | Borough | | Suffolk |
| Isle of Wight | 140,777 | | Unitary authority | Isle of Wight |
| Isles of Scilly | 2,299 | | Sui generis | Cornwall |
| Islington | 224,551 | London Borough | London borough | Greater London |
| Kensington and Chelsea | 145,734 | Royal borough | London borough | Greater London |
| King's Lynn and West Norfolk | 156,943 | Borough | | Norfolk |
| Kingston upon Thames | 172,761 | Royal Borough | London borough | Greater London |
| Kirklees | 445,832 | Metropolitan Borough | Metropolitan borough | West Yorkshire |
| Knowsley | 163,723 | Metropolitan Borough | Metropolitan borough | Merseyside |
| Lambeth | 314,298 | London Borough | London borough | Greater London |
| Lancaster | 145,237 | City (1937) | | Lancashire |
| Leeds | 840,550 | City (1895) | Metropolitan borough | West Yorkshire |
| Leicester | 383,116 | City (1919) | Unitary authority | Leicestershire |
| Lewes | 102,648 | District | | East Sussex |
| Lewisham | 301,037 | London Borough | London borough | Greater London |
| Lichfield | 113,270 | District | | Staffordshire |
| Lincoln | 103,351 | City (TI) | | Lincolnshire |
| Liverpool | 507,915 | City (1880) | Metropolitan borough | Merseyside |
| City of London | 15,631 | City (TI) | Sui generis | City of London |
| Luton | 236,380 | Borough | Unitary authority | Bedfordshire |
| Maidstone | 191,415 | Borough | | Kent |
| Maldon | 70,196 | District | | Essex |
| Malvern Hills | 84,380 | District | | Worcestershire |
| Manchester | 588,256 | City (1853) | Metropolitan borough | Greater Manchester |
| Mansfield | 113,682 | District | | Nottinghamshire |
| Medway | 292,697 | Borough | Unitary authority | Kent |
| Melton | 54,694 | Borough | | Leicestershire |
| Merton | 218,891 | London Borough | London borough | Greater London |
| Mid Devon | 85,593 | District | | Devon |
| Mid Suffolk | 113,047 | District | | Suffolk |
| Mid Sussex | 163,566 | District | | West Sussex |
| Middlesbrough | 152,795 | Borough | Unitary authority | North Yorkshire |
| Milton Keynes | 308,866 | City (2022) | Unitary authority | Buckinghamshire |
| Mole Valley | 88,808 | District | | Surrey |
| Newark and Sherwood | 128,684 | District | | Nottinghamshire |
| Newcastle-under-Lyme | 128,093 | Borough | | Staffordshire |
| Newcastle upon Tyne | 320,838 | City (1882) | Metropolitan borough | Tyne and Wear |
| New Forest | 175,930 | District | | Hampshire |
| Newham | 376,542 | London Borough | London borough | Greater London |
| North Devon | 101,281 | District | | Devon |
| North East Derbyshire | 107,888 | District | | Derbyshire |
| North East Lincolnshire | 160,101 | Borough | Unitary authority | Lincolnshire |
| North Hertfordshire | 137,365 | District | | Hertfordshire |
| North Kesteven | 123,267 | District | | Lincolnshire |
| North Lincolnshire | 171,421 | Borough | Unitary authority | Lincolnshire |
| North Norfolk | 103,708 | District | | Norfolk |
| North Northamptonshire | 359,500 | | Unitary authority | Northamptonshire |
| North Somerset | 227,160 | | Unitary authority | Somerset |
| North Tyneside | 215,401 | Metropolitan Borough | Metropolitan borough | Tyne and Wear |
| North Warwickshire | 67,688 | Borough | | Warwickshire |
| North West Leicestershire | 113,263 | District | | Leicestershire |
| North Yorkshire | 615,491 | | Unitary authority | North Yorkshire |
| Northumberland | 333,975 | | Unitary authority | Northumberland |
| Norwich | 145,676 | City (1195) | | Norfolk |
| Nottingham | 325,765 | City (1897) | Unitary authority | Nottinghamshire |
| Nuneaton and Bedworth | 144,042 | Borough | | Warwickshire |
| Oadby and Wigston | 61,533 | Borough | | Leicestershire |
| Oldham | 251,915 | Metropolitan Borough | Metropolitan borough | Greater Manchester |
| Oxford | 165,940 | City (1542) | | Oxfordshire |
| Pendle | 100,203 | Borough | | Lancashire |
| Peterborough | 224,757 | City (1541) | Unitary authority | Cambridgeshire |
| Plymouth | 271,361 | City (1928) | Unitary authority | Devon |
| Portsmouth | 211,475 | City (1926) | Unitary authority | Hampshire |
| Preston | 164,498 | City (2002) | | Lancashire |
| Reading | 183,762 | Borough | Unitary authority | Berkshire |
| Redbridge | 321,829 | London Borough | London borough | Greater London |
| Redcar and Cleveland | 139,541 | Borough | Unitary authority | North Yorkshire |
| Redditch | 87,548 | Borough | | Worcestershire |
| Reigate and Banstead | 159,413 | Borough | | Surrey |
| Ribble Valley | 66,938 | Borough | | Lancashire |
| Richmond upon Thames | 196,713 | London Borough | London borough | Greater London |
| Rochdale | 237,641 | Metropolitan Borough | Metropolitan borough | Greater Manchester |
| Rochford | 90,760 | District | | Essex |
| Rossendale | 73,688 | Borough | | Lancashire |
| Rother | 96,150 | District | | East Sussex |
| Rotherham | 279,161 | Metropolitan Borough | Metropolitan borough | South Yorkshire |
| Rugby | 125,594 | Borough | | Warwickshire |
| Runnymede | 93,013 | Borough | | Surrey |
| Rushcliffe | 127,857 | Borough | | Nottinghamshire |
| Rushmoor | 106,185 | Borough | | Hampshire |
| Rutland | 41,629 | | Unitary authority | Rutland |
| St Albans | 150,757 | City (1877) | | Hertfordshire |
| St Helens | 189,890 | Metropolitan Borough | Metropolitan borough | Merseyside |
| Salford | 297,004 | City (1926) | Metropolitan borough | Greater Manchester |
| Sandwell | 352,918 | Metropolitan Borough | Metropolitan borough | West Midlands |
| Sefton | 287,583 | Metropolitan Borough | Metropolitan borough | Merseyside |
| Sevenoaks | 123,183 | District | | Kent |
| Sheffield | 579,517 | City (1893) | Metropolitan borough | South Yorkshire |
| Shropshire | 333,162 | | Unitary authority | Shropshire |
| Slough | 167,450 | Borough | Unitary authority | Berkshire |
| Solihull | 221,449 | Metropolitan Borough | Metropolitan borough | West Midlands |
| Somerset | 555,289 | | Unitary authority | Somerset |
| South Cambridgeshire | 174,641 | District | | Cambridgeshire |
| South Derbyshire | 119,441 | District | | Derbyshire |
| South Gloucestershire | 308,787 | | Unitary authority | Gloucestershire |
| South Hams | 93,171 | District | | Devon |
| South Holland | 100,758 | District | | Lincolnshire |
| South Kesteven | 148,069 | District | | Lincolnshire |
| South Norfolk | 150,396 | District | | Norfolk |
| South Oxfordshire | 158,084 | District | | Oxfordshire |
| South Ribble | 117,554 | Borough | | Lancashire |
| South Staffordshire | 114,811 | District | | Staffordshire |
| South Tyneside | 151,255 | Metropolitan Borough | Metropolitan borough | Tyne and Wear |
| Southampton | 259,230 | City (1964) | Unitary authority | Hampshire |
| Southend-on-Sea | 185,214 | City (2022) | Unitary authority | Essex |
| Southwark | 312,366 | London Borough | London borough | Greater London |
| Spelthorne | 107,188 | Borough | | Surrey |
| Stafford | 142,903 | Borough | | Staffordshire |
| Staffordshire Moorlands | 96,764 | District | | Staffordshire |
| Stevenage | 92,081 | Borough | | Hertfordshire |
| Stockport | 304,879 | Metropolitan Borough | Metropolitan borough | Greater Manchester |
| Stockton-on-Tees | 207,158 | Borough | Unitary authority | County Durham and North Yorkshire |
| Stoke-on-Trent | 272,282 | City (1925) | Unitary authority | Staffordshire |
| Stratford-on-Avon | 148,772 | District | | Warwickshire |
| Stroud | 126,418 | District | | Gloucestershire |
| Sunderland | 287,070 | City (1992) | Metropolitan borough | Tyne and Wear |
| Surrey Heath | 95,094 | Borough | | Surrey |
| Sutton | 213,972 | London Borough | London borough | Greater London |
| Swale | 160,671 | Borough | | Kent |
| Swindon | 245,286 | Borough | Unitary authority | Wiltshire |
| Tameside | 240,822 | Metropolitan Borough | Metropolitan borough | Greater Manchester |
| Tamworth | 81,392 | Borough | | Staffordshire |
| Tandridge | 90,322 | District | | Surrey |
| Teignbridge | 138,607 | District | | Devon |
| Telford and Wrekin | 199,378 | Borough | Unitary authority | Shropshire |
| Tendring | 159,060 | District | | Essex |
| Test Valley | 135,698 | Borough | | Hampshire |
| Tewkesbury | 103,753 | Borough | | Gloucestershire |
| Thanet | 143,618 | District | | Kent |
| Three Rivers | 96,068 | District | | Hertfordshire |
| Thurrock | 181,664 | Borough | Unitary authority | Essex |
| Tonbridge and Malling | 137,913 | Borough | | Kent |
| Torbay | 139,486 | Borough | Unitary authority | Devon |
| Torridge | 70,378 | District | | Devon |
| Tower Hamlets | 334,240 | London Borough | London borough | Greater London |
| Trafford | 240,981 | Metropolitan Borough | Metropolitan borough | Greater Manchester |
| Tunbridge Wells | 120,098 | Borough | | Kent |
| Uttlesford | 96,762 | District | | Essex |
| Vale of White Horse | 152,217 | District | | Oxfordshire |
| Wakefield | 369,450 | City (1888) | Metropolitan borough | West Yorkshire |
| Walsall | 295,722 | Metropolitan Borough | Metropolitan borough | West Midlands |
| Waltham Forest | 283,713 | London Borough | London borough | Greater London |
| Wandsworth | 339,859 | London Borough | London borough | Greater London |
| Warrington | 215,425 | Borough | Unitary authority | Cheshire |
| Warwick | 157,925 | District | | Warwickshire |
| Watford | 107,658 | Borough | | Hertfordshire |
| Waverley | 137,218 | Borough | | Surrey |
| Wealden | 168,308 | District | | East Sussex |
| Welwyn Hatfield | 121,748 | Borough | | Hertfordshire |
| West Berkshire | 165,523 | | Unitary authority | Berkshire |
| West Devon | 58,980 | Borough | | Devon |
| West Lancashire | 123,564 | District | | Lancashire |
| West Lindsey | 99,716 | District | | Lincolnshire |
| Westminster | 212,367 | City (1540) | London borough | Greater London |
| Westmorland and Furness | 225,390 | | Unitary authority | Cumbria |
| West Northamptonshire | 425,700 | | Unitary authority | Northamptonshire |
| West Oxfordshire | 121,412 | District | | Oxfordshire |
| West Suffolk | 189,407 | District | | Suffolk |
| Wigan | 347,089 | Metropolitan Borough | Metropolitan borough | Greater Manchester |
| Wiltshire | 526,392 | | Unitary authority | Wiltshire |
| Winchester | 136,856 | City (TI) | | Hampshire |
| Windsor and Maidenhead | 159,776 | Royal borough | Unitary authority | Berkshire |
| Wirral | 329,896 | Metropolitan Borough | Metropolitan borough | Merseyside |
| Woking | 106,197 | Borough | | Surrey |
| Wokingham | 189,024 | Borough | Unitary authority | Berkshire |
| Wolverhampton | 281,434 | City (2000) | Metropolitan borough | West Midlands |
| Worcester | 106,954 | City (1189) | | Worcestershire |
| Worthing | 113,844 | Borough | | West Sussex |
| Wychavon | 139,175 | District | | Worcestershire |
| Wyre | 120,528 | Borough | | Lancashire |
| Wyre Forest | 104,179 | District | | Worcestershire |
| York | 209,118 | City (TI) | Unitary authority | North Yorkshire |

== See also ==
- List of English districts by population
- List of English districts by area
- List of English districts by population density
- List of English districts by ethnicity
- List of rural and urban districts in England in 1973
- 2019-2023 structural changes to local government in England
