= List of English districts by ethnicity =

This is a list of districts of England showing their ethnic composition as recorded in the 2021 census. There were 309 English districts at the time of the 2021 census.

Census respondents were asked, 'What is your ethnic group? Choose one section from A to E, then tick one box to best describe your ethnic group or background'. The sections offered were:

- A White
  - English, Welsh, Scottish, Northern Irish or British
  - Irish
  - Gypsy or Irish Traveller
  - Roma
  - Any other White background
- B Mixed or Multiple ethnic groups
  - White and Black Caribbean
  - White and Black African
  - White and Asian
  - Any other Mixed or Multiple background
- C Asian or Asian British
  - Indian
  - Pakistani
  - Bangladeshi
  - Chinese
  - Any other Asian background
- D Black, Black British, Caribbean or African
  - Caribbean
  - African background
  - Any other Black, Black British or Caribbean background
- E Other ethnic group
  - Arab
  - Any other ethnic group

English districts by ethnicity (2021)
District	White %	Mixed %	Asian %	Black %	Arab or Other %
Adur	93.4	2.5	2.2	0.8	1.1
Allerdale	98.5	0.7	0.6	0.1	0.2
Amber Valley	97.3	1.2	1	0.3	0.2
Arun	95.8	1.5	1.6	0.5	0.6
Ashfield	95.1	1.6	1.6	1.2	0.4
Ashford	88.1	2.2	5.8	2.6	1.4
Babergh	96.7	1.5	0.9	0.5	0.4
Barking and Dagenham	44.9	4.3	25.9	21.4	3.6
Barnet	57.7	5.4	19.3	7.9	9.8
Barnsley	96.9	0.9	0.9	0.7	0.5
Barrow-in-Furness	97	0.8	1.4	0.4	0.4
Basildon	87.5	2.6	4.3	4.8	0.9
Basingstoke and Deane	88.5	2.5	5.9	2	1.1
Bassetlaw	96.4	1.2	1.2	0.6	0.5
Bath and North East Somerset	92.2	2.7	3.3	1	0.8
Bedford	75.7	4.6	12.6	5.3	1.8
Bexley	71.9	3.5	9.9	12.2	2.5
Birmingham	48.6	4.8	31	11	4.5
Blaby	86.2	2.7	8.3	1.5	1.3
Blackburn with Darwen	60.4	1.7	35.7	0.9	1.4
Blackpool	94.7	1.6	2.6	0.5	0.6
Bolsover	97.4	0.9	0.9	0.5	0.3
Bolton	71.9	2.2	20.1	3.8	1.9
Boston	94.7	1.4	2	0.7	1.2
Bournemouth, Christchurch and Poole	91.3	2.8	3.4	1.1	1.5
Bracknell Forest	86.1	3.1	7.1	2.4	1.3
Bradford	61.1	2.7	32.1	2	2
Braintree	94.7	1.9	1.7	1.2	0.5
Breckland	96.5	1.4	0.9	0.6	0.6
Brent	34.6	5.1	32.8	17.5	10
Brentwood	88.5	3.1	5.1	2.3	1.1
Brighton and Hove	85.4	4.8	4.8	2	3.1
Bristol	81.1	4.5	6.6	5.9	1.9
Broadland	96.3	1.4	1.4	0.5	0.4
Bromley	76.5	5.4	8.3	7.6	2.3
Bromsgrove	93.1	2.4	3.2	0.8	0.5
Broxbourne	81.1	4	3.7	6.7	4.6
Broxtowe	88.9	2.5	5.5	1.7	1.3
Buckinghamshire	79.9	3.5	12.4	2.6	1.6
Burnley	82.5	1.6	14.7	0.3	0.8
Bury	82.9	2.6	10.6	1.9	1.9
Calderdale	86.1	1.9	10.5	0.7	0.8
Cambridge	74.5	5.1	14.8	2.4	3.1
Camden	59.5	6.6	18.1	9	6.8
Cannock Chase	96.6	1.4	1.2	0.5	0.3
Canterbury	89.2	2.7	4.1	2.5	1.5
Carlisle	96.8	0.9	1.5	0.3	0.5
Castle Point	94.9	1.6	1.7	1.3	0.5
Central Bedfordshire	90.2	3	3.5	2.4	0.8
Charnwood	82.3	2.5	12.4	1.5	1.2
Chelmsford	88.5	2.6	5.3	2.6	0.9
Cheltenham	91.4	2.5	4.1	1	1
Cherwell	88.1	2.9	6	1.8	1.3
Cheshire East	94.4	1.8	2.4	0.6	0.8
Cheshire West and Chester	95.3	1.5	2	0.6	0.6
Chesterfield	95.5	1.4	1.9	0.8	0.4
Chichester	95.4	1.6	1.7	0.6	0.5
Chorley	95.6	1.5	1.9	0.6	0.4
City of London	69.4	5.5	16.8	2.7	5.6
Colchester	87	2.9	5.1	3.5	1.5
Copeland	98	0.7	0.8	0.3	0.3
Cornwall	96.8	1.2	0.7	0.2	1.1
Cotswold	96.3	1.5	1.3	0.4	0.4
County Durham	96.8	0.9	1.5	0.3	0.4
Coventry	65.5	3.4	18.5	8.9	3.7
Craven	96.9	1	1.7	0.2	0.3
Crawley	73.4	4.1	15.4	4.5	2.7
Croydon	48.4	7.6	17.5	22.6	3.9
Dacorum	86.8	3.4	5.8	2.8	1.2
Darlington	94.4	1.4	2.8	0.7	0.9
Dartford	74.5	3.1	9.9	10.5	2
Derby	73.8	3.7	15.6	4	2.9
Derbyshire Dales	97.8	1	0.7	0.2	0.3
Doncaster	93.1	1.5	2.9	1.2	1.2
Dorset	97.1	1.2	1.1	0.3	0.4
Dover	94.9	1.5	2.1	0.7	0.9
Dudley	84.9	2.8	8.4	2.5	1.4
Ealing	43.2	5.2	30.3	10.8	10.6
East Cambridgeshire	94.5	2.1	1.9	0.8	0.7
East Devon	97.4	1.1	1	0.2	0.3
East Hampshire	95.4	1.7	1.9	0.5	0.5
East Hertfordshire	92.3	2.8	2.7	1.3	0.9
East Lindsey	97.8	1	0.8	0.2	0.2
East Riding of Yorkshire	97.4	0.9	1.1	0.3	0.4
East Staffordshire	86.3	2.2	9.3	1.1	1.1
East Suffolk District	96.2	1.5	1.4	0.6	0.4
Eastbourne	90.8	2.8	3.5	1.3	1.7
Eastleigh	92.4	2.1	3.9	1	0.7
Eden	98.1	0.7	0.8	0.2	0.3
Elmbridge	86.1	4.1	6.5	1.2	2
Enfield	52.1	5.9	11.5	18.3	12.1
Epping Forest	84.1	3.6	7.2	2.9	2.2
Epsom and Ewell	79.5	4.4	11.4	1.9	2.8
Erewash	95.4	1.8	1.6	0.8	0.4
Exeter	90.3	2.5	4.9	0.9	1.4
Fareham	95.6	1.5	1.8	0.6	0.4
Fenland	95.9	1.4	1.2	0.8	0.7
Folkestone and Hythe	92.6	1.9	3.9	0.6	1
Forest of Dean	97.5	1.1	0.7	0.3	0.4
Fylde	96.3	1.4	1.4	0.4	0.5
Gateshead	93.5	1.2	2.5	1.1	1.6
Gedling	89.5	3.5	3.9	2.3	0.9
Gloucester	84.9	3.8	6.5	3.6	1.2
Gosport	95.3	1.5	1.4	1.2	0.5
Gravesham	76.6	2.6	11.2	6.5	3
Great Yarmouth	94.6	1.6	1.9	1.1	0.8
Greenwich	55.7	6	13.2	21	4.2
Guildford	86.9	3.1	6.7	1.5	1.9
Hackney	53.1	6.7	10.4	21.1	8.7
Halton	96.5	1.4	1.1	0.4	0.6
Hambleton	97.9	0.8	0.7	0.3	0.3
Hammersmith and Fulham	63.2	6.7	10.5	12.3	7.3
Harborough	91	2.1	5.4	0.7	0.8
Haringey	57	7	8.7	17.6	9.7
Harlow	82.7	3.3	6	6.2	1.8
Harrogate	95.4	1.6	1.8	0.6	0.5
Harrow	36.5	3.8	45.2	7.3	7.2
Hart	92.5	2.2	3.6	0.8	0.8
Hartlepool	96.5	0.7	1.7	0.5	0.6
Hastings	91.4	2.9	2.8	1.4	1.5
Havant	95.9	1.4	1.7	0.6	0.4
Havering	75.3	3.7	10.7	8.2	2
Herefordshire	96.9	1.1	1.2	0.3	0.5
Hertsmere	77.1	3.7	10.5	4.8	3.8
High Peak	97.4	1.3	0.8	0.2	0.2
Hillingdon	48.2	4.4	33.3	7.8	6.3
Hinckley and Bosworth	94.3	1.8	2.8	0.6	0.6
Horsham	93.6	2.1	2.7	0.9	0.6
Hounslow	44.1	4.7	36.7	7.2	7.3
Hull	91.8	1.7	2.8	1.9	1.8
Huntingdonshire	92.4	2.2	3.2	1.5	0.7
Hyndburn	82.7	1.3	15.1	0.3	0.7
Ipswich	84.3	4.6	5.5	3.5	2.1
Isle of Wight	97	1.2	1.2	0.3	0.3
Isles of Scilly	97.5	1.1	0.3	0.2	0.9
Islington	62.2	7.5	9.9	13.3	7.1
Kensington and Chelsea	63.7	6.6	11.9	7.9	9.9
King's Lynn and West Norfolk	95.6	1.3	1.9	0.5	0.7
Kingston upon Thames	68.3	5.4	17.8	2.8	5.7
Kirklees	73.6	3.1	19.4	2.3	1.5
Knowsley	95.3	1.7	1.6	0.8	0.6
Lambeth	55	8.1	7.3	24	5.7
Lancaster	93.1	1.5	3.6	0.9	0.9
Leeds	79	3.4	9.7	5.6	2.3
Leicester	40.9	3.8	43.4	7.8	4.1
Lewes	94.2	2.5	1.9	0.7	0.7
Lewisham	51.5	8.1	9	26.8	4.7
Lichfield	94.8	1.9	2.3	0.6	0.4
Lincoln	92.2	2	3.2	1.4	1.2
Liverpool	84	3.5	5.7	3.5	3.3
Luton	45.2	4.3	37	10.1	3.5
Maidstone	89.8	2.3	4.7	2.1	1.2
Maldon	96.9	1.4	1.1	0.4	0.3
Malvern Hills	96.6	1.4	1.3	0.3	0.3
Manchester	56.8	5.3	20.9	11.9	5.1
Mansfield	94.8	1.4	2	1.1	0.7
Medway	84.3	2.8	5.9	5.6	1.4
Melton	96.9	1.3	1.2	0.4	0.3
Mendip	96.8	1.4	1.1	0.3	0.3
Merton	60.2	5.9	18.6	10.6	4.6
Mid Devon	97.8	1.1	0.7	0.1	0.3
Mid Suffolk	96.8	1.4	0.8	0.5	0.4
Mid Sussex	92.2	2.5	3.6	0.9	0.8
Middlesbrough	82.4	2.1	10.5	2.7	2.4
Milton Keynes	71.8	4.1	12.4	9.7	2
Mole Valley	92.7	2.5	3	0.8	0.9
New Forest	96.8	1.3	1.2	0.4	0.4
Newark and Sherwood	96.3	1.5	1.1	0.7	0.4
Newcastle upon Tyne	80	2.3	11.4	3.3	3.1
Newcastle-under-Lyme	92.9	1.6	3.8	1	0.7
Newham	30.8	4.7	42.2	17.5	4.9
North Devon	97	1.2	1.2	0.3	0.3
North East Derbyshire	97.4	1.1	0.9	0.3	0.2
North East Lincolnshire	96.2	1	1.6	0.5	0.7
North Hertfordshire	87.5	3.7	5.2	2.4	1.1
North Kesteven	97.2	1.2	1	0.4	0.3
North Lincolnshire	94.3	1.1	3.3	0.5	0.8
North Norfolk	98.1	0.9	0.5	0.2	0.2
North Northamptonshire	90.3	2.3	3.5	3.1	0.8
North Somerset	95.7	1.7	1.5	0.5	0.6
North Tyneside	94.9	1.4	2.6	0.6	0.6
North Warwickshire	96.1	1.7	1.3	0.6	0.3
North West Leicestershire	95.9	1.5	1.5	0.6	0.5
Northumberland	97.6	0.8	1.1	0.2	0.3
Norwich	87.1	3.1	5.5	2.5	1.8
Nottingham	65.9	5.9	14.9	10	3.3
Nuneaton and Bedworth	87.1	1.8	8	1.8	1.2
Oadby and Wigston	63.4	3.2	27.9	2.2	3.3
Oldham	68.1	2.5	24.6	3.4	1.4
Oxford	70.7	5.6	15.4	4.7	3.7
Pendle	70.6	1.6	26.7	0.3	0.9
Peterborough	75.4	3.5	14.3	4.1	2.7
Plymouth	94	1.8	2.2	1.1	1
Portsmouth	85.2	2.6	6.9	3.4	1.8
Preston	72.6	3	20.2	2.4	1.9
Reading	67.1	5.1	17.7	7.2	2.9
Redbridge	34.8	4.1	47.3	8.4	5.4
Redcar and Cleveland	97.7	0.9	0.8	0.2	0.4
Redditch	89.8	2.6	5.7	1.2	0.6
Reigate and Banstead	84.4	3.7	7.5	2.9	1.4
Ribble Valley	96.2	1.2	2.1	0.2	0.3
Richmond upon Thames	80.5	5.5	8.9	1.9	3.3
Richmondshire	94.4	0.9	2.7	0.9	1.1
Rochdale	74	2.4	18.5	3.5	1.6
Rochford	95.9	1.7	1.4	0.7	0.3
Rossendale	92.4	1.5	5.5	0.2	0.4
Rother	95.6	1.8	1.5	0.6	0.5
Rotherham	91	1.4	5.3	1.1	1.1
Rugby	85.7	2.8	7.6	2.7	1.1
Runnymede	83.5	3.5	9.2	1.8	1.9
Rushcliffe	89.7	2.8	5.7	0.9	0.9
Rushmoor	77.4	2.6	14.7	2.5	2.8
Rutland	94.8	1.8	1.5	1.3	0.5
Ryedale	98.2	0.8	0.6	0.2	0.3
Salford	82.3	3.1	5.5	6.1	2.9
Sandwell	57.2	4.3	25.8	8.7	4
Scarborough	97	1	1.3	0.3	0.5
Sedgemoor	96.6	1.1	1.4	0.3	0.5
Sefton	95.8	1.5	1.5	0.5	0.7
Selby	97.7	1	0.8	0.2	0.4
Sevenoaks	92.1	2.6	2.9	1.6	0.8
Sheffield	79.1	3.5	9.6	4.6	3.2
Shropshire	96.7	1.2	1.3	0.3	0.4
Slough	36	4	46.7	7.6	5.7
Solihull	82.2	3.5	11	1.8	1.5
Somerset West and Taunton	95.6	1.3	2	0.5	0.5
South Cambridgeshire	89	2.8	5.8	1.2	1.1
South Derbyshire	93.1	1.8	3.6	0.8	0.7
South Gloucestershire	91.2	2.5	3.8	1.6	0.9
South Hams	97.5	1.2	0.7	0.2	0.4
South Holland	96.3	1.3	1.2	0.5	0.6
South Kesteven	95.8	1.4	1.8	0.6	0.4
South Lakeland	97.7	1	0.8	0.2	0.3
South Norfolk	95.4	1.5	1.8	0.8	0.5
South Oxfordshire	93.1	2.3	2.9	1	0.8
South Ribble	95.4	1.7	2.1	0.5	0.3
South Somerset	96.6	1.2	1.3	0.5	0.4
South Staffordshire	93.7	2	2.8	0.9	0.5
South Tyneside	94.4	1.4	2.9	0.5	0.8
Southampton	80.7	3.3	10.6	3	2.3
Southend-on-Sea	87.5	3.1	5.5	2.9	1.1
Southwark	51.4	7.2	9.9	25.1	6.3
Spelthorne	78.7	3.7	12.8	2.5	2.4
St Albans	83.6	4.3	8.2	2.1	1.8
St Helens	96.5	1.1	1.4	0.4	0.6
Stafford	93.4	1.9	3	1.1	0.7
Staffordshire Moorlands	98	0.9	0.7	0.2	0.2
Stevenage	82.8	3.6	7.5	4.8	1.3
Stockport	87.4	2.6	7.3	1.2	1.6
Stockton-on-Tees	92	1.4	4.6	1.1	0.8
Stoke-on-Trent	83.5	2.3	9.9	2.7	1.7
Stratford-on-Avon	95.5	1.7	1.9	0.4	0.5
Stroud	96.4	1.8	1	0.4	0.4
Sunderland	94.6	0.9	3	1	0.5
Surrey Heath	85	2.7	8.9	1.6	1.8
Sutton	68.3	4.8	17.5	5.9	3.4
Swale	93.8	1.8	1.5	2.3	0.5
Swindon	81.5	2.8	11.6	2.6	1.5
Tameside	85.5	2.1	9.2	2.3	0.8
Tamworth	95.8	1.9	1.4	0.6	0.4
Tandridge	89.4	3.8	3.7	2.2	0.9
Teignbridge	97.7	1.2	0.7	0.2	0.3
Telford and Wrekin	88.2	2.6	5.4	2.9	0.9
Tendring	96.2	1.6	1.2	0.6	0.4
Test Valley	93.1	1.8	3.3	1.1	0.8
Tewkesbury	95.1	1.8	2	0.6	0.5
Thanet	93	2.4	2.3	1.1	1.2
Three Rivers	77.1	3.6	15.2	2.4	1.7
Thurrock	76.7	3	6.9	11.9	1.5
Tonbridge and Malling	93.3	2.2	2.9	1	0.6
Torbay	96.1	1.5	1.6	0.3	0.4
Torridge	98.2	0.9	0.5	0.1	0.2
Tower Hamlets	39.4	5	44.4	7.3	3.9
Trafford	77.8	3.8	12.6	3.4	2.5
Tunbridge Wells	91.5	2.6	4	1	1
Uttlesford	94.5	2.2	1.9	0.8	0.7
Vale of White Horse	90.8	2.5	4	1.7	1.1
Wakefield	93	1.4	3.6	1.3	0.7
Walsall	71.4	3.3	18.7	4.6	2.1
Waltham Forest	52.8	6.5	19.9	15	5.8
Wandsworth	67.8	6.3	11.7	10.1	4.1
Warrington	93.5	1.6	3.3	0.7	0.9
Warwick	84.6	3	9.7	1.1	1.6
Watford	60.9	4.7	24.5	6.3	3.6
Waverley	93.7	2.2	2.8	0.7	0.6
Wealden	96	1.7	1.4	0.4	0.5
Welwyn Hatfield	78.7	4.1	8.8	6.1	2.3
West Berkshire	91.9	2.4	3.7	1.3	0.7
West Devon	97.8	1.1	0.6	0.2	0.3
West Lancashire	96.9	1.3	1	0.3	0.4
West Lindsey	97	1.1	1.2	0.3	0.4
West Northamptonshire	85.9	2.8	5.3	4.9	1.1
West Oxfordshire	95.2	1.9	1.7	0.6	0.6
West Suffolk District	91.8	2.7	2.6	1.6	1.3
Westminster	55.2	6.5	16.8	8.1	13.5
Wigan	95	1.3	1.8	1.2	0.7
Wiltshire	94.3	1.7	2.1	1.1	0.7
Winchester	93.6	2	3.1	0.6	0.7
Windsor and Maidenhead	79.8	3.4	13.1	1.5	2.1
Wirral	95.2	1.5	2.3	0.4	0.6
Woking	78.4	3.5	14.2	1.8	2.1
Wokingham	79.9	3.1	12.9	2.4	1.6
Wolverhampton	60.6	5.3	21.2	9.3	3.6
Worcester	90	2.2	5.6	1.2	1
Worthing	91.4	2.6	3.9	1.2	1
Wychavon	96.9	1.2	1.1	0.3	0.5
Wyre	97.5	1	1	0.2	0.3
Wyre Forest	95.9	1.4	1.9	0.4	0.4
York	92.8	1.8	3.8	0.7	1

== See also ==
- List of English districts
- List of English districts by population
- List of English districts by area
- List of English districts by population density
