= List of English districts by population density =

This is a list of the 296 districts of England ordered by population density, according to estimated figures for 2025 from the Office for National Statistics.

The list consists of 132 unitary authority districts and 164 two-tier districts.

Local authority districts of England by population density (2025)
Rank	District	Density (/km^{2})	Density (/mi^{2})	Type	Ceremonial county	Region
1	Tower Hamlets	16,906	43,790	London borough	Greater London	London
2	Islington	15,113	39,140	London borough	Greater London	London
3	Hackney	13,980	36,200	London borough	Greater London	London
4	Kensington and Chelsea	12,019	31,130	London borough, royal borough	Greater London	London
5	Lambeth	11,724	30,370	London borough	Greater London	London
6	Hammersmith and Fulham	11,598	30,040	London borough	Greater London	London
7	Southwark	10,817	28,020	London borough	Greater London	London
8	Newham	10,403	26,940	London borough	Greater London	London
9	Camden	9,948	25,770	London borough	Greater London	London
10	Wandsworth	9,919	25,690	London borough	Greater London	London
11	Westminster	9,886	25,600	London borough, city (1540)	Greater London	London
12	Haringey	8,992	23,290	London borough	Greater London	London
13	Lewisham	8,565	22,180	London borough	Greater London	London
14	Brent	8,146	21,100	London borough	Greater London	London
15	Waltham Forest	7,310	18,900	London borough	Greater London	London
16	Ealing	6,969	18,050	London borough	Greater London	London
17	Barking and Dagenham	6,601	17,100	London borough	Greater London	London
18	Greenwich	6,367	16,490	London borough, royal borough	Greater London	London
19	Merton	5,818	15,070	London borough	Greater London	London
20	Redbridge	5,707	14,780	London borough	Greater London	London
21	Luton	5,452	14,120	Unitary authority, borough	Bedfordshire	East of England
22	City of London	5,409	14,010	Sui generis, city (TI)	City of London	London
23	Harrow	5,402	13,990	London borough	Greater London	London
24	Hounslow	5,352	13,860	London borough	Greater London	London
25	Portsmouth	5,236	13,560	Unitary authority, city (1926)	Hampshire	South East
26	Leicester	5,224	13,530	Unitary authority, city (1919)	Leicestershire	East Midlands
27	Southampton	5,197	13,460	Unitary authority, city (1964)	Hampshire	South East
28	Slough	5,146	13,330	Unitary authority, borough	Berkshire	South East
29	Manchester	5,086	13,170	Metropolitan borough, city (1853)	Greater Manchester	North West
30	Watford	5,024	13,010	Non-metropolitan district, borough	Hertfordshire	East of England
31	Sutton	4,880	12,600	London borough	Greater London	London
32	Croydon	4,743	12,280	London borough	Greater London	London
33	Barnet	4,703	12,180	London borough	Greater London	London
34	Kingston upon Thames	4,637	12,010	London borough, royal borough	Greater London	London
35	Reading	4,549	11,780	Unitary authority, borough	Berkshire	South East
36	Liverpool	4,541	11,760	Metropolitan borough, city (1880)	Merseyside	North West
37	Bristol	4,516	11,700	Unitary authority, city (1542)	Bristol	South West
38	Southend-on-Sea	4,444	11,510	Unitary authority, borough, city	Essex	East of England
39	Birmingham	4,395	11,380	Metropolitan borough, city (1889)	West Midlands	West Midlands
40	Nottingham	4,365	11,310	Unitary authority, city (1897)	Nottinghamshire	East Midlands
41	Bexley	4,245	10,990	London borough	Greater London	London
42	Sandwell	4,124	10,680	Metropolitan borough	West Midlands	West Midlands
43	Blackpool	4,115	10,660	Unitary authority, borough	Lancashire	North West
44	Enfield	4,077	10,560	London borough	Greater London	London
45	Wolverhampton	4,053	10,500	Metropolitan borough, city (2000)	West Midlands	West Midlands
46	Kingston upon Hull	3,818	9,890	Unitary authority, city (1299)	East Riding of Yorkshire	Yorkshire and the Humber
47	Norwich	3,735	9,670	Non-metropolitan district, city (1195)	Norfolk	East of England
48	Coventry	3,698	9,580	Metropolitan borough, city (1345)	West Midlands	West Midlands
49	Cambridge	3,683	9,540	Non-metropolitan district, city (1951)	Cambridgeshire	East of England
50	Oxford	3,639	9,420	Non-metropolitan district, city (1542)	Oxfordshire	South East
51	Stevenage	3,546	9,180	Non-metropolitan district, borough	Hertfordshire	East of England
52	Ipswich	3,530	9,100	Non-metropolitan district, borough	Suffolk	East of England
53	Derby	3,529	9,140	Unitary authority, city (1977)	Derbyshire	East Midlands
54	Worthing	3,501	9,070	Non-metropolitan district, borough	West Sussex	South East
55	Brighton and Hove	3,431	8,890	Unitary authority, city (2000)	East Sussex	South East
56	Richmond upon Thames	3,428	8,880	London borough	Greater London	London
57	Gloucester	3,417	8,850	Non-metropolitan district, city (1541)	Gloucestershire	South West
58	Dudley	3,408	8,830	Metropolitan borough	West Midlands	West Midlands
59	Plymouth	3,399	8,800	Unitary authority, city (1928)	Devon	South West
60	Gosport	3,256	8,430	Non-metropolitan district, borough	Hampshire	South East
61	Harlow	3,226	8,360	Non-metropolitan district	Essex	East of England
62	Worcester	3,207	8,310	Non-metropolitan district, city (1189)	Worcestershire	West Midlands
63	Salford	3,056	7,920	Metropolitan borough, city (1926)	Greater Manchester	North West
64	Hastings	3,048	7,890	Non-metropolitan district, borough	East Sussex	South East
65	Exeter	2,932	7,590	Non-metropolitan district, city (TI)	Devon	South West
66	Stoke-on-Trent	2,914	7,550	Unitary authority, city (1925)	Staffordshire	West Midlands
67	Lincoln	2,896	7,500	Non-metropolitan district, city (TI)	Lincolnshire	East Midlands
68	Walsall	2,844	7,370	Metropolitan borough	West Midlands	West Midlands
69	Middlesbrough	2,836	7,350	Unitary authority, borough	North Yorkshire	North East
70	Newcastle upon Tyne	2,828	7,320	Metropolitan borough, city (1882)	Tyne and Wear	North East
71	Hillingdon	2,823	7,310	London borough	Greater London	London
72	Crawley	2,769	7,170	Non-metropolitan district, borough	West Sussex	South East
73	Rushmoor	2,719	7,040	Non-metropolitan district, borough	Hampshire	South East
74	Tamworth	2,639	6,830	Non-metropolitan district, borough	Staffordshire	West Midlands
75	North Tyneside	2,617	6,780	Metropolitan borough	Tyne and Wear	North East
76	Oadby and Wigston	2,616	6,780	Non-metropolitan district, borough	Leicestershire	East Midlands
77	Cheltenham	2,607	6,750	Non-metropolitan district, borough	Gloucestershire	South West
78	Bournemouth, Christchurch and Poole	2,504	6,490	Unitary authority	Dorset	South West
79	Havering	2,500	6,500	London borough	Greater London	London
80	Epsom and Ewell	2,446	6,340	Non-metropolitan district, borough	Surrey	South East
81	Stockport	2,419	6,270	Metropolitan borough	Greater Manchester	North West
82	Spelthorne	2,387	6,180	Non-metropolitan district, borough	Surrey	South East
83	Eastbourne	2,353	6,090	Non-metropolitan district, borough	East Sussex	South East
84	South Tyneside	2,348	6,080	Metropolitan borough	Tyne and Wear	North East
85	Tameside	2,335	6,050	Metropolitan borough	Greater Manchester	North West
86	Havant	2,284	5,920	Non-metropolitan district, borough	Hampshire	South East
87	Trafford	2,273	5,890	Metropolitan borough	Greater Manchester	North West
88	Bromley	2,238	5,800	London borough	Greater London	London
89	Torbay	2,218	5,740	Unitary authority, borough	Devon	South West
90	Bolton	2,216	5,740	Metropolitan borough	Greater Manchester	North West
91	Sunderland	2,089	5,410	Metropolitan borough, city (1992)	Tyne and Wear	North East
92	Wirral	2,050	5,300	Metropolitan borough	Merseyside	North West
93	Castle Point	2,029	5,260	Non-metropolitan district, borough	Essex	East of England
94	Broxbourne	2,004	5,190	Non-metropolitan district, borough	Hertfordshire	East of England
95	Bury	2,004	5,190	Metropolitan borough	Greater Manchester	North West
96	Knowsley	1,893	4,900	Metropolitan borough	Merseyside	North West
97	Wigan	1,845	4,780	Metropolitan borough	Greater Manchester	North West
98	Sefton	1,837	4,760	Metropolitan borough	Merseyside	North West
99	Nuneaton and Bedworth	1,825	4,730	Non-metropolitan district, borough	Warwickshire	West Midlands
100	Eastleigh	1,803	4,670	Non-metropolitan district, borough	Hampshire	South East
101	Oldham	1,770	4,600	Metropolitan borough	Greater Manchester	North West
102	Basildon	1,759	4,560	Non-metropolitan district, borough	Essex	East of England
103	Dartford	1,736	4,500	Non-metropolitan district, borough	Kent	South East
104	Woking	1,670	4,300	Non-metropolitan district, borough	Surrey	South East
105	Halton	1,668	4,320	Unitary authority, borough	Cheshire	North West
106	Redditch	1,614	4,180	Non-metropolitan district, borough	Worcestershire	West Midlands
107	Chesterfield	1,611	4,170	Non-metropolitan district, borough	Derbyshire	East Midlands
108	Sheffield	1,575	4,080	Metropolitan borough, city (1893)	South Yorkshire	Yorkshire and the Humber
109	Fareham	1,554	4,020	Non-metropolitan district, borough	Hampshire	South East
110	Adur	1,540	4,000	Non-metropolitan district	West Sussex	South East
111	Leeds	1,524	3,950	Metropolitan borough, city (1893)	West Yorkshire	Yorkshire and the Humber
112	Bradford	1,522	3,940	Metropolitan borough, city (1897)	West Yorkshire	Yorkshire and the Humber
113	Medway	1,511	3,910	Unitary authority	Kent	South East
114	Rochdale	1,503	3,890	Metropolitan borough	Greater Manchester	North West
115	Elmbridge	1,499	3,880	Non-metropolitan district, borough	Surrey	South East
116	Mansfield	1,482	3,840	Non-metropolitan district	Nottinghamshire	East Midlands
117	Broxtowe	1,423	3,690	Non-metropolitan district, borough	Nottinghamshire	East Midlands
118	Gateshead	1,423	3,690	Metropolitan borough	Tyne and Wear	North East
119	St Helens	1,393	3,610	Metropolitan borough	Merseyside	North West
120	Thanet	1,386	3,590	Non-metropolitan district	Kent	South East
121	Cannock Chase	1,322	3,420	Non-metropolitan district	Staffordshire	West Midlands
122	Solihull	1,242	3,220	Metropolitan borough	West Midlands	West Midlands
123	Reigate and Banstead	1,234	3,200	Non-metropolitan district, borough	Surrey	South East
124	Bracknell Forest	1,208	3,130	Unitary authority, borough	Berkshire	South East
125	Blackburn with Darwen	1,195	3,100	Unitary authority, borough	Lancashire	North West
126	Warrington	1,193	3,090	Unitary authority, borough	Cheshire	North West
127	Runnymede	1,192	3,090	Non-metropolitan district, borough	Surrey	South East
128	Ashfield	1,192	3,090	Non-metropolitan district	Nottinghamshire	East Midlands
129	Hyndburn	1,191	3,080	Non-metropolitan district, borough	Lancashire	North West
130	Preston	1,156	2,990	Non-metropolitan district, city (2002)	Lancashire	North West
131	Gravesham	1,124	2,910	Non-metropolitan district, borough	Kent	South East
132	Thurrock	1,109	2,870	Unitary authority, borough	Essex	East of England
133	Kirklees	1,091	2,830	Metropolitan borough	West Yorkshire	Yorkshire and the Humber
134	Wakefield	1,091	2,830	Metropolitan borough, city (1888)	West Yorkshire	Yorkshire and the Humber
135	Hertsmere	1,090	2,800	Non-metropolitan district, borough	Hertfordshire	East of England
136	Three Rivers	1,082	2,800	Non-metropolitan district	Hertfordshire	East of England
137	Swindon	1,066	2,760	Unitary authority, borough	Wiltshire	South West
138	Hartlepool	1,063	2,750	Unitary authority, borough	Durham	North East
139	Wokingham	1,056	2,740	Unitary authority	Berkshire	South East
140	South Ribble	1,039	2,690	Non-metropolitan district, borough	Lancashire	North West
141	Erewash	1,035	2,680	Non-metropolitan district, borough	Derbyshire	East Midlands
142	Stockton-on-Tees	1,011	2,620	Unitary authority, borough	Durham and North Yorkshire	North East
143	Gedling	1,009	2,610	Non-metropolitan district, borough	Nottinghamshire	East Midlands
144	Milton Keynes	1,001	2,590	Unitary authority, borough, city (2022)	Buckinghamshire	South East
145	Surrey Heath	1,000	2,600	Non-metropolitan district, borough	Surrey	South East
146	Rotherham	974	2,520	Metropolitan borough	South Yorkshire	Yorkshire and the Humber
147	Welwyn Hatfield	940	2,400	Non-metropolitan district	Hertfordshire	East of England
148	St Albans	935	2,420	Non-metropolitan district, city (1877)	Hertfordshire	East of England
149	Burnley	912	2,360	Non-metropolitan district, borough	Lancashire	North West
150	North East Lincolnshire	831	2,150	Unitary authority, borough	Lincolnshire	Yorkshire and the Humber
151	Blaby	831	2,150	Non-metropolitan district	Leicestershire	East Midlands
152	Windsor and Maidenhead	813	2,110	Unitary authority, royal borough	Berkshire	South East
153	Arun	780	2,000	Non-metropolitan district	West Sussex	South East
154	York	769	1,990	Unitary authority, city (TI)	North Yorkshire	Yorkshire and the Humber
155	Barnsley	768	1,990	Metropolitan borough	South Yorkshire	Yorkshire and the Humber
156	Dacorum	764	1,980	Non-metropolitan district, borough	Hertfordshire	East of England
157	Telford and Wrekin	687	1,780	Unitary authority, borough	Shropshire	West Midlands
158	Charnwood	680	1,800	Non-metropolitan district, borough	Leicestershire	East Midlands
159	Peterborough	655	1,700	Unitary authority, city (1541)	Cambridgeshire	East of England
160	South Gloucestershire	621	1,610	Unitary authority	Gloucestershire	South West
161	Colchester	613	1,590	Non-metropolitan district, borough, city (2022)	Essex	East of England
162	North Somerset	608	1,570	Unitary authority	Somerset	South West
163	Newcastle-under-Lyme	607	1,570	Non-metropolitan district, borough	Staffordshire	West Midlands
164	Chorley	601	1,560	Non-metropolitan district, borough	Lancashire	North West
165	Pendle	592	1,530	Non-metropolitan district, borough	Lancashire	North West
166	Bath and North East Somerset	581	1,500	Unitary authority	Somerset	South West
167	Great Yarmouth	579	1,500	Non-metropolitan district, borough	Norfolk	East of England
168	Calderdale	579	1,500	Metropolitan borough	West Yorkshire	Yorkshire and the Humber
169	Tonbridge and Malling	574	1,490	Non-metropolitan district, borough	Kent	South East
170	Darlington	574	1,490	Unitary authority, borough	Durham	North East
171	Redcar and Cleveland	569	1,470	Unitary authority, borough	North Yorkshire	North East
172	Doncaster	569	1,470	Metropolitan borough, city (2022)	South Yorkshire	Yorkshire and the Humber
173	Chelmsford	563	1,460	Non-metropolitan district, city (2012)	Essex	East of England
174	Guildford	562	1,460	Non-metropolitan district, borough	Surrey	South East
175	Warwick	558	1,450	Non-metropolitan district	Warwickshire	West Midlands
176	Rochford	543	1,410	Non-metropolitan district	Essex	East of England
177	Rossendale	534	1,380	Non-metropolitan district, borough	Lancashire	North West
178	Wyre Forest	533	1,380	Non-metropolitan district	Worcestershire	West Midlands
179	Canterbury	527	1,360	Non-metropolitan district, city (TI)	Kent	South East
180	Bolsover	526	1,360	Non-metropolitan district	Derbyshire	East Midlands
181	Fylde	523	1,350	Non-metropolitan district, borough	Lancashire	North West
182	Brentwood	523	1,350	Non-metropolitan district, borough	Essex	East of England
183	Amber Valley	497	1,290	Non-metropolitan district, borough	Derbyshire	East Midlands
184	Mid Sussex	490	1,300	Non-metropolitan district	West Sussex	South East
185	Maidstone	487	1,260	Non-metropolitan district, borough	Kent	South East
186	Hart	480	1,200	Non-metropolitan district	Hampshire	South East
187	Tendring	473	1,230	Non-metropolitan district	Essex	East of England
188	Bromsgrove	470	1,200	Non-metropolitan district	Worcestershire	West Midlands
189	Central Bedfordshire	449	1,160	Unitary authority	Bedfordshire	East of England
190	Swale	430	1,100	Non-metropolitan district, borough	Kent	South East
191	Wyre	427	1,110	Non-metropolitan district, borough	Lancashire	North West
192	Bedford	412	1,070	Unitary authority, borough	Bedfordshire	East of England
193	Epping Forest	408	1,060	Non-metropolitan district	Essex	East of England
194	Cheshire West and Chester	406	1,050	Unitary authority, borough	Cheshire	North West
195	North West Leicestershire	405	1,050	Non-metropolitan district	Leicestershire	East Midlands
196	Hinckley and Bosworth	398	1,030	Non-metropolitan district, borough	Leicestershire	East Midlands
197	Waverley	398	1,030	Non-metropolitan district, borough	Surrey	South East
198	North East Derbyshire	391	1,010	Non-metropolitan district	Derbyshire	East Midlands
199	North Northamptonshire	385	1,000	Unitary authority	Northamptonshire	East Midlands
200	Dover	384	990	Non-metropolitan district	Kent	South East
201	Buckinghamshire	373	970	Unitary authority	Buckinghamshire	South East
202	Isle of Wight	371	960	Unitary authority	Isle of Wight	South East
203	North Hertfordshire	366	950	Non-metropolitan district	Hertfordshire	East of England
204	Cheshire East	365	950	Unitary authority, borough	Cheshire	North West
205	Tandridge	364	940	Non-metropolitan district	Surrey	South East
206	Tunbridge Wells	363	940	Non-metropolitan district, borough	Kent	South East
207	Rugby	358	930	Non-metropolitan district, borough	Warwickshire	West Midlands
208	West Lancashire	356	920	Non-metropolitan district	Lancashire	North West
209	South Derbyshire	353	910	Non-metropolitan district	Derbyshire	East Midlands
210	Lewes	351	910	Non-metropolitan district	East Sussex	South East
211	Mole Valley	344	890	Non-metropolitan district	Surrey	South East
212	Lichfield	342	890	Non-metropolitan district	Staffordshire	West Midlands
213	East Staffordshire	340	880	Non-metropolitan district, borough	Staffordshire	West Midlands
214	Sevenoaks	334	870	Non-metropolitan district	Kent	South East
215	East Hertfordshire	332	860	Non-metropolitan district	Hertfordshire	East of England
216	West Northamptonshire	323	840	Unitary authority	Northamptonshire	East Midlands
217	Folkestone and Hythe	314	810	Non-metropolitan district	Kent	South East
218	Rushcliffe	312	810	Non-metropolitan district, borough	Nottinghamshire	East Midlands
219	Basingstoke and Deane	306	790	Non-metropolitan district, borough	Hampshire	South East
220	Cherwell	292	760	Non-metropolitan district	Oxfordshire	South East
221	Horsham	287	740	Non-metropolitan district	West Sussex	South East
222	South Staffordshire	282	730	Non-metropolitan district	Staffordshire	West Midlands
223	Stroud	274	710	Non-metropolitan district	Gloucestershire	South West
224	Braintree	272	700	Non-metropolitan district	Essex	East of England
225	Vale of White Horse	264	680	Non-metropolitan district	Oxfordshire	South East
226	Lancaster	256	660	Non-metropolitan district, city (1937)	Lancashire	North West
227	East Hampshire	254	660	Non-metropolitan district	Hampshire	South East
228	Broadland	253	660	Non-metropolitan district	Norfolk	East of England
229	Tewkesbury	250	650	Non-metropolitan district, borough	Gloucestershire	South West
230	Ashford	245	630	Non-metropolitan district, borough	Kent	South East
231	County Durham	242	630	Unitary authority	Durham	North East
232	Stafford	239	620	Non-metropolitan district	Staffordshire	West Midlands
233	North Warwickshire	238	620	Non-metropolitan district, borough	Warwickshire	West Midlands
234	West Berkshire	235	610	Unitary authority	Berkshire	South East
235	New Forest	234	610	Non-metropolitan district	Hampshire	South East
236	South Oxfordshire	233	600	Non-metropolitan district	Oxfordshire	South East
237	Test Valley	216	560	Non-metropolitan district, borough	Hampshire	South East
238	Huntingdonshire	212	550	Non-metropolitan district	Cambridgeshire	East of England
239	Wychavon	210	540	Non-metropolitan district	Worcestershire	West Midlands
240	Winchester	207	540	Non-metropolitan district, city (TI)	Hampshire	South East
241	Teignbridge	206	530	Non-metropolitan district	Devon	South West
242	North Lincolnshire	202	520	Unitary authority, borough	Lincolnshire	Yorkshire and the Humber
243	Wealden	202	520	Non-metropolitan district	East Sussex	South East
244	East Suffolk	198	510	Non-metropolitan district	Suffolk	East of England
245	Bassetlaw	198	510	Non-metropolitan district	Nottinghamshire	East Midlands
246	Boston	198	510	Non-metropolitan district, borough	Lincolnshire	East Midlands
247	Newark and Sherwood	198	510	Non-metropolitan district	Nottinghamshire	East Midlands
248	Maldon	196	510	Non-metropolitan district	Essex	East of England
249	East Devon	196	510	Non-metropolitan district	Devon	South West
250	Fenland	194	500	Non-metropolitan district	Cambridgeshire	East of England
251	South Cambridgeshire	194	500	Non-metropolitan district	Cambridgeshire	East of England
252	Rother	189	490	Non-metropolitan district	East Sussex	South East
253	West Suffolk	183	470	Non-metropolitan district	Suffolk	East of England
254	Harborough	180	470	Non-metropolitan district	Leicestershire	East Midlands
255	Forest of Dean	171	440	Non-metropolitan district	Gloucestershire	South West
256	Somerset	171	440	Unitary authority	Somerset	South West
257	High Peak	170	440	Non-metropolitan district, borough	Derbyshire	East Midlands
258	West Oxfordshire	170	440	Non-metropolitan district	Oxfordshire	South East
259	Staffordshire Moorlands	168	440	Non-metropolitan district	Staffordshire	West Midlands
260	South Norfolk	166	430	Non-metropolitan district	Norfolk	East of England
261	Chichester	166	430	Non-metropolitan district	West Sussex	South East
262	Cornwall	165	430	Unitary authority	Cornwall	South West
263	Babergh	165	430	Non-metropolitan district	Suffolk	East of England
264	Wiltshire	162	420	Unitary authority	Wiltshire	South West
265	South Kesteven	157	410	Non-metropolitan district	Lincolnshire	East Midlands
266	Dorset	157	410	Unitary authority	Dorset	South West
267	Stratford-on-Avon	152	390	Non-metropolitan district	Warwickshire	West Midlands
268	Uttlesford	151	390	Non-metropolitan district	Essex	East of England
269	East Riding of Yorkshire	150	390	Unitary authority	East Riding of Yorkshire	Yorkshire and the Humber
270	Malvern Hills	146	380	Non-metropolitan district	Worcestershire	West Midlands
271	East Cambridgeshire	145	380	Non-metropolitan district	Cambridgeshire	East of England
272	Isles of Scilly	141	370	Sui generis	Cornwall	South West
273	South Holland	134	350	Non-metropolitan district	Lincolnshire	East Midlands
274	North Kesteven	134	350	Non-metropolitan district	Lincolnshire	East Midlands
275	Mid Suffolk	130	340	Non-metropolitan district	Suffolk	East of England
276	Ribble Valley	115	300	Non-metropolitan district, borough	Lancashire	North West
277	Melton	114	300	Non-metropolitan district, borough	Leicestershire	East Midlands
278	Breckland	113	290	Non-metropolitan district	Norfolk	East of England
279	Rutland	109	280	Unitary authority	Rutland	East Midlands
280	King's Lynn and West Norfolk	109	280	Non-metropolitan district, borough	Norfolk	East of England
281	North Norfolk	107	280	Non-metropolitan district	Norfolk	East of England
282	South Hams	105	270	Non-metropolitan district	Devon	South West
283	Shropshire	104	270	Unitary authority	Shropshire	West Midlands
284	Mid Devon	94	240	Non-metropolitan district	Devon	South West
285	Cumberland	94	240	Unitary authority	Cumbria	North West
286	North Devon	93	240	Non-metropolitan district	Devon	South West
287	Derbyshire Dales	91	240	Non-metropolitan district	Derbyshire	East Midlands
288	Herefordshire	88	230	Unitary authority	Herefordshire	West Midlands
289	West Lindsey	86	220	Non-metropolitan district	Lincolnshire	East Midlands
290	East Lindsey	83	210	Non-metropolitan district	Lincolnshire	East Midlands
291	North Yorkshire	80	210	Unitary authority	North Yorkshire	Yorkshire and the Humber
292	Cotswold	79	200	Non-metropolitan district	Gloucestershire	South West
293	Torridge	72	190	Non-metropolitan district	Devon	South West
294	Northumberland	67	170	Unitary authority	Northumberland	North East
295	Westmorland and Furness	62	160	Unitary authority	Cumbria	North West
296	West Devon	51	130	Non-metropolitan district, borough	Devon	South West

== See also ==
- List of English districts
- List of English districts by population
- List of English districts by area
- List of English districts by ethnicity
