= List of English districts by population =

This is a list of the 296 districts of England ordered by population, according to estimated figures for 2025 from the Office for National Statistics. These legally-defined districts may be larger or smaller than the urban areas commonly known by the same name.

The list consists of the 130 unitary authorities (including the London boroughs and metropolitan boroughs), the 164 two-tier non-metropolitan districts, and two sui generis authorities (the City of London and the Isles of Scilly).

Local authority districts of England by population (2025)
Rank	District	Population	Type	Ceremonial county	Region
1	Birmingham	1,176,960	Metropolitan borough, city (1889)	West Midlands	West Midlands
2	Leeds	840,550	Metropolitan borough, city (1893)	West Yorkshire	Yorkshire and the Humber
3	North Yorkshire	639,133	Unitary authority	North Yorkshire	Yorkshire and the Humber
4	Somerset	590,972	Unitary authority	Somerset	South West
5	Manchester	588,256	Metropolitan borough, city (1853)	Greater Manchester	North West
6	Cornwall	584,782	Unitary authority	Cornwall	South West
7	Buckinghamshire	584,296	Unitary authority	Buckinghamshire	South East
8	Sheffield	579,517	Metropolitan borough, city (1893)	South Yorkshire	Yorkshire and the Humber
9	Bradford	557,758	Metropolitan borough, city (1897)	West Yorkshire	Yorkshire and the Humber
10	County Durham	539,146	Unitary authority	Durham	North East
11	Wiltshire	526,392	Unitary authority	Wiltshire	South West
12	Liverpool	507,915	Metropolitan borough, city (1880)	Merseyside	North West
13	Bristol	495,260	Unitary authority, city (1542)	Bristol	South West
14	Kirklees	445,832	Metropolitan borough	West Yorkshire	Yorkshire and the Humber
15	West Northamptonshire	444,218	Unitary authority	Northamptonshire	East Midlands
16	Cheshire East	425,459	Unitary authority, borough	Cheshire	North West
17	Croydon	410,085	London borough	Greater London	London
18	Barnet	408,087	London borough	Greater London	London
19	Bournemouth, Christchurch and Poole	405,829	Unitary authority	Dorset	South West
20	Dorset	391,036	Unitary authority	Dorset	South West
21	Ealing	387,072	London borough	Greater London	London
22	Leicester	383,116	Unitary authority, city (1919)	Leicestershire	East Midlands
23	North Northamptonshire	379,569	Unitary authority	Northamptonshire	East Midlands
24	Newham	376,542	London borough	Greater London	London
25	Cheshire West and Chester	373,951	Unitary authority, borough	Cheshire	North West
26	Wakefield	369,450	Metropolitan borough, city (1888)	West Yorkshire	Yorkshire and the Humber
27	Coventry	364,766	Metropolitan borough, city (1345)	West Midlands	West Midlands
28	East Riding of Yorkshire	360,334	Unitary authority	East Riding of Yorkshire	Yorkshire and the Humber
29	Sandwell	352,918	Metropolitan borough	West Midlands	West Midlands
30	Brent	352,201	London borough	Greater London	London
31	Wigan	347,089	Metropolitan borough	Greater Manchester	North West
32	Wandsworth	339,859	London borough	Greater London	London
33	Bromley	336,048	London borough	Greater London	London
34	Tower Hamlets	334,240	London borough	Greater London	London
35	Northumberland	333,975	Unitary authority	Northumberland	North East
36	Dudley	333,941	Metropolitan borough	West Midlands	West Midlands
37	Shropshire	333,162	Unitary authority	Shropshire	West Midlands
38	Wirral	329,896	Metropolitan borough	Merseyside	North West
39	Enfield	329,400	London borough	Greater London	London
40	Hillingdon	326,671	London borough	Greater London	London
41	Nottingham	325,765	Unitary authority, city (1897)	Nottinghamshire	East Midlands
42	Doncaster	323,016	Metropolitan borough, city (2022)	South Yorkshire	Yorkshire and the Humber
43	Redbridge	321,829	London borough	Greater London	London
44	Central Bedfordshire	321,605	Unitary authority	Bedfordshire	East of England
45	Newcastle upon Tyne	320,838	Metropolitan borough, city (1882)	Tyne and Wear	North East
46	Lambeth	314,298	London borough	Greater London	London
47	Southwark	312,366	London borough	Greater London	London
48	Bolton	309,732	Metropolitan borough	Greater Manchester	North West
49	Milton Keynes	308,866	Unitary authority, borough, city (2022)	Buckinghamshire	South East
50	South Gloucestershire	308,787	Unitary authority	Gloucestershire	South West
51	Stockport	304,879	Metropolitan borough	Greater Manchester	North West
52	Greenwich	301,225	London borough, royal borough	Greater London	London
53	Lewisham	301,037	London borough	Greater London	London
54	Hounslow	299,486	London borough	Greater London	London
55	Salford	297,004	Metropolitan borough, city (1926)	Greater Manchester	North West
56	Walsall	295,722	Metropolitan borough	West Midlands	West Midlands
57	Medway	292,697	Unitary authority	Kent	South East
58	Sefton	287,583	Metropolitan borough	Merseyside	North West
59	Sunderland	287,070	Metropolitan borough, city (1992)	Tyne and Wear	North East
60	Brighton and Hove	284,170	Unitary authority, city (2000)	East Sussex	South East
61	Waltham Forest	283,713	London borough	Greater London	London
62	Cumberland	282,343	Unitary authority	Cumbria	North West
63	Wolverhampton	281,434	Metropolitan borough, city (2000)	West Midlands	West Midlands
64	Havering	280,787	London borough	Greater London	London
65	Rotherham	279,161	Metropolitan borough	South Yorkshire	Yorkshire and the Humber
66	Derby	275,344	Unitary authority, city (1977)	Derbyshire	East Midlands
67	Kingston upon Hull	273,257	Unitary authority, city (1897)	East Riding of Yorkshire	Yorkshire and the Humber
68	Harrow	272,612	London borough	Greater London	London
69	Stoke-on-Trent	272,282	Unitary authority, city (1925)	Staffordshire	West Midlands
70	Plymouth	271,361	Unitary authority, city (1928)	Devon	South West
71	Hackney	266,241	London borough	Greater London	London
72	Haringey	266,218	London borough	Greater London	London
73	Southampton	259,230	Unitary authority, city (1964)	Hampshire	South East
74	Bexley	257,103	London borough	Greater London	London
75	Barnsley	252,784	Metropolitan borough	South Yorkshire	Yorkshire and the Humber
76	Oldham	251,915	Metropolitan borough	Greater Manchester	North West
77	East Suffolk	250,106	Non-metropolitan district	Suffolk	East of England
78	Swindon	245,286	Unitary authority, borough	Wiltshire	South West
79	Trafford	240,981	Metropolitan borough	Greater Manchester	North West
80	Tameside	240,822	Metropolitan borough	Greater Manchester	North West
81	Barking and Dagenham	238,295	London borough	Greater London	London
82	Rochdale	237,641	Metropolitan borough	Greater Manchester	North West
83	Luton	236,380	Unitary authority, borough	Bedfordshire	East of England
84	Westmorland and Furness	231,307	Unitary authority	Cumbria	North West
85	North Somerset	227,160	Unitary authority	Somerset	South West
86	Peterborough	224,757	Unitary authority, city (1541)	Cambridgeshire	East of England
87	Islington	224,551	London borough	Greater London	London
88	Solihull	221,449	Metropolitan borough	West Midlands	West Midlands
89	Merton	218,891	London borough	Greater London	London
90	Camden	216,658	London borough	Greater London	London
91	Warrington	215,425	Unitary authority, borough	Cheshire	North West
92	North Tyneside	215,401	Metropolitan borough	Tyne and Wear	North East
93	Sutton	213,972	London borough	Greater London	London
94	Westminster	212,367	London borough, city (1540)	Greater London	London
95	Portsmouth	211,475	Unitary authority, city (1926)	Hampshire	South East
96	Calderdale	210,734	Metropolitan borough	West Yorkshire	Yorkshire and the Humber
97	York	209,118	Unitary authority, city (TI)	North Yorkshire	Yorkshire and the Humber
98	Stockton-on-Tees	207,158	Unitary authority, borough	Durham and North Yorkshire	North East
99	Gateshead	202,509	Metropolitan borough	Tyne and Wear	North East
100	Colchester	201,163	Non-metropolitan district, borough, city (2022)	Essex	East of England
101	Bath and North East Somerset	200,898	Unitary authority	Somerset	South West
102	Telford and Wrekin	199,378	Unitary authority, borough	Shropshire	West Midlands
103	Bury	199,271	Metropolitan borough	Greater Manchester	North West
104	Richmond upon Thames	196,713	London borough	Greater London	London
105	Bedford	196,398	Unitary authority, borough	Bedfordshire	East of England
106	Basingstoke and Deane	194,037	Non-metropolitan district, borough	Hampshire	South East
107	Basildon	193,489	Non-metropolitan district, borough	Essex	East of England
108	Herefordshire	192,539	Unitary authority	Herefordshire	West Midlands
109	Huntingdonshire	191,941	Non-metropolitan district	Cambridgeshire	East of England
110	Maidstone	191,415	Non-metropolitan district, borough	Kent	South East
111	Chelmsford	190,570	Non-metropolitan district, city (2012)	Essex	East of England
112	Hammersmith and Fulham	190,216	London borough	Greater London	London
113	St Helens	189,890	Metropolitan borough	Merseyside	North West
114	Charnwood	189,718	Non-metropolitan district, borough	Leicestershire	East Midlands
115	West Suffolk	189,407	Non-metropolitan district	Suffolk	East of England
116	Wokingham	189,024	Unitary authority	Berkshire	South East
117	Southend-on-Sea	185,214	Unitary authority, borough, city	Essex	East of England
118	Reading	183,762	Unitary authority, borough	Berkshire	South East
119	Thurrock	181,664	Unitary authority, borough	Essex	East of England
120	New Forest	175,930	Non-metropolitan district	Hampshire	South East
121	South Cambridgeshire	174,641	Non-metropolitan district	Cambridgeshire	East of England
122	Kingston upon Thames	172,761	London borough, royal borough	Greater London	London
123	Arun	172,326	Non-metropolitan district	West Sussex	South East
124	Cherwell	172,178	Non-metropolitan district	Oxfordshire	South East
125	North Lincolnshire	171,421	Unitary authority, borough	Lincolnshire	Yorkshire and the Humber
126	Wealden	168,308	Non-metropolitan district	East Sussex	South East
127	Slough	167,450	Unitary authority, borough	Berkshire	South East
128	Braintree	166,471	Non-metropolitan district	Essex	East of England
129	Oxford	165,940	Non-metropolitan district, city (1542)	Oxfordshire	South East
130	West Berkshire	165,523	Unitary authority	Berkshire	South East
131	Preston	164,498	Non-metropolitan district, city (2002)	Lancashire	North West
132	Blackburn with Darwen	163,801	Unitary authority, borough	Lancashire	North West
133	Knowsley	163,723	Metropolitan borough	Merseyside	North West
134	Mid Sussex	163,566	Non-metropolitan district	West Sussex	South East
135	Canterbury	162,612	Non-metropolitan district, city (TI)	Kent	South East
136	Dacorum	162,316	Non-metropolitan district, borough	Hertfordshire	East of England
137	Swale	160,671	Non-metropolitan district, borough	Kent	South East
138	North East Lincolnshire	160,101	Unitary authority, borough	Lincolnshire	Yorkshire and the Humber
139	Windsor and Maidenhead	159,776	Unitary authority, royal borough	Berkshire	South East
140	East Devon	159,637	Non-metropolitan district	Devon	South West
141	Reigate and Banstead	159,413	Non-metropolitan district, borough	Surrey	South East
142	Tendring	159,060	Non-metropolitan district	Essex	East of England
143	South Oxfordshire	158,084	Non-metropolitan district	Oxfordshire	South East
144	East Hertfordshire	158,033	Non-metropolitan district	Hertfordshire	East of England
145	Warwick	157,925	Non-metropolitan district	Warwickshire	West Midlands
146	King's Lynn and West Norfolk	156,943	Non-metropolitan district, borough	Norfolk	East of England
147	Middlesbrough	152,795	Unitary authority, borough	North Yorkshire	North East
148	Vale of White Horse	152,217	Non-metropolitan district	Oxfordshire	South East
149	Guildford	152,148	Non-metropolitan district, borough	Surrey	South East
150	Horsham	152,016	Non-metropolitan district	West Sussex	South East
151	South Tyneside	151,255	Metropolitan borough	Tyne and Wear	North East
152	St Albans	150,757	Non-metropolitan district, city (1877)	Hertfordshire	East of England
153	South Norfolk	150,396	Non-metropolitan district	Norfolk	East of England
154	Cambridge	149,872	Non-metropolitan district, city (1951)	Cambridgeshire	East of England
155	Stratford-on-Avon	148,772	Non-metropolitan district	Warwickshire	West Midlands
156	Breckland	148,095	Non-metropolitan district	Norfolk	East of England
157	South Kesteven	148,069	Non-metropolitan district	Lincolnshire	East Midlands
158	East Lindsey	146,756	Non-metropolitan district	Lincolnshire	East Midlands
159	Kensington and Chelsea	145,734	London borough, royal borough	Greater London	London
160	Norwich	145,676	Non-metropolitan district, city (1195)	Norfolk	East of England
161	Lancaster	145,237	Non-metropolitan district, city (1937)	Lancashire	North West
162	Nuneaton and Bedworth	144,042	Non-metropolitan district, borough	Warwickshire	West Midlands
163	Eastleigh	143,710	Non-metropolitan district, borough	Hampshire	South East
164	Thanet	143,618	Non-metropolitan district	Kent	South East
165	Blackpool	143,492	Unitary authority, borough	Lancashire	North West
166	Stafford	142,903	Non-metropolitan district	Staffordshire	West Midlands
167	Ashford	142,523	Non-metropolitan district, borough	Kent	South East
168	Elmbridge	142,484	Non-metropolitan district, borough	Surrey	South East
169	Isle of Wight	140,777	Unitary authority	Isle of Wight	South East
170	Broadland	139,652	Non-metropolitan district	Norfolk	East of England
171	Redcar and Cleveland	139,541	Unitary authority, borough	North Yorkshire	North East
172	Torbay	139,486	Unitary authority, borough	Devon	South West
173	Ipswich	139,457	Non-metropolitan district, borough	Suffolk	East of England
174	Wychavon	139,175	Non-metropolitan district	Worcestershire	West Midlands
175	Teignbridge	138,607	Non-metropolitan district	Devon	South West
176	Gloucester	138,565	Non-metropolitan district, city (1541)	Gloucestershire	South West
177	Epping Forest	138,394	Non-metropolitan district	Essex	East of England
178	Tonbridge and Malling	137,913	Non-metropolitan district, borough	Kent	South East
179	Exeter	137,894	Non-metropolitan district, city (TI)	Devon	South West
180	North Hertfordshire	137,365	Non-metropolitan district	Hertfordshire	East of England
181	Waverley	137,218	Non-metropolitan district, borough	Surrey	South East
182	Winchester	136,856	Non-metropolitan district, city (TI)	Hampshire	South East
183	Test Valley	135,698	Non-metropolitan district, borough	Hampshire	South East
184	Bracknell Forest	132,145	Unitary authority, borough	Berkshire	South East
185	Halton	131,912	Unitary authority, borough	Cheshire	North West
186	Amber Valley	131,894	Non-metropolitan district, borough	Derbyshire	East Midlands
187	East Staffordshire	131,541	Non-metropolitan district, borough	Staffordshire	West Midlands
188	East Hampshire	130,599	Non-metropolitan district	Hampshire	South East
189	Ashfield	130,581	Non-metropolitan district	Nottinghamshire	East Midlands
190	Chichester	130,224	Non-metropolitan district	West Sussex	South East
191	Newark and Sherwood	128,684	Non-metropolitan district	Nottinghamshire	East Midlands
192	Newcastle-under-Lyme	128,093	Non-metropolitan district, borough	Staffordshire	West Midlands
193	Rushcliffe	127,857	Non-metropolitan district, borough	Nottinghamshire	East Midlands
194	Havant	127,362	Non-metropolitan district, borough	Hampshire	South East
195	Bassetlaw	126,454	Non-metropolitan district	Nottinghamshire	East Midlands
196	Stroud	126,418	Non-metropolitan district	Gloucestershire	South West
197	Dartford	126,297	Non-metropolitan district, borough	Kent	South East
198	Rugby	125,594	Non-metropolitan district, borough	Warwickshire	West Midlands
199	Crawley	124,462	Non-metropolitan district, borough	West Sussex	South East
200	West Lancashire	123,564	Non-metropolitan district	Lancashire	North West
201	North Kesteven	123,267	Non-metropolitan district	Lincolnshire	East Midlands
202	Sevenoaks	123,183	Non-metropolitan district	Kent	South East
203	Chorley	121,814	Non-metropolitan district, borough	Lancashire	North West
204	Welwyn Hatfield	121,748	Non-metropolitan district	Hertfordshire	East of England
205	Cheltenham	121,452	Non-metropolitan district, borough	Gloucestershire	South West
206	West Oxfordshire	121,412	Non-metropolitan district	Oxfordshire	South East
207	Gedling	121,105	Non-metropolitan district, borough	Nottinghamshire	East Midlands
208	Dover	121,055	Non-metropolitan district	Kent	South East
209	Wyre	120,528	Non-metropolitan district, borough	Lancashire	North West
210	Tunbridge Wells	120,098	Non-metropolitan district, borough	Kent	South East
211	South Derbyshire	119,441	Non-metropolitan district	Derbyshire	East Midlands
212	Hinckley and Bosworth	118,240	Non-metropolitan district, borough	Leicestershire	East Midlands
213	South Ribble	117,554	Non-metropolitan district, borough	Lancashire	North West
214	Fareham	115,373	Non-metropolitan district, borough	Hampshire	South East
215	South Staffordshire	114,811	Non-metropolitan district	Staffordshire	West Midlands
216	Broxtowe	113,963	Non-metropolitan district, borough	Nottinghamshire	East Midlands
217	Worthing	113,844	Non-metropolitan district, borough	West Sussex	South East
218	Mansfield	113,682	Non-metropolitan district	Nottinghamshire	East Midlands
219	Erewash	113,474	Non-metropolitan district, borough	Derbyshire	East Midlands
220	Darlington	113,402	Unitary authority, borough	Durham	North East
221	Lichfield	113,270	Non-metropolitan district	Staffordshire	West Midlands
222	North West Leicestershire	113,263	Non-metropolitan district	Leicestershire	East Midlands
223	Mid Suffolk	113,047	Non-metropolitan district	Suffolk	East of England
224	Folkestone and Hythe	112,163	Non-metropolitan district	Kent	South East
225	Gravesham	111,221	Non-metropolitan district, borough	Kent	South East
226	Hertsmere	110,242	Non-metropolitan district, borough	Hertfordshire	East of England
227	Blaby	108,423	Non-metropolitan district	Leicestershire	East Midlands
228	North East Derbyshire	107,888	Non-metropolitan district	Derbyshire	East Midlands
229	Watford	107,658	Non-metropolitan district, borough	Hertfordshire	East of England
230	Spelthorne	107,188	Non-metropolitan district, borough	Surrey	South East
231	Worcester	106,954	Non-metropolitan district, city (1189)	Worcestershire	West Midlands
232	Harborough	106,577	Non-metropolitan district	Leicestershire	East Midlands
233	Chesterfield	106,419	Non-metropolitan district, borough	Derbyshire	East Midlands
234	Woking	106,197	Non-metropolitan district, borough	Surrey	South East
235	Rushmoor	106,185	Non-metropolitan district, borough	Hampshire	South East
236	Fenland	105,930	Non-metropolitan district	Cambridgeshire	East of England
237	Cannock Chase	104,299	Non-metropolitan district	Staffordshire	West Midlands
238	Wyre Forest	104,179	Non-metropolitan district	Worcestershire	West Midlands
239	Eastbourne	103,894	Non-metropolitan district, borough	East Sussex	South East
240	Tewkesbury	103,753	Non-metropolitan district, borough	Gloucestershire	South West
241	North Norfolk	103,708	Non-metropolitan district	Norfolk	East of England
242	Lincoln	103,351	Non-metropolitan district, city (TI)	Lincolnshire	East Midlands
243	Hart	103,335	Non-metropolitan district	Hampshire	South East
244	Broxbourne	103,130	Non-metropolitan district, borough	Hertfordshire	East of England
245	Lewes	102,648	Non-metropolitan district	East Sussex	South East
246	Bromsgrove	101,973	Non-metropolitan district	Worcestershire	West Midlands
247	North Devon	101,281	Non-metropolitan district	Devon	South West
248	Great Yarmouth	100,957	Non-metropolitan district, borough	Norfolk	East of England
249	Burnley	100,946	Non-metropolitan district, borough	Lancashire	North West
250	South Holland	100,758	Non-metropolitan district	Lincolnshire	East Midlands
251	Pendle	100,203	Non-metropolitan district, borough	Lancashire	North West
252	West Lindsey	99,716	Non-metropolitan district	Lincolnshire	East Midlands
253	Hartlepool	99,656	Unitary authority, borough	Durham	North East
254	Harlow	98,543	Non-metropolitan district	Essex	East of England
255	Babergh	97,833	Non-metropolitan district	Suffolk	East of England
256	Staffordshire Moorlands	96,764	Non-metropolitan district	Staffordshire	West Midlands
257	Uttlesford	96,762	Non-metropolitan district	Essex	East of England
258	Rother	96,150	Non-metropolitan district	East Sussex	South East
259	Three Rivers	96,068	Non-metropolitan district	Hertfordshire	East of England
260	Surrey Heath	95,094	Non-metropolitan district, borough	Surrey	South East
261	East Cambridgeshire	94,599	Non-metropolitan district	Cambridgeshire	East of England
262	South Hams	93,171	Non-metropolitan district	Devon	South West
263	Runnymede	93,013	Non-metropolitan district, borough	Surrey	South East
264	Stevenage	92,081	Non-metropolitan district, borough	Hertfordshire	East of England
265	High Peak	91,676	Non-metropolitan district, borough	Derbyshire	East Midlands
266	Cotswold	91,563	Non-metropolitan district	Gloucestershire	South West
267	Hastings	90,855	Non-metropolitan district, borough	East Sussex	South East
268	Rochford	90,760	Non-metropolitan district	Essex	East of England
269	Castle Point	90,613	Non-metropolitan district, borough	Essex	East of England
270	Tandridge	90,322	Non-metropolitan district	Surrey	South East
271	Forest of Dean	90,157	Non-metropolitan district	Gloucestershire	South West
272	Mole Valley	88,808	Non-metropolitan district	Surrey	South East
273	Redditch	87,548	Non-metropolitan district, borough	Worcestershire	West Midlands
274	Hyndburn	86,908	Non-metropolitan district, borough	Lancashire	North West
275	Fylde	86,689	Non-metropolitan district, borough	Lancashire	North West
276	Mid Devon	85,593	Non-metropolitan district	Devon	South West
277	Bolsover	84,397	Non-metropolitan district	Derbyshire	East Midlands
278	Malvern Hills	84,380	Non-metropolitan district	Worcestershire	West Midlands
279	Epsom and Ewell	83,370	Non-metropolitan district, borough	Surrey	South East
280	Gosport	82,618	Non-metropolitan district, borough	Hampshire	South East
281	Tamworth	81,392	Non-metropolitan district, borough	Staffordshire	West Midlands
282	Brentwood	80,104	Non-metropolitan district, borough	Essex	East of England
283	Rossendale	73,688	Non-metropolitan district, borough	Lancashire	North West
284	Boston	72,092	Non-metropolitan district, borough	Lincolnshire	East Midlands
285	Derbyshire Dales	72,028	Non-metropolitan district	Derbyshire	East Midlands
286	Torridge	70,378	Non-metropolitan district	Devon	South West
287	Maldon	70,196	Non-metropolitan district	Essex	East of England
288	North Warwickshire	67,688	Non-metropolitan district, borough	Warwickshire	West Midlands
289	Ribble Valley	66,938	Non-metropolitan district, borough	Lancashire	North West
290	Adur	64,802	Non-metropolitan district	West Sussex	South East
291	Oadby and Wigston	61,533	Non-metropolitan district, borough	Leicestershire	East Midlands
292	West Devon	58,980	Non-metropolitan district, borough	Devon	South West
293	Melton	54,694	Non-metropolitan district, borough	Leicestershire	East Midlands
294	Rutland	41,629	Unitary authority	Rutland	East Midlands
295	City of London	15,631	Sui generis, city (TI)	City of London	London
296	Isles of Scilly	2,299	Sui generis	Cornwall	South West

== See also ==
- List of two-tier counties of England by population
- List of ceremonial counties of England by population
- List of towns and cities in England by population
- List of English districts
- List of English districts by area
- List of English districts by population density
- List of English districts by ethnicity
