= List of English districts by area =

This is a list of the 296 districts of England ordered by area, according to Standard Area Measurements published by the Office for National Statistics. The area is defined as 'area to mean high water excluding inland water'.

The list consists of 164 non-metropolitan districts, 32 London boroughs, 36 metropolitan boroughs, 62 unitary authorities, and two sui generis authorities (the City of London and the Isles of Scilly).

Local authority districts of England by area (2025)
Rank	District	Land area (km^{2})	Land area (mi^{2})	Type	Ceremonial county	Region
1	North Yorkshire	8,037	3,103	Unitary authority	North Yorkshire	Yorkshire and the Humber
2	Northumberland	5,020	1,940	Unitary authority	Northumberland	North East
3	Westmorland and Furness	3,756	1,450	Unitary authority	Cumbria	North West
4	Cornwall	3,545	1,369	Unitary authority	Cornwall	South West
5	Somerset	3,450	1,330	Unitary authority	Somerset	South West
6	Wiltshire	3,255	1,257	Unitary authority	Wiltshire	South West
7	Shropshire	3,197	1,234	Unitary authority	Shropshire	West Midlands
8	Cumberland	3,012	1,163	Unitary authority	Cumbria	North West
9	Dorset	2,491	962	Unitary authority	Dorset	South West
10	East Riding of Yorkshire	2,404	928	Unitary authority	East Riding of Yorkshire	Yorkshire and the Humber
11	County Durham	2,226	859	Unitary authority	Durham	North East
12	Herefordshire	2,180	840	Unitary authority	Herefordshire	West Midlands
13	East Lindsey	1,767	682	Non-metropolitan district	Lincolnshire	East Midlands
14	Buckinghamshire	1,565	604	Unitary authority	Buckinghamshire	South East
15	King's Lynn and West Norfolk	1,440	560	Non-metropolitan district, borough	Norfolk	East of England
16	West Northamptonshire	1,377	532	Unitary authority	Northamptonshire	East Midlands
17	Breckland	1,305	504	Non-metropolitan district	Norfolk	East of England
18	East Suffolk	1,261	487	Non-metropolitan district	Suffolk	East of England
19	Cheshire East	1,166	450	Unitary authority, borough	Cheshire	North West
20	Cotswold	1,164	449	Non-metropolitan district	Gloucestershire	South West
21	West Devon	1,160	450	Non-metropolitan district, borough	Devon	South West
22	West Lindsey	1,156	446	Non-metropolitan district	Lincolnshire	East Midlands
23	North Devon	1,086	419	Non-metropolitan district	Devon	South West
24	West Suffolk	1,035	400	Non-metropolitan district	Suffolk	East of England
25	North Northamptonshire	987	381	Unitary authority	Northamptonshire	East Midlands
26	Torridge	984	380	Non-metropolitan district	Devon	South West
27	Stratford-on-Avon	978	378	Non-metropolitan district	Warwickshire	West Midlands
28	North Norfolk	966	373	Non-metropolitan district	Norfolk	East of England
29	South Kesteven	943	364	Non-metropolitan district	Lincolnshire	East Midlands
30	North Kesteven	922	356	Non-metropolitan district	Lincolnshire	East Midlands
31	Cheshire West and Chester	920	360	Unitary authority, borough	Cheshire	North West
32	Mid Devon	913	353	Non-metropolitan district	Devon	South West
33	South Norfolk	908	351	Non-metropolitan district	Norfolk	East of England
34	Huntingdonshire	906	350	Non-metropolitan district	Cambridgeshire	East of England
35	South Cambridgeshire	902	348	Non-metropolitan district	Cambridgeshire	East of England
36	South Hams	887	342	Non-metropolitan district	Devon	South West
37	Mid Suffolk	871	336	Non-metropolitan district	Suffolk	East of England
38	North Lincolnshire	847	327	Unitary authority, borough	Lincolnshire	Yorkshire and the Humber
39	Wealden	833	322	Non-metropolitan district	East Sussex	South East
40	East Devon	814	314	Non-metropolitan district	Devon	South West
41	Derbyshire Dales	792	306	Non-metropolitan district	Derbyshire	East Midlands
42	Chichester	786	303	Non-metropolitan district	West Sussex	South East
43	New Forest	752	290	Non-metropolitan district	Hampshire	South East
44	South Holland	750	290	Non-metropolitan district	Lincolnshire	East Midlands
45	Central Bedfordshire	716	276	Unitary authority	Bedfordshire	East of England
46	West Oxfordshire	714	276	Non-metropolitan district	Oxfordshire	South East
47	West Berkshire	704	272	Unitary authority	Berkshire	South East
48	South Oxfordshire	679	262	Non-metropolitan district	Oxfordshire	South East
49	Teignbridge	674	260	Non-metropolitan district	Devon	South West
50	Wychavon	663	256	Non-metropolitan district	Worcestershire	West Midlands
51	Winchester	661	255	Non-metropolitan district, city (TI)	Hampshire	South East
52	Newark and Sherwood	651	251	Non-metropolitan district	Nottinghamshire	East Midlands
53	East Cambridgeshire	651	251	Non-metropolitan district	Cambridgeshire	East of England
54	Uttlesford	641	247	Non-metropolitan district	Essex	East of England
55	Bassetlaw	638	246	Non-metropolitan district	Nottinghamshire	East Midlands
56	Basingstoke and Deane	634	245	Non-metropolitan district, borough	Hampshire	South East
57	Test Valley	628	242	Non-metropolitan district, borough	Hampshire	South East
58	Braintree	612	236	Non-metropolitan district	Essex	East of England
59	Stafford	598	231	Non-metropolitan district	Staffordshire	West Midlands
60	Babergh	594	229	Non-metropolitan district	Suffolk	East of England
61	Harborough	592	229	Non-metropolitan district	Leicestershire	East Midlands
62	Cherwell	589	227	Non-metropolitan district	Oxfordshire	South East
63	Ribble Valley	583	225	Non-metropolitan district, borough	Lancashire	North West
64	Ashford	581	224	Non-metropolitan district, borough	Kent	South East
65	Vale of White Horse	578	223	Non-metropolitan district	Oxfordshire	South East
66	Malvern Hills	577	223	Non-metropolitan district	Worcestershire	West Midlands
67	Staffordshire Moorlands	576	222	Non-metropolitan district	Staffordshire	West Midlands
68	Doncaster	568	219	Metropolitan borough, city (2022)	South Yorkshire	Yorkshire and the Humber
69	Lancaster	567	219	Non-metropolitan district, city (1937)	Lancashire	North West
70	Broadland	552	213	Non-metropolitan district	Norfolk	East of England
71	Leeds	552	213	Metropolitan borough, city (1893)	West Yorkshire	Yorkshire and the Humber
72	Fenland	546	211	Non-metropolitan district	Cambridgeshire	East of England
73	High Peak	539	208	Non-metropolitan district, borough	Derbyshire	East Midlands
74	Horsham	530	200	Non-metropolitan district	West Sussex	South East
75	Forest of Dean	526	203	Non-metropolitan district	Gloucestershire	South West
76	East Hampshire	514	198	Non-metropolitan district	Hampshire	South East
77	Rother	509	197	Non-metropolitan district	East Sussex	South East
78	South Gloucestershire	497	192	Unitary authority	Gloucestershire	South West
79	Melton	481	186	Non-metropolitan district, borough	Leicestershire	East Midlands
80	Bedford	476	184	Unitary authority, borough	Bedfordshire	East of England
81	East Hertfordshire	476	184	Non-metropolitan district	Hertfordshire	East of England
82	Stroud	461	178	Non-metropolitan district	Gloucestershire	South West
83	Tewkesbury	414	160	Non-metropolitan district, borough	Gloucestershire	South West
84	Rushcliffe	409	158	Non-metropolitan district, borough	Nottinghamshire	East Midlands
85	Kirklees	409	158	Metropolitan borough	West Yorkshire	Yorkshire and the Humber
86	South Staffordshire	407	157	Non-metropolitan district	Staffordshire	West Midlands
87	Maidstone	393	152	Non-metropolitan district, borough	Kent	South East
88	East Staffordshire	387	149	Non-metropolitan district, borough	Staffordshire	West Midlands
89	Rutland	382	147	Unitary authority	Rutland	East Midlands
90	Isle of Wight	380	150	Unitary authority	Isle of Wight	South East
91	North Hertfordshire	375	145	Non-metropolitan district	Hertfordshire	East of England
92	North Somerset	374	144	Unitary authority	Somerset	South West
93	Swale	373	144	Non-metropolitan district, borough	Kent	South East
94	Sevenoaks	369	142	Non-metropolitan district	Kent	South East
95	Sheffield	368	142	Metropolitan borough, city (1893)	South Yorkshire	Yorkshire and the Humber
96	Bradford	366	141	Metropolitan borough, city (1897)	West Yorkshire	Yorkshire and the Humber
97	Boston	364	141	Non-metropolitan district, borough	Lincolnshire	East Midlands
98	Calderdale	364	141	Metropolitan borough	West Yorkshire	Yorkshire and the Humber
99	Maldon	358	138	Non-metropolitan district	Essex	East of England
100	Folkestone and Hythe	357	138	Non-metropolitan district	Kent	South East
101	Rugby	351	136	Non-metropolitan district, borough	Warwickshire	West Midlands
102	West Lancashire	347	134	Non-metropolitan district	Lancashire	North West
103	Bath and North East Somerset	346	134	Unitary authority	Somerset	South West
104	Waverley	345	133	Non-metropolitan district, borough	Surrey	South East
105	Peterborough	343	132	Unitary authority, city (1541)	Cambridgeshire	East of England
106	Epping Forest	339	131	Non-metropolitan district	Essex	East of England
107	Chelmsford	339	131	Non-metropolitan district, city (2012)	Essex	East of England
108	Wakefield	339	131	Metropolitan borough, city (1888)	West Yorkshire	Yorkshire and the Humber
109	South Derbyshire	338	131	Non-metropolitan district	Derbyshire	East Midlands
110	Tendring	336	130	Non-metropolitan district	Essex	East of England
111	Mid Sussex	334	129	Non-metropolitan district	West Sussex	South East
112	Tunbridge Wells	331	128	Non-metropolitan district, borough	Kent	South East
113	Lichfield	331	128	Non-metropolitan district	Staffordshire	West Midlands
114	Barnsley	329	127	Metropolitan borough	South Yorkshire	Yorkshire and the Humber
115	Colchester	328	127	Non-metropolitan district, borough, city (2022)	Essex	East of England
116	Dover	315	122	Non-metropolitan district	Kent	South East
117	Canterbury	309	119	Non-metropolitan district, city (TI)	Kent	South East
118	Milton Keynes	309	119	Unitary authority, borough, city (2022)	Buckinghamshire	South East
119	Hinckley and Bosworth	297	115	Non-metropolitan district, borough	Leicestershire	East Midlands
120	Lewes	292	113	Non-metropolitan district	East Sussex	South East
121	Telford and Wrekin	290	110	Unitary authority, borough	Shropshire	West Midlands
122	Rotherham	287	111	Metropolitan borough	South Yorkshire	Yorkshire and the Humber
123	North Warwickshire	284	110	Non-metropolitan district, borough	Warwickshire	West Midlands
124	Warwick	283	109	Non-metropolitan district	Warwickshire	West Midlands
125	Wyre	282	109	Non-metropolitan district, borough	Lancashire	North West
126	North West Leicestershire	279	108	Non-metropolitan district	Leicestershire	East Midlands
127	Charnwood	279	108	Non-metropolitan district, borough	Leicestershire	East Midlands
128	North East Derbyshire	276	107	Non-metropolitan district	Derbyshire	East Midlands
129	York	272	105	Unitary authority, city (TI)	North Yorkshire	Yorkshire and the Humber
130	Guildford	271	105	Non-metropolitan district, borough	Surrey	South East
131	Birmingham	268	103	Metropolitan borough, city (1889)	West Midlands	West Midlands
132	Amber Valley	265	102	Non-metropolitan district, borough	Derbyshire	East Midlands
133	Mole Valley	258	100	Non-metropolitan district	Surrey	South East
134	Tandridge	248	96	Non-metropolitan district	Surrey	South East
135	Redcar and Cleveland	245	95	Unitary authority, borough	North Yorkshire	North East
136	Tonbridge and Malling	240	93	Non-metropolitan district, borough	Kent	South East
137	Swindon	230	89	Unitary authority, borough	Wiltshire	South West
138	Arun	221	85	Non-metropolitan district	West Sussex	South East
139	Bromsgrove	217	84	Non-metropolitan district	Worcestershire	West Midlands
140	Hart	215	83	Non-metropolitan district	Hampshire	South East
141	Dacorum	212	82	Non-metropolitan district, borough	Hertfordshire	East of England
142	Newcastle-under-Lyme	211	81	Non-metropolitan district, borough	Staffordshire	West Midlands
143	Stockton-on-Tees	205	79	Unitary authority, borough	Durham and North Yorkshire	North East
144	Chorley	203	78	Non-metropolitan district, borough	Lancashire	North West
145	Darlington	197	76	Unitary authority, borough	Durham	North East
146	Windsor and Maidenhead	196	76	Unitary authority, royal borough	Berkshire	South East
147	Wyre Forest	195	75	Non-metropolitan district	Worcestershire	West Midlands
148	Medway	194	75	Unitary authority	Kent	South East
149	North East Lincolnshire	193	75	Unitary authority, borough	Lincolnshire	Yorkshire and the Humber
150	Wigan	188	73	Metropolitan borough	Greater Manchester	North West
151	Warrington	181	70	Unitary authority, borough	Cheshire	North West
152	Wokingham	179	69	Unitary authority	Berkshire	South East
153	Solihull	178	69	Metropolitan borough	West Midlands	West Midlands
154	Great Yarmouth	174	67	Non-metropolitan district, borough	Norfolk	East of England
155	Pendle	169	65	Non-metropolitan district, borough	Lancashire	North West
156	Rochford	167	64	Non-metropolitan district	Essex	East of England
157	Fylde	166	64	Non-metropolitan district, borough	Lancashire	North West
158	Thurrock	164	63	Unitary authority, borough	Essex	East of England
159	Bournemouth, Christchurch and Poole	162	63	Unitary authority	Dorset	South West
160	St Albans	161	62	Non-metropolitan district, city (1877)	Hertfordshire	East of England
161	Wirral	161	62	Metropolitan borough	Merseyside	North West
162	Bolsover	160	62	Non-metropolitan district	Derbyshire	East Midlands
163	Rochdale	158	61	Metropolitan borough	Greater Manchester	North West
164	Sefton	157	61	Metropolitan borough	Merseyside	North West
165	Brentwood	153	59	Non-metropolitan district, borough	Essex	East of England
166	Bromley	150	58	London borough	Greater London	London
167	Oldham	142	55	Metropolitan borough	Greater Manchester	North West
168	Gateshead	142	55	Metropolitan borough	Tyne and Wear	North East
169	Preston	142	55	Non-metropolitan district, city (2002)	Lancashire	North West
170	Bolton	140	54	Metropolitan borough	Greater Manchester	North West
171	Rossendale	138	53	Non-metropolitan district, borough	Lancashire	North West
172	Sunderland	137	53	Metropolitan borough, city (1992)	Tyne and Wear	North East
173	Blackburn with Darwen	137	53	Unitary authority, borough	Lancashire	North West
174	St Helens	136	53	Metropolitan borough	Merseyside	North West
175	Blaby	130	50	Non-metropolitan district	Leicestershire	East Midlands
176	Welwyn Hatfield	130	50	Non-metropolitan district	Hertfordshire	East of England
177	Reigate and Banstead	129	50	Non-metropolitan district, borough	Surrey	South East
178	Stockport	126	49	Metropolitan borough	Greater Manchester	North West
179	Gedling	120	46	Non-metropolitan district, borough	Nottinghamshire	East Midlands
180	Hillingdon	116	45	London borough	Greater London	London
181	Manchester	116	45	Metropolitan borough, city (1853)	Greater Manchester	North West
182	Newcastle upon Tyne	113	44	Metropolitan borough, city (1882)	Tyne and Wear	North East
183	South Ribble	113	44	Non-metropolitan district, borough	Lancashire	North West
184	Havering	112	43	London borough	Greater London	London
185	Liverpool	112	43	Metropolitan borough, city (1880)	Merseyside	North West
186	Burnley	111	43	Non-metropolitan district, borough	Lancashire	North West
187	Basildon	110	42	Non-metropolitan district, borough	Essex	East of England
188	Bristol	110	42	Unitary authority, city (1542)	Bristol	South West
189	Erewash	110	42	Non-metropolitan district, borough	Derbyshire	East Midlands
190	Ashfield	110	42	Non-metropolitan district	Nottinghamshire	East Midlands
191	Bracknell Forest	109	42	Unitary authority, borough	Berkshire	South East
192	Trafford	106	41	Metropolitan borough	Greater Manchester	North West
193	Walsall	104	40	Metropolitan borough	West Midlands	West Midlands
194	Thanet	104	40	Non-metropolitan district	Kent	South East
195	Tameside	103	40	Metropolitan borough	Greater Manchester	North West
196	Hertsmere	101	39	Non-metropolitan district, borough	Hertfordshire	East of England
197	Bury	99	38	Metropolitan borough	Greater Manchester	North West
198	Gravesham	99	38	Non-metropolitan district, borough	Kent	South East
199	Coventry	99	38	Metropolitan borough, city (1345)	West Midlands	West Midlands
200	Dudley	98	38	Metropolitan borough	West Midlands	West Midlands
201	Salford	97	37	Metropolitan borough, city (1926)	Greater Manchester	North West
202	Surrey Heath	95	37	Non-metropolitan district, borough	Surrey	South East
203	Elmbridge	95	37	Non-metropolitan district, borough	Surrey	South East
204	Hartlepool	94	36	Unitary authority, borough	Durham	North East
205	Stoke-on-Trent	93	36	Unitary authority, city (1925)	Staffordshire	West Midlands
206	Three Rivers	89	34	Non-metropolitan district	Hertfordshire	East of England
207	Barnet	87	34	London borough	Greater London	London
208	Knowsley	87	34	Metropolitan borough	Merseyside	North West
209	Croydon	86	33	London borough	Greater London	London
210	Sandwell	86	33	Metropolitan borough	West Midlands	West Midlands
211	Brighton and Hove	83	32	Unitary authority, city (2000)	East Sussex	South East
212	North Tyneside	82	32	Metropolitan borough	Tyne and Wear	North East
213	Enfield	81	31	London borough	Greater London	London
214	Broxtowe	80	31	Non-metropolitan district, borough	Nottinghamshire	East Midlands
215	Plymouth	80	31	Unitary authority, city (1928)	Devon	South West
216	Eastleigh	80	31	Non-metropolitan district, borough	Hampshire	South East
217	Halton	79	31	Unitary authority, borough	Cheshire	North West
218	Nuneaton and Bedworth	79	31	Non-metropolitan district, borough	Warwickshire	West Midlands
219	Cannock Chase	79	31	Non-metropolitan district	Staffordshire	West Midlands
220	Runnymede	78	30	Non-metropolitan district, borough	Surrey	South East
221	Derby	78	30	Unitary authority, city (1977)	Derbyshire	East Midlands
222	Mansfield	77	30	Non-metropolitan district	Nottinghamshire	East Midlands
223	Nottingham	75	29	Unitary authority, city (1897)	Nottinghamshire	East Midlands
224	Fareham	74	29	Non-metropolitan district, borough	Hampshire	South East
225	Leicester	73	28	Unitary authority, city (1919)	Leicestershire	East Midlands
226	Hyndburn	73	28	Non-metropolitan district, borough	Lancashire	North West
227	Dartford	73	28	Non-metropolitan district, borough	Kent	South East
228	Kingston upon Hull	72	28	Unitary authority, city (1299)	East Riding of Yorkshire	Yorkshire and the Humber
229	Wolverhampton	69	27	Metropolitan borough, city (2000)	West Midlands	West Midlands
230	Chesterfield	66	25	Non-metropolitan district, borough	Derbyshire	East Midlands
231	South Tyneside	64	25	Metropolitan borough	Tyne and Wear	North East
232	Woking	64	25	Non-metropolitan district, borough	Surrey	South East
233	Torbay	63	24	Unitary authority, borough	Devon	South West
234	Bexley	61	24	London borough	Greater London	London
235	Richmond upon Thames	57	22	London borough	Greater London	London
236	Redbridge	56	22	London borough	Greater London	London
237	Hounslow	56	22	London borough	Greater London	London
238	Havant	56	22	Non-metropolitan district, borough	Hampshire	South East
239	Ealing	56	22	London borough	Greater London	London
240	Redditch	54	21	Non-metropolitan district, borough	Worcestershire	West Midlands
241	Middlesbrough	54	21	Unitary authority, borough	North Yorkshire	North East
242	Broxbourne	51	20	Non-metropolitan district, borough	Hertfordshire	East of England
243	Harrow	50	19	London borough	Greater London	London
244	Southampton	50	19	Unitary authority, city (1964)	Hampshire	South East
245	Greenwich	47	18	London borough, royal borough	Greater London	London
246	Exeter	47	18	Non-metropolitan district, city (TI)	Devon	South West
247	Cheltenham	47	18	Non-metropolitan district, borough	Gloucestershire	South West
248	Oxford	46	18	Non-metropolitan district, city (1542)	Oxfordshire	South East
249	Crawley	45	17	Non-metropolitan district, borough	West Sussex	South East
250	Spelthorne	45	17	Non-metropolitan district, borough	Surrey	South East
251	Castle Point	45	17	Non-metropolitan district, borough	Essex	East of England
252	Eastbourne	44	17	Non-metropolitan district, borough	East Sussex	South East
253	Sutton	44	17	London borough	Greater London	London
254	Luton	43	17	Unitary authority, borough	Bedfordshire	East of England
255	Brent	43	17	London borough	Greater London	London
256	Adur	42	16	Non-metropolitan district	West Sussex	South East
257	Southend-on-Sea	42	16	Unitary authority, borough, city (2022)	Essex	East of England
258	Cambridge	41	16	Non-metropolitan district, city (1951)	Cambridgeshire	East of England
259	Gloucester	41	16	Non-metropolitan district, city (1541)	Gloucestershire	South West
260	Reading	40	15	Unitary authority, borough	Berkshire	South East
261	Portsmouth	40	15	Unitary authority, city (1926)	Hampshire	South East
262	Ipswich	40	15	Non-metropolitan district, borough	Suffolk	East of England
263	Rushmoor	39	15	Non-metropolitan district, borough	Hampshire	South East
264	Norwich	39	15	Non-metropolitan district, city (1195)	Norfolk	East of England
265	Waltham Forest	39	15	London borough	Greater London	London
266	Merton	38	15	London borough	Greater London	London
267	Kingston upon Thames	37	14	London borough, royal borough	Greater London	London
268	Newham	36	14	London borough	Greater London	London
269	Barking and Dagenham	36	14	London borough	Greater London	London
270	Lincoln	36	14	Non-metropolitan district, city (TI)	Lincolnshire	East Midlands
271	Lewisham	35	14	London borough	Greater London	London
272	Blackpool	35	14	Unitary authority, borough	Lancashire	North West
273	Wandsworth	34	13	London borough	Greater London	London
274	Epsom and Ewell	34	13	Non-metropolitan district, borough	Surrey	South East
275	Worcester	33	13	Non-metropolitan district, city (1189)	Worcestershire	West Midlands
276	Slough	33	13	Unitary authority, borough	Berkshire	South East
277	Worthing	33	13	Non-metropolitan district, borough	West Sussex	South East
278	Tamworth	31	12	Non-metropolitan district, borough	Staffordshire	West Midlands
279	Harlow	31	12	Non-metropolitan district	Essex	East of England
280	Hastings	30	12	Non-metropolitan district, borough	East Sussex	South East
281	Haringey	30	12	London borough	Greater London	London
282	Southwark	29	11	London borough	Greater London	London
283	Lambeth	27	10	London borough	Greater London	London
284	Stevenage	26	10	Non-metropolitan district, borough	Hertfordshire	East of England
285	Gosport	25	9.7	Non-metropolitan district, borough	Hampshire	South East
286	Oadby and Wigston	24	9.3	Non-metropolitan district, borough	Leicestershire	East Midlands
287	Camden	22	8.5	London borough	Greater London	London
288	Westminster	21	8.1	London borough, city (1540)	Greater London	London
289	Watford	21	8.1	Non-metropolitan district, borough	Hertfordshire	East of England
290	Tower Hamlets	20	7.7	London borough	Greater London	London
291	Hackney	19	7.3	London borough	Greater London	London
292	Hammersmith and Fulham	16	6.2	London borough	Greater London	London
293	Isles of Scilly	16	6.2	Sui generis	Cornwall	South West
294	Islington	15	5.8	London borough	Greater London	London
295	Kensington and Chelsea	12	4.6	London borough, royal borough	Greater London	London
296	City of London	2.89	1.2	Sui generis, city (TI)	City of London	London

== See also ==
- List of English districts
- List of English districts by population
- List of English districts by population density
- List of English districts by ethnicity
