= Buckinghamshire (district) =

Unitary authority area in England

- Non-metropolitan county
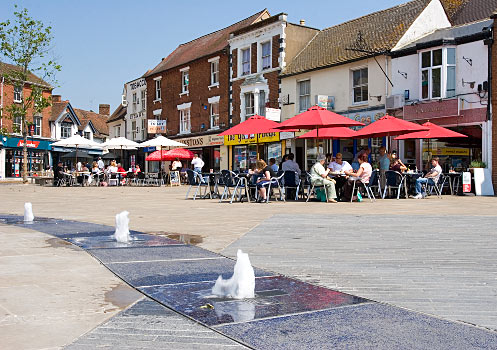
- Kingsbury Square in Aylesbury, the county town

- Shown within the ceremonial county of Buckinghamshire

- Location within England Location within the United Kingdom Buckinghamshire (Europe)
- Sovereign state: United Kingdom
- Country: England
- Region: South East
- Ceremonial county: Buckinghamshire
- Unitary Authority: 1 April 2020
- Seat: Aylesbury

Government
  - Type: Unitary authority
  - Local Authority: Buckinghamshire Council
  - Leadership: Leader and cabinet

Area
  - Total: 604 sq mi (1,565 km^{2})
  - Rank: 14th

Population (2024)
  - Total: 578,772
  - Rank: 8th
  - Density: 957.8/sq mi (369.8/km^{2})
  - Rank: 202nd
- Time zone: UTC+0 (Greenwich Mean Time)
  - Summer (DST): UTC+1 (British Summer Time)
- ISO 3166-2: GB-BKM
- ONS code: E06000060 (GSS)
- Website: Council website

Buckinghamshire is a unitary authority area in the ceremonial county of Buckinghamshire, England. It covers about four-fifths of area of the ceremonial county and about two-thirds of its population; the City of Milton Keynes accounts for the remainder. As a unitary authority area, it is both a non-metropolitan county and a non-metropolitan district.

The district is administered by Buckinghamshire Council. The council was formed in 2020, following the abolition of the previous county council, Buckinghamshire County Council, and the four district councils covering the area.

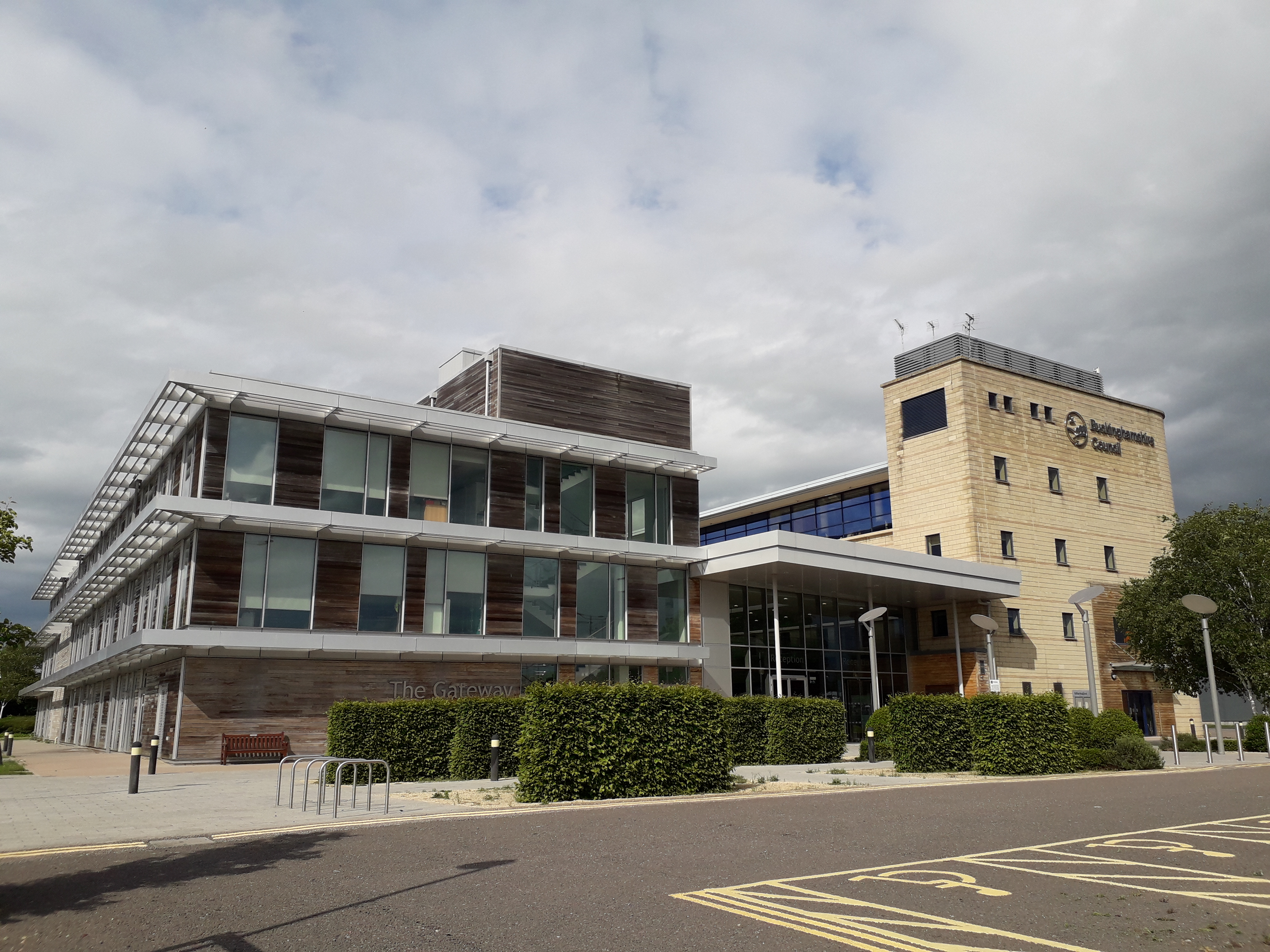
The Gateway, the district administrative centre in Aylesbury

== History ==
The non-metropolitan county became a unitary authority area on 1 April 2020, following the merger of four boroughs and districts Aylesbury Vale, Chiltern, South Bucks and Wycombe as part of the 2019–2023 structural changes to local government in England.

== Main settlements ==
- Amersham
- Aylesbury
- Beaconsfield
- Buckingham
- Burnham
- Chesham
- High Wycombe
- Marlow
