= Demographics of Luton =

Statistics regarding ethnicity, religion and language in Luton, Bedfordshire, England

- Population pyramid of Luton
- Population: 225,261 (2021)
- Density: 4,696/km2 (12,160/sq mi) (2011)

Population density in the 2011 census in Luton

Luton, Bedfordshire, England is an ethnically and culturally diverse town of 203,201 people. It is primarily urban, with a population density of 4,696/km^{2} (12,160/sq mi). Luton has seen several waves of immigration. In the early part of the 20th century, there was immigration of Irish and Scottish people to the town. These were followed by Afro-Caribbean and Asian immigrants. More recently immigrants from other European Union countries have made Luton their home. As a result of this Luton has a diverse ethnic mix, with a significant population of Asian descent, mainly Pakistani 29,353 (14.4%) and Bangladeshi 13,606 (6.7%).

Since the 2011 census, Luton has had a white British population less than 50%, one of three towns in the United Kingdom along with Leicester and Slough. Luton has a majority white population, when non-British white people such as the Irish and Eastern Europeans are included. Identity wise, 81% of the population of Luton define themselves as British of any race.

Industry sectors of Luton over time

== Ethnicity ==
Luton ethnic demography from 1971 to 2021

Population pyramid of Luton by ethnicity in 2021

Ethnic makeup of Luton by single year ages in 2021

The following table shows the ethnic group of respondents for estimations for 1971 and in the 1991 to 2021 censuses in Luton.

There was likely 600 to 700 'coloured' people within Luton in 1958, around 300 of these being Afro-Caribbeans, 250 Pakistanis and 60 Indians.

Luton is a majority minority town in which no single ethnic group make up the majority of residents, however by broad multi-ethnic groups, Whites make up 54.7% of the population, a decline of 25.5% from 1991 when Whites made up 4 out of every 5 residents (80.2%). Asian British people have grown in proportional size, having gone from 14% in 1991 to nearly one third of the town's population (30%) in 2011. Black British residents have also increased from nearly 5% to nearly 10% in two decades as well as Mixed residents who have gone from 2.6% in 2001 to 4.1% in 2011.

Ethnic Group	1971 estimations		1981 estimations		1991 census		2001 census		2011 census		2021 census	
Ethnic Group	Number	%	Number	%	Number	%	Number	%	Number	%	Number	%
White: Total	148,061	93.3%	135,058	84.4%	139,554	79.9%	132,566	71.90%	111,079	54.66%	101,798	45.2%
White: British	–	–	–	–	–	–	119,793	64.97%	90,530	44.55%	71,532	31.8%
White: Irish	–	–	–	–	9,266	5.4%	8,569	4.65%	6,126	3.01%	4,570	2.0%
White: Gypsy or Irish Traveller (Note: New category created for the 2011 census)	–	–	–	–	–	–	–	–	198	0.10%	238	0.1%
White: Roma	–	–	–	–	–	–	–	–	–	–	808	0.4%
White: Other	–	–	–	–	–	–	4,204	2.28%	14,225	7.00%	24,650	10.9%
Asian or Asian British: Total	–	–	16,748	10.5%	24,849	14.2%	34,773	18.86%	60,952	30%	83,325	37.1%
Asian or Asian British: Indian	–	–	5723		7422		7,538	4.09%	10,625	5.23%	12,096	5.4%
Asian or Asian British: Pakistani	–	–	7,238		10,987		17,012	9.23%	29,353	14.45%	41,143	18.3%
Asian or Asian British: Bangladeshi	–	–	2,576		4,819		7,641	4.14%	13,606	6.70%	20,630	9.2%
Asian or Asian British: Chinese (Note: In 2001, listed under the 'Chinese or other ethnic group' heading.)	–	–	582		676		1,096	0.59%	1,497	0.74%	901	0.4%
Asian or Asian British: Other Asian	–	–	629		945		1,486	0.81%	5,871	2.89%	8,555	3.8%
Black or Black British: Total	–	–	6,963	4.3%	8,566	4.9%	11,684	6.34%	19,909	9.80%	22,735	10%
Black or Black British: African	–	–	497		634		3,204	1.74%	9,169	4.51%	11,774	5.2%
Black or Black British: Caribbean	–	–	5308		6420		7,653	4.15%	8,177	4.02%	8,216	3.6%
Black or Black British: Other Black	–	–	1158		1512		827	0.45%	2,563	1.26%	2,745	1.2%
Mixed: Total	–	–	–	–	–	–	4,728	2.56%	8,281	4.08%	9,620	4.3%
Mixed: White and Black Caribbean	–	–	–	–	–	–	2,414	1.31%	3,831	1.89%	3,486	1.5%
Mixed: White and Black African	–	–	–	–	–	–	389	0.21%	915	0.45%	1,268	0.6%
Mixed: White and Asian	–	–	–	–	–	–	1,058	0.57%	1,805	0.89%	2,429	1.1%
Mixed: Other Mixed	–	–	–	–	–	–	867	0.47%	1,730	0.85%	2,437	1.1%
Other: Total	–	–	1,232	0.8%	1,631	1%	620	0.34%	2,980	1.47%	7,783	3.4%
Other: Arab (Note: New category created for the 2011 census)	–	–	–	–	–	–	–	–	1,646	0.81%	2,106	0.9%
Other: Any other ethnic group	–	–	–	–	–	–	620	0.34%	1,334	0.66%	5,677	2.5%
Ethnic minority: Total	10,694	6.7%	24,943	15.6%	35,046	20.1%	51,805	28.1%	92,122	45.3%	123,463	54.8%
Total	158,755	100%	160,001	100%	174,600	100%	184,371	100%	203,201	100%	225,261	100%

=== Distribution ===
Distribution of ethnic groups according to the 2011 census in Luton
White

White-British

White-Irish

White-Other

Asian

Asian-Indian

Asian-Pakistani

Asian-Bangladeshi

Asian-Chinese

Black

Black-African

Black-Caribbean

Other-Arab

=== Ethnicity of school pupils ===
Luton's schools are majority-minority, that being no single ethnic group makes up the majority, the single largest group is British Pakistanis at 25.1% of the school pupil population and the largest multi-ethnic group being Asian British people at 47.4% in 2022, which was previous White's at 53.5% in 2004. The white White British population has declined from a near majority in 2004 at 49.5% to 17.2% in 2022. Black British people and Mixed people have also increased. However, other ethnicities have declined from a peak of 3.7% in 2016 to 2.2% in 2022.

Ethnic group	School year							
Ethnic group	1971		2004		2015/16		2021/2022	
Ethnic group	Number	%	Number	%	Number	%	Number	%
White: Total	–	92.7%	14,900	53.5%	7,285	29.4%	12,230	30.2%
White: British	–	–	13,780	49.5%	4,229	17.1%	6,972	17.2%
White: Irish	–	–	550		112		154	
White: Traveller of Irish heritage	–	–	40		34		44	
White: Gypsy/Roma	–	–	20		151		169	
White: Other	–	–	510		2,759		4,891	
Asian / Asian British: Total	–	–	8,140	29.3%	12,089	48.8%	19,185	47.4%
Asian / Asian British: Indian	–	–	950	3.4%	888	3.6%	1,571	3.9%
Asian / Asian British: Pakistani	–	–	4,090	14.7%	6,177	24.9%	10,163	25.1%
Asian / Asian British: Bangladeshi	–	–	2,080		149		4,998	
Asian / Asian British: Chinese	–	–	90		46		87	
Asian / Asian British: Other Asians	–	–	930		1,235		2,366	
Black / Black British: Total	–	–	2,510	9%	2,140	8.6%	3,995	9.9%
Black: Caribbean	–	–	1,320		327		1,013	
Black: African	–	–	950		1,653		2,613	
Black: Other Blacks	–	–	250		160		369	
Mixed / British Mixed	–	–	1,750	6.3%	2,105	8.5%	3,676	9.1%
Other: Total	–	–	170	0.6%	909	3.7%	890	2.2%
Unclassified	–	–	390		266		475	
Non-White: Total	–	7.3%						
Total:	–	100%	27,840	100%	24,794	100%	40,451	100%

== Country of birth ==
UK and foreign born population pyramid of Luton in 2021. Males and females representing the UK born population while foreign males and females representing the foreign born population.

== Languages ==
The most common main languages spoken in Luton according to the 2011 census are shown in the following table.

Rank	Language	Usual residents aged 3+	Proportion
1	English	153,463	79.43%
2	Urdu	8,567	4.43%
3	Polish	8,006	4.14%
4	Bengali	6,337	3.28%
5	Punjabi	2,203	1.14%
6	Gujarati	1,714	0.89%
7	Arabic	1,037	0.54%
8	Lithuanian	698	0.36%
9	Tamil	653	0.34%
10	Tagalog/Filipino	524	0.27%
11	Shona	489	0.25%
12	Hindi	484	0.25%
13	French	439	0.23%
14	Portuguese	397	0.21%
15	Slovak	352	0.18%
16	Italian	342	0.18%
17	Romanian	340	0.18%
18	Russian	324	0.17%
19	Malayalam	316	0.16%
20	Pashto	293	0.15%
	Other	6,217	3.22%

== Religion ==
Religious makeup of Luton by single year age groups in 2021

The following table shows the religion of respondents in the 2001, 2011 and 2021 censuses in Luton.

Religion	2001		2011		2021	
Religion	Number	%	Number	%	Number	%
Christian	109,973	59.65%	96,271	47.38%	85,297	37.87%
Buddhist	456	0.25%	652	0.32%	664	0.3%
Hindu	5,025	2.73%	6,749	3.32%	7,438	3.30%
Jewish	534	0.29%	326	0.16%	246	0.1%
Muslim	26,963	14.62%	49,991	24.60%	74,191	32.94%
Sikh	1,487	0.81%	2,347	1.16%	3,032	1.35%
Other religion	642	0.35%	898	0.44%	1,115	0.5%
No religion	25,960	14.08%	33,594	16.53%	39,580	17.57%
Religion not stated	13,331	7.23%	12,373	6.09%	13,697	6.08%
Total	184,371	100.00%	203,201	100.00%	225,262	100.0

=== Distribution ===
Distribution of religions according to the 2011 census in Luton
Christianity

Islam

Judaism

Hinduism

Sikhism

Buddhism

Other religion

No religion

== See also ==
- Demographics of the United Kingdom
- Demographics of England
- Demographics of London
- Demographics of Birmingham
- Demographics of Greater Manchester
- List of English cities by population
- List of English districts by population
- List of English districts and their ethnic composition
- List of English districts by area
- List of English districts by population density
