= Majority minority =

Term used to refer to a subdivision

A majority-minority or minority-majority area is a term used to refer to a subdivision in which one or more racial, ethnic, and/or religious minorities (relative to the whole country's population) make up a majority of the local population.

== Terminology ==
The exact terminology used differs from place to place and language to language. In many large, contiguous countries like China or the United Kingdom, a minority population (for the whole state) is often the majority in a subdivision. For example, Tibetan people are the majority in the Tibet Autonomous Region and Scottish people are the majority in Scotland. The demographics in these regions are generally the result of historical population distributions, not because of recent immigration or recent differences in birth and fertility rates between various groups. As a result, it is rare for a Chinese autonomous region or a British home nation to be described as 'majority minority', even though they would fit the definition.

== Background ==
Majority minority areas exist in two main forms. One form is when a homogeneous grouping residing within an area make up a majority of the local population. This grouping would otherwise be a minority in the broader jurisdiction. The other type occurs when several disparate groupings, when counted together, form a percentage-share majority of the local population, outnumbering the historically dominant group as a composite of diverse minority groups.

Whether distinctions between groups are religious, ethnic, linguistic or racial; these different forms of majority-minority scenarios, or areas, tend to contribute towards different socio-political and cultural environments. For example, a study of the 2006 European Social Survey found that people of localized majority-minority status across 21 EU countries were more supportive of stronger political European integration than existing national native majorities, and a 2019 Pew Research Center study found that 46 percent of white Americans believed national majority-minority demography would negatively impact American culture.

There has also been study on groupings said to have 'old' and 'new' majority-minority status in specific areas. In research funded by the EU's Framework Programmes, a 2015 study explored this difference, finding that, for example, ethnic Austrians living in South Tyrol manifest a culture which tends to oblige ethnic Italians to learn the German language for advancement in the province, such as access to the administration of local government. This was contrasted with 'new' immigration-derived majority-minority populaces in Europe.

== Schools ==
In the United States, the vast majority of African Americans and Hispanic and Latino Americans attend schools where white Americans are in the minority. 2006 research from The Civil Rights Project found that, on average, white students attend schools that are 78% white, while black and Hispanic students attend schools which are 29% white. A study on this suggested that; "This data is important because "majority minority" schools have the worst facilities (buildings, labs, libraries, athletic facilities), the least qualified teachers, the worst overcrowding, and the least financial support." In regards to racial classification at a national level, public schools in the US obtained majority minority status in 2014. At the university level, Harvard University's first case of a majority-minority freshman class was reported in 2017.

In the Netherlands, majority-minority schools emerged in the post-war period, starting as a phenomenon in Amsterdam with immigration from Suriname and from Curaçao, right after World War II. In the 1970 and 80s, second-generation black Dutch students with ancestry from the Netherlands Antilles, were joined in classes by the children of workers emigrating from Turkey and Morocco, creating ethnic Dutch minorities in some schools within the country's capital. In a 2020 study of school classes in European cities, research on Turks in Austria and Belgium found that "a 'majority minority' school environment may empower minority group members so that relative numbers would protect them from becoming the target of discrimination."

== Observation by settlement ==
=== Towns and cities ===
Many cities in North America have majority-minority scenarios (based upon racial classifications in the US census and the census in Canada). Since the late 20th century, areas of Northern and Western Europe have been undergoing demographic transformation resulting in majority minority cities. A 2018 study in Frontiers in Psychology analyzed:

In the United States and Canada racial minorities already comprise a larger share of the population than Whites in dozens of major cities (e.g., Vancouver and New York). These cities have been dubbed majority-minority areas—or places where the racial/ethnic majority comprise less than half the population (Frey, 2011; Jedwab, 2016). Western Europe is also becoming more diverse, albeit more slowly (Browne, 2000). London, England is one of the few major European cities that has been designated a majority–minority area.

Based upon the UK's Office for National Statistics racial or ethnic categorization, demographic research suggests that Leicester and Birmingham will each join London in majority minority status in the 2020s. University of Antwerp's professor Dirk Geldof, writing in 2016, noted that "within a matter of years, Antwerp will also become a majority-minority city, as will many other European cities." An education inclusion project at Hague University published that; "In superdiverse cities like Paris, The Hague and Brussels there is no majority anymore. These are so-called majority minority cities". According to a study at the European Commission's research repository CORDIS:

In cities like Amsterdam, now only one in three youngsters under age fifteen is of native descent. This situation, referred to as a majority-minority context, is a new phenomenon in Western Europe and it presents itself as one of the most important societal and psychological transformations of our time.

In the course of two generations places in Northwestern Europe, such as Amsterdam and Brussels, have become majority minority, with ethnic Dutch, Flemings and Walloons, respectively, representing less than 50 percent of the population of the capitals.

=== States and regions ===
In 2010, the BBC reported that "America's two largest states - California and Texas - became "majority-minority" states (with an overall minority population outnumbering the white majority) in 1998 and 2004 respectively." Demographers Dudley L. Poston Jr. and Rogelio Sáenz have noted how "nonwhites account for more than half of the populations of Hawaii, the District of Columbia, California, New Mexico, Texas and Nevada. In the next 10 to 15 years, these half-dozen “majority-minority” states will likely be joined by as many as eight other states where whites now make up less than 60 percent of the population."

In Europe, various national medias report on the social situation in the French suburbs with regards to disproportionate poverty and unrest. Known as banlieues, these outer-city regions across France are often majority-minority areas, in terms of race or ethnicity in relation to the ethnic French.

=== Nations and countries ===
The meaning of "majority-minority" or "minority-majority", in relation to a whole country, is not well defined and may not be consistent between different users of the terms. A multitude of scholars have designated countries, or sovereign states, particularly in the developed or Western world, which are projected to obtain majority-minority demography between 2040 and 2050. This includes the United States, Canada and New Zealand, with Australia, and nations in Western Europe, estimated to follow this trend toward the end of the century. In this usage, "majority-minority" usually means that a previously majority group becomes a plurality group, less than 50% of the population but still larger than any other group. Occasionally, it may mean a change of the majority group, with the previously majority group becoming a minority group and a previously minority group becoming the new majority group.

This will not be the first time that the status of majority ethnic group has changed in these countries: it is estimated that Australia became a "majority-minority" country in the 1840s, when arriving Europeans first outnumbered Indigenous Australians. New Zealand became "majority-minority" slightly later, with non-Māori first outnumbering the Māori population around 1858. David Coleman has studied a similar statistical projection in Britain. Coleman, a professor of demography at the University of Oxford, estimates that by 2060 the United Kingdom will reach majority-minority status (where the "white British" ethnic group is taken to be the current "majority", excluding "white Irish", "other white" and "mixed" groups).

In the developing world, the South American nation of Brazil has been described as a majority-minority country. This is with regards to white Brazilians being the historically largest group, and while remaining culturally dominant, have since become a national minority.

== Distinctions between groups ==
There are multiple axis points of difference, and distinction, between groupings of people that can contribute towards the attribution of majority-minority status upon a particular area or within a societal scenario. With cultural, linguistic or religious differences, there is usually a corresponding difference in ethnicity, whether related in a central or peripheral way, to said distinctions. For instance, there are examples of this throughout Europe. Where racial distinctions are made, this is most often in relation to white people, and most usually in European nations or nations derived from European colonialism, such as Brazil or the United States. Other countries, such as Australia, do not collect statistics based on racial categories such as "white people" or "black people", preferring to categorise ancestries by reference to self-identified country of ancestral origin, such as "English", "German" or "Australian".

=== Cultural and linguistic ===
Where religion does not significantly influence designations of majority minority labels, certain cultural and linguistic differences may be emphasized in that particular society, such as in South Tyrol. Whereas the majority of residents in the northern Italian province are ethnic Austrians and speak the German language (in comparison with the Italian-speaking ethnic Italian majority of the broader nation), the population's adherence to Roman Catholicism is similar to the rest of the country.

=== Ethnic ===
Kosovo has a history of being a majority-minority area via the historic borders of Serbia in the 20th century, and prior to its independence declaration. While this phenomenon may predominantly be observed to be ethnicity-based (upon distinctions between ethnic Albanians and ethnic Serbs), contributing factors involve the Islamic religiosity of Albanians and Christianity of Serbians, as well as the ethno-linguistic considerations of the Albanian language and Serbian language.

=== Racial ===
When majority minority status is designated or predicted in terms of racial groups, many scholarly and journalistic works make this distinction with reference to white people. Based upon nation-based racial classifications, academics Eric Kaufmann and Matthew Goodwin have suggested that white people will be minorities in the United States, Canada and New Zealand, in what they define as "the ‘majority-minority’ point", by approximately 2050.

=== Religious ===
While majority-minority status for Catholics in areas of Northern Ireland, in contrast with historical Protestant majorities across the territory as a whole, can be described to be based on religion; there are ethno-linguistic factors (such as Irish-speaking Catholics and English-speaking Protestants), as well as broader overlapping factors of ethnicity (Catholic Gaels and Protestant people of mainly English, Scottish and Huguenot descent) which can contribute toward religiously defined majority minority attribution.

== Regions ==
=== Africa ===
==== South Africa ====
Whites as a percentage of the population in various parts of South Africa in 2011: 0–20% 20–40% 40–60% 60–80% 80–100%

- Whites and Coloureds are a majority in some parts of South Africa while being a minority in South Africa overall.

=== Asia ===
==== Azerbaijan ====
- Azeris are a minority in several parts/areas of Azerbaijan.

==== East Timor ====
- The vast majority (around 96%) of East Timor's population practice Catholicism, owing to Portuguese influence, but on the island of Atauro, Protestants make up the majority due to Dutch influence.

==== Georgia ====
- The Georgian province of Samtskhe-Javakheti has an Armenian majority, while the Georgian province of Kvemo Kartli has an Azeri plurality. No ethnic group composed a majority of the population in Abkhazia from at least 2003 until around 2011.

==== India ====
The Muslim population in various parts of India in 2011

- Muslims are a majority in the Lakshadweep and Jammu and Kashmir states/territories of India, and in some other districts of India. However, Muslims are a minority in India overall.
- Christians currently make up the majority of the Northeast Indian states of Nagaland at 90%, Mizoram at 88% and Meghalaya at 83.3%, although Christians do not even make up more than 3% of India's total population.
- Sikhs make the majority of state of Punjab, although once again they do not form a majority in India overall.
- In the Northeast Indian state of Arunachal Pradesh, no religious or ethnic group constitutes more than 30% of its population, owing to the state's great cultural diversity.

==== Indonesia ====
- Indonesia is the world's most populous Muslim country, with Islam being practiced by around 88% of the population, or over 200 million people. Despite this there are several areas of Indonesia where Muslims are the minority:
  - 84% of the population of Bali practice a form of Hinduism called Balinese Hinduism, although Hindus only form 1.7% of Indonesia's overall population.
  - Catholics form the majority of East Nusa Tenggara at 51%, although Catholics only form about 3% of Indonesia's overall population.
  - Protestants form the majority in three Indonesian provinces: West Papua at 60%, Papua at 68%, and North Sulawesi at 64%. Overall though Protestants only form about 7% of Indonesia's population.
- Several neighborhoods and communities in major Indonesian cities such as Jakarta, Batam, Pontianak, Singkawang, Medan and Bagansiapiapi are of predominantly of Chinese origin, although people of Chinese descent do not form more than 10% in any of these cities overall population and only form about 1-2% of Indonesia's overall population.

==== Israel ====
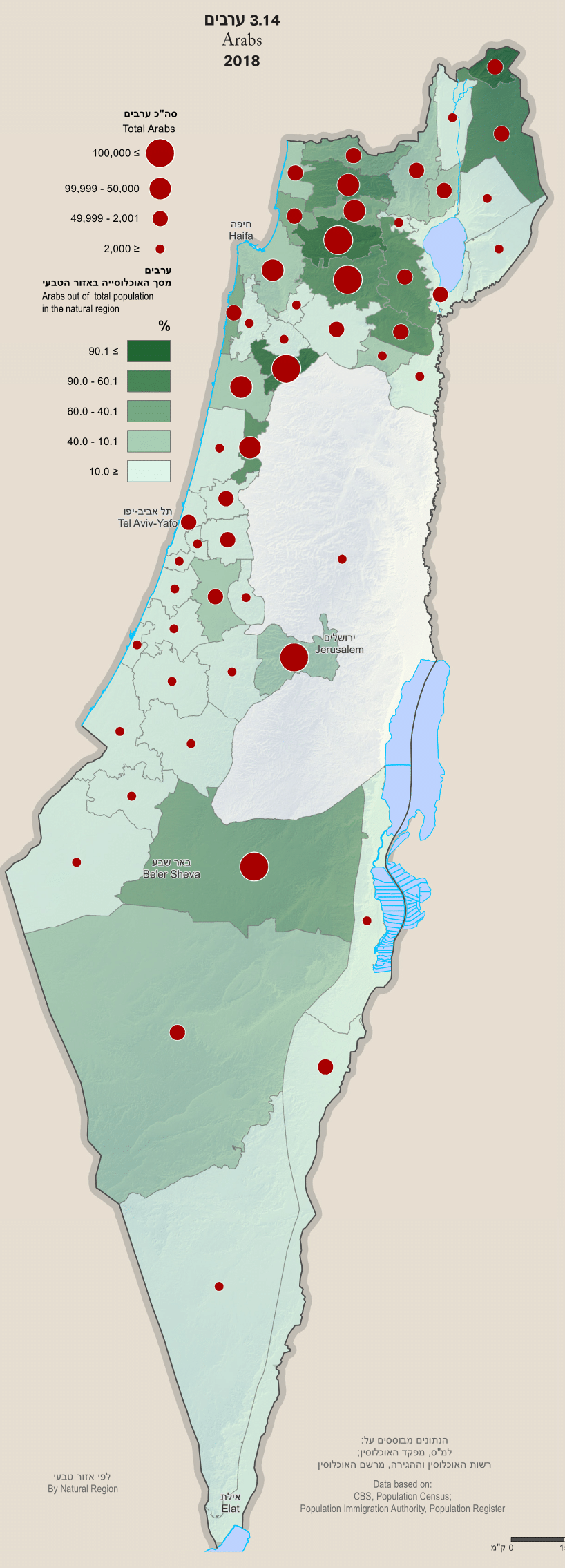
Arabs in Israel, by natural region, 2018

- Arabs are a majority of the population in Israel's Northern District and in several other smaller parts of Israel.
- Non-Haredi Jews are projected to become a minority of Israel's total population by 2059.

==== Kazakhstan ====
- The Kazakh SSR did not have any ethnic group/nationality comprise a majority between 1933 and 1997. Based on the 2009 census and annual estimates thereafter, some regions of Kazakhstan still did not have a Kazakh majority as of 2018.

==== Kyrgyzstan ====
- The Kirgiz SSR did not have any ethnic group/nationality comprise a majority between 1941 and 1985.

==== Malaysia ====
As of 2020, 45% of Penang's population belonged to the Chinese ethnic group, making ethnic Malays a minority within the state.

==== Mongolia ====
- Kazakh-speaking Muslims make up around 93% of Mongolia's Bayan-Ölgii Province, although they make up only about 3–5% of the overall population.

==== Philippines ====
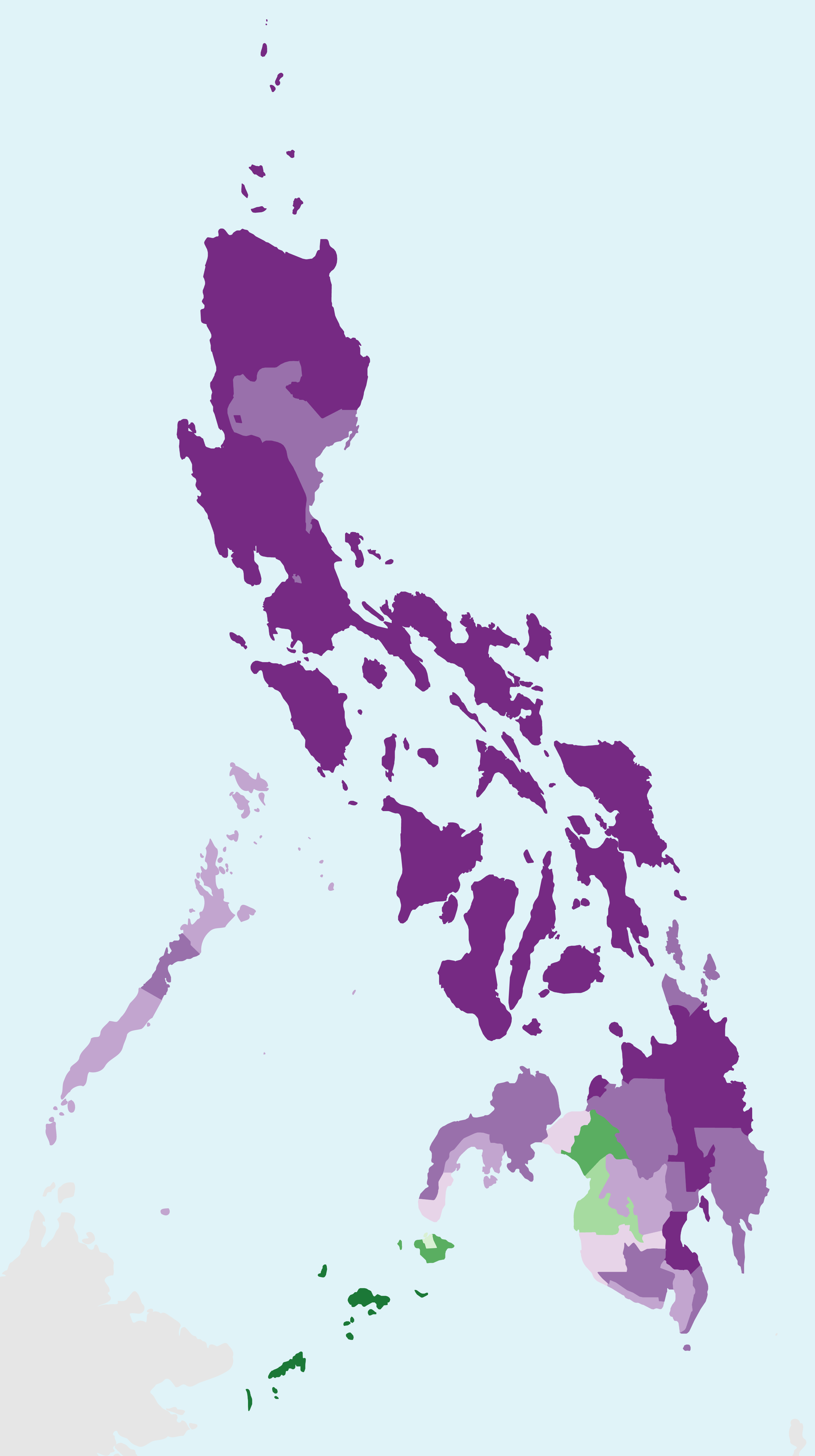
Religion in the Philippines according to the 2020 census. Muslims form a majority across green-shaded provinces.

- Muslims make up around 6.4% of the total Philippine population. However, they are practiced by the majority of inhabitants in the region of Bangsamoro (Basilan, Lanao del Sur, Maguindanao del Norte, Maguindanao del Sur, Sulu, and Tawi-Tawi, as well as parts of Palawan and Zamboanga Peninsula.

==== Singapore ====
- Several neighborhoods in the city-state are home to Malay and Indian majorities.

==== Sri Lanka ====
- The Sinhalese are a minority in the Northern and Eastern Provinces of Sri Lanka, and are a plurality in the capital city, Colombo.
  - Conversely, the Sri Lankan Tamils are the majority in the Northern Province at 93% and a plurality in the Eastern Province at 39%, however they only form 11% of Sri Lanka's overall population.

==== Thailand ====
Malay Muslims form the majority in some of Thailand's southern provinces.

- Malay-speaking Muslims make up the majority in several of Thailand's southern provinces (Narathiwat, Pattani, Yala, Songkhla, and Satun).

=== Europe ===
Albania

• Macedonians are a minority in Pustec, while Greeks comprise a majority in Finiq and Dropull.

==== Belarus ====
- Belarusians are a minority in some parts of Belarus.

==== Bosnia and Herzegovina ====
- Bosnia and Herzegovina did not have any ethnic group comprise a majority of its population at the time of the last census in 1991 (which took place before the Bosnian War). A census was conducted in Bosnia and Herzegovina in October 2013, and these results showed a slight Bosniak majority, who constitute 50.11% of the population.

==== Bulgaria ====
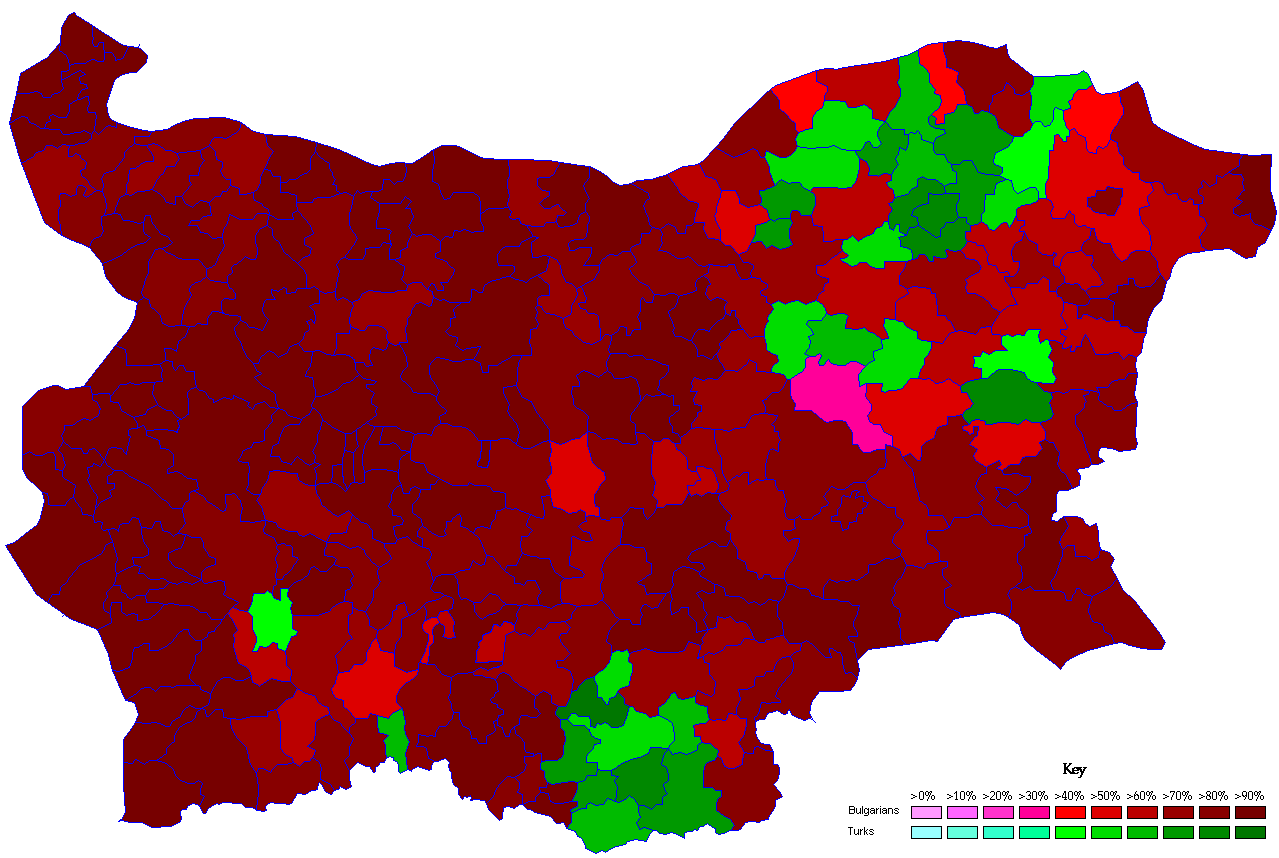
Ethnic composition of Bulgaria in 2011.

- Ethnic Turks outnumber ethnic Bulgarians in Kardzhali and Razgrad Provinces (ethnic Bulgarians are an about 85% majority in Bulgaria overall).
- According to the Bulgarian census of 2001, a total of 43 municipalities (out of 262) have a Muslim majority, although Muslims only form around 10% of Bulgaria's total population.

==== Estonia ====
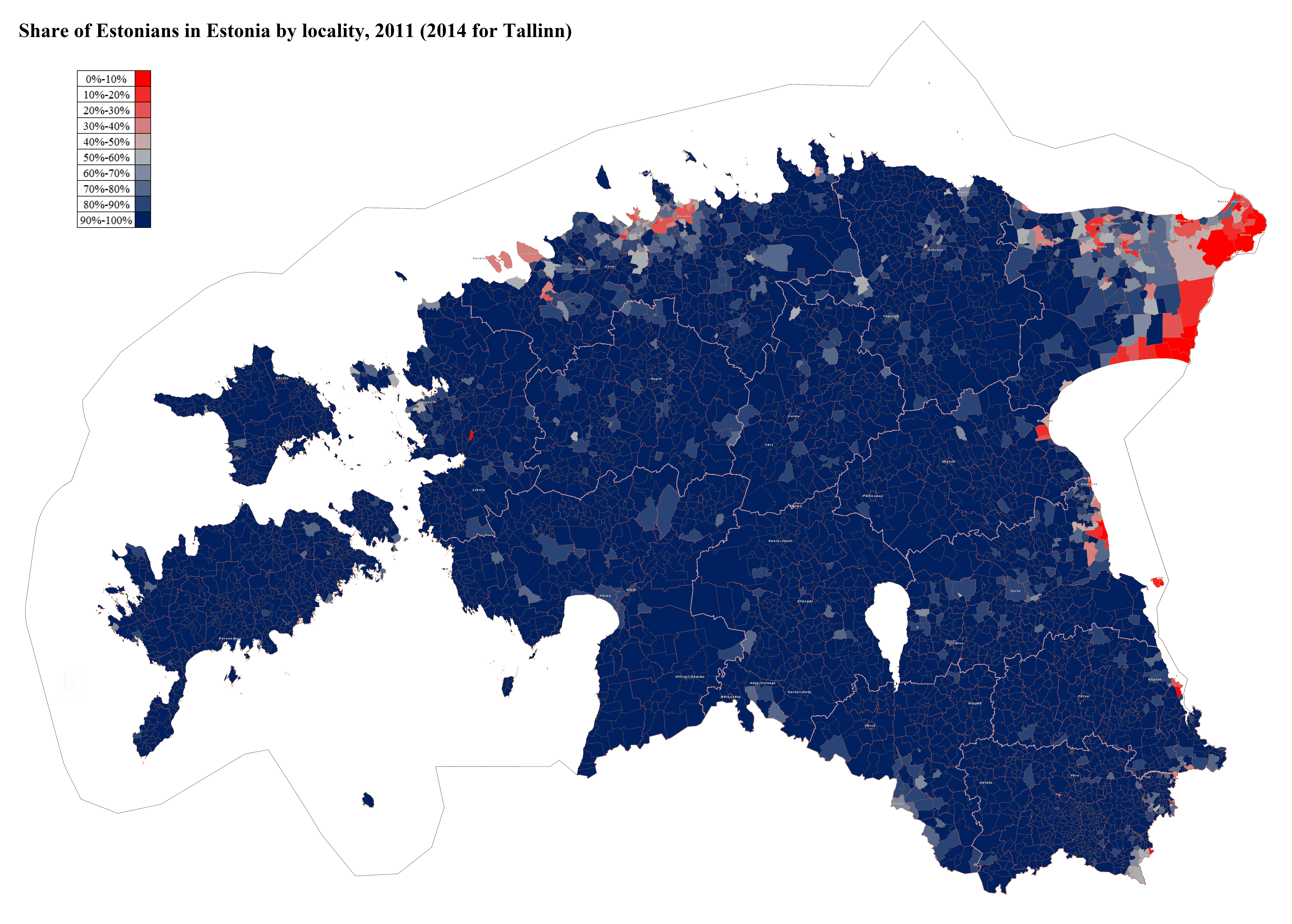
Share of ethnic Estonians by locality in Estonia

- While Estonians form a majority of the population in Estonia overall, Russians made up a majority in Ida-Viru County, parts of Tallinn and some towns and villages in other counties.

==== Italy ====
- German speakers are the local majority and an officially recognised national minority in the autonomous province of South Tyrol; standard German is taught in schools and used in all writing, but the South Tyrolean dialect is commonly spoken; German speakers are the majority in 103 out of 116 municipalities, and in the province as a whole.
- Ladin is a recognised minority language spoken in the Dolomites mountains, being the majority language in 15 municipalities of the Trentino-Alto Adige region.
- The Slovene minority in Italy is the majority in some municipalities in eastern parts of the Friuli-Venezia Giulia region.
- French and Franco-Provençal (Valdôtain) are officially recognised and spoken by 58% of the population of Aosta Valley region, although there is no official figure of the municipalities where speakers are majority.

==== Kosovo ====
- North Kosovo has a Serb majority, while Kosovo overall has an Albanian majority. This division has led to controversial negotiations for land swapping southern Albanian-majority areas of Serbia for northern Serb-majority areas of Kosovo.

==== Latvia ====
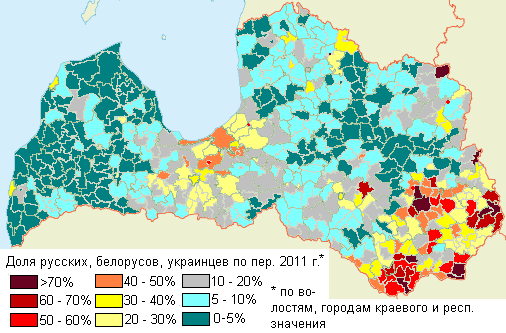
East Slavic share in Latvia in 2011

- The Latvian SSR almost became minority-majority (the ethnic Latvian population there decreased from 62% to 52% between 1959 and 1989), but the collapse of the USSR prevented this from happening. While the whole Latvian SSR never became majority-minority, its eight largest cities did become majority-minority by 1989.

==== Moldova ====
- Transnistria did not have any ethnic group compromise a majority of its population in 2004.

==== Montenegro ====
- Montenegro does not have any ethnic group compromise a majority of its population.
- By religious affiliation, six municipalities have a non-Eastern Orthodox majority. The municipalities are: Gusinje (91% Muslim), Petnjica (98% Muslim), Plav (70% Muslim), Rožaje (95% Muslim), Tuzi (50% Muslim, 43% Roman Catholic) and Ulcinj (72% Muslim, 11% Roman Catholic).

==== North Macedonia ====
- North Macedonia has some places/areas where Macedonians are a minority. These places/areas often have an Albanian majority.

==== Romania ====
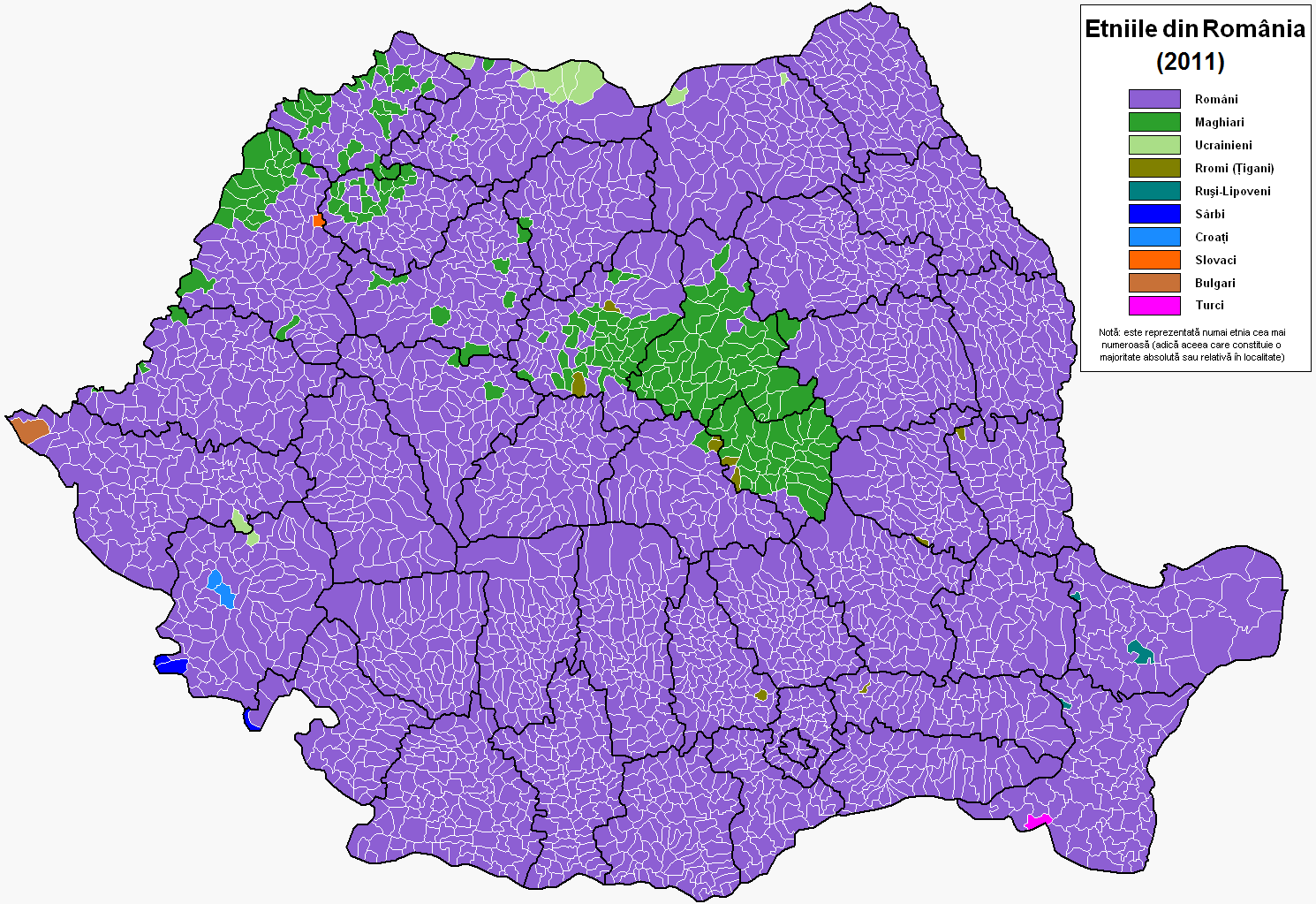
Ethnic composition of Romania in 2011.

- The Harghita and Covasna provinces in Romania have a Hungarian majority, while Romania as a whole has a Romanian majority.

==== Russia ====
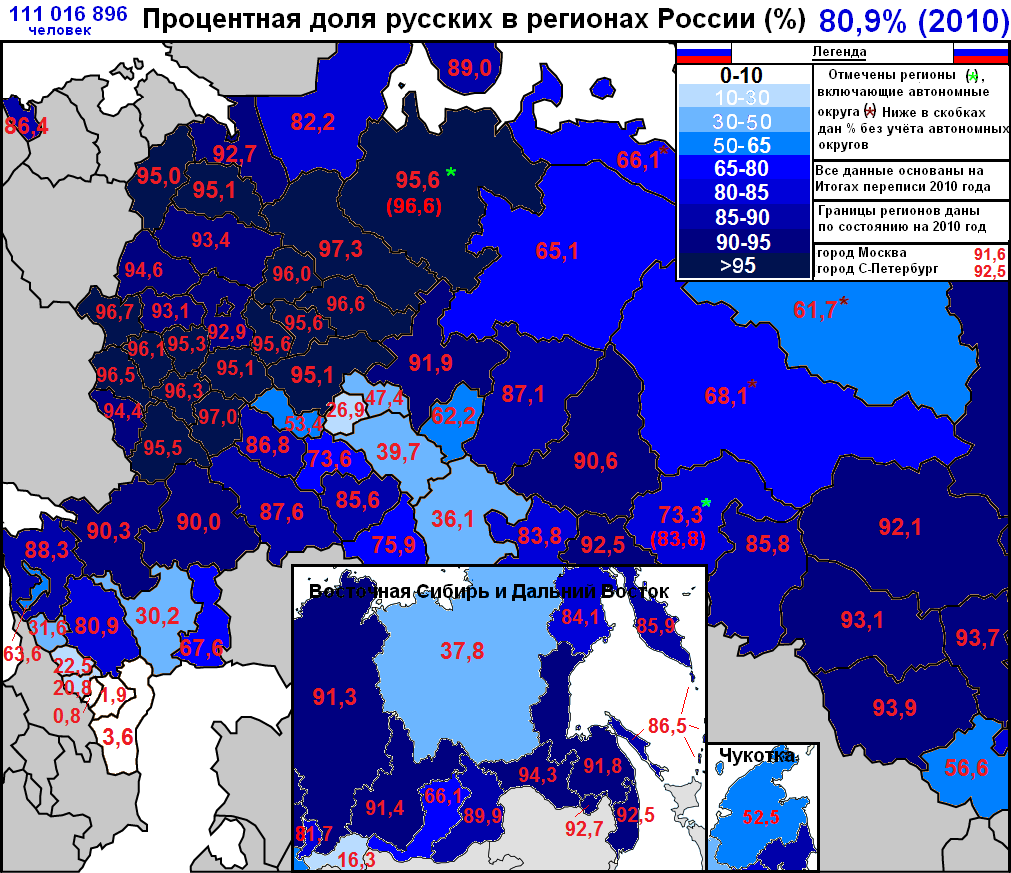
Ethnic Russians as a % of the population by Russian region

- There were concerns that the whole Soviet Union would lose its ethnic Russian majority due to the high birth rates in the Caucasus and Central Asia as early as 1970. The percentage of Russians among the whole Soviet population was consistently declining, from 55% in 1959 to 51% in 1989. However, the Soviet Union collapsed in 1991, before the Soviet Union could have lost its ethnic Russian majority. In the Russian Federation era, based on the 2010 census; 8 of the 22 republics of Russia had a non-Russian majority, while 9 of the 22 had a Russian majority.

==== Serbia ====
- Serbia has some municipalities where Serbs are a minority, notably in north of Vojvodina where Hungarians are a majority.
- Bosniak Muslims form the majority of the city of Novi Pazar and the surrounding region, although they only form around 3% of Serbia's total population.
- Albanians form the majority of population in the municipalities of Preševo and Bujanovac.

==== Slovakia ====
- Slovakia has some places/areas where Slovaks are a minority and Hungarians are a majority.

==== Ukraine ====
- Ukrainians are a minority in the Crimea, Sevastopol, and some places in other regions, especially Donbas and Budjak. Ukraine lost control over Crimea and a part of the Donbas in 2014.

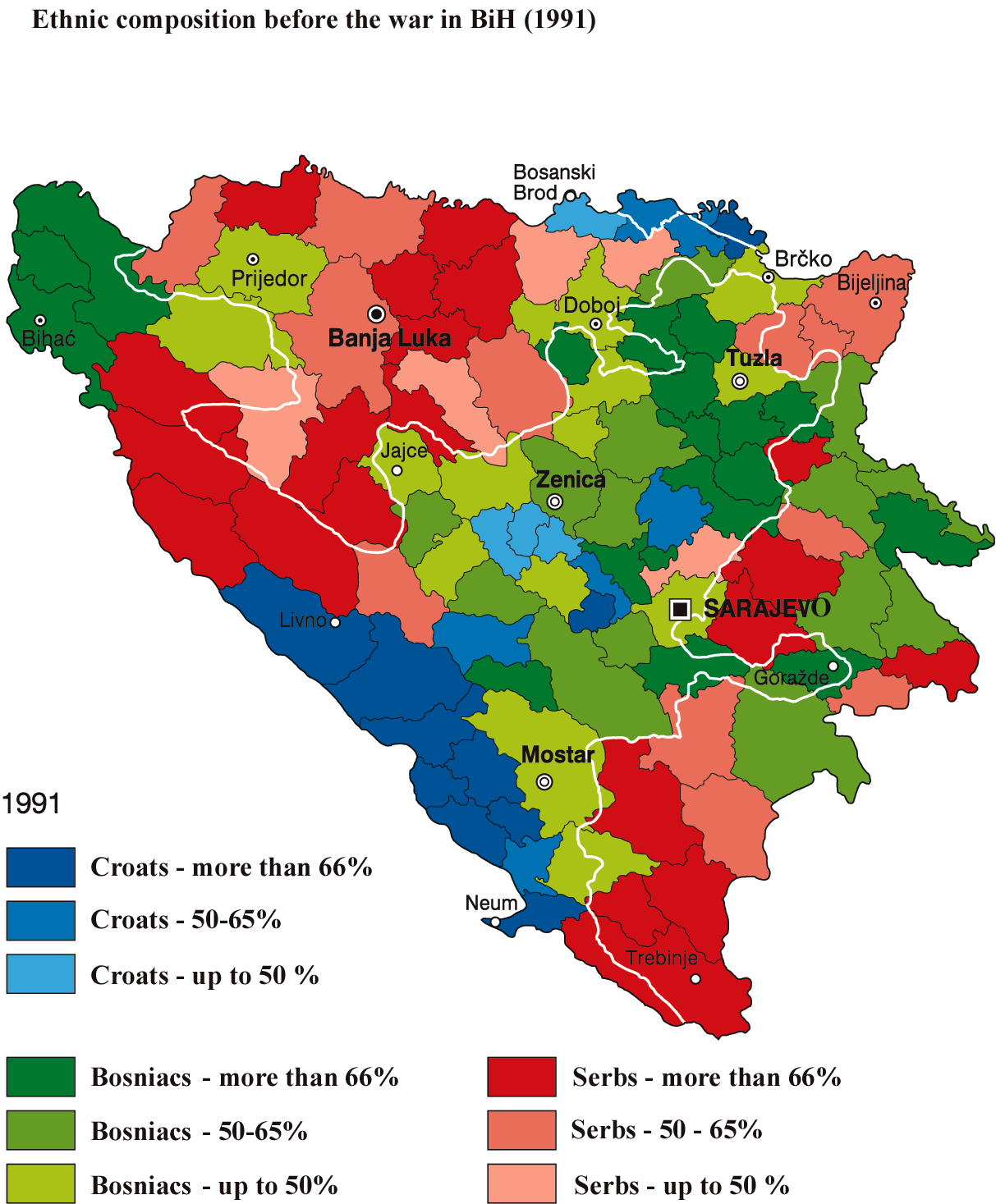
Ethnic composition of Bosnia and Herzegovina in 1991

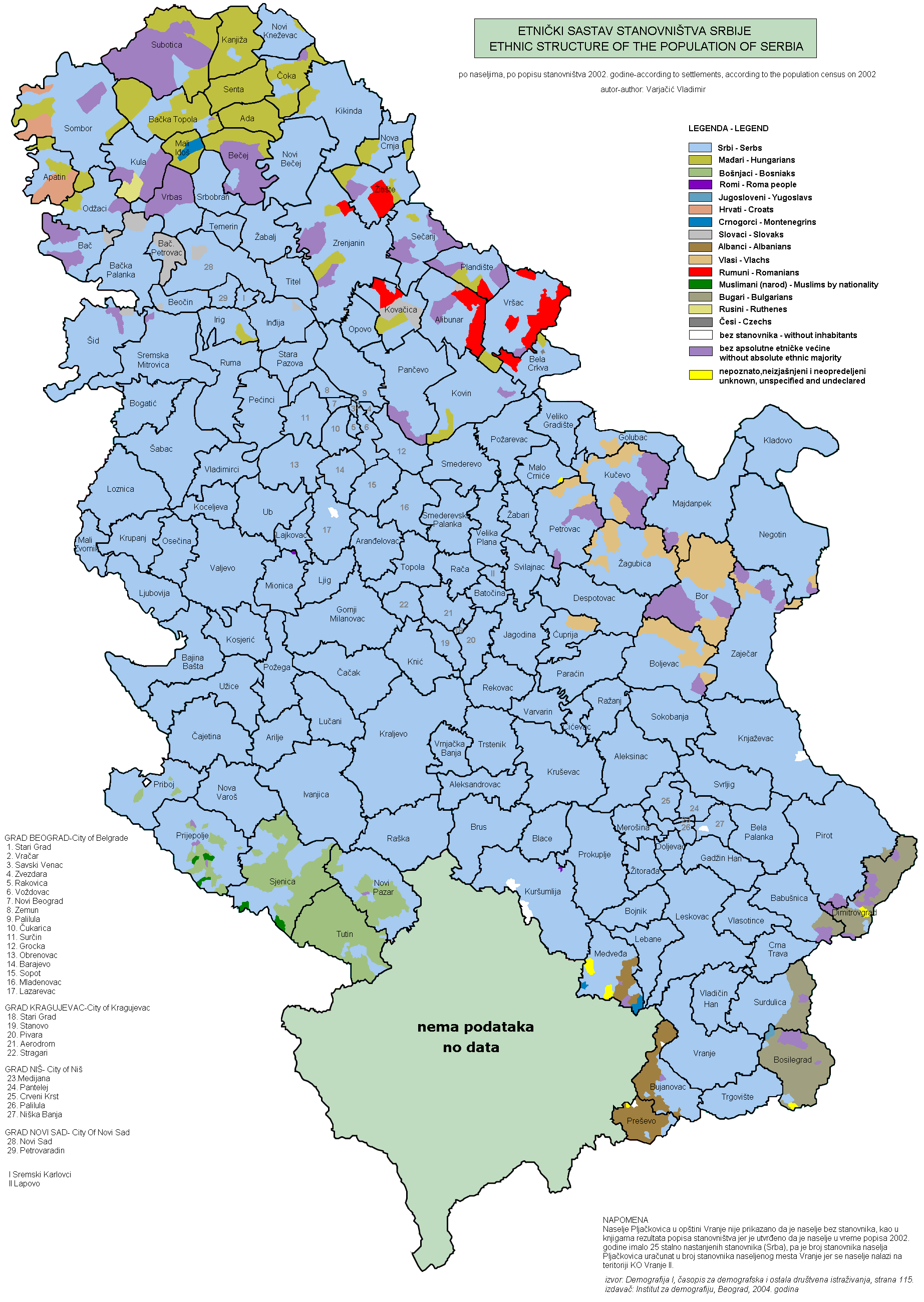
Ethnic composition of Serbia in 2002.

==== United Kingdom ====
- White British (mainly English people) are an ethnic plurality in London (36.8%), but those identifying as "White" are 53.8% of London's population.
- White British people are also a plurality or minority in Luton (31.8%), Birmingham (42.9%), Slough (24%) and Leicester (33.2%). All figures are from the 2021 census.

=== North America ===
==== Canada ====
- Two of Canada's sparsely populated territories have had a majority Indigenous population since their formal establishment: Northwest Territories & Nunavut.
- Outside of the far North, there were over 20 majority-minority municipalities in Canada at the time of the 2021 Census.
- Two of Canada's largest cities, Toronto and Vancouver, are majority-minority. Over half of the country's other majority-minority cities are suburban commuter cities found outside these two cities.
- Though many have been depopulated due to urbanization, rural majority-Black settlements have existed across Canada since the 19th century. Today, they are mostly found in Nova Scotia, with North Preston being a notable example.

Majority-minority municipalities by province, and percentage of non-European population:

British Columbia

- Richmond (81%)
- Burnaby (69.5%)
- Surrey (69.3%)
- Central Coast (68.3%)
- Coquitlam (58.5%)
- Vancouver (56.8%)
- North Coast (54%)

Alberta

- Brooks (50.9%)

Saskatchewan

- Meadow Lake (60%)
- Prince Albert (56.3%)

Manitoba

- Thompson (60.3%)
- Neepawa (57.5%)

Ontario

- Markham (82.3%)
- Brampton (81.1%)
- Richmond Hill (66.6%)
- Ajax (65.6%)
- Mississauga (62.4%)
- Toronto (56.5%)
- Milton (55.6%)
- Pickering (53%)

Quebec

- Brossard (50.8%)

==== United States ====
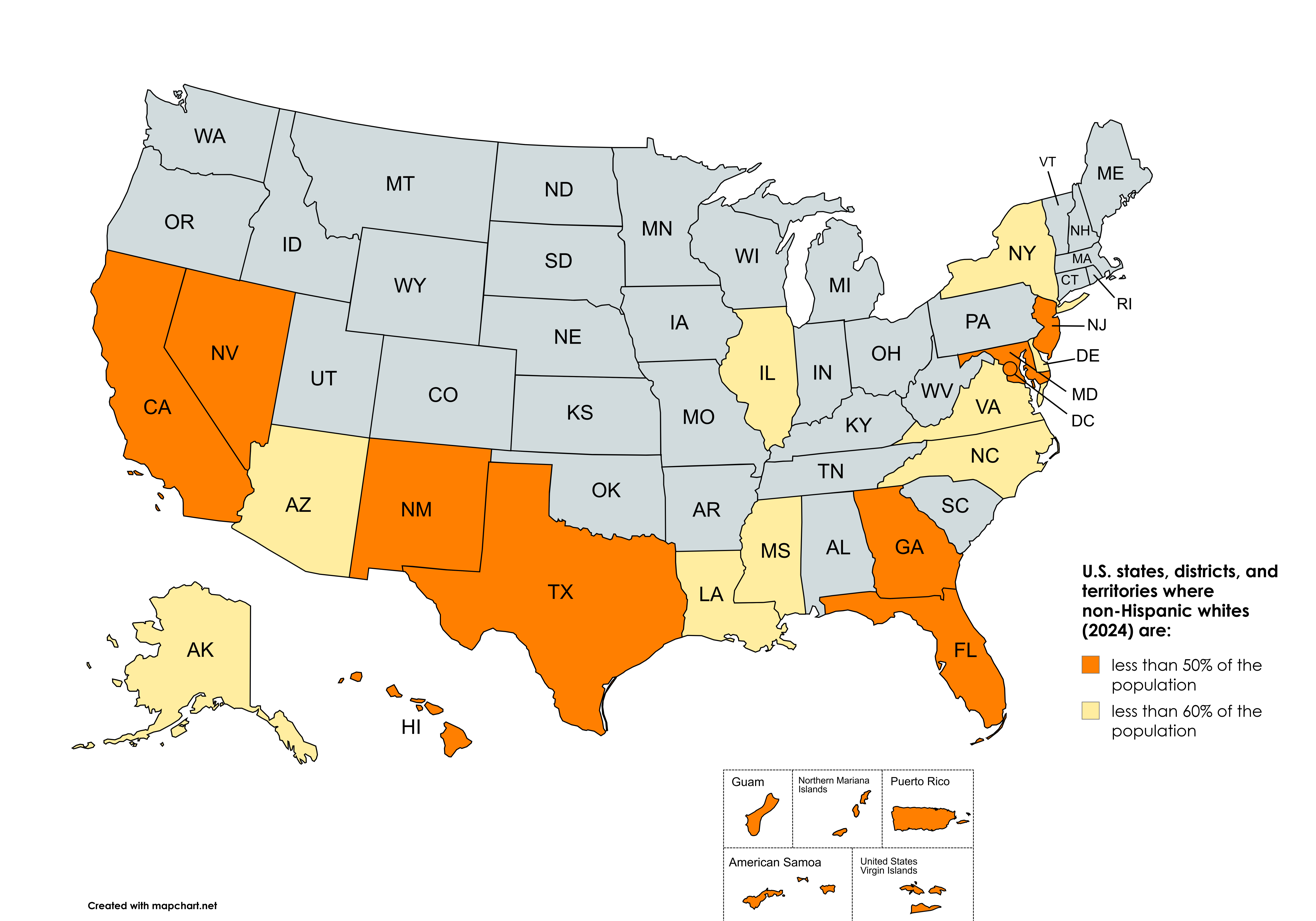

In the United States of America, majority-minority area or minority-majority area is a term describing a U.S. state or jurisdiction whose population is composed of less than 50% non-Hispanic whites. White Hispanic and Latino Americans are excluded in many definitions. Racial data is derived from self-identification questions on the U.S. census and on U.S. Census Bureau estimates. (See Race and ethnicity in the United States census). The term is often used in voting rights law to designate voting districts which are altered under the Voting Rights Act to enable ethnic or language minorities "the opportunity to elect their candidate of choice." In that context, the term is first used by the Supreme Court in 1977. The Court had previously used the term in employment discrimination and labor relations cases.

=== Oceania ===
==== Australia ====
It is estimated that Europeans first outnumbered Indigenous Australians in Australia in the 1840s. There are still a number of rural and regional towns and communities where Indigenous Australians outnumber Europeans, but nationally Indigenous Australians constitute only 3.3% of the population. The state-level jurisdiction with the highest proportion of Indigenous Australians is the Northern Territory, where people of Indigenous ancestry make up 30.3% of the population, the largest single ethnic group by reported ancestry (although a smaller proportion, 25.5%, identify as Indigenous).

Of the other ethnic groups in Australia, no single ethnic group constitutes a majority overall. English Australians make up the largest single ethnic group by ancestry, being reported by 36.1% of the population in the 2016 census. The next largest ancestry group is "Australian", at 33.5%. As ancestry is self-reported and each person can nominate two ancestries (and through a separate question report whether they identify as Indigenous Australian), there is no certainty as to the ethnic make-up of the ancestry group who identify as "Australian". It is commonly speculated however that the majority of the "Australian" ancestry group have some ancestral origin from the British Isles, and as a result when people with ethnic origin in the British Isles are considered as a single group ("Anglo-Celtic Australians"), the numbers for the "Australian" ancestry group is added to that of the English, Scottish, Welsh, and Irish ethnic groups, as well as (sometimes) Manx Australians and Cornish Australians. When "Anglo-Celtic" ethnic groups are considered together, they make up a majority of Australia's population overall (58% estimated in 2018). When considered as one group, European Australians make up 57.2% of the population (including 46% North-West European and 11.2% Southern and Eastern European). (This figure excludes those who nominate their ancestry as simply "Australian", who are therefore categorised as part of the Oceanian ancestry group.)

Reflecting the diversity of ancestries at the national level, in most Australian towns and suburbs, no single ancestry group constitutes a majority of the population. In many places, if the "Australians" ancestry group is counted as part of an "Anglo-Celtic" ethnic group together with English, Scottish, Welsh and Irish Australians, this group constitutes a majority of the local population. However, in many other places, even when these ancestry groups are counted as one, there is no single majority ethnic group. It is rare for any non-Anglo-Celtic and non-Indigenous ethnic group to make up a majority in a suburb. For example, in the 2016 census, in the Sydney metropolitan area, Chinese people in the suburbs Burwood and Hurstville made up just over 50% of the population (although reports of Chinese ancestry are less than 50% of all ancestries reported in the census in each suburb, as each person is permitted to nominate more than one ancestry). However, by the 2021 census the Chinese-ancestry population in both suburbs had dropped below 50%. Chinese Australians make up 5.6% of the national population, making them the fifth largest ancestry group overall (after the English, Australian, Scottish and Irish ancestry groups).

==== Fiji ====
- Fiji did not have any racial or ethnic group comprise a majority from the 1930s to the 1990s, with the exception of the 1960s and possibly early-1970s.

==== New Zealand ====
- European New Zealanders are a minority in the Auckland region (49.8%), Ōpōtiki district (49.7%), and Wairoa district (46.9%). Within Auckland, ten of the 21 local board areas have a minority European population: Ōtara-Papatoetoe (14.6%), Māngere-Ōtāhuhu (18.4%), Manurewa (24.5%), Puketāpapa (32.1%), Papakura (36.7%), Whau (37.6%), Howick (38.1%), Maungakiekie-Tāmaki (42.2%), Henderson-Massey (43.6%), and Upper Harbour (49.1%).
- The indigenous Māori people form a majority in the Kawerau district (63.2%), Ōpōtiki district (66.2%), Gisborne district (54.8%), Wairoa district (68.5%), and the Chatham Islands territory (68.6%).
- Pacific peoples form a majority in the Māngere-Ōtāhuhu local board area of Auckland (60.4%).
- Asian people form a majority in the Puketāpapa and Howick local board areas of Auckland (50.4% and 52.5% respectively).

=== South America ===
==== Brazil ====
Brazil has become a majority "non-White" country as of the 2010 census, together with the federative units of Espírito Santo, the Federal District, Goiás, and Minas Gerais.

Those identifying as White declined to 47.7% (about 91 million people) in the 2010 census from 52.9% (about 93 million people) in 2000 in the entire country. However, in Brazil, this is not simply a matter of origin and birthrate, but identity changes as well. The Black minority did not enlarge its representation in the population to more than 1.5% in the period, while it was mostly the growth in the number of pardo people (~38% in 2000, 42.4% in 2010) that caused the demographic plurality of Brazil.

==== Colombia ====
Afro-Colombians make up roughly about 10–12% of country's overall population, but make up a majority in many areas in the Colombia's Pacific region, especially in Chocó Department, where they make up 80–90% of the population.

== See also ==
- Dominant minority (including non-US examples)
- Global majority
- Race and ethnicity in the United States
- List of US states and territories that are majority minority
- List of majority minority United States congressional districts
- Lists of U.S. cities with non-white majority populations
- List of U.S. communities with Hispanic-majority populations
- Race and ethnicity and the United States Census
- Race and ethnicity in censuses worldwide
- White flight
