= Demographics of Leicester =

- Population pyramid of Leicester
- Population: 368,571 (2021)

Population density in the 2011 census in Leicester.

Leicester, England is an ethnically and culturally diverse city. It is the thirteenth most populous city in the United Kingdom.

Industry sectors over time in Leicester

== Population ==
Leicester's total population, according to the 2011 UK census, was 329,839. The population density was 4,494 people per square km.

== Ethnicity ==
Ethnic demography of Leicester from 1961 to 2021

Population pyramid of Leicester by ethnicity in 2021

Ethnic makeup of Leicester by single year ages in 2021

The following table shows the ethnic group of respondents in the 2001 and 2011 censuses in Leicester. The local district has been in a majority-minority state since around 2008 and was reported in the 2011 census to be that, with the White British population at 45% of the population of Leicester. Asian British residents, especially Indians, have risen since post-war migration to the UK began, famously Asians from Uganda who were expelled in 1972. In 1991, Asians as a broad multi-ethnic group made up nearly a quarter of the city's population but have risen to above a third of the population at 37.1%. Black British people have also risen as a group with the increase mostly coming from Black Africans who have risen from 0.3% of the city's population to nearly 4%.

Ethnic group	1961 estimations		1971 estimations		1981 estimations		1991 census		2001 census		2011 census		2021 census	
Ethnic group	Number	%	Number	%	Number	%	Number	%	Number	%	Number	%	Number	%
White: Total	267,470	97.8%	255,928	90%	207,109	78.6%	202,332	71.1%	178,739	63.85%	166,636	50.52%	150,657	40.88%
White: British	–	–	–	–	–	–	–	–	169,456	60.54%	148,629	45.06%	122,395	33.21%
White: Irish	–	–	–	–	–	–	4,134	1.52%	3,602	1.29%	2,524	0.77%	1,789	0.49%
White: Gypsy or Irish Traveller (Note: New category created for the 2011 census)	–	–	–	–	–	–	–	–	–	–	417	0.13%	457	0.12%
White: Roma (Note: New category created for the 2021 census)	–	–	–	–	–	–	–	–	–	–	–	–	839	0.23%
White: Other	–	–	–	–	–	–	–	–	5,681	2.03%	15,066	4.57%	25,177	6.83%
Asian or Asian British: Total	3,742	1.4%	–	–	48,923	18.6%	72,069	25.3%	85,177	30.43%	122,470	37.13%	159,977	43.40%
Asian or Asian British: Indian	–	–	–	–	44,132	16.7%	64,669	22.7%	72,033	25.73%	93,335	28.30%	126,421	34.30%
Asian or Asian British: Pakistani	–	–	–	–	1,827	0.7%	2,827	1%	4,276	1.53%	8,067	2.45%	12,673	3.44%
Asian or Asian British: Bangladeshi	–	–	–	–	591		1,131		1,926	0.69%	3,642	1.10%	7,055	1.91%
Asian or Asian British: Chinese (Note: In 2001, listed under the 'Chinese or other ethnic group' heading.)	–	–	–	–	495		716		1,426	0.51%	4,245	1.29%	2,481	0.67%
Asian or Asian British: Other Asian	–	–	–	–	1,878	0.7%	2,726	0.9%	5,516	1.97%	13,181	4.00%	11,347	3.08%
Black or Black British: Total	–	–	–	–	5,300	2%	7,065	2.5%	8,595	3.07%	20,585	6.24%	28,766	7.80%
Black or Black British: Caribbean	–	–	–	–	3,382	1.3%	4,394	1.5%	4,610	1.65%	4,790	1.45%	5,025	1.36%
Black or Black British: African	–	–	–	–	568		782		3,432	1.23%	12,480	3.78%	21,536	5.84%
Black or Black British: Other Black	–	–	–	–	1,350		1,889		553	0.20%	3,315	1.01%	2,764	0.75%
Mixed: Total	–	–	–	–	–	–	–	–	6,506	2.32%	11,580	3.51%	13,899	3.77%
Mixed: White and Black Caribbean	–	–	–	–	–	–	–	–	2,841	1.01%	4,691	1.42%	5,025	1.36%
Mixed: White and Black African	–	–	–	–	–	–	–	–	539	0.19%	1,161	0.35%	1,776	0.48%
Mixed: White and Asian	–	–	–	–	–	–	–	–	1,908	0.68%	3,388	1.03%	3,659	0.99%
Mixed: Other Mixed	–	–	–	–	–	–	–	–	1,218	0.44%	2,340	0.71%	3,439	0.75%
Other: Total	–	–	–	–	2,266	0.9%	3,234	1.1%	904	0.32%	8,568	2.60%	15,272	4.14%
Other: Arab (Note: New category created for the 2011 census)	–	–	–	–	–	–	–	–	–	–	3,311	1.00%	3,402	0.92%
Other: Any other ethnic group	–	–	–	–	–	–			904	0.32%	5,257	1.59%	11,870	3.22%
Ethnic minority: Total	6,000	2.2%	28,280	10%	56,489	21.4%	82,368	28.9%	101,182	36.15%	163,203	49.48%	217,914	59.12%
Total	273,470	100%	284,208	100%	263,598	100%	284,700	100%	279,921	100%	329,839	100%	368,571	100%

Notes for table above

Distribution of ethnic groups in Leicester according to the 2011 census.
White

White-British

White-Irish

White-Other

Asian

Asian-Indian

Asian-Pakistani

Asian-Bangladeshi

Asian-Chinese

Black

Black-African

Black-Caribbean

Other-Arab
Population pyramids of each ethnic group in Leicester

White British

=== Ethnicity of school pupils ===
The ethnicity of school pupils within Leicester has been in flux and in a majority-minority state since statistics have been first collected in 2003. For instance, the most profound change can be seen with the White British, who have declined from 45.6% in 2004 to 23.4% in 2022. Asian British school pupils have risen in percentage, going from 37.9% of the areas school pupil population to a near majority (47%). All other groups have grown in size as well. Other White school pupils have risen from 1.7% to 7.8%, Black British school pupils have risen from 6.4% to 10.4% in 2016 but then declined to 9.5% in 2022, Mixed have risen from 5.5% to 7.5% and Other ethnicities have gone from 0.8% to 2.7%.

Ethnic group	School year											
Ethnic group	1971		2004		2008		2012		2015/16		2021/2022	
Ethnic group	Number	%	Number	%	Number	%	Number	%	Number	%	Number	%
White: Total	–	86.5%	19,480	48.1%	16,720	42.4%	15,515	39%	16,583	36.6%	18,905	31.8%
White: British	–	–	18,490	45.6%	15,090	38.3%	13,258	33.3%	13,215	29.1%	13,890	23.4%
White: Irish	–	–	190		133		86		73		65	
White: Traveller of Irish heritage	–	–	70		35		50		61		47	
White: Gypsy/Roma	–	–	30		30		139		235		266	
White: Other	–	–	700	1.7%	1,432		1,978		2,999		4,637	7.8%
Asian / Asian British: Total	–	–	15,360	37.9%	15,924	40.4%	16,512	41.5%	19,682	43.4%	27,906	47%
Asian / Asian British: Indian	–	–	12,150	30%	12,267	31.1%	12,049	30.3%	14,179	31.3%	19,855	33.4%
Asian / Asian British: Pakistani	–	–	1,020		1,227		1,382		1,724		2,557	
Asian / Asian British: Bangladeshi	–	–	560		638		826		994		1,617	
Asian / Asian British: Chinese	–	–	80		79		80		113		169	
Asian / Asian British: Other Asians	–	–	1,550	3.8%	1,713		2,175		2,672		3,708	6.2%
Black / Black British: Total	–	–	2,610	6.4%	3,450	8.7%	4,050	10.2%	4,726	10.4%	5,680	9.5%
Black: Caribbean	–	–	590		534		505		500		454	
Black: African	–	–	1,860	4.6%	2,576		3,130		3,589		4,390	7.4%
Black: Other Blacks	–	–	160		337		415		637		836	
Mixed / British Mixed	–	–	2,230	5.5%	2,440	6.2%	2,730	6.9%	3,082	6.8%	4,457	7.5%
Other: Total	–	–	310	0.8%	534	1.4%	650	1.6%	910	2%	1,618	2.7%
Unclassified	–	–	570	1.4%	152	0.4%	312	0.8%	384	0.8%	833	1.4%
Non-White: Total	–	13.5%		51.9%		57.6%		61%		63.4%		68.2%
Total:	–	100%	40,540	100%	39,430	100%	39,765	100%	45,367	100%	59,399	100%

Ethnicity of births

Ethnic Group	1981 estimates		2021	
Ethnic Group	Number	%	Number	%
White: Total	–	66%	1,362	32.6%
White: British	–	–	897	21.5%
White: Other	–	–	465	11.1%
Asian / Asian British: Total	–	–	1,858	44.6%
Asian / Asian British: Indian	–	–	1,384	33.2%
Asian / Asian British: Pakistani	–	–	176	4.2%
Asian / Asian British: Bangladeshi	–	–	111	2.7%
Asian / Asian British: Other Asians	–	–	187	4.5%
Black / Black British: Total	–	–	324	7.7%
Black: Caribbean	–	–	27	0.6%
Black: African	–	–	258	6.2%
Black: Other Blacks	–	–	39	0.9%
Mixed / British Mixed	–	–	331	7.9%
Other: Total	–	–	130	3.1%
Not Stated	–	–	167	4.0%
Non-White: Total (not including Not stated)	–	33%	2,643	63.3%
Total:	–	100%	4,172	100%

== Country of birth ==
UK born and foreign born population pyramid in Leicester in 2021. Males and females representing the UK born population while foreign males and females representing the foreign born population.

Country of Birth	Year											
Country of Birth	1971		1981		1991		2001		2011		2021	
Country of Birth	Number	%	Number	%	Number	%	Number	%	Number	%	Number	%
United Kingdom	242,255	87.4%	223,681	81%	217,656	80.4%	215,455	77%	218,996	66.4%	217,078	58.9%
England	234,551	84.6%	216,729	78.5%	212,010	78.4%			214,403	65%	213,555	57.9%
Scotland	4,006		3,708		2,854				2,330		1821	0.49%
Wales	2,243		1,947		1,726				1,380		1078	0.29%
Northern Ireland	1,455		–		1,019				781		590	0.16%
United Kingdom (not otherwise specified)			1,297		47		84		102		467	0.13%
Europe (non-UK)	9,015	3.3%	7,472	2.7%	6,180	2.3%	7,563	2.7%	19,689	6%	31,880	8.6%
Ireland	4,807		3,890		3,099		2,486		1,933		1,240	0.34%
Other EEC/EU			1,532	0.6%	1,750	0.6%	3,021	1.1%	15,927	4.8%		
Other Europe	4,208		2,050		1,331		2,056		1,829		31,880	8.6%
Asia and Middle East	12,567	4.5%	20,112	7.3%	23,623	8.7%	30,501	10.9%	55,108	16.7%	79,372	21.5%
India	11,365	4.1%	18,238	6.6%	20,837	7.7%	24,677				59,842	16.2%
Pakistan	758		912		1,162		1,854				4,989	1.4%
Bangladesh			397		686		1,051				3,233	0.9%
Far East	444		565		657		1,751					
Middle East			–		281		771					
Other							4					
Africa	7,088	2.6%	19,082	6.9%	18,327	6.8%	22,056	7.9%	31,983	9.7%	33,542	9.1%
North America and Caribbean	2,870	1%	2,550	0.9%			2,909	1%	3,545		2,825	
South America							169					
Oceania			–				539		516		447	
Other: New Commonwealth (Note: Used as main option for when no other options are given, for example in 1971. This group contains all for Canada, Australia and New Zealand)	444		493									
Other: Old Commonwealth (Note: Used as a conglomerate for New Commonwealth for when there are no other options as for example in 1971. This group contains all for remenents of the British Empire after 1945 (if not already indicated).)	402		628		455							
Other:	2548		2,226				645		2			
Total	277,189	100%	276,244	100%	270,525	100%	279,921	100%	329,839	100%	368,570	100%

== Languages ==
The most common main languages spoken in Leicester according to the 2011 census are shown below. There were around over 70 languages or dialects spoken in the city in 2011.

Rank	Language	Usual residents aged 3+	Proportion
1	English	228,295	72.47%
2	Gujarati	36,347	11.54%
3	Punjabi	7,560	2.40%
4	Polish	6,192	1.97%
5	Urdu	3,376	1.07%
6	Somali	3,331	1.06%
7	Arabic	2,516	0.80%
8	Bengali	1,808	0.57%
9	Portuguese	1,750	0.56%
10	Kurdish	1,520	0.48%
11	Tamil	1,498	0.48%
12	Hindi	1,095	0.35%
13	Persian	1,021	0.32%
14	Slovak	878	0.28%
15	French	849	0.27%
16	Shona	801	0.25%
17	Turkish	584	0.19%
18	Greek	546	0.17%
19	Swahili/Kiswahili	533	0.17%
20	Tagalog/Filipino	496	0.16%
	Other	14,015	4.45%

== Religion ==
Faith in Leicester (2021)
1. Christian (24.7%)
2. No Religion (23.0%)
3. Muslim (23.5%)
4. Hindu (17.9%)
5. Sikh (4.50%)
6. Buddhist (0.30%)
7. Jewish (0.10%)
8. Other Religions (0.60%)
9. Religion not Stated (5.60%)

The following table shows the religion of respondents in the 2001 and 2011 censuses in Leicester. In 2012, almost 240 individual faith groups were reported to being practised in Leicester.

Religion	1980s estimations		2001		2011		2021	
Religion	Number	%	Number	%	Number	%	Number	%
Christian	–	–	125,187	44.72%	106,872	32.40%	91,161	24.73%
Buddhist	–	–	638	0.23%	1,224	0.37%	1,181	0.32%
Hindu	–	–	41,248	14.74%	50,087	15.19%	65,821	17.86%
Jewish	–	–	417	0.15%	295	0.09%	326	0.09%
Muslim	7,000	–	30,885	11.03%	61,440	18.63%	86,443	23.45%
Sikh	–	–	11,796	4.21%	14,457	4.38%	16,451	4.46%
Other religion	–	–	1,179	0.42%	1,839	0.56%	2,075	0.56%
No religion	–	–	48,789	17.43%	75,280	22.82%	84,607	22.96%
Religion not stated	–	–	19,782	7.07%	18,345	5.56%	20,509	5.56%
Total	–	100%	279,921	100.00%	329,839	100.00%	368,574	100.00%

Distribution of religions in Leicester according to the 2011 census.
Christianity

Islam

Judaism

Hinduism

Sikhism

Buddhism

Other religion

No religion

== See also ==
- Demographics of the United Kingdom
- Demographics of England
- Demographics of London
- Demographics of Birmingham
- Demographics of Greater Manchester
- List of English cities by population
- List of English districts by population
- List of English districts and their ethnic composition
- List of English districts by area
- List of English districts by population density
