= Demographics of the West Midlands County =

This article is intended to give an overview of the demographics of the metropolitan county of the West Midlands in the midlands of England. The data is analysed by the Office for National Statistics and produced for each of the county's seven metropolitan boroughs and the county overall.

Population density in the 2011 census in the West Midlands.

== Ethnicity ==
Ethnic Group	Year													
Ethnic Group	1966 estimations		1971 estimations		1981 estimations		1991 census		2001 census		2011 census		2021 census	
Ethnic Group	Number	%	Number	%	Number	%	Number	%	Number	%	Number	%	Number	%
White: Total	–	–	2,580,903	93.2%	2,371,072	88.7%	2,237,135	85.1%	2,043,231	80%	1,919,138	70.1%	1,793,173	61.4%
White: British	–	–	–	–	–	–	–	–	1,956,156	76.5%	1,806,708	66%	1,630,823	55.9%
White: Irish	–	–	–	–	–	–	–	–	54,011	2.1%	39,183	1.4%	31,490	1.1%
White: Gypsy or Irish Traveller	–	–	–	–	–	–	–	–	–	–	1,618		2,417	
White: Roma	–	–	–	–	–	–	–	–	–	–	–	–	4,246	
White: Other	–	–	–	–	–	–	–	–	33,064	1.3%	71,629	2.6%	124,197	4.3%
Asian or Asian British: Total	–	–	–	–	206,289	7.7%	276,162	10.5%	352,288	13.8%	514,981	18.8%	667,315	22.9%
Asian or Asian British: Indian	–	–	–	–	118,101	4.4%	148,320	5.6%	157,062	6.1%	185,271	6.8%	226,927	7.8%
Asian or Asian British: Pakistani	–	–	–	–	65,985	2.5%	93,426	3.6%	138,007	5.4%	200,545	7.3%	278,837	9.6%
Asian or Asian British: Bangladeshi	–	–	–	–	11,006	0.4%	19,131	0.7%	29,085	1.1%	48,727		72,168	2.5%
Asian or Asian British: Chinese	–	–	–	–	4,543	0.2%	6,119	0.2%	10,548	0.4%	21,430		22,718	0.8%
Asian or Asian British: Other Asian	–	–	–	–	6,654		9,166		17,586		59,008		66,665	2.3%
Black or Black British: Total	–	–	–	–	80,412	3%	96,384	3.7%	95,234	3.7%	164,069	6%	236,047	8.1%
Black or Black British: African	–	–	–	–	3,602	0.1%	4,134	0.2%	10,000	0.4%	55,557	2%	126,041	4.3%
Black or Black British: Caribbean	–	–	–	–	63,597	2.4%	75,612	2.9%	76,386	3%	79,632	2.9%	81,732	2.8%
Black or Black British: Other Black	–	–	–	–	13,213		16,638	0.6%	8,848	0.3%	28,880		28,274	1%
Mixed: Total	–	–	–	–	–	–	–	–	54,757	2.1%	96,204	3.5%	121,685	4.2%
Mixed: White and Black Caribbean	–	–	–	–	–	–	–	–	31,525	1.2%	53,234	1.9%	59,903	2.1%
Mixed: White and Black African	–	–	–	–	–	–	–	–	2,446		6,053		9,735	
Mixed: White and Asian	–	–	–	–	–	–	–	–	12,641		21,964		28,872	
Mixed: Other Mixed	–	–	–	–	–	–	–	–	8,145		14,953		23,175	
Other: Total	–	–	–	–	15,327	0.5%	19,719	0.7%	10,082	0.4%	42,068	1.5%	101,435	3.5%
Other: Arab	–	–	–	–	–	–	–	–	–	–	16,029		28,083	1%
Other: Any other ethnic group	–	–	–	–	–	–	–	–	10,082	0.4%	26,039		73,352	2.5%
Ethnic minority: Total	102,850	–	188,306	6.8%	302,027	11.3%	392,265	14.9%	512,361	20%	817,322	29.9%	1,126,482	38.6%
Total	–	100%	2,769,209	100%	2,673,099	100%	2,629,400	100%	2,555,592	100%	2,736,460	100%	2,919,655	100%

Distribution of ethnic groups in the West Midlands according to the 2011 census.
White

White-British

White-Irish

White-Other

Asian

Asian-Indian

Asian-Pakistani

Asian-Bangladeshi

Asian-Chinese

Black

Black-African

Black-Caribbean

Other-Arab

== Country of birth ==
Country of birth	2021	
Country of birth	Number	%
United Kingdom	2,286,558	78.3%
EU Countries	165,431	5.7%
Other European	15,241	0.5%
Africa	102,205	3.5%
Middle East and Asia	308,122	10.6%
Caribbean and Americas	37,477	1.3%
Oceania	2,275	0.1%
British Overseas	2,340	0.1%
Overall	2,919,649	100%

== Religion ==
Religion	2001		2021	
Religion	Number	%	Number	%
No religion	305,365	11.9%	814,372	27.9%
Christian	1,701,519	66.5%	1,189,066	40.7%
Buddhist	5,817		9,380	
Hindu	49,484		68,376	
Jewish	3,310		2,559	
Muslim	191,559	7.5%	501,480	17.2%
Sikh	91,890		148,937	
Other religion	5,381		17,805	
Not answered	201,267		167,685	
Total	2,555,592	100%	2,919,660	100%

Distribution of religions in the West Midlands according to the 2011 census.
Christianity

Islam

Judaism

Hinduism

Sikhism

Buddhism

Other religion

No religion

== Housing ==
Tenure	2001		2021	
Tenure	Number	%	Number	%
Owned	667,665		657,680	
Social renting	262,163		248,490	
Private renting	73,373		221,929	
Rent free	29,743		3,661	
Total	1,032,944	100%	1,131,760	

== See also ==
- Demographics of Birmingham
- Demographics of England
- Demographics of the United Kingdom
