= Demographics of Birmingham =

- Population pyramid of Birmingham
- Population: 1,147,316 (2020 estimate)

The demography of Birmingham, England, is analysed by the Office for National Statistics and data produced for each of the wards that make up Birmingham, and the overall city itself, which is the largest city proper in England as well as the core of the third most populous urban area, the West Midlands conurbation.

== Population ==
Historical populations
Year	Pop.	±%
1538	1,300	—
1650	5,472	+320.9%
1700	15,032	+174.7%
1731	23,286	+54.9%
1778	42,250	+81.4%
1785	52,250	+23.7%
1801	73,670	+41.0%
1811	85,753	+16.4%
1821	106,722	+24.5%
1831	146,986	+37.7%
1841	182,922	+24.4%
1851	232,638	+27.2%
1861	296,076	+27.3%
1871	343,787	+16.1%
1881	400,774	+16.6%
1891	478,113	+19.3%
1901	522,204	+9.2%
1911	840,202	+60.9%
1921	919,444	+9.4%
1931	1,002,603	+9.0%
1939	995,039	−0.8%
1951	1,112,685	+11.8%
1961	1,107,187	−0.5%
1971	1,098,654	−0.8%
1981	996,365	−9.3%
1991	1,005,764	+0.9%
2001	977,091	−2.9%
2011	1,073,045	+9.8%
2021	1,144,900	+6.7%

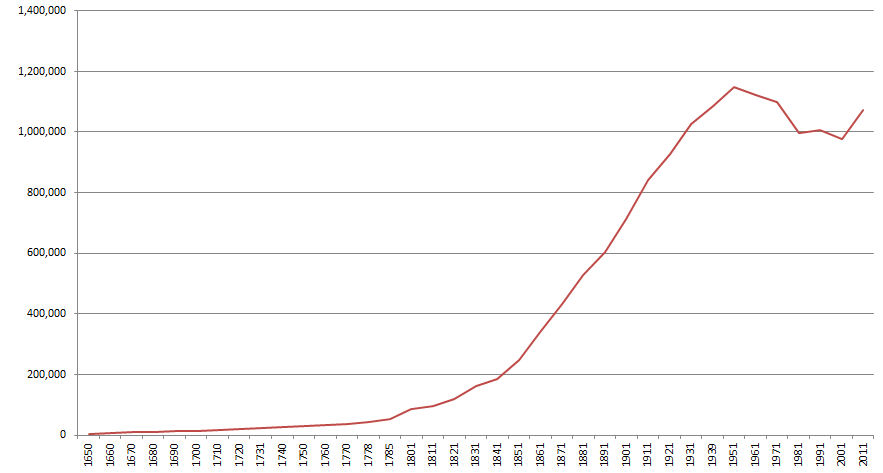
Historical population of Birmingham, England

Birmingham city's total population was 977,099 in 2001. The 2005 estimate for the population of the district of Birmingham was 1,001,200. This is the first time the population has broken the 1,000,000 barrier since 1996. This was a population increase of 0.9% (8,800) from 2004, higher than the 0.6% for the United Kingdom as a whole and 0.7% for England. It is believed to have been caused as a result of increased numbers of births, increased migration and a decrease in deaths in the district. The population of Birmingham is predicted to increase, though it cannot be predicted at certainty due to fluctuations in previous years in migration. The population in Birmingham is predicted to increase by 12.2% (121,500) from 992,100 in 2003 to 1,113,600 in 2028. This is an increase of around 4,000 - 5,000 each year until 2028.

The mid-year population estimates from previous years show a general decrease in the population of Birmingham from 1982 to 2002, before beginning to increase again up to 2005, with the increase from 2004 to 2005 being the largest population increase recorded. Though, in total, the overall decline in the population of Birmingham has been by just over 1%. The dependent population (0-14 and 65+) has declined since 2001 as the working population (15-64) has increased.

The ward with the lowest population following the boundary readjustments of 2004 was Ladywood with 14,801. Prior to the boundary readjustments, it had a population of 23,789. The ward with the highest population following the boundary readjustments of 2004 was Sparkbrook with a population of 31,485, which is an increase from 28,311 prior to the boundary adjustments.

=== Age ===
Birmingham has a young population compared to England as a whole. The mid-year population estimates of 2005 estimate that Birmingham has a younger age structure compared to England, with a higher proportion of the population of Birmingham being under the age of 34, and lower proportion being above the age of 35, than England. In the 20 to 24 year age group, the proportion in Birmingham is about 2% above the national figure.

23.4% of people were aged under 16, 57.7% were aged between 16 and 59, while 18.9% were aged over 60. The average age was 36, compared with 38.6 years for England.

The district of Ladywood was found to have the lowest proportion of people who are 60 years and over than all other districts. Sutton Coldfield district had the highest proportion of people aged 60 years and over. Hodge Hill was found to have the highest population of people from the age of 0 to 15 whilst the districts of Edgbaston and Sutton Coldfield had the lowest.

=== Population density ===
The population density is 3,649 people per square km compared to the 377.2 people per square km for England. The district of Hall Green had the most persons per acre at 55.22. Sutton Coldfield had the lowest number of persons per acre at 15.47, a difference of 39.75.

=== Gender ===
Females represented 51.6% of the population whilst males represented 48.4%. These percentages are above and below the national, regional and county average respectively. However, the 2005 mid-year estimates recorded that there were more males in the city up to the 35-39 age group. 66% of the population of Birmingham that were aged 80 or over were women, and the population of women who were aged 80 or over was 5% of the Birmingham total, as opposed to 3% for males.

The district of Ladywood had the highest percentage of males in its population at 49.7%, whilst Northfield had the lowest at 47.45%. The ward of Ladywood was the only ward which percentage of males exceeded 50%, with a figure of 50.74%. Shard End had the lowest male population percentage at 46.68%.

== Ethnicity ==
Ethnic demography of Birmingham from 1951 to 2021

Ethnic makeup of Birmingham in single year age groups

Population pyramid of Birmingham by ethnicity in 2021

The following table shows the ethnic group of respondents in estimations for 1951, 1961, 1966, 1971, 1981 and in the 1991 to 2021 censuses in Birmingham.

Estimates vary for population sizes', in 1958 the official estimate by the Home Office of individual groups for Birmingham's 'coloured' population was around 20,000 Afro-Caribbeans, 7,000 Pakistanis, 2,000 Indians and 450 West Africans roughly, which is around the same total amount given for the 1961 estimates by Philip Jones.

Ethnic Group	1951 estimations		1961 estimations		1966 estimations		1971 estimations		1981 estimations		1991 census		2001 census		2011 census		2021 census	
Ethnic Group	Number	%	Number	%	Number	%	Number	%	Number	%	Number	%	Number	%	Number	%	Number	%
White: Total	1,107,685	99.6%	1,079,018	97.6%	1,014,350	95.3%	921,819	90.9%	838,751	83.5%	754,274	78.48%	687,406	70.35%	621,636	57.93%	556,608	48.7%
White: British	–	–	–	–	–	–	–	–	–	–	–	–	641,345	65.64%	570,217	53.14%	491,211	42.9%
White: Irish	–	–	–	–	–	–	–	–	–	–	38,290	3.98%	31,467	3.22%	22,021	2.05%	16,964	1.5%
White: Gypsy or Irish Traveller (Note: New category created for the 2011 census)	–	–	–	–	–	–	–	–	–	–	–	–	–	–	408	0.04%	686	0.1%
White: Roma	–	–	–	–	–	–	–	–	–	–	–	–	–	–	–	–	1,833	0.2%
White: Other	–	–	–	–	–	–	–	–	–	–	–	–	14,594	1.49%	28,990	2.70%	45,914	4.0%
Asian or Asian British: Total	–	–	–	–	–	–	–	–	106,550	10.6%	138,867	14.44%	195,794	20.04%	285,640	26.62%	355,384	31%
Asian or Asian British: Indian	–	–	–	–	–	–	–	–	42,865		51,075	5.31%	55,749	5.71%	64,621	6.02%	66,519	5.8%
Asian or Asian British: Pakistani	–	–	–	–	–	–	–	–	49,405		66,085	6.87%	104,017	10.65%	144,627	13.48%	195,102	17.0%
Asian or Asian British: Bangladeshi	–	–	–	–	–	–	–	–	7,523		12,739	1.32%	20,836	2.13%	32,532	3.03%	48,232	4.2%
Asian or Asian British: Chinese (Note: In 2001, listed under the 'Chinese or other ethnic group' heading.)	–	–	–	–	–	–	–	–	2,523	–	3,315	0.34%	5,106	0.52%	12,712	1.18%	12,487	1.1%
Asian or Asian British: Other Asian	–	–	–	–	–	–	–	–	4,234	–	5,653	0.58%	10,086	1.03%	31,148	2.90%	33,044	2.9%
Black or Black British: Total	–	–	–	–	–	–	–	–	49,473	4.9%	56,376	5.86%	59,832	6.12%	96,360	8.98%	125,760	10.9%
Black or Black British: African	–	–	–	–	–	–	–	–	2,443	–	2,803	0.29%	6,206	0.64%	29,991	2.79%	66,822	5.8%
Black or Black British: Caribbean	–	–	–	–	–	–	–	–	39,585		44,770	4.65%	47,831	4.90%	47,641	4.44%	44,718	3.9%
Black or Black British: Other Black	–	–	–	–	–	–	–	–	7,445	–	8,803	0.91%	5,795	0.59%	18,728	1.75%	14,220	1.2%
Mixed: Total	–	–	–	–	–	–	–	–	–	–	–	–	27,946	2.86%	47,605	4.44%	55,205	4.8%
Mixed: White and Black Caribbean	–	–	–	–	–	–	–	–	–	–	–	–	15,644	1.60%	24,720	2.30%	25,119	2.2%
Mixed: White and Black African	–	–	–	–	–	–	–	–	–	–	–	–	1,446	0.15%	3,223	0.30%	4,680	0.4%
Mixed: White and Asian	–	–	–	–	–	–	–	–	–	–	–	–	6,307	0.65%	11,186	1.04%	13,130	1.1%
Mixed: Other Mixed	–	–	–	–	–	–	–	–	–	–	–	–	4,549	0.47%	8,476	0.79%	12,276	1.1%
Other: Total	–	–	–	–	–	–	–	–	9,349	0.9%	11,524	1.19%	6,109	0.63%	21,804	2.03%	51,965	4.6%
Other: Arab	–	–	–	–	–	–	–	–	–	–	–	–	–	–	10,910	1.02%	19,196	1.7%
Other: Any other ethnic group	–	–	–	–	–	–	–	–	–	–	11,524	1.19%	6,109	0.63%	10,894	1.02%	32,769	2.9%
Ethnic minority: Total	5,000	0.4%	28,169	2.4%	49,870	4.7%	92,466	9.1%	165,372	16.4%	206,767	21.52%	289,681	29.65%	451,409	42.07%	588,314	51.3%
Total	1,112,685	100%	1,107,187	100%	1,064,220	100%	1,014,285	100%	1,004,123	100%	961,041	100%	977,087	100%	1,073,045	100%	1,144,922	100%

Notes for table above

Demographic distribution of ethnicities in the 2021 census in Birmingham

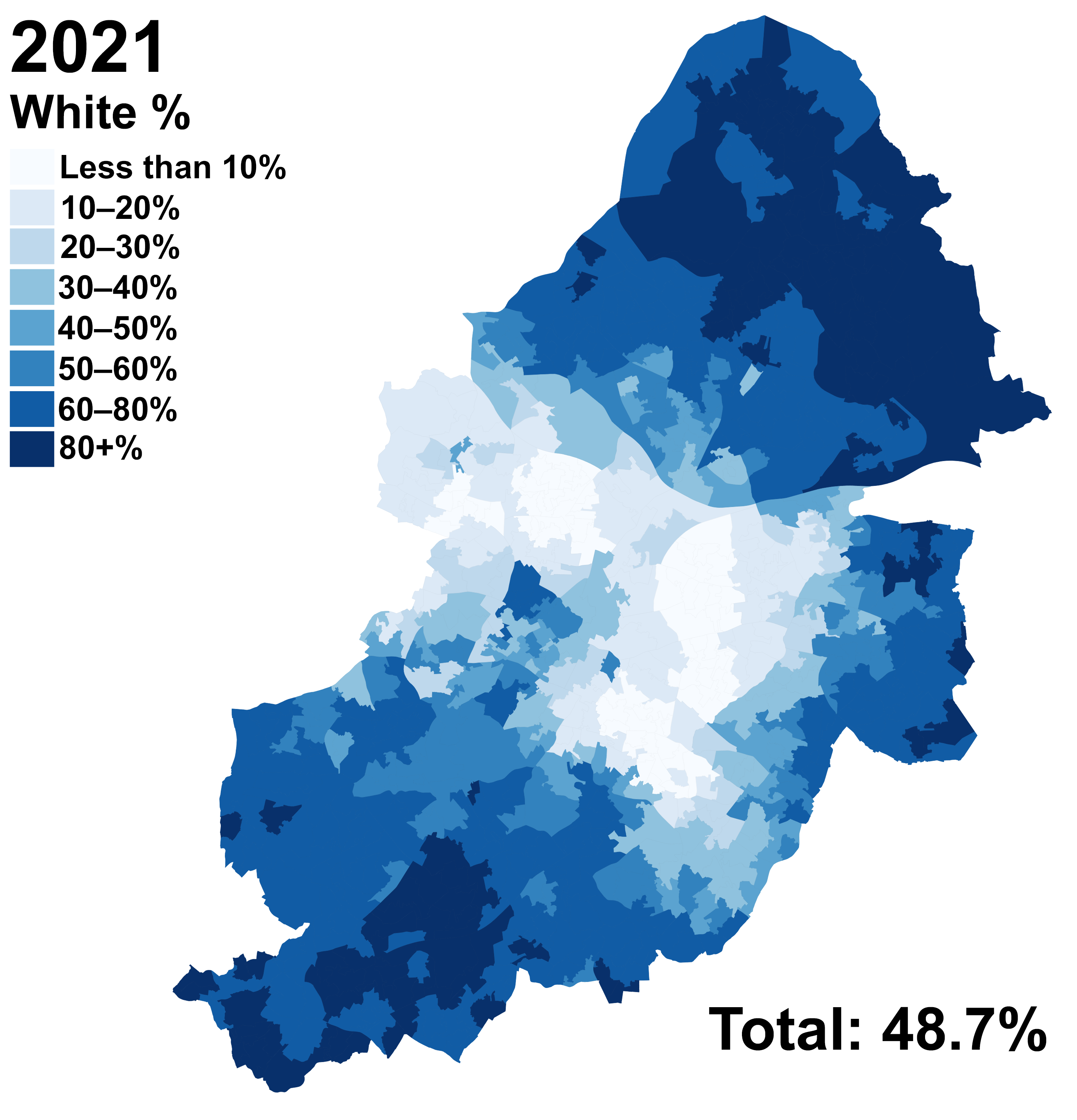
White (48.7%)

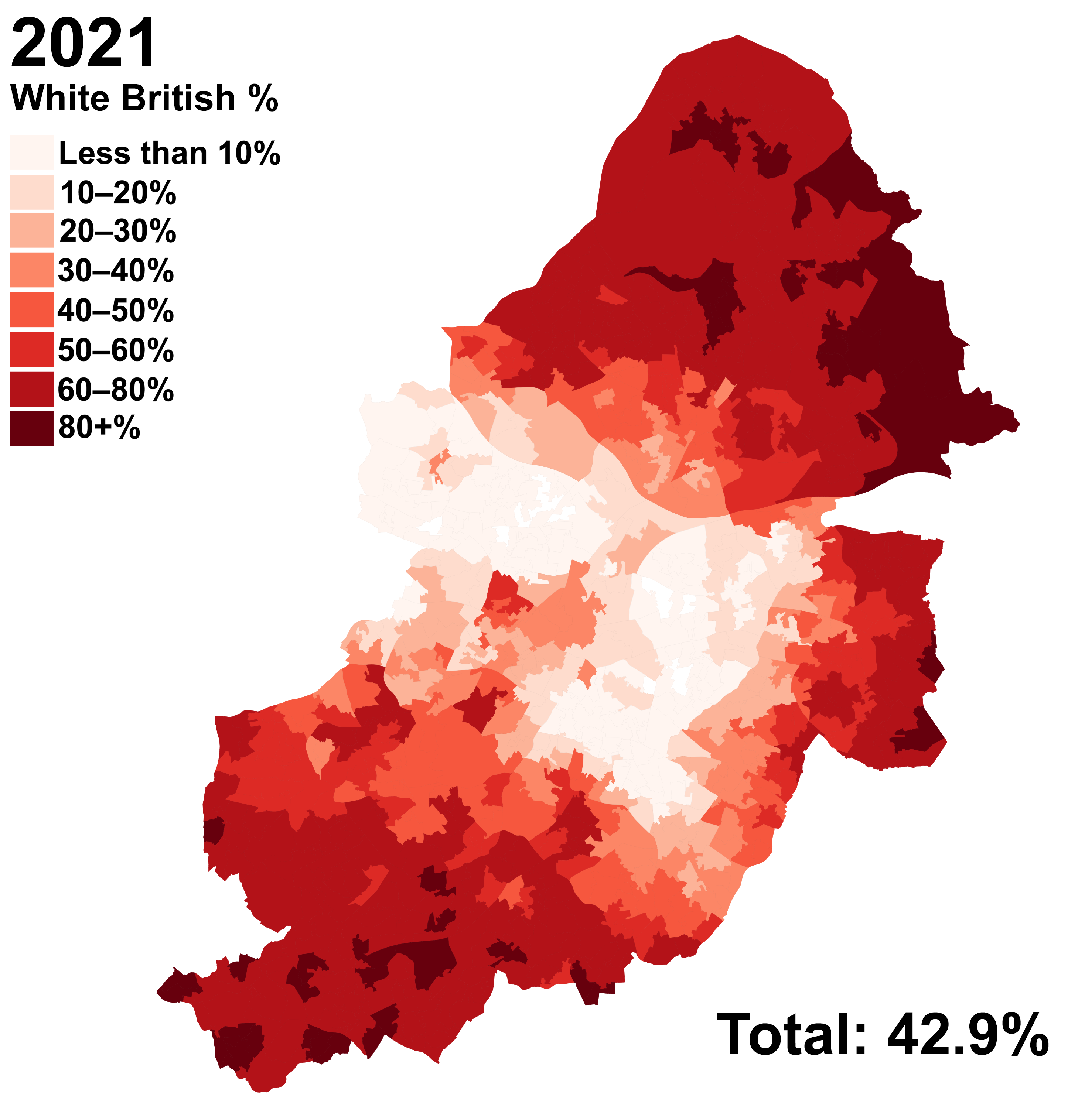
White British (42.9%)

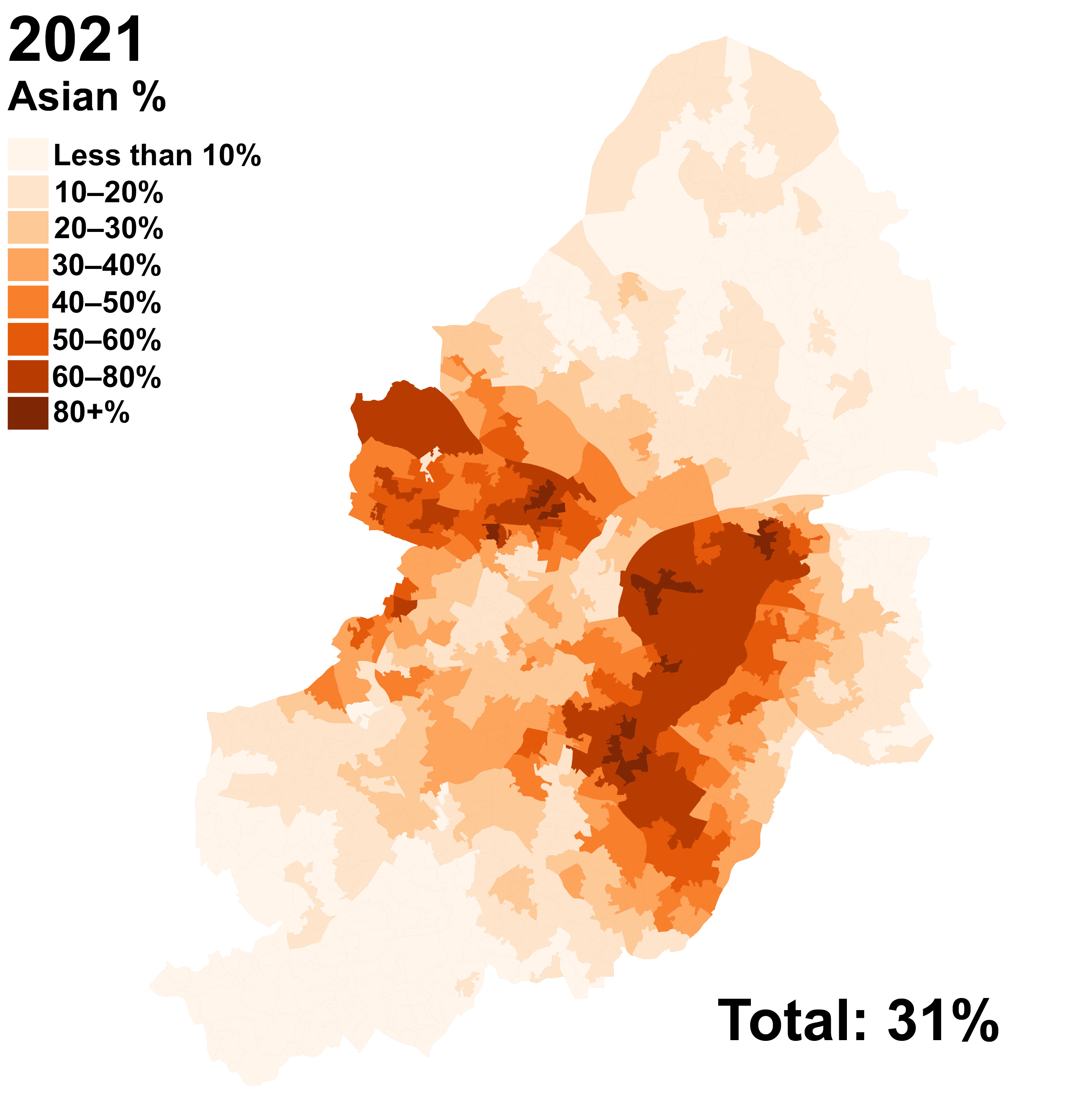
Asian (31%)

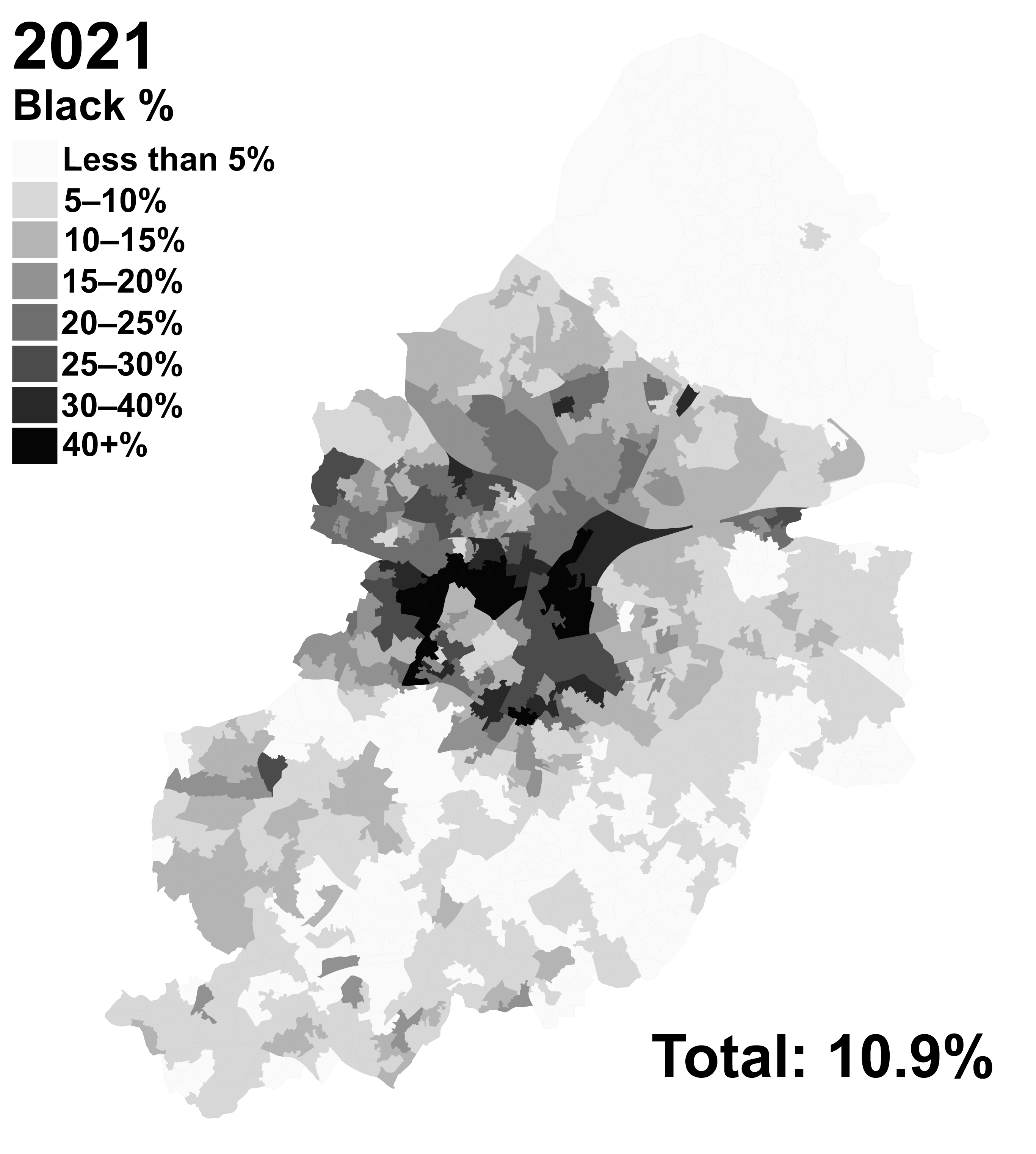
Black (10.9%)
Population pyramids of each ethnic group in Birmingham

White British

=== Detailed ===
The following table shows the 20 largest ethnic groups as identified by the residents of Birmingham in the 2021 census.

Detailed ethnicity
Ethnic category	Ethnicity	Population
White	English, Welsh, Scottish, Northern Irish or British	491,179
Asian	Pakistani or British Pakistani	195,102
Asian	Indian or British Indian	66,519
Asian	Bangladeshi or British Bangladeshi	48,232
Black	Caribbean	44,673
Black	African (unspecified)	25,161
Mixed/Multiple	White and Black Caribbean	25,119
Other	Arab	19,196
White	Irish	16,971
Black	Somali	16,964
Mixed/Multiple	White and Asian (unspecified)	13,130
Asian	Chinese	12,487
Black	British	9,411
White	Polish	8,407
Asian	Kashmiri	8,224
White	Romanian	7,364
White	European Mixed	7,138
Black	Nigerian	5,764
Asian	Afghan	5,293
Other	Sikh	4,842

These detailed ethnicities are based on the self-designation entries used in UK ethnicity classifications. Of the "White" ethnicities, after European Mixed (7,138) shown in the table above, the next largest were White unspecified (2,539), Other Eastern European (2,301), and Roma (1,833). After Afghan (5,293), the next largest in the "Asian" ethnicities include Filipino (2,311), Other/unspecified (1,778), Vietnamese (1,681) and Sri Lankan (1,672); there was also a population of 2,138 Iranians in the "Asian" category, however a significant number (1,857) self-identified under the "Other" category, instead of "Asian". Similarly, there were 1,297 Sikhs who identified themselves as "Asian", but a larger number (4,842) identified themselves as "Other".

The next largest entries of the "Black" ethnicity group, after Nigerian (5,764), were Eritrean (3,020), Other/unspecified (2,467), Somalilander (2,261) and Ghanaian (2,229). In the "Other" ethnic category, the largest groups after Sikh (4,842) were Kashmiri (4,086), Kurdish (3,540), and "Any other ethnic group" (2,360).

=== Ethnicity of school pupils ===
Ethnic group	School year													
Ethnic group	1971 estimations		1998/1999		2004		2008		2012		2015/16		2021/2022	
Ethnic group	Number	%	Number	%	Number	%	Number	%	Number	%	Number	%	Number	%
White: Total	–	84.9%	105,533	59.3%	80,070	52.6%	68,580	46.1%	60,585	39.8%	60,674	35.9%	65,246	31.6%
White: British	–	–	–	–	75,010	49.3%	63,923	43%	55,856	36.7%	53,490	31.7%	55,476	26.9%
White: Irish	–	–	–	–	2,010		1,609		1,018		753		508	
White: Traveller of Irish heritage	–	–	–	–	40		35		32		38		36	
White: Gypsy/Roma	–	–	–	–	20		24		119		733		1,048	0.5%
White: Other	–	–	–	–	2,990		2,979		3,558		5,660		8,178	4.0%
Asian / Asian British: Total	–	–	–	–	45,390	29.8%	50,696	34.1%	56,754	37.3%	64,096	38%	77,890	37.7%
Asian / Asian British: Indian	–	–		6.8%	9,440		8,884		8,724		9,224		10,798	5.2%
Asian / Asian British: Pakistani	–	–	29,364	16.5%	27,530	18.1%	32,121		37,209		42,108	24.9%	49,901	24.2%
Asian / Asian British: Bangladeshi	–	–		3.6%	5,890		6,858		8,214		9,484		12,124	5.9%
Asian / Asian British: Chinese	–	–			550		568		605		829		1,540	0.7%
Asian / Asian British: Other Asians	–	–			1,980		2,265		2,002		2,451		3,527	1.7%
Black / Black British: Total	–	–	–	–	13,470	8.8%	15,410	10.4%	17,455	11.5%	20,825	12.3%	26,015	12.6%
Black: Caribbean	–	–	11,567	6.5%	8,510		7,706		7,455		6,916		6,515	3.2%
Black: African	–	–			3,580	2.4%	6,173		8,274		11,727		16,903	8.2%
Black: Other Blacks	–	–			1,390		1,528		1,727		2,182		2,597	1.3%
Mixed / British Mixed	–	–	6,406	3.6%	8,890	5.8%	9,190	6.2%	10,550	6.9%	13,054	7.7%	19,950	9.7%
Other: Total	–	–	–	–	2,500	1.6%	3,593	2.4%	5,235	3.4%	7,742	4.6%	11,964	5.8%
Unclassified	–	–	–	–	1,930	1.3%	444	0.3%	1,591	1.5%	2,420	1.4%	5,304	2.6%
Ethnic minority: Total	18,549	15.1%	72,432	40.7%	72,180	47.4%	79,333	53.9%	91,585	60.2%	108,137	64.1%	141,123	68.4%
Total:	–	100%	177,965	100%	152,210	100%	148,640	100%	152,170	100%	168,811	100%	206,369	100%

Ethnicity of births

Ethnic Group	1981 estimates		2021	
Ethnic Group	Number	%	Number	%
White: Total	–	75%	5,058	34.9%
White: British	–	–	4,029	27.8%
White: Other	–	–	1,029	7.1%
Asian / Asian British: Total	–	–	5,595	38.6%
Asian / Asian British: Indian	–	–	759	5.2%
Asian / Asian British: Pakistani	–	–	3,417	23.6%
Asian / Asian British: Bangladeshi	–	–	708	4.9%
Asian / Asian British: Other Asians	–	–	711	4.9%
Black / Black British: Total	–	–	1,735	12%
Black: Caribbean	–	–	419	2.9%
Black: African	–	–	1,128	7.8%
Black: Other Blacks	–	–	188	1.3%
Mixed / British Mixed	–	–	1,455	10.1%
Other: Total	–	–	578	4.0%
Not stated	–	–	55	0.4%
Non-White: Total (not including Not stated)	–	25%	9,363	64.7%
Total:	–	100%	14,476	100%

== Country of birth ==
UK born and foreign born in Birmingham in 2021. Males and females representing the UK born population while foreign males and females representing the foreign born population.

Country of birth	Year															
Country of birth	1951		1961		1971		1981		1991		2001		2011		2021	
Country of birth	Number	%	Number	%	Number	%	Number	%	Number	%	Number	%	Number	%	Number	%
United Kingdom	1,054,806	94.9%	1,011,316	91.3%	883,610	87.1%	857,032	86%	823,351	85.7%	815,837	83.4%	834,732	77.8%	838,959	73.3%
Foreign born	56,946	5.1%	95,865	8.7%	131,060	12.9%	139,331	14%	137,728	14.3%	161,250	16.6%	238,313	22.2%	305,960	26.7%
Total	1,111,752	100%	1,107,181	100%	1,014,670	100%	996,363	100%	961,079	100%	977,087	100%	1,073,045	100%	1,144,919	100%

== National identity ==
Of Birmingham's residential population of 1,144,924 (2021 census), a large majority of 721,108 identified themselves as solely "British" and 119,732 identified as "English", while 110,753 identified as "English and British". 2,826 identified as "Welsh", while 1,199 identified as "Welsh and British". 155,501 residents had a non-UK identity, while 27,015 had both a UK and non-UK identity.

== Languages ==
The most common main languages spoken in Birmingham according to the 2011 census are shown below.

Rank	Language	Usual residents aged 3+	Proportion
1	English	866,833	84.70%
2	Urdu	29,403	2.87%
3	Punjabi	21,166	2.07%
4	Bengali (with Sylheti and Chatgaya)	14,718	1.44%
5	Pakistani Pahari (with Mirpuri and Potwari)	10,827	1.06%
6	Polish	8,952	0.87%
7	Somali	8,139	0.80%
8	Arabic	6,921	0.68%
9	Pashto	6,123	0.60%
10	Gujarati	4,871	0.48%
11	Persian	3,031	0.30%
12	French	2,558	0.25%
13	Hindi	1,540	0.15%
14	Romanian	1,233	0.12%
15	Cantonese Chinese	1,198	0.12%
16	Tagalog/Filipino	1,186	0.12%
17	Portuguese	1,127	0.11%
18	Tigrinya	1,074	0.10%
19	German	1,009	0.10%
20	Tamil	999	0.10%
	Other	30,478	2.98%

It's worth bearing in mind that according to another study that references 2011 census data, Polish becomes the second most popular language, behind Punjabi, within the West Midlands Region, of which Birmingham is the largest constituent.

== Religion ==
Religious makeup of Birmingham in single year age groups in 2021

In 1938, there was roughly around 100 Sikhs and Muslims resident in Birmingham.

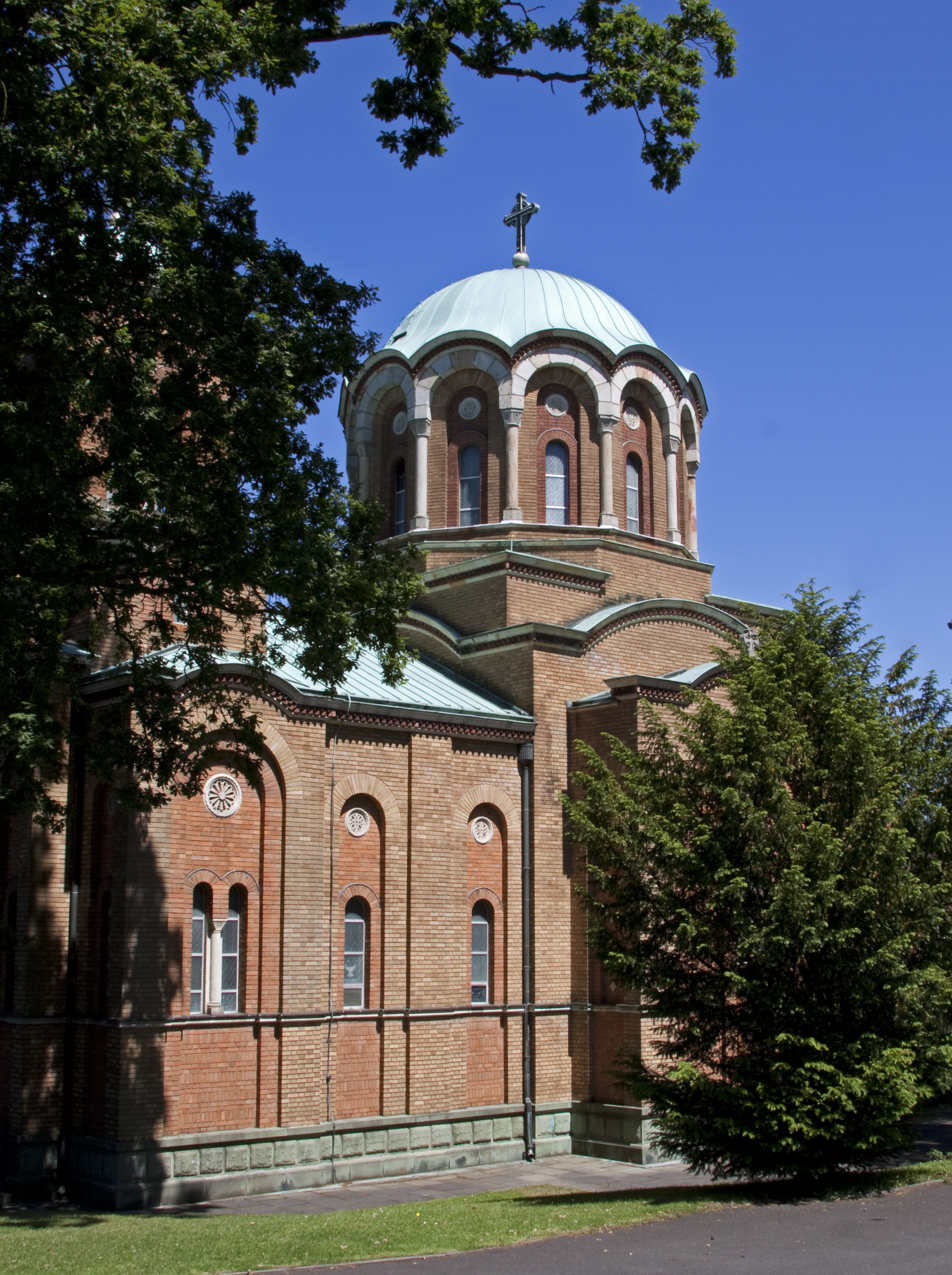
Serbian Orthodox Church in Bournville

In 2001, the main religion in Birmingham was Christianity, as 59.1% (577,783) of the population were Christians. The second largest religion was Islam, adhered to by 14.3%. Meanwhile, 12.4% of the population had no religion. 8.39% (81,959) did not state their religion, above the national average of 7.7%.

Birmingham's percentage of Christians is below the national, regional and county average. The percentage of Muslims in Birmingham is above the national, regional and county average, as are the Buddhist (0.3%) and Hindu (1.98%) percentages. The Sikh percentage, 2.93%, is higher than the national and regional percentage, yet below the county figure. The percentage of Jewish population in Birmingham (0.24%) is higher than the regional and county average yet almost half that of the national average.

There were only 21 out of 354 local authorities in England where the proportion of self-described Christians was lower than that of Birmingham. There were only six authorities with a higher percentage of Muslims. Birmingham's total Muslim population of 140,033 was the highest of any local authority area.

The majority of people classifying themselves in one of the White or Black ethnic groups said that they were Christian. At the same time, 29.6% (1,840) Black Africans and 10.8% (1,581) people from the White 'Other' ethnic group said they were Muslim. Over 90% of people in the Bangladeshi and Pakistani groups said they were Muslim. Indian people in the main, said they were Sikh (47.9%) or Hindu (32.7%) . Over 50% of Chinese people said that they had no religion and 18.3% were Buddhist. There were 42.6% (2,605) people from the 'Other' ethnic group who said they were Muslim and 26.6% (1,622) who said they were Christian.

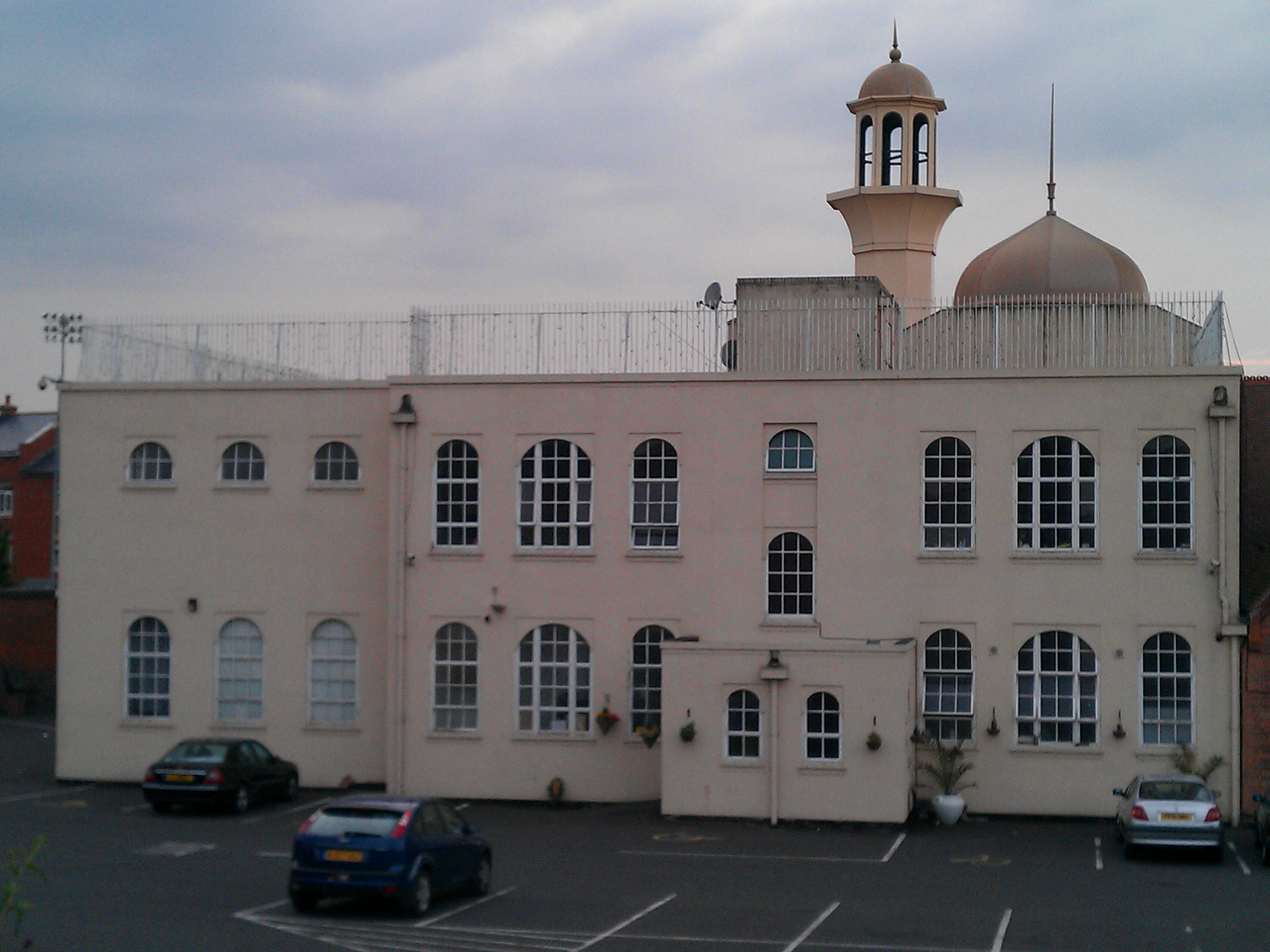
Darul Barakaat Mosque in Birmingham

The majority of Christians lived in the north, east and south of Birmingham, on the outskirts of the city, with far fewer living in inner-city areas. 51.7% of Birmingham's Hindu population lived in six wards of the city; Handsworth Wood (2,461), Springfield Sparkhill, Sparkrbook, Small Heath, Alum Rock, Ward End, Saltley, Bordesley Green, Washwood Heath, Stechford (2,023), Lozells and East Handsworth (1,761), Soho (1,699), Hall Green (1,224) and Sparkbrook (845). Almost 65% of Birmingham's Jewish population lived within five wards of Birmingham; Edgbaston (586), Selly Oak (361), Moseley and Kings Heath (321), Bournville (131) and Erdington (104). 71.7% of Birmingham's Muslim population lived in seven wards of Birmingham; Sparkbrook, Sparkhill, Small Heath, Alum Rock, Ward End, Saltley, (19,372), Bordesley Green (18,629), Washwood Heath, Stechford, (16,847), Springfield (13,461), Aston (12,381), Lozells and East Handsworth (10,853) Nechells and Bromford (8,822), all inner-city wards. The majority of Sikhs were found to live in the west and south east of the city. The ward with the highest proportion of Buddhists was Edgbaston at 1.4% (257).

The following table shows the religion of respondents in estimations for 1991 and in the 2001, 2011 and 2021 censuses in Birmingham.

Religion	1980s estimations		1990s estimations		2001 census		2011 census		2021 census	
Religion	Number	%	Number	%	Number	%	Number	%	Number	%
Christian	–	–	–	–	577,783	59.13%	494,358	46.07%	389,406	34.0%
Muslim	–	–	80,461 (1991) to 100,000	8% to 9.9%	140,033	14.33%	234,411	21.85%	341,811	29.9%
Sikh	–	–	–	–	28,592	2.93%	32,376	3.02%	33,126	2.9%
Hindu	–	–	–	–	19,358	1.98%	22,362	2.08%	21,997	1.9%
Buddhist	–	–	–	–	2,977	0.30%	4,780	0.45%	4,340	0.4%
Jewish	5,000 (1985)	–	4,000 (1995)	–	2,343	0.24%	2,205	0.21%	1,687	0.1%
Other religion	–	–	–	–	2,501	0.26%	5,646	0.53%	6,367	0.6%
No religion	–	–	–	–	121,541	12.44%	206,821	19.27%	276,327	24.1%
Religion not stated	–	–	–	–	81,959	8.39%	70,086	6.53%	69,856	6.1%
Total	–	–	1,005,764	100%	977,087	100.00%	1,073,045	100.00%	1,144,917	100.00%

Distribution of religions in Birmingham according to the 2011 census.
Christianity

Islam

Sikhism

Hinduism

Buddhism

Judaism

Other religion

No religion

== Sexual orientation ==
Of all usual residents aged 16 or over (889,624) in the 2021 census, 779,053 of these identified as "Straight or Heterosexual". 11,968 identified as "Gay or Lesbian", 11,258 identified as "Bisexual", and 3,580 identified as any other orientation. 83,765 did not answer.

== Income and industry ==
Birmingham's industry over time

The majority of Birmingham works in the service industry, with manufacturing which used to take 50% of jobs collapsing in proportion of industrial sector in the latter half of the 20th century.

== Health ==
219,427 residents in Birmingham were said to be in 'Not Good Health' (2021 census).

=== Obesity ===
29% of the adult population are classified as obese, while the European average is 14%. A quarter of Birmingham's 11- and 12-year-olds are considered obese.

== Housing ==
The following table shows the accommodation type of all usual residents in households in Birmingham (2021 census).

Accommodation type	Population
Whole house or bungalow	927,835
Whole house or bungalow: Detached	141,217
Whole house or bungalow: Semi-detached	436,846
Whole house or bungalow: Terraced	349,772
Flat, maisonette or apartment	189,335
A caravan or other mobile or temporary structure	677

=== Tenure ===
Of 423,456 households as of 2021, a majority of 226,657 owned their home (of which 114,967 owned outright and 111,690 owned with a mortgage or loan or shared ownership). 196,799 households rented their home (of which 99,499 rented socially and 97,300 rented privately or live rent-free).

Tenure	1981		1991		2001		2011		2021	
Tenure	Number	%	Number	%	Number	%	Number	%	Number	%
Owned	187,754	52.6%	224,804		232,771		230,556	56.1%	226,657	53.5%
Owned: outright			83,277		106,437		110,356		118,611	
Owned: with a mortgage or loan			141,527		129,772		120,200		108,046	
Privately renting	31,093	8.7%	29,495		46,154		73,405		95,719	22.6%
Lives rent free							7,183		1,580	
Social renting	137,963	38.7%	119,738		108,429		99,592		99,499	23.5%
Total	356,810	100%	374,037	100%	390,792	100%	410,736	100%	423,455	100%

=== Household composition ===
Of 423,456 households, 133,225 were one-person households, 243,037 were single family households, and 47,195 were other types of households.

== See also ==
- Demographics of the West Midlands County
- Demographics of England
- Demographics of the United Kingdom
- Religion in Birmingham
