= Demographics of Bradford =

- Population pyramid of Bradford
- Population: 522,452 (2011)

Population density in the 2011 census in the Bradford Metropolitan District Council area.

Bradford is an ethnically and culturally diverse city in the English county of West Yorkshire.

== Definitions ==
Bradford can refer both to the historical city itself, which no longer has a formal boundary, and to the current administrative metropolitan borough of the City of Bradford. This is the sixth most populous local authority district in the United Kingdom. In addition to the city of Bradford itself, this includes substantial rural and moorland areas, together with the towns and villages of Keighley, Shipley, Bingley, Ilkley, Haworth, Silsden, Queensbury, Thornton and Denholme.

The Office for National Statistics also identifies a "Bradford built-up area subdivision", defined by its own algorithm, as a subset of the City of Bradford. It is a subdivision of the West Yorkshire Built-up Area.

Unless otherwise stated, statistics in this article refer to the metropolitan borough of the City of Bradford.

== Population ==
The City of Bradford has an areas of 370 km^{2} (140 sq mi), and the population, in the 2011 UK census, was 522,452. The population density was 1,428 people per square km.

The Bradford built-up area subdivision has an area of 81.74 km^{2} (31.56 sq mi), a 2011 population of 349,561 and a density of 4,280 people per square km.

== Ethnicity ==
Bradford has had a significant Pakistani population since post war migration began, making up around 25.5% of the population in the 2021 census. This increase in Pakistanis has generally provided the majority of the growth of the multi-ethnic group of Asian British people within Bradford. Around 63.9% of the population identify as White British. The black population of Bradford is small, making up 1.8% of the overall population.

Bradford's ethnic demography, 1971 to 2021

A population pyramid of Bradford by ethnicity in 2021

The ethnic makeup of Bradford by age groups in 2021

The following table shows the ethnic group of respondents in the 1991, 2001 and 2011 censuses in the City of Bradford.

Ethnic Group	Year															
Ethnic Group	1961 estimations		1964 estimations		1971 estimations		1981 estimations		1991 census		2001 census		2011 census		2021 census	
Ethnic Group	Number	%	Number	%	Number	%	Number	%	Number	%	Number	%	Number	%	Number	%
White: Total	–	–	–	–	421,351	94.2%	404,500	87%	386,025	84.4%	366,041	78.27%	352,317	67.44%	334,004	61.1%
White: British	–	–	–	–	–	–	–	–	–	–	355,684	76.06%	333,628	63.86%	309,912	56.7%
White: Irish	–	–	–	–	–	–	–	–	4,759	1.04%	3,479	0.74%	2,541	0.49%	2,139	0.4%
White: Gypsy or Irish Traveller (Note: New category created for the 2011 census)	–	–	–	–	–	–	–	–	–	–	–	–	433	0.08%	849	0.2%
White: Roma	–	–	–	–	–	–	–	–	–	–	–	–	–	–	1,583	0.3%
White: Other	–	–	–	–	–	–	–	–	–	–	6,878	1.47%	15,715	3.01%	19,521	3.6%
Asian or Asian British: Total	–	–	–	–	–	–	48,800	10.5%	62,963	13.79%	89,293	19.09%	140,149	26.83%	175,664	32.1%
Asian or Asian British: Indian	–	–	–	–	7,748	1.7%	12,900	2.8%	11,713	2.56%	12,504	2.67%	13,555	2.59%	14,429	2.6%
Asian or Asian British: Pakistani	7,000	1.6%	10,000	–	–	–	33,600	7.2%	45,280	9.9%	67,994	14.54%	106,614	20.41%	139,553	25.5%
Asian or Asian British: Bangladeshi	–	–	1,500	–	–	–	2,300	0.5%	3,653	0.79%	4,967	1.06%	9,863	1.89%	12,403	2.3%
Asian or Asian British: Chinese (Note: In 2001, listed under the 'Chinese or other ethnic group' heading.)	–	–	–	–	–	–	–	–	720	0.15%	896	0.19%	2,086	0.40%	1,345	0.2%
Asian or Asian British: Other Asian	–	–	–	–	–	–	–	–	1,597	0.34%	2,932	0.63%	8,031	1.54%	7,934	1.5%
Black or Black British: Total	–	–	–	–	–	–	6,200	1.3%	5,336	1.16%	4,333	0.93%	9,267	1.77%	10,978	2%
Black or Black British: African	–	–	–	–	–	–	–	–	610	0.13%	970	0.21%	4,993	0.96%	7,061	1.3%
Black or Black British: Caribbean	–	–	–	–	–	–	–	–	3,323	0.72%	3,038	0.65%	3,581	0.69%	2,614	0.5%
Black or Black British: Other Black	–	–	–	–	–	–	–	–	1,403	0.3%	325	0.07%	693	0.13%	1,303	0.2%
Mixed: Total	–	–	–	–	–	–	–	–	–	–	6,937	1.48%	12,979	2.48%	15,006	2.7%
Mixed: White and Black Caribbean	–	–	–	–	–	–	–	–	–	–	2,611	0.56%	4,663	0.89%	4,426	0.8%
Mixed: White and Black African	–	–	–	–	–	–	–	–	–	–	449	0.10%	875	0.17%	1,196	0.2%
Mixed: White and Asian	–	–	–	–	–	–	–	–	–	–	2,926	0.63%	5,677	1.09%	6,458	1.2%
Mixed: Other Mixed	–	–	–	–	–	–	–	–	–	–	951	0.20%	1,764	0.34%	2,926	0.5%
Other: Total	–	–	–	–	–	–	5,350	1.2%	3,020	0.66%	1,061	0.23%	7,740	1.48%	10,760	2%
Other: Arab (Note: New category created for the 2011 census)	–	–	–	–	–	–	–	–	–	–	–	–	3,714	0.71%	2,734	0.5%
Other: Any other ethnic group	–	–	–	–	–	–	5,350	1.2%	3,020	0.66%	1,061	0.23%	4,026	0.77%	8,026	1.5%
Ethnic minority: Total	–	–	–	–	26,195	5.8%	60,350	13%	71,319	15.6%	101,624	21.7%	170,135	32.6%	212,408	38.9%
Total	447,546	100%	–	–	451,753	100%	464,850	100%	457,344	100%	467,665	100%	522,452	100%	546,412	100%

Notes for table above

Distribution of ethnic groups in the Bradford Metropolitan District Council area in the 2011 census.
White

White-British

White-Irish

White-Other

Asian

Asian-Indian

Asian-Pakistani

Asian-Bangladeshi

Asian-Chinese

Black

Black-African

Black-Caribbean

Other-Arab
Population pyramids of ethnicities in Bradford in 2021

White British

Asian: Total

Asian: Pakistani

=== Ethnicity of school pupils ===
The ethnicity of school pupils within Bradford has been in flux, with the native White British population declining from a majority of 61.7% in 2004 to a minority of 40.1% of the total school pupil population. This shift has turned Bradford's schools into a majority-minority state, where there are no overall majorities. Asian British school children have risen from 33.1% of the school pupil population to a stagnate 42.7% in 2022, having declined the previous two years from 43.1% in 2020.

The largest group within this multi-ethnic amalgamation is British Pakistanis at 36.4% of the total school population. Black British school pupils have risen slightly from 1% to 1.9% with the majority of growth coming from Black Africans. Other groups such as Other ethnicities, Other Whites and Mixed people have also increased as well.

Ethnic group	School year																	
Ethnic group	1967		1971		1998		2004		2008		2012		2015/16		2019/20		2021/2022	
Ethnic group	Number	%	Number	%	Number	%	Number	%	Number	%	Number	%	Number	%	Number	%	Number	%
White: Total	–	93.3%	–	89.5%	52,325	69.3%	45,930	62.6%	41,380	56%	39,320	51.1%	40,978	48.7%	46,896	46.3%	46,157	45.5%
White: British	–	–	–	–	–	–	45,300	61.7%	40,027	54.2%	36,885	47.9%	36,629	43.6%	41,350	40.9%	40,577	40.1%
White: Irish	–	–	–	–	–	–	90		85		94		96	0.1%	115	0.1%	113	0.1%
White: Traveller of Irish heritage	–	–	–	–	–	–	20		21		36		31	0.0%	28	0.0%	37	0.0%
White: Gypsy/Roma	–	–	–	–	–	–	70		166		494		1,260	1.5%	1,140	1.1%	1,031	1.0%
White: Other	–	–	–	–	–	–	450	0.6%	1,082		1,809		2,962	3.5%	4,263	4.2%	4,399	4.3%
Asian / Asian British: Total	–	–	–	–			24,280	33.1%	28,387	38.4%	32,704	42.5%	36,353	43.3%	43,447	43.1%	43,268	42.7%
Asian / Asian British: Indian	–	–	–	–			1,790	2.4%	1,839		1,838		1,809	2.2%	1,982	2.0%	1,974	1.9%
Asian / Asian British: Pakistani	–	–	–	–			20,160	27.5%	23,241	31.5%	26,727	34.7%	30,674	36.5%	36,849	36.5%	36,841	36.4%
Asian / Asian British: Bangladeshi	–	–	–	–			1,750		2,141		2,518		2,851	3.4%	3,315	3.3%	3,153	3.1%
Asian / Asian British: Chinese	–	–	–	–			80		85		110		88	0.1%	98	0.1%	97	0.1%
Asian / Asian British: Other Asians	–	–	–	–			500		1,081		1,511		931	1.1%	1,203	1.2%	1,203	1.2%
Black / Black British: Total	–	–	–	–			700	1%	940	1.3%	1,015	1.3%	1,170	1.4%	1,762	1.7%	1,954	1.9%
Black: Caribbean	–	–	–	–			340		326		309		284	0.3%	252	0.2%	215	0.2%
Black: African	–	–	–	–			270	0.4%	488		577		815	1.0%	1,316	1.3%	1,515	1.5%
Black: Other Blacks	–	–	–	–			90		118		131		107	0.1%	194	0.2%	224	0.2%
Mixed / British Mixed	–	–	–	–	–	–	1,800	2.5%	2,390	3.2%	2,900	3.8%	3,903	4.6%	6,124	6.0%	6,550	6.5%
Other: Total	–	–	–	–			250	0.3%	557	0.8%	760	1%	961	1.1%	1,566	1.5%	1,880	1.9%
Unclassified	–	–	–	–	0	0.0%	430	0.6%	20	–	225	0.3%	592	0.7%	1,261	1.2%	1,500	1.5%
Non-White: Total	–	6.7%	–	10.5%	–	30.7%		37.4%		44%		48.9%		51.3%		53.7%		54.5%
Total:	–	100%	–	100%	75,557	100%	73,380	100%	73,860	100%	76,930	100%	83,993	100%	101,056	100%	101,309	100%

== Country of birth ==
The UK and foreign born population pyramid of Bradford in 2021

In 1966, the New Commonwealth foreign born population was around 13,410. In 1971, it was 20,700. Most of the Asian born population had come after 1962 in 1971, and 72% came to the city relatives or friends in the area.

County Borough of Bradford
Country of birth	Year							
Country of birth	1951 census		1961 census		1971 census		1981 census	
Country of birth	Number	%	Number	%	Number	%	Number	%
United Kingdom	–	–	–	–	–	–	–	–
Ireland	2,192		3,350		2,805		2,475	
Other Europe	5,729	2%	5,416	1.8%	4,795	1.6%	4,893	1.6%
Poland	2757		2303		1940		1927	
Russia	2750		2326		2025		1984	
Italy	222		787		830		982	
New Commonwealth and Pakistan	883	0.3%	6,219	2.1%	21,010	7.1%	26,511	8.9%
India	395	–	1,512		5,965		5,976	
Pakistan	140	–	3,457		11,080		15,303	
Bangladesh	–	–	–	–	–	–	884	
Caribbean	28	–	984		2,010		1,607	
Foreign born	–	–	–	–	–	–	–	–
Total	292,400	100%	295,900	100%	294,200	100%	298,600	100%

Metropolitan Borough of Bradford
Country of birth	Year					
Country of birth	1961 census		1981 census		2021 census	
Country of birth	Number	%	Number	%	Number	%
United Kingdom	–	95.4%	409,202	90.1%	444,478	81.3%
Foreign born	–	4.6%	44,990	9.9%	101,938	18.7%
Total	–	100%	454,192	100%	546,416	100%

== Languages ==
The most common main languages spoken in the City of Bradford in the 2011 census are shown below.

Rank	Language	Usual residents aged 3+	Proportion
1	English	424,527	85.31%
2	Punjabi	19,842	3.99%
3	Urdu	16,550	3.33%
4	Polish	5,526	1.11%
5	Bengali (incl. Sylheti and Chatgaya)	4,743	0.95%
6	Pashto	3,580	0.72%
7	Gujarati	2,638	0.53%
8	Arabic	2,398	0.48%
9	Slovak	2,162	0.43%
10	Kurdish	1,275	0.26%
11	Pakistani Pahari (incl. Mirpuri and Potwari)	1,048	0.21%
12	Latvian	985	0.20%
13	Russian	690	0.14%
14	Czech	642	0.13%
15	Tagalog/Filipino	640	0.13%
16	Persian	592	0.12%
17	Italian	564	0.11%
18	French	443	0.09%
19	Lithuanian	436	0.09%
20	Greek	382	0.08%
	Other	7,945	1.60%

== Religion ==
The religious makeup of Bradford by single year age groups in 2021. Blue is Christian, green is Muslim, and grey is no religion.

The following table shows the religion of respondents in the 2001, 2011 and 2021 censuses in the City of Bradford.

Religion	1980 estimates		1989 estimations		2001		2011		2021	
Religion	Number	%	Number	%	Number	%	Number	%	Number	%
Holds religious beliefs	–	–	–	–	367,518	78.58	381,876	73.09	362,291	66.3
Christian	–	–	–	–	281,236	60.14	239,843	45.91	182,566	33.4
Muslim	45,000	–	50,000	–	75,188	16.08	129,041	24.70	166,846	30.5
Sikh	–	–	–	–	4,748	1.02	5,125	0.98	4,834	0.9
Hindu	–	–	–	–	4,457	0.95	4,882	0.93	4,757	0.9
Buddhist	–	–	–	–	537	0.11	1,000	0.19	959	0.2
Jewish	–	–	–	–	356	0.08	299	0.06	254	<0.1
Other religion	–	–	–	–	996	0.21	1,686	0.32	2,074	0.4
No religion	–	–	–	–	62,266	13.31	108,027	20.68	154,305	28.2
Religion not stated	–	–	–	–	37,921	8.11	32,549	6.23	29,816	5.5
Total population	–	–	–	–	467,655	100.0	522,452	100.0	546,412	100.0

== Industry ==
Bradford's industry sectors, 1841 to 2011

Manufacturing in Bradford has collapsed since the middle half of the 20th century.

== See also ==
- Demographics of West Yorkshire
- Demographics of the United Kingdom
- Demographics of England
- Demographics of London
- Demographics of Birmingham
- Demographics of Greater Manchester
- List of English cities by population
- List of English districts by population
- List of English districts and their ethnic composition
- List of English districts by area
- List of English districts by population density
