= Demographics of Greater Manchester =

- Population pyramid of Greater Manchester
- Population: 2,685,400

Population density in the 2011 census in Greater Manchester

The demography of Greater Manchester is analysed by the Office for National Statistics and data is produced for each of its ten metropolitan boroughs, each of the Greater Manchester electoral wards, the NUTS3 statistical sub-regions, each of the Parliamentary constituencies in Greater Manchester, the 15 civil parishes in Greater Manchester, and for all of Greater Manchester as a whole; the latter of which had a population of 2,682,500 at the 2011 UK census. Additionally, data is produced for the Greater Manchester Urban Area. Statistical information is produced about the size and geographical breakdown of the population, the number of people entering and leaving country and the number of people in each demographic subgroup.

== Key statistics ==
Compared against the demographics of England, Greater Manchester's demographics are broadly inline with national averages on many topics. In terms of ethnicity, its Asian and British Asian population is considerably above the regional and national averages, as is the portion of residents who identify as Muslim. Compared against the demographics of the United Kingdom, Greater Manchester's ethnic minority population consists of 11.09% of the total population. NB. Information in the table on the right is from the 2001 census and not the most recent 2011 census.

As of 2020, the ONS estimates the population of the Greater Manchester Metropolitan County to be 2,835,686.

Industry sectors in Greater Manchester over time

== Population change ==
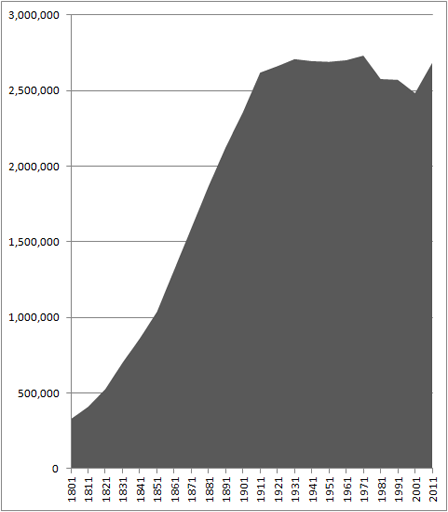
The population of Greater Manchester increased from around 328 thousand in 1801, to 2.5 million in 2001, peaking in 2011, at 2.7 million. 2011 census data shows a population of 2,685,400

The following is a table outlining population totals of the area for every ten years since 1801, using material from the census in the United Kingdom via the Great Britain Historical GIS; pre-1974 statistics were gathered from local government areas that now comprise Greater Manchester. The total population of Greater Manchester is predicted to grow to around 2,950,000 by 2031, with the City of Manchester alone accounting for 36% of the growth.

Historical populations

Year	Population	±%
1801	328,609	—
1811	409,464	+24.6%
1821	526,230	+28.5%
1831	700,486	+33.1%
1841	860,413	+22.8%
1851	1,037,001	+20.5%
1861	1,313,550	+26.7%
1871	1,590,102	+21.1%
1881	1,866,649	+17.4%
1891	2,125,318	+13.9%
1901	2,357,150	+10.9%
1911	2,617,598	+11.0%

Year	Population	±%
1921	2,660,088	+1.6%
1931	2,707,070	+1.8%
1941	2,693,775	−0.5%
1951	2,688,987	−0.2%
1961	2,699,711	+0.4%
1971	2,729,741	+1.1%
1981	2,575,441	−5.7%
1991	2,569,700	−0.2%
2001	2,482,352	−3.4%
2011	2,685,400	+8.2%
2021	2,867,752	+6.8%

Source: A Vision of Britain through Time.

== Boroughs ==
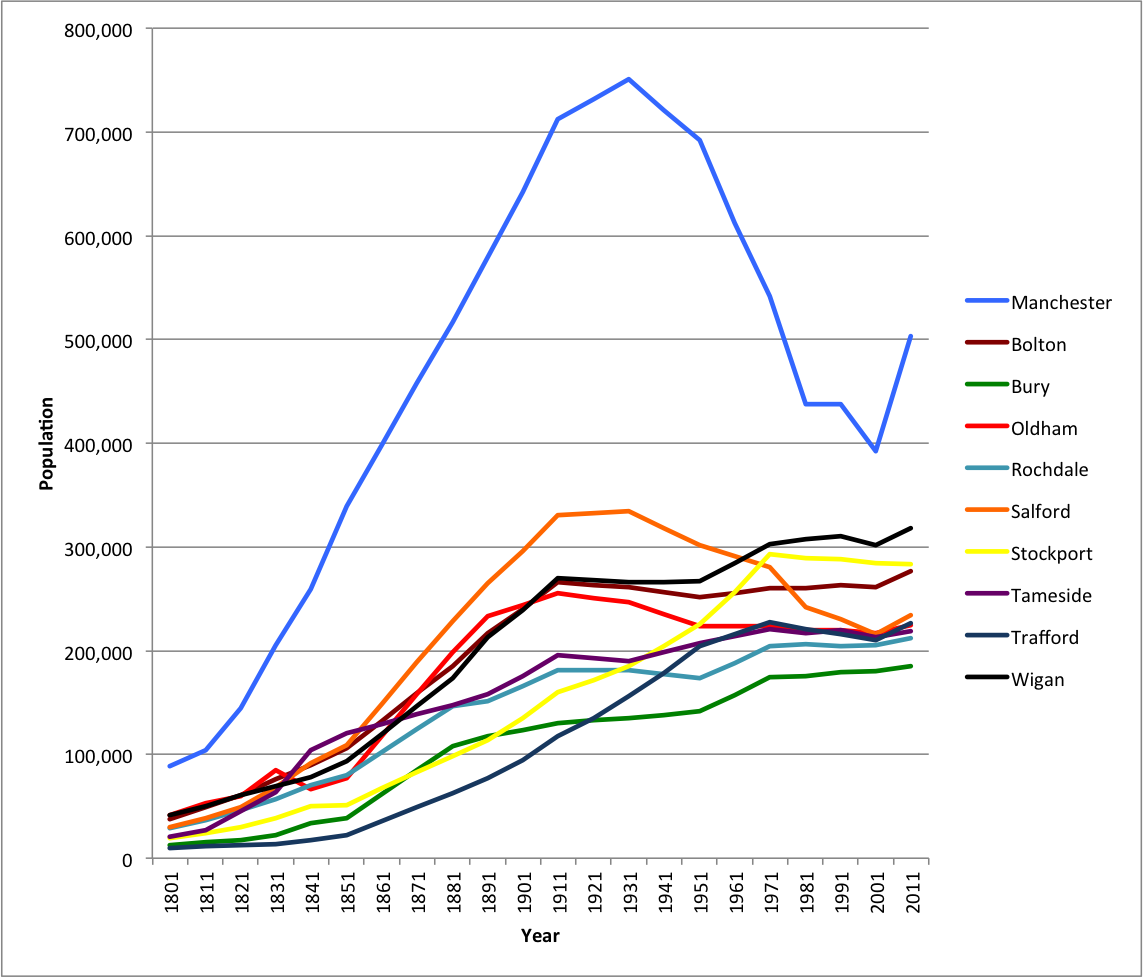
Manchester has always been vastly more populous than any other district of Greater Manchester.

According to the 2011 census, of Greater Manchester's ten metropolitan boroughs, the City of Manchester is the most populous with a population of 503,127, whilst the Metropolitan Borough of Bury is the least populous with 185,100. The city experienced the greatest percentage population growth outside London, with an increase of 19% to over 500,000. Manchester's population according to the 2021 census is 549,853, an increase of 9.2% from 2011. This represents a slower rate of growth than the previous decade.

In terms of ethnic composition, the City of Manchester has the highest non-white population in Greater Manchester (34th in England), followed by the metropolitan boroughs of Oldham (45th in England), Rochdale (53rd in England), and Trafford (68th in England). Wigan is the least ethnically diverse borough in the county, and 274th in England.

The Metropolitan Borough of Oldham is the borough with the highest proportion of people under fifteen years of age. Almost 12% of people in the Metropolitan Borough of Oldham are of South Asian heritage, the highest proportion of a borough of Greater Manchester.

With greater affluence, a recent trend has seen some of the Pakistani community move out of the inner city into more spacious suburbs. In South Manchester this means that they have been moving from Longsight/Levenshulme to more suburban areas such as Cheadle, Chorlton and Heaton Mersey. The inner city areas that are being left are generally filled with newer immigrants from places like Iran, Afghanistan and Poland.

Rank; 2011	Rank; 2001	Metropolitan district	Population in 2011	Change 2001–2011
1	1	Manchester	503,127	▲28.1%
2	2	Wigan	317,800	▲5.4%
3	3	Stockport	283,300	▼0.4%
4	4	Bolton	276,800	▲6.0%
5	6	Salford	233,900	▲8.2%
6	8	Trafford	226,600	▲7.8%
7	5	Oldham	224,900	▲3.5%
8	7	Tameside	219,300	▲2.9%
9	9	Rochdale	211,700	▲3.2%
10	10	Bury	185,100	▲2.5%

Population pyramids of Greater Manchester's boroughs

Manchester

Wigan

Stockport

Bolton

Salford

Trafford

Oldham

Tameside

Rochdale

Bury

== Ethnicity ==
The following table shows the ethnic group of respondents in the 1991, 2001, 2011 and 2021 censuses in Greater Manchester.

Ethnic Group	Year											
Ethnic Group	1971 estimations		1981 estimations		1991 census		2001 census		2011 census		2021 census	
Ethnic Group	Number	%	Number	%	Number	%	Number	%	Number	%	Number	%
White: Total	–	97.9%	2,513,545	96%	2,414,417	93.9%	2,260,507	91.1%	2,248,123	83.81%	2,190,838	76.4%
White: British (Note: New category created for the 2001 census)	–	–	–	–	–	–	2,183,096	87.95%	2,141,687	79.84%	2,045,951	71.3%
White: Irish	–	–	–	–	–	–	42,646	1.72%	34,499	1.29%	30,907	1.1%
White: Gypsy or Irish Traveller (Note: New category created for the 2011 census)	–	–	–	–	–	–	–	–	1,523	0.06%	2,409	0.1%
White: Roma	–	–	–	–	–	–	–	–	–	–	3,274	0.1%
White: Other	–	–	–	–	–	–	34,765	1.40%	70,414	2.62%	108,297	3.8%
Asian or Asian British: Total	–	–	70,670	2.7%	108,651	4.2%	151,876	6.1%	272,173	10.15%	389,283	13.5%
Asian or Asian British: Indian	–	–	22,053		30,909		35,931	1.45%	53,461	1.99%	69,481	2.4%
Asian or Asian British: Pakistani	–	–	33,264		52,107		75,187	3.03%	130,012	4.85%	209,061	7.3%
Asian or Asian British: Bangladeshi	–	–	6,156		11,958		20,064	0.81%	34,186	1.27%	46,460	1.6%
Asian or Asian British: Chinese (Note: In 2001, listed under the 'Other ethnic group' heading.)	–	–	5,945		8,580		11,858	0.48%	26,079	0.97%	29,582	1.0%
Asian or Asian British: Other Asian	–	–	3,252		5,097		8,836	0.36%	28,435	1.06%	34,699	1.2%
Black or Black British: Total	–	–	25,416	1%	33,948	1.3%	29,747	1.2%	74,097	2.76%	134,114	4.7%
Black or Black British: African	–	–	4,071		5,638		16,233	0.65%	44,691	1.67%	98,557	3.4%
Black or Black British: Caribbean	–	–	14,119		18,371		10,255	0.41%	17,767	0.66%	19,711	0.7%
Black or Black British: Other Black	–	–	7,226		9,939		3,259	0.13%	11,639	0.43%	15,846	0.6%
Mixed or British Mixed: Total	–	–	–	–	–	–	32,901	1.3%	60,710	2.26%	86,520	3.1%
Mixed: White and Black Caribbean	–	–	–	–	–	–	13,104	0.53%	23,131	0.86%	27,906	1.0%
Mixed: White and Black African	–	–	–	–	–	–	4,860	0.20%	9,997	0.37%	16,379	0.6%
Mixed: White and Asian	–	–	–	–	–	–	8,547	0.34%	15,657	0.58%	23,005	0.8%
Mixed: Other Mixed	–	–	–	–	–	–	6,390	0.26%	11,925	0.44%	19,230	0.7%
Other: Total	–	–	9,467		13,577		7,297	0.29%	27,425	1.02%	66,997	2.4%
Other: Arab (Note: New category created for the 2011 census)	–	–					–	–	15,026	0.56%	27,322	1.0%
Other: Any other ethnic group	–	–					7,297	0.29%	12,399	0.46%	39,675	1.4%
Non-White: Total	–	2.1%	105,553	4%	156,183	6.1%	221,821	8.9%	434,405	16.2%	676,914	23.6%
Total	–	100%	2,619,098	100%	2,570,600	100.00%	2,482,328	100.00%	2,682,528	100.00%	2,867,752	100%

Notes for table above

1. New category created for the 2001 census
2. New category created for the 2011 census
3. In 2001, listed under the 'Other ethnic group' heading.
Distribution of ethnic groups in Greater Manchester according to the 2021 census.
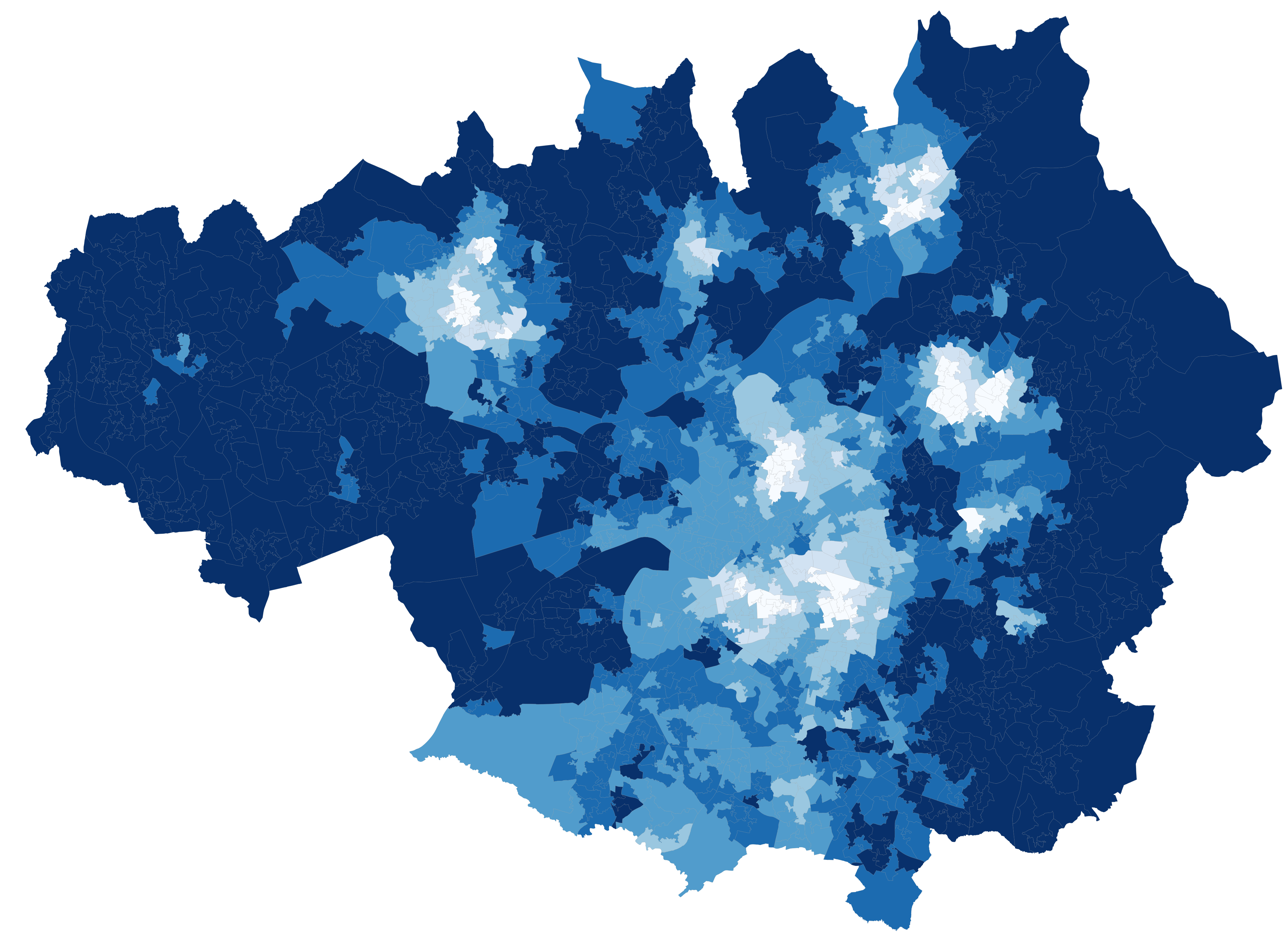
White

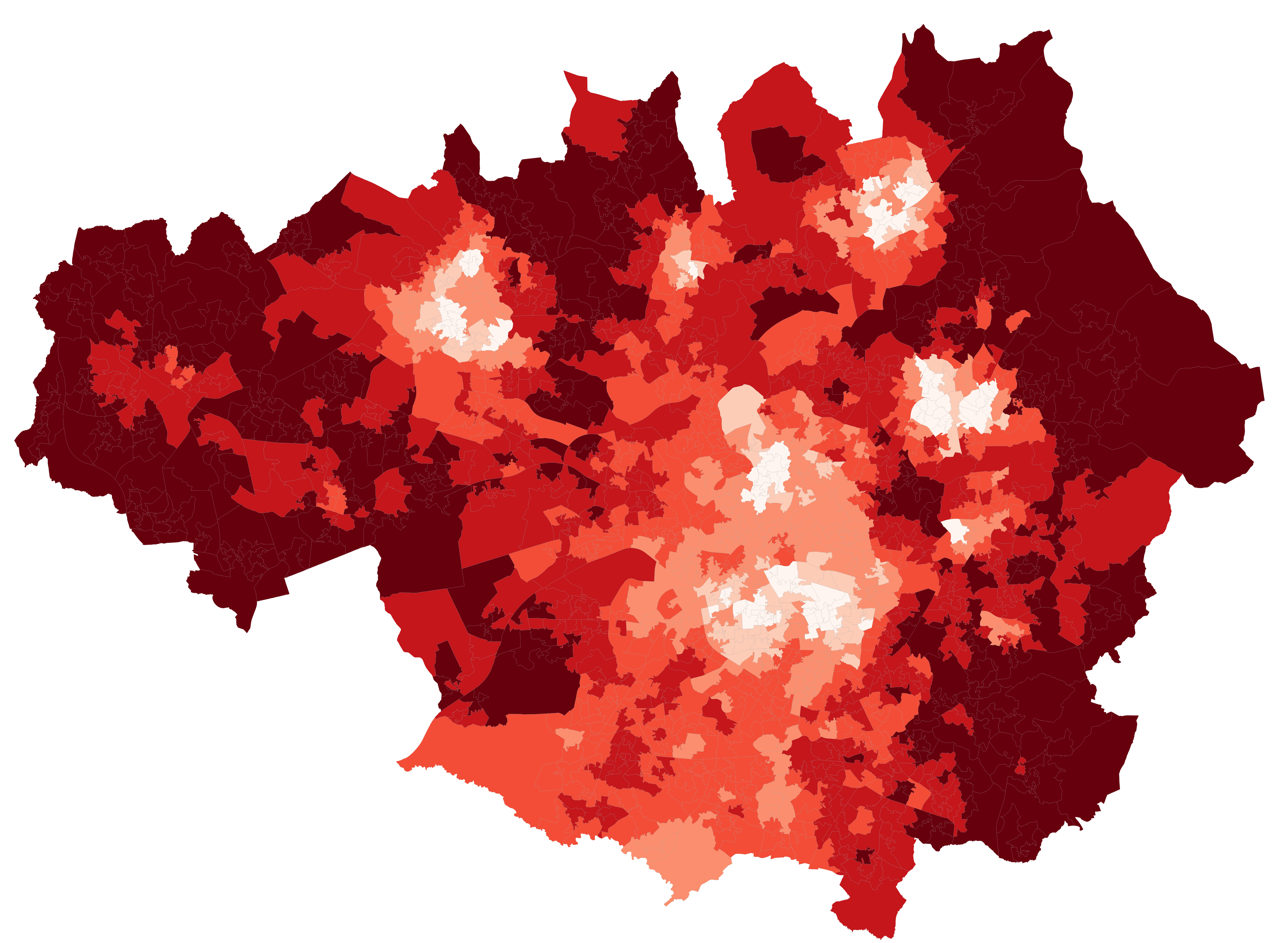
White-British

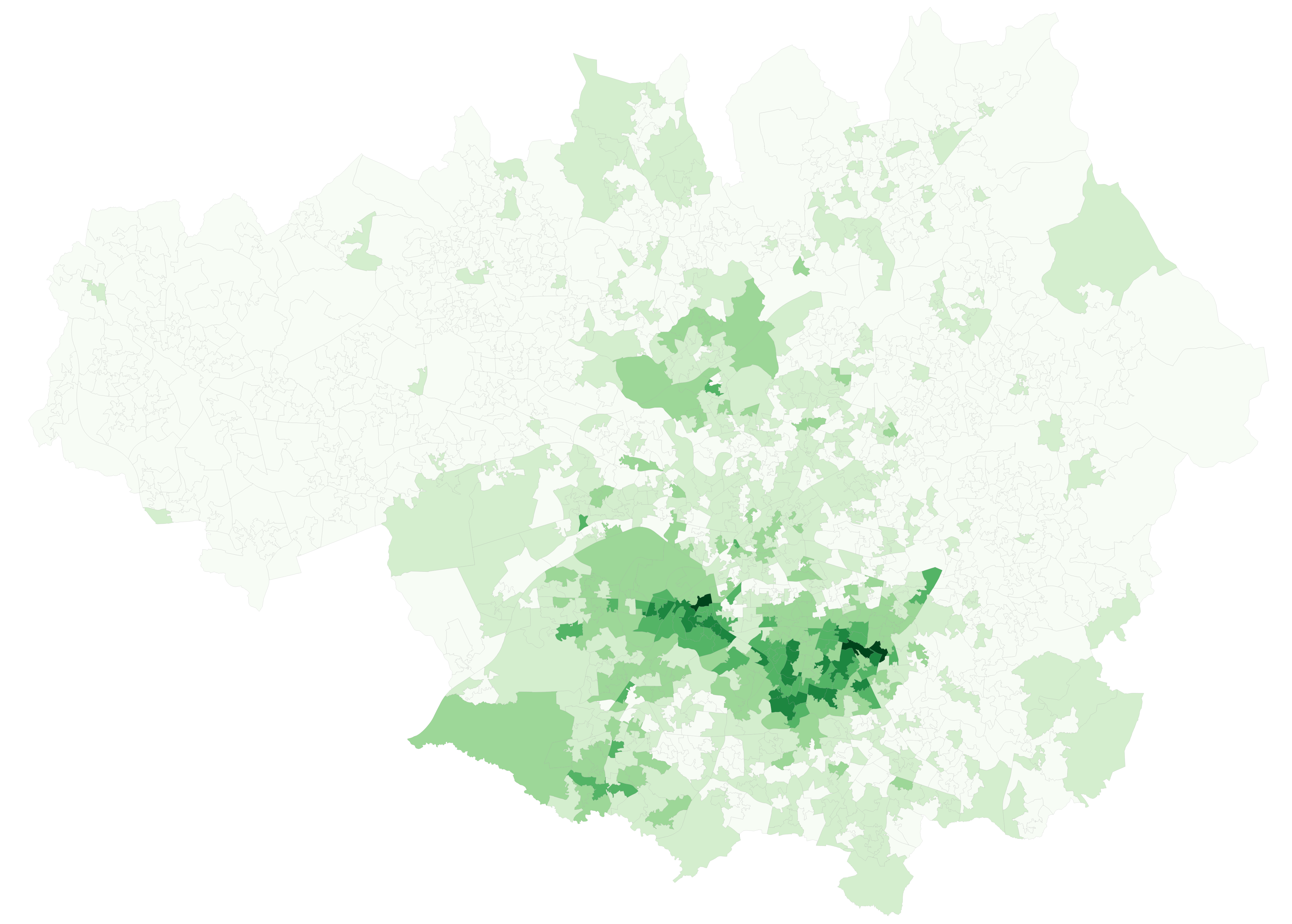
White-Irish

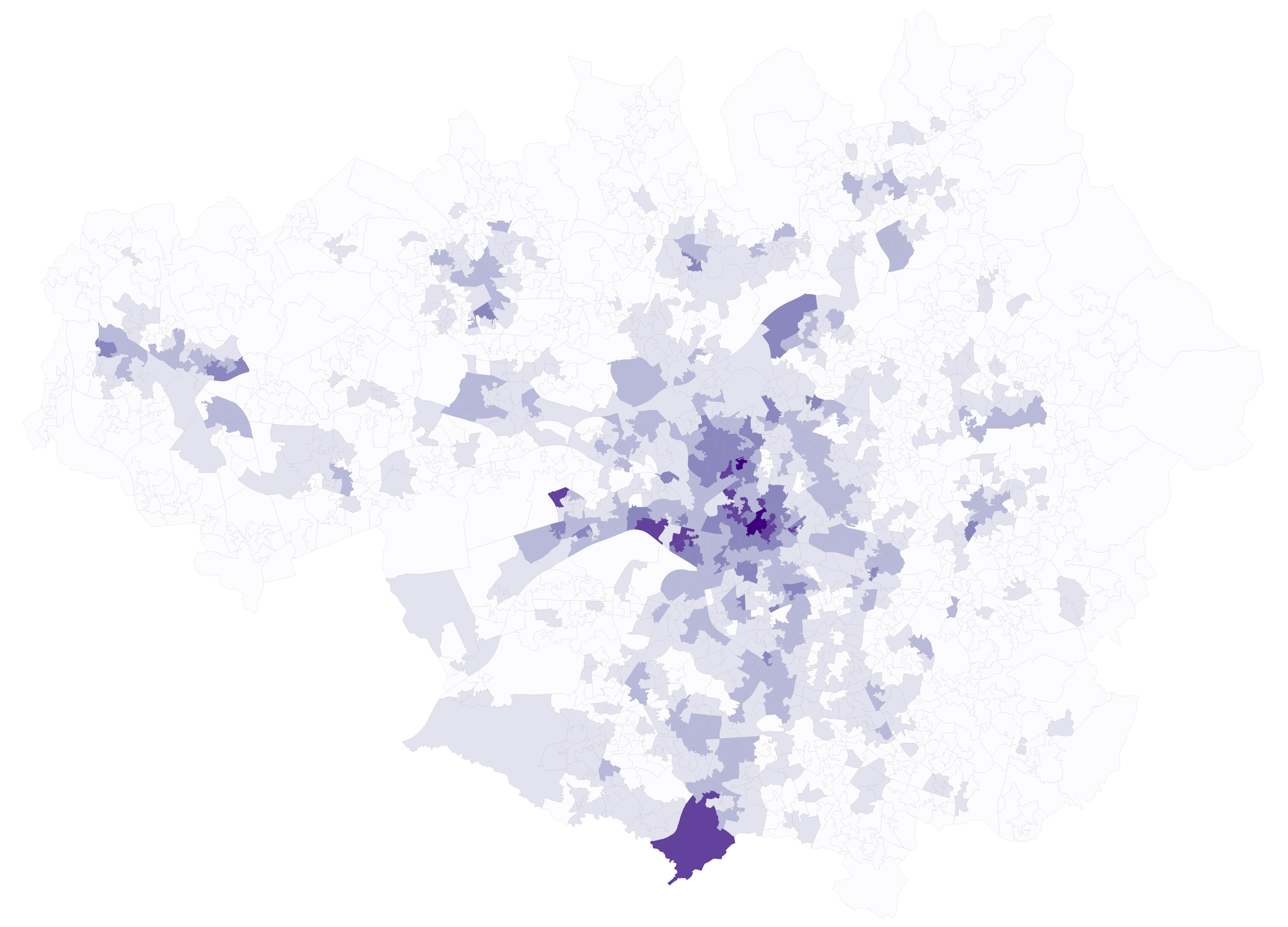
White-Other

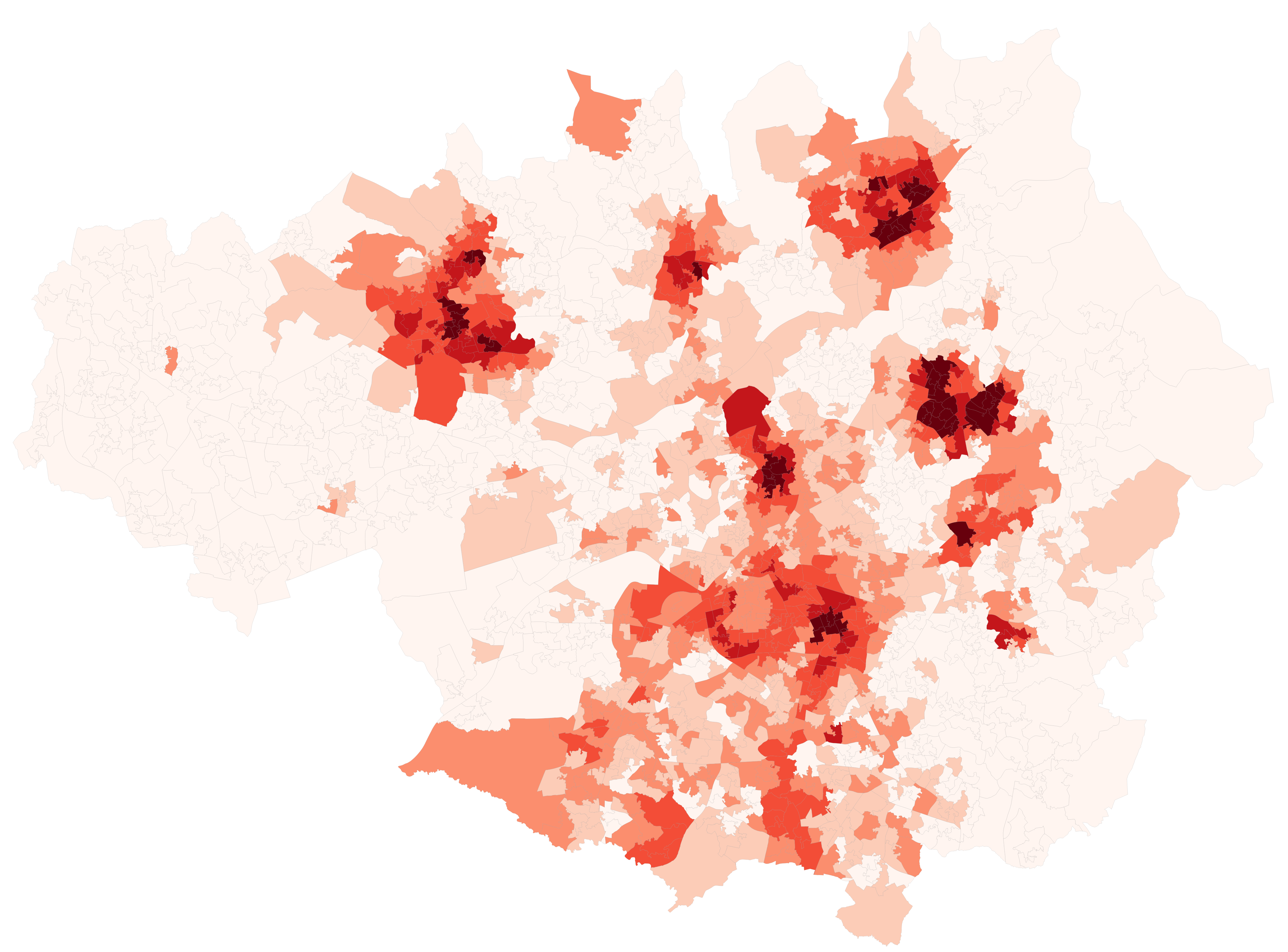
Asian

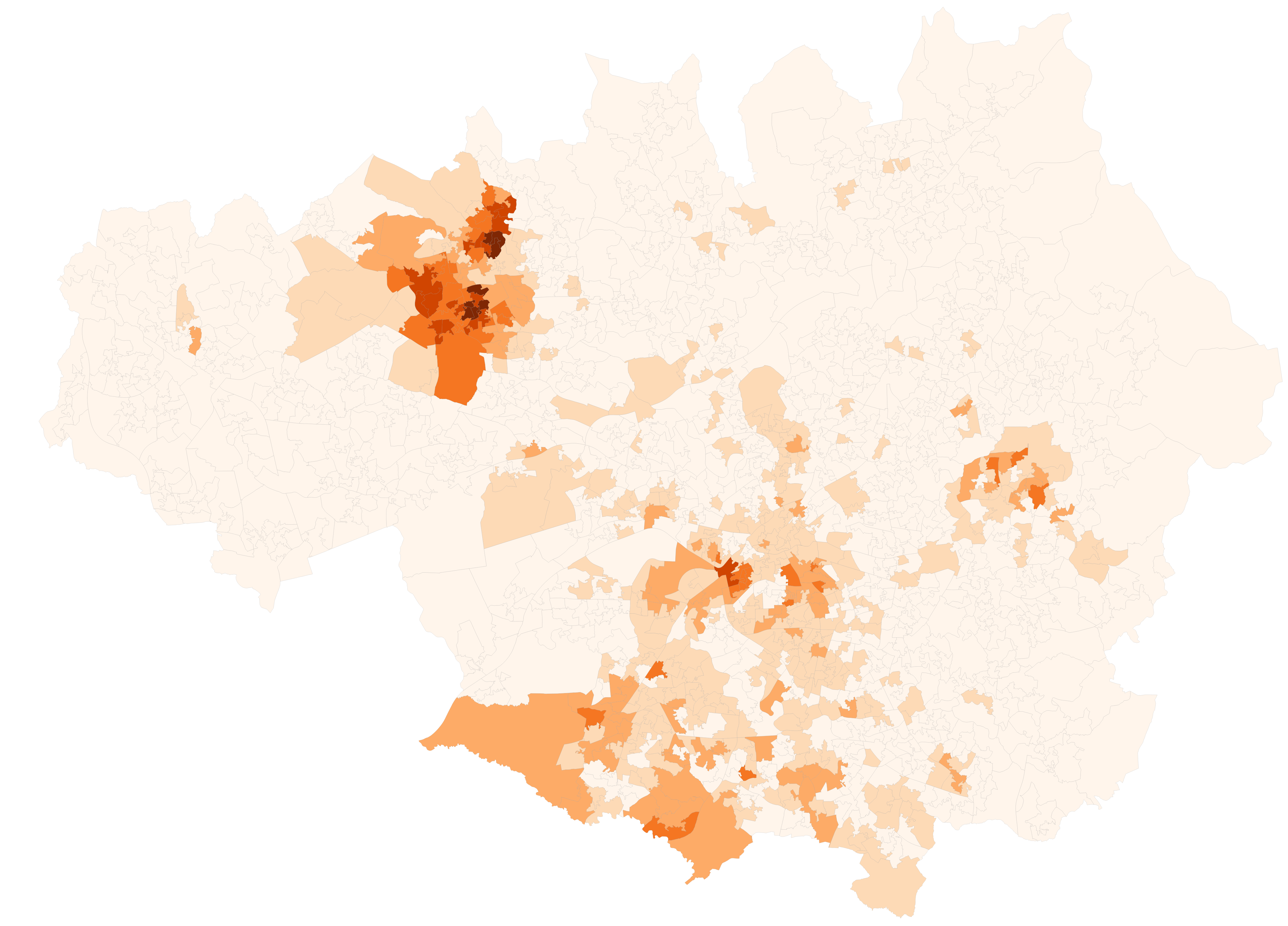
Asian-Indian

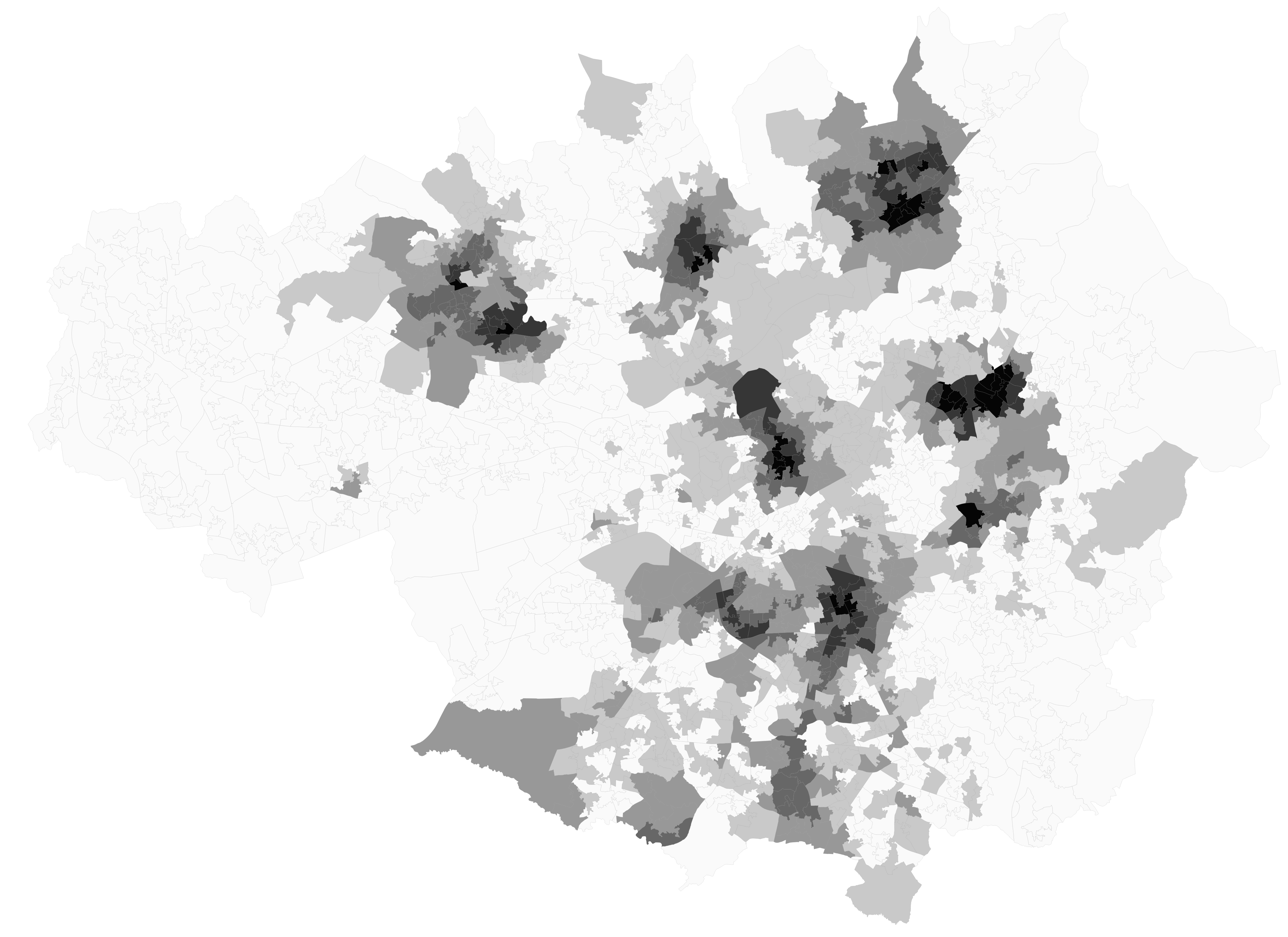
Asian-Pakistani

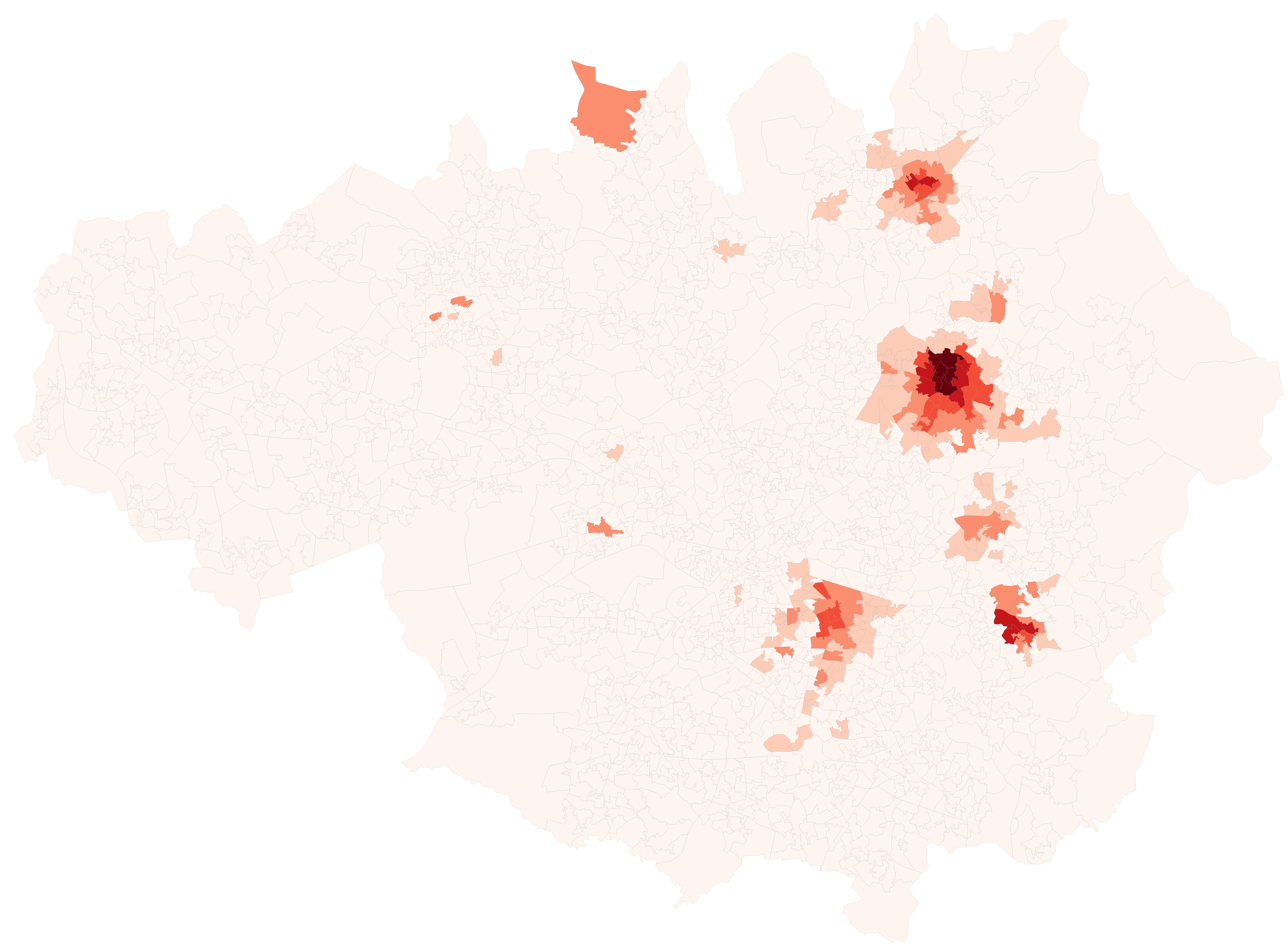
Asian-Bangladeshi

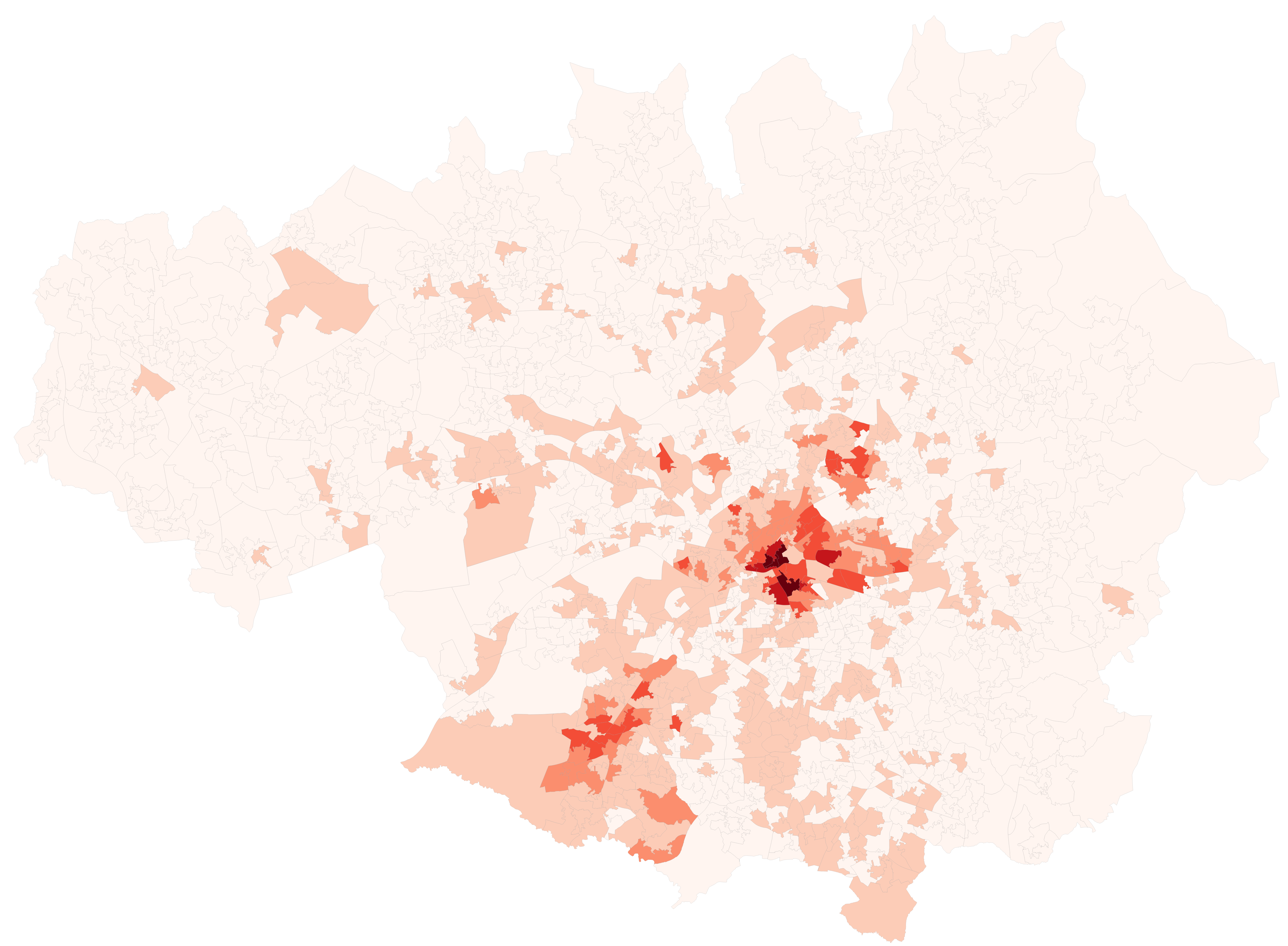
Asian-Chinese

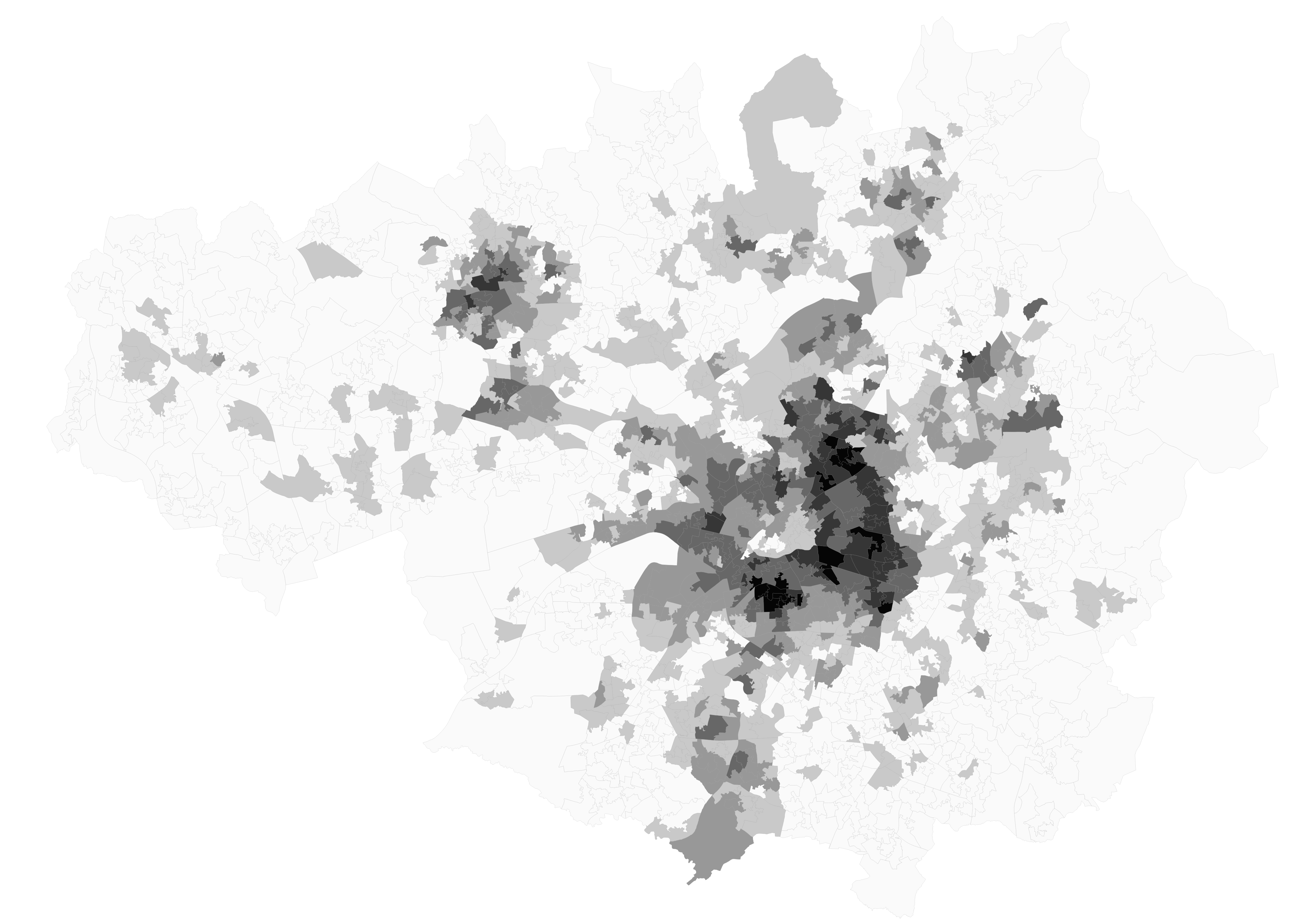
Black

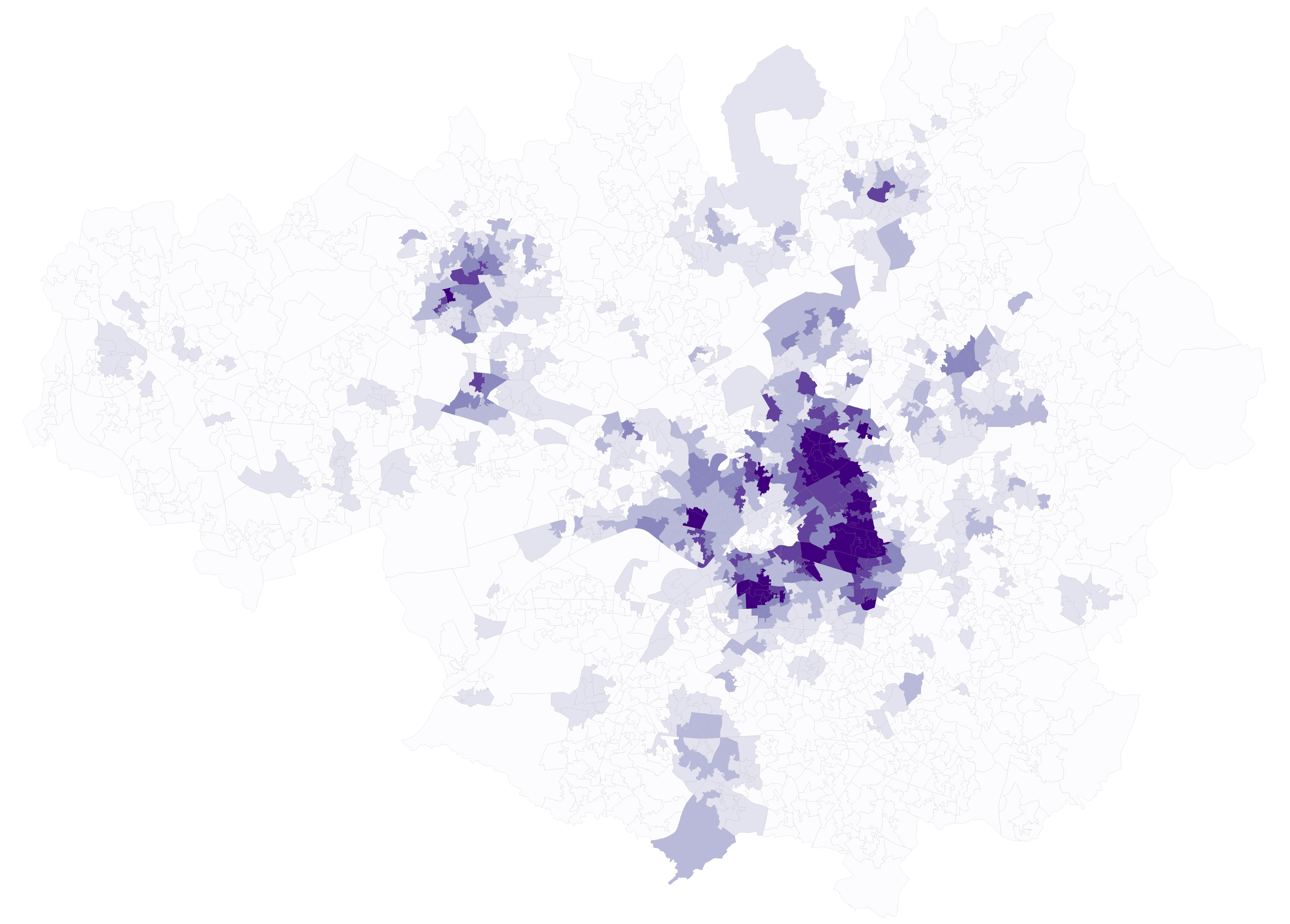
Black-African

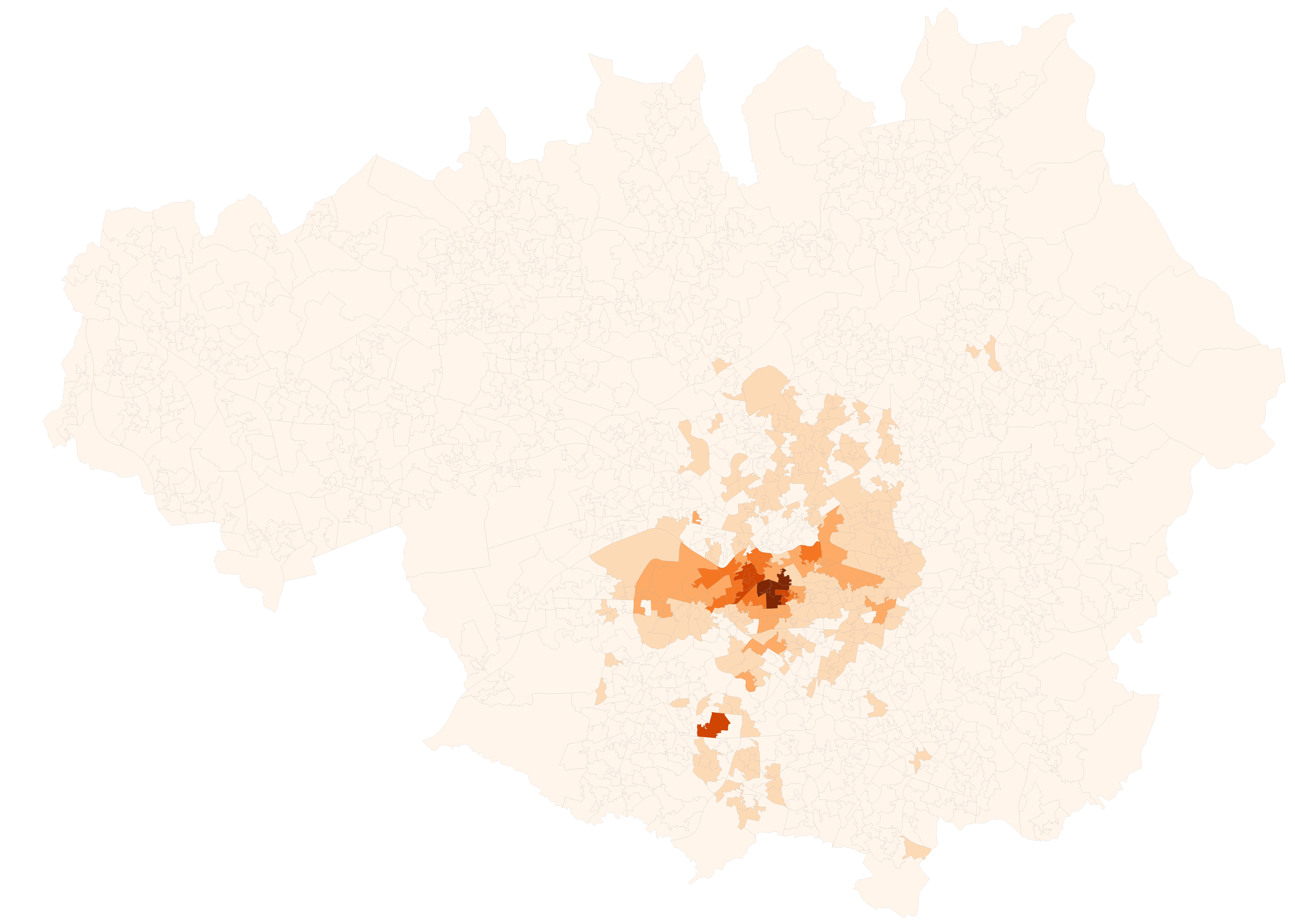
Black-Caribbean

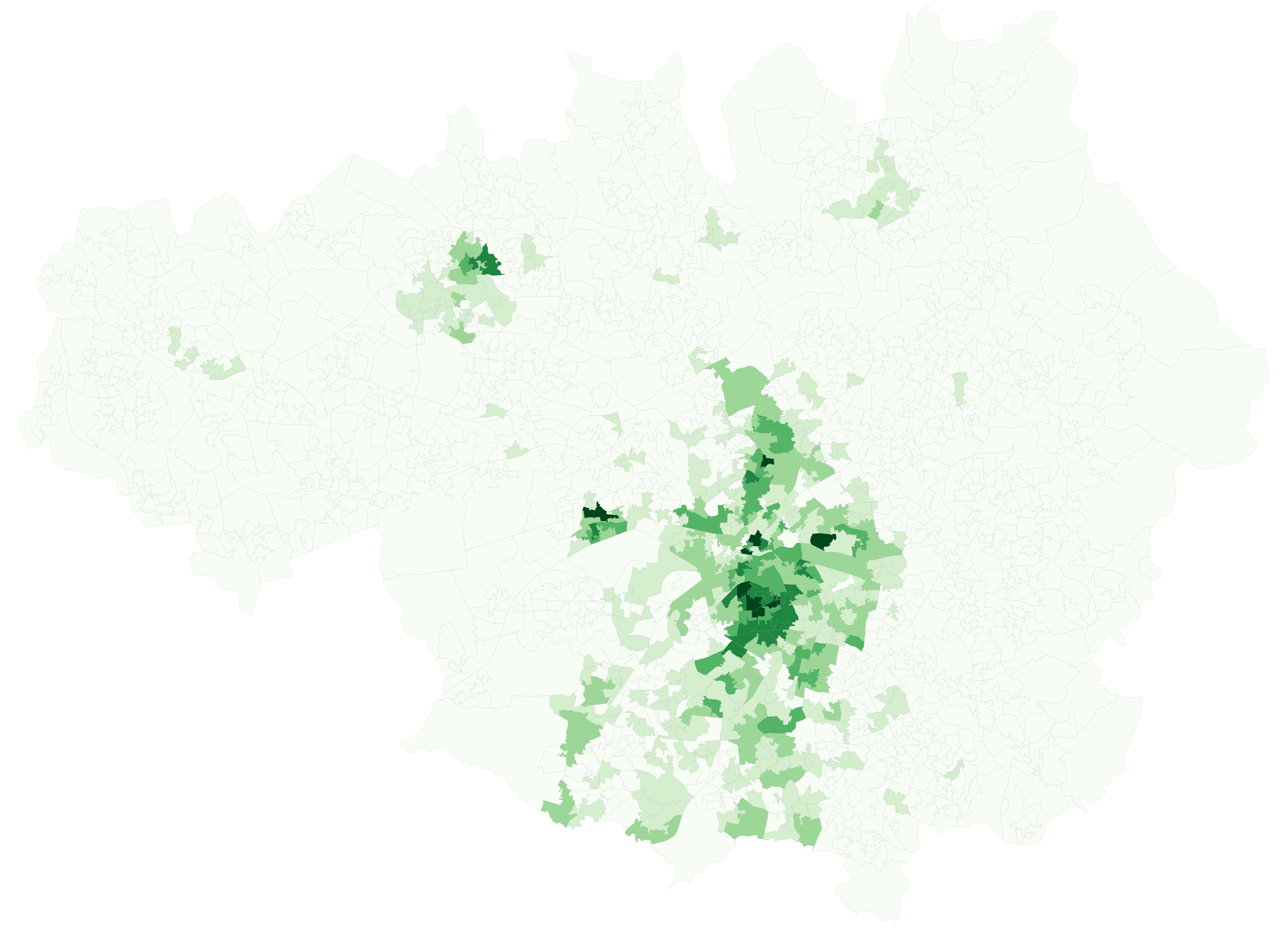
Other-Arab

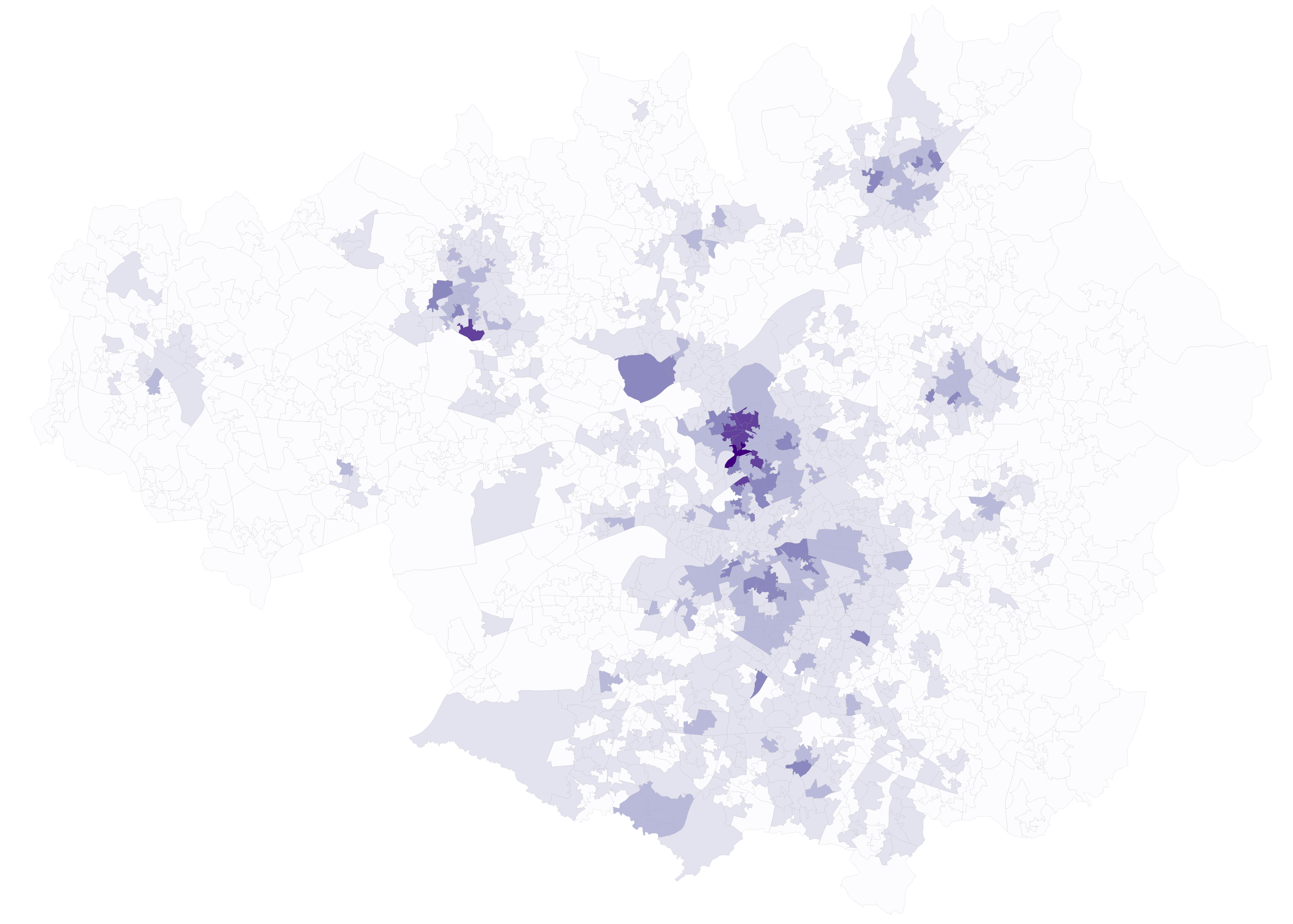
Other-Any Other Ethnic Group

== Languages ==
The most common main languages spoken in Greater Manchester according to the 2011 census are shown below.

Rank	Language	Usual residents aged 3+	Proportion
1	English	2,370,094	92.12%
2	Urdu	31,712	1.23%
3	Polish	21,231	0.83%
4	Bengali (with Sylheti and Chatgaya)	16,946	0.66%
5	Punjabi	16,189	0.63%
6	Gujarati	11,651	0.45%
7	Arabic	10,914	0.42%
8	Persian	5,654	0.22%
9	French	4,924	0.19%
10	Somali	3,868	0.15%
11	Kurdish	3,656	0.14%
12	Portuguese	3,620	0.14%
13	Cantonese Chinese	3,440	0.13%
14	Spanish	3,252	0.13%
15	Pashto	2,684	0.10%
16	Italian	2,292	0.09%
17	Greek	2,199	0.09%
18	Czech	2,129	0.08%
19	German	2,088	0.08%
20	Pakistani Pahari (with Mirpuri and Potwari)	1,991	0.08%
	Other	52,197	2.03%

== Religion ==
The following table shows the religion of respondents in the 2001 and 2011 censuses in Greater Manchester.

Religion	2001		2011		2021	
Religion	Number	%	Number	%	Number	%
Christian	1,840,599	74.15	1,657,594	61.79	1,347,104	46.97
Buddhist	5,156	0.21	9,555	0.36	9,529	0.33
Hindu	17,260	0.70	23,478	0.88	27,892	0.97
Jewish	21,733	0.88	25,013	0.93	28,075	0.98
Muslim	125,219	5.04	232,787	8.68	373,877	13.04
Sikh	3,720	0.15	5,322	0.20	7,353	0.26
Other religion	4,301	0.17	7,429	0.28	10,801	0.38
No religion	281,273	11.33%	557,129	20.77	915,592	31.93
Religion not stated	183,067	7.37%	164,221	6.12%	147,541	5.14
Total	2,482,328	100.00%	2,682,528	100.00%	2,867,752	100.00%

Distribution of religions in Greater Manchester according to the 2011 census.
Christianity

Islam

Judaism

Hinduism

Sikhism

Buddhism

Other religion

No religion

== Eurostat NUTS ==
In the Eurostat Nomenclature of Territorial Units for Statistics (NUTS), Greater Manchester is a level-2 NUTS region, coded "UKD3", which is subdivided into the "Greater Manchester South" (UKD31) and "Greater Manchester North" (UKD32) level-3 regions.

== Urban and metropolitan area ==
At the 2001 census, the population of the Greater Manchester Urban Area was 2,240,230. This area does not include some outliers within Greater Manchester, such as Wigan, but does extend into the adjacent counties of Lancashire and Cheshire. Eurostat has developed a harmonising standard for comparing metropolitan areas in the European Union and the population of the Greater Manchester Larger Urban Zone is 2,600,100; it occupies an area of 1,280 square kilometres (490 mi^{2}). The Greater Manchester LUZ is the second most populous within the United Kingdom, behind that of London, and sixteenth most populous within the EU.

== See also ==
- Demographics of the United Kingdom
- Demographics of England
- Demographics of London
- Demographics of Birmingham
- Religion in England
- List of English cities by population
- List of English districts by population
- List of English districts and their ethnic composition
- List of English districts by area
- List of English districts by population density
