= 1970 Urmston Urban District Council election =

1970 English local government election

← 1969	7 May 1970	1971 →

7 of 21 seats to Urmston Urban District 11 seats needed for a majority
	First party	Second party
Party	Conservative	Residents
Seats before	20	1
Seats won	7	0
Seats after	20	1
Seat change	Steady	Steady
Popular vote	6,860	0
Percentage	62.9%	0.0%
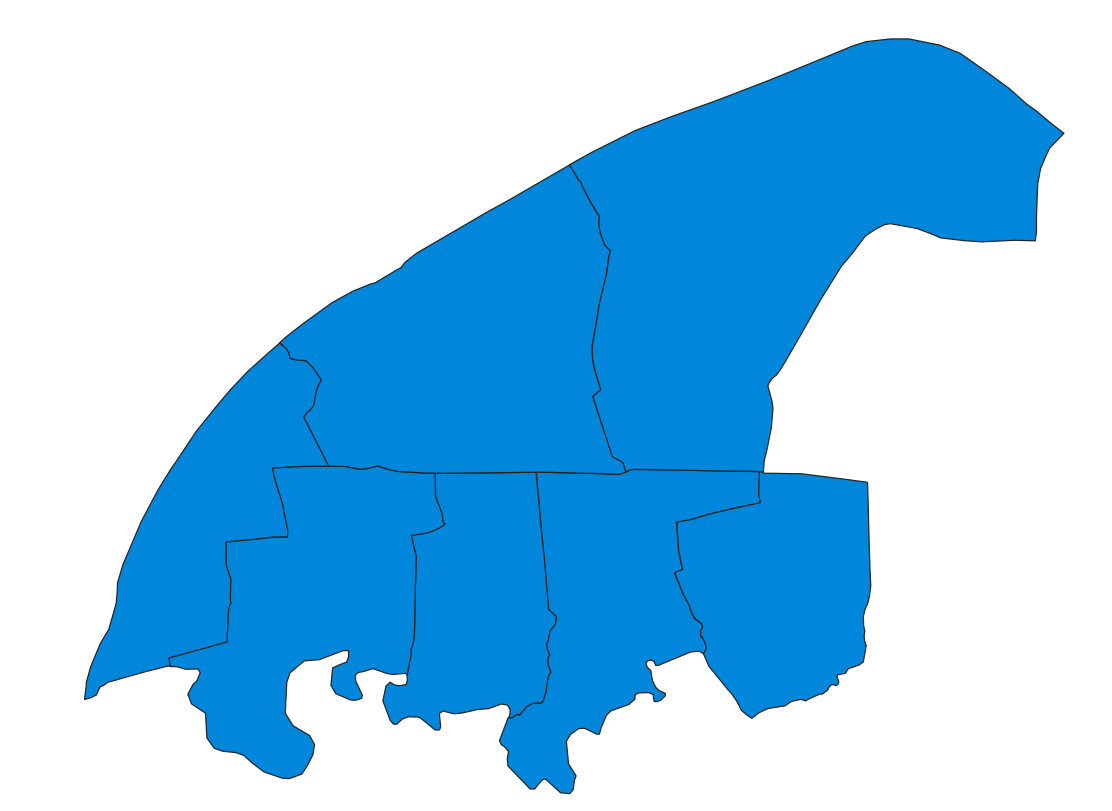
- Map of results of 1970 election
Leader of the Council before election
Conservative
Leader of the Council after election
Conservative

Elections to Urmston Council were held on Thursday, 7 May 1970. One third of the councillors were up for election, with each successful candidate to serve a three-year term of office. The Conservative Party retained overall control of the council.

== Election result ==
Party	Votes	Seats			Full Council	
Conservative Party	6,860 (62.9%)	7 (100.0%)	7 / 7	Steady	20 (95.2%)	20 / 21
Residents	0 (0.0%)	0 (0.0%)	0 / 7	Steady	1 (4.8%)	1 / 21
Labour Party	4,043 (37.1%)	0 (0.0%)	0 / 7	Steady	0 (0.0%)	0 / 21

↓
1	20

== Ward results ==
=== Davyhulme East ===
Davyhulme East
Party	Candidate	Votes	%	±%
Conservative	F. H. Eadie	951	67.1	
Labour	R. Phillips	466	32.9	
Majority		485	34.2	
Turnout		1,417		
Conservative hold		Swing		

=== Davyhulme West ===
Davyhulme West
Party	Candidate	Votes	%	±%
Conservative	G. H. Carnall*	1,228	66.5	
Labour	L. M. Seex	618	33.5	
Majority		610	33.0	
Turnout		1,846		
Conservative hold		Swing		

=== Flixton Central ===
Flixton Central
Party	Candidate	Votes	%	±%
Conservative	A. L. Brown*	980	62.8	
Labour	C. Jackson	580	37.2	
Majority		400	25.6	
Turnout		1,560		
Conservative hold		Swing		

=== Flixton East ===
Flixton East
Party	Candidate	Votes	%	±%
Conservative	H. Vaughan*	937	70.6	
Labour	F. Owen	390	29.4	
Majority		547	41.2	
Turnout		1,327		
Conservative hold		Swing		

=== Flixton West ===
Flixton West
Party	Candidate	Votes	%	±%
Conservative	R. F. Leech	952	52.7	
Labour	B. Elliott	855	47.3	
Majority		97	5.4	
Turnout		1,807		
Conservative hold		Swing		

=== Urmston East ===
Urmston East
Party	Candidate	Votes	%	±%
Conservative	J. J. Ward*	899	53.4	
Labour	A. M. Jones	784	46.6	
Majority		115	6.8	
Turnout		1,683		
Conservative hold		Swing		

=== Urmston West ===
Urmston West
Party	Candidate	Votes	%	±%
Conservative	E. J. Boardman*	913	72.3	
Labour	H. Seex	350	27.7	
Majority		563	44.6	
Turnout		1,263		
Conservative hold		Swing		
