= 1972 Urmston Urban District Council election =

1972 English local government election

← 1971	15 May 1972	1973 Trafford →

7 of 21 seats to Urmston Urban District 11 seats needed for a majority
	First party	Second party	Third party
Party	Conservative	Labour	Liberal
Last election	3 seats, 42.0%	3 seats, 47.2%	1 seats, 6.0%
Seats before	17	3	1
Seats won	6	1	0
Seats after	16	4	1
Seat change	▼1	▲1	Steady
Popular vote	7,467	5,692	0
Percentage	56.7%	43.3%	0.0%
Swing	▲14.7%	▼3.9%	▼6.0%
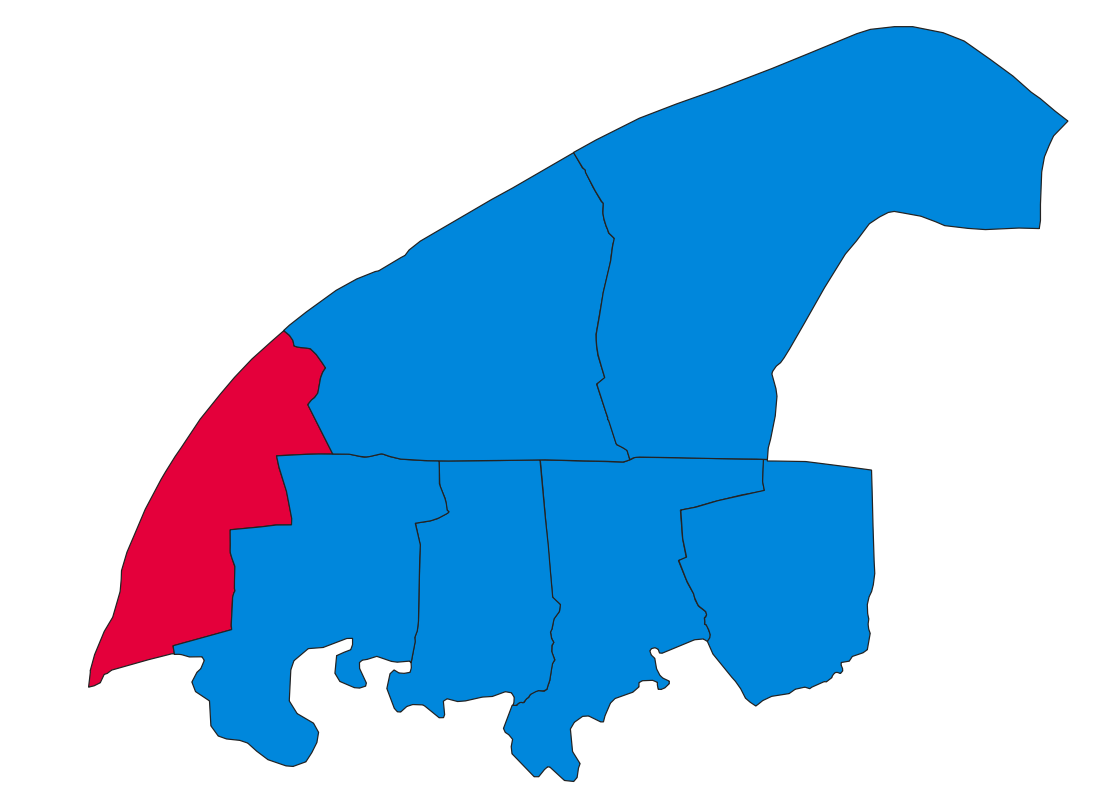
- Map of results of 1972 election
Leader of the Council before election
Conservative
Leader of the Council after election
Conservative

Elections to Urmston Council were held on Thursday, 4 May 1972. One third of the councillors were up for election, with each successful candidate to serve a two-year term of office. These were the final elections held in Urmston before it became part of Trafford. The Conservative Party retained overall control of the council.

== Election result ==
Party	Votes		Seats			Full Council	
Conservative Party	7,467 (56.7%)	▲14.7	6 (85.7%)	6 / 7	▼1	16 (76.2%)	16 / 21
Labour Party	5,692 (43.3%)	▼3.9	1 (14.3%)	1 / 7	▲1	4 (19.0%)	4 / 21
Liberal Party	0 (0.0%)	▼6.0	0 (0.0%)	0 / 7	Steady	1 (4.8%)	1 / 21

↓
4	1	16

== Ward results ==
=== Davyhulme East ===
Davyhulme East
Party	Candidate	Votes	%	±%
Conservative	R. Haigh*	1,214	58.0	+11.1
Labour	A. P. Beaver	880	42.0	−11.1
Majority		334	16.0	
Turnout		2,094		
Conservative hold		Swing		

=== Davyhulme West ===
Davyhulme West
Party	Candidate	Votes	%	±%
Conservative	E. Durant*	1,288	58.5	+7.9
Labour	C. Jackson	913	41.5	−7.9
Majority		375	17.0	+15.8
Turnout		2,201		
Conservative hold		Swing		

=== Flixton Central ===
Flixton Central
Party	Candidate	Votes	%	±%
Conservative	W. Wroe*	1,111	58.3	N/A
Labour	P. Hayes	796	41.7	+14.4
Majority		315	16.6	
Turnout		1,907		
Conservative hold		Swing		

=== Flixton East ===
Flixton East
Party	Candidate	Votes	%	±%
Conservative	T. Evans	1,168	66.0	+7.0
Labour	K. D. Barnes	603	34.0	−7.0
Majority		565	32.0	+14.0
Turnout		1,771		
Conservative hold		Swing		

=== Flixton West ===
Flixton West
Party	Candidate	Votes	%	±%
Labour	A. Stringer	1,031	57.2	−4.0
Conservative	G. B. Lumby	772	42.8	+4.0
Majority		259	14.4	−8.0
Turnout		1,803		
Labour gain from Conservative		Swing		

=== Urmston East ===
Urmston East
Party	Candidate	Votes	%	±%
Conservative	A. R. Coupe	995	55.7	+7.6
Labour	A. Payne	790	44.3	−7.6
Majority		205	11.4	
Turnout		1,785		
Conservative hold		Swing		

=== Urmston West ===
Urmston West
Party	Candidate	Votes	%	±%
Conservative	J. F. Egan*	919	57.5	+1.0
Labour	R. E. Taylor	679	42.5	−1.0
Majority		240	15.0	+2.0
Turnout		1,598		
Conservative hold		Swing		
