= 1971 Urmston Urban District Council election =

1971 English local government election

← 1970	15 May 1971	1972 →

7 of 21 seats to Urmston Urban District 11 seats needed for a majority
	First party	Second party	Third party
Party	Conservative	Labour	Liberal
Last election	7 seats, 62.9%	0 seats, 37.1%	did not stand
Seats before	20	0	0
Seats won	3	3	1
Seats after	17	3	1
Seat change	▼3	▲3	▲1
Popular vote	5,763	6,472	825
Percentage	42.0%	47.2%	6.0%
Swing	▼20.9%	▲10.1%	N/A
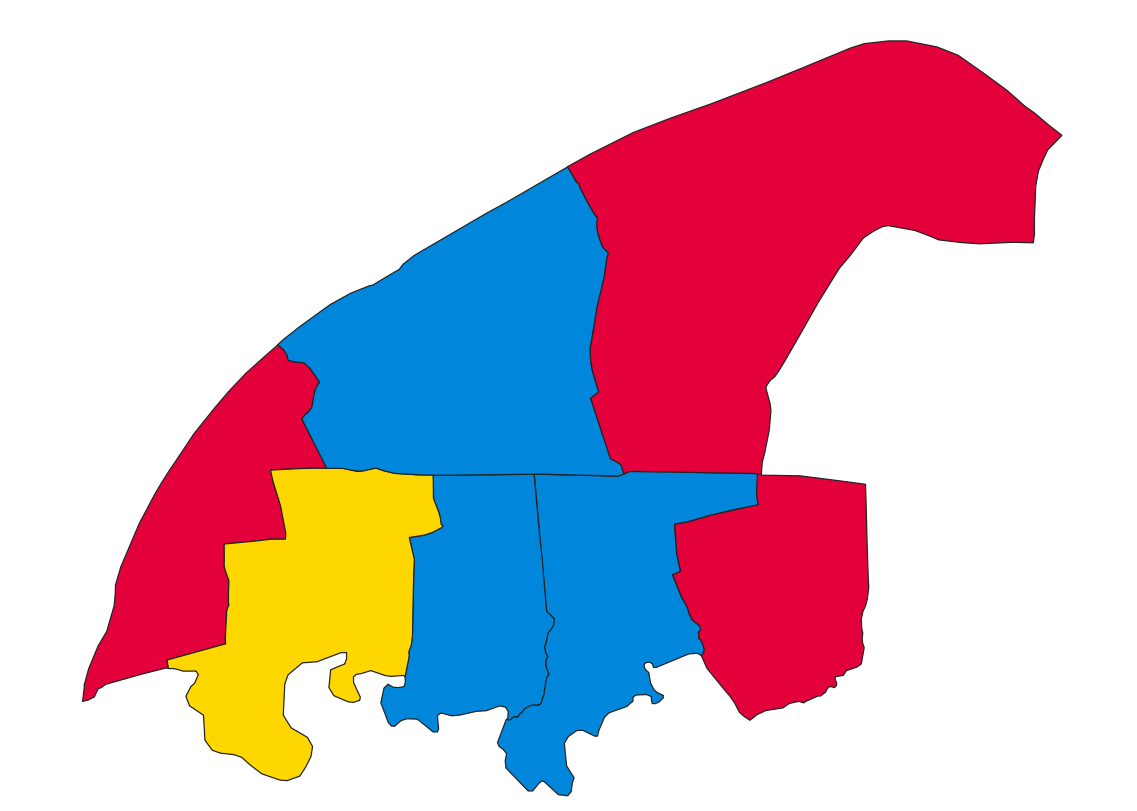
- Map of results of 1971 election
Leader of the Council before election
Conservative
Leader of the Council after election
Conservative

Elections to Urmston Council were held on Saturday, 15 May 1971. One third of the councillors were up for election, with each successful candidate to serve a three-year term of office. The Conservative Party retained overall control of the council.

== Election result ==
Party	Votes		Seats			Full Council	
Conservative Party	5,763 (42.0%)	▼20.9	3 (42.9%)	3 / 7	▼3	17 (81.0%)	17 / 21
Labour Party	6,472 (47.2%)	▲10.1	3 (42.9%)	3 / 7	▲3	3 (14.3%)	3 / 21
Liberal Party	825 (6.0%)	N/A	1 (14.3%)	1 / 7	▲1	1 (4.8%)	1 / 21
Residents	656 (4.8%)	▲4.8	0 (0.0%)	0 / 7	▼1	0 (0.0%)	0 / 21

↓
3	1	17

== Ward results ==
=== Davyhulme East ===
Davyhulme East
Party	Candidate	Votes	%	±%
Labour	W. J. Williams	1,199	53.1	+20.2
Conservative	P. W. Lucas*	1,058	46.9	−20.2
Majority		141	6.2	
Turnout		2,257		
Labour gain from Conservative		Swing		

=== Davyhulme West ===
Davyhulme West
Party	Candidate	Votes	%	±%
Conservative	D. P. Harding*	1,135	50.6	−15.9
Labour	L. M Seex	1,108	49.4	+15.9
Majority		27	1.2	−31.8
Turnout		2,243		
Conservative hold		Swing		

=== Flixton Central ===
Flixton Central
Party	Candidate	Votes	%	±%
Liberal	A. Pitt	825	40.5	N/A
Residents	S. Bailey*	656	32.2	N/A
Labour	R. E. Taylor	555	27.3	−9.9
Majority		169	8.3	
Turnout		2,036		
Liberal gain from Residents		Swing		

=== Flixton East ===
Flixton East
Party	Candidate	Votes	%	±%
Conservative	G. Bryan*	993	59.0	−11.6
Labour	C. Barnes	691	41.0	+11.6
Majority		302	18.0	−23.2
Turnout		1,684		
Conservative hold		Swing		

=== Flixton West ===
Flixton West
Party	Candidate	Votes	%	±%
Labour	B. Elliott	1,295	61.2	+13.9
Conservative	T. Evans	820	38.8	−13.9
Majority		475	22.4	
Turnout		2,115		
Labour gain from Conservative		Swing		

=== Urmston East ===
Urmston East
Party	Candidate	Votes	%	±%
Labour	D. O'Kelly	946	51.9	+5.3
Conservative	A. R. Coupe*	877	48.1	−5.3
Majority		69	3.8	
Turnout		1,823		
Labour gain from Conservative		Swing		

=== Urmston West ===
Urmston West
Party	Candidate	Votes	%	±%
Conservative	R. V. Royle-Higginson*	880	56.5	−15.8
Labour	J. M. Fisher	678	43.5	+15.8
Majority		202	13.0	−31.6
Turnout		1,558		
Conservative hold		Swing		
