= Civil parishes in Greater Manchester =

English administrative areas

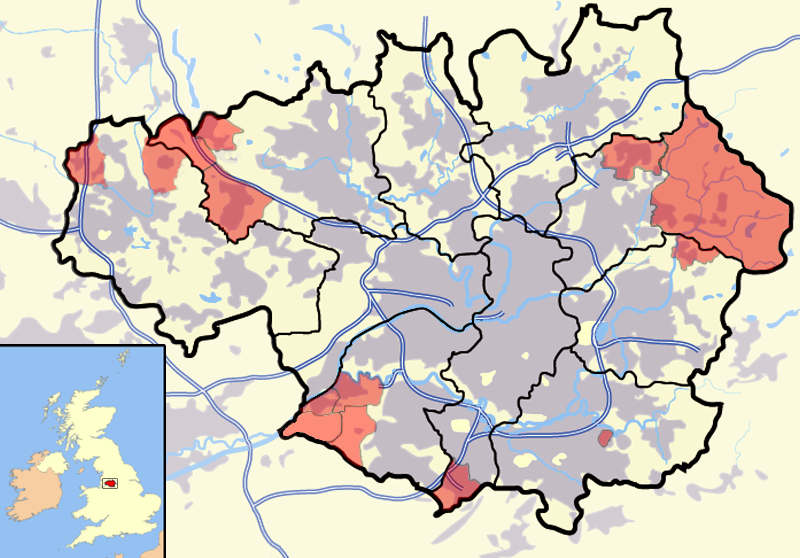
A map of Greater Manchester, with its 14 parished areas highlighted in red.

A civil parish is a country subdivision, forming the lowest unit of local government in England. There are 14 civil parishes in the ceremonial county of Greater Manchester, most of the county being unparished; Bury, Rochdale, Salford and Stockport are completely unparished. At the 2001 census, there were 129,325 people living in the civil parishes, accounting for 5.2% of the county's population.

== History ==
Parishes arose from Church of England divisions, and were originally purely ecclesiastical divisions. Over time they acquired civil administration powers.

The Highways Act 1555 made parishes responsible for the upkeep of roads. Every adult inhabitant of the parish was obliged to work four days a year on the roads, providing their own tools, carts and horses; the work was overseen by an unpaid local appointee, the Surveyor of Highways.

The poor were looked after by the monasteries, until their dissolution. In 1572, magistrates were given power to 'survey the poor' and impose taxes for their relief. This system was made more formal by the Poor Law Act 1601, which made parishes responsible for administering the Poor Law; overseers were appointed to charge a rate to support the poor of the parish. The 19th century saw an increase in the responsibility of parishes, although the Poor Law powers were transferred to Poor Law Unions. The Public Health Act 1872 grouped parishes into rural sanitary districts, based on the poor law unions; these subsequently formed the basis for rural districts.

Parishes were run by vestries, meeting annually to appoint officials, and were generally identical to ecclesiastical parishes, although some townships in large parishes administered the Poor Law themselves; under the Divided Parishes and Poor Law Amendment Act 1882, all extra-parochial areas and townships that levied a separate rate became independent civil parishes.

Civil parishes in their modern sense date from the Local Government Act 1894 (56 & 57 Vict. c. 73), which abolished vestries; established elected parish councils in all rural parishes with more than 300 electors; grouped rural parishes into rural districts; and aligned parish boundaries with county and borough boundaries. Urban civil parishes continued to exist, and were generally coterminous with the urban district, municipal borough or county borough in which they were situated; many large towns contained a number of parishes, and these were usually merged into one. Parish councils were not formed in urban areas, and the only function of the parish was to elect guardians to poor law unions; with the abolition of the Poor Law system in 1930 the parishes had only a nominal existence.

The Local Government Act 1972 retained civil parishes in rural areas, and many former urban districts and municipal boroughs that were being abolished, were replaced by new successor parishes; urban areas that were considered too large to be single parishes became unparished areas.

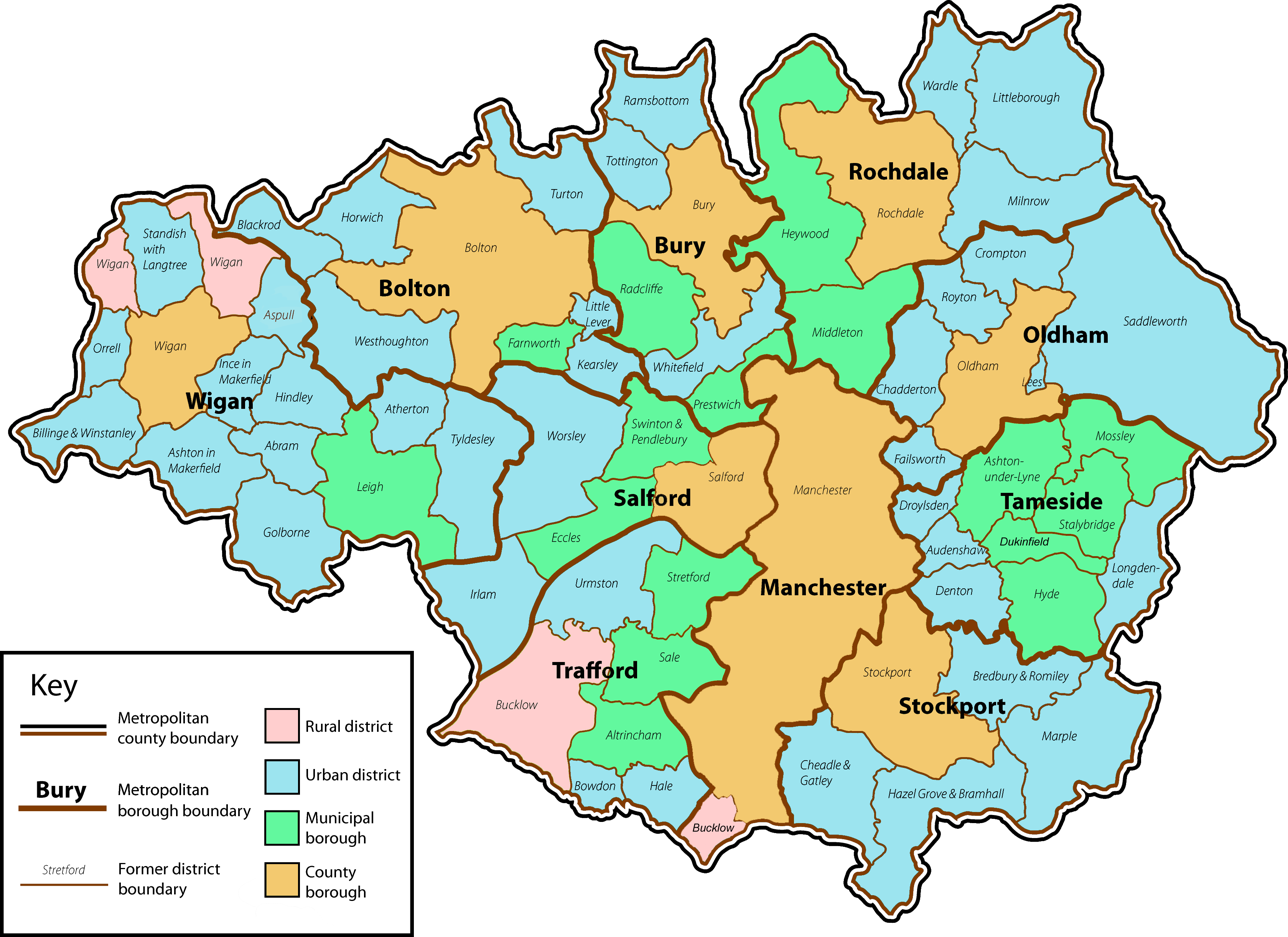
Greater Manchester showing the former local authorities

== The current position ==
Recent governments have encouraged the formation of town and parish councils in unparished areas, and the Local Government and Rating Act 1997 gave local residents the right to demand the creation of a new civil parish.

A parish council can become a town council unilaterally, simply by resolution; and a civil parish can also gain city status, but only if that is granted by the Crown. The chairman of a town or city council is called a mayor. The Local Government and Public Involvement in Health Act 2007 introduced alternative names: a parish council can now choose to be called a community; village; or neighbourhood council.

Civil parishes with town status

== List of civil parishes and unparished areas ==
Image	Name	Status	Population	District	Former local authority	Refs
	Blackrod	Town	5,300	Bolton	Blackrod; Urban District	
	Bolton	Unparished area	142,249	Bolton	Bolton; County Borough	
	Farnworth	Unparished area	24,062	Bolton	Farnworth; Municipal Borough	
	Horwich	Town	19,312	Bolton	Horwich; Urban District	
	Kearsley	Unparished area	11,747	Bolton	Kearsley; Urban District	
	Little Lever	Unparished area	10,712	Bolton	Little Lever; Urban District	
	South Turton	Unparished area	24,599	Bolton	Turton; Urban District	
	Westhoughton	Town	23,056	Bolton	Westhoughton; Urban District	
	Bury	Unparished area	64,534	Bury	Bury; County Borough	
	Prestwich	Unparished area	33,446	Bury	Prestwich; Municipal Borough	
	Radcliffe	Unparished area	33,994	Bury	Radcliffe; Municipal Borough	
	Ramsbottom	Unparished area	14,635	Bury	Ramsbottom; Urban District	
	Tottington	Unparished area	12,511	Bury	Tottington; Urban District	
	Whitefield	Unparished area	21,488	Bury	Whitefield; Urban District	
	Manchester	Unparished area	392,713	Manchester	Manchester; County Borough	
	Ringway	Civil parish	106	Manchester	Bucklow; Rural District	
	Chadderton	Unparished area	31,114	Oldham	Chadderton; Urban District	
	Failsworth	Unparished area	20,555	Oldham	Failsworth; Urban District	
	Lees	Unparished area	4,616	Oldham	Lees; Urban District	
	Oldham	Unparished area	93,955	Oldham	Oldham; County Borough	
	Royton	Unparished area	20,961	Oldham	Royton; Urban District	
	Saddleworth	Civil parish	24,351	Oldham	Saddleworth; Urban District	
	Shaw and Crompton	Civil parish	21,721	Oldham	Crompton; Urban District	
	Heywood	Unparished area	29,240	Rochdale	Heywood; Municipal Borough	
	Littleborough	Unparished area	13,315	Rochdale	Littleborough; Urban District	
	Middleton	Unparished area	45,688	Rochdale	Middleton; Municipal Borough	
	Milnrow	Unparished area	11,561	Rochdale	Milnrow; Urban District	
	Rochdale	Unparished area	97,433	Rochdale	Rochdale; County Borough	
	Wardle	Unparished area	8,120	Rochdale	Wardle; Urban District	
	Eccles	Unparished area	34,599	Salford	Eccles; Municipal Borough	
	Irlam	Unparished area	19,125	Salford	Irlam; Urban District	
	Salford	Unparished area	72,721	Salford	Salford; County Borough	
	Swinton and Pendlebury	Unparished area	36,928	Salford	Swinton and Pendlebury; Municipal Borough	
	Worsley	Unparished area	52,730	Salford	Worsley; Urban District	
	Bredbury and Romiley	Unparished area	28,829	Stockport	Bredbury and Romiley; Urban District	
	Cheadle and Gatley	Unparished area	57,224	Stockport	Cheadle and Gatley; Urban District	
	Hazel Grove and Bramhall	Unparished area	41,202	Stockport	Hazel Grove and Bramhall; Urban District	
	Marple	Unparished area	23,480	Stockport	Marple; Urban District	
	Stockport	Unparished area	133,793	Stockport	Stockport; County Borough	
	Ashton under Lyne	Unparished area	43,526	Tameside	Ashton under Lyne; Municipal Borough	
	Audenshaw	Unparished area	12,790	Tameside	Audenshaw; Urban District	
	Denton	Unparished area	34,280	Tameside	Denton; Urban District	
	Droylsden	Unparished area	23,172	Tameside	Droylsden; Urban District	
	Dukinfield	Unparished area	19,278	Tameside	Dukinfield; Municipal Borough	
	Hyde	Unparished area	34,602	Tameside	Hyde; Municipal Borough	
	Longdendale	Unparished area	9,733	Tameside	Longdendale; Urban District	
	Mossley	Town	9,856	Tameside	Mossley; Municipal Borough	
	Stalybridge	Unparished area	25,806	Tameside	Stalybridge; Municipal Borough	
	Altrincham	Unparished area	40,376	Trafford	Altrincham; Municipal Borough	
	Bowdon	Unparished area	6,079	Trafford	Bowdon; Urban District	
	Carrington	Civil parish	396	Trafford	Bucklow; Rural District	
	Dunham Massey	Civil parish	475	Trafford	Bucklow; Rural District	
	Hale	Unparished area	15,316	Trafford	Hale; Urban District	
	Partington	Civil parish	7,327	Trafford	Bucklow; Rural District	
	Sale	Unparished area	56,823	Trafford	Sale; Municipal Borough	
	Stretford	Unparished area	42,103	Trafford	Stretford; Municipal Borough	
	Urmston	Unparished area	40,964	Trafford	Urmston; Urban District	
	Warburton	Civil parish	286	Trafford	Bucklow; Rural District	
	Abram	Unparished area	13,706	Wigan	Abram; Urban District	
	Ashton in Makerfield	Unparished area	23,431	Wigan	Ashton in Makerfield; Urban District	
	Aspull	Unparished area	5,522	Wigan	Aspull; Urban District	
	Atherton	Unparished area	18,876	Wigan	Atherton; Urban District	
	Billinge Higher End and Winstanley	Unparished area	6,731	Wigan	Billinge and Winstanley; Urban District	
	Golborne	Unparished area	23,214	Wigan	Golborne; Urban District	
	Haigh	Civil parish	594	Wigan	Wigan; Rural District	
	Hindley	Unparished area	22,769	Wigan	Hindley; Urban District	
	Ince in Makerfield	Unparished area	10,184	Wigan	Ince in Makerfield; Urban District	
	Leigh	Unparished area	44,436	Wigan	Leigh; Municipal Borough	
	Orrell	Unparished area	11,988	Wigan	Orrell; Urban District	
	Shevington	Civil parish	9,786	Wigan	Wigan; Rural District	
	Standish with Langtree	Unparished area	13,309	Wigan	Standish with Langtree; Urban District	
	Tyldesley	Unparished area	24,371	Wigan	Tyldesley; Urban District	
	Wigan	Unparished area	72,363	Wigan	Wigan; County Borough	
	Worthington	Civil parish	135	Wigan	Wigan; Rural District	

== See also ==
- List of civil parishes in England
