= Urmston Urban District =

Former local government area in the UK

Coordinates: 53°27′N 2°21′W

- History
  - Created: 1894
  - Abolished: 1974
  - Succeeded by: Metropolitan Borough of Trafford
- Status: Urban district

Urmston Urban District was, from 1894 to 1974, a local government district in the administrative county of Lancashire, England, which covered the modern-day district of Urmston.

The Urban District was created by the Local Government Act 1894. In 1974 Urmston Urban District was abolished by the Local Government Act 1972 and its former area transferred to the new county of Greater Manchester to form part of the Metropolitan Borough of Trafford.

== Local elections ==
- 1970 Urmston Urban District Council election
- 1971 Urmston Urban District Council election
- 1972 Urmston Urban District Council election
