= List of demographics articles =

This is a list of demographics articles. "Demographics articles" refers to the figures related to the population of a specific country, including population density, ethnicity, education level, health of the populace, economic status, religious affiliations and other aspects regarding the population.

The primary topic is demography.

== Index ==
=== A ===
- Abkhazia
- Afghanistan
- Aguascalientes
- Ahmedabad
- Alabama
- Alaska
- Albania
- Alberta
- Algeria
- Allentown, Pennsylvania
- American Samoa
- Andhra Pradesh
- Andorra
- Angola
- Antigua and Barbuda
- Argentina
- Arizona
- Arkansas
- (Republic of Artsakh) Artsakh
- Aruba
- Armenia
- Atlanta
- Auckland
- Aurangabad
- Australia
- Austria
- Azerbaijan

=== B ===
- Bačka
- (The Bahamas) Bahamas
- Bahrain
- Bangladesh
- Banja Luka
- Barbados
- Beijing
- Belarus
- Belgium
- Belgrade
- Belize
- Benin
- Berlin
- Bermuda
- Bhutan
- Białystok
- Bihar
- Birmingham
- Bolivia
- (Bosnia and Herzegovina) Bosnia & Herzegovina
- Botswana
- Bradford
- Bratislava
- Brazil
- Brisbane
- Bristol
- British Columbia
- Brunei
- Budapest
- Bulgaria
- Burkina Faso
- Burundi

=== C ===
- Calgary
- California
- Cambodia
- Cameroon
- Canada
- Canberra
- Cape Verde
- Cayman Islands
- Central African Republic
- Chad
- Chennai
- Chicago
- Chile
- China
- Cincinnati
- Cleveland
- (Cocos (Keeling) Islands) Cocos Islands
- Cologne
- Colombia
- Colorado
- Comoros
- Democratic Republic of the Congo
- Republic of the Congo
- Connecticut
- Cornwall
- Costa Rica
- Coventry
- (Autonomous Republic of Crimea) Crimea
- Croatia
- Cuba
- Cumbria
- Cyprus
- Czech Republic

=== D ===
- Dallas
- Darjeeling
- Delaware
- Denmark
- Denver
- Detroit
- Djibouti
- Dominica
- Dominican Republic
- (Emirate of Dubai) Dubai

=== E ===
- Eastern Norway
- (Timor-Leste) East Timor
- Ecuador
- Edmonton
- Egypt
- El Salvador
- Equatorial Guinea
- England
- Eritrea
- Estonia
- Ethiopia
- (Europe) European Union

=== F ===
- Faroe Islands
- Ferizaj
- Fiji
- Finland
- Florida
- France
- French Polynesia

=== G ===
- Gabon
- (The Gambia) Gambia
- (Georgia (country)) Georgia (country)
- (Georgia (U.S. state)) Georgia (U.S. state)
- Germany
- Ghana
- Gibraltar
- Glasgow
- Greater Manchester
- Greece
- Greenland
- Grenada
- Guam
- Guatemala
- Guernsey
- Guinea
- Guinea-Bissau
- Guyana

=== H ===
- Haiti
- Hamburg
- Hawaii
- Honduras
- Hong Kong
- Houston
- Hungary
- Hyderabad

=== I ===
- Iceland
- Idaho
- Illinois
- India
- Indiana
- Indonesia
- Iowa
- Iran
- Iraq
- (Republic of Ireland) Ireland
- (Islamabad Capital Territory) Islamabad
- Isle of Man
- Israel
- Italy
- Ivory Coast

=== J ===
- Jamaica
- Japan
- (Empire of Japan) Japanese Empire
- Jersey
- Jerusalem
- Jordan

=== K ===
- Kansas
- Karachi
- Karnataka
- Kazakhstan
- Kentucky
- Kenya
- Kerala
- Kiribati
- North Korea
- South Korea
- Kosovo
- Kuwait
- Kyrgyzstan

=== L ===
- Lahore
- Laos
- Latvia
- Lebanon
- Leeds
- Leicester
- Lesotho
- Liberia
- Libya
- Liechtenstein
- Lima
- Lithuania
- Liverpool
- London
- Louisiana
- Luton
- Luxembourg

=== M ===
- Macau
- Madagascar
- Maine
- Malawi
- Malaysia
- Maldives
- Mali
- Malta
- Manitoba
- Marshall Islands
- Maryland
- Massachusetts
- Mauritania
- Mauritius
- Mayotte
- Meerut District
- Melbourne
- Mexico
- Michigan
- (Federated States of Micronesia) Micronesia
- Minneapolis
- Minnesota
- Mississippi
- Missouri
- Moldova
- Monaco
- Mongolia
- Montana
- Montenegro
- Montreal
- Montserrat
- Morocco
- Mozambique
- Munich
- Myanmar

=== N ===
- Namibia
- Nauru
- Nebraska
- Nepal
- Netherlands
- Netherlands Antilles
- Nevada
- New Brunswick
- New Caledonia
- Newfoundland and Labrador
- New Hampshire
- New Jersey
- New Mexico
- (New York (state)) New York
- New York City
- New Zealand
- Nicaragua
- Niger
- Nigeria
- Niue
- (Norfolk Island) Norfolk Islands
- North Carolina
- North Dakota
- North Macedonia
- Northern Cyprus
- Northern Mariana Islands
- Northern Norway
- Northwest Territories
- Norway
- Nottingham
- Nova Scotia
- Novi Sad
- Nunavut

=== O ===
- Oaxaca
- Ohio
- Oklahoma
- Omak, Washington
- Oman
- Ontario
- Oregon
- Oslo
- Ottawa

=== P ===
- Pakistan
- Palau
- Palestine
- Panama
- Papua New Guinea
- Paraguay
- Paris
- Peć
- Pennsylvania
- Peru
- Pitcairn Islands
- Philadelphia
- Philippines
- Podgorica
- Podlaskie Voivodeship
- Poland
- Portugal
- Prince Edward Island
- Puerto Rico
- (Punjab, Pakistan) Punjab, India

=== Q ===
- Qatar
- Quebec

=== R ===
- Rawalpindi District
- Réunion
- Rhode Island
- (Rio de Janeiro (state)) Rio de Janeiro
- Romania
- Rotselaar
- Russia
- Rwanda

=== S ===
- Sahrawi Arab Democratic Republic
- Saint Barthélemy
- Saint Helena
- Saint Kitts and Nevis
- Saint Lucia
- Saint Paul, Minnesota
- Saint Petersburg
- Saint Pierre and Miquelon
- Saint Vincent and the Grenadines
- Samoa
- San Francisco
- San Marino
- Santa Maria, Bulacan
- São Tomé and Príncipe
- Sarajevo
- Saskatchewan
- Saudi Arabia
- Scotland
- Seattle
- Senegal
- Serbia
- Serbian Banat
- Seychelles
- Shanghai
- Sheffield
- Siberia
- Sierra Leone
- Sindh
- Singapore
- Slough
- Slovakia
- Slovenia
- Solomon Islands
- Somalia
- Somaliland
- South Africa
- South Carolina
- South Dakota
- Southern Cone, South America
- Southern Norway
- South Sudan
- Soviet Union
- Spain
- Sri Lanka
- Subotica
- Sudan
- Suriname
- Svalbard
- (Eswatini) Swaziland
- Sweden
- Switzerland
- Sydney
- Syria
- Syrmia

=== T ===
- Tajikistan
- Tamil Nadu
- Tanzania
- Tehran
- Telangana
- Tennessee
- Texas
- Thailand
- Tibet
- Tiruchirappalli
- Togo
- Tokelau
- Tonga
- Toronto
- Transnistria
- Trinidad and Tobago
- Trøndelag
- Tulsa, Oklahoma
- Tunisia
- Turkey
- Turkmenistan
- Turks and Caicos Islands
- Tuvalu

=== U ===
- Uganda
- Ukraine
- United Arab Emirates
- United Kingdom
- United States of America
- Uruguay
- Utah
- Utica, New York
- Uttar Pradesh
- Uzbekistan

=== V ===
- Vancouver
- Vanuatu
- Vatican City
- Venezuela
- Vermont
- Vietnam
- (Victoria (state)) Victoria, Australia
- Virginia
- Visalia, California
- Visoko
- British Virgin Islands
- United States Virgin Islands

=== W ===
- Wales
- Wallis and Futuna Islands
- (Washington (state)) Washington
- (Washington, D.C.) Washington D.C.
- Western Norway
- West Virginia
- Winnipeg
- Wisconsin
- Wyoming

=== Y ===
- Yemen
- Yukon

=== Z ===
- Zagreb
- Zambia
- Zimbabwe
