= Demographics of Banja Luka =

== Current population ==
From 2013 census, The City of Banja Luka has a population of 185,042 people.

=== Ethnic composition ===
Ethnicity	Number	Percentage
Serbs	165,750	89.57%
Bosniaks	7,581	4.10%
Croats	5,104	2.76%
Others	6,607	3.57%
Total	185,042	100%

=== Religious composition ===
Ethnicity	Number	Percentage
Serbian Orthodox Church	168,955	90.25%
Islam	7,526	4.07%
Roman Catholic Church	4,842	2.62%
Agnostic	612	0.33%
Atheist	885	0.45%
Others	4,422	2.39%
Total	185,042	100%

== 1991 ==
According to the 1991 census, the municipality of Banja Luka had a population of 195,692, including:

- 106,826 (54.58%) Serbs
- 29,026 (14.83%) Croats
- 28,558 (14.59%) ethnic Muslims
- 23,656 (12.08%) ethnic Yugoslavs
- 7,626 (3.92%) others and unknown

== 1981 ==
According to the 1981. census, the municipality of Banja Luka had a population of 183,618, including:

- 93,389 (50,86%) Serbs
- 30,442 (16,57%) Croats
- 21,726 (11,83%) ethnic Muslims
- 31,347 (17,07%) ethnic Yugoslavs
- 6,714 (3,65%) others and unknown

== 1971 ==
According to the 1971. census, the municipality of Banja Luka had a population of 158,736, including:

- 92,465 (58,25%) Serbs
- 33,371 (21,02%) Croats
- 24,268 (15,28%) ethnic Muslims
- 4,684 (2,95%) ethnic Yugoslavs
- 3,948 (2,48%) others and unknown

== Settlements (over 1,500 residents), 1991. census ==
- Banja Luka

total: 143,079

- 70,155 (49.03%) Serbs
- 27,689 (19.35%) ethnic Muslims
- 15,700 (10.97%) Croats
- 22,645 (15.82%) ethnic Yugoslavs
- 6,890 (4.81%) others and unknown
- Ivanjska

total: 4,577

- 3,306 (72.23%) Croats
- 1,095 (23.92%) Serbs
- 6 (0.13%) ethnic Muslims
- 118 (2.57%) ethnic Yugoslavs
- 52 (1.13%) others and unknown
- Piskavica

total: 3,798

- 3,729 (98.18%) Serbs
- 15 (0.39%) Croats
- 1 (0.02%) ethnic Muslims
- 27 (0.71%) ethnic Yugoslavs
- 26 (0.68%) others and unknown
- Rekavice

total: 2,679

- 2,487 (92.83%) Serbs
- 128 (4.77%) Croats
- 1 (0.03%) ethnic Muslims
- 49 (1.82%) ethnic Yugoslavs
- 14 (0.52%) others and unknown
- Dragočaj

total: 2,578

- 1,890 (73.31%) Croats
- 478 (18.54%) Serbs
- 21 (0.81%) ethnic Muslims
- 141 (5.46%) ethnic Yugoslavs
- 48 (1.86%) others and unknown
- Kola

total: 2,241

- 2,212 (98.70%) Serbs
- 1 (0.04%) ethnic Muslims
- 18 (0.80%) ethnic Yugoslavs
- 10 (0.44%) others and unknown
- Motike

total: 2,009

- 944 (46.98%) Croats
- 941 (46.83%) Serbs
- 10 (0.49%) ethnic Muslims
- 80 (3.98%) ethnic Yugoslavs
- 34 (1.69%) others and unknown
- Krupa na Vrbasu

total: 1,858

- 1,826 - 98.27% Serbs
- 7 - 0.37% Croats
- 1 - 0.05% ethnic Muslims
- 14 - 0.75% ethnic Yugoslavs
- 10 - 0.53% others and unknown
- Bistrica

total: 1,703

- 1,651 - 96.94% Serbs
- 6 - 0.35% ethnic Muslims
- 3 - 0.17% Croats
- 32 - 1.87% ethnic Yugoslavs
- 11 - 0.64% others and unknown
- Bočac

total: 1,685

- 1,670 - 99.10% Serbs
- 1 - 0.05% Croats
- 1 - 0.05% ethnic Muslims
- 3 - 0.17% ethnic Yugoslavs
- 10 - 0.59% others and unknown
- Pavlovac

total: 1,522

- 1,377 - 90.47% Serbs
- 26 - 1.70% Croats
- 7 - 0.45% ethnic Muslims
- 39 - 2.56% ethnic Yugoslavs
- 73 - 4.79% others and unknown
- Šimići

total: 1,516

- 1,493 - 98.48% Croats
- 8 - 0.52% Serbs
- 15 - 0.98% others and unknown

== Historical population ==
Ethnic composition of Banja Luka municipality in 1981. Serbs Croats No clear majority (Serbs, Croats, Muslims, Yugoslavs) Uninhabited or no data

At the first census, conducted by Austro-Hungarian authorities in 1879, Banja Luka had the following religious (ethnic) composition:

Banja Luka municipality - 86,209 citizens, Orthodox 74.46%, Muslims 14.33%, Catholics 10.52%

Banja Luka city - 13,566 citizens, Muslims 67.71%, 19.8% Orthodox.

As the city was industrialized and wider urbanization of the surrounding areas took place, Orthodox Serbs that typically inhabited surrounding rural areas (due to Ottoman feudal system) were incorporated into the city's urban structure.

Banja Luka is the seat of the Roman Catholic Diocese of Banja Luka and home to the Cathedral of St. Bonaventure.

During World War II most of Banja Luka's prominent Serbian and Sephardic Jewish families were deported to nearby Croatian concentration camps, such as Jasenovac and Stara Gradiška in Croatia. Today, Banja Luka's Jewish community is virtually non-existent. A spike in Serbian immigration was mostly noted after the earthquake of 1969, when the city has seen a boom in housing construction.

In 1991 the city of Banja Luka was still an ethnically mixed city (with a relative Serb majority), while on the municipal level there was an evident Serb majority of 54.6%.

== Sources ==
- Official results from the book: Ethnic composition of Bosnia-Herzegovina population, by municipalities and settlements, 1991. census, Zavod za statistiku Bosne i Hercegovine - Bilten no.234, Sarajevo 1991.
