= Pavlovac, Banja Luka =

Pavlovac Павловац (Serbian)
- Neighbourhood
- Location within Bosnia and Herzegovina
- Coordinates: 44°47′46″N 17°08′34″E
- Country: Bosnia and Herzegovina
- Entity: Republika Srpska
- Municipality: Banja Luka

Population (2013)
  - Total: 1,934
- Time zone: UTC+1 (CET)
  - Summer (DST): UTC+2 (CEST)

Pavlovac (Serbian Cyrillic: Павловац) is a neighbourhood in the municipality of Banja Luka, Republika Srpska, Bosnia and Herzegovina.
