= Demographics of Cincinnati =

Cincinnati is a city in Ohio, United States.

== Racial and ethnic composition ==
Cincinnati city, Ohio – Racial and ethnic composition Note: the US Census treats Hispanic/Latino as an ethnic category. This table excludes Latinos from the racial categories and assigns them to a separate category. Hispanics/Latinos may be of any race.
Race / Ethnicity (NH = Non-Hispanic)	Pop 1980	Pop 1990	Pop 2000	Pop 2010	Pop 2020	% 1980	% 1990	% 2000	% 2010	% 2020
White alone (NH)	249,772	218,986	173,781	142,831	145,100	64.80%	60.15%	52.46%	48.10%	46.91%
Black or African American alone (NH)	129,267	137,702	141,534	132,307	124,654	33.54%	37.83%	42.72%	44.56%	40.30%
Native American or Alaska Native alone (NH)	560	619	641	549	475	0.15%	0.17%	0.19%	0.18%	0.15%
Asian alone (NH)	2,255	3,908	5,099	5,434	7,767	0.59%	1.07%	1.54%	1.83%	2.51%
Native Hawaiian or Pacific Islander alone (NH)	x	x	110	168	139	x	x	0.03%	0.06%	0.04%
Other race alone (NH)	340	439	838	721	1,691	0.09%	0.12%	0.25%	0.24%	0.55%
Mixed race or Multiracial (NH)	x	x	5,052	6,625	13,655	x	x	1.52%	2.23%	4.41%
Hispanic or Latino (any race)	3,263	2,386	4,230	8,308	15,836	0.85%	0.66%	1.28%	2.80%	5.12%
Total	385,457	364,040	331,285	296,943	309,317	100.00%	100.00%	100.00%	100.00%	100.00%

== 2010 census ==
As of the census of 2010, there were 296,943 people, 133,420 households, and 62,319 families residing in the city. The population density was 3,809.9 inhabitants per square mile (1,471.0/km^{2}). There were 161,095 housing units at an average density of 2,066.9 per square mile (798.0/km^{2}). The racial makeup of the city was 49.3% White, 45.0% African American, 0.3% Native American, 1.8% Asian, 0.1% Pacific Islander, 1.2% from other races, and 2.5% from two or more races. Hispanic or Latino of any race were 2.8% of the population.

There were 133,420 households, of which 25.4% had children under the age of 18 living with them, 23.2% were married couples living together, 19.1% had a female householder with no husband present, 4.4% had a male householder with no wife present, and 53.3% were non-families. 43.4% of all households were made up of individuals, and 9.9% had someone living alone who was 65 years of age or older. The average household size was 2.12 and the average family size was 3.00.

The median age in the city was 32.5 years. 22.1% of residents were under the age of 18; 14.6% were between the ages of 18 and 24; 28.4% were from 25 to 44; 24.1% were from 45 to 64; and 10.8% were 65 years of age or older. The gender makeup of the city was 48.0% male and 52.0% female.

== 2000 census ==
As of the census of 2000, there were 331,285 people, 148,095 households, and 72,566 families residing in the city. The population density was 4,249.0 people per square mile (1,640.5 people/km^{2}). There were 166,012 housing units at an average density of 2,129.2 per square mile (822.1/km^{2}). The racial makeup of the city was 52.97% White, 42.92% African American, 0.21% Native American, 1.55% Asian, 0.04% Pacific Islander, 0.63% from other races, and 1.68% from two or more races. Hispanic or Latinos of any race were 1.28% of the population. The top 4 largest ancestries include German (19.8%), Irish (10.4%), English (5.4%), Italian (3.5%).

There were 148,095 households, out of which 25.1% had children under the age of 18 living with them, 26.6% were married couples living together, 18.6% had a female householder with no husband present, and 51.0% were non-families. 42.8% of all households were made up of individuals, and 11.1% had someone living alone who was 65 years of age or older. The average household size was 2.15 and the average family size was 3.02.

In the city the population was spread out, with 24.5% under 18, 12.9% from 18 to 24, 31.6% from 25 to 44, 18.7% from 45 to 64, and 12.3% who were 65 or older. The median age was 32 years. For every 100 females, there were 89.4 males. For every 100 females age 18 and over, there were 85.6 males.

The median income for a household in the city was $29,493, and the median income for a family was $37,543. Males had a median income of $33,063 versus $26,946 for females. The per capita income for the city was $19,962. About 18.2% of families and 21.9% of the population were below the poverty line, including 32.0% of those under age 18 and 14.8% of those age 65 or over.
