= Demographics of Aguascalientes =

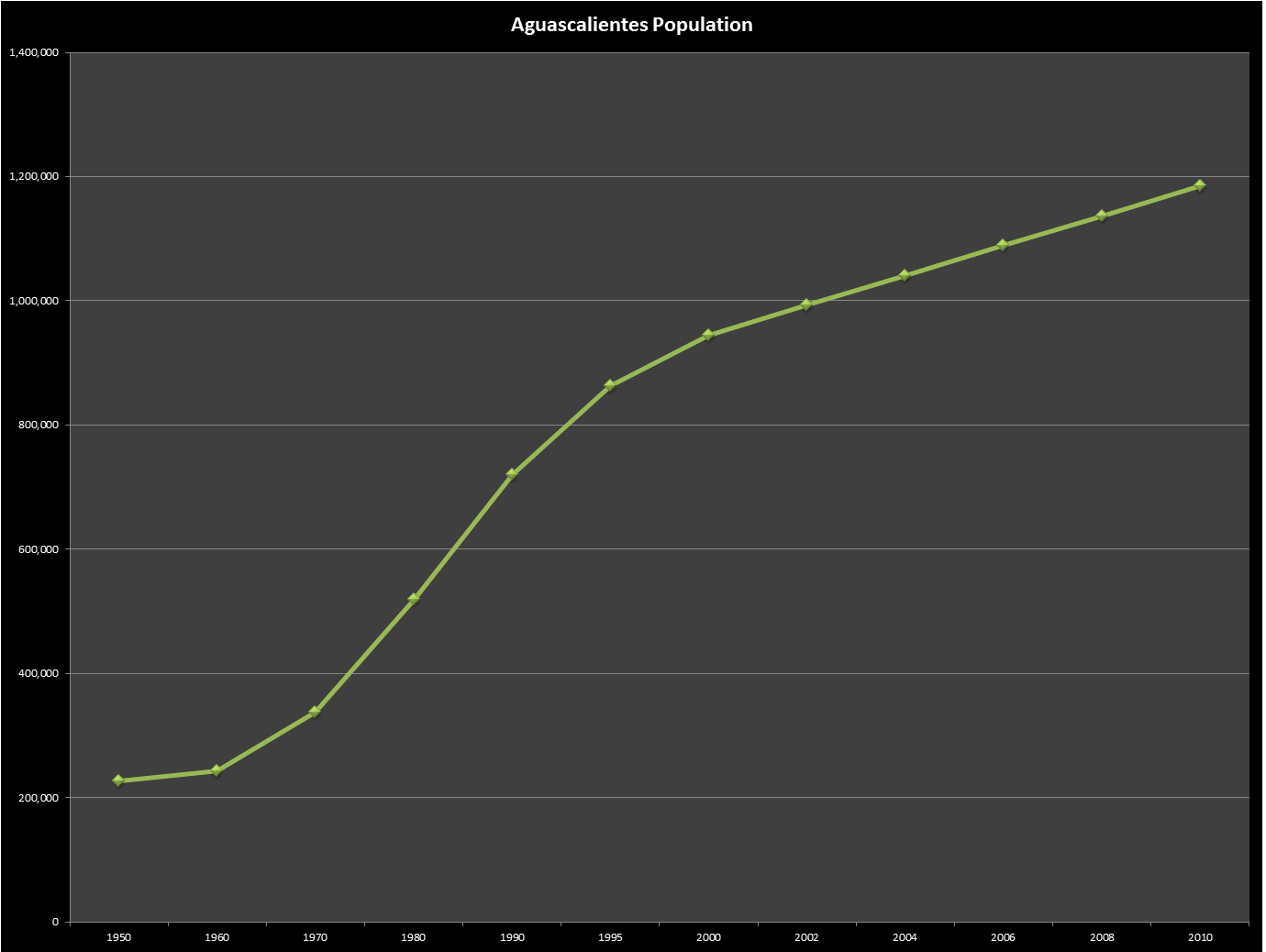
- Population of Aguascalientes from 1950-2010.
- Population: 1,184,996 (31 May 2010)
- Growth rate: 2.2% (2010-2005)
- Birth rate: 19.0 births/1,000 population (2011)
- Death rate: 4.3 deaths/1,000 population (2011)
- Life expectancy: 75.8 years (2011 est.)
  - male: 73.7 years (2011 est.)
  - female: 77.9 years (2011 est.)
- Fertility rate: 2.2 children born/woman (2008 est.)
- Infant mortality: 11.9 deaths/1,000 infants (2011)
- Net migration rate: 14 migrant(s)/1,000 population

Age structure
- 0–14 years: 31.6% (male 190,128/female 184,109)
- 15–64 years: 63.0% (male 357,049/female 389,331)
- 65 and over: 5.1% (male 27,477/female 32,870) (2010)

Sex ratio
- Total: 94.8/100 men/women (2010)

Nationality
- Nationality: noun: Mexican(s) adjective: Mexican
- Major ethnic: Mexicans (98.7%)
- Minor ethnic: Americans (0.7%)

Language
- Official: Spanish

The demographics of Aguascalientes are analyzed and collected by the National Institute of Statistics and Geography (INEG). As of 2020, the population of Aguascalientes is overwhelmingly ethnically Mexican and Roman Catholic and over 1.5 million people. The average life expectancy in 2011 was 75.8, which is slightly above the national average. The city's population is steadily increasing with a growth rate of 2.2%

== Age structure 2010 ==
Age Groups	Total	Male	Female
0–4 years	121,557	61,941	59,616
5–9 years	128,874	65,572	63,302
10–14 years	123,806	62,615	61,191
15–19 years	121,428	60,636	60,792
20–24 years	106,305	51,431	54,874
25–29 years	93,604	44,568	49,036
30–34 years	88,726	41,962	46,764
35–39 years	86,254	40,569	45,685
40–44 years	73,084	34,381	38,703
45–49 years	60,198	28,420	31,778
50–54 years	49,980	23,436	26,544
55–59 years	37,543	17,960	19,583
60–64 years	29,258	13,686	15,572
65–69 years	21,004	9,895	11,109
70–74 years	15,254	6,967	8,287
75–79 years	10,673	4,862	5,811
80–84 years	7,228	3,094	4,134
85–89 years	4,061	1,780	2,281
90–94 years	1,467	605	862
95–99 years	551	229	322
100 years and over	109	45	64
Unspecified	4,032		

== Historical Data ==
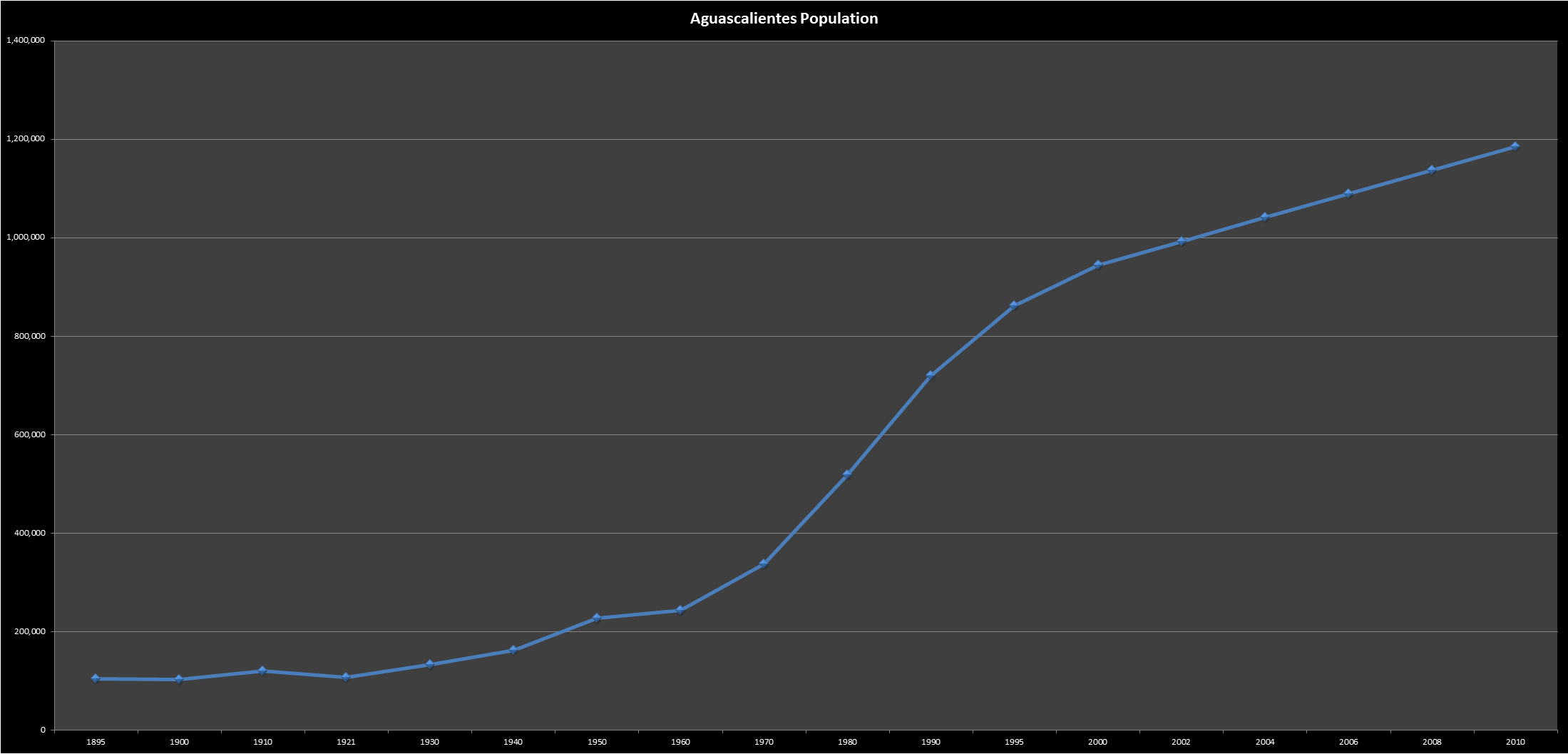
Aguascalientes population 1895-2010.

Historical population
Year	Pop.	±%
1895	104,693	—
1900	102,416	−2.2%
1910	120,511	+17.7%
1921	107,581	−10.7%
1930	132,900	+23.5%
1940	161,693	+21.7%
1950	226,965	+40.4%
1960	243,363	+7.2%
1970	338,142	+38.9%
1980	519,439	+53.6%
1990	719,659	+38.5%
1995	862,720	+19.9%
2000	944,285	+9.5%
2001	968,551	+2.6%
2002	992,751	+2.5%
2003	1,016,950	+2.4%
2004	1,041,150	+2.4%
2005	1,065,416	+2.3%
2006	1,089,319	+2.2%
2007	1,113,222	+2.2%
2008	1,137,125	+2.1%
2009	1,161,093	+2.1%
2010	1,184,996	+2.1%

== Vital statistics ==
Year	Population	Live births	Deaths	Natural change
1995	862,720	25,870	3,491	22,379
1996	879,024	25,115	3,498	21,617
1997	895,373	24,717	3,782	20,935
1998	911,677	25,537	3,783	21,754
1999	927,981	25,424	3,917	21,507
2000	944,285	24,941	3,728	21,213
2001	968,551	27,695	3,826	23,869
2002	992,751	27,524	4,301	23,223
2003	1,016,950	26,165	4,293	21,872
2004	1,041,150	26,527	4,488	22,039
2005	1,065,416	25,619	4,431	21,188
2006	1,089,319	20,946	4,488	20,946
2007	1,113,222	25,822	4,694	21,128
2008	1,137,125	26,509	4,955	21,554

== Religion ==
Religion in Aguascalientes (2010 census)
Roman Catholicism	93.0%
Other Christian	4.4%
Other Religion	0.0%
No religion	1.8%
Unspecified	0.8%

In 2010, the religious demographics of Aguascalientes were:

- Evangelical Protestant – 40,987
- Roman Catholic – 1,101,785
- Jewish – 113
- Different from Evangelical Bibles – 10,779
- Unclaimed – 21,235
- Others – 722
- Unspecified – 9,375

== See also ==
- Mexico
- States of Mexico
- Geography of Mexico
- List of Mexican states by area
- Ranked list of Mexican states
- List of Mexican states by HDI
