= Demographics of Podlaskie Voivodeship =

Podlaskie is the land of the confluence of cultures – Polish, Belarusian, Ukrainian and Lithuanian – and is indicative of the ethnic territories limits. Eastward of Podlaskie lie ethnically non-Polish lands, while westward ethnically non-West Ruthenian (Ukrainian and Belarusian) and non-Lithuanian lands too. Today, mainly Polish and Ruthenian (Ukrainian and Belarusian) is spoken in Podlaskie, while Lithuanian is preserved by the small but compact Lithuanian minority concentrated in the Sejny County.

== Statistics ==
At the end of 2009 in Podlaskie Voivodeship there were 1189.7 thousand inhabitants, 3.1 per cent of the total population of Poland. The average density of the population, the number of the population per 1 km2, was 59. The urban population in the same period was 60.2 per cent of the total number of inhabitants of the voivodeship, where the percentage of females in the total population amounted to 51.3 per cent. A statistical inhabitant of Podlaskie was 37.7 years old, whereas in 2008 – 37.5 years old. The latest population projection predict consistent decrease in the population in Podlaskie Voivodeship. In the next 26 years it will decrease by 117 thousand persons due to the aging of the population.

In 2009 in Podlaskie Voivodship there were 7557 marriages registered, 3.6 per cent fewer than in 2008. At the same time there were 2040 divorces decreed, 11.1 per cent more than 2008, and 117 separations, 19.9 per cent fewer than 2008. During 2009 there were 12202 live births noted, a 2.2 per cent increase over 2008. At the same time 12165 people died, a 4.5 per cent more than 2008. Natural increase in 2009 reached 37 persons (in the previous year –304).

In 2009 there were 10973 persons who moved to Podlaskie from other voivodeships and 400 from abroad. Conversely there were 12625 persons who moved from Podlaskie to other voivodeships of Poland and 469 out of Poland completely. The balance of migration was statistically similar to the one noted in 2008, a net decrease of 1721 persons (2008's figure was a net loss of 1698).

== History ==
Until the 19th century, Podlaskie was populated by the Polish-speaking gentry, Jews (primarily in towns), and Ruthenian Orthodox and Greek-Catholics speaking a dialect related to modern Ukrainian - the so-called Khakhlak (Chachlak) dialect, which derived its name from a derogatory term for Ukrainians (khakhol or khokhol being the name of the traditional haircut of Ukrainian Cossacks). In the 19th century, the inhabitants of Podlaskie were under the rule of the Russian Empire, with Southern Podlasie constituting a part of Russian-controlled Congress Poland. After 1831, Russian authorities forbade the Greek-Catholic faith in northern Podlaskie and it disappeared from the area. In 1875, Russians forbade this rite in Southern Podlasie as well, and all Greek-Catholic inhabitants were forced to accept the Eastern Orthodox faith. However, the resistance of the local people was surprisingly strong and Ruthenian speakers from this area rejected the Orthodox faith. In 1874, Wincenty Lewoniuk and 12 companions were killed by Russian soldiers in Pratulin. In reaction to these measures, the Ruthenians of Podlaskie began to identify themselves with the national movement of the Catholic Poles.

In 1912, Russian authorities issued a tolerance edict that made it possible to change confessions from Orthodox to Roman Catholic (but not to Greek-Catholic). A majority of the inhabitants of Southern Podlasie changed their faith from Orthodox to Roman Catholic. At present, very few people in Podlaskie continue speaking Ukrainian and nearly all consider themselves Poles. The counties along the border with Belarus are populated by Belarusians.

Podlaskie is also the cultural center of Poland's Tatar minority as well. After the annexation of eastern Poland into the Soviet Union following World War II, Poland was left with only 2 Tatar villages, Bohoniki and Kruszyniany. A significant number of the Tartars in the territories annexed to the USSR repatriated to Poland and clustered in cities, particularly Białystok.

A number of Polish Tatars from Podlaskie emigrated to the US at the beginning of 20th century and settled mostly in the north eastern states (although there is also an enclave in Florida). A small but active community of these descendants of Lipka Tatars still exists in New York City. "The Islamic Center of Polish Tatars" in New York City until recently had its own mosque in Brooklyn (106 Powers Street, Brooklyn, NY 11211 USA, originally build in 1928).
