= Demographics of Podgorica =

Podgorica is the capital and largest city of Montenegro. According to 2011 census, the population of Podgorica city proper is 150,799, while Podgorica Capital City (analogous to metropolitan area, and similar to opština/municipality subdivision in the rest of Montenegro) has a population of 185,937.

== Historical population ==
Historical population (city proper)
Year	Pop.	±%
1948	14,369	—
1953	19,868	+38.3%
1961	35,054	+76.4%
1971	61,727	+76.1%
1981	96,074	+55.6%
1991	116,235	+21.0%
2003	136,473	+17.4%
2011	150,799	+10.5%
Source: Monstat

Historical population (Metro area)
Year	Pop.	±%
1948	48,599	—
1953	55,669	+14.5%
1961	72,319	+29.9%
1971	98,796	+36.6%
1981	132,290	+33.9%
1991	146,121	+10.5%
2003	169,132	+15.7%
2011	185,937	+9.9%
Source: Monstat

== Households ==
Households (City proper)
Year	Pop.	±%
1948	4,030	—
1953	5,360	+33.0%
1961	9,549	+78.2%
1971	16,457	+72.3%
1981	25,152	+52.8%
1991	32,210	+28.1%
2003	40,090	+24.5%
2011	48,012	+19.8%
Source: Monstat

Households (Metro area)
Year	Pop.	±%
1948	11,074	—
1953	12,618	+13.9%
1961	17,287	+37.0%
1971	24,077	+39.3%
1981	32,581	+35.3%
1991	39,653	+21.7%
2003	48,416	+22.1%
2011	57,045	+17.8%
Source: Monstat

== Dwellings ==
Dwellings (City proper)
Year	Pop.	±%
1971	14,323	—
1981	22,560	+57.5%
1991	32,346	+43.4%
2003	44,277	+36.9%
2011	57,365	+29.6%
Source: Monstat

Dwellings (Metro area)
Year	Pop.	±%
1971	21,778	—
1981	30,304	+39.1%
1991	40,376	+33.2%
2003	56,708	+40.4%
2011	72,688	+28.2%
Source: Monstat

== Ethnicity ==
Ethnicity (2011 census)	City proper	Percentage (CP)	Metro area	Percentage (MA)
Montenegrins	90,970	60,25%	106,642	57,34%
Serbs	36,207	23,98%	43,248	23,25%
Romani	3,864	2,56%	3,988	2,14%
Ethnic Muslims	3,393	2,25%	4,122	2,22%
Bosniaks	2,630	1,74%	3,687	1,98%
Albanians	1,477	0,98%	9,538	5,13%
Croats	614	0,41%	664	0,36%
Undeclared	7,292	4,83%	8,892	4,78%
Other	4,530	3%	5,156	2,77%

== Religion ==
Religion (2011 census)	City proper	Percentage (CP)	Metro area	Percentage (MA)
Eastern Orthodoxy	122,969	81,45%	145,575	78,29%
Islam	14,962	9,91%	20,883	11,23%
Catholicism	2,735	1,81%	7,947	4,27%
Atheist	3,554	2,35%	3,698	1,99%
Other	6,757	4,48%	7,834	4,21%

== Population by subdivision ==
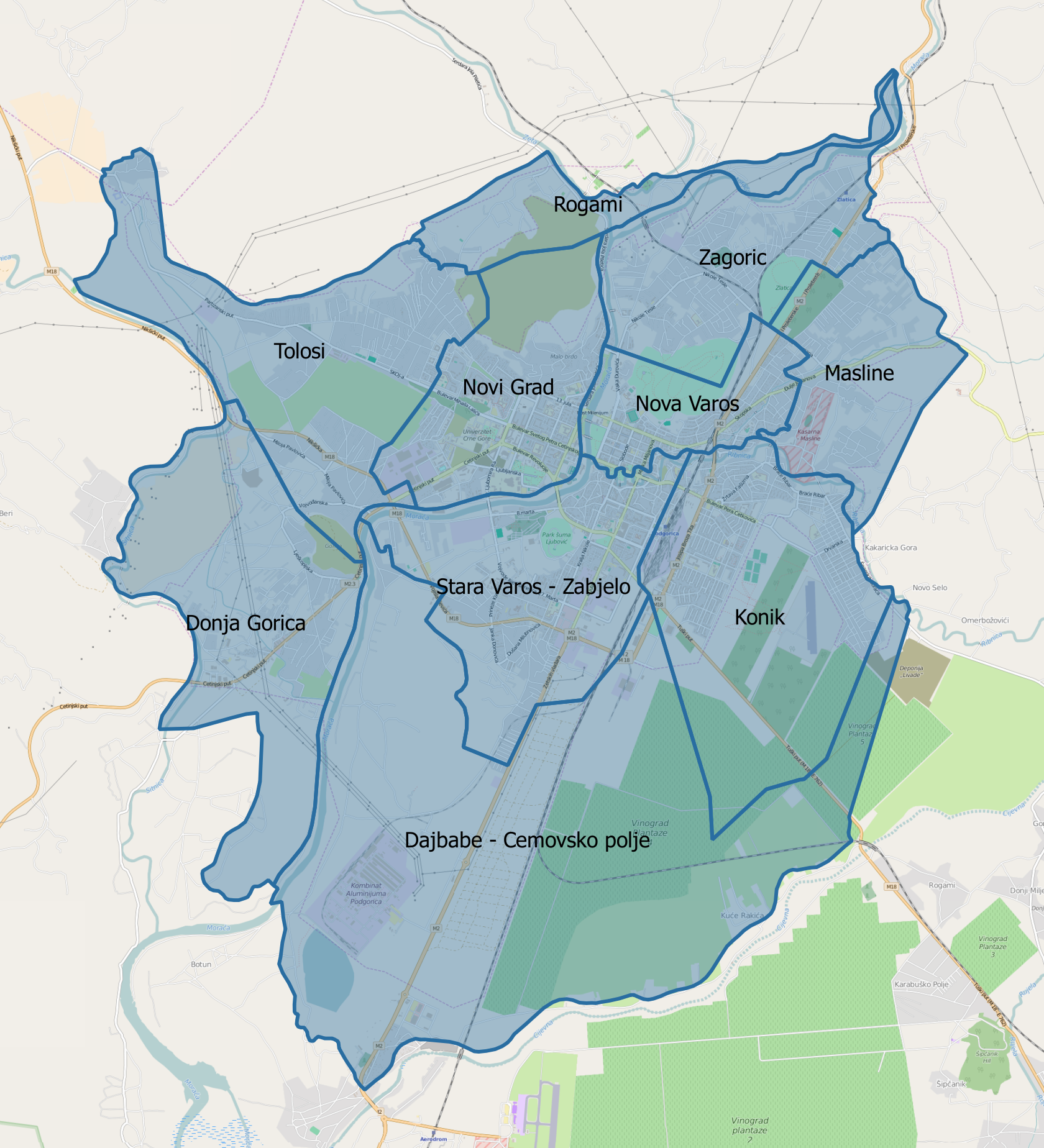
Planning zones of Podgorica

Settlements in Montenegro are organized into subdivisions known as Mjesna zajednica, or "local communities," which represent the smallest territorial units in the country. Despite their significance, the Montenegrin Statistical Office does not publish data specific to these local communities. In contrast, the administration of Podgorica Capital City has categorized the city into planning zones (planske cjeline) for internal purposes, accompanied by population statistics derived from the 2011 census. These planning zones do not align with local communities or traditional Podgorica neighborhoods but are illustrative of distribution of Podgorica population.

Discrepancies between data from the Capital City documents and the Montenegrin Statistical Office may arise from differences in definitions, the scope of the city proper, or the inclusion of preliminary data from the 2011 census.

Planning zone	Population	Area (km^{2})	Density (per km^{2})	Households	Dwellings
Nova Varoš	11,625	3,13	3,714	3,912	4,881
Novi Grad	26,413	5,88	4,492	9,192	11,987
Stara Varoš - Zabjelo	35,664	7,79	4,578	11,927	14,593
Konik	29,939	9,55	3,135	8,526	9,660
Masline	7,776	4,86	1,600	2,143	2,467
Zagorič	16,816	6,1	2,757	5,091	6,015
Rogami	1,760	2,96	595	536	662
Tološi	15,079	9,2	1,639	4,534	5,493
Donja Gorica	5,244	9,4	558	1,503	1,707
Dajbabe - Ćemovsko polje	2,286	26	88	648	755
Podgorica city proper	152,602	84,87	1,798	48,012	58,220

== Settlements of Metro area ==
The Capital City of Podgorica comprises 141 settlements, with three designated as urban by the Montenegrin Statistical Office—Podgorica city proper, Golubovci and Tuzi—while the rest exhibit rural characteristics. Golubovci and Tuzi serve as central hubs for their respective sub-municipalities (gradske opštine), covering a significant portion of the southern and southeastern areas of Podgorica Capital City, extending from Podgorica city proper to Skadar Lake. The Golubovci sub-municipality has a population of 16,093, while Tuzi sub-municipality is home to 12,096 residents.

Below is a list of settlements with populations exceeding 500 residents:

Settlement	Population
Podgorica	150,977
Tuzi	4,748
Golubovci	3,110
Mojanovići	2,593
Goričani	1,462
Mahala	1,346
Mataguži	1,292
Donji Kokoti	1,073
Balabani	1,014
Vranj	1,012
Srpska	880
Bijelo Polje	823
Gornji Milješ	742
Botun	697
Sukuruć	661
Grbavci	575
Beri	556
Donji Milješ	512
Dinoša	500

Most of the larger settlements are part of continuous rural sprawl around the towns of Golubovci and Tuzi in the Zeta Plain, located in the southern part of Podgorica Capital City. In contrast, the northern section of the Capital City area is characterized by mountainous terrain and sparse population.

The commuter belt of Podgorica extends beyond the city itself, reaching into the municipalities of Danilovgrad, Cetinje, Bar and Nikšić. Coupled with Podgorica's role as the primate city of Montenegro—serving as the focal point for national administrative, healthcare, educational, and economic activities—the daily population is likely considerably higher than the officially recorded resident population.
