= Demographics of Saint Paul, Minnesota =

Saint Paul is the capital city of the U.S. state of Minnesota and the county seat of Ramsey County. As of the 2024 American Community Survey, the city's population was estimated at 307,484.

== Population and age ==
The U.S. Census Bureau recorded St. Paul's population at 272,235 in the 1990 census. In the 2000 census, the population was recorded at 287,151; the 2008 American Community Survey estimate put the population at 269,188. In contrast, the Minnesota Department of Administration estimated the city's population at 288,055 in 2008, an increase of 904 people. In 2016 the estimated population had grown to 302,403 and there was further growth to 307,484 in 2024.

| Age | 2008 ACS | 2016 ACS | 2024 ACS |
|---|---|---|---|
| Under 5 years | 7.6% | 7.3% | 6.3% |
| 5 to 9 years | 6.6% | 7.3% | 6.2% |
| 10 to 14 years | 6.9% | 7.0% | 7.1% |
| 15 to 19 years | 7.8% | 6.6% | 6.9% |
| 20 to 24 years | 8.1% | 8.5% | 7.5% |
| 25 to 34 years | 14.8% | 18.3% | 17.9% |
| 35 to 44 years | 14.7% | 12.4% | 13.9% |
| 45 to 54 years | 14.1% | 11.8% | 10.5% |
| 55 to 59 years | 5.7% | 5.0% | 4.9% |
| 60 to 64 years | 3.6% | 5.4% | 5.6% |
| 65 to 74 years | 4.8% | 6.2% | 8.7% |
| 75 to 84 years | 3.5% | 2.6% | 3.4% |
| 85 years and older | 2.0% | 1.4% | 1.0% |
| Total | 269,188 | 302,403 | 307,484 |

== Households and families ==
According to the 2006–2008 American Community Survey, there were 108,708 households, of which 52.0% were family households and 48.0% were non-family households. Roughly 33.7% were married couples, and 15.7% had children under 18 years present. Roughly 4.7% of the households had a male householder with no wife present, and 13.6% had a female householder with no husband present. Roughly 38.8% of households consisted of a householder living alone, and 9.0% were consisted of a householder 65 years and over living alone. Approximately 28.8% of households consisted of one or more people under 18 years, and 17.9% consisted of one or more people 65 years and over. The average household size was 2.37 and the average family size was 3.29.

In the 2015 American Community Survey, there were an estimated 112,988 households, of which 54.62% were family households and 45.38% were non-family households. Married couples made up 35.35% were married couples. An estimated 5.04% of the households had a male householder with no wife present, and 14.22% had a female householder with no husband present. Roughly 35.3% of households consisted of a householder living alone while 10.0% of households were non-family households where the householders did not live alone.

== Employment, occupation, income, and poverty ==
According to the 2006–2008 American Community Survey, 70.2% of the population 16 years and over were in the labor force, while 29.8% were not in the labor force. Roughly 70.1% were in the civilian labor force, while 0.1% were in the armed forces. In 2024, 69.1% of the population 16 years and older was in the labor force (80.4% of the population between 20 and 64 years old). The unemployment rate was 4.7% for 16 years and older and 3.5% for 20 to 64 years.

In 2008, of the civilian employed population over 16 years, 41.1% had management, professional, and related occupations, 17.4% had service occupations, 23.9% had sales and office occupations, 0.3% had farming, fishing, and forestry occupations, 5.4% had construction, extraction, maintenance, and repair occupations, and 11.9% had production, transportation, and material moving occupations. In 2024 48.8% had management, business, science and arts occupations, 17.5% had service occupations, 4.1% had natural resource, construction and maintenance occupations, 16.1% had sales and office occupations, and 13.6% had production, transportation, and material moving occupations.

In 2008, the median household income was $46,628, and the median family income was $58,990. In 2024, the median household income was $70,182 and the median family income was $89,394.

In terms of poverty, 14.4% of all families and 7.1% of married-couple families lived below the poverty line. Of all people, 19.7% lived below the poverty line, including 28.1% of those under 18 years and 13.6% of those over 65 years.

== Race and ethnicity ==
=== 2020 census ===
Saint Paul, Minnesota – Racial and ethnic composition Note: the US Census treats Hispanic/Latino as an ethnic category. This table excludes Latinos from the racial categories and assigns them to a separate category. Hispanics/Latinos may be of any race.
| Race / Ethnicity (NH = Non-Hispanic) | Pop 2000 | Pop 2010 | Pop 2020 | % 2000 | % 2010 | % 2020 |
|---|---|---|---|---|---|---|
| White alone (NH) | 183,898 | 159,437 | 151,987 | 64.04% | 55.93% | 48.79% |
| Black or African American alone (NH) | 32,818 | 43,620 | 51,253 | 11.43% | 15.30% | 16.45% |
| Native American or Alaska Native alone (NH) | 2,806 | 2,316 | 2,112 | 0.98% | 0.81% | 0.68% |
| Asian alone (NH) | 35,311 | 42,494 | 59,755 | 12.30% | 14.91% | 19.18% |
| Pacific Islander alone (NH) | 178 | 120 | 117 | 0.06% | 0.04% | 0.04% |
| Other race alone (NH) | 572 | 494 | 1,488 | 0.20% | 0.17% | 0.48% |
| Mixed race or Multiracial (NH) | 8,853 | 9,276 | 14,731 | 3.08% | 3.25% | 4.73% |
| Hispanic or Latino (any race) | 22,715 | 27,311 | 30,084 | 7.91% | 9.58% | 9.66% |
| Total | 287,151 | 285,068 | 311,527 | 100.00% | 100.00% | 100.00% |

According to the 2006–2008 American Community Survey, the largest Asian ancestries in St. Paul are as follows:

- "Other Asian": 10.1% (mostly Hmong)
- Asian Indian: 0.6%
- Korean: 0.6%
- Vietnamese: 0.6%
- Chinese: 0.3%
- Filipino: 0.1%
- Japanese: 0.1%

Among St. Paul's multiracial population, people of mixed black and white ancestry made up over 1% of the city's population (1.2%). People of mixed white and American Indian ancestry made up 0.8% of the population; those of mixed white and Asian ancestry made up 0.5% of the population, and people of mixed black and American Indian ancestry made up 0.3% of St. Paul's population. Multiracial Americans made up 3.7% of the total population.

St. Paul's Hispanic and Latino population is predominately Mexican. Hispanics and Latinos make up 8.9% of the city's population, of which 6.6% are of Mexican descent. There is also a small Puerto Rican community making up 0.6% of the population.

As of 2001, the largest Hmong population in the United States by city is located in St. Paul. As of 2001, the St. Paul Public Schools had 46,000 students, and about one third of them were Hmong.

The eight largest European ancestries in St. Paul are as follows:

- German: 25.9%
- Irish: 13.5%
- Norwegian: 8.8%
- Swedish: 6.6%
- English: 6.4%
- French: 4.0%
- Polish: 3.9%
- Italian: 3.4%

== Place of birth and language ==
Out of the total population of 269,188, 84.6% were native, of which 83.8% were born in the United States and 0.8% were born in Puerto Rico, U.S. island areas, or born abroad to American parents. The remaining 15.4% were foreign-born. Out of the some 41,000 foreign-born, 41.6% were naturalized citizens and 58.4% were non-U.S. citizens. Out of the foreign-born population, Asia was the most common birthplace with 46.4% of foreigners originating from that continent. People born in Latin America and Africa represented 24.3% and 20.5% of the foreign-born population respectively. People born in Europe made up 6.5% of the foreign-born population; those born in other parts of North America represented 2.0% of the foreign-born populace. Lastly, people born in Oceania represented a mere 0.3% of St. Paul's foreign-born population.

In terms of language, 76.5% of St. Paul's population (over 5 years) spoke only English at home. The remaining 23.5% spoke non-English languages at home, of which 12.2% reported speaking English less than "very well". Spanish speakers made up 7.1% of the population; speakers of other Indo-European languages made up 2.1% of the populace. Speakers of Asian languages made up 10.9% of the population. The remaining 3.4% spoke other languages at home.
