= Demographics of Islamabad =

- Population pyramid of Islamabad in 2017
- Population: 1,014,825 (2017)

The demographics of Islamabad, the capital city of Pakistan, has undergone significant changes over the years. Built as a planned city in the 1960s and established in 1967, it replaced Karachi as Pakistan's national capital. Since the, Islamabad has attracted people from all over Pakistan, making it one of the most cosmopolitan and urbanised cities of Pakistan.

== Languages ==
Languages of Islamabad Capital Territory (2023 Pakistani census)
1. Punjabi (50.6%)
2. Pashto (18.2%)
3. Urdu (15.7%)
4. Hindko (6.16%)
5. Kashmiri (2.27%)
6. Saraiki (2.02%)
7. Sindhi (0.93%)
8. Balti (0.34%)
9. Shina (0.31%)
10. Kohistani (0.21%)
11. Balochi (0.19%)
12. Others (2.92%)

According to 2023 Pakistani census, There are 1,154,540 Punjabi, 415,838 Pashto, 358,922 Urdu, 140,780 Hindko, 51,920 Kashmiri, 46,270 Saraiki, 21,362 Sindhi, 10,315 Balti, 7,099 Shina, 5,016 Koshistani, 4,503 Balochi, 1,095 Mewati, 668 Brahvi, 182 Kalasha and 64,734 others, of total 2,283,244 speakers in Islamabad Capital Territory.

Urdu, the national and first official language of the country, is predominantly spoken within the city due to the ethnic mix of populations. English, the second official language, is also commonly understood.

The total migrant population of the city is 397,731, with the majority from Punjab (201,977). Around 116,614 of the migrated population came from Khyber Pakhtunkhwa, 75,143 from Sindh, 24,438 from Azad Kashmir, and 21,372 from other countries. Smaller populations emigrated from Federally Administered Tribal Areas, Balochistan, and Gilgit-Baltistan.

== Religion ==
Islam is the largest religion in the city, with 95.53% of the population Muslim. Per 1998 census in rural areas this percentage is 98.80%, while in urban areas the percentage of Muslims is 93.83%. The second largest religion is Christianity, with 4.07% of the population, 0.94% in rural areas and 5.70% in the city. Other minorities 0.39% of the population.

== Literacy ==
The majority of the population lies in the age group of 15–64 years, around 59.38%. Only 2.73% of the population is above 65 years of age; 37.90% is below the age of 15. Islamabad has the highest literacy rate in Pakistan, at 94%. 9.8% of the population has done intermediate education (equivalent to grades 11 and 12). 10.26% have a bachelor or equivalent degree while 5.2% have a master or equivalent degree. The labour force of Islamabad is 185,213 and the unemployment rate is 15.70%.

== See also ==
- Zoroastrianism in Islamabad Capital Territory
- Hinduism in Islamabad Capital Territory
