= Demographics of Białystok =

Historical population
Year	Pop.	±%
1857	13,787	—
1860	13,900	+0.8%
1880	34,500	+148.2%
1897	63,472	+84.0%
1889	56,629	−10.8%
1901	65,781	+16.2%
1910	80,300	+22.1%
1939	107,000	+33.3%
1946	56,759	−47.0%
1950	68,503	+20.7%
1955	97,192	+41.9%
1960	120,921	+24.4%
1965	139,986	+15.8%
1970	168,500	+20.4%
1975	195,861	+16.2%
1980	224,187	+14.5%
1990	270,568	+20.7%
2000	285,507	+5.5%
2006	294,830	+3.3%
2011	295,198	+0.1%
2015	295,981	+0.3%
2017	297,288	+0.4%
2019	297,554	+0.1%
2020	294,675	−1.0%
2021	293,413	−0.4%
2022	292,600	−0.3%
2023	291,688	−0.3%
2024	290,386	−0.4%

Historically Białystok has been a destination for internal and foreign immigration, especially from Central and Eastern Europe. In addition to the Polish minority in 19th century, there was a significant Jewish majority in Białystok. Following the end of the World War II and the inclusion of the city in the Polish People's Republic, its population became mostly homogeneous with the vast majority of its inhabitants being Poles. As of June 2024 the city has a population of 290,000.

== History ==
According to Russian census of 1897, out of the total population of 66,000, Jews constituted 41,900 (around 63%). In 1936, Białystok had a population of 99,722, of whom: 50.9% (50,758) were Poles, 42.6% (42,482) Jews, 2.1% (2,094) Germans and 0.4% (359) Russians. World War II changed all of this, in 1939, ca. 107,000 persons lived in Białystok, but in 1946 – only 56,759, and to this day there is much less ethnic diversity than in the previous 300 years of the city's history. Currently the city's population is 97% Polish, 2.5% Belarusian and 0.5% of a number of minorities including Russians, Lipka Tartars, Ukrainians and Romani. Most of the modern day population growth is based on internal migration and urbanization.

Religious tensions between the Catholics and the relatively large Orthodox community was felt when at the end of 1922, a discussion arose in the local paper Dziennik Białostocki about the purpose and use of the unused Orthodox cathedral building located on Wyzwolenia Square, the construction of which had begun in 1898 with contributions from the then society of Białystok. The pretext for starting a discussion on the future of the monumental building in the city center was an article published in "Dziennik Białostocki", in which voivode Stefan Popielawski was called "the advocate of aggressive Orthodoxy". This happened as a result of the voivode's office issuing permission for the Białystok Church Council to begin renovation work on the church. In connection with these activities, the Catholic residents filed a protest to the Ministry of Internal Affairs against the "sinister" activities of voivode Popielawski.

The largest population in Białystok occurred in 2020 as reported by GUS 297 585 people.

== National minorities ==
=== Belarusians ===
Białystok is a center of culture and society of Belarus (according to the census, they are almost 7,500, which represents 2.5% of residents of Białystok). There is a Belarus Consulate in the city, and organizations exist such as the Belarusian Social and Cultural Association, the Belarusian Youth Union, the Union of Belarus to Poland, the Belarusian Association of Literary Białowieza, Belarusian Historical Society, Belarusian Association of Journalists, Belarusian Students Association, Center for Civic Education, Poland-Belarus, Society of Belarusian Culture.

Białystok also hosts cultural events such as nationwide Festival "Belarusian Song" and Day of Belarusian Culture. Belarus Radio Right (Białoruskie Radio Racja) is based in the city and transmits radio programming to Belarus. There are a number of Belarusian-language newspapers: Niwa, Belarusian Historical Papers, Pravincyja and Czasopis.

=== Jews ===
Jewish community of Białystok traces its history to the city's early days. The community developed and by 1897 Jews made up about 66% of the city's population.

=== Russians ===
Russians are a minority, they are scattered around the territory of Poland but mostly reside in eastern Poland. There are 3244 Russians in Poland, living mainly in Białystok and the surrounding region, according to the 2002 census. The HFHR estimated around 13,000-15,000 Russians are in Poland. In Białystok, the main organization of work - Russian Cultural and Educational Association, organizing the Days of Russian Culture.

=== Tatars ===
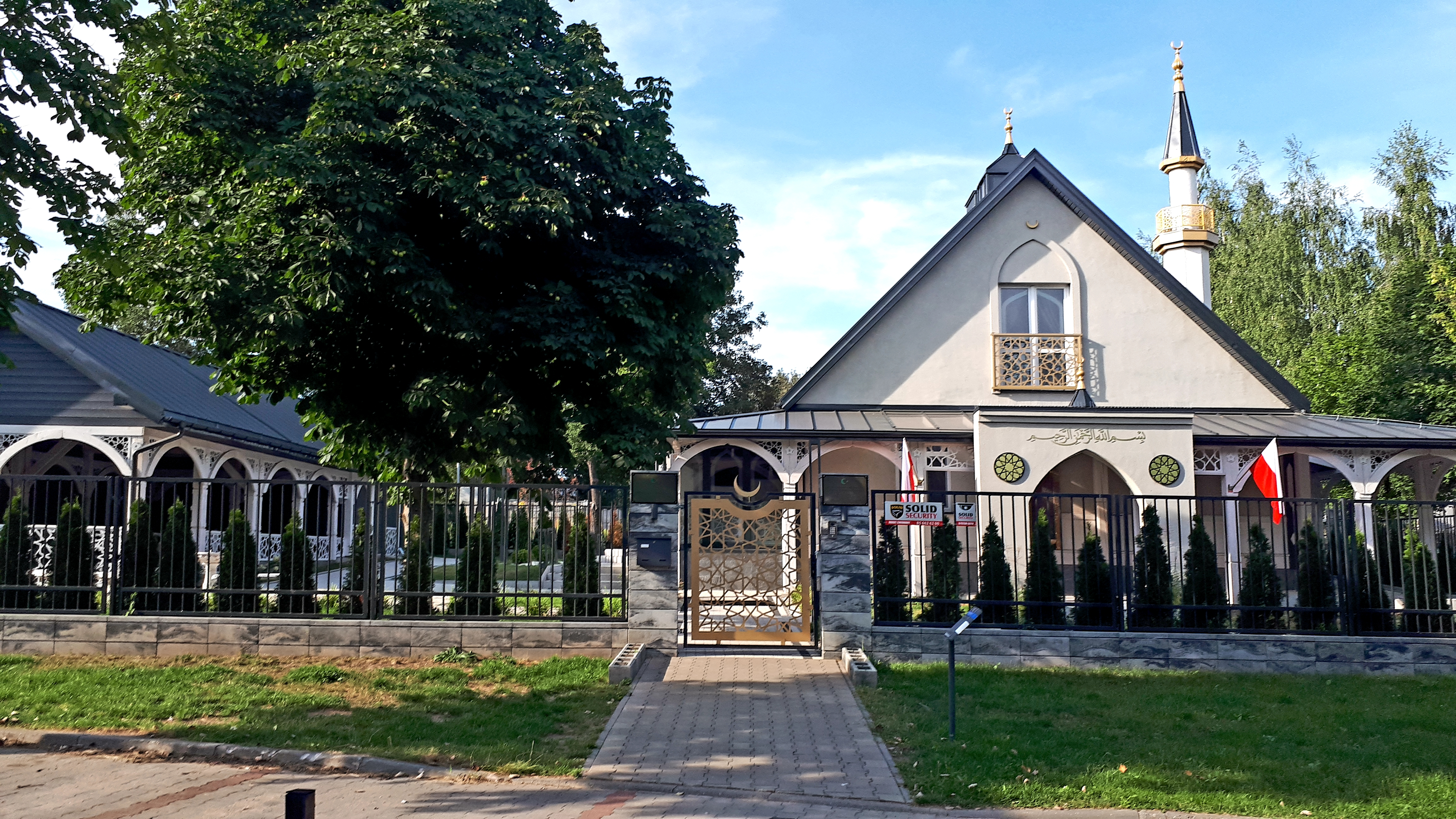
Mosque in Piasta I district in Białystok

The Lipka Tatar origins can be traced back to the descendant states of the Mongol Empire of Genghis Khan - the White Horde, the Golden Horde, the Crimean Khanate and Kazan Khanate. They initially served as a noble military caste but later they became urban-dwellers known for their crafts, horses and gardening skills. Throughout centuries they resisted assimilation and kept their traditional lifestyle. While they remained very attached to their religions, over time however, they lost their original Tatar language and for the most part adopted Polish.

Following the Polish–Soviet border agreement of August 1945, Poland was left with only 2 Tatar villages, Bohoniki and Kruszyniany. A significant number of the Tartars in the territories annexed to the USSR repatriated to Poland and clustered in or near Białystok. In Poland, the Tatar population reached approximately 100,000 in 1630 but the 2002 census showed only 447 people declaring this ethnicity.

In 1925 the Muslim Religion Association (Muzułmański Związek Religijny) was formed in Białystok. In 1992, the Organization of Tatars of the Polish Republic (Związek Tatarów Rzeczypospolitej Polskiej) with autonomous branches in Białystok and Gdańsk began operating. The Białystok branch issues a magazine called Life Tatar. The plan is to establish in Bialystok an 'Institute for the History of the Tartars.

=== Other nationalities ===
In Bialystok there are other minorities:

- Romani - Emigration of Polish Romani to Germany in the late 1980s reduced Poland's Romani population by as much as 75 percent. In Białystok the Central Council of Roma work in Poland, and publish a monthly magazine, Rromano po Drom
- Ukrainians - According to the census 417 Ukrainians live in Białystok, There are two civic societies in the city, the Association of Ukrainians of Podlasie and Association of Independent Ukrainian Youth.
