= Demographics of Utica, New York =

This article on the demographics of Utica contains information on population characteristics of Utica, New York, including households, family status, age, gender, income, race and ethnicity.

== Population and households ==
The 2010 United States census reported that the population of the city was 62,235, with a population density of 3,818.1 people per square mile (1,474.2 people/km^{2}). In Utica, there were 28,166 housing units at an average density of 1,696.7 per square mile (655.1/km^{2}). The city is the tenth-most populous in New York, the seat of Oneida County, and the focal point of the six-county Mohawk Valley region, along with the city of Schenectady. The U.S. Census reported that the Utica–Rome Metropolitan Statistical Area decreased in population from 299,397 in 2010 to 296,615 as of July 1, 2014.

As of 2010, the city's ages ranged from 15,386 (24.7%) of people under the age of 18, 7,721 (12.4%) from 18 to 24, 15,345 (24.7%) from 25 to 44, 14,562 (23.4%) from 45 to 64, and 9,221 (14.8%) who were 65 years of age or older. The median age was 34.8 years. For every 100 females, there were 92.6 males. For every 100 females age 18 and over, there were 89.3 males.

The 2010 Census reported that there were 25,100 households, out of which 27.0% had children under the age of 18 living with them, 35.5% were married couples living together, 16.9% had a female householder with no husband present, and 43.3% were non-families. 37.4% of all households were made up of individuals, and 15.5% had someone living alone who was 65 years of age or older. The average household size was 2.28 and the average family size was 3.04.

The median income for a household in the city was $24,916, and the median income for a family was $33,818. Males had a median income of $27,126 versus $21,676 for females. The per capita income for the city was $15,248. About 19.8% of families and 24.5% of the population were below the poverty line, including 38.0% of those under age 18 and 12.1% of those age 65 and over.

Historical population
Census	Pop.	Note	%±
1850	17,565		—
1860	22,529		28.3%
1870	28,804		27.9%
1880	33,914		17.7%
1890	44,007		29.8%
1900	56,383		28.1%
1910	74,419		32.0%
1920	94,156		26.5%
1930	101,740		8.1%
1940	100,518		−1.2%
1950	100,489		0.0%
1960	100,410		−0.1%
1970	91,611		−8.8%
1980	75,632		−17.4%
1990	68,637		−9.2%
2000	60,523		−11.8%
2010	62,235		2.8%
2020	65,283		4.9%
U.S. Decennial Census

== Race and ethnicity ==
Utica is an ethnically and culturally diverse city with a long history of ethnic minorities and is a significant refugee city.

The largest ethnic group present is, according to the 2013 American Community Survey, Italian American, constituting (20%) of the city population and the major traditional voting block.

The remainder of sizable ethnic groups include, as approximations: Slavs (18%) broken down as Poles (8.3%), Bosnians (7%) and Eastern Slavs at a combined (2.7%). Irish meanwhile constitute (11.3%), African American (10.5%), German (10.3%), ethnically English or American residents (8%), Puerto Rican (6.8%). Burmese (3.5%), French and French-Canadian (2.7%), Arab and Lebanese (2%), (non-Hispanic) Caribbean West Indies (1.8%), Dominican (1.5%), Vietnamese (1.5%) and Cambodian (.7%). Iroquois or other (non-Hispanic) Amerindian (.3%).

Notably, inhabitants of Utica frequently interact with the nearby territories of the Oneida Nation.

According to the current US census, sociopolitical conventions on race, the population may be broken down as:

Racial composition	2010	1990	1970	1950
White	69.0%	86.7%	94.1%	98.4%
—Non-Hispanic	64.5%	84.8%	91.2%	n/a
Black or African American	15.3%	10.5%	5.6%	1.6%
Hispanic or Latino (of any race)	10.5%	3.4%	0.9% (Note: Population estimate from a 15 percent sample.)	n/a
Asian	7.4%	1.1%	0.1%	n/a
Other race	3.9%	1.5%	0.1%	n/a
Two or more races	4.0%	n/a	n/a	n/a

Note on Amerindians: The Iroquois' Nations have repeatedly responded to census requests by responding that they do not appreciate the United States attempting to take census information of their citizens without authorization and while affronting their national sovereignty.

Looking at today's demography in waves, historically the Oneida and other Iroquois peoples controlled all of what is now Upstate New York.

The French and Dutch were the first Old World traders in the region. Towards the end of the Colonial period, the English and Germans settled in this region, the four groups today constitute a combined approximately (21%) of the population.

Later, Italians and Irish immigrants, who were heavily discriminated against in the New World, found a home in and would come to dominate the politics of the city, today pulling it strongly Democrat. They constitute (31.3%) of the population.

African Americans having fled from the South for greater freedom and economic mobility account for approximately (10.5%) of the city.

Eastern Europeans and Asians who were initially barred mass entry in the twentieth century due to American perceptions of race, and who today make up a large share of the refugee population, together account for (25%).

Latin Americans today account for approximately (10.5%).

== National origin ==
In 1914, Utica had a population of around 80 thousand people, of which a third were foreign-born. Of that number, about 7,000 were Italians, 4,000 were Poles, more than 3,000 were Germans, more than 2,000 were from Ireland, less than 1,400 were from England, over 1,000 were from Wales, and 500 from present-day Syria and Lebanon. 1,500 Jews lived in Utica.

=== Refugees and immigrants ===
The arrival of a large number of immigrants since the 1990s has stanched the city's population loss that had been steady for more than three decades. With almost 60% percent of the city's population under 50 in 2006, the city has amassed a large group of younger refugees. According to the Mohawk Valley Resource Center for Refugees, one quarter of Utica's population is represented by refugee families, with groups settling from countries including Bosnia and Herzegovina, Vietnam, Italy, Thailand, and Belarus. Bosnian Americans make up the largest nationality of recent immigrants in the city, numbering over 8,000. Other recent immigrant groups include Burmese, Sudanese, and Somali Bantu.

== Languages ==
As of 2000, 80.34% (45,150) of city residents age 5 and older spoke English at home as a primary language, while 5.01% (2,815) spoke Spanish, 4.59% (2,579) Bosnian, 2.40% (1,350) Italian, 1.68% (944) Polish, 1.58% (890) Russian, 1.54% (865) Vietnamese, 0.71% (400) Ukrainian, 0.59% (330) Arabic, 0.46% (260) German, 0.32% (178) French, and Belarusian languages were spoken as a main language by 0.47% (152) of the population over the age of five. In total, 19.66% (11,050) of Utica's population over the age of 5 spoke a native language other than English.

== Politics ==
Historically, much of East Utica, a predominantly Italian neighborhood, has leaned Democratic. Compared to the rest of Oneida County, Utica leans Democratic while the county leans Republican.
