= Demographics of Hyderabad =

Hyderabad Population
Year	Pop.	±%
1971	1,796,000	—
1981	2,546,000	+41.8%
1991	4,359,262	+71.2%
2001	5,637,483	+29.3%
2011	7,674,689	+36.1%
World Gazetteer

Today the city of Hyderabad, India covers an area of 625 square kilometres (241 sq mi), has a population of 6,809,970 making it the fourth most populous city in India. There are 3,500,802 male and 3,309,168 female citizens. The area under the municipality increased from 170 square kilometres (66 sq mi) to 625 square kilometres (241 sq mi) in 2007 when the Greater Hyderabad Municipal Corporation was created. As a consequence, the total population leaped from 3,637,483 in 2001 census to 6,809,970 in 2011 census, an increase of over 87%. By comparison, the city population in 1897 was 415,039.

Migrants from rest of India constitute 24% of the city population. The sex ratio is 945 female per 1000 males, higher than the national average of 926 per 1000. Among children aged 0–6 years, 373,794 are boys and 352,022 are girls giving rise to the ratio of 942 girls per 1000 boys. The city's population density is 18,480/km^{2} (47,900/sq mi). Hyderabad city's literacy rate is 82.96% (male 85.96% and female 79.79%), higher than the national average of 74.04%. Hyderabad city is governed by Greater Hyderabad Municipal Corporation that comes under the Hyderabad Urban Agglomeration, which has a population of 7.7 million the sixth most populous urban agglomeration in the country, with 3,985,240 males and 3,764,094 are females. A proposal to expand the area covered by the city to make it 721 square kilometres (278 sq mi) by merging the surrounding gram panchayats and around 30 villages is being considered, as of 2009.

== History of census ==
The first census in Hyderabad State was conducted on 17 February 1881, synchronously with the rest of British India. It was a massive, covert, single-night administrative operation executed entirely by moonlight, resulting in a total enumerated population of 3,67,417 residents in city of Hyderabad. The total population of the erstwhile Hyderabad State was recorded at 9,845,594. The city of Hyderabad, for census purposes, included the municipality of Chaderghat, Secunderabad and Bolarum cantonments and the Residency Bazaars, according to the 1901 Census report.

== Ethnic groups, Language and Religion ==
Residents of Hyderabad are called Hyderabadi. They are predominantly the Telugu people (mostly Hindu)and native Hyderabadi Muslims. The minority communities of Hyderabad are Kannadiga (including Nawayathi), Marwari, Odia, Bengali, Tamil, Malayali, Gujarati, Marathis, Hindavi, Sindhi, Iranian, Punjabi, Pathan, and Turkic. Among the foreign-origin communities Yemeni Arabs form the majority with African Arabs, Iranian, Pathani and Turkic as minorities - who kept settling here during Muslim rule, but which declined after the accession of Hyderabad State into the Indian Union.

Telugu and Urdu are the official languages of Hyderabad, while English is commonly used. Telugu in Hyderabad has a varied dialect called the Telangana dialect, and the Urdu spoken in the city is called Deccani Urdu. A significant population of the city speaks different languages such as Hindi, Marathi, Odia, Bengali, Kannada, Tamil and Malayalam.

Religions in Greater Hyderabad City
Religion	Percent
Hindus	64.93%
Muslims	30.13%
Christians	2.75%
Others†	2.19%
Distribution of religions †Includes Jains (0.29%), Sikhs (0.25%).

Though Hindus form a majority of the population, Muslims have substantial presence across the city and are predominant in and around Old City. The other religious communities are Christian, Sikh, Jain, Buddhist and Zoroastrian. Iconic temples, mosques and churches are housed in the city. After the expansion of city limits and formation of Greater Hyderabad Municipal Corporation in 2007, the Hyderabad city's religious statistics of 2011 census are: Hindus (64.93%), Muslims (30.13%), Christians (2.75%), Jains (0.29%), Sikhs (0.25%), Buddhists (0.04%) and remaining others. The population of Hyderabad district is 39.43 lakhs, where Hindus are 20.46 lakhs (51.89%) and Muslims are 17.13 lakhs (43.35%).

== See also ==
- Demographics of Telangana
- Hyderabadi Muslims
