= Demographics of Lahore =

Historical population
Year	Pop.	±%
1700	400,000	—
1881	138,878	−65.3%
1891	159,947	+15.2%
1901	186,884	+16.8%
1911	228,687	+22.4%
1921	281,781	+23.2%
1931	400,075	+42.0%
1941	671,659	+67.9%
1951	1,130,000	+68.2%
1961	1,630,000	+44.2%
1972	2,198,890	+34.9%
1981	2,988,486	+35.9%
1998	6,340,114	+112.2%
2017	11,119,985	+75.4%
2023	13,004,135	+16.9%

According to the 2023 Census of Pakistan, Lahore district has a total population of 13,004,135 people, making it the 2nd most populous city of Pakistan after Karachi with a population density of 7338.7 people per km^{2}.

== Demographics ==
Latest estimates as of 2025 rank Lahore as the 20th most populous city in the world. The results of the 2023 Census determined the population of Lahore to be 13,004,135, with an annualized growth rate of 2.65% since 2017 Census. Average household size in Lahore is 6.4 persons.

Gender-wise, 52.9% of the population is male, 47.1% is female, and 0.026% are transgender. Lahore has a literacy rate of 79.6% (male 81.41% & female 77.59%), one of the highest in Pakistan. In terms of employment, Lahore has an eligible population of 9,746,671 people of which 609,351 or just 6.25% are unemployed.

It is a demographically young city, with over 45% of its inhabitants below the age of 20. Age distribution follows a typical population pyramid as shown below:

Age bracket	Total	Male	Female
70+ years	244,270	148,232	96,038
60-69 years	506,452	283,440	223,012
50-59 years	830,017	453,807	376,210
40-49 years	1,334,007	724,989	609,018
30-39 years	1,860,468	969,859	890,609
20-29 years	2,302,674	1,204,342	1,098,332
10-19 years	2,668,783	1,417,933	1,250,850
0-9 years	3,231,990	1,670,348	1,561,642

== Religion ==
Majority of the population living in Lahore follow Islam.

Religious groups in Lahore City (1881−2023) (Note: 1881-1941: Data for the entirety of the town of Lahore, which included Lahore Municipality and Lahore Cantonment.)
Religious group	1881		1891		1901		1911		1921		1931		1941		2017		2023	
Religious group	Pop.	%	Pop.	%	Pop.	%	Pop.	%	Pop.	%	Pop.	%	Pop.	%	Pop.	%	Pop.	%
Islam	86,413	57.85%	102,280	57.83%	119,601	58.93%	129,801	56.76%	149,044	52.89%	249,315	58.01%	433,170	64.49%	10,530,816	94.7%	12,363,149	95.07%
Hinduism	53,641	35.91%	62,077	35.1%	70,196	34.59%	77,267	33.79%	107,783	38.25%	139,125 (Note: 1931-1941: Including Ad-Dharmis)	32.37%	179,422	26.71%	2,670	0.02%	2,487	0.02%
Sikhism	4,627	3.1%	7,306	4.13%	7,023	3.46%	12,877	5.63%	12,833	4.55%	23,477	5.46%	34,021	5.07%	—N/a	—N/a	715	0.006%
Christianity	529 (Note: Only includes protestant population.)	0.35%	4,697	2.66%	5,558	2.74%	8,436	3.69%	11,287	4.01%	16,875	3.93%	21,495	3.2%	571,365	5.14%	602,431	4.63%
Jainism	227	0.15%	339	0.19%	420	0.21%	467	0.2%	474	0.17%	791	0.18%	1,094	0.16%	—N/a			
Zoroastrianism	—N/a	—N/a	132	0.07%	166	0.08%	198	0.09%	177	0.06%	150	0.03%	—N/a	—N/a	—N/a	—N/a	77	0.0006%
Judaism	—N/a	—N/a	14	0.01%	—N/a	—N/a	13	0.01%	13	0%	—N/a	—N/a	—N/a	—N/a	—N/a	—N/a		
Buddhism	—N/a	—N/a	—N/a	—N/a	—N/a	—N/a	128	0.06%	170	0.06%	14	0%	—N/a	—N/a	—N/a	—N/a		
Ahmadiyya	—N/a	—N/a	—N/a	—N/a	—N/a	—N/a	—N/a	—N/a	—N/a	—N/a	—N/a	—N/a	—N/a	—N/a	13,433	0.12%	7,139	0.055%
Others	3,932	2.63%	9	0.01%	0	0%	0	0%	0	0%	0	0%	2,457	0.37%	1,701	0.02%	2,339	0.018%
Total population	149,369		176,854		202,964		228,687		281,781		429,747		671,659		11,119,985		13,004,135	

== Language ==
Languages by number of speakers in the Lahore district
1. Punjabi (73.6%)
2. Urdu (21.1%)
3. Other (5.30%)

Punjabi is the native language of the province and is the most widely spoken language in Lahore. Punjabi is the primary means of communication in both the city and adjoining rural areas. Punjabi has no official status in Lahore and some Punjabi activists have raised demands for recognition of Punjabi. Urdu, as the lingua franca of Pakistan, is widely used as the form of informal communication in the industrial and corporate sector. English has become increasingly popular with educated and younger people due to its official status in government and preferred language status for business. Many Punjabi speakers in Lahore are known as Majha Dialect Of Punjabi.

According to the 2023 census, 73.6% or 9.55 million people of the population are Punjabis; 21.1% or 2.74 million are Urdu speakers.

Mother Tongue (2023)
Punjabi	9,549,169
Urdu	2,742,020
Pashto	267,809
Mewati	260,544
Saraiki	62,016
Hindko	33,061
Sindhi	27,074
Balochi	4,266
Kohistani	543
Brahvi	176
Other Language	31,983
