= Demographics of Rotselaar =

This table shows the total population of the Municipality of Rotselaar in Belgium, as well as that of each of its constituent communes, on January 1 of each year since the merger of Rotselaar, Werchter and Wezemaal in 1977.

== Population ==
Date	Population	Rotselaar	Werchter	Wezemaal	Growth	Families
1977	10454	5,068	2,207	3,179		
1978	10531	5108	2227	3196	77	
1979	10677	5156	2298	3223	146	3543
1980	10916	5276	2357	3283	239	
1981	11145	5390	2415	3340	229	
1982	11251	5743	2282	3226	106	
1983	11436	5835	2329	3272	185	
1984	11521	5951	2316	3254	85	
1985	11644	6028	2367	3249	123	
1986	11733	6078	2390	3265	89	
1987	11797	6142	2390	3265	64	4200
1988	11957	6260	2457	3240	160	4347
1989	12231	6408	2544	3279	274	4542
1990	12506	6562	2598	3346	275	
1991	12809	6788	2644	3377	303	
1992	13046	6918	2741	3387	237	
1993	13355	7139	2810	3406	309	4937
1994	13739	7394	2903	3440	382	5057
1995	13915	7583	2932	3400	178	5201
1996	14194	7780	2984	3430	279	5295
1997	14404	7940	3004	3460	210	5348
1998	14463	7974	3009	3480	59	
1999	14561	8080	3003	3478	98	5493
2000	14584	8119	2977	3488	23	
2001	14641	8095	2999	3547	57	
2002	14680	8156	2998	3526	39	5654
2003	14790	8217	2992	3581	110	5699
2004	14868	8302	3041	3525	78	
2005	15006	8355	3093	3558	138	
2006	15067	8332	3142	3573	66	5881

Source: The section on demographics, on the official website of Rotselaar. (in Dutch)

== Age structure ==
	January 1, 2000		January 1, 2006	
	Number	%	Number	%
Population	14,587	100	15,068	100
0-20	3,637	24.9	3,581	23.8
20-64	8,784	60.2	9,054	60.1
65+	2,166	14.8	2,433	16.1
Male	7,290	100	7,511	100
0-20	1,847	25.3	1,858	24.7
20-64	4,457	61.1	4,573	60.9
65+	986	13.5	1,080	14.4
Female	7,297	100	7,557	100
0-20	1,790	24.5	1,723	22.8
20-64	4,327	59.3	4,481	59.3
65+	1,180	16.2	1,353	17.9
Median age	38		40	

Source: Statistics Belgium, Kerncijfers voor de gemeente Rotselaar. (in Dutch)

== Households ==
	2000		2004	
	Number	%	Number	%
Single men	569	10.3	612	10.6
Single women	632	11.4	765	13.2
Households of 2 persons	1,828	33.0	1,934	33.4
Households of 3 persons	1,013	18.3	1,013	17.5
Households of 4 persons	989	17.9	957	16.5
Households of 5 persons	388	7.0	385	6.7
Households of 6 persons	87	1.6	93	1.6
Households of 7 persons	20	0.4	16	0.3
Households of 8 persons	10	0.2	11	0.2
Collective households (Note: Collective households include structurally separate and independent places of abode intended for habitation by large groups of individuals or several households, including religious communities, retirement homes, etc.)	1	0.0	2	0.0
Total number of households	5,537	100	5,788	100

== See also ==
- Demographics of Belgium
- Rotselaar
- Werchter
