= Demographics of Bristol =

- Population pyramid of Bristol
- Population: 472,500 (2021)

Bristol, England is the tenth most populous city in the United Kingdom.

== Population ==
Bristol's total population, according to the 2021 census, was 472,500. The population density was 4,308.1 people per square km.

== Ethnicity ==
Ethnic makeup of Bristol by single year ages in 2021

The population of the city of Bristol was historically ethnically homogeneous, White British, but is now polyethnic, with the largest ethnic group, White British, constituting 71.6% of the population in the 2021 census. This proportion has consistently declined in each modern census, down from 88.0% in the 2001 census.

In the 2021 census, the ethnic composition of the city of Bristol comprised: 81.1% White, 6.6% Asian, 5.9% Black, 4.5% Mixed, and 1.9% Other.

The following table shows the ethnic group of respondents in the 1991, 2001, 2011, and 2021 censuses in Bristol.

Ethnic Group	1971 estimations		1981 estimations		1991 census		2001 census		2011 census		2021 census	
Ethnic Group	Number	%	Number	%	Number	%	Number	%	Number	%	Number	%
White: Total	396,543	97.7%	381,764	95.7%	376,418	94.8%	349,530	91.83%	359,592	83.97%	383,142	81.1%
White: British	–	–	–	–	–	–	335,085	88.04%	333,432	77.86%	338,452	71.6%
White: Irish	–	–	–	–	5,571	1.48%	4,321	1.14%	3,851	0.90%	4288	0.9%
White: Gypsy or Irish Traveller (Note: New category created for the 2011 census)	–	–	–	–	–	–	–	–	359	0.08%	273	0.1%
White: Roma	–	–	–	–	–	–	–	–	–	–	966	0.2%
White: Other	–	–	–	–	–	–	10,124	2.66%	21,950	5.13%	39,163	8.3%
Asian or Asian British: Total	–	–	6,583	1.6%	8,479	2.1%	13,008	3.42%	23,655	5.52%	31,269	6.7%
Asian or Asian British: Indian	–	–	2,420		2,969		4,595	1.21%	6,547	1.53%	8,302	1.8%
Asian or Asian British: Pakistani	–	–	2,422		2,931		4,050	1.06%	6,863	1.60%	9,064	1.9%
Asian or Asian British: Bangladeshi	–	–	334		602		1,230	0.32%	2,104	0.49%	2,616	0.6%
Asian or Asian British: Chinese (Note: In 2001, listed under the 'Chinese or other ethnic group' heading.)	–	–	867		1,165		2,149	0.56%	3,886	0.91%	5,466	1.2%
Asian or Asian British: Other Asian	–	–	540		812		984	0.26%	4,255	0.99%	5,821	1.2%
Black or Black British: Total	–	–	8,599	2.2%	9,507	2.4%	8,831	2.32%	25,734	6.01%	27,890	5.8%
Black or Black British: African	–	–	678		786		2,310	0.61%	12,085	2.82%	18,149	3.8%
Black or Black British: Caribbean	–	–	5,918	1.5%	6,409	1.6%	5,585	1.47%	6,727	1.57%	6,803	1.4%
Black or Black British: Other Black	–	–	2,003		2,312		936	0.25%	6,922	1.62%	2,938	0.6%
Mixed: Total	–	–	–	–	–	–	7,934	2.08%	15,438	3.61%	21,116	4.5%
Mixed: White and Black Caribbean	–	–	–	–	–	–	3,871	1.02%	7,389	1.73%	7,714	1.6%
Mixed: White and Black African	–	–	–	–	–	–	755	0.20%	1,533	0.36%	2,621	0.6%
Mixed: White and Asian	–	–	–	–	–	–	1,652	0.43%	3,402	0.79%	5,556	1.2%
Mixed: Other Mixed	–	–	–	–	–	–	1,656	0.44%	3,114	0.73%	5,225	1.1%
Other: Total	–	–	2,135		2,595		1,312	0.34%	3,815	0.89%	9,050	1.9%
Other: Arab (Note: New category created for the 2011 census)	–	–	–	–	–	–	–	–	1,272	0.30%	2,540	0.5%
Other: Any other ethnic group	–	–	–	–	–	–	1,312	0.34%	2,543	0.59%	6,510	1.4%
Ethnic minority: Total	9,499	2.3%	17,317	4.3%	20,581	5.2%	31,085	8.2%	68,642	16%	89,325	18.9%
Total	406,042	100%	399,081	100%	396,999	100%	380,615	100%	428,234	100%	472,467	100%

Notes for table above

Distribution of ethnic groups in Bristol according to the 2011 census.
White

White-British

White-Irish

White-Other

Asian

Asian-Indian

Asian-Pakistani

Asian-Bangladeshi

Asian-Chinese

Black

Black-African

Black-Caribbean

Other-Arab

Ethnic group	School year					
Ethnic group	1971		1998		2021/2022	
Ethnic group	Number	%	Number	%	Number	%
White: Total	–	96.1%	37,460	86.7%	42,959	67.9%
White: British	–	–			37,628	59.5%
White: Irish	–	–			175	
White: Traveller of Irish heritage	–	–			44	
White: Gypsy/Roma	–	–			110	
White: Other	–	–			5,002	
Asian / Asian British: Total	–	–			5,380	8.5%
Asian / Asian British: Indian	–	–			1,337	
Asian / Asian British: Pakistani	–	–			1,969	
Asian / Asian British: Bangladeshi	–	–			524	
Asian / Asian British: Chinese	–	–			396	
Asian / Asian British: Other Asians	–	–			1,154	
Black / Black British: Total	–	–			6,649	10.5%
Black: Caribbean	–	–			905	
Black: African	–	–			4,731	
Black: Other Blacks	–	–			1,013	
Mixed / British Mixed	–	–	–	–	5,999	9.5%
Other: Total	–	–			977	1.5%
Unclassified	–	–	719	1.9%	1,309	2.1%
Non-White: Total	–	3.9%	–	13.5%	19,005	32.1%
Total:	–	100%	43,224	100%	63,273	100%

== Religion ==
Religion in the city of Bristol (2021 United Kingdom census)
1. Christian (32.2%)
2. No religion (51.4%)
3. Muslim (6.70%)
4. Hindu (0.80%)
5. Buddhist (0.60%)
6. Sikh (0.50%)
7. Jewish (0.30%)
8. Other religion (0.80%)
9. Not stated (6.90%)

The table below shows data regarding religion in Bristol for the 2001, 2011, and 2021 censuses.

Religion	2001		2011		2021	
Religion	Number	%	Number	%	Number	%
No religion	93,322	24.52	160,218	37.41	242,864	51.4
Holds religious beliefs	251,989	66.20	233,234	54.47	197,180	41.7
Christian	236,239	62.07	200,254	46.76	152,126	32.2
Muslim	7,664	2.01	22,016	5.14	31,776	6.7
Buddhist	1,614	0.42	2,549	0.60	2,710	0.6
Hindu	2,131	0.56	2,712	0.63	3,545	0.8
Sikh	1,778	0.47	2,133	0.50	2,247	0.5
Jewish	823	0.22	777	0.18	1,228	0.3
Other religion	1,740	0.46	2,793	0.65	3,546	0.8
Religion not stated	35,304	9.28	34,782	8.12	32,423	6.9
Total population	380,615	100.0	428,234	100.0	472,467	100.0

Distribution of religions in Bristol according to the 2011 census.
Christianity

Islam

Judaism

Hinduism

Sikhism

Buddhism

Other religion

No religion

== Languages ==
The most common main languages spoken in Bristol according to the 2011 census are listed below.

Rank	Language	Usual residents aged 3+	Proportion
1	English	374,709	91.46%
2	Polish	6,080	1.48%
3	Somali	5,004	1.22%
4	Urdu	1,432	0.35%
5	French	1,403	0.34%
6	Spanish	1,329	0.32%
7	Punjabi	1,306	0.32%
8	Arabic	1,103	0.27%
9	Bengali (with Sylheti and Chatgaya)	983	0.24%
10	Italian	964	0.24%
11	Portuguese	850	0.21%
12	German	732	0.18%
13	Hungarian	664	0.16%
14	Malayalam and Tamil	663	0.16%
15	Russian	536	0.13%
16	Tagalog/Filipino	531	0.13%
17	Kurdish	516	0.13%
18	Romanian	503	0.12%
19	Greek	494	0.12%
20	Slovak	493	0.12%
	Other	9,403	2.30%

== See also ==
- Demographics of the United Kingdom
- Demographics of England
- Demographics of London
- Demographics of Birmingham
- Demographics of Greater Manchester
- List of English cities by population
- List of English districts by population
- List of English districts and their ethnic composition
- List of English districts by area
- List of English districts by population density
