= Demographics of Tulsa, Oklahoma =

Tulsa is the second largest city of the U.S. state of Oklahoma and the county seat of Tulsa County. The city was estimated in 2011 by the U.S. Census Bureau to have 396,466 residents.

== Demographics ==
Historical population
| Census | Pop. | Note | %± |
|---|---|---|---|
| 1900 | 1,390 | | — |
| 1910 | 18,182 | | 1,208.1% |
| 1920 | 72,075 | | 296.4% |
| 1930 | 141,258 | | 96.0% |
| 1940 | 142,157 | | 0.6% |
| 1950 | 182,740 | | 28.5% |
| 1960 | 261,685 | | 43.2% |
| 1970 | 330,350 | | 26.2% |
| 1980 | 360,919 | | 9.3% |
| 1990 | 367,302 | | 1.8% |
| 2000 | 393,049 | | 7.0% |
| 2010 | 391,906 | | −0.3% |
| 2019 (est.) | 401,190 | | 2.4% |
U.S. Decennial Census; 2011 estimate

As of the U.S. Census of 2010, there were 391,906 people, 163,975 households, and 95,246 families residing in the city of Tulsa. The population density was 1,991.9 inhabitants per square mile (769.1/km^{2}). There were 185,127 housing units at an average density of 982.3 per square mile (379.3/km^{2}).

During the day, incoming commuters increase Tulsa's population by nearly 36,000 people. This makes the city's daytime population rise from about 391,000 to over 427,000.

According to the 2010 census, Tulsa had a population of 391,906 and the racial and ethnic composition was as follows:

- White American: 62.6% (57.9% Non-Hispanic Whites)
- African American: 15.6%
- Native American: 5.3%
- Asian American: 2.3% (0.5% Indian, 0.4% Vietnamese, 0.3% Chinese, 0.2% Hmong, 0.2% Korean, 0.2% Burmese)
- Native Hawaiian and Other Pacific Islander: 0.1%
- Some other race: 8.0%
- Two or more races: 5.9%
- Hispanic or Latino (of any race): 14.1% (11.5% Mexican, 0.4% Puerto Rican, 0.3% Guatemalan, 0.2% Spanish, 0.2% Honduran, 0.2% Salvadoran)

Amongst Tulsa's white population, 14.0% were of German, 13.6% British (9.1% English, 2.6% Scottish, 1.2% Scotch-Irish, 0.7% Welsh), 11.2% Irish, 3.0% French, 1.8% Scandinavian (0.8% Norwegian, 0.7% Swedish, 0.3% Danish), and 1.7% Italian ancestries according to American Community Survey 2011.

According to the 2011 American Community Survey, approximately 85.7% of residents over the age of five spoke only English at home. While Spanish was spoken by 11.0% of the population, people who spoke other Indo-European languages made up 1.0% of the population, and people who spoke Asian languages other than Indo-European languages at home made up 1.9% of the population. People who spoke other languages made up 0.4% of the population.

In 2010, there were a total of 163,975 households in Tulsa. Of these, 58.1% were family households and 41.9% were non family households. A total of 27% of households had children under 18 years, and 10% had someone over the age of 65. The average household size was 2.34, while the average family size was 3.04. Of all households, 34.5% are made up of only one person. In the city proper, the age distribution was 24.8% of the population under the age of 18, 10.9% from 18 to 24, 29.9% from 25 to 44, 21.5% from 45 to 64, and 12.9% who were 65 years of age or older, while the median age was 34 years.

== Income and housing ==
The median income for a household in the city was $40,268 and the median income for a family was $51,977. The per capita income for the city was $26,727. 19.4% of the population and 15.1% of families were below the poverty line as were 30.6% were under the age of 18 and 9.6% are 65 or older. Of the city's population over the age of 25, 29.8% holds a bachelor's degree or higher, and 86.5% have a high school diploma or equivalent. In 2010, the median house price was $190,706 in 2012. The city is also ranked as being the best housing market for real estate investors.

== See also ==
- Tulsa metropolitan area
- Green Country
