= Demographics of Aurangabad City =

Population growth
Year	Pop.	±%
1901	36,837	—
1911	34,902	−5.3%
1921	36,876	+5.7%
1931	36,870	−0.0%
1941	50,924	+38.1%
1951	66,636	+30.9%
1961	97,701	+46.6%
1971	165,253	+69.1%
1981	301,000	+82.1%
1991	592,000	+96.7%
2001	902,179	+52.4%
2006	1,414,918	+56.8%
Source:Census of India

Aurangabad is a city in the west Indian state of Maharashtra.

The city, including the cantonment area, had a population of 30,209 in 1880s, of whom Hindus were 59.1 per cent, Muslims were 39.2 percent, Christians were 1.1 percent, Parsis were 0.1 percent, and others were 0.5 percent. In the city, proper Brahmins were 7.1 percent and Muslims were 38.5 percent. The city area then was roughly two-and-half to three-and-half square miles. In 1971, the city had a population of 150,514, (excluding cantonment). The growth during the decade from 1961 to 1971 was 71.86 percent. The growth was highest in the state even higher than Greater Bombay (now Mumbai) which grew by 43.75 percent. Marathi and Urdu are the principal languages of the city. according to 2011 census Marathi speaking population is 94 percent while Urdu is 6 percent in the city
