= Demographics of Washington =

Demographics of Washington may refer to:

- Demographics of Washington (state)
- Demographics of Washington, D.C.
