= Demographics of Northern Norway =

== Statistics Norway demographic statistics ==
Historical population
Year	Pop.	±%
1769	59,576	—
1801	79,134	+32.8%
1855	132,245	+67.1%
1900	259,315	+96.1%
1950	339,218	+30.8%
2000	464,328	+36.9%
2010?	464,665	+0.1%
2020?	475,701	+2.4%
2030?	489,019	+2.8%
Source: Statistics Norway .

The following demographic statistics are from the Statistics Norway, unless otherwise indicated.

=== Age and sex distribution ===
==== Age structure ====
===== Norway =====
(2005 est.)
0–14 years: 19.7% (male 466,243; female 443,075)
15–64 years: 65.6% (male 1,234,384; female 1,486,887)
65 years and over: 14.7% (male 285,389; female 392,331)

===== Northern Norway =====
(2009 est.)
0–14 years: 18.9% (male 44,848; female 42,315)
15–64 years: 65.5% (male 156,476; female 147,465)
65 years and over: 15.6% (male 32,017; female 40,304)

==== Population ====
  - 464,328 (January 1, 2000)
  - 464,649 (July 1, 2009)
- Population growth
  - 321 (0.06%)

==== Population - comparative ====
slightly larger than Malta, but slightly smaller than Luxembourg.

==== Population growth rate ====
0.29% (in 2008)

==== Population growth rate - comparative ====
slightly larger than United Kingdom, but slightly smaller than Denmark.

==== Total fertility rate ====
1.98 children born/woman (2007)

==== Literacy ====
definition: age 15 and over can read and write
total population: 100%
male: NA%
female: NA%
