= Demographics of Andhra Pradesh =

Demographics of a region in India

Andhra Pradesh is a state in southern India. There are a total of 26 districts in Andhra Pradesh, which compose the three regions of Coastal Andhra, Uttarandhra and Rayalaseema. The capital of the state is Amaravati.

The census over the years has grown steadily in terms of population. It borders the states of Tamil Nadu, Orissa, Telangana and Karnataka. Based on the Census of India (2011), the state has a population of 49,471,555 residents. The sex ratio is way above the national average at 992 as against 978 in 2001.

Spread over an area of 160,205 km^{2}, the state has a population density of 308 as against 277 in 2001 Census, which is below the national average. Registered growth rate of the population is 11.10 as against 14.59 recorded in the 2001 census. The decadal growth rate has come down by 3.49 during the 2001-2011.

Andhra Pradesh's literacy rate in 2011 was 67.77% as against 60.47% recorded in 2001 census, an increase of 7.19%. The official language of the state is Telugu.

== Religion ==
Religion in Andhra Pradesh
Religion	2001 (United Andhra Pradesh)		2011 (Andhra Pradesh)	
Religion	Population	(%)	Population	(%)
Hinduism	67,836,652	89.01	44,875,698	88.46
Islam	6,986,856	9.17	3,617,713	9.55
Christianity	1,181,917	1.55	682,660	1.34
Jainism	41,846	0.05	27,159	0.06
Sikhism	30,998	0.04	9,904	0.05
Buddhism	32,037	0.04	4,139	0.04
Other	4,768	0.01	4,125	0.01
Not stated	n/a	n/a	165,401	0.48
Total	76,210,007	100%	49,386,799	100%

== Language ==
Languages spoken by district (Note: Based on data in district article, which itself is derived from the 2011 census data at mandal level) Telugu 70-80% 80-90% 90–100%
