= Demographics of Lima =

Demographics of Lima, Peru

The demographics of Lima can be reconstructed through the population censuses carried out throughout its history. The government statistics department estimates that a third of Peru's population lives in Lima.

== Population by year ==
Historical population

Year	Pop.	±%
1536	250	—
1614	26,400	+10460.0%
1791	56,600	+114.4%
1812	63,900	+12.9%
1820	64,000	+0.2%
1827	60,000	−6.2%
1839	55,100	−8.2%
1850	80,000	+45.2%
1861	100,000	+25.0%
1877	101,500	+1.5%

Year	Pop.	±%
1890	103,900	+2.4%
1896	113,000	+8.8%
1900	103,900	−8.1%
1908	154,617	+48.8%
1920	203,381	+31.5%
1925	260,000	+27.8%
1927	200,000	−23.1%
1931	373,900	+86.9%
1940	533,600	+42.7%
1945	657,800	+23.3%

Year	Pop.	±%
1951	835,000	+26.9%
1953	964,000	+15.4%
1961	1,262,100	+30.9%
1969	2,541,300	+101.4%
1981	3,573,227	+40.6%
1993	5,363,270	+50.1%
1997	5,930,318	+10.6%
2000	6,271,430	+5.8%
2007	7,819,436	+24.7%

== Ethnic groups ==
- Mestizos: 69.9%
- Quechua: 16.8%
- European: 7.4%
- Afro-Peruvian: 2.8%
- Aymara: 0.7%
- Asian or other: 2.3%

== Evolution of the Lima Metropolitan Area ==
Evolution of the Lima Metropolitan Area

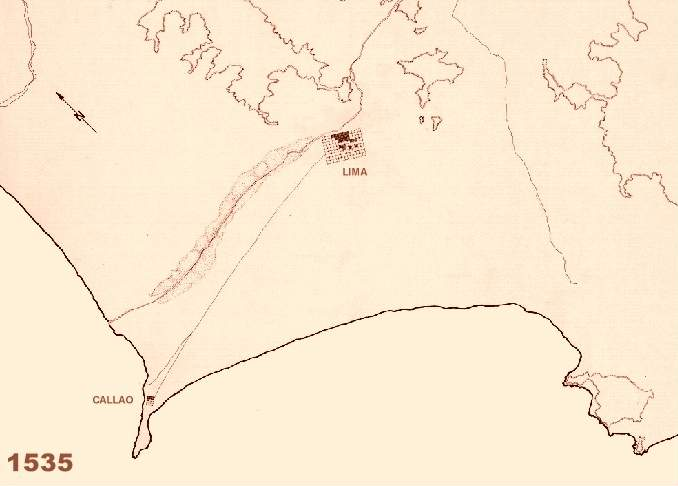
1535

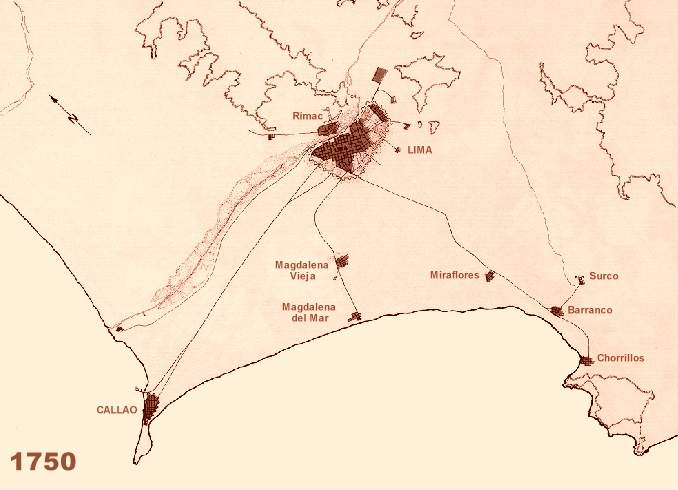
1750

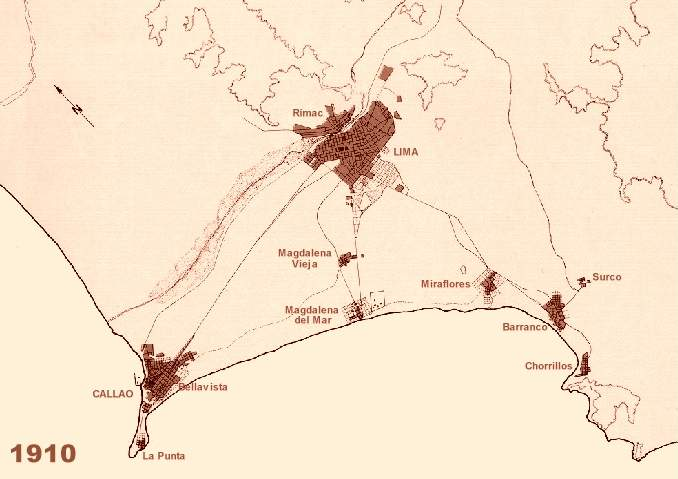
1910

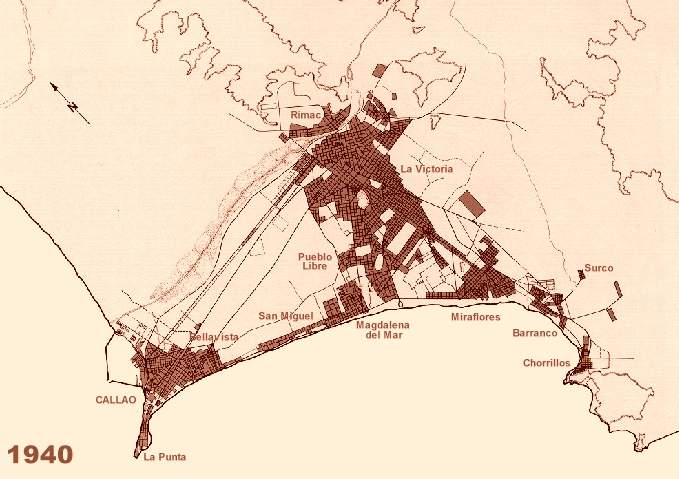
1940

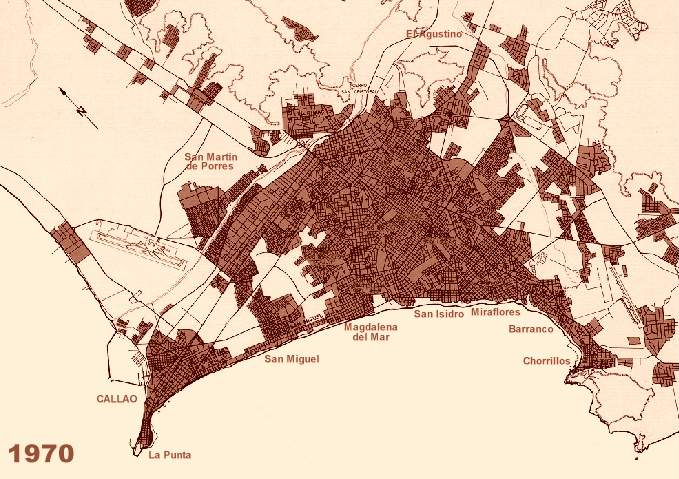
1970

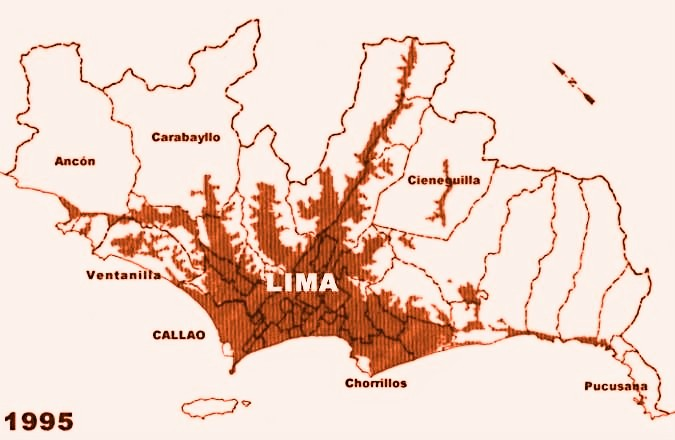
1995
