= Demographics of Visoko =

Population of Visoko municipality
year of census	1991.	1981.	1971.
ethnic Muslims	34,373 (74,46%)	28,838 (70,50%)	25,683 (72,34%)
Serbs	7,471 (16,18%)	6,831 (16,70%)	7,166 (20,18%)
Croats	1,872 (4,05%)	1,879 (4,59%)	1,914 (5,39%)
Yugoslavs	1,464 (3,17%)	2,783 (6,80%)	392 (1,10%)
others and unknown	980 (2,12%)	570 (1,39%)	348 (0,98%)
total	46,160	40,901	35,503

Currently, town has a population an estimated at 17,000 residents, with municipality numbering 40,276 residents, of which there is 96% Bosniaks, 2% Serbs, 1% Croats and 1% other. With 173 residents per square kilometer it is one of densely populated area in Federation of Bosnia and Herzegovina.

== Ethnic structure by settlements, 1991. census ==
Absolute ethnic majority

ethnic Muslims
Serbs
Croats

Relative ethnic majority

Serbs
Croats

Ethnic structure of population of Visoko municipality, by settlements, 1991. census
settlement	total	Muslims	Serbs	Croats	Yugoslavs	others
Arnautovići	487	479	5	0	2	1
Bare	97	30	0	67	0	0
Bešići	14	14	0	0	0	0
Biskupići	250	23	212	4	10	1
Bradve	1,026	832	114	3	8	69
Brezovik	62	62	0	0	0	0
Buci	333	293	34	0	5	1
Bulčići	365	16	0	344	1	4
Buzić Mahala	1,163	1,118	26	11	0	8
Buzići	369	367	0	0	1	1
Čakalovići	86	86	0	0	0	0
Čekrčići	309	5	299	4	1	0
Čifluk	171	102	68	0	0	1
Ćatići	27	11	16	0	0	0
Dautovci	101	98	3	0	0	0
Dobrinje	546	157	161	166	37	25
Dobro	84	66	18	0	0	0
Dobro Selo	409	351	0	57	0	1
Dol	192	173	6	11	1	1
Dolipolje	259	37	216	0	6	0
Dolovi	280	196	0	49	10	25
Donja Vratnica	298	183	113	0	2	0
Donja Zimća	656	32	422	142	32	28
Donje Moštre	614	612	0	0	1	1
Dvor	295	235	59	0	0	1
Džindići	246	240	4	0	0	2
Ginje	457	455	0	0	1	1
Goduša	429	408	21	0	0	0
Gorani	134	28	100	4	0	2
Gornja Vratnica	546	542	0	0	4	0
Gornja Zimća	377	249	124	0	3	1
Gornje Moštre	653	447	137	40	16	13
Grad	275	182	73	12	0	8
Grajani	480	417	46	0	2	15
Grđevac	453	425	21	0	2	5
Hadžići	159	145	8	6	0	0
Hlapčevići	653	608	19	2	6	18
Jelašje	67	55	12	0	0	0
Kalići	404	391	10	1	0	2
Kalotići	122	8	109	0	5	0
Koložići	478	309	169	0	0	0
Kondžilo	41	0	22	14	5	0
Kopači	84	9	74	0	1	0
Kula Banjer	715	331	348	20	9	7
Liješevo	408	404	1	1	0	2
Lisovo	350	238	73	34	5	0
Loznik	439	438	0	0	0	1
Lužnica	111	34	77	0	0	0
Mali Trnovci	303	295	0	0	7	1
Malo Čajno	498	183	202	1	0	112
Maurovići	570	346	203	4	12	5
Mladoš	0	0	0	0	0	0
Muhašinovići	520	21	317	141	21	20
Mulići	507	436	65	0	6	0
Okolišće	271	271	0	0	0	0
Orašac	576	538	37	0	1	0
Ozrakovići	366	278	54	13	19	2
Paljike	154	145	8	0	1	0
Podvinjci	773	580	184	0	9	0
Podvinje	771	640	106	14	3	8
Poklečići	75	75	0	0	0	0
Poriječani	243	242	0	1	0	0
Radinovići	461	447	1	0	0	13
Rajčići	563	561	1	0	0	1
Ramadanovci	225	219	1	0	4	1
Ratkovci	113	61	52	0	0	0
Seoča	737	650	33	40	4	10
Smršnica	271	260	11	0	0	0
Srhinje	1,364	1,016	280	8	31	29
Stuparići	634	626	4	0	3	1
Svinjarevo	80	30	0	37	0	13
Šošnje	280	222	0	45	3	10
Taukčići	308	257	50	0	0	1
Topuzovo Polje	311	149	153	3	4	2
Tramošnjik	355	350	0	0	1	4
Tujlići	273	202	61	0	1	9
Tušnjići	555	377	123	33	13	9
Upovac	498	498	0	0	0	0
Uvorići	895	884	4	0	0	7
Veliko Čajno	644	607	31	0	6	0
Veruša	115	90	0	25	0	0
Vidovići	93	88	4	0	0	1
Vilenjak	157	93	56	2	3	3
Visoko	13,663	10,056	1,641	395	1,115	456
Vrela	367	47	305	8	2	5
Zagorice	169	0	52	103	13	1
Zagornica	396	265	109	7	4	11
Zbilje	432	327	103	0	2	0
total	46,160	34,373	7,471	1,872	1,464	980
