= Demographics of Peja =

Demography is the statistical of human population. It encompasses the study of the size, structure, and distribution of populations. Peja has a demographic that includes a composition of the all population, according to different categories.

== History ==
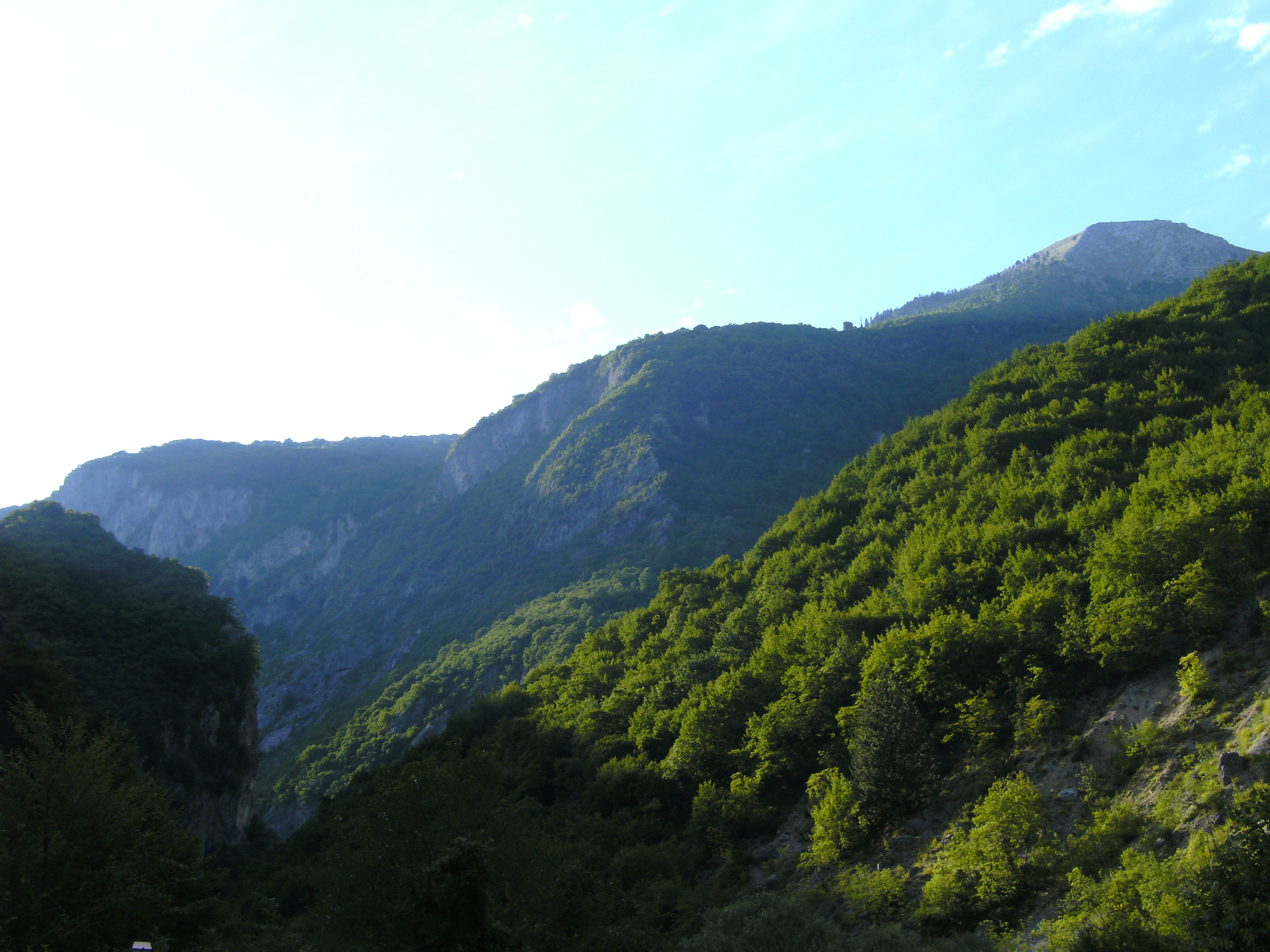
Rugova Canyon Kosovo

Peja is known as a city since the Illyrians time. Due to the recent wars, the Ottoman evasion at the beginning, then the last war with Serbia, brought Peja serious losses, in which case it was not possible to preserve all Illyrian features. In Illyrian times Peja was a major residential center. It lies in the north-western edge of the Metohija valley before the gorge of the scenic Rugova Mountain. Komuna e Pejes

== Population by type of settlement, sex and basic contingents ==
From the last recordings made in 2011, which included a population census and household registration, the majority of people were included. Peja has a population of approximately 96.450 people, where most of them live in the urban area 48.962, whereas 47.448 in the rural part.

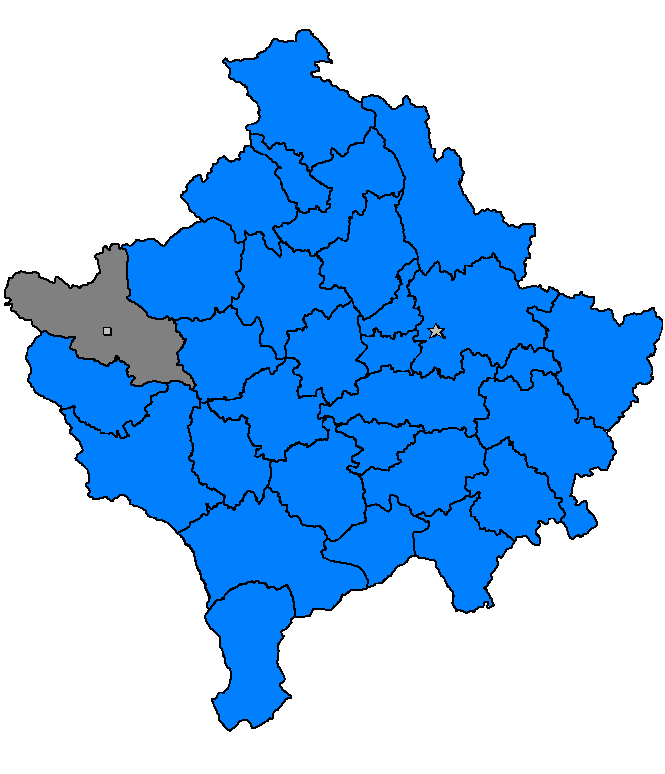
Peja 2006

== Male and female population ==
Part of demography which has to do with population, is associated with the part of the population which includes gender, male and female. Peja has a population which consists of 24.262 males living in the urban area, whereas 23.890 in the rural area. However, women who live in the urban area consist of 48.298, whereas in the rural area it is 23.598.

== Population by gender and ethnicity ==
In recordings made in 2011 in the town of Peja, data for gender and ethnic group were presented from the collection of citizens self declaration. Data about gender and ethnicity in censuses from the Statistical Agency of Kosovo are as follows: total female and men are 96.450, from which 48,152 consists of males and 48,298 females. While according to other data about ethnicity they consist of:

- Albanian 87,975, male 44,025, female 43,948
- Serbs 332, male 166, female 166.
- Turkish 59, male 30, female 29.
- Bosnian 3,786, male 1,808, female 1,978
- Roma 993, male 466, female 527
- Ashkali 143, male 71, female 72
- Egyptian 2,700, male 1,383, female 1,317
- Gorani 189, male 96, female, 93
- Others 132, male 38, female 94

=== Population by sex and religion ===
Religion data for Peja
Gender	Islamic	Orthodox	Catholic	Other	No religion	Total
Male	46,409	179	1,225	45	20	48,152
Female	46,505	186	1,282	48	28	48,544
Both Genders	92,914	365	2,507	93	48	94,450

=== Children born and infant mortality ===
Infant Mortality is the mortality rate of infants and children before they become five years old. Around the world ten million children and infants die before they reach the age of five. 99% of these deaths are from underdeveloped countries. The reasons for these deaths can be various, for example psychological, social. Also, there are many factors that contribute to infant mortality such as maternal education level, environmental conditions, political and medical infrastructure etc. There are three forms of mortality:

1. It is death which occurs 28 days after birth. Neonatal death is attributed the lack of care during pregnancy and after birth. It consists of 40-60 % of infant mortality in developing countries.
2. Mortality posteonatale is the death of the child 29 days after birth. The main causes of this disease are: malnutrition, infectious diseases etc.
3. Mortality Perinatal is the death of the newborns up to a week after birth.

Children born infant and mortality for Peja
Places	Children born after 2005	Infant mortality after 2005	Infant mortality in 1000 live births
Urban	3,944	50	13
Rural	3,714	22	6
Both places	7,658	72	9

==== Population by aged 10+ by completed education ====
Population by aged 10+ by completed education in Peja
Gender	No completed education	Primary/4class/5class	8class/9class	12class/13class	High school	Faculty bachelor	Graduate	Doctorate	Total
Male	2535	1522/3960	6566/4459	11745/4081	1559	3044	339	52	39962
Female	4426	3987/3701	10492/4191	7260/3225	1015	2162	156	9	40614
Both Genders	6951	5,509/7,661	17,058/8,750	19,005/7,306	2,574	5,206	495	61	80576

=== Population 10+ without completed education level by literacy ===
The data for reading and writing are collected for the people who are over ten years old and have not attended, formal education, as well as for those who have not completed any level of education.

1. Total:
- Knows how to read and write, total 4,115 male 1909, female, 2206
- Illiterate doesn't know how to read and write, total 2,836, male 626, female 2210
- Total male, 784, female 2511, both gender 3,295
1. 2 No formal education:
- Knows how to read and write, total 947, male 304, female 643
- Illiterate doesn't know how to read and write, total 2,348, male 480, female 1868
- Total male 1751, female 1905, both gender 3,656
1. 3 No completed education level:
- Knows how to read and write, total 3,168, male 1605, female 1563
- Illiterate doesn't know how to read and write, total 488, male 146, female 342
- Total male 2535, female 4416, both gender 6951

==== Population by sex and place of birth ====
Population by place of birth in Peja
Places	Kosovo	Same municipality and settlement	Same municipality with different settlement	Different municipality from the one of current usual residence	Not available	Abroad	Total
Urban	46617	41520	2428	2628	41	1535	48152
Rural	45869	32676	5833	7270	90	2429	48298
Both	92,486	74,196	8,261	9,898	131	3,964	96,450

==== Population by sex and citizenship ====
Citizenship is defined as a legal connection which has to do with an individual's relationship with his or her state. It is acquired by birth, naturalism, marriage or other means according to national Legislation.

Population by citizenship for Peja
Total	Kosovo	Serbia	Albania	Macedonia	Montenegro	Turkey	Germany	USA	Bosnia&Herzegovina	Croatia	Other country	Total
Urban	46617	55	74	2	61	3	10	8	1	1	698	48,152
Rural	45869	65	106	9	102	2	6	7	6	4	779	48,298
Both	92,486	120	180	11	163	5	16	15	7	5	1,477	96,450
