= Demographics of Eastern Norway =

== Statistics Norway demographic statistics ==
Historical population
Year	Pop.	±%
1769	329,041	—
1951	1,584,045	+381.4%
1960	1,733,346	+9.4%
1970	1,895,148	+9.3%
1980	1,982,131	+4.6%
1990	2,064,971	+4.2%
2000	2,207,164	+6.9%
2010	2,430,512	+10.1%
2020	2,708,720	+11.4%
2030	2,970,713	+9.7%
Source: Statistics Norway .

The following demographic statistics are from the Statistics Norway, unless otherwise indicated.

=== Age and sex distribution ===
==== Age structure ====
===== Norway =====
(2005 est.)
0–14 years: 19.7% (male 466,243; female 443,075)
15–64 years: 65.6% (male 1,234,384; female 1,486,887)
65 years and over: 14.7% (male 285,389; female 392,331)

===== Eastern Norway =====
(2009 est.)
0–14 years: 18.6% (male 226,334; female 214,775)
15–64 years: 64.5% (male 765,005; female 759,737)
65 years and over: 16.9% (male 150,656; female 201,963)

==== Population ====
  - 2,207,164 (January 1, 2000)
  - 2,410,630 (July 1, 2009)
- Population growth
  - 203,466 (8.44%)

==== Population - comparative ====
slightly larger than Latvia, but slightly smaller than Mongolia and Jamaica.

==== Population growth rate ====
1.59% (in 2008)

==== Population growth rate - comparative ====
slightly larger than India, but slightly smaller than Turkmenistan.

==== Total fertility rate ====
1.85 children born/woman (2007)

==== Literacy ====
definition: age 15 and over can read and write
total population: 100%
male: NA%
female: NA%
