= Demographics of Coventry =

- Population pyramid of Coventry
- Population: 316,960 (2011)

Population density in the 2011 census in Coventry

Coventry, England is an ethnically and culturally diverse city. It is the fifteenth most populous city in the United Kingdom.

Industry sectors of Coventry over time

== Population ==
Coventry's total population, according to the 2011 UK census, was 316,960. The population density was 3,408 people per square km.

== Ethnicity ==
Ethnic demography of Coventry over time

Ethnic makeup of Coventry by single year ages in 2021

The following table shows the ethnic group of respondents in the 1991, 2001, 2011 and 2021 censuses in Coventry.

A 1960 report estimated that the 'coloured' population of Coventry was between 3,000 and 5,000, with approximately 2,000 Indians, 1,500 Pakistanis, and 400 Afro-Caribbeans.

Ethnic Group	1971 estimations		1981 estimations		1991 census		2001 census		2011 census		2021 census	
Ethnic Group	Number	%	Number	%	Number	%	Number	%	Number	%	Number	%
White: Total	310,281	94%	292,411	90.9%	268,853	88%	252,643	83.98%	234,029	73.84%	226,246	65.5%
White: British	–	–	–	–	–	–	235,632	78.32%	211,188	66.63%	190,889	55.3%
White: Irish	–	–	–	–	13,540	4.59%	10,401	3.46%	7,305	2.30%	5,662	1.6%
White: Gypsy or Irish Traveller (Note: New category created for the 2011 census)	–	–	–	–	–	–	–	–	151	0.05%	294	0.1%
White: Roma	–	–	–	–	–	–	–	–	–	–	1,116	0.3%
White: Other	–	–	–	–	–	–	6,610	2.20%	15,385	4.85%	28,285	8.2%
Asian or Asian British: Total	–	–	23,576	7.3%	30,010	9.8%	36,093	12.00%	51,598	16.28%	63,915	18.5%
Asian or Asian British: Indian	–	–	18,489	5.7%	22,825	7.5%	24,177	8.04%	27,751	8.76%	32,096	9.3%
Asian or Asian British: Pakistani	–	–	3,034	0.9%	4,080		6,169	2.05%	9,510	3.00%	12,658	3.7%
Asian or Asian British: Bangladeshi	–	–	757		1,271		1,741	0.58%	2,951	0.93%	4,257	1.2%
Asian or Asian British: Chinese (Note: In 2001, listed under the 'Chinese or other ethnic group' heading.)	–	–	538		806		2,183	0.73%	3,728	1.18%	4,571	1.3%
Asian or Asian British: Other Asian	–	–	758		1,028		1,823	0.61%	7,658	2.42%	10,333	3.0%
Black or Black British: Total	–	–	4,310	1.4%	5,060	1.7%	5,412	1.80%	17,764	5.60%	36,744	11.5%
Black or Black British: African	–	–	347	0.1%	423		1,679	0.56%	12,836	4.05%	24,109	7.0%
Black or Black British: Caribbean	–	–	3,021		3,457		3,314	1.10%	3,317	1.05%	9,459	3.5%
Black or Black British: Other Black	–	–	942		1,180		419	0.14%	1,611	0.51%	3,155	0.9%
Mixed: Total	–	–	–	–	–	–	5,163	1.72%	8,230	2.60%	11,731	3.4%
Mixed: White and Black Caribbean	–	–	–	–	–	–	2,453	0.82%	3,672	1.16%	4,597	1.3%
Mixed: White and Black African	–	–	–	–	–	–	271	0.09%	943	0.30%	1,663	0.5%
Mixed: White and Asian	–	–	–	–	–	–	1,605	0.53%	2,388	0.75%	3,182	0.9%
Mixed: Other Mixed	–	–	–	–	–	–	834	0.28%	1,227	0.39%	2,289	0.7%
Other: Total	–	–	1,345		1,676		1,537	0.51%	5,339	1.68%	12,706	3.7%
Other: Arab (Note: New category created for the 2011 census)	–	–	–	–	–	–	–	–	2,020	0.64%	2,482	0.7%
Other: Any other ethnic group	–	–	–	–	–	–	1,537	0.51%	3,319	1.05%	10,224	3.0%
Ethnic minority: Total	19,968	6%	29,231	9.1%	36,746	12%	48,205	16%	82,931	26.2%	119,075	34.5%
Total	330,249	100%	321,642	100%	305,599	100%	300,848	100%	316,960	100%	345,321	100%

Notes for table above

Distribution of ethnic groups in Coventry according to the 2011 census.
White

White-British

White-Irish

White-Other

Asian

Asian-Indian

Asian-Pakistani

Asian-Bangladeshi

Asian-Chinese

Black

Black-African

Black-Caribbean

Other-Arab

Ethnicity of school pupils

Ethnic group	School year			
Ethnic group	1971		2021/2022	
Ethnic group	Number	%	Number	%
White: Total	–	93%	31,770	54.3
White: British	–	–	25,797	44.1
White: Irish	–	–	167	0.3
White: Traveller of Irish heritage	–	–	44	0.1
White: Gypsy/Roma	–	–	540	0.9
White: Other	–	–	5,222	8.9
Asian / Asian British: Total	–	–	12,780	22
Asian / Asian British: Indian	–	–	5,217	8.9
Asian / Asian British: Pakistani	–	–	3,072	5.3
Asian / Asian British: Bangladeshi	–	–	1,027	1.8
Asian / Asian British: Chinese	–	–	264	0.5
Asian / Asian British: Other Asians	–	–	3,200	5.5
Black / Black British: Total	–	–	7,733	13.2
Black: Caribbean	–	–	340	0.6
Black: African	–	–	6,683	11.4
Black: Other Blacks	–	–	710	1.2
Mixed / British Mixed	–	–	4,330	7.4
Other: Total	–	–	1,257	2.1
Unclassified	–	–	626	1.1
Non-White: Total	–	7%		45.7%
Total:	–		58,496	100%

== Languages ==
The most common main languages spoken in Coventry according to the 2011 census are shown below.

Rank	Language	Usual residents aged 3+	Proportion
1	English	261,117	86.14%
2	Punjabi	6,849	2.26%
3	Polish	6,161	2.03%
4	Gujarati	2,523	0.83%
5	Urdu	2,479	0.82%
6	Arabic	1,821	0.60%
7	Tamil	1,445	0.48%
8	Bengali (with Sylheti and Chatgaya)	1,391	0.46%
9	French	1,340	0.44%
10	Persian	925	0.31%
11	Kurdish	895	0.30%
12	Romanian	883	0.29%
13	Hindi	784	0.26%
14	Somali	746	0.25%
15	Latvian	674	0.22%
16	Russian	597	0.20%
17	Swahili/Kiswahili	572	0.19%
18	Shona	521	0.17%
19	Slovak	497	0.16%
20	Malayalam	465	0.15%
	Other	10,445	3.45%

== Country of birth ==
UK and foreign born population pyramid of Coventry in 2021. Males and females representing the UK born population while foreign males and females representing the foreign born population.

Coventry's population is 27.9% foreign born as of 2021.

Country of birth	Year	
Country of birth	2021	
Country of birth	Number	%
United Kingdom	248,990	72.1%
Foreign born	96,333	27.9%
Total	345,323	100%

This table list major place of birth for Coventry according to 2021 census:

#	Place	Number
1	England	242,103
2	India	15,610
3	Poland	8,855
4	Romania	8,355
5	Pakistan	5,013
6	Ireland	3,865
7	Nigeria	3,720
8	Scotland	3,352
9	China	2,631
10	Ghana	2,258
11	Italy	2,254
12	Wales	2,177
13	Sri Lanka	2,099
14	Zimbabwe	1,938
15	Kenya	1,797
16	Bangladesh	1,733
17	Latvia	1,519
18	Afghanistan	1,477
19	Northern Ireland	1,319
20	Somalia	1,236

== Religion ==
Religious make up of Coventry by single year age groups in 2021

The following table shows the religion of respondents in the 2001 and 2011 censuses in Coventry.

Religion	2001		2011		2021	
Religion	Number	%	Number	%	Number	%
Christian	196,346	65.26%	170,090	53.66%	151,577	43.9%
Buddhist	784	0.26%	1,067	0.34%	1,257	0.4%
Hindu	7,757	2.58%	11,152	3.52%	13,724	4.0%
Jewish	222	0.07%	210	0.07%	259	0.1%
Muslim	11,686	3.88%	23,665	7.47%	35,800	10.4%
Sikh	13,960	4.64%	15,912	5.02%	17,297	5.0%
Other religion	733	0.24%	1,641	0.52%	1,908	0.6%
No religion	45,314	15.06%	72,896	23.00%	102,338	29.6%
Religion not stated	24,046	7.99%	20,327	6.41%	21,166	6.1%
Total	300,848	100.00%	316,960	100.00%	345,326	100%

Distribution of religions in Coventry according to the 2011 census.
Christianity

Islam

Judaism

Hinduism

Sikhism

Buddhism

Other religion

No religion

== See also ==
- Demographics of the West Midlands County
- Demographics of England
- Demographics of the United Kingdom
