= Demographics of Trøndelag =

== Statistics Norway demographic statistics ==
Historical population
Year	Pop.	±%
1769	78,274	—
1801	103,402	+32.1%
1855	170,341	+64.7%
1900	219,285	+28.7%
1950	308,128	+40.5%
2000	389,960	+26.6%
2010?	422,059	+8.2%
2020?	462,432	+9.6%
2030?	501,147	+8.4%
Source: Statistics Norway .

The following demographic statistics are from the Statistics Norway, unless otherwise indicated.

=== Age and sex distribution ===
==== Age structure ====
===== Norway =====
(2005 est.)
0–14 years: 19.7% (male 466,243; female 443,075)
15–64 years: 65.6% (male 1,234,384; female 1,486,887)
65 years and over: 14.7% (male 285,389; female 392,331)

===== Trøndelag =====
(2009 est.)
0–14 years: 19.1% (male 40,746; female 38,777)
15–64 years: 65.7% (male 141,227; female 130,014)
65 years and over: 15.0% (male 27,436; female 35,004)

==== Population ====
  - 389,960 (1 January 2000)
  - 418,453 (1 July 2009)
- Population growth
  - 28,493 (7.3%)

==== Population - comparative ====
slightly larger than Malta, but slightly smaller than Luxembourg.

==== Population growth rate ====
1.10% (in 2008)

==== Population growth rate - comparative ====
slightly larger than Argentina, but slightly smaller than Ireland.

==== Total fertility rate ====
1.90 children born/woman (2007)

==== Literacy ====
definition: age 15 and over can read and write
total population: 100%
male: NA%
female: NA%
