= Demographics of Ferizaj =

Feriz Khan or Hani i Ferizit, is known as the first place where the first inhabitants in the region Ferizaj, a city and municipality in Kosovo originated.

== The first families to come to Ferizaj ==
=== Goga Families ===
The city of Ferizaj was established in 1873. However, many decades before the creation of the city, Ferizaj was settled by the first family named Goga. Their houses were built in the village of Nikadin, which, before the construction of the railway, was unnamed. This family also lived in the region of Ferizaj when Elezit Khan existed. They began to work and to establish their households. Near their houses was a crossroad that linked all the roads of Kosovo. They became the most important family of that time. Members of this family are considered the first inhabitants and the creators of the city. It is thought that the Goga family originated from the area of northern Albania from the great highland in the village of Muraj. In those areas, the surname Goga is very common. Many families around the beginning of the 18th century moved to Kosovo to take advantage better living conditions. Members of Goga family brought their culture with them to Ferizaj. Their unique and rich spoken language originated in northern Albania. The chamber of Ismajl Goga is famous for its hospitality for friends, guests, and passersby. Some of the first leaders of the Goga family were: Bislim Goga II, Haxhi Kadri Goga III, and Ismajl Goga and his descendants Muharremi, Faiku, Samiu, Kadriu, Remziu, and Xhylizarja.

=== Vata Families ===
Early residents of Ferizaj city also included the Vata family. Families lived quietly in the same place until the year 1912. Today a military barrack occupies the land. The Vata family mostly worked in agriculture and cultivated vegetables. The first leaders of Vata family were: Ali Vata, Avdi Vata, Bajram Vata, Beqir Vata, Fejzë Vata, Haki Vata, Halim Vata, Hetem Vata, Halim Vata, Ismajl Vata, Liman Vata, Mustafë Vata, Muharrem Vata, Nazif Vata, Rizah Vata, Rifat Vata, Sylejman Vata, Shaban Vata, preacher, professor, teacher and one of the creators of the first Albanian school, called Ismajl Qemaili in Ferizaj (1914–1968).

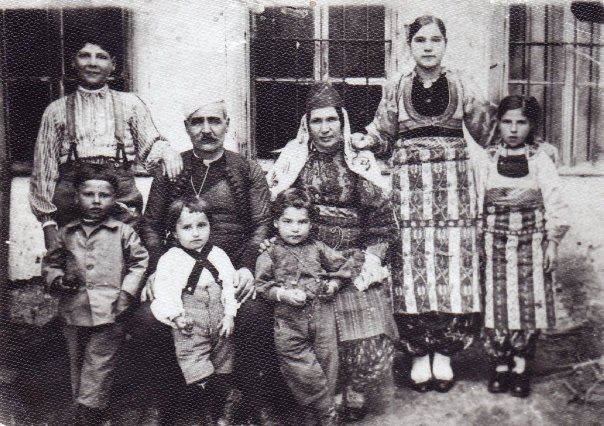
Familja Kurti, Ferizaj 1920

=== Kurti Families ===
Other early residents of Ferizaj city were the Kurti Family. Around 1750, Kolë Kurti and his brothers (Seba, Andrea, and Toni) moved to Gjakova. Later Zef Kurti married Petra and moved to Ferizaj in 1878 during the time the railway was under construction. They were mainly tradesmen and hand-craftsmen. One of the Kurtis was Father Shtjefën Kurti (1898–1971) who was a priest and a martyr. He was born and raised in Ferizaj and studied in Graz, Feldkirch, and Innsbruck in Austria as well as Rome, Italy. From 1936 he was the parish priest in Tirana where he was executed by the communist regime of that time.

Gjon Serreqi is another member of the Kurti family who was the leader of Lidhja Nacionale Demoratike Shqipëtare (the Albanian National Democratic Union or LNDSH). Gjon Serreqi was a professor who was jailed for his political activity and sentenced to death by the regime of that time. Today, one of Europe's largest secondary schools bears his name in his honor.

The Kurti family brought the first pharmacist to Ferizaj, Anton Kurti, the father of Vilson and Marsel Kurti as well as the tradesman and a leader in the metal industry Leon Kurti, who is the father of Kolë and Franc Kurti, both mechanical engineers and gold tradesmen who to this day, reside in Ferizaj.

In recent generations, the Kurti family has continued to make significant contributions in various professional fields:

- Leonard Kurti, a Ph.D. in Biochemistry and Assistant Professor at the University of Prishtina.
- Ilir Kurti, holding an MBA and PMP certification, is a well-known entrepreneur with activities in both Kosovo, USA and Germany.
- Dr. David Kurti, a Medical Doctor specialized in Radio-Oncology, based in Lucerne, Switzerland and a former doctor of the Juventus

The Kurti family is a large family whose members also live in: Albania (Tirana, Durrës), Croatia (Rijeka, Opatija), Switzerland (Lucerne), Germany (Stuttgart) and Norway (Oslo).

=== Albanian Catholic families ===
Ferizaj became a very attractive place for those seeking new opportunities for work and it was an environment where there were no national or religious separations. Because of that, it also became attractive for Catholic families that had settle in the village since the beginning. Most of the Catholic families were involved with handcrafts. They had different experiences from visiting the most well-known handcrafts, economic, and cultural centers. The leaders of those families were: Anton Kurti, pharmacist, the father of Vilson and Marse Kurti; merchant: Leon Kurti the father of Kolë and Franc Kurti both of them mechanical engineers, and Violeta Kurti-Pufjes, education veteran; Anton Gjoni, baker and painter; Batë Kajtazi, officer, the father of Marsel and Viktor; Dedë Gjini; Dedë Pren Palaj, baker, Ded's father, teacher; Dedush Ndou, worker; Franc Dedushi, shopkeeper, Gap Gllasniqi, Merchant, Kolë Gllasniqi's father, doctor of professional orientation; Gjon Serreqi, professor, jailed for his politics and sentenced to death as a leader of Albanian National Democratic Organization for national activities.

=== Refugee families ===
Along with the violent displacements of Albanians from Serbia (Sandžak or Niš) after the Berlin Congress in 1878, a large number of people were placed in Ferizaj. They were known as Muhaxhirs. The most well-known family leaders were Abdullah Musliu-Petrovic who was the Head of Ferizaj in 1946, Ahmet Qunglla, Ahmet Svarqa, Avdyl Rexhepi, Avdyl Qerimi, Emin Islami, Fetah Hasani, Hajdin Petrovci, etc.

=== Gorani families ===
This family came to Ferizaj from villages around Dragash, which were known for their professionals which included handcrafts, cooks, and confectionery makers. Heads of Gorani families were: Adem Limani, Beqir Mehmeti, Berzat Osmani, Daut Sadiku, Ejup Limani, Elez Rexhepi, etc.

=== Serbian and Montenegrin families ===
A big number of Serbians came to Ferizaj including merchants and craftsmen. They came from different parts of Kosovo. Serbians and Montenegrins arrived between the two World Wars and settled in all of Serbias areas. The first family heads were: Duša Llukič, Marko Gjorgje Nikolič, Sava Vitković, etc.

== Residents and households in Ferizaj ==
The following table lists the number of residents and households economies in Ferizaj for the years 1961, 1971, 1981, and 1999. The historical population for the current area of Ferizaj is divided into statistical areas as follows:

No.	Residence	Number of residents				Number of household economies		
No.	Residence	1961	1971	1981	1999	1961	1971	1981
1	Ferizaj	11655	22239	37655	57421	2354	4083	6179
2	Bablak	361	370	388	455	63	68	75
3	Babush	395	369	341	289	69	68	72
4	Balaj	551	687	933	1551	78	103	150
5	Bibaj	341	443	592	914	67	71	92
6	Burrnik	442	450	398	633	64	58	46
7	Cërrnillë	546	668	817	1353	87	99	119
8	Doganaj	386	463	582	900	54	72	96
9	Dremjak	612	763	936	1557	100	110	130
10	Dardani	758	720	849	931	148	141	154
11	Gaçkë	1081	1268	1723	2726	187	203	226
12	Gërlicë	181	260	–	347	34	42	–
13	Greme	1966	2576	3520	5749	284	355	418
14	Jezerc	1630	1666	1621	2692	236	231	183
15	Komogllavë	1851	2499	3118	5164	276	333	183
16	Koshare	925	1203	1543	2547	135	179	185
17	Kosinë	536	605	731	1121	85	90	95
18	Lloshkobare	668	920	1170	1910	100	141	148
19	Mirash	1083	1231	1542	2431	145	182	208
20	Muhovc	324	337	444	730	48	48	46
21	Manastir	364	580	779	1295	52	81	106
22	Mirosalë	792	909	1037	1712	107	115	130
23	Nikadin	622	862	1026	1080	111	150	137
24	Neredime e Epërme	1219	1267	1641	2255	236	239	297
25	Neredime e Poshtme	750	945	1302	1943	121	149	207
26	Papaz	315	336	397	655	50	42	66
27	Pleshinë	1416	2035	2877	5177	232	298	424
28	Pojatë	407	595	720	1156	70	76	88
29	Prelez i Jerlive	941	1046	1242	2008	143	177	175
30	Prelez i Muhaxherëve	446	576	685	859	71	72	52
31	Rahovicë	877	576	685	859	101	119	108
32	Rakaj	164	302	583	959	34	38	57
33	Sazli	582	597	716	1136	86	84	91
34	Slivovë	633	806	1138	1859	107	120	143
35	Softaj	279	354	366	540	53	50	59
36	Sojevë	729	906	1155	1907	122	126	177
37	Surrqinë	230	312	386	644	37	38	47
38	Fshati i Vjetër	250	393	679	1037	50	62	99
39	Talinovc i Jerlive	387	505	727	665	61	57	79
40	Talinovc i Muhaxherëve	653	878	1133	1386	110	143	122
41	Tërrn	625	716	799	1273	88	93	102
42	Varosh	1257	1541	2035	3200	216	229	267
43	Zaskok	886	1070	1281	1924	147	170	188
44	Zllatar	685	856	1084	1801	98	109	122
