= Demographics of Oslo =

- Population pyramid of the Oslo county in 2022
- Population: 702,543 (2022)

Oslo's population from 1801 to 2006

The population of Oslo is monitored by Statistics Norway. As of 2022, the population of Oslo sat at 702,543.

== Population ==
As of 2022, the population of Oslo sat at 702,543.

== Origin ==
Population Group	Year											
Population Group	1970		1980		1990		2000		2010		2020	
Population Group	Number	%	Number	%	Number	%	Number	%	Number	%	Number	%
Norwegians	469,175	96.2%	424,756	93.4%	399,878	87.3	408,298	80.4%	420,469	71.7%	451,534	65.1%
Norwegian born in Norway	458,084	94.0%	409,804	90.1%	379,346	82.8%	377,653	74.4%	374,421	63.8%	389,130	56.1%
Foreign born to Norwegian born parents	2,129	0.4%	2,585	0.6%	3,054	0.7%	3,507	0.7%	6,241	1.1%	7,221	1.0%
Norwegian born with one foreign-born parent	8,962	1.8%	12,367	2.7%	17,478	3.8%	27,138	5.3%	39,807	6.8%	55,183	8.0%
Total: Immigrants	18,188	3.8%	30,116	6.6%	58,486	12.8%	99,169	19.5%	166,391	28.4%	241,960	34.9%
Immigrants	15,981	3.3%	25,278	5.6%	47,063	10.3%	73,777	14.5%	122,379	20.9%	177,455	25.6%
Norwegian born to immigrant parents	492	0.1%	2,395	0.5%	8,164	1.8%	20,963	4.1%	38,110	6.5%	56,899	8.2%
Foreign born with one Norwegian parent	1,715	0.4%	2,443	0.5%	3,259	0.7%	4,429	0.9%	5,902	1.0%	7,606	1.1%
Total	487,363	100%	454,872	100%	458,364	100%	507,467	100%	586,860	100%	693,494	100%

Immigrants and Norwegian-born to immigrant parents, by country background for Oslo, 2023

	Persons
2023
0301 Oslo municipality
Immigrants and Norwegian-born to immigrant parents	
Total	243 932
Nordic countries except Norway, EU/EFTA, UK, USA, Canada, Australia, New Zealand	72 492
Europe except EU/EFTA/UK, Africa, Asia, America except USA and Canada, Oceania except Australia and New Zealand, polar regions	171 440
Immigrants	
Total	184 251
Nordic countries except Norway, EU/EFTA, UK, USA, Canada, Australia, New Zealand	64 932
Europe except EU/EFTA/UK, Africa, Asia, America except USA and Canada, Oceania except Australia and New Zealand, polar regions	119 319
Norwegian-born to immigrant parents	
Total	59 681
Nordic countries except Norway, EU/EFTA, UK, USA, Canada, Australia, New Zealand	7 560
Europe except EU/EFTA/UK, Africa, Asia, America except USA and Canada, Oceania except Australia and New Zealand, polar regions	52 121

As of 2022, immigrants of non-Western origin and their children enumerated 164,824, and made up an estimated 24% of Oslo's population.

Immigrants of Western origin and their children enumerated 71,858, and made up an estimated 10% of the city's population. Immigrants made up a total of 35% of Oslo's population in 2022.

Historical population

Year	Pop.	±%
1500	2,500	—
1801	8,931	+257.2%
1855	31,715	+255.1%
1890	151,239	+376.9%
1951	434,365	+187.2%
1961	475,663	+9.5%
1971	481,548	+1.2%

Year	Pop.	±%
1981	452,023	−6.1%
1991	461,644	+2.1%
2001	508,726	+10.2%
2011	599,230	+17.8%
2017	672,061	+12.2%
2022	707,531	+5.3%

Source: Statistics Norway

== Number of immigrants ==
The current number of immigrants by country living in Oslo, Norway, as of 1 January 2020 are as follows;

Nationality	Population (2021)
Pakistan	22,629
Somalia	16,838
Poland	16,160
Sweden	11,694
Iraq	8,307
India	7,188
Morocco	7,033
Sri Lanka	6,686
Iran	6,685
Philippines	6,585

== Religion ==
Religion in Oslo (1.1.2019)
religion	percent
Church of Norway	48.7%
Other Christian denominations	8.4%
Islam	9.5%
Buddhism	0.6%
Other religions	1.1%
Life stance communities	2.8%
Unaffiliated	28.9%

Religiously, the residents of Oslo are in a majority-minority state with the largest group religious group being adherents to the Lutheran Church of Norway, but these do not make up the majority of residents. Irreligious people make up 28.9% of the population with the largest other religious group being Islam which makes up 9.5% of the city.

== See also ==
- Norwegian immigrant statistics
