= Demographics of Southern Norway =

== Statistics Norway demographic statistics ==
Historical population
Year	Pop.	±%
1769	63,976	—
1801	76,055	+18.9%
1855	126,475	+66.3%
1900	161,494	+27.7%
1950	172,710	+6.9%
1960	185,302	+7.3%
1970	203,226	+9.7%
1980	225,429	+10.9%
1990	240,906	+6.9%
2000	257,869	+7.0%
2010?	279,024	+8.2%
2020?	308,220	+10.5%
2030?	337,339	+9.4%
Source: Statistics Norway .

The following demographic statistics are from the Statistics Norway, unless otherwise indicated.

=== Age and sex distribution ===
==== Age structure ====
===== Norway =====
(2005 est.)
0–14 years: 19.7% (male 466,243; female 443,075)
15–64 years: 65.6% (male 1,234,384; female 1,486,887)
65 years and over: 14.7% (male 285,389; female 392,331)

===== Southern Norway =====
(2009 est.)
0–14 years: 19.8% (male 27,734; female 26,836)
15–64 years: 66.1% (male 92,364; female 89,516)
65 years and over: 14.1% (male 17,311; female 22,831)

==== Population ====
  - 257,869 (January 1, 2000)
  - 277,250 (July 1, 2009)
- Population growth
  - 19,381 (7.5%)

==== Population - comparative ====
slightly larger than Vanuatu and Barbados, but slightly smaller than Iceland and Maldives.

==== Population growth rate ====
1.31% (in 2008)

==== Population growth rate - comparative ====
slightly larger than Brazil, but slightly smaller than Oregon.

==== Total fertility rate ====
1.96 children born/woman (2007)

==== Literacy ====
definition: age 15 and over can read and write
total population: 100%
male: NA%
female: NA%
