= Demographic history of Vojvodina =

Demographic history of Vojvodina reflects its rich history and its former location at the border of the Ottoman and Habsburg empires and at the confluence of various peoples, making it a hotbed of invasion, colonization, and assimilation processes.

== Historical preview ==
The area of present-day Vojvodina had been inhabited since the Paleolithic period. Indo-European peoples moved into this area during three migration waves, which are dated in 4200 BC, 3300 BC, and 2800 BC, respectively. Before the Roman conquest in the 1st century BC, Indo-European peoples of Illyrian, Thracian, and Celtic origin inhabited the region.

During the Roman administration (which extended to Syrmia and Banat), the original inhabitants were heavily romanized, and would later be known as Vlachs. The region of Bačka, which did not belong to the Roman Empire, was populated by Iranian Sarmatians (Iazyges). After the end of Roman rule, the romanized inhabitants of the area escaped to the Balkan Mountains (where they mixed with South Slavs) as well as the Romanian Carpathians (later known as Romanians).

The territory of present-day Vojvodina was invaded by the Turanic nomads such as the Huns and Avars, as well as by the Germanic Goths, Gepids, and Lombards, but after their military defeat, they were quickly absorbed by the local (Slavic) population, without leaving much ethnic traces in the region's population.

During the early medieval migrations, Slavs (Severans, Abodrites, Braničevci, Timočani, and Serbs) settled in the territory of present-day Vojvodina in the 6th and 7th centuries. Until the Hungarian conquest in the 10th century, the region had a dominant Slavic population.

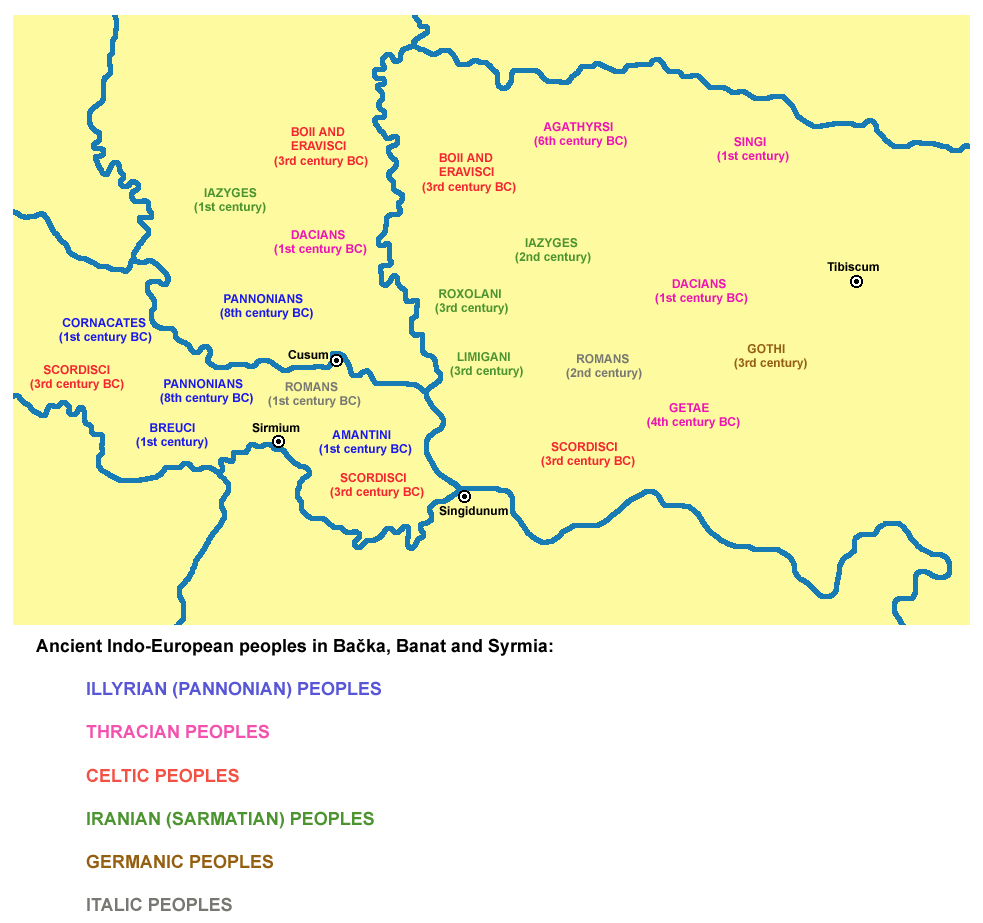
Indo-Europeans in Vojvodina, antiquity

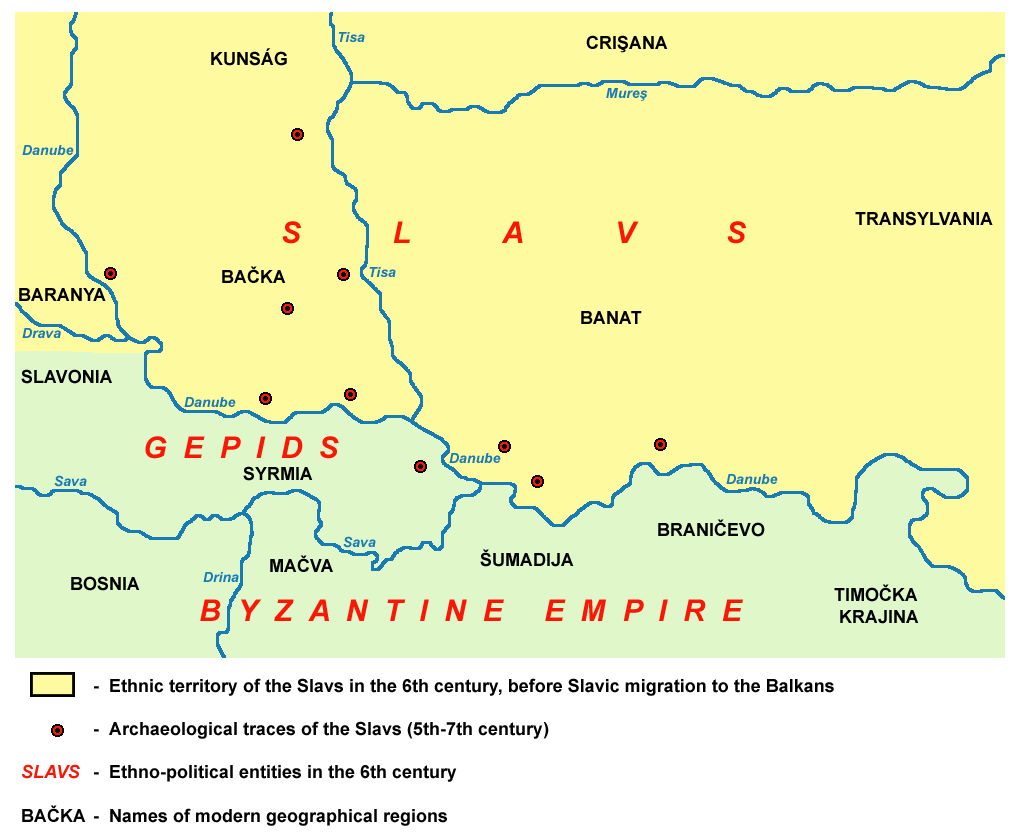
Slavs in Vojvodina, 6th century

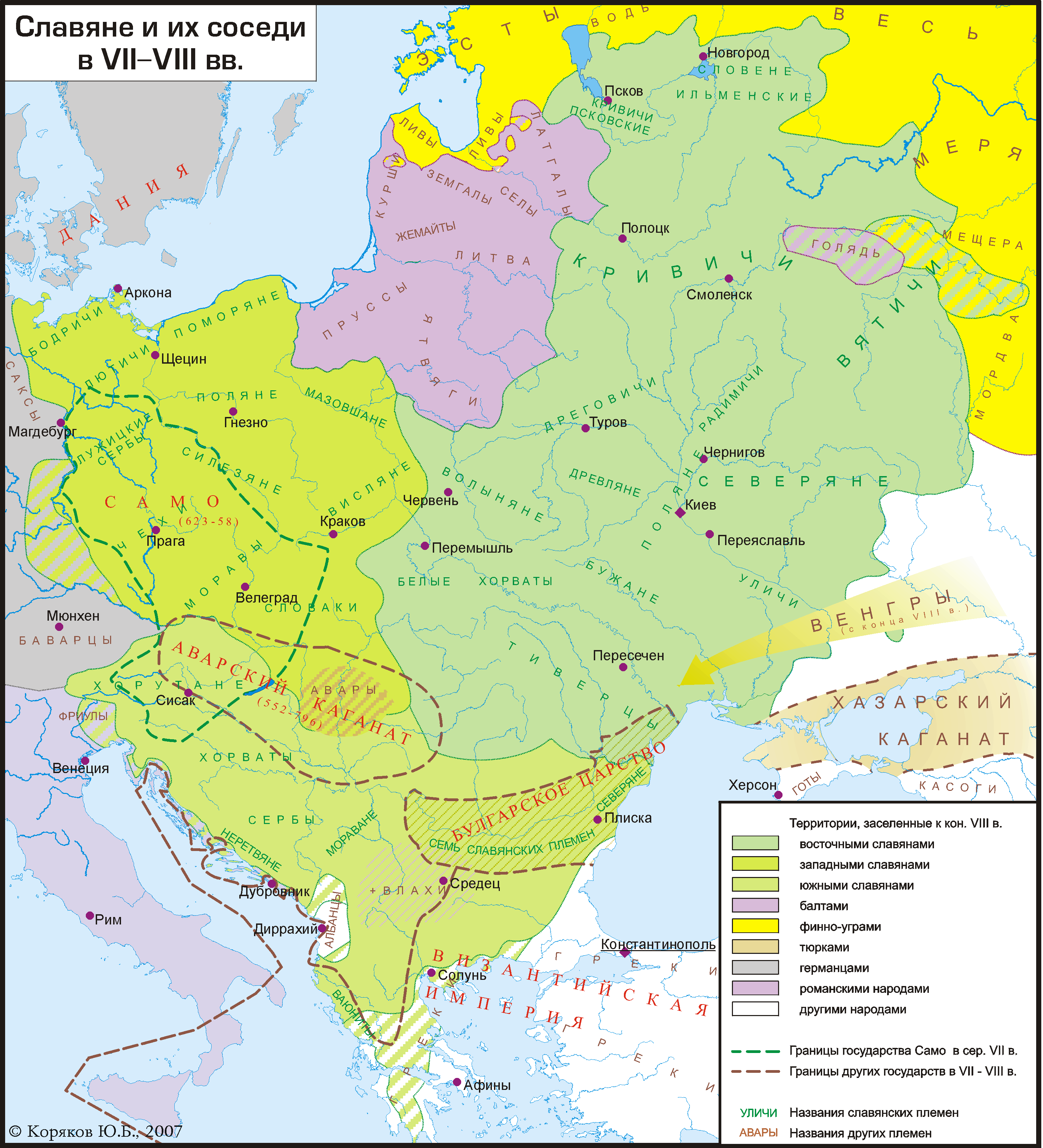
Slavs in Vojvodina, 7th–8th century

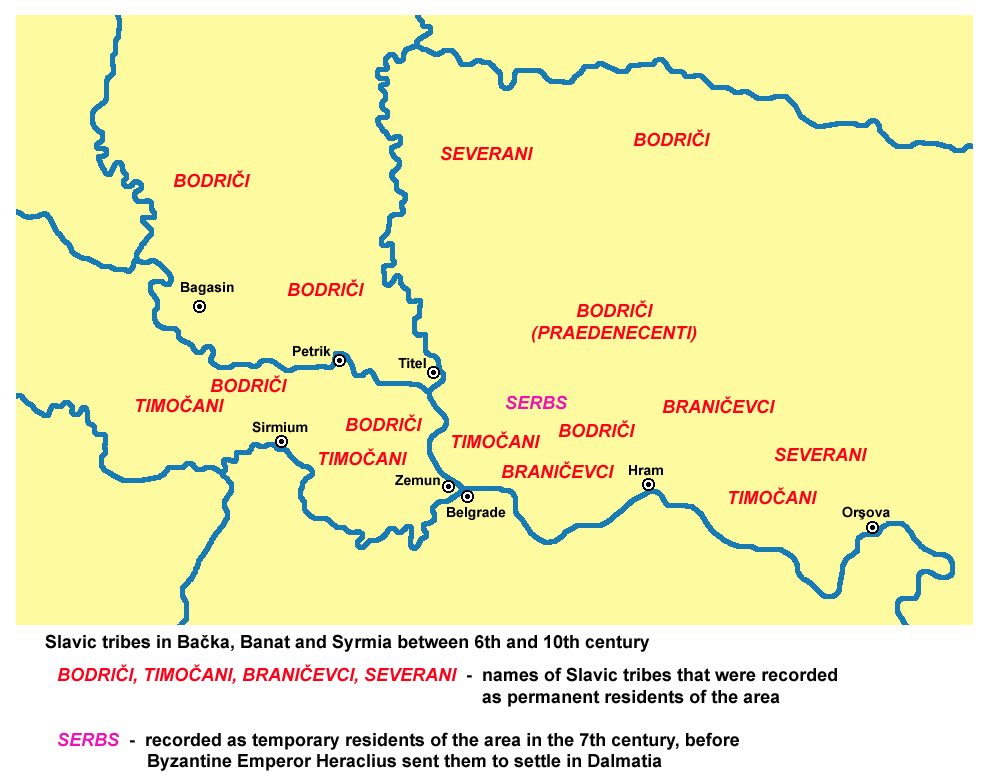
Slavs in Vojvodina, 9th century

The region was conquered by the Principality of Hungary in the 10th century, and Hungarians started to settle in the area. Hungarians mainly settled in the northern part of the region, where they lived mixed with Slavs. Until the late 12th and early 13th century, the region was mainly populated by Slavs, after which the proportions changed in favor of Hungarians. The larger number of Hungarians began settling in the region from the 13th century. The presence of Slavs in the area increased again in the 14th century with the arrival of Serbs from the south. During the Hungarian administration, much of the native local Slavs were Magyarization. Initially, the Hungarian language was spoken only by the knights and nobility of the Kingdom of Hungary, but it was later adopted also by the rest of the population. By the opinion of some researchers, the non-Magyarized descendants of these local Slavs are the present-day Šokci.

Although Serbs were part of the aboriginal Slavic population in the territory of present-day Vojvodina, especially in Syrmia, an increasing number of Serbs began settling from the 14th century onwards. Because of the presence of the large Serb population, many historical records and maps from the 15th to the 18th century refer to the territory of present-day Vojvodina as Raška.

The Ottoman Empire took control of Vojvodina in the 16th century, and this caused a massive depopulation of the region. Most of the Hungarians and many local Slavs fled from the region and escaped to the north. The majority of those who left in the region were Serbs, mainly now engaging either in farming or in Ottoman military service.

Under Ottoman policy, many Serbs were newly settled in the region. During the Ottoman administration, Serbs comprised an absolute majority of region's population. Villages were populated exclusively by Serbs, while towns were populated by various ethnic and religious groups, including mainly Muslims, but also some Serbs, Cincars, Greeks, Jews, and Roma.

The Habsburg monarchy took control of Vojvodina by the Treaty of Karlowitz (1699) and Treaty of Passarowitz (1718). Following the establishment of the Habsburg administration, the Muslim population fled from the region. Some of these Muslim refugees were resettled in Bosnia and Herzegovina. During the Habsburg administration, many new Serb settlers from the Ottoman Empire immigrated to the region. In 1687, the northern parts of the region were settled by ethnic Bunjevci.

Many other non-Serb settlers were also settled in the territory of present-day Vojvodina during the 18th and 19th century. These settlers were mainly Germans and Hungarians, but also included Rusyns, Slovaks, Romanians, and others. Because of this immigration, Serbs were no longer the absolute ethnic majority in the region, and Vojvodina became one of the most ethnically diverse regions of Europe. Nevertheless, Serbs remained the largest ethnic group in the region. According to the 1910 census, Serbs comprised 33.8% of the population in the territory of present-day Vojvodina. After Serbs, the most numerous ethnic groups were Hungarians (comprising 28.1%) and Germans (comprising 21.4%).

In 1918, Vojvodina became part of the Kingdom of Serbs, Croats, and Slovenes and new Serb settlers came to the region. As a consequence of the World War II, most Vojvodina Germans (about 200,000) left Vojvodina together with the defeated German Army. Those who remained in the region were confined to prison camps until 1948, when the camps were dissolved and Yugoslav citizenship was returned to the Germans. Despite this, the remaining German population would leave Yugoslavia for economic reasons, moving to Germany, other European countries, or the United States. In their place, new South Slavic (Serb, Montenegrin, Macedonian, Croat, etc.) colonists would settle in the region. Serbs regained the absolute majority in Vojvodina with 51% of the population in 1948, rising to 68% nowadays.

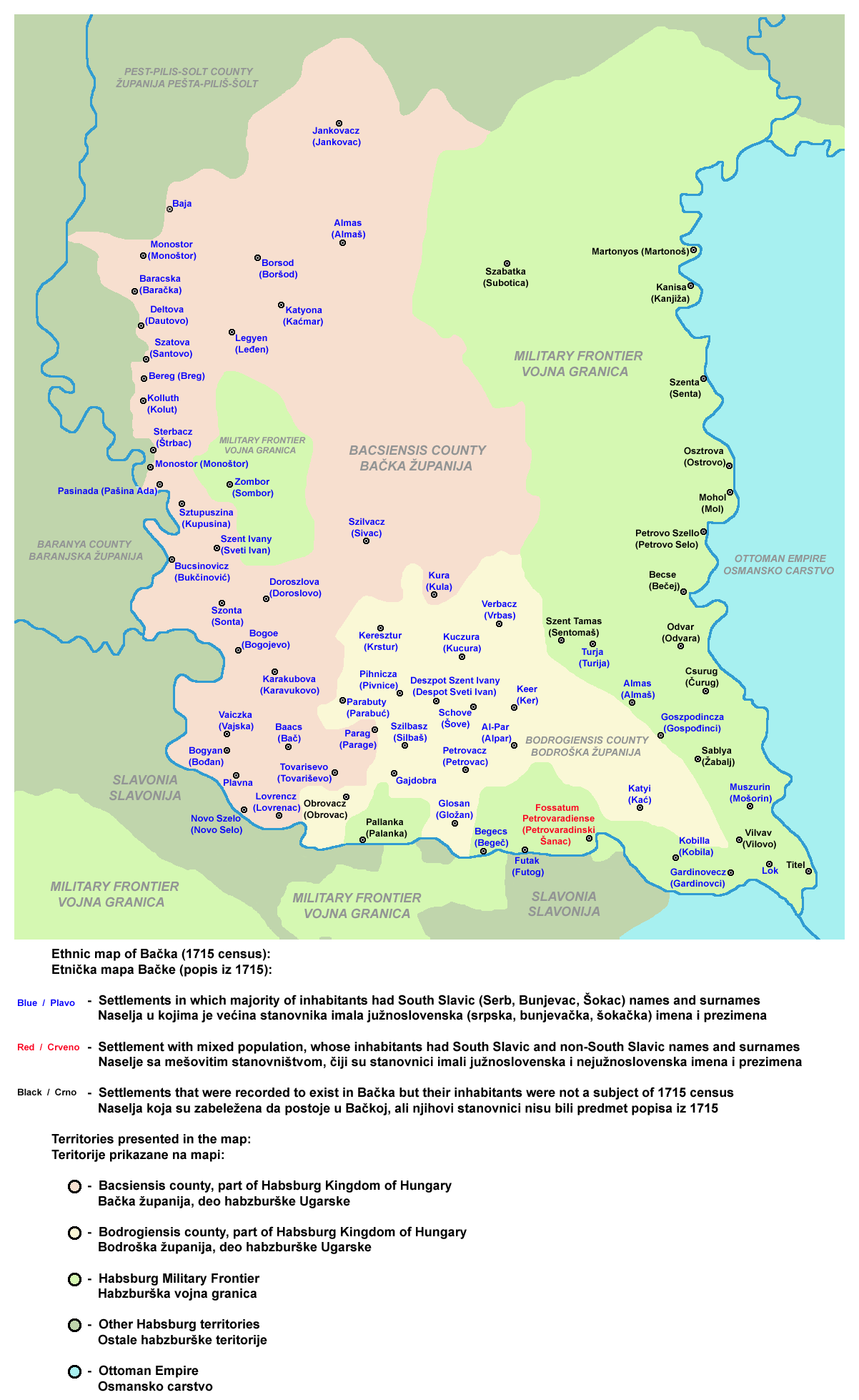
Ethnic map of Bačka, 1715

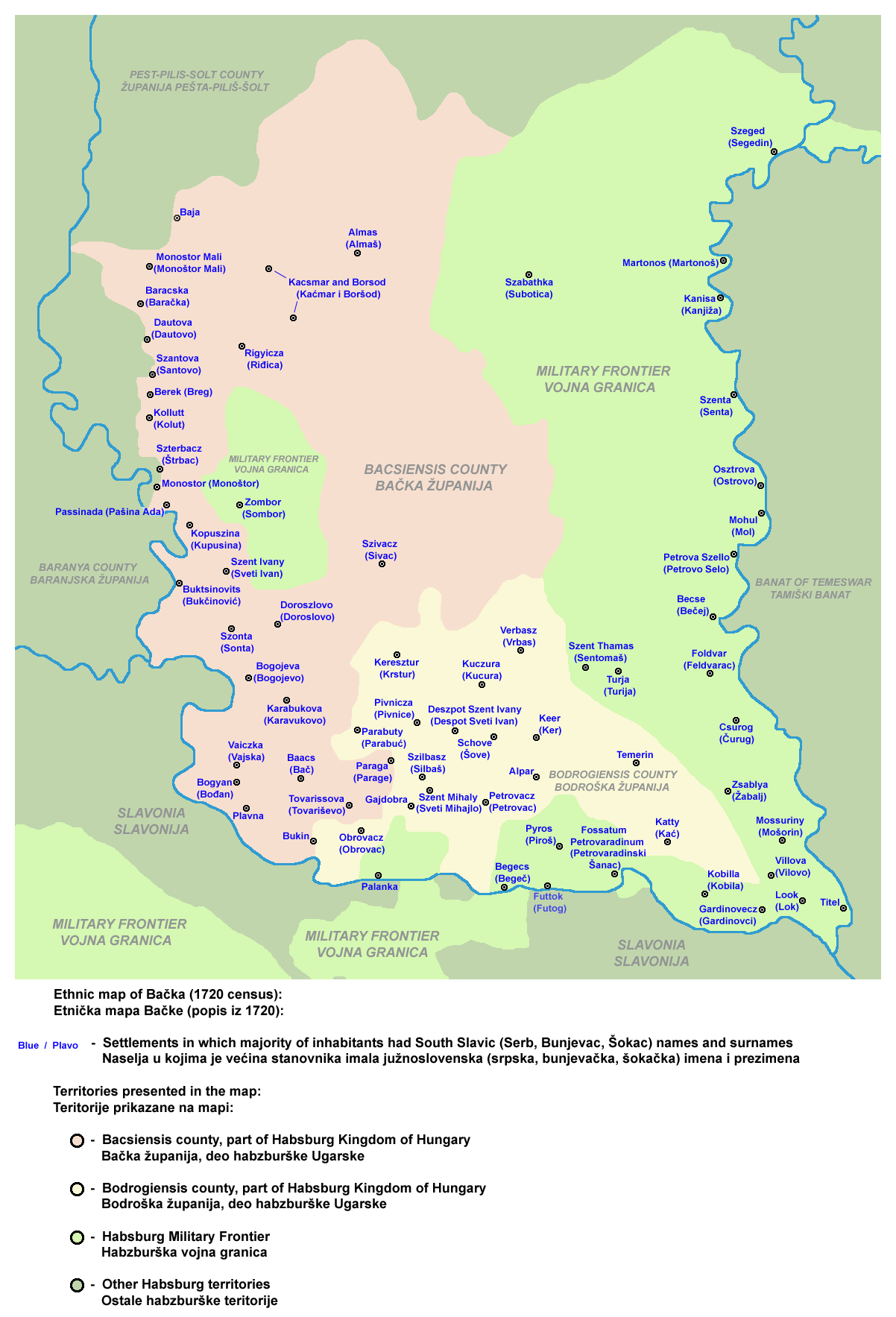
Ethnic map of Bačka, 1720

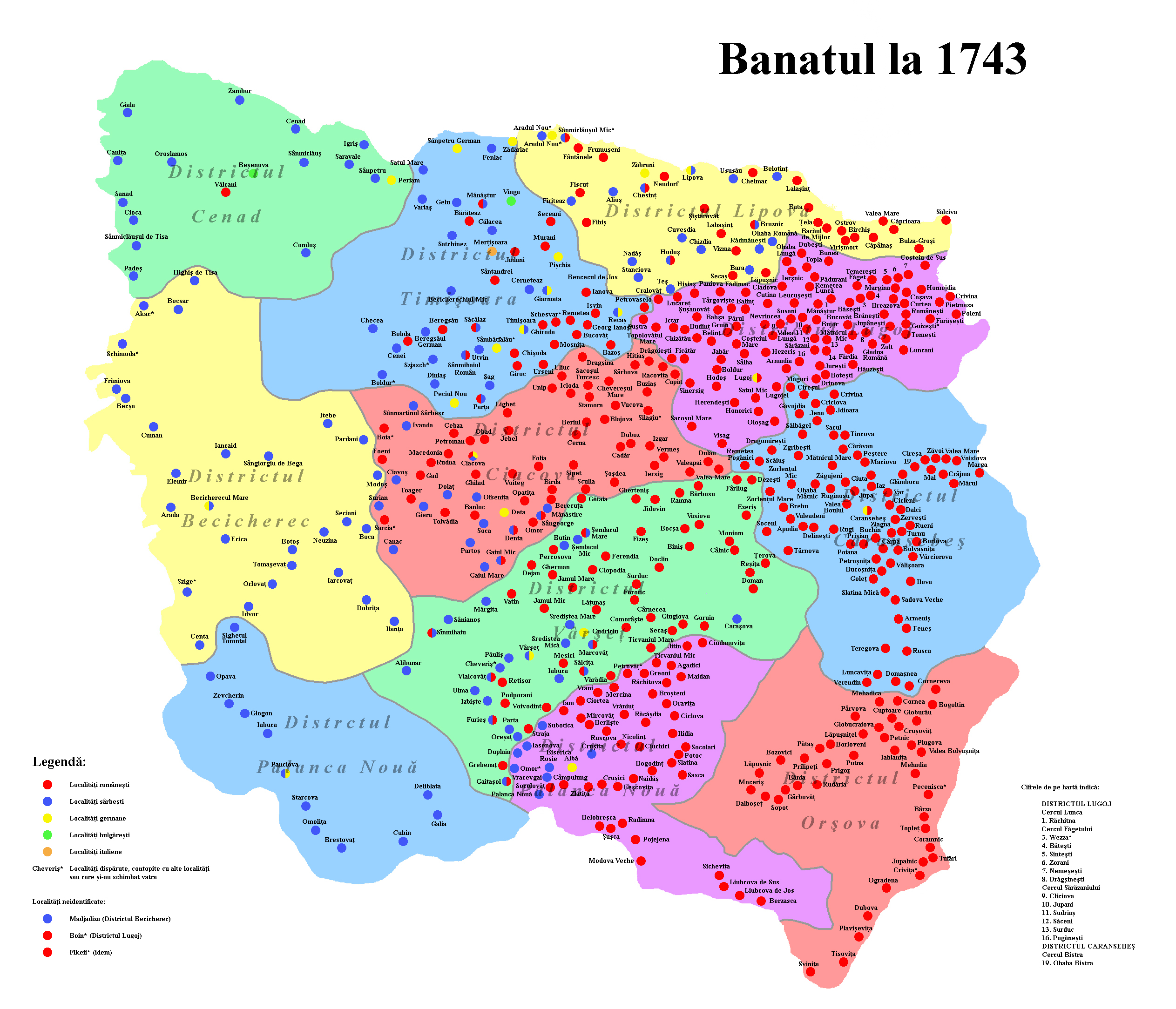
Ethnic map of Banat, 1743

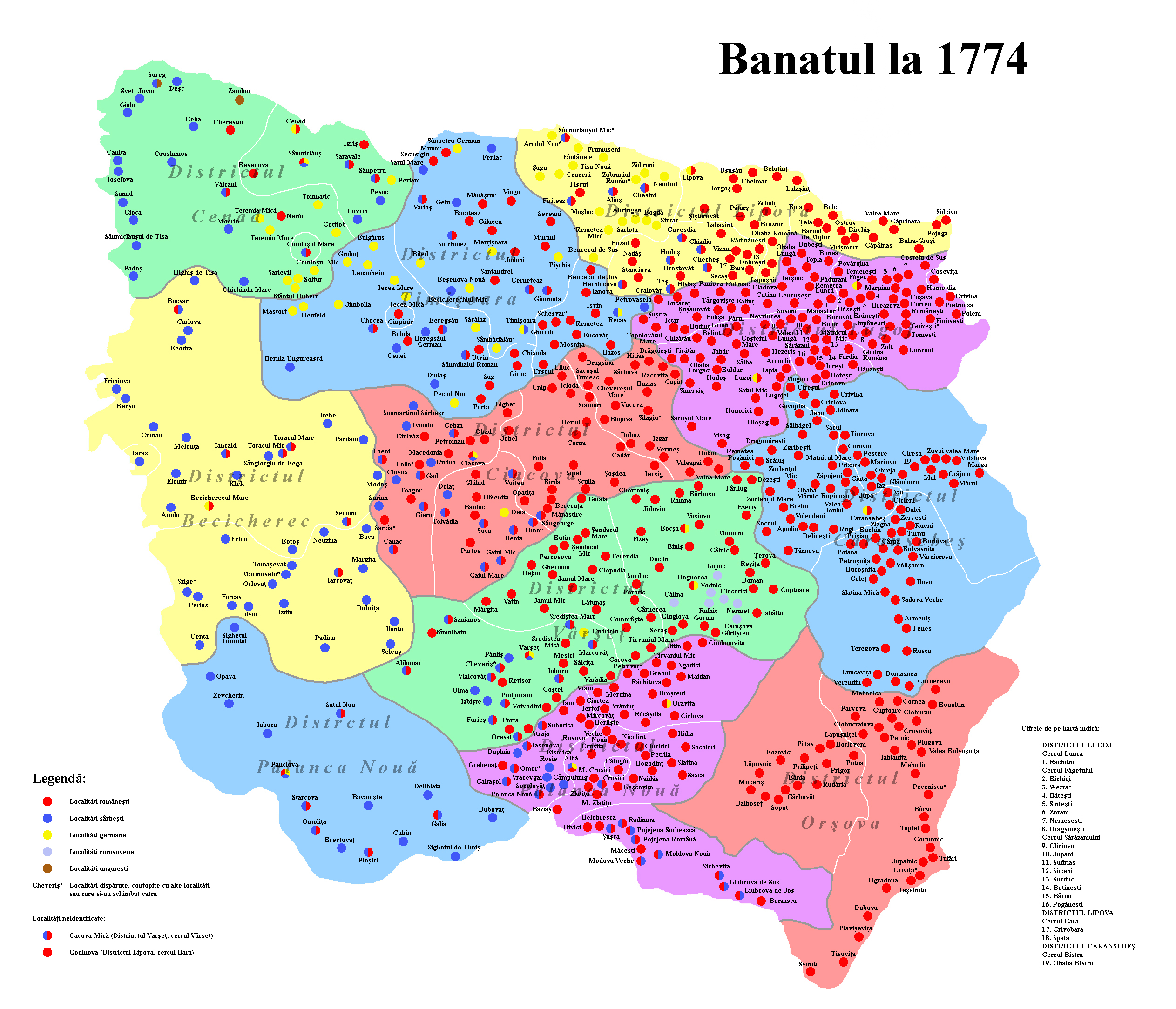
Ethnic map of Banat, 1774

== Principality of Hungary/Kingdom of Hungary ==
=== 9th century ===
When Hungarians arrived to Central Europe (in 896), this region was populated exclusively by Slavs.

=== 15th century ===
In the 15th century, according to opinion of various researchers, South Slavic (Serbian and Croatian) population was dominant in Syrmia and southern Banat, while Hungarian population was dominant in Bačka and northern Banat. Some 194,000 inhabitants might have been living on the present-day territory of Vojvodina in 1495. That number was calculated is based on data of the tax inventory. Some 52 townships (civitas, oppidium) and 801 villages could be found in the area, in which Hungarians are likely to have constituted the majority of population. According to this view, the population of the area included 148,000 Hungarians (76.1% of population), 39,000 Serbs (20%), and 7,500 Croats (3,9%). However, calculation of demographic data from this time period can be described as vague and of a rather varied nature, due to the lack of censuses that would collect comprehensive ethnic information. For the time of the Hungarian royal tax registration in 1495, conclusions for a probable absolute or relative „ethnic" majority of the population living in the area were drawn from the given sources through analysing direct references of „ethnic nature", in most cases by the linguistic analysis of taxpayers' names and that of geographical names.

== Ottoman Empire ==
During Ottoman administration (16th–18th century), the area of present-day Vojvodina had an absolute Serb majority.

== Habsburg monarchy/Austria-Hungary ==
=== 1690 ===
In 1690, about 210,000 Serbs lived in territory of present-day Vojvodina (excluding Syrmia). In this time, almost entire population of the region was composed of Serbs, also including some Šokci.

=== 1715 ===
According to the Austrian census in Bačka from 1715, Serbs, Bunjevci, and Šokci comprised 97.6% of population.

=== 1718–1720 ===
After the Treaty of Passarowitz in 1718, the first Habsburg census in Banat recorded about 20,000 inhabitants, mostly Serbs. The 1720 census in Bačka recorded 72% Serbs and 22% Bunjevci and Šokci.

=== 1787 ===
Ethnicity	Population	Share
Serbs	281,690	59.2%
Germans	58,866	12.4%
Hungarians	50,316	10.6%
Croats	38,161	8.0%
Romanians	27,436	5.8%
Slovaks	9,704	2.0%
Rusyns	3,836	0.8%
Total	476,018

=== 1828 ===
Ethnicity	Population	Share
Serbs	442,923	51.1%
Germans	142,653	16.4%
Hungarians	130,918	15.1%
Croats	67,692	7.8%
Romanians	46,645	5.4%
Slovaks	19,464	2.2%
Rusyns	6,068	0.7%
Total	864,281

=== 1840 ===
Ethnicity	Population	Share
Serbs	448,341	49.1%
Germans	154,047	16.9%
Hungarians	145,930	16.0%
Croats	66,362	7.3%
Romanians	55,984	6.1%
Slovaks	22,924	2.5%
Rusyns	7,373	0.8%
Total	912,754

=== 1857 ===
Ethnicity	Population	Share
Serbs	417,838	40.5%
Germans	217,510	21.1%
Hungarians	202,188	19.6%
Romanians	65,387	6.3%
Croats	60,690	5.9%
Slovaks	35,328	3.4%
Rusyns	8,452	0.8%
Total	1,030,545

=== 1880 ===
Ethnicity	Population	Share
Serbs	416,116	35.5%
Germans	285,920	24.4%
Hungarians	265,287	22.6%
Croats	72,486	6.2%
Romanians	69,668	5.9%
Slovaks	43,318	3.7%
Rusyns	9,299	0.8%
Others	10,635	0.9%
Total	1,172,729

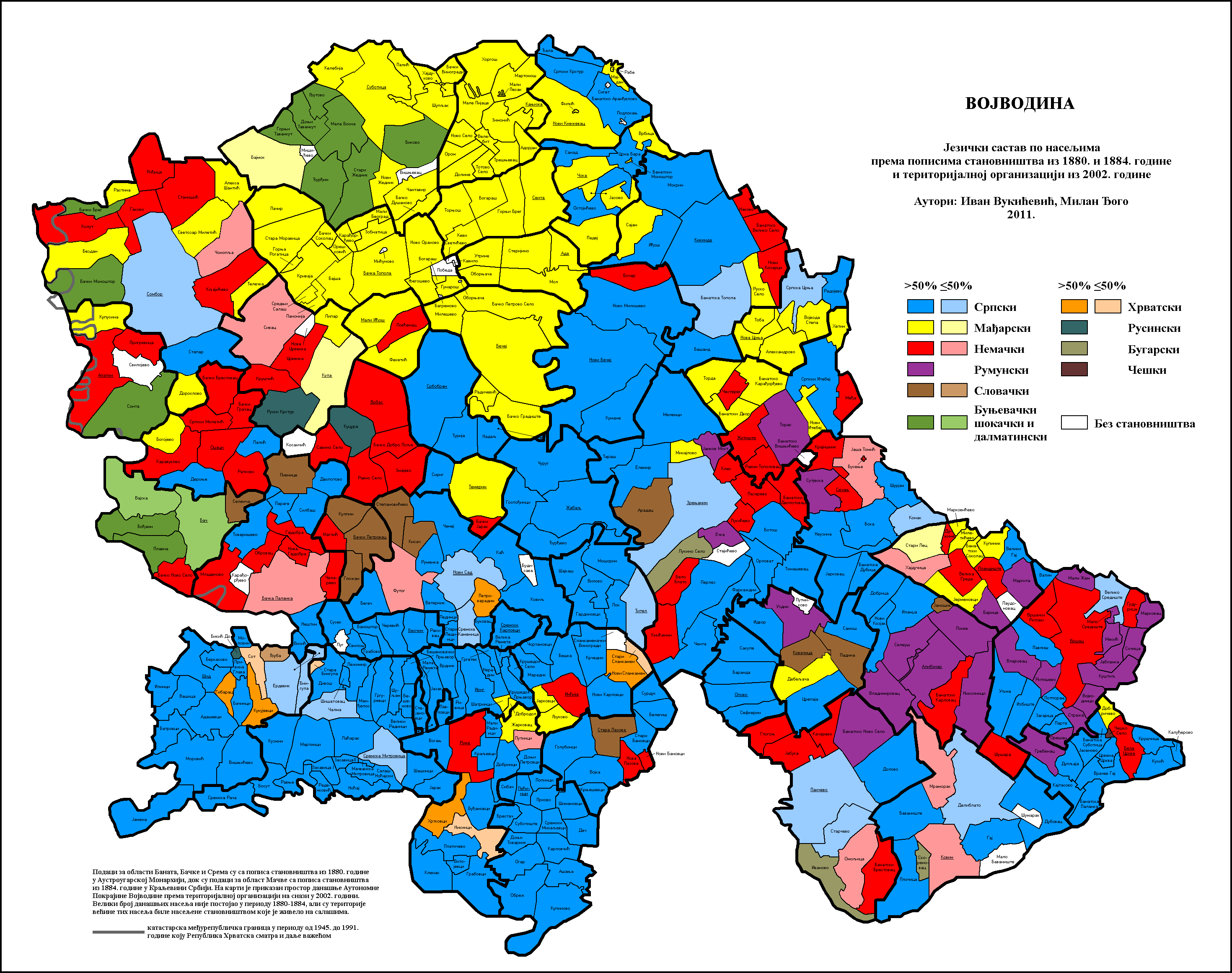
Language map of Vojvodina by settlements, 1880–1884

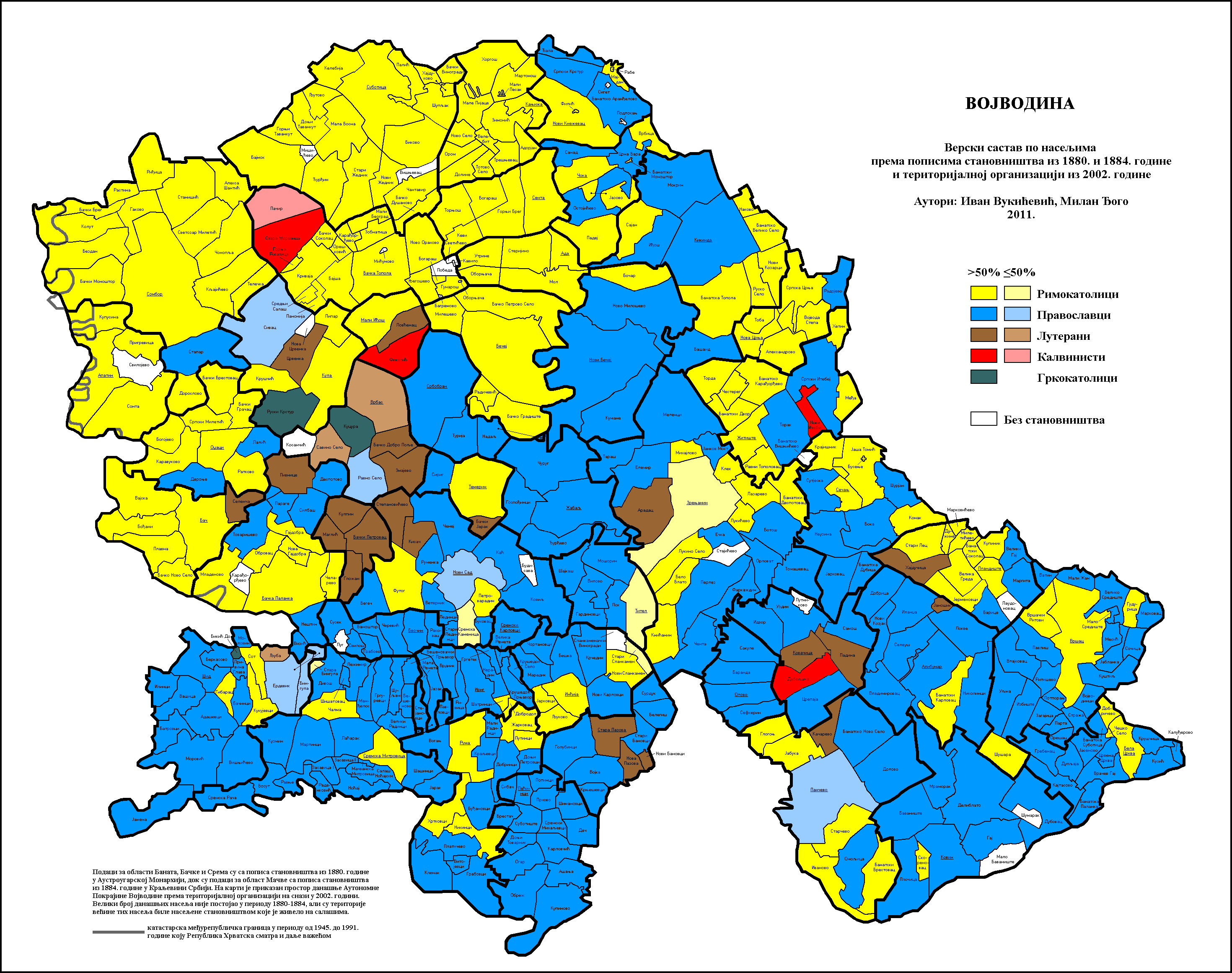
Religion map of Vojvodina by settlements, 1880–1884

=== 1890 ===
Ethnicity	Population	Share
Serbs	457,873	34.4%
Hungarians	324,430	24.4%
Germans	321,563	24.2%
Croats	80,404	6.0%
Romanians	73,492	5.5%
Slovaks	49,834	3.7%
Rusyns	11,022	0.8%
Others	12,525	1.0%
Total	1,331,143

=== 1900 ===
Ethnicity	Population	Share
Serbs	483,176	33.7%
Hungarians	378,634	26.4%
Germans	336,430	23.5%
Croats	80,901	5.6%
Romanians	74,718	5.2%
Slovaks	53,832	3.8%
Rusyns	12,663	0.9%
Others	12,394	0.9%
Total	1,432,748

=== 1910 ===
Ethnicity	Population	Share
Serbs	510,186	33.8%
Hungarians	424,555	28.1%
Germans	323,779	21.4%
Romanians	75,223	5.0%
Slovaks	56,689	3.7%
Croats	34,089	2.3%
Rusyns	13,479	0.9%
Others	72,804	4.8%
Total	1,512,983

Note: linguistic data from this census might not correspond with ethnic structure in some settlements (Novi Sad, Subotica, Zrenjanin, etc.), due to the fact that Hungarian language was spoken by several ethnicities (Hungarians, Jews, Bunjevci, etc.).

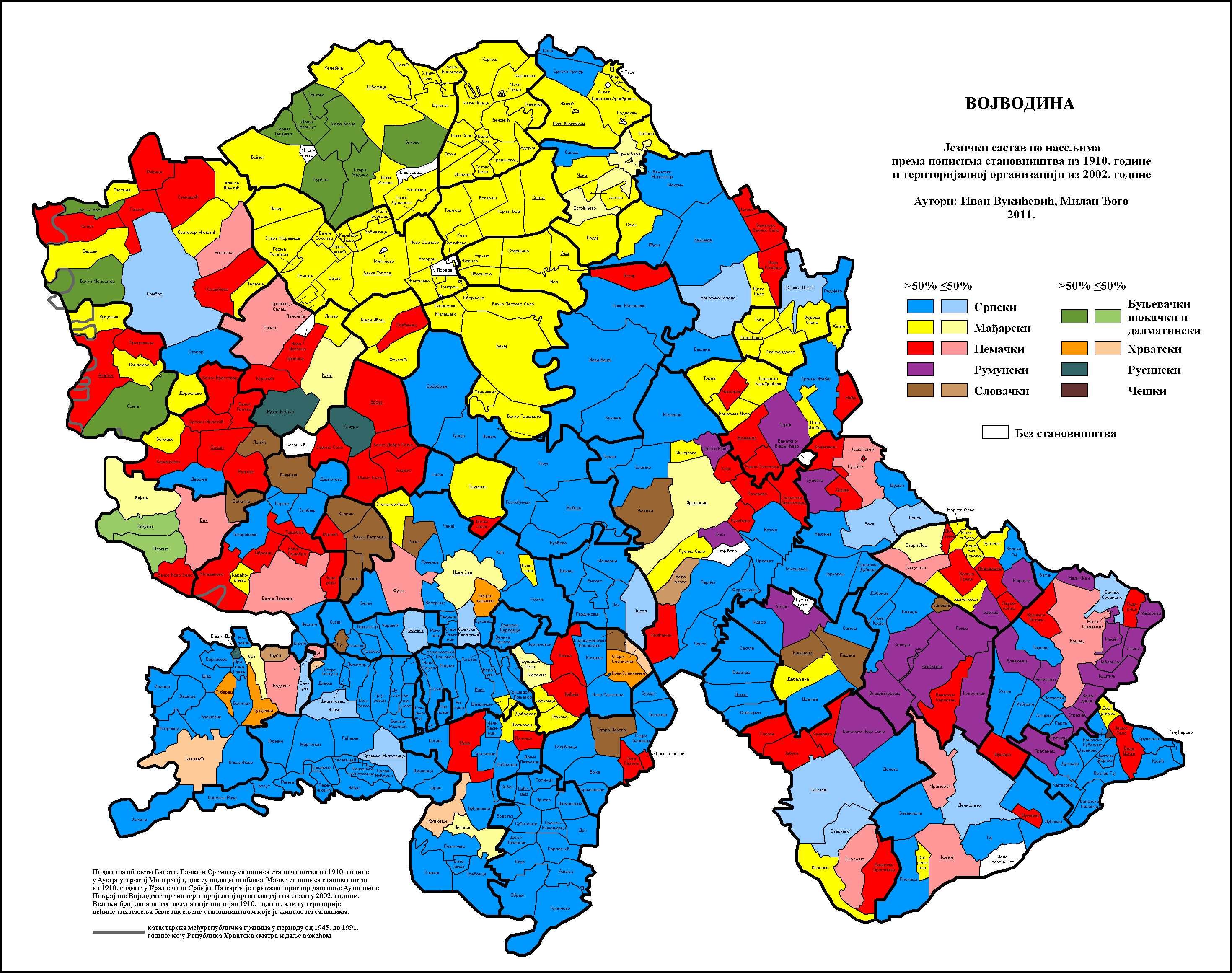
Language map of Vojvodina by settlements, 1910

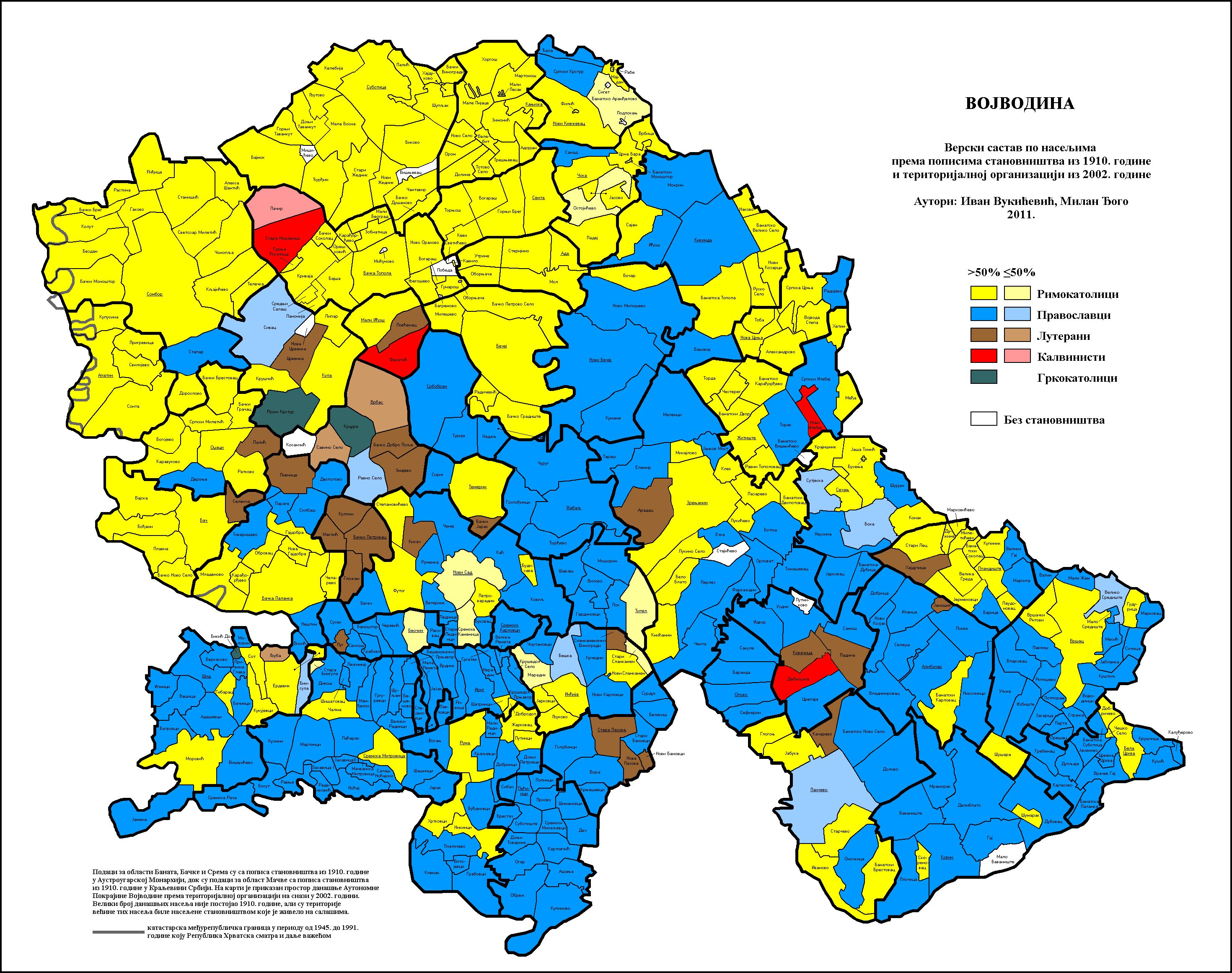
Religion map of Vojvodina by settlements, 1910

== Yugoslavia/Serbia ==
=== 1921 ===
Ethnicity	Population	Share
Serbs	526,134	34.7%
Hungarians	370,040	24.4%
Germans	333,272	22.0%
Croats	122,684	8.1%
Romanians	65,197	4.3%
Slovaks	58,273	3.8%
Rusyns	13,664	0.9%
Others	25,182	1.7%
Total	1,528,238

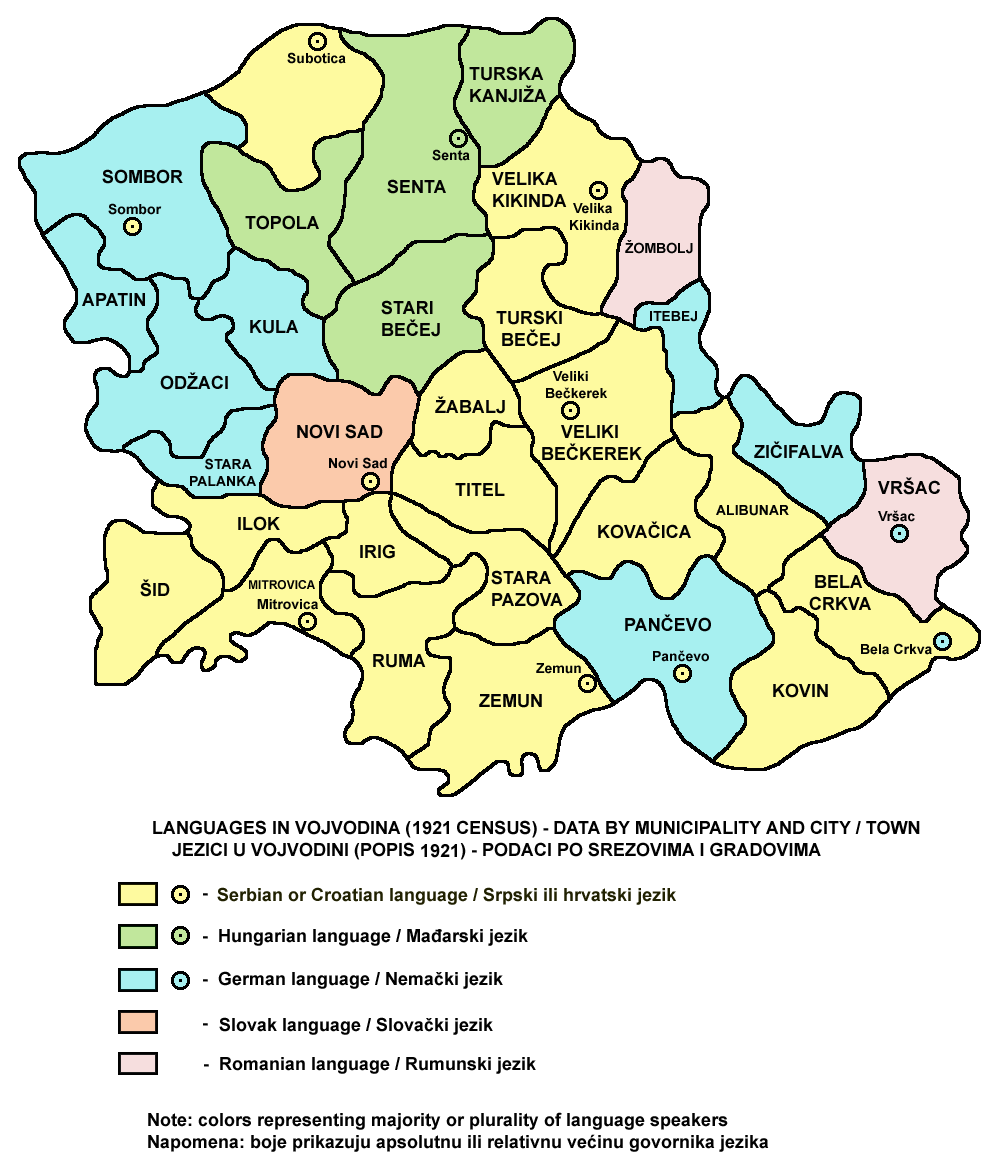
Language map of Vojvodina, 1921

=== 1931 ===
Ethnicity	Population	Share
Serbs	528,000	33%
Hungarians	413,000	26%
Germans	343,000	21%
Croats	120,000	7%
Romanians	78,000	5%
Slovaks	67,000	4%
Rusyns	21,000	1%
Jews	21,000	1%
Others	37,000	2%
Total	1,624,158

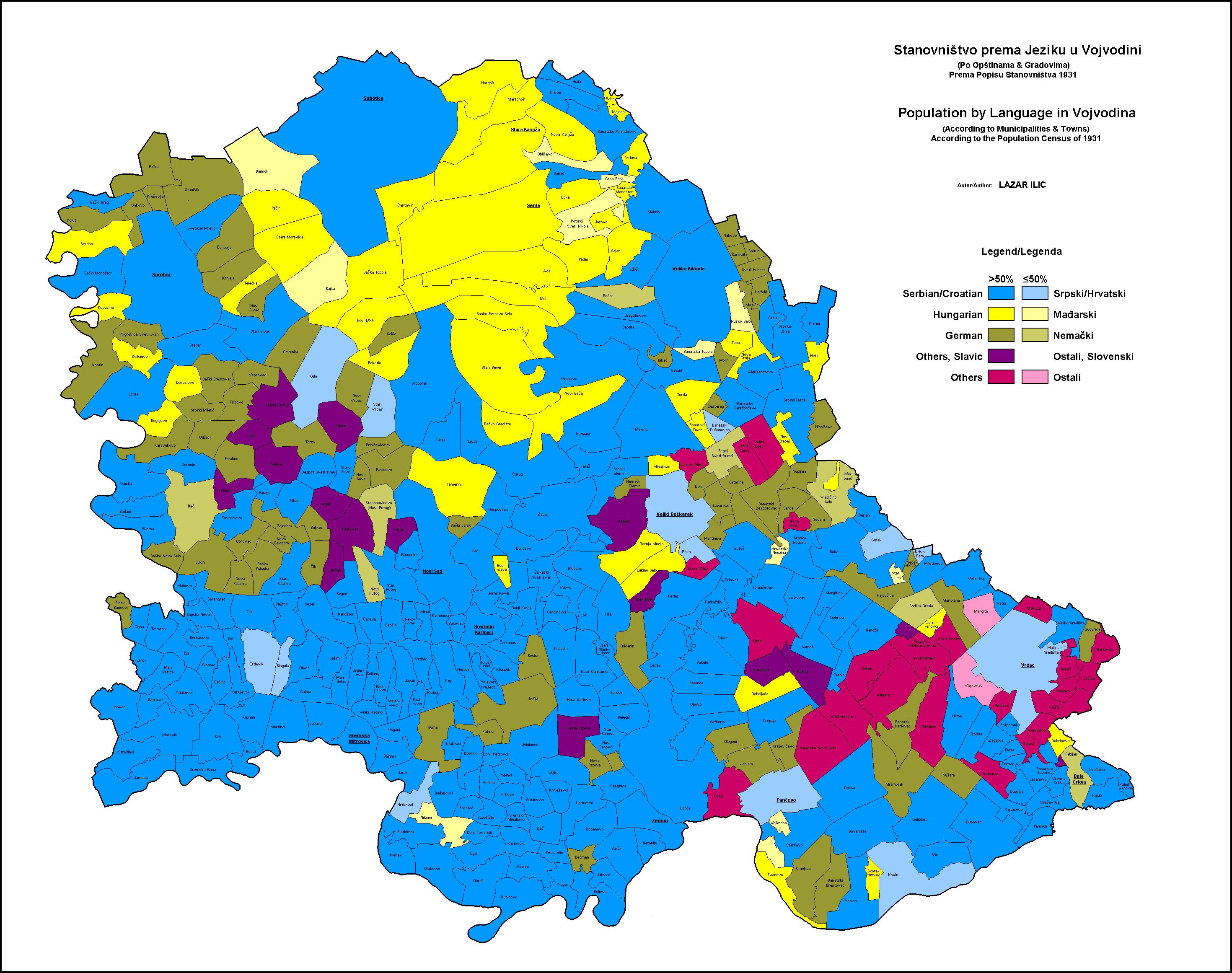
Language map of Vojvodina, 1931

=== 1941 ===
Ethnicity	Population	Share
Serbs	577,067	35.3%
Hungarians	465,920	28.5%
Germans	318,259	19.4%
Croats	105,810	6.5%
Others	169,311	10.3%
Total	1,636,367

Note: 1941 census data for Bačka was combined with 1931 census data for Banat and Syrmia.

=== 1948 ===
Ethnicity	Population	Share
Serbs	841,246	50.6%
Hungarians	428,932	25.8%
Croats	134,232	8.1%
Slovaks	72,032	4.3%
Romanians	59,263	3.6%
Germans	31,821	1.9%
Montenegrins	30,589	1.9%
Rusyns, Ukrainians	22,083	1.3%
Others	42,714	2.5%
Total	1,663,212

=== 1953 ===
Ethnicity	Population	Share
Serbs	865,538	50.9%
Hungarians	435,179	25.6%
Croats	127,027	7.5%
Slovaks	71,153	4.2%
Romanians	57,218	3.4%
Montenegrins	30,516	1.8%
Rusyns	23,038	1.4%
Others	89,876	5.3%
Total	1,699,545

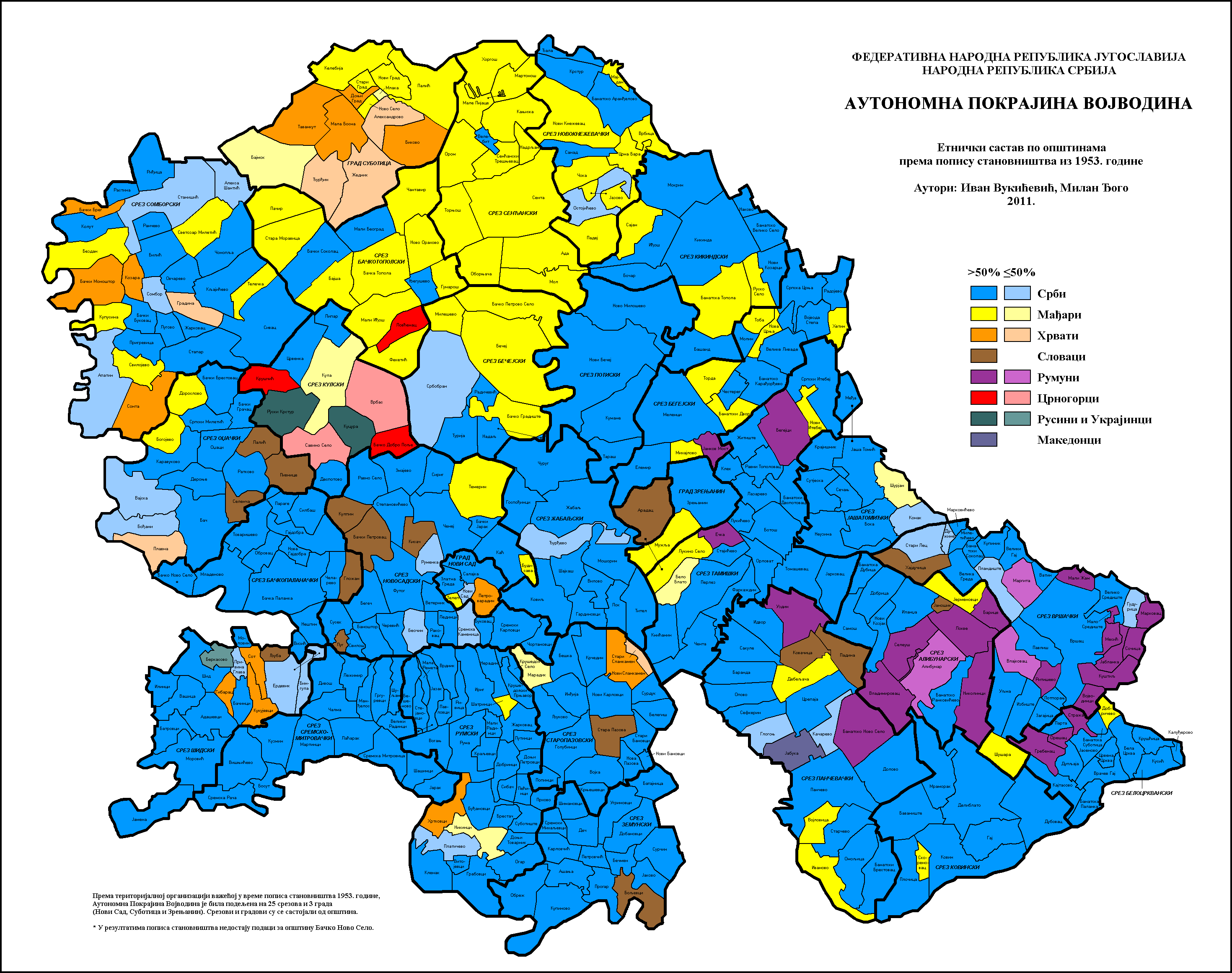
Ethnic map of Vojvodina, 1953

=== 1961 ===
Ethnicity	Population	Share
Serbs	1,017,713	54.9%
Hungarians	442,560	23.9%
Croats	145,341	7.8%
Slovaks	73,830	4.0%
Romanians	57,259	3.1%
Montenegrins	34,782	1.9%
Rusyns	23,038	1.4%
Others	95,462	5.1%
Total	1,854,965

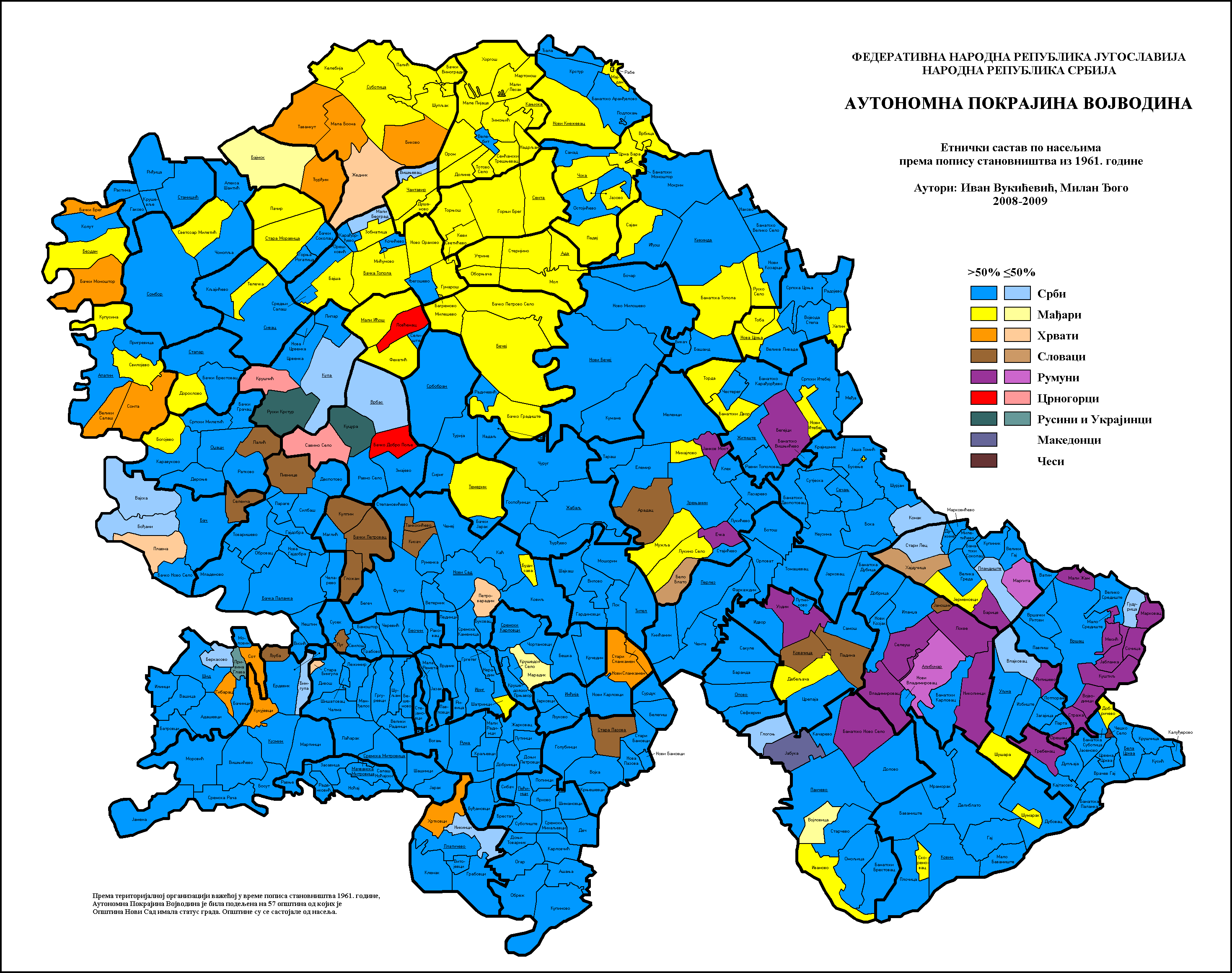
Ethnic map of Vojvodina by settlements, 1961

=== 1971 ===
Ethnicity	Population	Share
Serbs	1,089,132	55.8%
Hungarians	423,866	21.7%
Croats	138,561	7.1%
Slovaks	72,795	3.7%
Romanians	52,987	2.7%
Montenegrins	36,416	1.9%
Rusyns	20,109	1.0%
Others	118,667	6.0%
Total	1,952,533

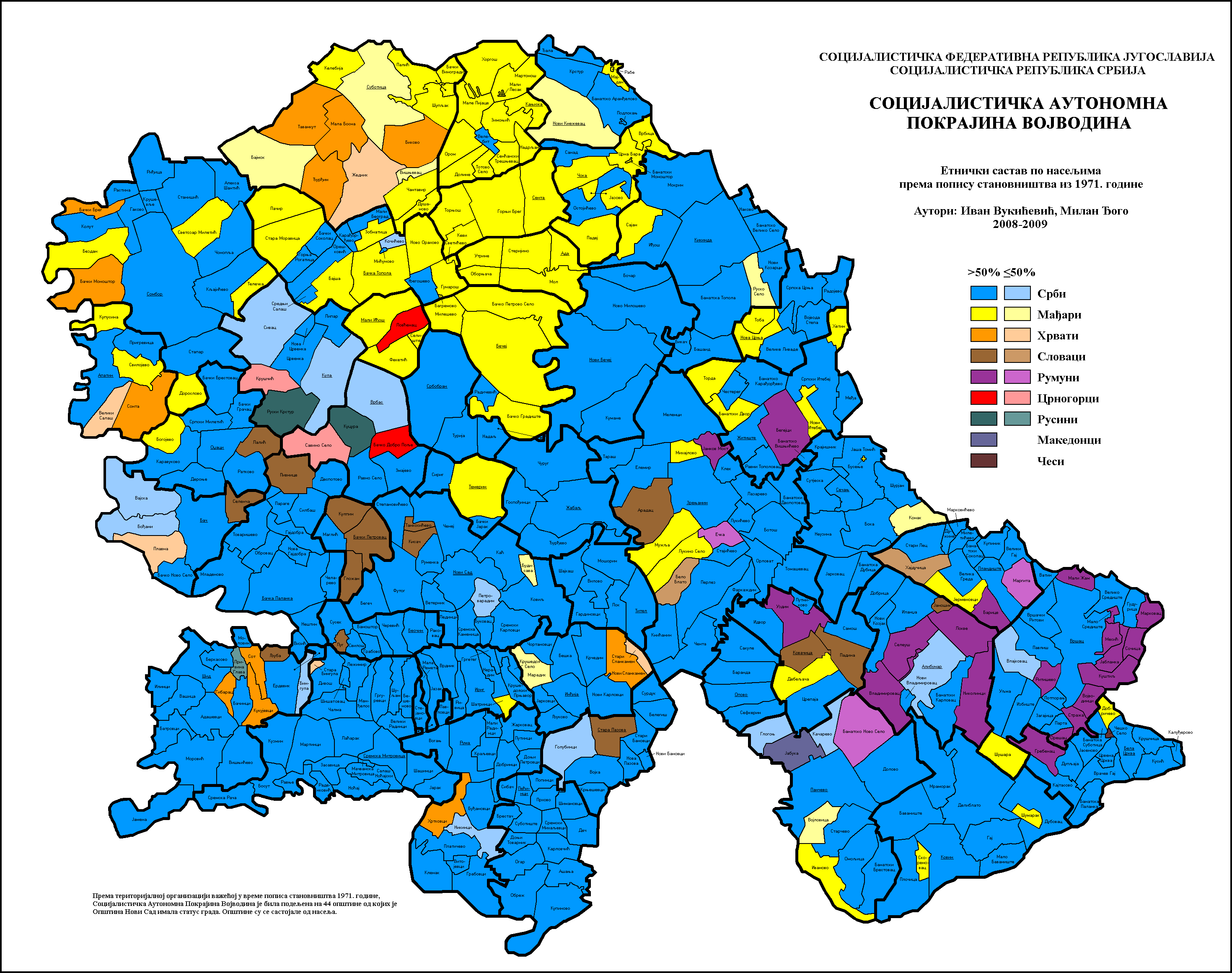
Ethnic map of Vojvodina by settlements, 1971

=== 1981 ===
Ethnicity	Population	Share
Serbs	1,107,375	54.4%
Hungarians	385,356	18.9%
Croats	119,157	5.9%
Slovaks	69,549	3.4%
Romanians	47,289	2.3%
Montenegrins	43,304	2.1%
Rusyns	24,306	1.2%
Others	238,436	11.7%
Total	2,034,772

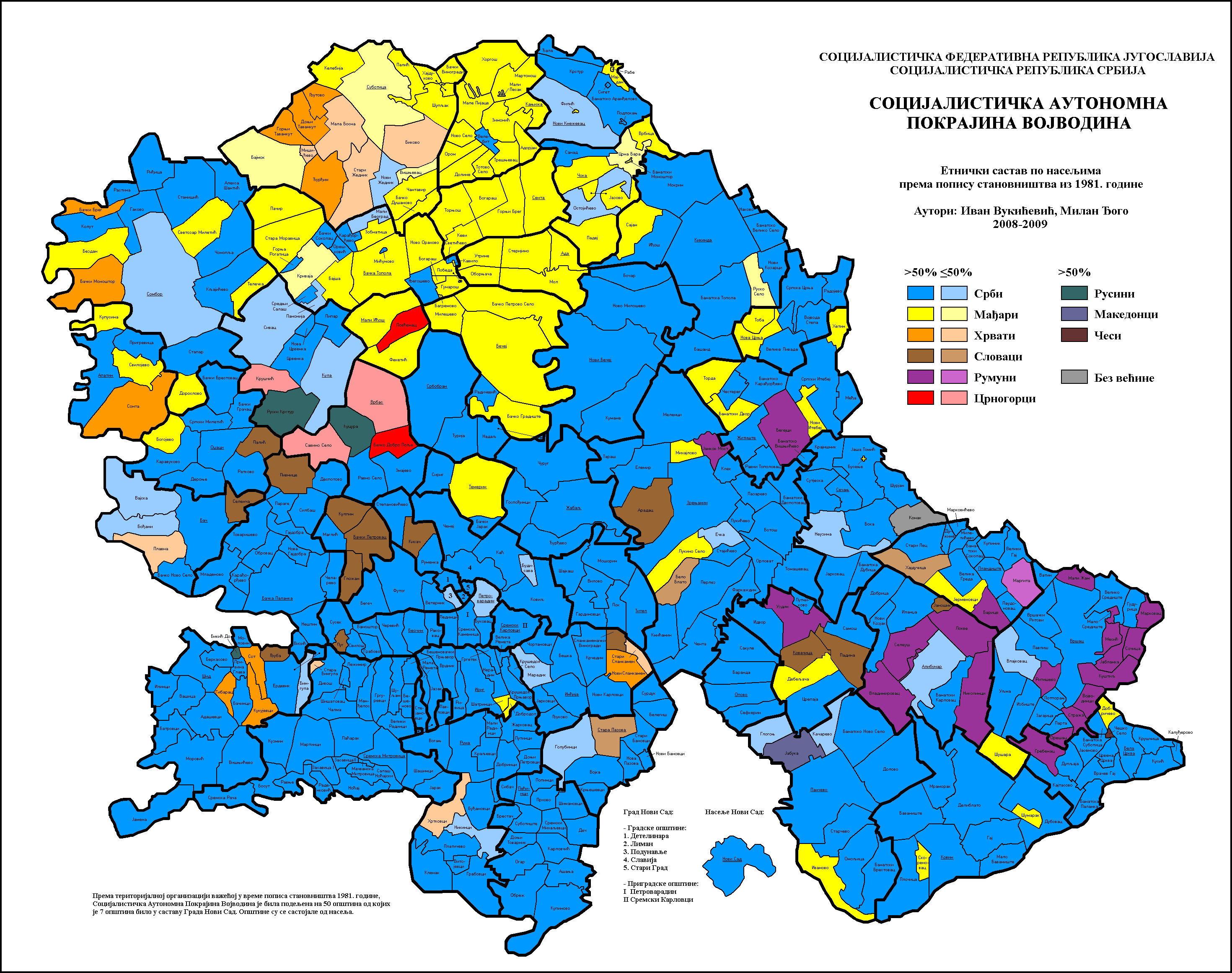
Ethnic map of Vojvodina by settlements, 1981

=== 1991 ===
Ethnicity	Population	Share
Serbs	1,151,353	57.2%
Hungarians	340,946	16.9%
Yugoslavs	168,859	8.4%
Croats	74,226	3.7%
Slovaks	63,941	3.2%
Montenegrins	44,721	2.2%
Romanians	38,832	1.9%
Roma	24,895	1.2%
Bunjevci	21,552	1.1%
Rusyns	17,889	0.9%
Others	65,305	3.2%
Total	2,012,517

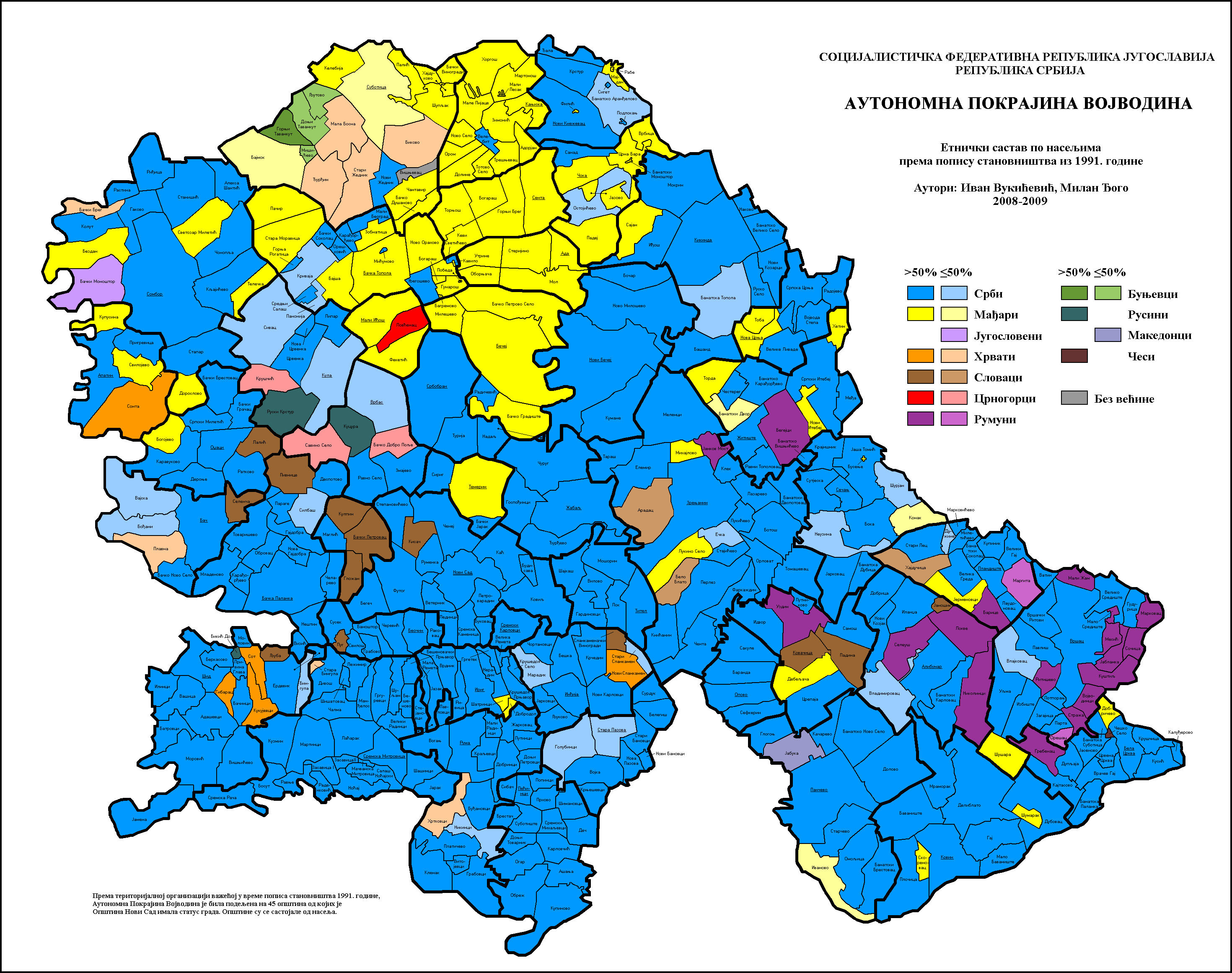
Ethnic map of Vojvodina by settlements, 1991

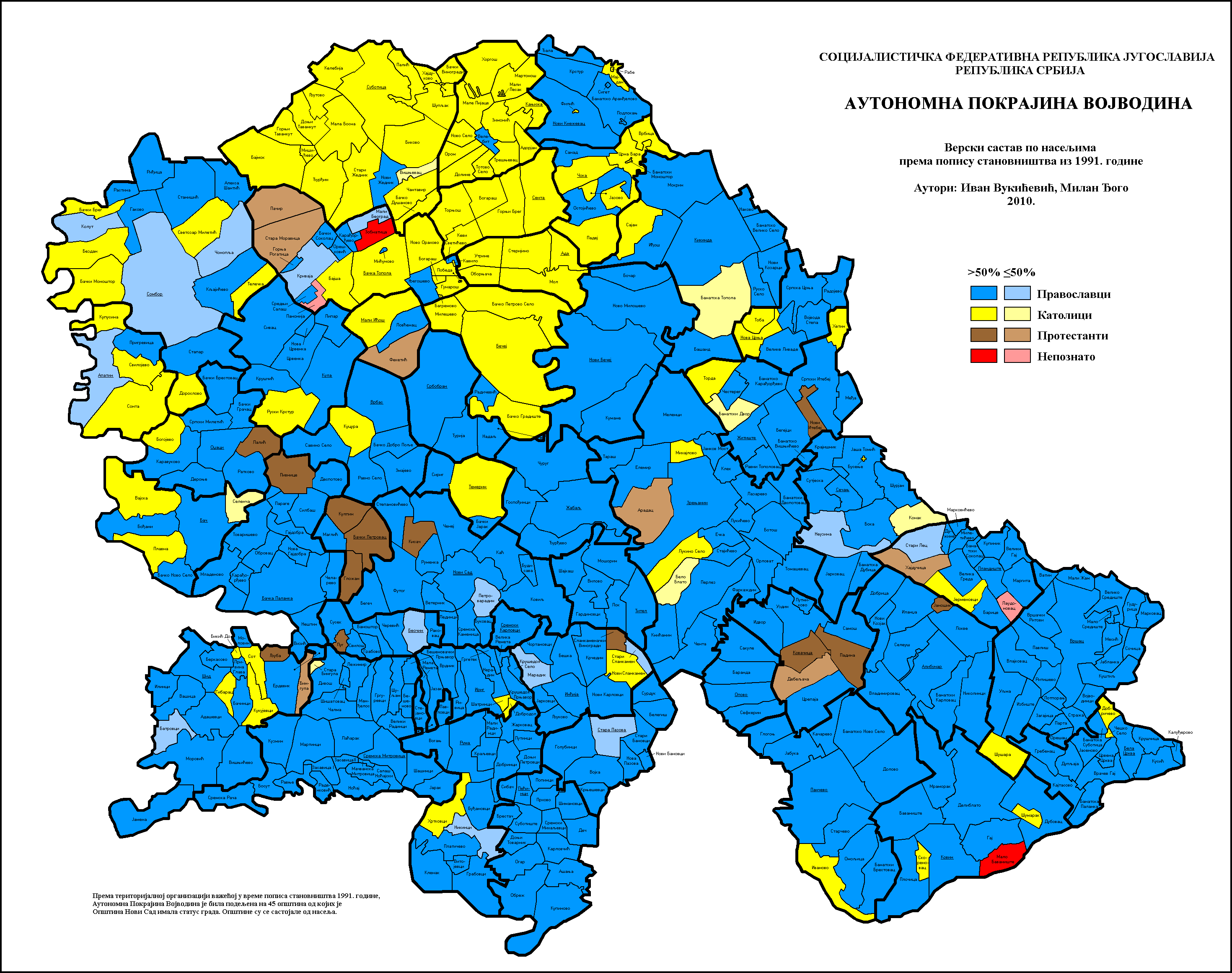
Religious map of Vojvodina by settlements, 1991

=== 2002 ===
Ethnicity	Population	Share
Serbs	1,321,807	65.0%
Hungarians	290,207	14.3%
Slovaks	56,637	2.8%
Croats	56,546	2.8%
Yugoslavs	49,881	2.4%
Montenegrins	35,513	1.7%
Romanians	30,419	1.5%
Roma	29,057	1.4%
Bunjevci	19,766	0.9%
Rusyns	15,626	0.7%
Others	37,589	1.8%
Regional identity	10,154	0.5%
Undeclared	55,016	2.7%
Unknown	23,774	1.1%
Total	2,031,992

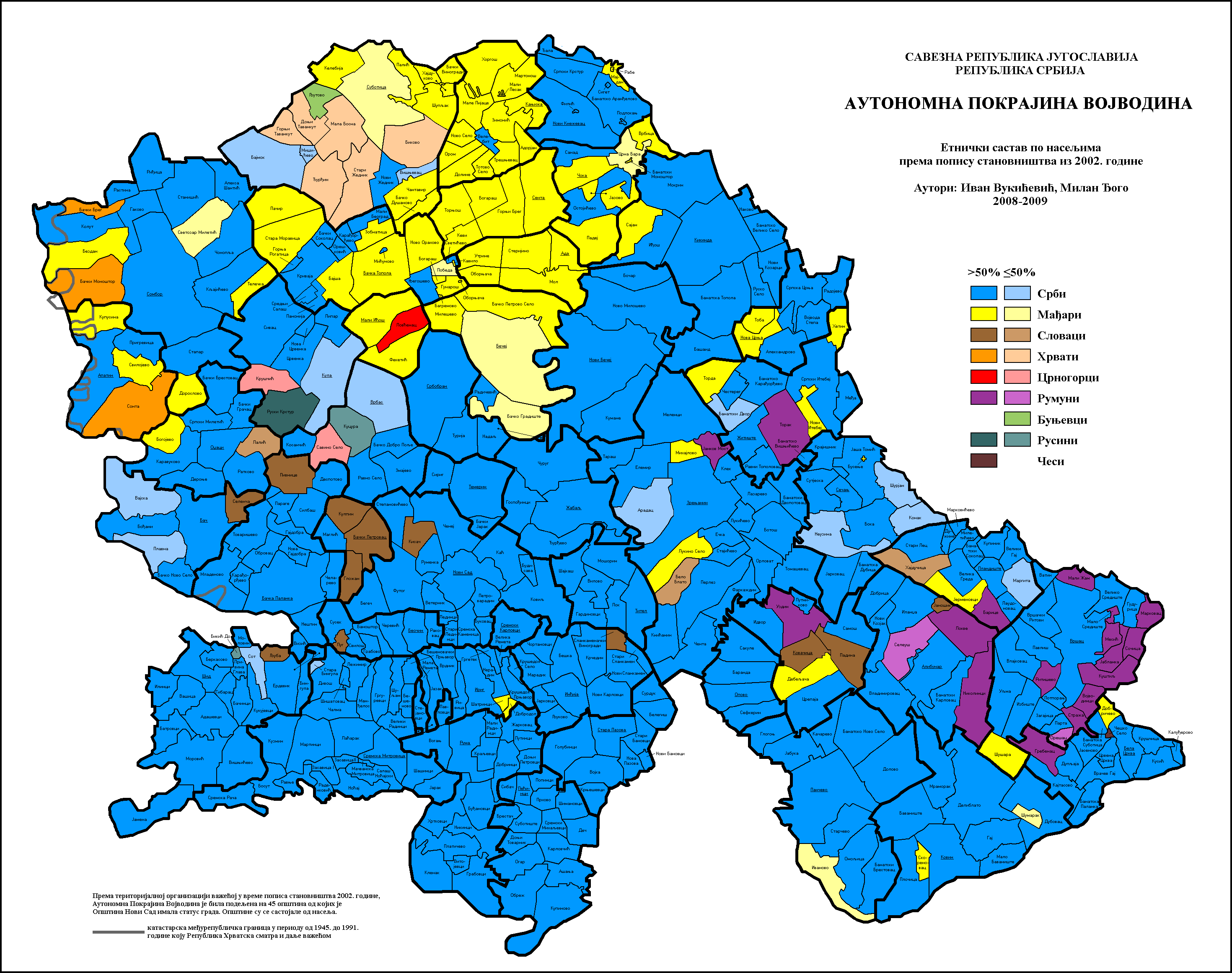
Ethnic map of Vojvodina by settlements, 2002

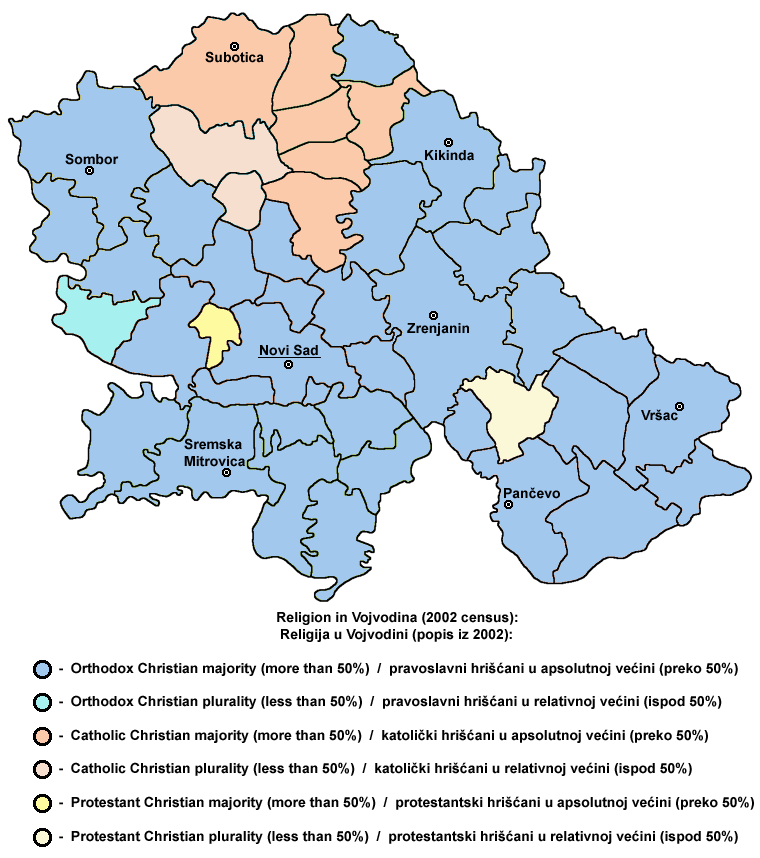
Religious map of Vojvodina by municipalities, 2002

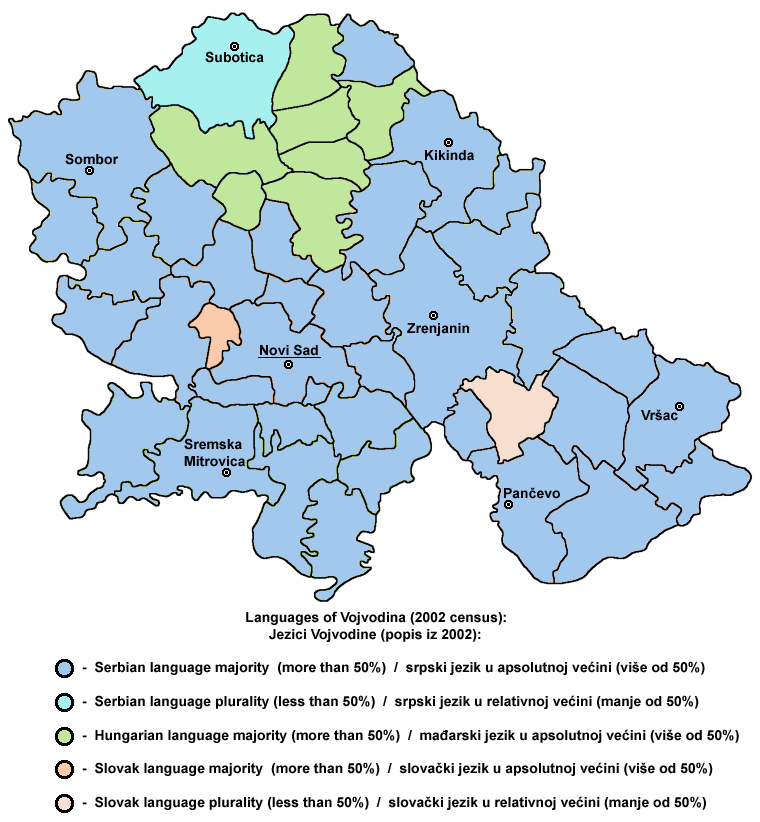
Language map of Vojvodina by municipalities, 2002
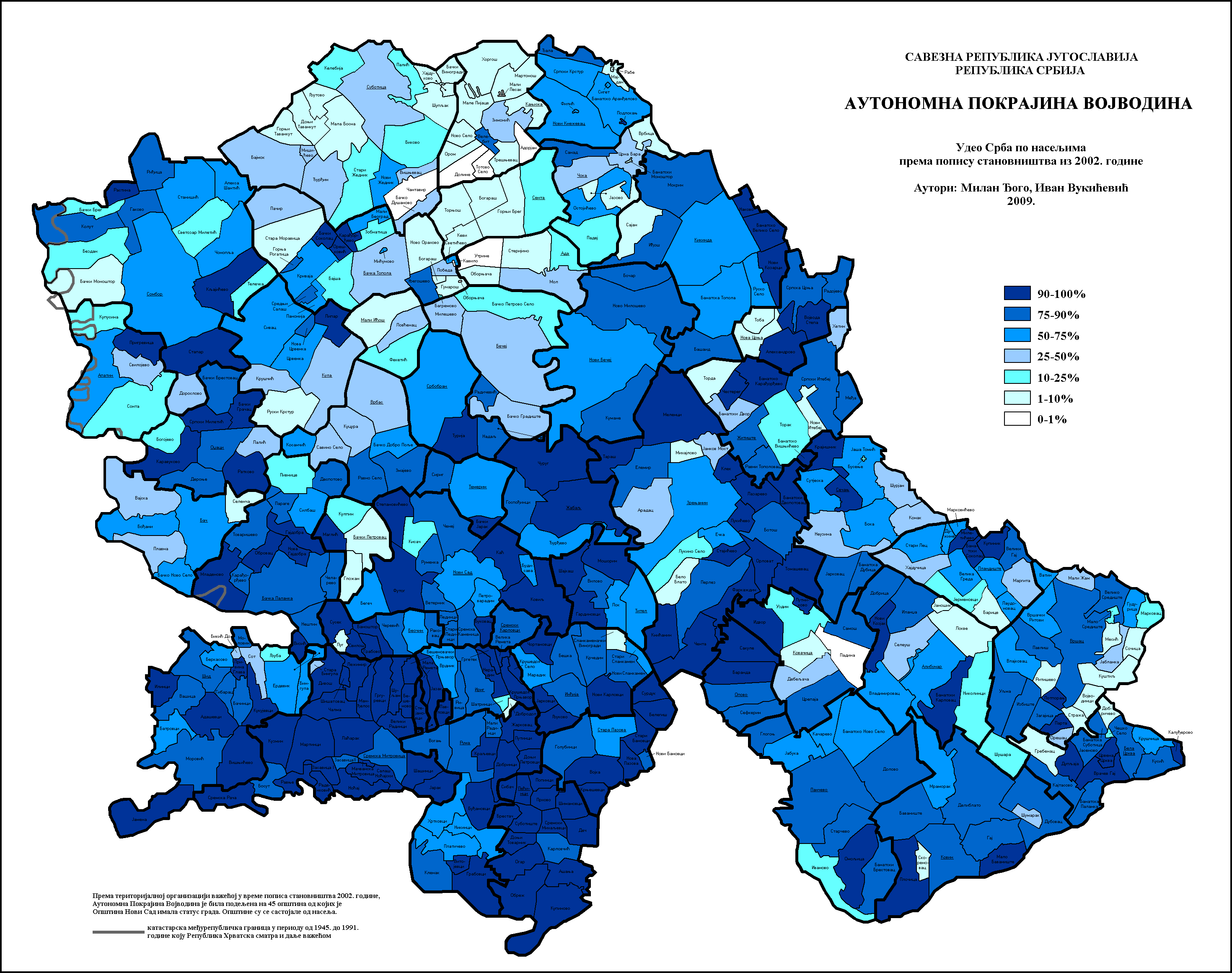
Share of Serbs in Vojvodina by settlements, 2002

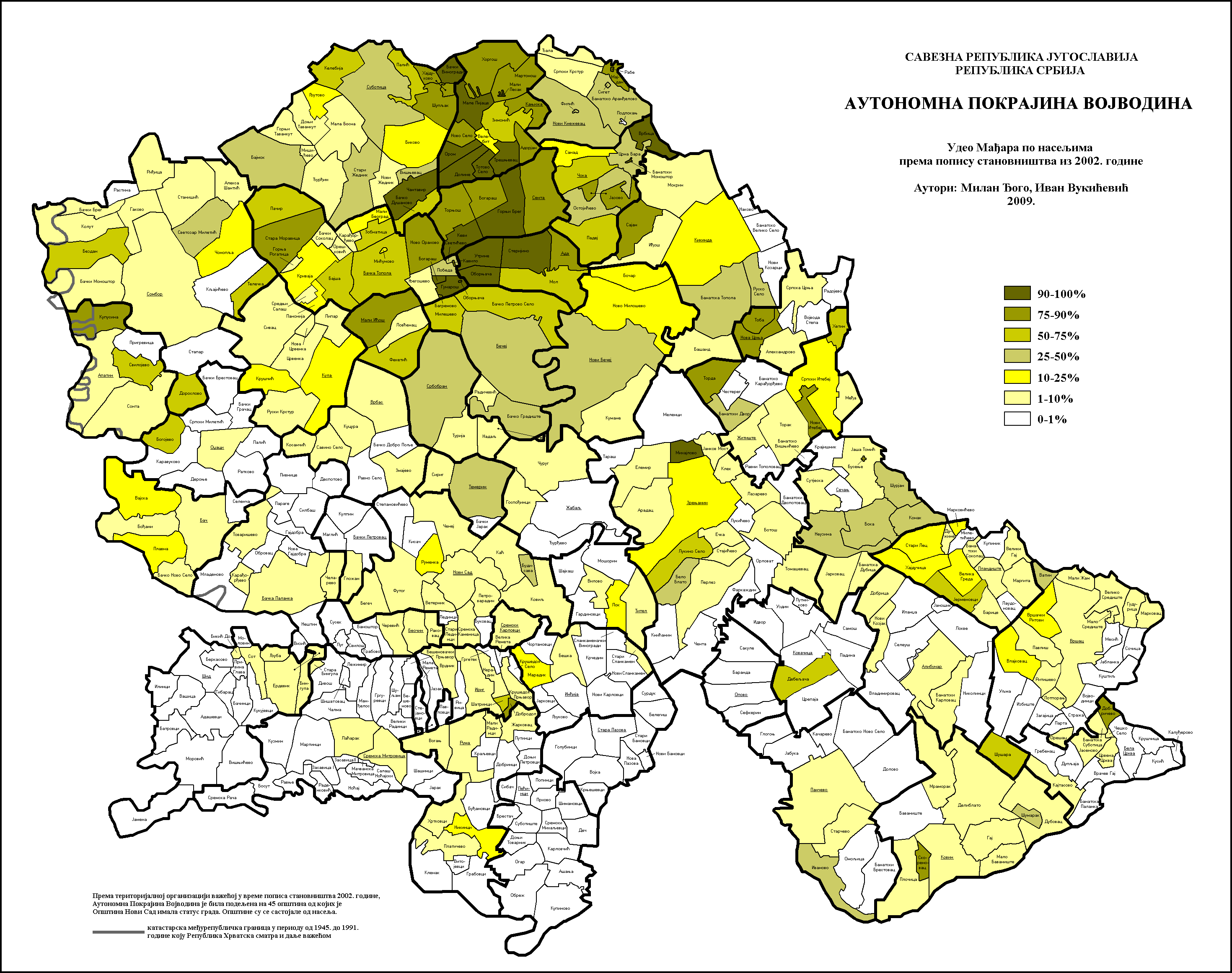
Share of Hungarians in Vojvodina by settlements, 2002

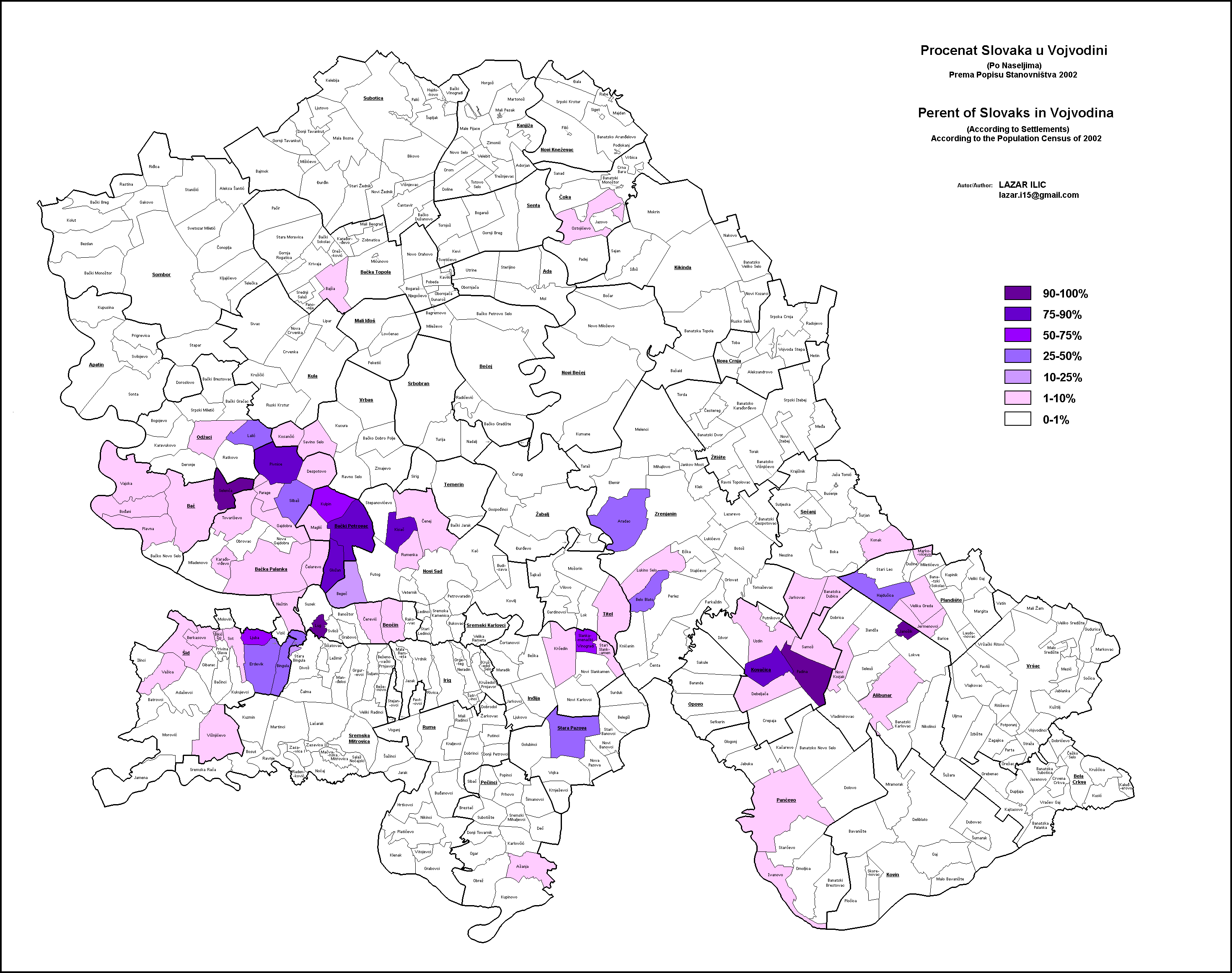
Share of Slovaks in Vojvodina by settlements, 2002
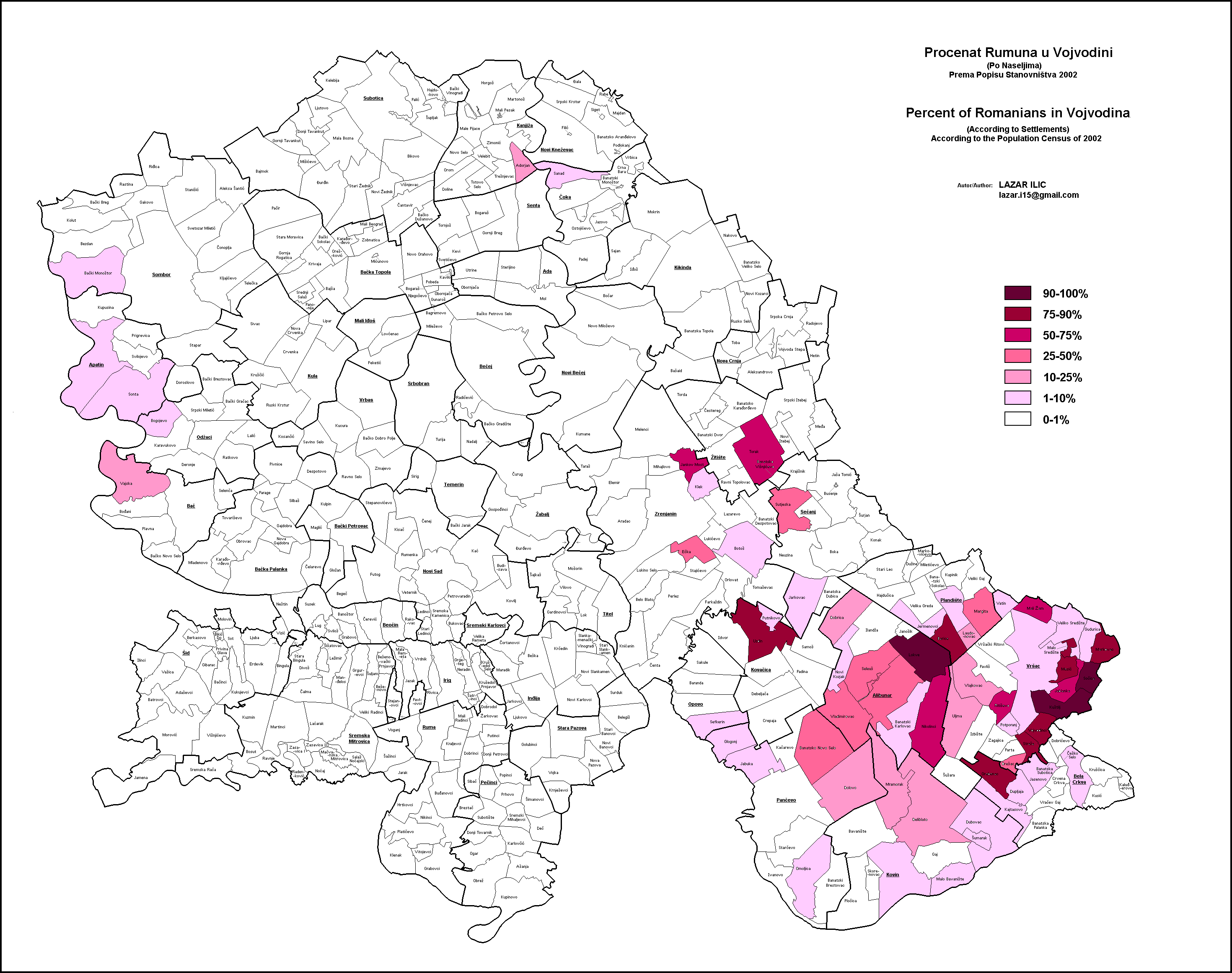
Share of Romanians in Vojvodina by settlements, 2002

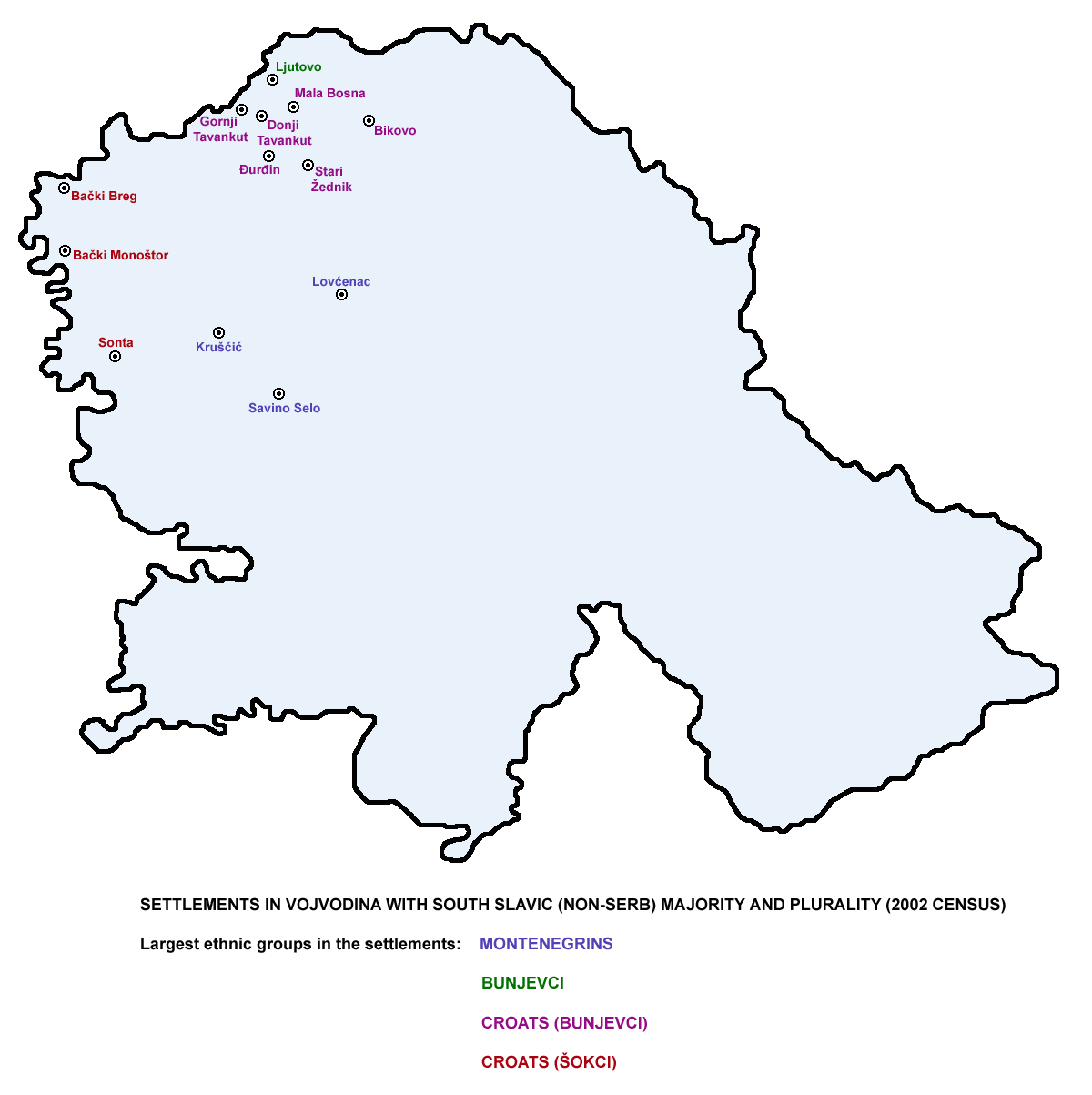
Montenegrins, Bunjevci, and Croats in Vojvodina, 2002

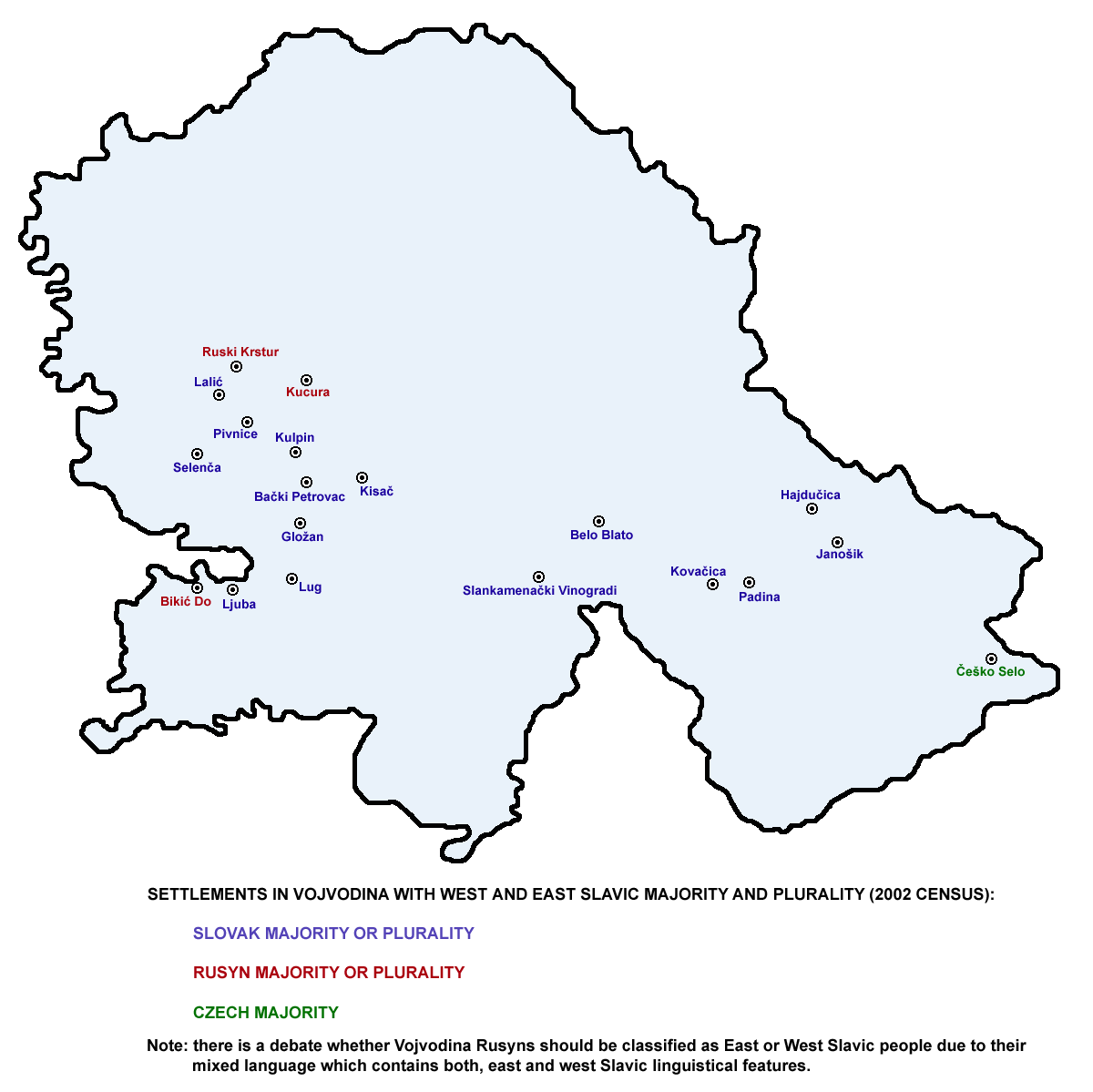
Slovaks, Rusyns, and Czechs in Vojvodina, 2002

=== 2011 ===
Ethnicity	Population	Share
Serbs	1,289,635	66.7%
Hungarians	251,136	13.0%
Slovaks	50,321	2.6%
Croats	47,033	2.4%
Roma	42,391	2.2%
Romanians	25,410	1.3%
Montenegrins	22,141	1.1%
Bunjevci	16,469	0.8%
Rusyns	13,928	0.7%
Yugoslavs	12,176	0.6%
Others	48,969	2.5%
Regional identity	28,567	1.5%
Undeclared	81,018	4.2%
Unknown	14,791	0.7%
Total	1,931,809

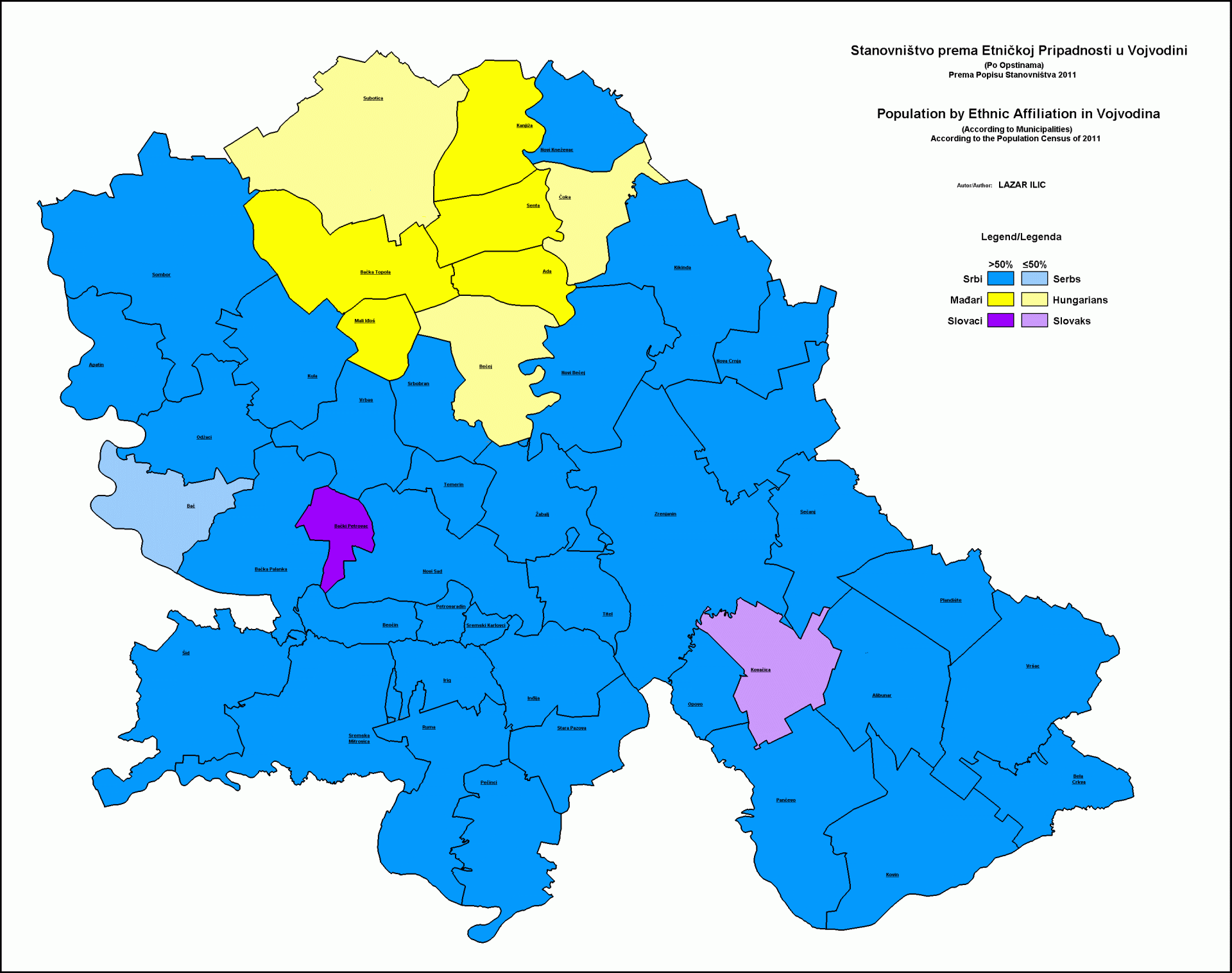
Ethnic map of Vojvodina by municipalities, 2011

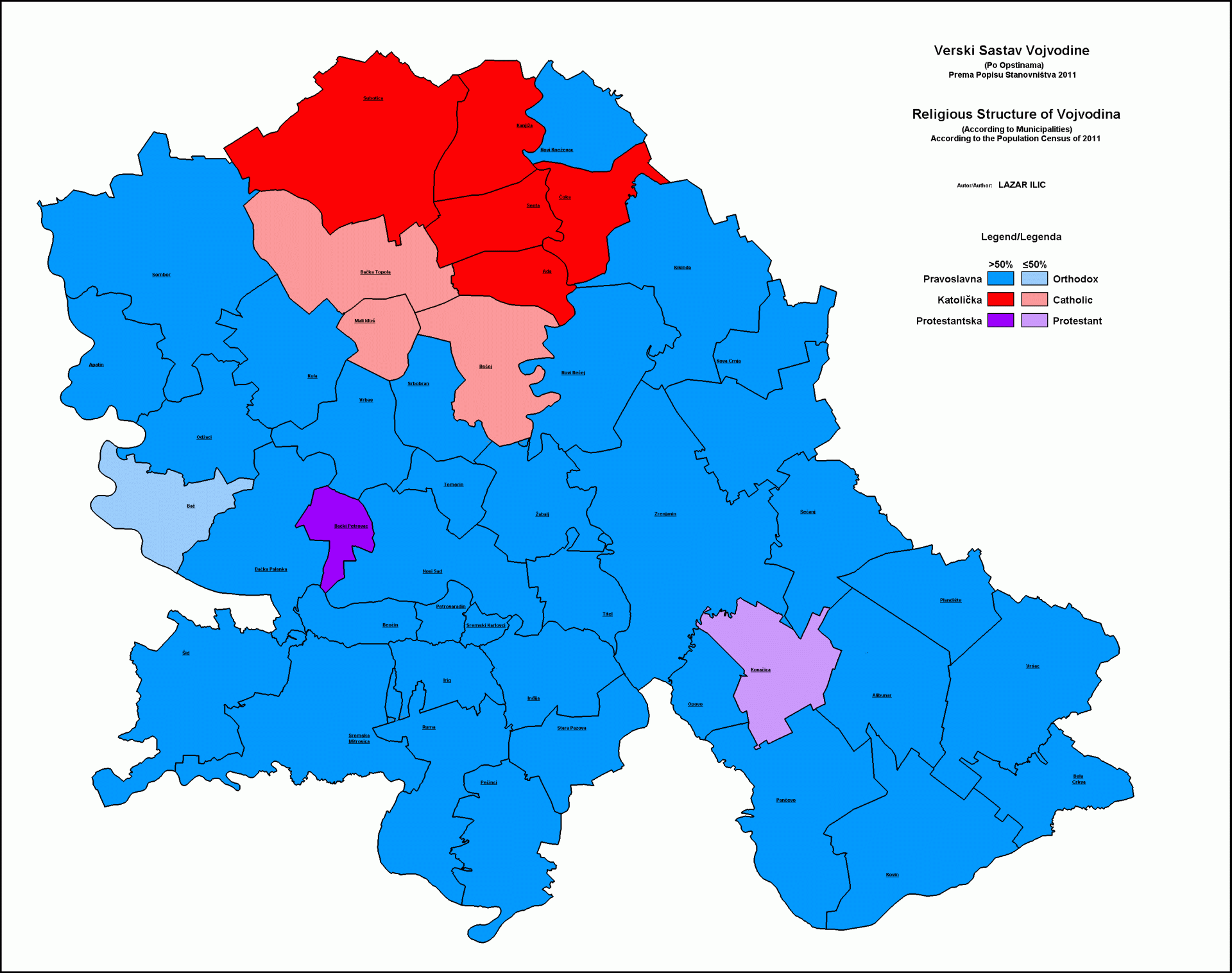
Religion map of Vojvodina by municipalities, 2011

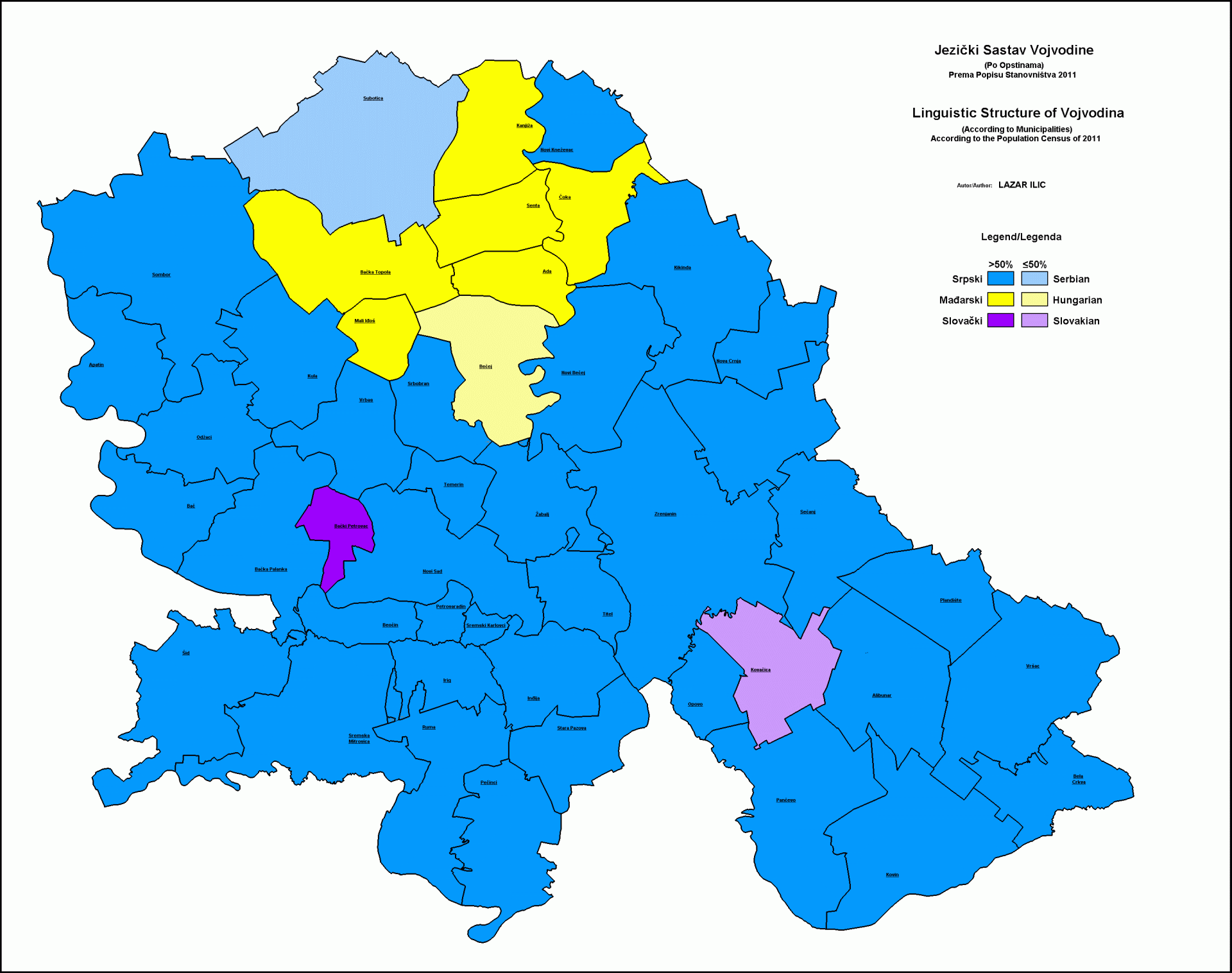
Language map of Vojvodina by municipalities, 2011

=== 2022 ===
Ethnicity	Population	Share
Serbs	1,190,785	68.4%
Hungarians	182,321	10.5%
Roma	40,938	2.3%
Slovaks	39,807	2.3%
Croats	32,684	1.9%
Romanians	19,595	1.1%
Yugoslavs	12,438	0.7%
Montenegrins	12,424	0.7%
Rusyns	11,207	0.6%
Bunjevci	10,949	0.6%
Others	33,325	1.9%
Regional identity	9,985	1.5%
Undeclared	70,339	4.2%
Unknown	73,433	4.2%
Total	1,740,230

== See also ==
- Demographic history of Serbia
- Demographic history of Bačka
- Demographic history of Serbian Banat
- Demographic history of Syrmia
- Demographic history of Novi Sad
- Demographic history of Subotica
- Ethnic groups in Vojvodina

== Sources ==
- Popović, Dušan J. (1957). Srbi u Vojvodini (1): Od najstarijih vremena do Karlovačkog mira 1699. Matica srpska.
- Popović, Dušan J. (1959). Srbi u Vojvodini (2): Od Karlovačkog mira 1699 do Temišvarskog sabora. Matica srpska.
- Popović, Dušan J. (1963). Srbi u Vojvodini (3): Od Temišvarskog sabora do Blagoveštenskog sabora 1861. Matica srpska.
- Branislav Bukurov; Bačka, Banat i Srem; Novi Sad; 1978.
- Milan Tutorov; Banatska rapsodija – istorika Zrenjanina i Banata; Novi Sad; 2001.
- Borislav Jankulov; Pregled kolonizacije Vojvodine u XVIII i XIX veku; Novi Sad – Pančevo; 2003.
- Károly Kocsis (DSc, University of Miskolc) – Zsolt Bottlik (PhD, Budapest University) – Patrik Tátrai: Etnikai térfolyamatok a Kárpát-medence határon túli régióiban + CD (for detailed data), Magyar Tudományos Akadémia (Hungarian Academy of Sciences) – Földrajtudományi Kutatóintézet (Academy of Geographical Studies); Budapest; 2006.; ISBN 963-9545-10-4 (data for 1495–1857)
