= Demographic history of Syrmia =

This article is about demographic history of Syrmia.

== Prehistory ==
Between 3000 BC and 2400 BC, Syrmia was a core area of Indo-European Vučedol culture.

== 6th-7th century ==
In 6th-7th century, Syrmia was populated by Slavs. According to other sources, it was also populated by Gepids, and Avars.

== 11th-12th centuries ==
In the 11th and 12th centuries, according to Hungarian sources, the region of Syrmia had partially Slavic and partially mixed Slavic-Hungarian population. Around 1154, Al-Idrisi, a Muslim geographer, described Manđelos as a rich town, whose inhabitants pursued a rather "nomadic way of life". By some opinions, Idrisi might have referred simply to stock-breeding that played an important role among the Hungarian inhabitants of the entire region of Syrmia This fact was confirmed later by several Byzantine authors in the 12th century (Ioannes Kinnamos, Niketas Choniates, Patriarch Michael).

== 1437 ==
In 1437, the largest part of Syrmia was populated by Serbs, according to Serbian scholars. According to other sources Hungarians and Serbs lived mixed in this area in 1437.

== 1495 ==
In 1495, the area of Syrmia had a mixed population of Croats, Hungarians, and Serbs.

== 1857 ==
According to the census from 1857, 59.4% of population of the part of Syrmia under civil administration and 63.2% of population of the part of Syrmia under military administration (Petrovaradin regiment) were ethnic Serbs. The second largest ethnic group were Croats, while other ethnic groups included Germans, Hungarians, etc.

== 1910 ==
According to the 1910 census, the population of the Syrmia region (Syrmia county) numbered 414,234 inhabitants, including:

- Serbian language = 183,109 (44.2%)
- Croatian language = 106,198 (25.6%)
- German language = 68,086 (16.4%)
- Hungarian language = 29,522 (7.1%)
- Slovak language = 13,841 (3.3%)
- Rusyn language = 4,642 (1.1%)

== 1931 ==
According to the 1931 census, the territory of Syrmia included:

- Serbs = 210,000 (48%)
- Croats = 117,000 (26.7%)
- Germans = 68,300 (15.6%)
- Hungarians = 21,300 (4.9%)
- Slovaks = 15,300 (3.5%)
- Ukrainians = 5,300 (1.2%)

== 1971 ==
Serbian part of Syrmia

According to the 1971 census, the territory of Serbian part of Syrmia had a population of 313,926 inhabitants, composed of:

- Serbs = 228,609 (72.8%)
- Croats = 38,389 (12.2%)
- Slovaks = 14,056 (4.5%)
- Hungarians = 9,376 (3%)
- Yugoslavs = 9,086 (2.9%)
- Rusyns = 3,403 (1.1%)

== 2011 ==
Serbian part of Syrmia

According to the 2011 census in Serbia, the territory of Serbian part of Syrmia had a population of 370,114 inhabitants, composed of:

- Serbs = 310,376 (83.7%)
- Croats = 11,445 (3.1%)
- Slovaks = 9,216 (2.5%)
- Roma = 6,984 (1.9%)
- Hungarians = 4,901 (1.3%)

Croatian part of Syrmia

According to the 2011 census in Croatia, the territory of Croatian part of Syrmia (the Vukovar-Srijem county) had a population of 179,521 inhabitants, composed of:

- Croats = 142,135 (79.1%)
- Serbs = 27,824 (15.5%)
- Hungarians = 1,696 (0.9%)
- Rusyns = 1,427 (0.8%)
- Slovaks = 1,185 (0.6%)

== 2022 ==
Serbian part of Syrmia

According to the 2022 census in Serbia, the territory of Serbian part of Syrmia had a population of 339,881 inhabitants, composed of:

- Serbs = 282,630 (83.5%)
- Croats = 7,547 (2.2%)
- Slovaks = 7,100 (2.1%)
- Roma = 6,870 (2%)
- Hungarians = 3,868 (1.1%)

Note: figures above include data for municipalities of Beočin and Sremski Karlovci, as well as parts of City of Novi Sad and municipality of Bačka Palanka that are geographically part of Syrmia but are administratively part of the South Bačka District; but don't include data for City of Belgrade's municipalities of New Belgrade, Zemun, and Surčin, that are geographically part of Syrmia.

Croatian part of Syrmia

According to the 2021 census in Croatia, the territory of Croatian part of Syrmia (the Vukovar-Srijem county), had a population of 143,113 inhabitants, composed of:

- Croats = 116,847 (81.6%)
- Serbs = 19,309 (13.5%)
- Hungarians = 1,180 (0.8%)
- Rusyns = 965 (0.6%)
- Slovaks = 842 (0.6%)

== See also ==
- Demographic history of Vojvodina
