= Demographic history of Subotica =

Demographics of the city of Subotica, Vojvodina, Serbia

This article is about demographic history of Subotica.

== Overview ==
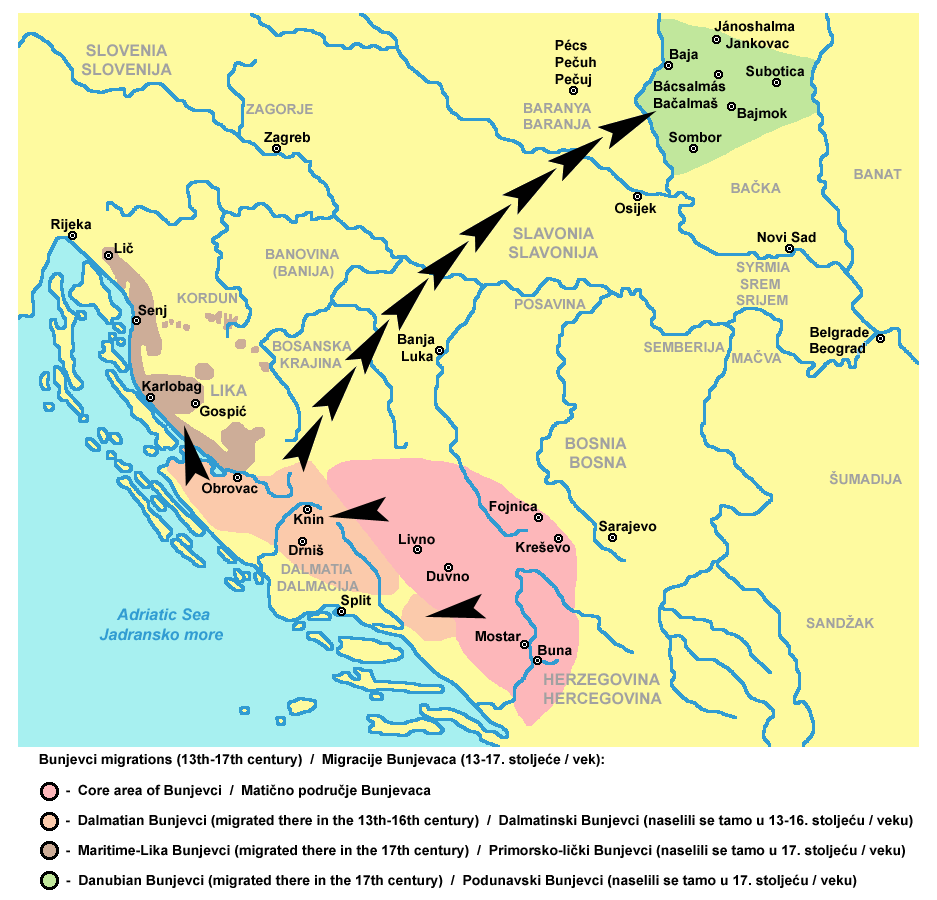
Bunjevci migration to Bačka

Before the Ottoman conquest in the 16th century, the population of the city was mostly Hungarian, while during the Ottoman rule (16th-17th centuries) was mostly Serbian and Muslim. Between the end of the 17th century and the second half of the 19th century, the population of Subotica was mostly composed of ethnic Bunjevci.

| Year | Population |
|---|---|
| 1702 | 1,969 |
| 1720 | 2,200 |
| 1765 | 9,556 |
| 1766 | 9,730 |
| 1770 | 9,840 |
| 1771 | 10,252 |
| 1772 | 10,364 |
| 1778 | 21,471 |
| 1785 | 23,000 |
| 1786 | 24,000 |
| 1836 | 32,984 |
| 1850 | 48,126 |
| 1869 | 57,556 |
| 1880 | 62,556 |
| 1890 | 74,250 |
| 1900 | 82,835 |
| 1910 | 93,232 |
| 1921 | 90,961 |
| 1931 | 100,058 |
| 1948 | 63,079 |
| 1953 | 66,091 |
| 1961 | 75,036 |
| 1971 | 88,813 |
| 1981 | 100,516 |
| 1991 | 100,386 |
| 2002 | 99,981 |
| 2011 | 97,910 |
| 2022 | 88,752 |

At the end of the 19th century, and the first decades of the 20th century, the census results show that speakers of the Hungarian language were more numerous than the speakers of the Bunjevac language. However, it is not certain whether Hungarians or Bunjevci were majority in the city at this time. Censuses performed in the Kingdom of Hungary during this time are considered partially inaccurate by many historians because these censuses did not record the population by ethnic origin or strictly by mother tongue, but also by the "most frequently spoken language", thus the census results overstated the number of Hungarian speakers, since this was official language at the time and many non-Hungarian native speakers stated that they most frequently speak Hungarian language in everyday communication. The Magyarization (Hungarization) policy of the Hungarian government also played a role, since numerous Bunjevci were Magyarized, that is, replaced their native South Slavic language with Hungarian. Part of the Bunjevac population was also bilingual, thus, the different results in Austro-Hungarian censuses before 1918 and Yugoslav censuses after 1918 are explained by the fact that it was a same bilingual population that in Austro-Hungarian censuses declared Hungarian language and in Yugoslav censuses declared Serbian or Croatian language.

Censuses performed in the Kingdom of Yugoslavia between the two world wars indicate that the majority in Subotica at this time were Bunjevci. According to the Yugoslav historians, this further undermine the validity of the results from previous censuses performed in the Kingdom of Hungary, and suggest that even during that time the majority of the city population were Bunjevci, who declared that they most frequently speak Hungarian language in everyday communication. According to the Hungarian historians, the 1931 census may be more accurate than those performed immediately after the creation of Yugoslavia (1919, 1921), which show exceptionally low figures for Hungarians at a time when the new Yugoslav authorities had political reasons to minimise the Hungarian population share.

The Hungarian census from 1941 (whose validity is rejected by many historians), show that 59.9% of the city population spoke Hungarian language, i.e. the number of Hungarian speakers increased for about 20,000 (from 41,401 (or 41.38%) in 1931 to 61,581 (or 59.9%) in 1941). The subsequent censuses performed in the SFR Yugoslavia recorded the ethnicity of the citizens, and according to the 1953 census ethnic Hungarians numbered 32,194 or 50.6% of population of Subotica. Next censuses also recorded that Hungarians are largest ethnic group in the city, but their participation dropped: 50.02% in 1961, 48.49% in 1971, 43.84% in 1981, 39.6% in 1991, and 34.99% in 2002.

In censuses conducted in SFRY ethnic Bunjevci were not allowed to express their ethnicity, and citizens who declared themselves in census as Bunjevci were counted as "Croats". Since 1991 census, Bunjevci and Croats are listed separately in census results.

According to 1850 data, Subotica had a population of 48,126 people. Before the First World War this number almost reached 100,000. When Subotica became part of the Kingdom of Serbs, Croats and Slovenes in 1918, Subotica was the third-largest city of the newly formed country, after Belgrade and Zagreb. It has since been overtaken by many cities in the region.

Since the 2002 censuses in Romania and Serbia, Subotica has become the largest city outside Hungary in which Hungarians are the largest ethnic group, although they are not absolute, but only relative majority with participation of 34.99%, while 55.94% of the city population are various South Slavic ethnic groups, which speak Serbian or Croatian language.

== Habsburg Empire and Austria-Hungary ==
=== 1720 ===
According to 1720 census, Subotica had 264 houses with more than 2,200 inhabitants. Population was mostly composed of Bunjevci and Serbs, while census also recorded data that only 2 ethnic Hungarians lived in the town, one of them was frontiersman and another one was blacksmith. (Source: Etnolingvistička i istorijska istraživanja o Bunjevcima, Zbornik radova sa naučnog skupa održanog 25. oktobra 2008. godine u Subotici, Matica Srpska, Novi Sad, 2008, pages 24–25)

=== 1743 ===
In 1743, population of Subotica included 2/3 Dalmatians (Bunjevci) and 1/3 Rascians (Serbs). (Source: Seoske crkve i groblja u Vojvodini, Novi Sad, 2000, page 6)

=== 1748 ===
In 1748, there was 562 houses in Subotica, of whom majority Bunjevac. Citizens of Orthodox faith (Serbs) lived in 58 houses, while Hungarians lived in 48 houses. (Source: Etnolingvistička i istorijska istraživanja o Bunjevcima, Zbornik radova sa naučnog skupa održanog 25. oktobra 2008. godine u Subotici, Matica Srpska, Novi Sad, 2008, pages 24–25)

=== 1778 ===
In 1778, population of Subotica numbered 21,471 inhabitants, of whom 17,043 were Bunjevci and Serbs. (Source: Etnolingvistička i istorijska istraživanja o Bunjevcima, Zbornik radova sa naučnog skupa održanog 25. oktobra 2008. godine u Subotici, Matica Srpska, Novi Sad, 2008, pages 24–25)

=== 1786 ===
In 1786, Subotica had more than 24,000 inhabitants, of whom, apart from majority Bunjevci, there was 1/4 Serbs and 1/8 Hungarians. (Source: Dr Dušan J. Popović, Srbi u Vojvodini, knjiga 2, Novi Sad, 1990, page 322)

=== 1868 ===
According to Bunjevački kalendar for 1868, ethnic composition of Subotica in this year looked like this:

- Bunjevci = 50,000
- Hungarians = 6,000
- Serbs = 3,500
- Jews = 1,300
- Others (including Danube Swabian Germans, etc.)

=== 1880 ===
In 1880, 31,592 (or 50.5%) citizens of Subotica spoke Hungarian language.

=== 1890 ===
According to 1890 census, linguistic composition was as follows:

- Hungarian language = 38,327
- Rac language = 31,824 (including Serbian, Bunjevac, and Šokac)
- German language = 1,898
- Slovak language = 476
- Slovenian language = 64
- Croatian language = 19
- Romanian language = 16
- Rusyn language = 2
- other languages = 111

=== 1910 ===
According to 1910 census, linguistic composition was as follows:

- Hungarian = 55,587 (58.7%)
- Bunjevac = 33,247 (35.1%)
- Serbian = 3,514 (3.7%)
- German = 1,913 (2%)
- Slovak = 100
- Romanian = 60
- Croatian = 39
- Rusyn language = 7
- other languages

== Yugoslavia and Serbia ==
=== 1919 ===
According to 1919 census, ethnic composition was as follows:

- Bunjevci = 65,135
- Hungarians = 19,870
- Serbs = 8,737
- Germans (Danube Swabians) = 4,251
- Jews = 3,293

=== 1921 ===
According to 1921 census, linguistic composition was as follows:

- Serbian or Croatian language = 60,700
- Hungarian = 26,750
- German = 2,470

=== 1931 ===
According to 1931 census, linguistic composition was as follows:

- Serbian or Croatian language = 53,484 (53.4%)
- Hungarian = 41,401 (41.4%)
- German = 2,865 (2.8%)

=== 1941 ===
In 1941, 61,581 (or 59.9%) citizens of Subotica spoke Hungarian language.

=== 1953 ===
In 1953, 32,194 (or 50.6%) citizens of Subotica were of Hungarian ethnicity.

=== 1961 ===
According to 1961 census, Subotica had 75,036 inhabitants, composed of:

- Hungarians = 37,529 (50.%)
- Croats = 25,735 (34.3%)
- Serbs = 9,437 (12.6%)

=== 1971 ===
According to 1971 census, Subotica had 88,813 inhabitants, composed of:

- Hungarians = 43,068 (48.5%)
- Croats = 27,109 (30.5%)
- Serbs = 11,728 (13.2%)
- Yugoslavs = 3,975 (4.5%)

=== 1981 ===
According to 1981 census, Subotica had 100,516 inhabitants, composed of:

- Hungarians = 44,065 (43.8%)
- Croats = 19,838 (19.7%)
- Serbs = 13,959 (13.9%)
- Yugoslavs = 13,772 (13.7%)
- Montenegrins = 1,119 (1.1%)

=== 1991 ===
According to 1991 census, Subotica had 100,386 inhabitants, composed of:

- Hungarians = 39,749 (39.6%)
- Yugoslavs = 17,454 (17.4%)
- Serbs = 15,734 (15.6%)
- Bunjevci = 10,874 (10.8%)
- Croats = 10,683 (10.6%)
- Montenegrins = 1,434 (1.4%)

=== 2002 ===
According to 2002 census, Subotica had 99,981 inhabitants, composed of:

- Hungarians = 34,983 (35%)
- Serbs = 26,242 (26.2%)
- Bunjevci = 10,870 (10.8%)
- Croats = 10,424 (10.4%)
- Yugoslavs = 6,787 (6.8%)
- Montenegrins = 1,596 (1.6%)
- Roma = 1,171 (1.1%)

=== 2011 ===
According to 2011 census, Subotica had 97,910 inhabitants, composed of:

- Hungarians = 34,511 (32.6%)
- Serbs = 31,558 (29.8%)
- Croats = 9,698 (9.2%)
- Bunjevci = 9,236 (8.7%)
- Yugoslavs = 2,728 (2.6%)
- Roma = 2,586 (2.4%)
- others

=== 2022 ===
According to 2022 census, Subotica had 88,752 inhabitants, composed of:

- Serbs = 32,360 (34.3%)
- Hungarians = 24,687 (26.2%)
- Croats = 6,997 (7.4%)
- Bunjevci = 6,146 (6.5%)
- Roma = 2,888 (3%)
- Yugoslavs = 1,850 (1.9%)
- others

== See also ==
- Demographic history of Bačka
- Demographic history of Vojvodina
- Demographic history of Serbia
