= Palace of the Republic, Banja Luka =

Official building in Banja Luka (Bosnia)

Palace of the Republic
- Палата Републике
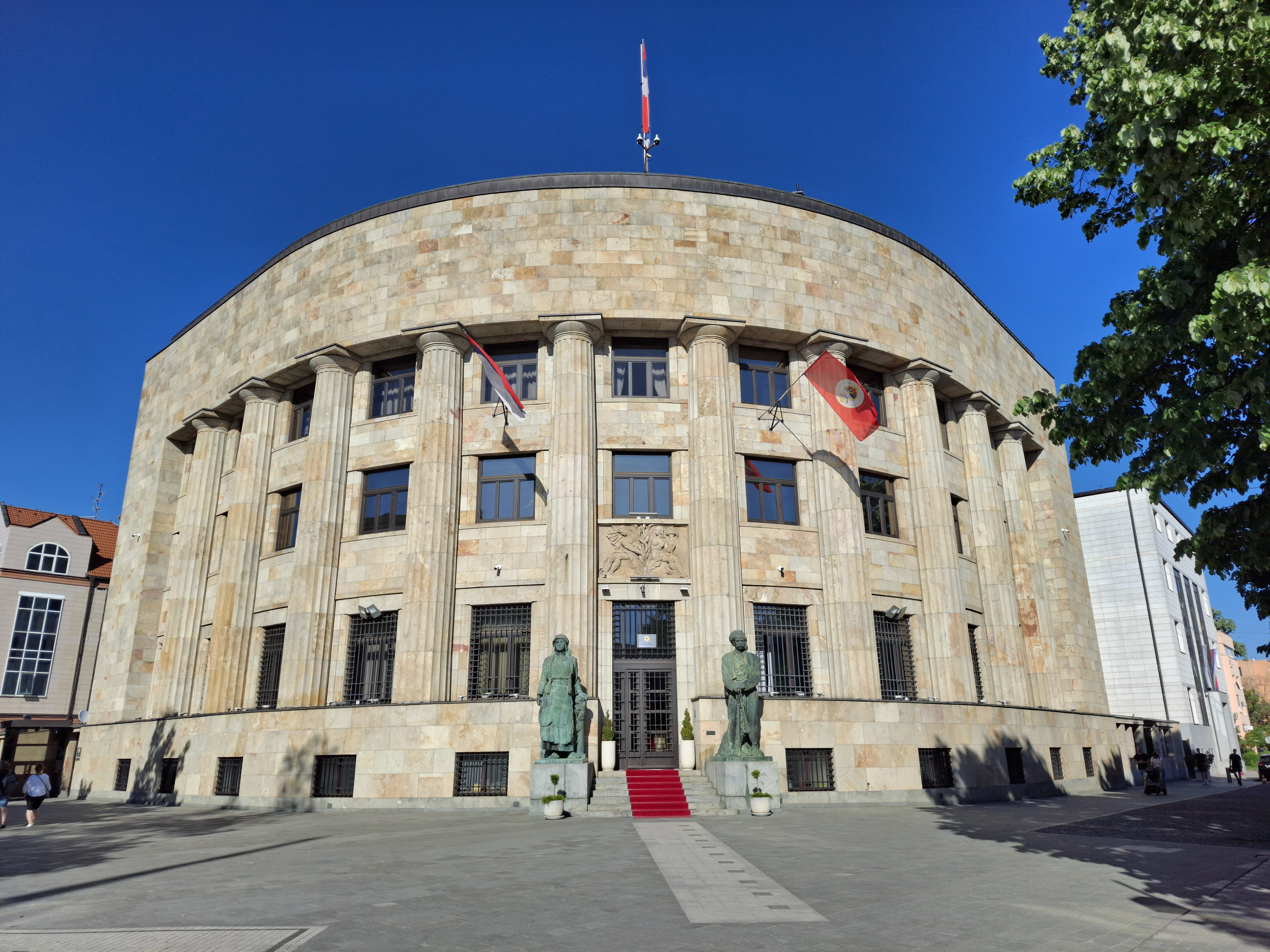
- The Palace of the Republic

- Location within Republika Srpska
- Former names: Zgrada Hipotekarne banke
- Alternative names: "Palata predsjednika", formerly also known as "SDK"

General information
- Status: Used as presidential residence
- Type: Parliamentary building
- Location: Banja Luka, Republika Srpska, Bosnia and Herzegovina
- Coordinates: 44°46′21.1″N 17°11′34.6″E
- Completed: 1936
- Inaugurated: December 27, 1936; April 24, 2008 as residence of the president
- Renovated: 2008
- Cost: 11 million convertible marks (renovation)
- Owner: President of Republika Srpska
- Landlord: Republika Srpska

Design and construction
- Architect: Miodrag Vasić

The Palace of the Republic (Serbian: Палата Републике, Palata Republike) is the official residence of the President of Republika Srpska.

It is located in the Center of Banja Luka alongside the famous "Gospodska" street near the Cathedral of Christ the Saviour, Banski Dvor and City Assembly building. During its existence it was the seat of several state institutions mainly linked with the economy.

== History ==
After the rule of ban Svetislav Milosavljević, Banja Luka was a partially modernized city in Vrbas Banovina and Kingdom of Yugoslavia. After him on rule comes ban Bogoljub Kujundžić and during his rule this building was constructed. Building of banks and other buildings of economic value for a country that tries to be stable in that manner was very important. Beside the crisis in that time caused by Wall Street crash on "Black Thursday" 1929, Yugoslavian rule continued to fight against that crisis and put the country back on its feet. In Banja Luka already some important buildings were finished during that time and some of them are: building of Hygienical Institute (today Public Healthcare Institute), City Bridge (or Patra bridge), Home of Poors (Uboški dom) (today Secondary School Center) and so on. Also some private banks went bankrupt and that was an opportunity for strong state banks.

For all of these reasons, a situation for construction of one state bank building developed. The State Mortgage Bank of Yugoslavia decided to open one building in a relatively undeveloped region of country so it could get more trust in people and secure its capital, which was big at that time.

Eighth bank under State Mortgage Bank was opened in Banja Luka on October 14, 1934. Place of that building was few hundred meters far from place where later building was constructed. The bank immediately after opening of its branch in Banja Luka started procedure for construction its own building.

=== Construction and period of the Kingdom of Yugoslavia ===
For plans of constructing was engaged architect Miodrag Vasić from Belgrade who projected all plans in very short time and during the construction he didn't leave Banja Luka to monitor all works till the end. In the beginning of June 1936 first stonemasons come to Banja Luka to finish facade of the building putting heavy carved stones brought from Macedonia. In same time last works in interior were in progress.

Before the end of that year on December 27, 1936 the building was opened and inaugurated. On opening of the building was present also that-time minister of finance Dušan Letica in the government of Milan Stojadinović. Something interesting is that the building was blessed by Serb Orthodox metropolite Vasilije Popović and Effendi Hamdija Softić according to Christian Orthodox and Muslim customs. About that event it is written:

There was ceremonial opening and blessing. As it was a tradition, which we haven't renounced till today, there was a lot of speakers and present people cheered to the young king, House of Karađorđević, royal regents, prime minister Stojadinović... The band of the 33rd Infantry Regiment two time played the national anthem.

In first day of 1937 former Agency of the State Mortgage Bank became Main bank branch for Vrbas Banovina.

On April 24, 1937 statues of two Krajina peasants were placed in front of the building entrance. Statues are work of Vladimir Petrovič Zagorodnjuk. Both figures are made of bronze, dressed in traditional Krajina clothing with ornaments from Zmijanje. Every figure is representation people and some activities – trade (male figure with turban, stick and weighing scale with sack full of goods positioned on right side) and household (female figure with sickle in right hand). Both figures have weight of 600 kg each and they are made in Belgrade.

Also 11 reliefs on facade are work of Vladimir Petrovič Zagorodnjuk and drawings of that reliefs were made by Stepan Fedorovič Kolesnikov. Of those 11 only one above the entrance left untouched. Đorđe Petraš created the look of building's facade.

=== World War II and period of Communist Yugoslavia ===
During World War II Banja Luka fell under the Independent State of Croatia. Building of Mortgage Bank was used as some kind of commanding building. During 2nd Banja Luka Operation building was partially destroyed by new "patent" of Yugoslav Partisans – pouring the gasoline in firefighter pump and in that way shooting on building. Reliefs were removed of the building and were kept on attic of the building for a bit of time when they were for all times destroyed.

After the war when Bosnia and Herzegovina become a member of the Socialist Federal Republic of Yugoslavia, the building was used for purposes of People's Bank. In the 1960s there was a branch of the State Bookkeeping Service (Služba državnog knjigovodstva, abbreviated SDK) which stayed until the War in Bosnia and Herzegovina in 1992. This place was place of meetings of youth in that period.

== Modern period and presidential residence ==
After the civil war in this building were National Bank of Republika Srpska, Ministry of Finance of Republika Srpska and later Development bank.

From September 2002 it is on the Temporary list of national monuments of Bosnia and Herzegovina.

The Government of Republika Srpska gave on use this building to the president in 2007. After reconstruction that costed 11 million convertible marks (about 5.5 million €) on April 24, 2008 it becomes residence of the President of Republika Srpska replacing previous Banski Dvor and first president that was resident was Rajko Kuzmanović. Beside the president residents of the palace were Vicepresidents of Republika Srpska, other presidential organs and Serb member of the Presidency of Bosnia and Herzegovina. Today is one of the most secured buildings in Banja Luka by the units of the Administration for protecting persons and objects of the Police of Republika Srpska.

== Gallery ==
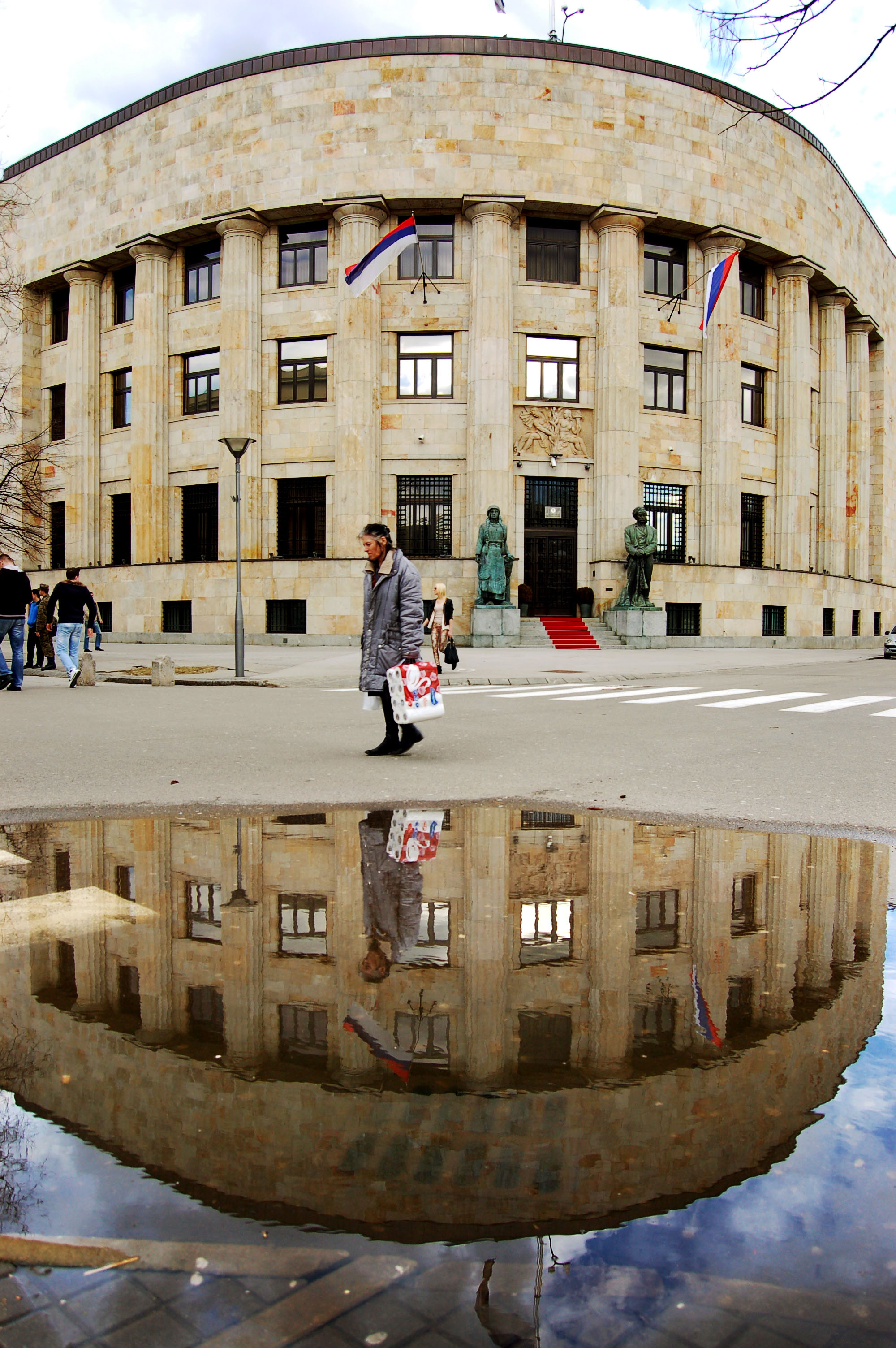
View from Gospodska street

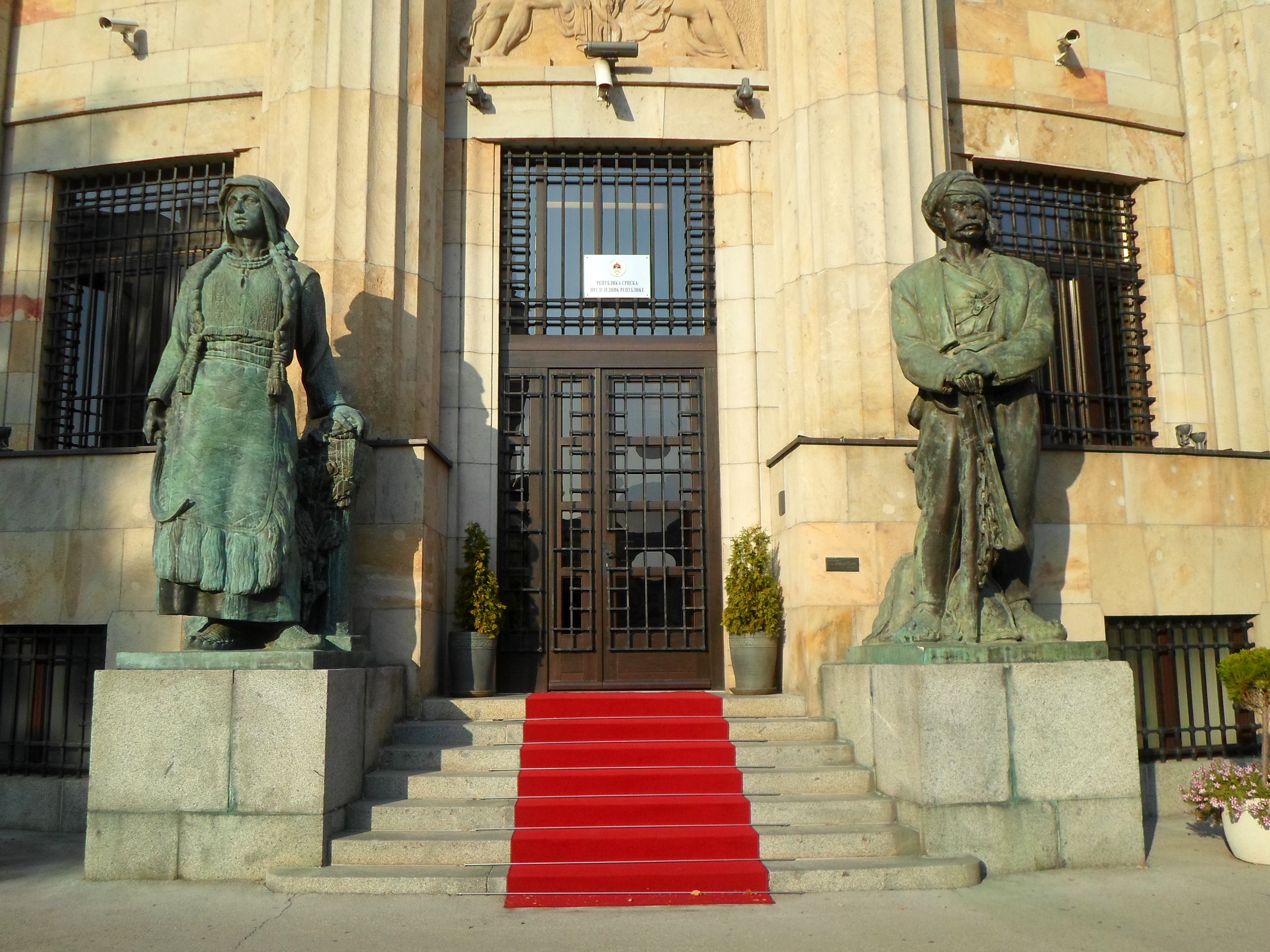
Entrance in the building with statues of two Krajina peasants

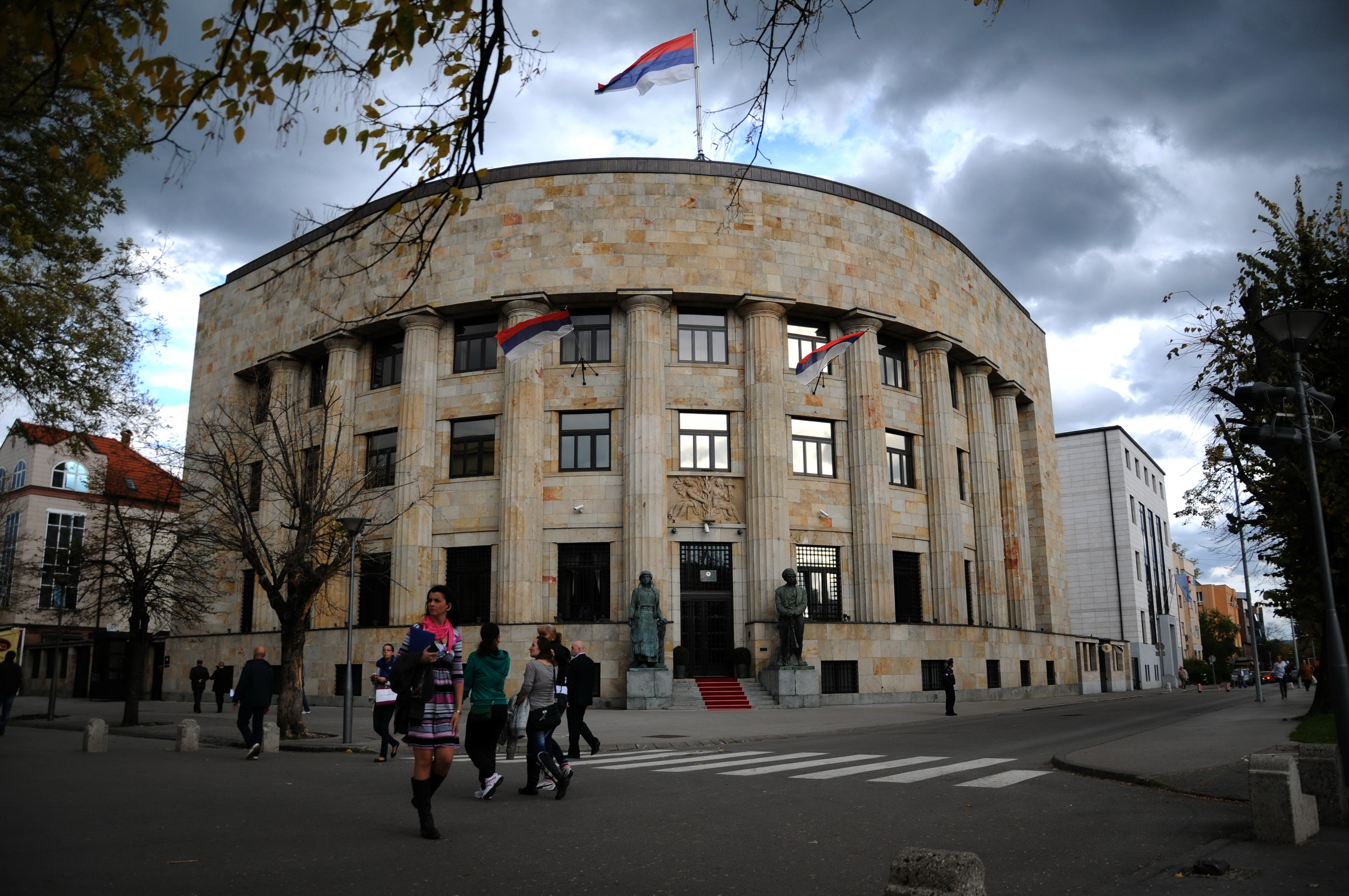
View from Gospodska street

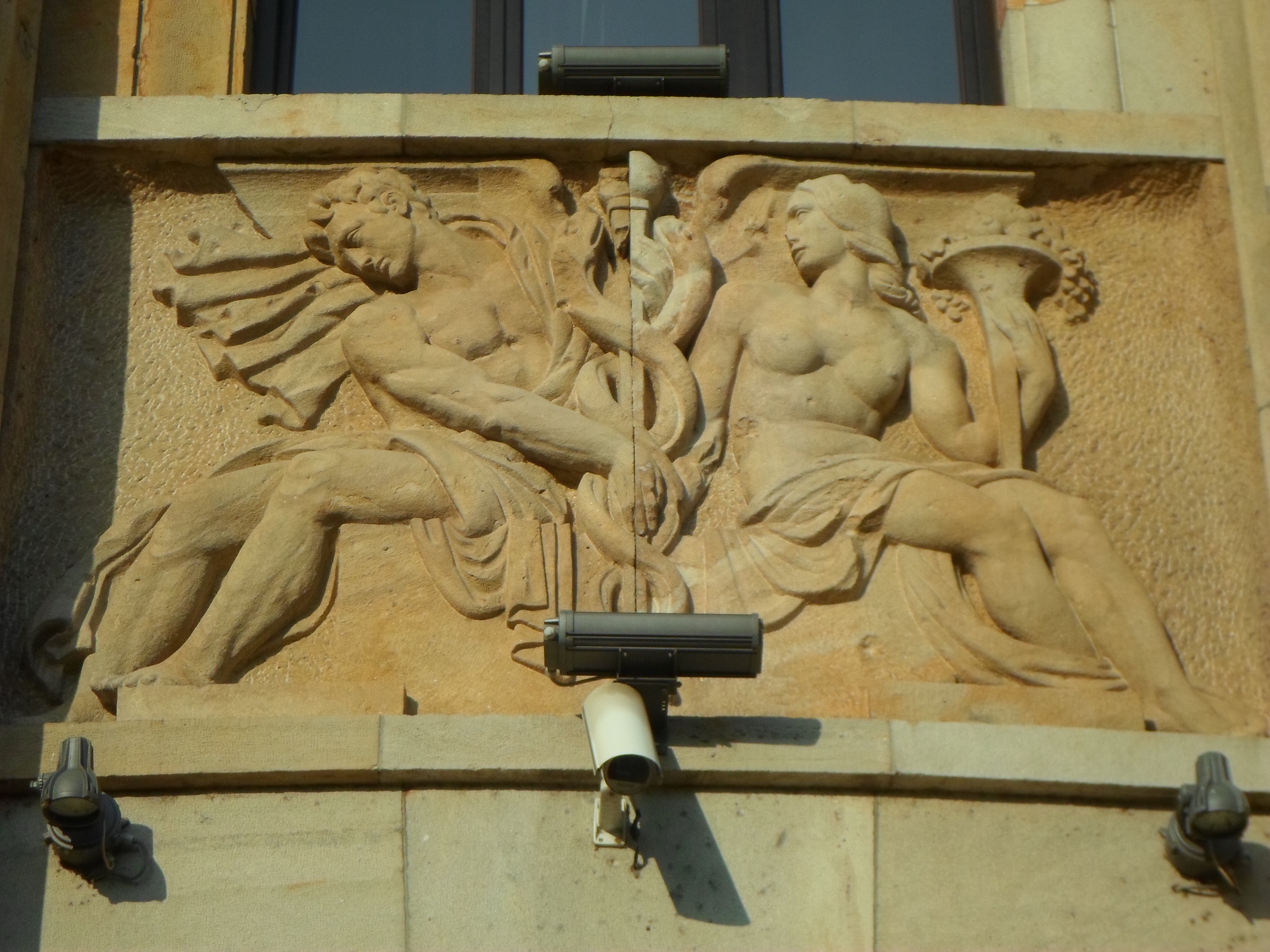
Relief on facade

== See also ==
- Svetislav Milosavljević
- President of Republika Srpska
