= Banat (disambiguation) =

Banat is a geographical and historical region of southeastern Europe.

Banat may also refer to:

== Places ==
- Banat, India, a town in Uttar Pradesh
- Banat, Iran, a village in Kerman Province, Iran
- Eparchy of Banat, a diocese or eparchy of the Serbian Orthodox Church in the Banat region, Serbia
- Banat, Michigan, a village in the United States

=== Historical ===
- Banate of Severin, a Hungarian province that existed between the 13th and the 16th centuries
- Banate of Lugos and Karánsebes, a Hungarian province that existed in the 16th century
- Banat of Craiova, a Habsburg province that existed between 1718 and 1739
- Banat of Temeswar, a Habsburg province that existed between 1718 and 1778
- Voivodeship of Serbia and Temes Banat, a voivodship (duchy) of the Austrian Empire that existed between 1849 and 1860
- Banat Republic, a short-lived state, proclaimed in Timișoara in 1918
- Banat, Bačka and Baranja, a de facto province of the Kingdom of Serbia and the Kingdom of Serbs, Croats and Slovenes between 1918 and 1919
- Banat (1941–1944), an autonomous region within the German-administered Territory of the Military Commander in Serbia between 1941 and 1944

== Other uses ==
- Banat Batyrova (1904–1970), Russian farmer
- Banat News, a Cebuano language tabloid in the Philippines
- Banat (film), a 2015 Italian-Romanian-Bulgarian-Macedonian drama film
- FK Banat Zrenjanin, a Serbian football club from Zrenjanin that plays in the Serbian Premier League
- Phoenix Banat Storm, an American soccer team founded in 2006

== See also ==
- Banat Bulgarians
- Banat Krajina, a section of the Habsburg Monarchy's Military Frontier in the Banat region
- Banat Swabians
- Demographic history of Serbian Banat
- Central Banat District, a district in Serbia
- North Banat District, a district in Serbia
- South Banat District, a district in Serbia
- Banate (disambiguation)
- Banatić ("Little Banat" in Serbian), a quarter of the city of Novi Sad, Serbia
