= Serbian Cultural Club =

Yugoslavian nationalist group, 1937–1941

- Српски културни клуб
- Abbreviation: SKK
- Formation: 4 February 1937
- Founded at: Belgrade
- Dissolved: 1941
- Type: NGO
- Purpose: activism
- Headquarters: Belgrade, Kingdom of Yugoslavia
- Region served: Kingdom of Yugoslavia
- Official language: Serbian
- President: Slobodan Jovanović
- Key people: Dragiša Vasić; Vaso Čubrilović

The Serbian Cultural Club (Serbian: Srpski kulturni klub, Serbian Cyrillic: Српски културни клуб; SKK) was a short-lived but influential grouping of mainly Belgrade-based Serb intellectuals of the Kingdom of Yugoslavia in the years immediately before the outbreak of World War II. The organization pushed for the advance of Serbian national interest in Yugoslavia, following Croatian autonomy (1939). After the invasion of Yugoslavia in April 1941, the president of the SKK, Slobodan Jovanović went into exile with the government, but several members remained behind in Yugoslavia and developed a Serb-centric ideological framework for the Chetniks of Draža Mihailović.

== History ==
=== Formation ===
The Serbian Cultural Club was founded in 1937 by influential Serb intellectuals of the Kingdom of Yugoslavia. Its mission was to "work on fostering Serbian culture within Yugoslavism". It explicitly stated that it was not tied to any political ideology and that people of various political directions could participate. The organization pointed out its preferential task as preservation of state unity and solving the Serbian national question, in a way which did not deny any rights of Croats and Slovenes. The pretext for its establishment was, according to the organization itself, "the increasing unequal position of Serbs in the Yugoslav state". Its motto was "a strong Serbian identity — a strong Yugoslavia".

In December 1936, a group of seventy intellectuals gathered in Belgrade and held the preparatory founding assembly of the organization to be known as the "Serbian Cultural Club" (Srpski kulturni klub, SKK). Among the founders were 23 University professors (among whom were Interwar rectors: Slobodan Jovanović, Pavle Popović, Vladimir Ćorović, Dragoslav Jovanović and Petar Mićić), ministers and assistants to ministers (Lujo Bakotić, Risto Jojić, Milan Milojević, Ljubomir Mihajlović, Spasoje Piletić and Mihailo Konstantinović), eight notable industrial and bank executives, the President of the Court of Cassation Rusomir Janković, the President of the Court of Appeal Milan Jovičić, the President of the District Court of Belgrade Miodrag Filipović, two retired generals Živko Pavlović (general) and Ljubomir Pokorni, prominent lawyers and cultural workers Dragiša Vasić, Nikola Stojanović and Mladen Žujović, famous artists, architects, doctors, engineers and tradespeople. Among them were also notable individuals of Serbian national culture, Stevan Jakovljević, Marko Car, Veselin Čajkanović and Vaso Čubrilović. Later, Milan Grol, Aleksandar Belić, Justin Popović and many other within the Serbian intellectual elite joined the organization. The first regular assembly was held on 4 February 1937 in Belgrade, during which Slobodan Jovanović (the founder of the organization) was chosen as the President of the Assembly and Board of Directors. The opening statement read that the SKK would be the meeting place and discussion forum for those interested in questions on Serbian national culture.

=== 1939–41 ===
The advent of the organization in February 1937, in Interwar Serbia and Yugoslavia, was seen in the political community as the beginning of the end of Serbian support to the Yugoslavist idea. Initially created as a policy institute for integration of Serbian culture within Yugoslavia, after the 1939 Cvetković–Maček Agreement and the consequent creation of an autonomous Croatian unit (the Banovina of Croatia), it became primarily a vehicle to advance Serbian national interest in the country. The heaviest blow of Croatian autonomy, according to the SKK leaders, was the borders of the Banovina, which left 1 million Serbs within it. In a text published in Srpski glas in 1940, it expressed its opposition to the partition. The Club saw that the only safe protection of Serbs would be the urgent establishment of a special Serbian unit. Serbian nationalists, members of the SKK, and even some Serbian members in government, planned the establishment of the Serbian Banovina (or "Serb lands"), as an answer to Croatian autonomy. According to lieutenant Staniša Kostić, several members of the SKK were founders of a conspiracy group that sought to overthrow the Yugoslav regency.

=== World War II ===
A large segment of the membership of the SKK opposed Yugoslav accession to the Tripartite Pact. During the German-led Axis invasion of Yugoslavia, Jovanović went into exile with most of the post-coup Yugoslav government, and in January 1942 he became the Prime Minister of the Yugoslav government-in-exile.

Lawyer Stevan Moljević, chairman of the Banja Luka section of the SKK prior to the outbreak of war, proposed that the Serbs should take control of all territories to which they laid claim, and from that position negotiate the form of a federally organized Yugoslavia; this Greater Serbia would consist of 65–70% of the total Yugoslav territory and population. In August 1941, Chetnik leader Draža Mihailović formed the Central National Committee (CNC), of which Moljević, Dragiša Vasić (Republican Party member and SKK Vice-President) and Mladen Žujović (also a SKK member) were the three most important members, also forming Mihailović's so-called Executive Council for much of the war. The CNC advised Mihailović on domestic and international political matters, and liaised with civilian leaders in areas of Yugoslavia where Chetnik influence was strong.

== Annotations ==
1. The native name is properly translated into Serb Cultural Club.

== Sources ==
- Djokić, Dejan; Ker-Lindsay, James (2010). New Perspectives on Yugoslavia: Key Issues and Controversies. Routledge. pp. 74–77. ISBN 978-1-136-93132-1.
- Jovičić, Miodrag (1991). Jako srpstvo — jaka Jugoslavija: izbor članaka iz Srpskog glasa, organa Srpskog kulturnog kluba, objavljenih 1939-1940. Naučna knjiga.
- Kazimirović, Vasa (1995). Srbija i Jugoslavija, 1914-1945: Srbija i Jugoslavija između dva svetska rata. Prizma. ISBN 9788670840010.
- Pavlovitch, Stevan (2004). "Serbia and Yugoslavia–the relationship". Southeast European and Black Sea Studies. 4 (1): 96–106. doi:10.1080/14683850412331321738. S2CID 153801381.
- Stijović, Milun (2004). Srpski glas. Издавачка књижарница Зорана Стојановића. ISBN 9788675430933.
- Subotić, Dragan (1998). Srpske političke stranke i pokreti u 19. i 20. veku: Političke stranke i pokreti u političkom životu međuratne Srbije (i Jugoslavije) (1918.-1941.). Primeri iz političke istorije, kulture i sociologije političkih partija. In-t za političke studije. ISBN 9788674190289.
- Tomasevich, Jozo (1975). War and Revolution in Yugoslavia, 1941–1945: The Chetniks. Stanford, California: Stanford University Press. ISBN 978-0-8047-0857-9.
- Vesović, Milan; Nikolić, Kosta (1996). Ujedinjene srpske zemlje: ravnogorski nacionalni program. Vreme Knjige.
- Vucinich, Wayne S.; Tomasevich, Jozo (1969). Contemporary Yugoslavia: Twenty Years of Socialist Experiment. University of California Press. pp. 31–. GGKEY:5JR74ERLNET.
