= Banate =

The term Banate may refer to:

== Administration ==
- A territory ruled by a ban
- An alternate term for "banovina", especially the Banovinas of the Kingdom of Yugoslavia from 1929 to 1941

== Medieval administrative areas ==
=== Today in Bosnia and Herzegovina ===
- Banate of Bosnia, de facto independent medieval Bosnian state prior to emergence of the kingdom of Bosnia
- Banate of Só, a province of the medieval Kingdom of Hungary also ruled by Banate and Kingdom of Bosnia
- Banate of Usora, a province of the medieval Kingdom of Hungary also ruled by Banate and Kingdom of Bosnia
- Banate of Jajce, after the fall of Bosnian Kingdom a province of the medieval Kingdom of Hungary
- Banate of Srebrenik, after the fall of Bosnian Kingdom a province of the medieval Kingdom of Hungary

=== Today in Bulgaria ===
- Banate of Bulgaria (1365–1369), a province of the medieval Kingdom of Hungary

=== Today in Croatia ===
- Banate of Croatia (medieval), a province of the medieval Kingdom of Hungary
- Banate of Slavonia, a province of the medieval Kingdom of Hungary

=== Today in Romania ===
- Banate of Severin, a province of the medieval Kingdom of Hungary
- Banate of Lugoj and Caransebeș, a province of the medieval Kingdom of Hungary and Principality of Transylvania
- Banate of Craiova, a province on the western part of Wallachia

=== Today in Serbia ===
- Banate of Mačva, a province of the medieval Kingdom of Hungary
- Banate of Kučevo, a province of the medieval Kingdom of Hungary
- Banate of Braničevo, a province of the medieval Kingdom of Hungary
- Banate of Belgrade, a province of the medieval Kingdom of Hungary

=== Today in Austria ===
- Banate of Leitha, was a short-lived western Hungarian state that existed in 1921

== Administrative areas of Yugoslavia 1929–1941 ==
- Banate of Danube (Dunavska banovina), 1929–1941, with the capital in Novi Sad
- Banate of Drava (Dravska banovina), 1929–1941, with the capital in Ljubljana
- Banate of Drina (Drinska banovina), 1929–1941, with the capital in Sarajevo
- Banate of Primorje (Primorska banovina), 1929–1939, with the capital in Split
- Banate of Morava (Moravska banovina), 1929–1941, with the capital in Niš
- Banate of Sava (Savska banovina), 1929–1939, with the capital in Zagreb
- Banate of Vardar (Vardarska banovina), 1929–1941, with the capital in Skopje
- Banate of Vrbas (Vrbaska banovina), 1929–1941, with the capital in Banja Luka
- Banate of Zeta (Zetska banovina), 1929–1941, with the capital in Cetinje
- Banate of Croatia (Banovina Hrvatska), 1939–1941, with the capital in Zagreb

Proposed:

- Banate of Serbia
- Banate of Slovenia

== Geography ==
- Banate, Iloilo, a municipality in the Philippines.

== Ethnology ==
- Banate or Bannock, Native American people.

== See also ==
- Banovina (disambiguation)
- Banat (disambiguation)
