= Demographic history of Bačka =

This article is about demographic history of Bačka. Data provided below are from various population censuses conducted in the region of Bačka during the history. Censuses from 1715 to 1910 contain data about population of the entire Bačka, while censuses from 1921 to 2002 contain data about population of the Yugoslav/Serbian part of Bačka.

== Historical preview ==
Before the Hungarian conquest in the 10th century, Bačka was mainly populated by Slavs and Avars. There is a dispute whether remains of ethnic Avars still lived in the region in the time of Hungarian conquest or they were already assimilated by more numerous Slavs. In the 11-15th centuries, the region had mostly Hungarian population with Slavic ethnic islands. During Hungarian rule, the native Slavic population mostly lost its Slavic language and culture and was assimilated into Hungarians. Since the 14th century, Slavic Serbs started to migrate to this region from Balkans. In the outset of the 16th century, before the Ottoman conquest, the largest part of population of Bačka were Hungarians, and the smaller part of population were Slavs. After the Ottoman conquest, most of the Hungarian and Catholic Slavic population fled from the area, and new Orthodox settlers (Serbs, Vlachs, etc.) as well as many Muslims of various ethnic origins settled in the area. During Ottoman rule, the region was mainly populated by Serbs, who were in an absolute majority and who mostly lived in villages, while cities were populated by various Muslim and Christian ethnic groups including Serbs, Turks, Roma, Greeks, Cincars, Arabs, Bosniaks, as well as Jews. During the Habsburg rule, in the 17th and 18th century, new wave of Serb settlers came to the area. During the 18th and 19th century, Hungarian, German, and other (Slovak, Rusyn, etc.) settlers were brought to the area, which thus became ethnically mixed, with a population composed mostly of Serbs, Hungarians, and Germans. Hungarian settlers mostly originated from Upper Hungary, especially from those counties that were not under Ottoman rule. There is dispute whether some of these Hungarians were descendants of pre-Ottoman Hungarian population of Bačka. When Austrians conquered Bačka and tried to determine private land ownership in the region, the only Hungarians that were able to prove that their ancestors owned land in Bačka were members of Cobor family, who proved their ownership rights over town of Baja. In the early 20th century, Bačka was ethnically mixed with relative Hungarian linguistic plurality. During the 20th century (after 1918), many South Slavic colonists from other parts of Yugoslavia (Serbs, Montenegrins, Macedonians, etc.) settled in the area, mainly after 1945 and during the 1990s.

First censuses conducted in Bačka were Ottoman tax records (defters) from 1554, 1570, and 1590. These tax records recorded only those inhabitants of Bačka that paid taxes to the Ottoman authorities, while those inhabitants that did not have to pay taxes (for example those that were in Ottoman service) were not listed in tax records. During the Habsburg administration, first censuses in Bačka were conducted in 1715 and 1720. These censuses also recorded only those inhabitants that had to pay taxes to the Habsburg authorities, while those inhabitants that did not have to pay taxes (for example those that did not have their own house) were excluded from census. These censuses did not recorded ethnicity or mother tongue of the citizens. Later Habsburg and Yugoslav censuses recorded language spoken by the citizens, and since 1948, censuses are also recording ethnicity of the inhabitants.

== Historical Bačka ==
=== 1715 ===
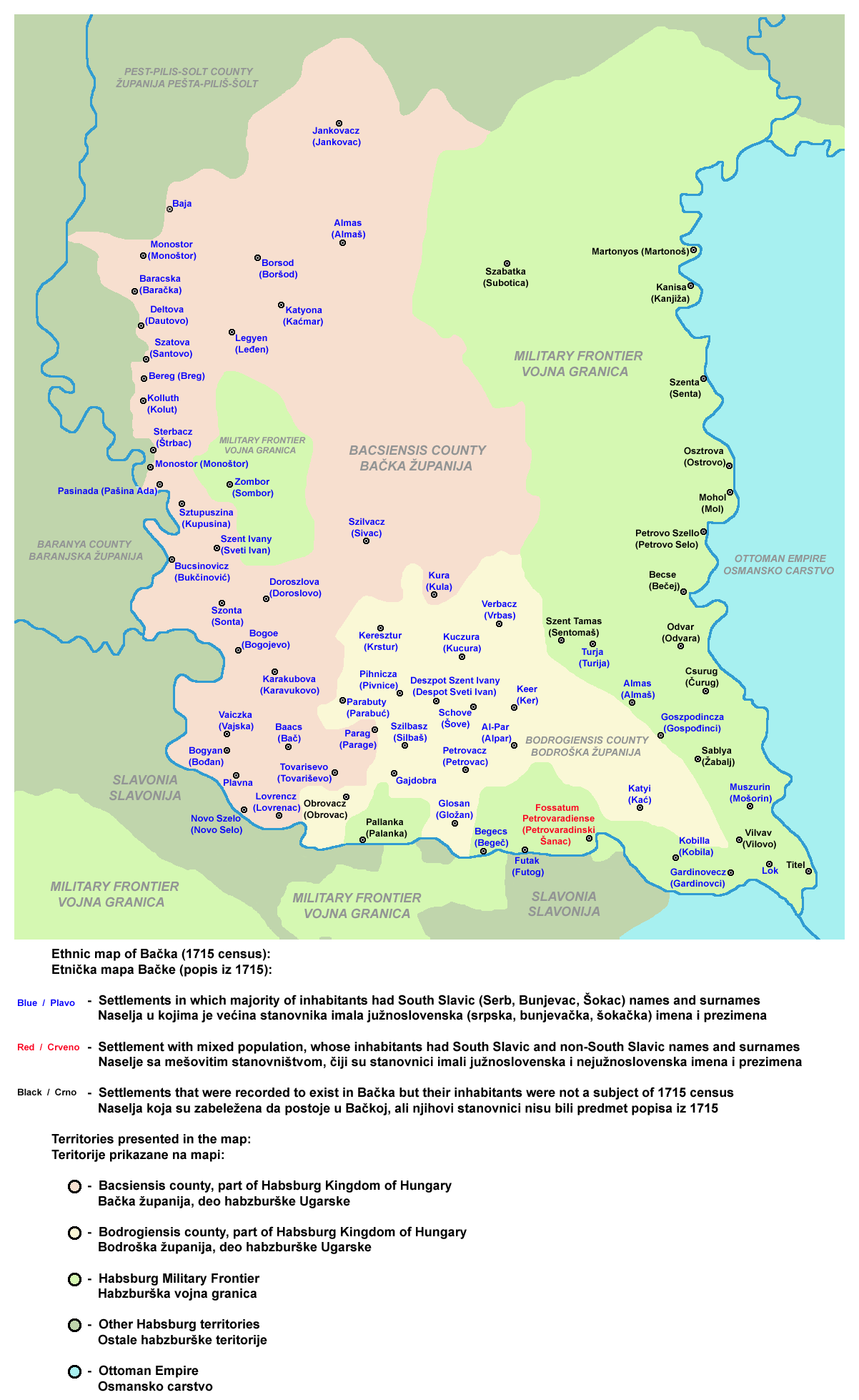
Ethnic map of Bačka, 1715

According to the Austrian 1715 census, there were 58 settlements in Bačka (excluding 18 settlements from military frontier), with largest being Baja (with 237 recorded houses) and Futog (with 137 recorded houses).

This census recorded all inhabitants of Bačka that had to pay taxes to authorities, excluding those that were not obligated to pay taxes (for example people that did not have their own house or people that served as soldiers in the military frontier) as well as those that were hiding from authorities with goal to avoid tax paying.

The 1715 census did not record ethnicity or language of the citizens, but analysis of names and surnames of the people from census results provided data about approximate ethnic composition of the area, which was as follows:

- 97.6% people with South Slavic (Serb, Bunjevac, Šokac) names and surnames
- 1.9% (or 530 people) with Hungarian names and surnames
- 0.5% people with German names and surnames

=== 1720 ===
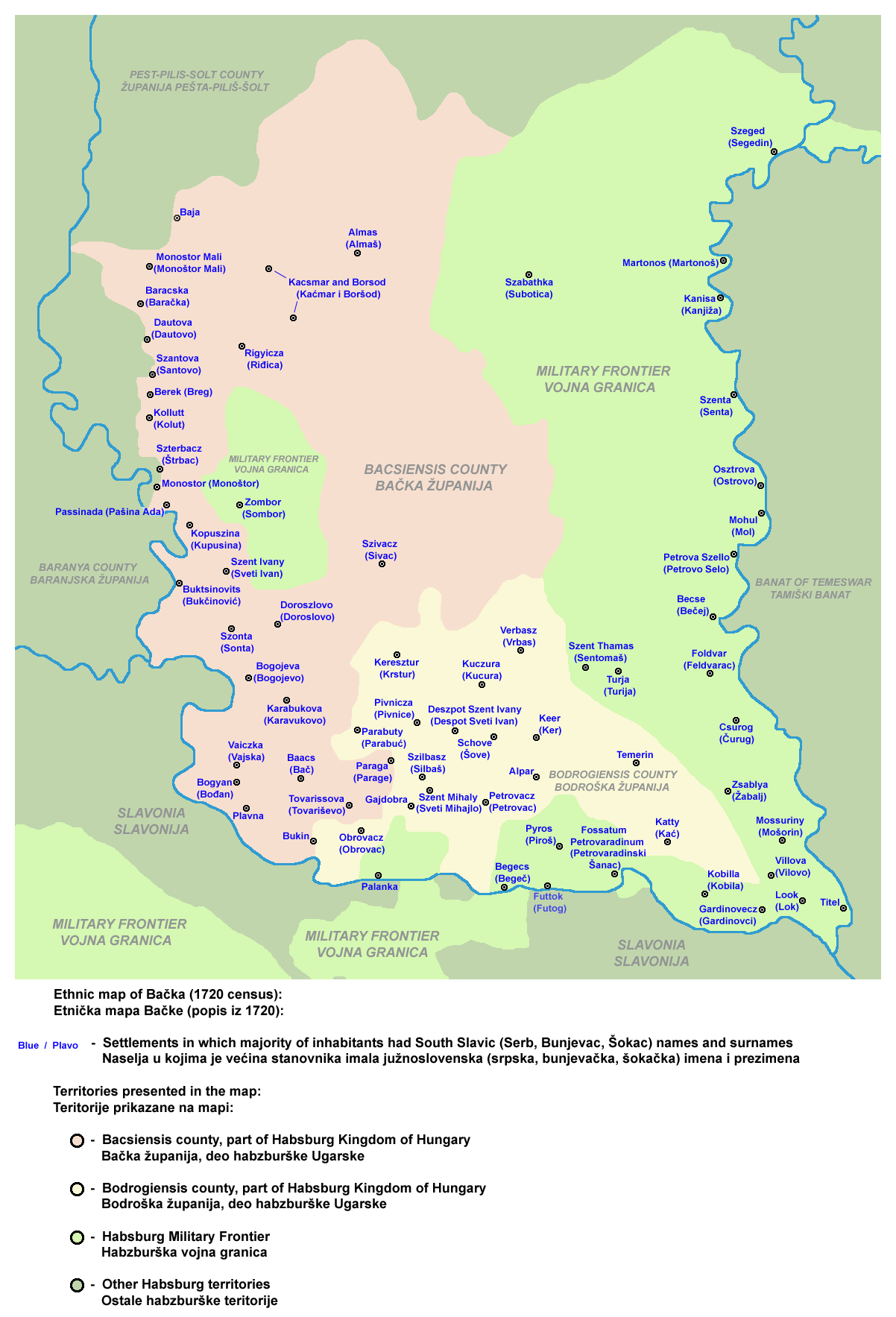
Ethnic map of Bačka, 1720

The 1720 census recorded 104,569 citizens in the Bačka region. Unlike 1715 census, it recorded inhabitants of the military frontier as well (thus, census results also include frontiersmen from the city of Szeged, who were also under jurisdiction of the military frontier).

The 1720 census did not record ethnicity or language of the citizens, but analysis of names and surnames of the people from census results provided data about approximate ethnic composition of the area, which was as follows:

- 98,000 (94%) people with South Slavic names and surnames, of which:
  - 76,000 (73%) people with Orthodox (Serb) names and surnames
  - 22,000 (21%) people with Roman Catholic (Bunjevac, and Šokac) names and surnames
- 5,019 people with Hungarian names and surnames
- 750 people with German names and surnames

=== 1820 ===
By 1820 the population of the Bacsensis-Bodrogiensis County reached 387,914 in total population, and included following ethnicities:

- South Slavs (Serbs, Bunjevci, Šokci) = 170,942 (44%)
- Hungarians = 121,688 (31%)
- Germans = 91,016 (23%)

=== 1910 ===
According to the 1910 census, Bács-Bodrog County had 812,385 inhabitants. Population by mother language (1910 census):

- Hungarian language = 363,518 (44.7%)
- German language = 190,697 (23.4%)
- Serbian language = 145,063 (17.8%)
- Slovak language = 30,137
- Rusyn language = 10,760
- Croatian language = 1,279
- Romanian language = 386
- other languages = 70,545 (including Bunjevac and Šokac dialects)

As for the geographical distribution of the three largest ethnic groups in 1910, Hungarians mainly lived in northern parts of the region, Germans in western, and Serbs in the southern parts. Novi Sad, city in the southern part of the region, was the cultural and political centre of the Serb people in the 18th and 19th century. After the end of the World War I, the territory of the county was divided between the Kingdom of Serbs, Croats, and Slovenes (Yugoslavia) and Hungary.

== Yugoslav/Serbian Bačka ==
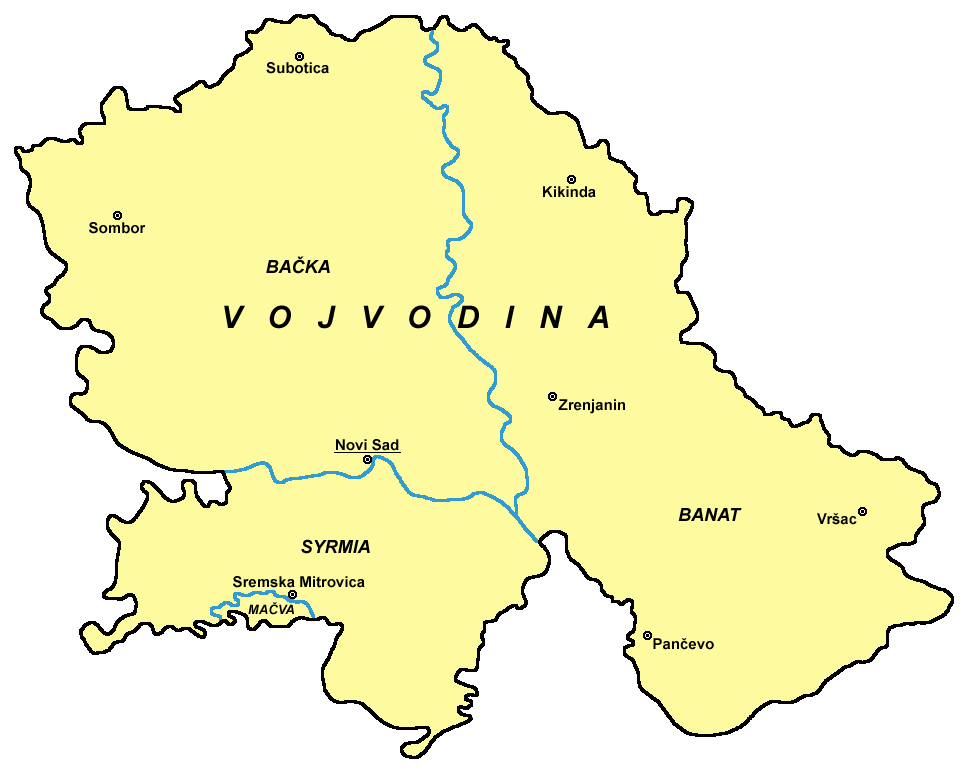
Serbian Bačka within province of Vojvodina

=== 1921 ===
According to the 1921 census, Yugoslav part of Bačka had a population of 735,117 inhabitants, composed of:

- Hungarian language = 260,998 (35.5%)
- Serbian language and Croatian language = 246,598 (33.5%)
- German language = 173,796 (23.6%)
- Slovak language = 30,993 (4.2%)
- Rusyn language = 10,999 (1.5%)
- Slovene language = 4,850 (0.6%)

Of the 105 communes in the Yugoslav Bačka, the Germans were in a majority in 36, the South Slavs in 31, the Magyars in 23, and the Slovaks in 7, while in 8 communes no one language-group predominated. Of the eleven administrative districts into which the Yugoslav Bačka was divided, the German-speaking communes were in a majority in Odžaci and Palanka, the Serb and Croat in Žabalj and Titel, and the Hungarian in Senta and Bačka Topola. In the remaining five districts, the communes of no single language group were in predominance.

=== 1931 ===
According to the 1931 census, Yugoslav part of Bačka had a population of 784,896 inhabitants, composed of:

- Serbian language and Croatian language = 284,865 (36.3%)
- Hungarian language = 268,711 (34.2%)
- German language = 169,858 (21.6%)
- Slovak language = 34,234 (4.3%)
- Rusyn language = 11,414 (1.4%)

=== 1941 ===
According to Hungarian census from end of 1941, Yugoslav Bačka had a population of 789,705 inhabitants, composed of:

- Hungarian language = 358,531 (45.4%)
- German language = 162,070 (20.5%)
- Serbian language = 151,269 (19.1%)
- Croatian language = 62,303 (7.9%)
- Slovak language = 32,578 (4.1%)
- Rusyn language = 13,829 (1.7%)

=== 1948 ===
According to the 1948 census, Yugoslav Bačka had a population of 807,122 inhabitants, composed of:

- Hungarians = 307,343 (38%)
- Serbs = 303,664 (37.6%)
- Croats = 88,491 (11%)
- Slovaks = 36,041 (4.4%)
- Rusyns = 17,269 (2.2%)
- Germans = 10,638 (1.3%)

=== 1953 ===
According to the 1953 census, Yugoslav part of Bačka had a population of 831,945 inhabitants, composed of:

- Serbs = 317,247 (38.1%)
- Hungarians = 311,146 (37.4%)
- Croats = 80,957 (9.7%)
- Slovaks = 36,424 (4.4%)
- Rusyns = 18,162 (2.2%)

=== 1961 ===
According to the 1961 census, Yugoslav part of Bačka had a population of 920,600 inhabitants, composed of:

- Serbs = 386,385 (41.1%)
- Hungarians = 320,566 (34.8%)
- Croats = 101,509 (11%)
- Slovaks = 37,665 (4.1%)

=== 1971 ===
According to the 1971 census, Yugoslav part of Bačka had a population of 960,001 inhabitants, composed of:

- Serbs = 413,895 (43.1%)
- Hungarians = 311,379 (32.4%)
- Croats = 92,207 (9.6%)
- Slovaks = 36,508 (3.8%)
- Montenegrins = 31,120 (3.2%)
- Yugoslavs = 27,651 (2.9%)
- Rusyns = 16,580 (1.7%)

=== 1981 ===
According to the 1981 census, Yugoslav part of Bačka had a population of 1,012,112 inhabitants, composed of:

- Serbs = 434,178 (40.9%)
- Hungarians = 287,565 (30.3%)
- Yugoslavs = 91,757 (9.8%)
- Croats = 71,793 (7.1%)
- Slovaks = 34,997 (3%)
- Rusyns = 16,020 (1.7%)

=== 1991 ===
According to the 1991 census, Yugoslav part of Bačka had a population of 1,007,179 inhabitants, composed of:

- Serbs = 463,029 (46.1%)
- Hungarians = 258,724 (26.6%)
- Yugoslavs = 98,052 (10.2%)
- Croats = 65,663 (6.7%)
- Slovaks = 32,092 (3.3%)
- Rusyns = 14,895 (1.1%)

=== 2002 ===
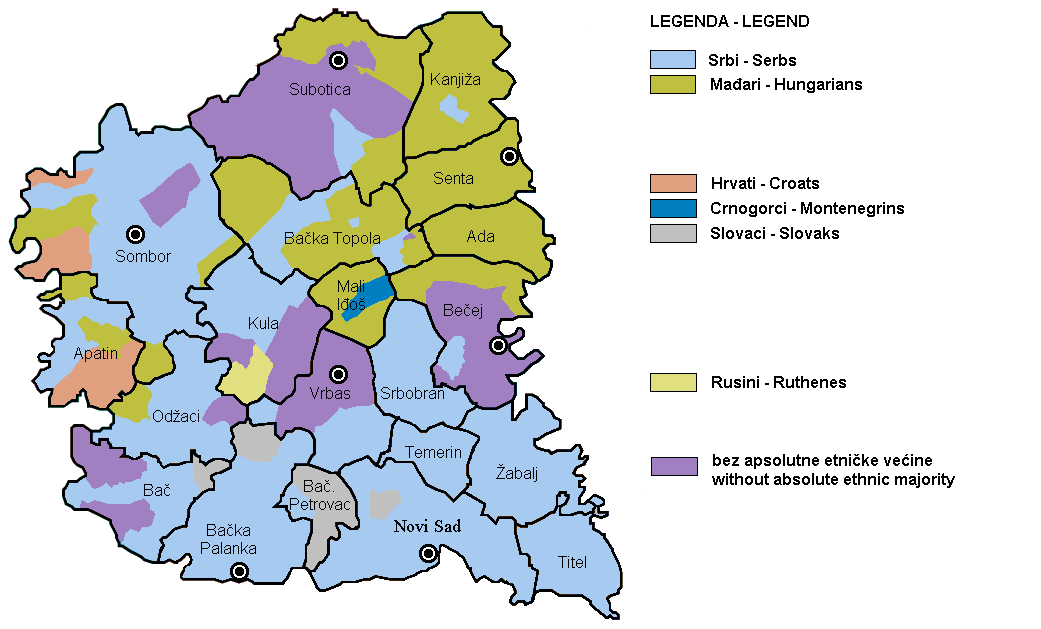
Ethnic map of Serbian Bačka in 2002

According to the 2002 census, Serbian part of Bačka had a population of 1,022,524 inhabitants, composed of:

- Serbs = 559,700 (54.7%)
- Hungarians = 221,882 (21.7%)
- others (Croats, Slovaks, Bunjevci, Rusyns, Montenegrins, Yugoslavs, Roma, etc.)

=== 2011 ===
According to the 2011 census, Serbian part of Bačka had a population of 1,026,315 inhabitants, composed of:

- Serbs = 580,805 (56.6%)
- Hungarians = 193,343 (18.8%)
- Croats = 32,951 (3.2%)
- Slovaks = 25,042 (2.4%)
- Montenegrins = 19,831 (1.9%)
- Roma = 16,860 (1.6%)
- Bunjevci = 16,324 (1.6%)
- Rusyns = 11,916 (1.1%)

=== 2022 ===
According to the 2022 census, Serbian part of Bačka has a population of 915,885 inhabitants, composed of:

- Serbs = 559,213 (61%)
- Hungarians = 143,259 (15.6%)
- Croats = 23,407 (2.5%)
- Slovaks = 20,023 (2.2%)
- Roma = 16,993 (1.8%)
- Montenegrins = 11,231 (1.2%)
- Bunjevci = 10,859 (1.2%)
- Rusyns = 9,671 (1%)

Note: figures above include data for municipalities of Ada, Kanjiža, and Senta, that are geographically part of Bačka (although administratively part of North Banat District), but don't include data for municipalities of Beočin and Sremski Karlovci, as well as parts of City of Novi Sad and municipality of Bačka Palanka that are geographically part of Syrmia (although administratively part of South Bačka District).

== Hungarian Bácska ==
According to 2022 census in Hungary, in Hungarian Bácska (including districts of Baja, Bácsalmás, and Jánoshalma) had population of 101,881 inhabitants. The vast majority of the population of Hungarian Bácska are ethnic Hungarians.

Note: administrative borders of the districts do not fully correspond with the geographical borders of Hungarian Bácska.

== See also ==
- Demographic history of Serbian Banat
- Demographic history of Vojvodina
