= Banski dvor =

Banski dvor may refer to:

- Banski dvor (Banja Luka), a government building in Bosnia and Herzegovina
- Banski dvor (Novi Sad), a government building in Serbia

== See also ==
- Banski dvori, a government building in Zagreb, Croatia
- Banovina (disambiguation)
