= Banovina of Serbia =

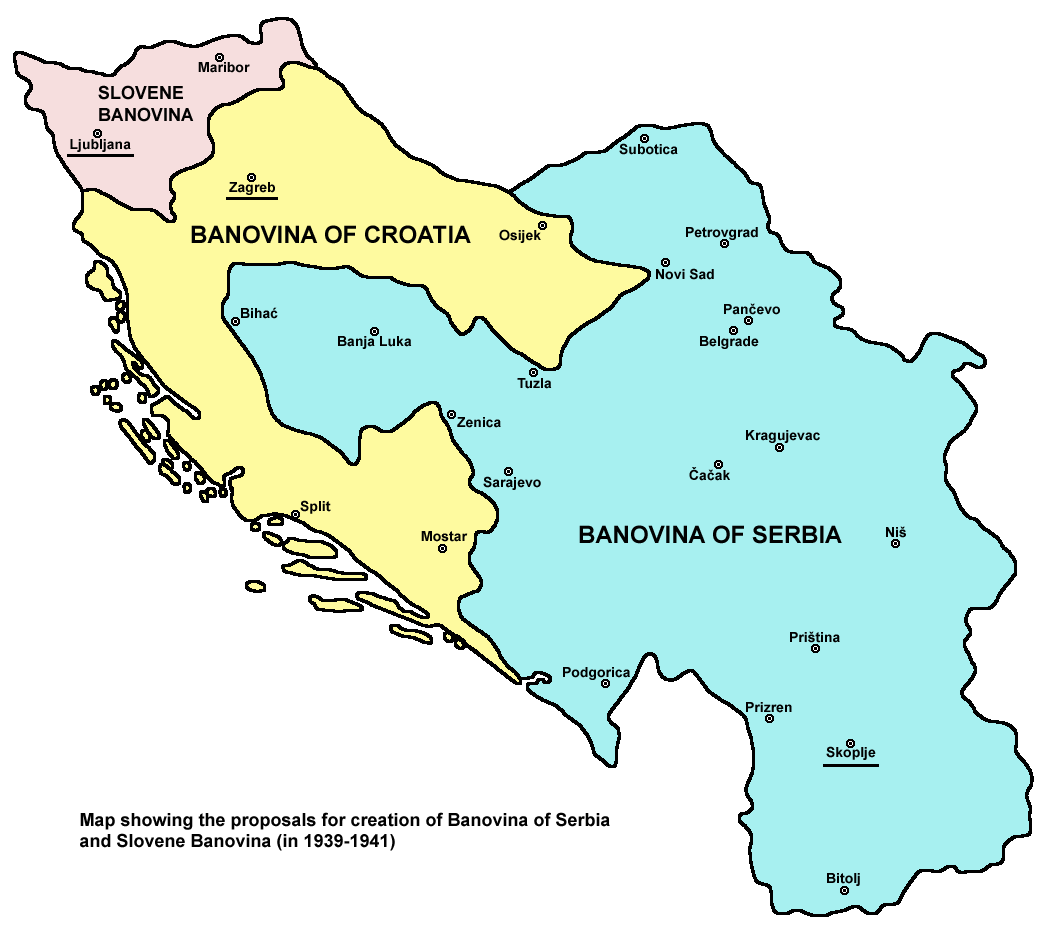
Proposed banovinas of Yugoslavia.

The Banovina of Serbia or Banate of Serbia (Serbo-Croatian: Banovina Srbija / Бановина Србија), officially known as "the Serbian Lands" (Srpske zemlje / Српске земље), was a proposed administrative unit of the Kingdom of Yugoslavia. Its creation was proposed after the establishment of the Banovina of Croatia in 1939. However, due to the Axis occupation and partition of Yugoslavia in 1941 (see World War II in Yugoslavia), the proposal was never implemented.

== Proposal ==
The creation of the Banovina of Croatia in 1939–40 had been negotiated between Prime Minister Dragiša Cvetković and Croatian leader Vladko Maček (of the HSS) in March–August 1939, and settled through an agreement on 26 August. Croatia, therefore, became the only banovina (in English also known as banate) constituted on the principle of ethnicity and/or nationality, named after the Croats (with only a minority of ethnic Croats left outside it), and thus was close in nature to a nation state. The agreement to form the Croatian banovina had little support among Serbian political parties, while the Serbian Orthodox Church and Royal Yugoslav Army openly opposed it. Relations between Croatian and Serbian politicians (and Croats and Serbs) strained. Its creation opened the question of the political status of the Serbs ("the Serbian question") in the Kingdom of Yugoslavia, with some Serb intellectuals (notably the members of the Serbian Cultural Club) and politicians (including some members of the Yugoslav government, such as Dragiša Cvetković) proposed and planned the creation of the Serbian banovina, which would include the territory of the existing banovinas of Vrbas, Drina, Danube, Morava, Zeta and Vardar. The Banovina of Croatia included a notable Serb population, while the Serbian one would have similarly included a considerable non-Serb and non-Slavic population. The plans were affirmed in the February 1940 number of Glas, a Serb-centric periodical, published by Matica srpska. It was stated that, apart from the Banovina of Croatia, only the Serbian banovina and theoretical Banovina of Slovenia had the precedent and right to form and exist, as states of three constitutional ethnic groups which formed Yugoslavia, i.e. State of Slovenes, Croats and Serbs and Kingdom of Serbs, Croats and Slovenes. The process of its organization was supposed to be similar to that of Croatia, i.e. merger of existing banovinas east and south of Croatia into one larger entity.

== Demographics ==
According to 1931 Yugoslav census, the existing banovinas that, according to the proposal, would be included into the Banovina of Serbia had the following population:

- Vrbas Banovina: 1,037,382, of which 600,529 (58%) Orthodox Christians
- Drina Banovina: 1,534,739, of which 992,924 (65%) Orthodox Christians
- Danube Banovina: 2,387,295, of which 1,393,269 (58%) Orthodox Christians
- Morava Banovina: 1,435,584, of which 1,364,490 (95%) Orthodox Christians
- Zeta Banovina: 925,516, of which 516,490 (56%) Orthodox Christians
- Vardar Banovina: 1,574,243, of which 1,046,039 (66%) Orthodox Christians

== See also ==
- Ethnic groups in Yugoslavia
- History of modern Serbia

== Sources ==
- Bazić, Jovan (2003). Srpsko pitanje: političke koncepcije rešavanja srpskog nacionalnog pitanja. Službeni list Srbije i Crne Gore. ISBN 9788635505862.
- Djilas, Aleksa (1991). The Contested Country: Yugoslav Unity and Communist Revolution, 1919-1953. Harvard University Press. pp. 130–132, 144, 149, 217. ISBN 978-0-674-16698-1.
- Djokić, Dejan; Ker-Lindsay, James (2010). New Perspectives on Yugoslavia: Key Issues and Controversies. Routledge. pp. 67–77. ISBN 978-1-136-93132-1.
- Matica srpska (1999). Proceedings in history. Novi Sad: Matica srpska.
- Vucinich, Wayne S.; Tomasevich, Jozo (1969). Contemporary Yugoslavia: Twenty Years of Socialist Experiment. University of California Press. pp. 31–. GGKEY:5JR74ERLNET.
