= Banski dvor (Banja Luka) =

Building in Banja Luka

Banski Dvor
- Бански двор

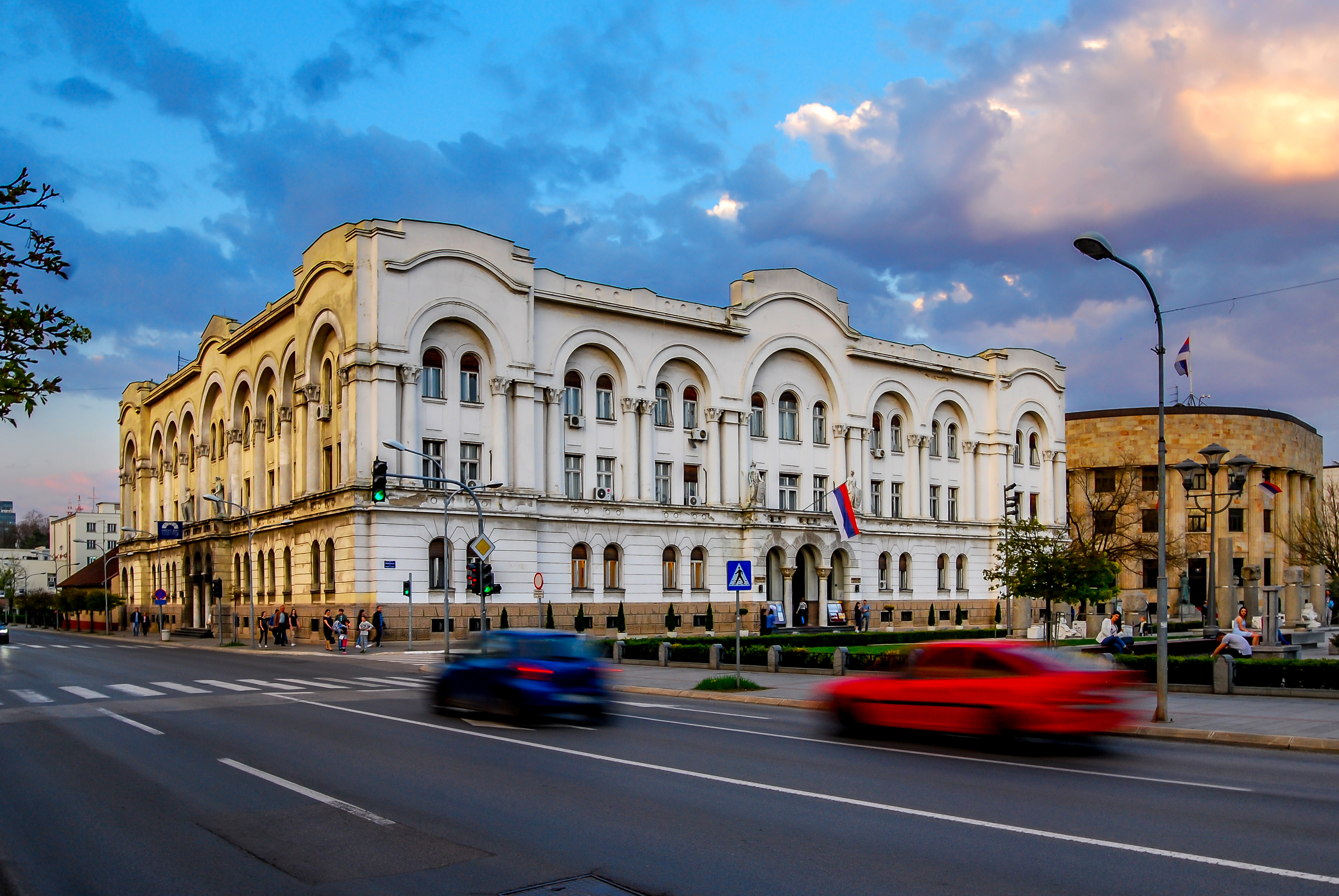

- Location within Bosnia and Herzegovina

General information
- Type: Palace
- Location: Banja Luka, Bosnia and Herzegovina
- Coordinates: 44.7731°N 17.1924°E

Design and construction
- Architects: Jovanka Bončić-Katerinić, Anđelija Pavlović and Jovan Ž. Ranković

Website
- Official site

Banski Dvor (Serbian Cyrillic: Бански двор) is a building and cultural center in Banja Luka. It was built in the period 1931–32 as the seat of Duke ("Ban") of Vrbas Banovina, an administrative region of the Kingdom of Yugoslavia.

== Nowadays ==
In 1998 Banski Dvor officially became a public cultural institution and nowadays is the most important cultural center of the city of Banja Luka and the Serb Republic with of thousand of visitors per year. Every year it holds hundreds of events, notable for their high number and variety: concerts, exhibitions of local and foreign artists, book presentations, roundtables and it cooperates with the realizations of important happenings and festivals of the city. Until the reconstruction of the Palace of Republika Srpska, in 2008, it served as the seat of the President of Republika Srpska of Bosnia.

== Palace ==
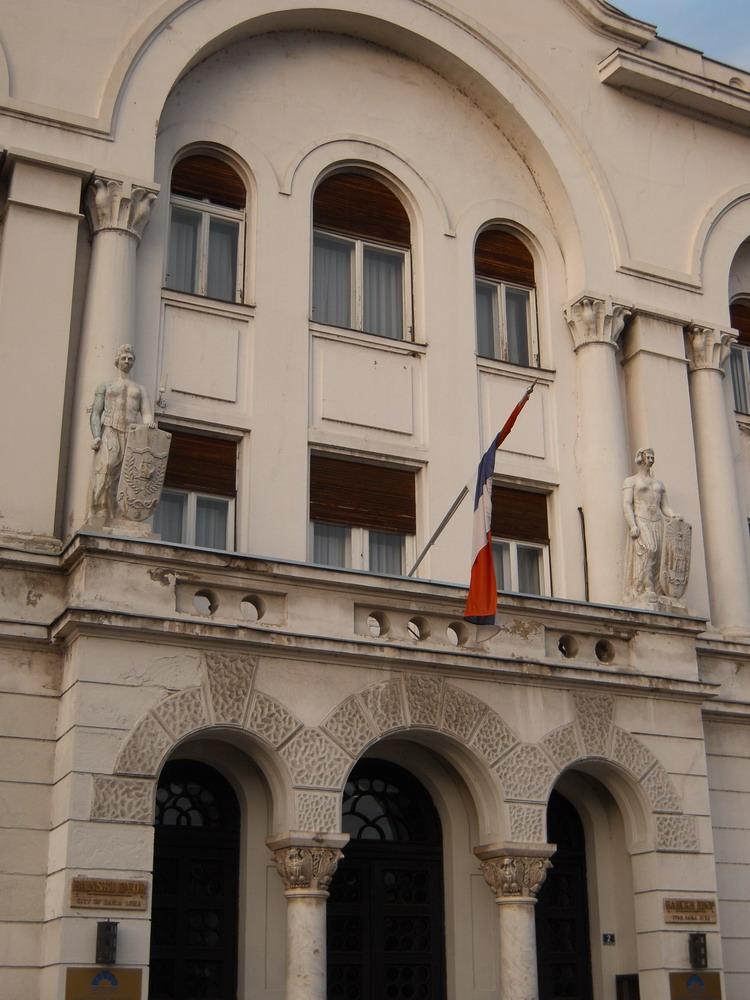

When the Vrbas Banate was formed in 1929, the first Ban was Svetislav Tisa Milosavljević and he felt the need to build a representative seat. In early 1931, the competition was announced in Belgrade and Sarajevo's National newspapers, for the conceptual sketch of Ban’s Court (Banski Dvor) and Ban's Palace (Banski Palat), and the first award was received by the architects from Belgrade Jovanka Bončić-Katerinić, Anđelija Pavlovic and John G. Rankovic. The major work was awarded to the construction company Kosta Šijački from Belgrade, under the direction of the young architect Branko Jovanović, while the artistic design of the facade and the interiors was led by the sculptor and academician Đorđe Jovanović. The works on Banski Dvor began in March 1931, while the official opening of the building was on 8 November 1932. Bans court had rooms for meetings, conference rooms, a hall, flat ban with the apartment for important visitors, the room heating, kitchen, toilets, dressing rooms and other spaces.

== Architecture ==
In the lower zones of the building is dominated by a Renaissance influence and academic classicism and medieval architecture elements are present in higher zones. Important place belongs to the folk elements of the Balkan Peninsula.

After the war in Bosnia and Herzegovina from 1992 to 1995, in accordance with the provisions of Annex General Framework Agreement for Peace in Bosnia and Herzegovina, and the provisions of the Implementation of the Decisions of the Commission to Preserve National Monuments in Bosnia and Herzegovina, Banski Dvor enjoys the status of a national monument, one of the most important for Bosnia and Herzegovina. In addition to the exceptional architectural value, this monument of architectural heritage partially preserved authentic inner spaces, decoration and furniture. Originally preserved interiors are inseparable cultural, historical and aesthetic whole with overall architectural values of the building. As a unique monument of representative interior design from the beginning of the fourth decade of the 20th century, the work of well-known and in its time highly regarded creators - decorators - because of its authentic values, aesthetic and stylistic homogeneity, which is the reflection of this period in the history of art and valuable documentation of it, because of its relatively high degree of preservation in relation to the original state, as well as because of the threat expressed in actual and possible changes arising from the use, it is necessary to do detailed scientific research of the interiors and its authentic furniture, and present it to the wider professional audience and to the public, and in that way ensure the preservation of these excellent examples of applied art of its time.

== History ==
The palace was used as residence for the Ban of Vrbas Banovina until 1941. During World War II the interior was destroyed, and most of expensive furniture, paintings and other objects irretrievably lost. After the war, the house was used as a military and political center. Since 1955, the decision passed by the then city authorities, the building was given to the management of the House of Culture. The establishment of the Serb Republic 9 January 1992, Ban's Palace became the seat of the president. And in 1998 officially became a public cultural institution called the Cultural Centre Banski Dvor.

=== World War II damage and subsequent uses ===
The biggest damage to the building and its interiors occurred during the Second World War, when the German command troop was located in it. During this period, the Big ceremonial hall was used as a warehouse for grain, and for a while even as a stable. During the war interiors were ruined, and a large amount of precious furniture and equipment robbed--chandeliers, carpets, art, furniture, kitchenware. After the liberation of Banja Luka, the building was used as headquarters for the 37th Division of NOV, it was partially equipped for the purposes of an army club. After 1945 further adaptations were made gradually and the building kept changing its users: the Communist Party District Committee, Municipal Committee of the Communist Party, District and Municipal Committee of Communist Youth, the Popular Front, the Anti-Fascist Council of Women, District Union Council, the Workers' cultural and artistic society "Pelagic".

During 1952-1953, the County workers' council has allocated 4,500,000 dinars and organized labor action in collectives, to bring back to use Grand hall and other damaged spaces.

=== Restoration project ===
The restoration project from 1953 was signed by the architect Stojan Borovnica, engineer from Banja Luka present at the auction for masonry and covering works at the Palace in 1931. During this renovation, in 1953, the idea emerged that the building should be given the name and the function Radnički Dom (Workers' Hall). The new function started to take shape since 1954, when the building started to hold concerts, ballet courses, sections for music, poetry and theatrical content etc. During that time idea about forming Cultural centre started to emerge, in the meantime, the building housed City library, Reading room, City Museum, Workers' University, the editors office "of Banja Luka newspaper", with Radio Club radio station, music school. Some of these institutions have remained in the building until the 1969 earthquake.

=== Earthquake and last changes ===
In the earthquake the building was very badly damaged, so the interior suffered changes. Restoration was carried out in 1972 according to the original project documentation. The exterior appearance of the building is a complete reconstruction of the original appearance that almost in nothing deviate from the authentic, but the internal spaces significantly altered compared to the original design, in the layout of the rooms as well as in the appearance of the details. Parter, Grand Hall and the Blue salon, halls and stairways suffered the least changes in purpose, schedule, size and decoration, while the biggest changes were made in the premises of the second floor, which is logical when one takes into account that the building was adjusted to the new function - a set of different administrative activities in the field of culture, Arts and Science.

== Gallery ==
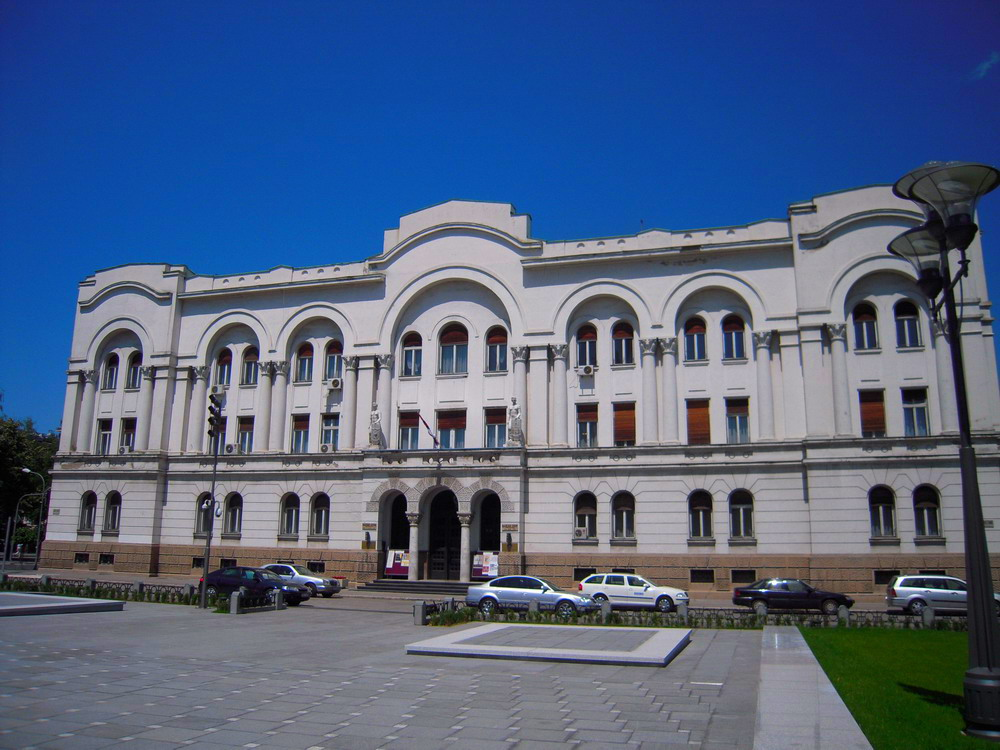

== See also ==
- Banovina Palace
