= Jovanka Bončić-Katerinić =

Serbian and Yugoslav architect

- Born: 5 July 1887; Niš, Serbia
- Died: 27 December 1966 (aged 79); Belgrade, Serbia, Yugoslavia
- Occupation: Architect
- Known for: Banski Dvor in Banja Luka, Faculty of Veterinary Medicine in Belgrade
- Spouse: Andrej Katerinić

Jovanka Bončić-Katerinić (Serbian Cyrillic: Јованка Бончић-Катеринић; 5 July 1887 – 27 December 1966) was a Serbian and then Yugoslav architect who worked in the interwar period. Born in Serbia, Bončić-Katerinić was the first woman to obtain an engineering degree in Imperial Germany.

== Education and early life ==
Bončić was born in Niš, Serbia, in 1887. Her father was Mihailo, a lawyer and judge. Her mother, Katarina Petrović, was originally from Belgrade. Bončić first attended elementary school in Požarevac and then in Vranje. In 1905, she graduated from a Belgrade high school and went on to study architecture at the University of Belgrade. While there, she undertook an internship for the Serbian State Railways. In her last year of studies, she was granted a scholarship from the Ministry of Construction allowing her to attend Darmstadt University in Germany where she obtained two degrees. In 1913, she graduated with a bachelor's degree in architecture and also one in engineering.

In 1914, Bončić married Ukrainian engineer Andrej Katerinić, whom she met at Darmstadt University. They lived in several cities, including Petrograd, Riga, Moscow, Kozelovo, Kiev, Padolsky and the outskirts of Odessa. To escape the Russian Revolution, they fled to Belgrade in 1922. He worked as an engineer for the municipal government. Bončić and her husband had three sons, Mihailo, Petar and Vitaly.

== Career ==
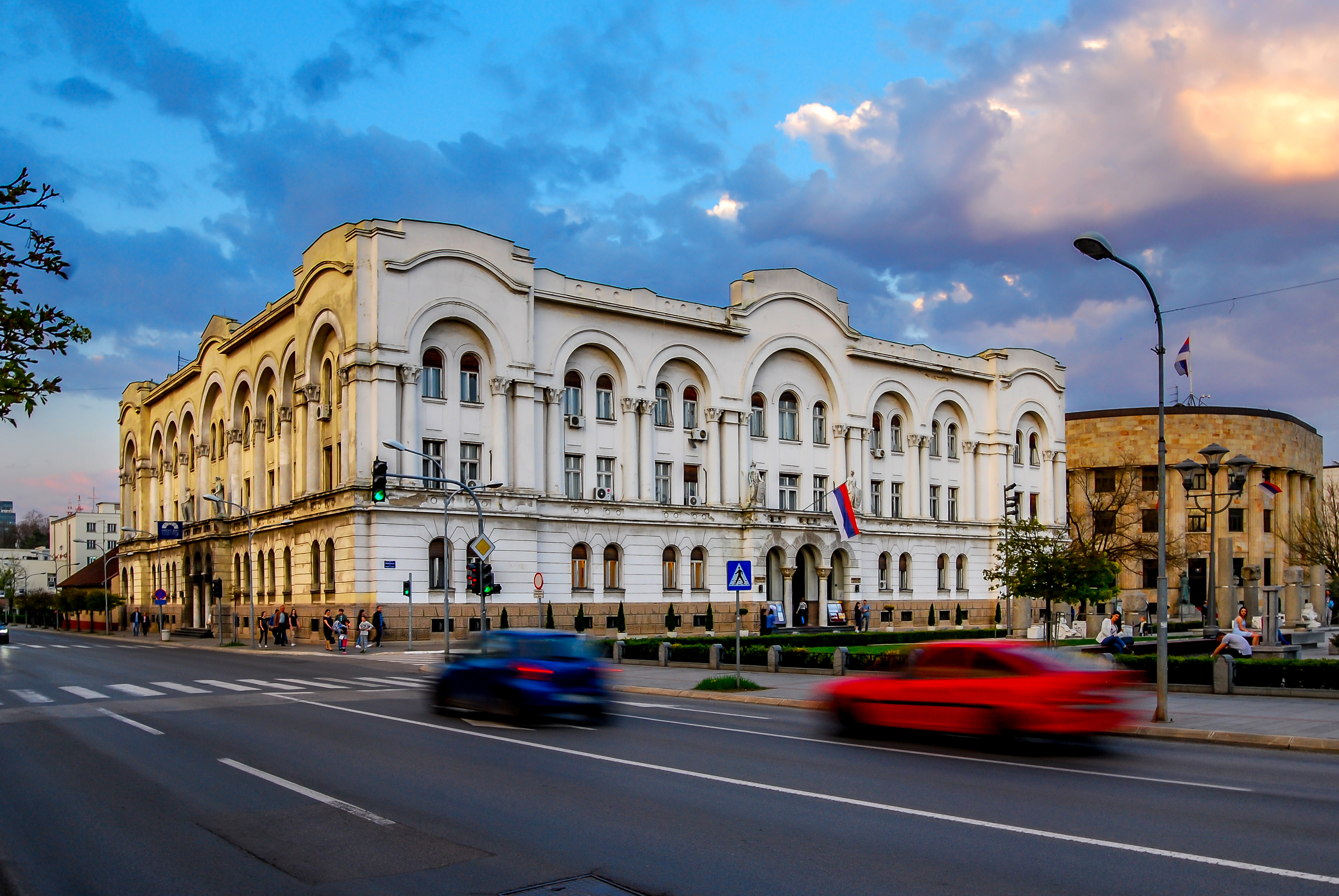
Banski Dvor Cultural Center, Banja Luka

Bončić was hired by the Yugoslav Ministry of Construction starting in the 1920s. Until the outbreak of the Second World War, she constructed mostly public buildings in modern-day Serbia and in Bosnia-Herzegovina. In 1931, she helped construct the Banski Dvor cultural center in Banja Luka. Banski Dvor is today a national monument of Bosnia and Herzegovina.

She was the architect of several structures in Belgrade. In 1935, she built the "Queen Mary Women Teachers Training School" and co-designed the Faculty of Law building with architect Petar Bajalović. She also worked on the reconstruction of the "Ankera" home located on Balkanska street. She is known for having designed Belgrade's Faculty of Veterinary Medicine in 1939. The structure is free standing and has an unadorned facade.

Bončić also built part of the spa baths in Banja Koviljača. She designed a hospital in Despotovac and a high school in Smederevo. She built several elementary schools throughout Serbia. During the Second World War, she did minor contracts in Petrovac for the Ministry of Construction and retired in 1945.

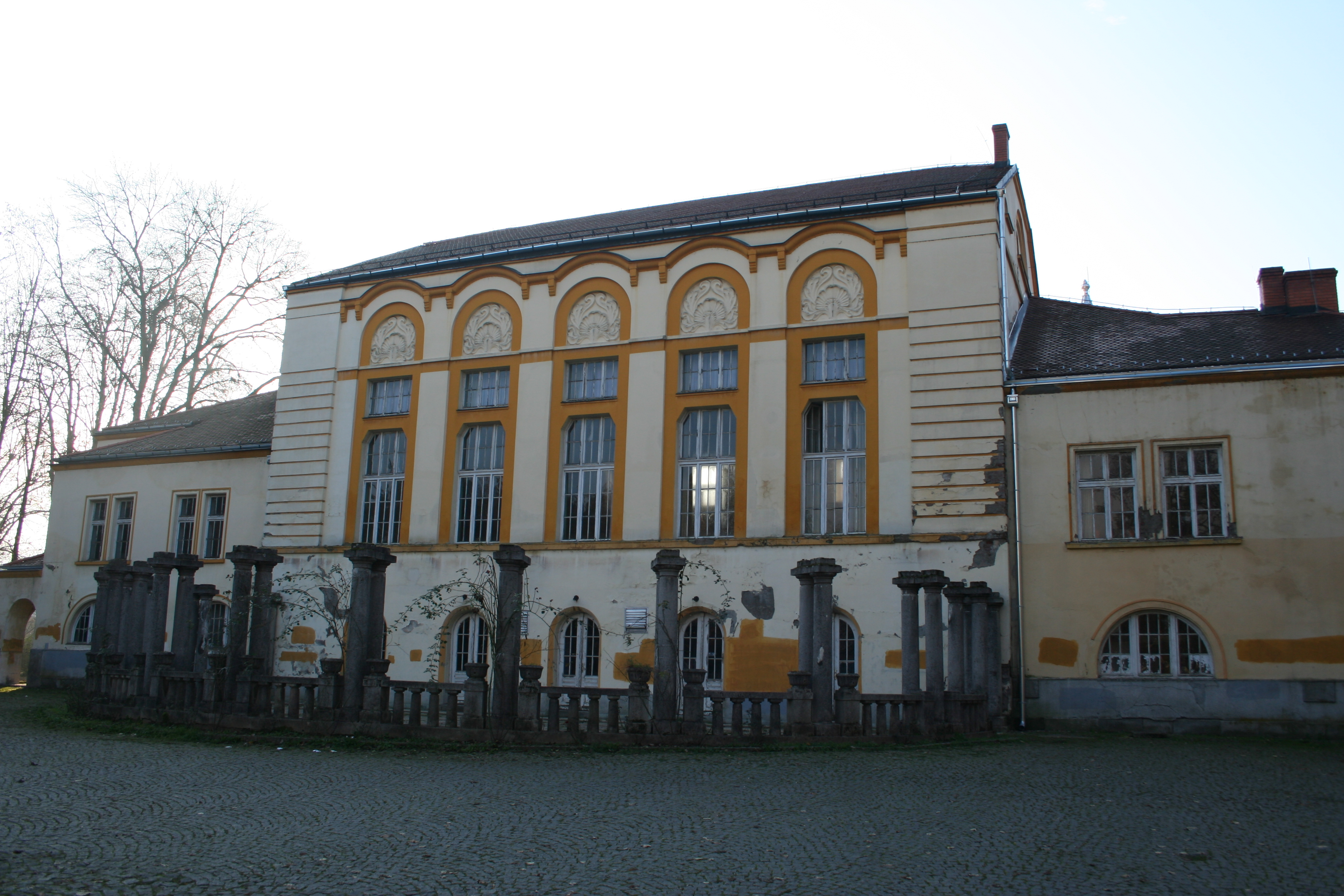
Koviljača Spa

== Awards and distinctions ==
In 1928, Bončić was decorated with the Order of St. Sava from the Yugoslav government. Ten years later she received the Order of the Yugoslav Crown. In 2018, her original blueprints were exhibited at the Faculty of Veterinary Medicine during the annual Museum Night event.

A geology prize in her name is awarded at Darmstadt University, where she became the first woman to receive an engineering degree in Germany in 1913. The Berlin newspaper "Illustrierte Zeitung" even covered the story of Bončić's graduation with a photo of her surrounded by an all male class. The Darmstadt University campus also boasts a street in her name.

== See also ==
- Jelisaveta Načić
