= Banovina =

Banovina may refer to:

- Banovinas of the Kingdom of Yugoslavia, administrative divisions from 1929 to 1941
- Banovina (region) in central Croatia, also known as Banija
- Radio Banovina, a radio station in Glina, Croatia
- Banovina (Novi Sad), a government building in Novi Sad, Serbia
- Banovina (Split), a government building in Split, Croatia

== See also ==
- Banate (disambiguation)
- Banat (disambiguation)
- Banski dvor (disambiguation)
