= Serbian question =

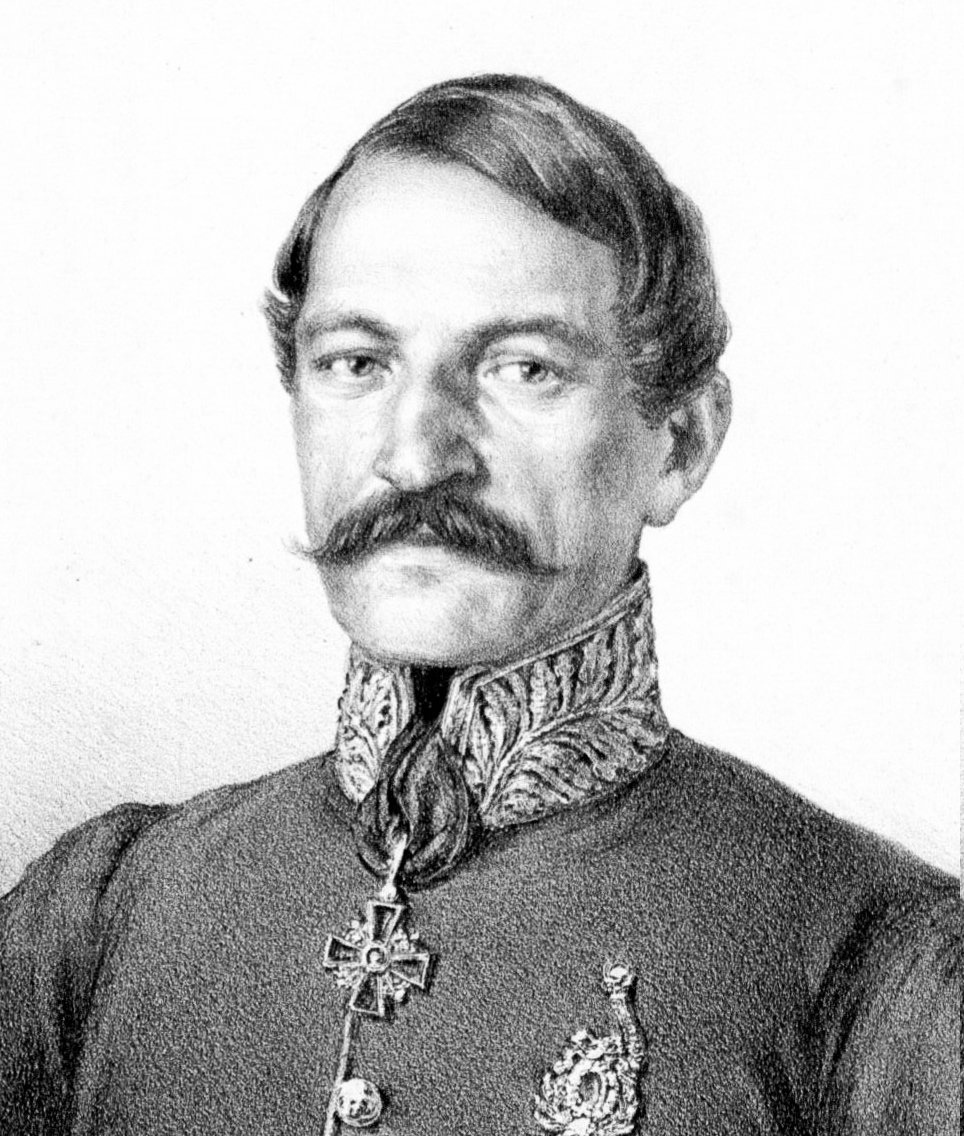
Ilija Garašanin

Serbian question (Serbian: Српско питање / Srpsko pitanje) refers to several periods in Serbian history and diplomatic history.

- Establishment of a Serb nation-state, leading up to the Serbian Revolution.
- Official recognition of Revolutionary Serbia as the Principality of Serbia and international recognition (1815–1878).
- Serb uprising of 1848–1849 in the Austrian Empire.
- Great Eastern Crisis (1875–78).
- Pan-Slavism and Yugoslavism versus Pan-Serbism, in the Kingdom of Serbia and Serb community in Austria-Hungary.
- Serb unification in the Balkan Wars and World War I, and Austrian thwarting of Serbian expansion and influence.
- Creation of the Serbian Banovina in the Kingdom of Yugoslavia in 1940.
- Status of Serbia (and Serbs) within SFR Yugoslavia.
- Serb unification in the Yugoslav Wars.

== See also ==
- Creation of Yugoslavia
- Serbian historiography

== Sources ==
- Bazić, Jovan (2003). Srpsko pitanje: političke koncepcije rešavanja srpskog nacionalnog pitanja. Službeni list Srbije i Crne Gore. ISBN 9788635505862.
- Blitz, Brad K. (2008). "Democratic development, judicial reform and the Serbian question in Croatia". Human Rights Review. 9 (1): 123–135. doi:10.1007/s12142-007-0036-0. S2CID 145727189.
- Ćosić, Dobrica (2009). Srpsko pitanje u XX veku: lična istorija jednog doba. Службени гласник. ISBN 978-86-519-0371-0.
- Djokić, Dejan (January 2003). Yugoslavism: Histories of a Failed Idea, 1918-1992. C. Hurst & Co. Publishers. pp. 42–. ISBN 978-1-85065-663-0.
- Dragović-Soso, Jasna (2004). "Rethinking Yugoslavia: Serbian Intellectuals and the 'National Question' in Historical Perspective" (PDF). Contemporary European History. 13 (2): 170–184. doi:10.1017/s0960777304001638. S2CID 11952048.
- Gligorijević, Branislav (1992). Kominterna jugoslovensko i srpsko pitanje. Institut za savremenu istoriju. ISBN 9788674030387.
- Hadži-Jovanović, Duška (1995). "The Serbian Question in The Balkans".
- Ilić, Jovan (1995). The Serbian question in the Balkans. Faculty of Geography, University of Belgrade. ISBN 9788682657019.
- Ilić, Jovan (1995). The Balkan geopolitical knot and the Serbian question.
- Jovanović, Vladimir (1863). The Serbian Nation and the Eastern Question. Bell and Daldy. pp. 16–.
- Jović, Dejan (2009). Yugoslavia: A State that Withered Away. Purdue University Press. ISBN 978-1-55753-495-8.
- Komatina, Milija (1999). Crna Gora i srpsko pitanje. Zavet. ISBN 9788670340329.
- Lampe, John R. (2011). "Yugoslavia Vanishes: The British Turn to the Serbian Question". Contemporary European History. 20 (1): 81–95. doi:10.1017/s0960777310000391.
- Markus, Tomislav (2011). "The Serbian question in Croatian politics, 1848-1918". Review of Croatian History. 6 (1): 165–188.
- Meriage, Lawrence P. (1978). "The First Serbian Uprising (1804-1813) and the Nineteenth-Century Origins of the Eastern Question". Slavic Review. 37 (3): 421–439. doi:10.2307/2497684. JSTOR 2497684.
- Milosavljević, Petar (2007). Srpsko pitanje i srbistika. Logos. ISBN 9788684647308.
- Novaković, Stojan (1910). Najnovija Balkanska kriza i Srpsko pitanje: beleške, razmišljanja, razgovori i politički članci iz 1908-1909. Štamparija "Štampe" St. M. Ivkovića i Komp.
- Ocić, Đorđe (1989). I Srbi su Crnogorci: Kosovo i srpsko pitanje. Nar. knj.
- Petranović, Branko (2002). The Yugoslav Experience of Serbian National Integration. East European Monographs. ISBN 978-0-88033-484-6.
- Popović, Vasilj (1940). Европа и српско питање у периоду ослобођења (1804-1918). Geca Kon.
- Samardžić, Momir (2016). "Аустро-српски односи и питање границе на Дрини 1878–1879" (PDF). Историјски часопис. 65. Belgrade: Istorijski institut: 229–248.
- Subotić, Momčilo Lj. (2008). Srpsko pitanje danas. In-t za političke studije. ISBN 9788674191736.
- Terzić, Slavenko; Ralić, Prvoslav (1993). "The Right to Self-Determination and the Serbian Question". Belgrade: Ministry of Information.
- Trbovich, Ana S. (2008). A Legal Geography of Yugoslavia's Disintegration. Oxford University Press, USA. pp. 68–. ISBN 978-0-19-533343-5.
