= Svetislav Milosavljević =

Serbian military architect and public officer

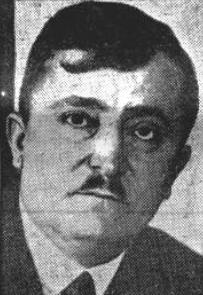

Personal details
- Born: September 7, 1882 Niš
- Died: July 28, 1960 Belgrade

Svetislav "Tisa" Milosavljević (Serbian Cyrillic: Светислав Тиса Милосављевић; 9 July 1882 – 28 July 1960) was a Serbian military architect and public officer. He was the first ban of the Vrbas Banovina, and during his term between 1929 and 1934 he significantly improved its capital city of Banja Luka, which celebrates him today as one of distinguished citizens. Afterwards, he was the Minister of Transport of the Kingdom of Yugoslavia.

== Biography ==
Svetislav was the eldest son of a wealthy Niš businessman, Toma Milosavljević. He planned to become an engineer, but his father's financial collapse forced him into the military profession. He became an authority on military traffic while advancing at the end of 1925 to the rank of Brigadier General.

Milosavljević on the coat of arms of Banja Luka

He arrived at Banja Luka on 8 November 1929. In a short time with a substantial state financial aid he helped develop the Vrbas Banovina, and in particular Banja Luka. His greatest accomplishments include the Banska palata (now the city administration), Banski Dvor, the Banja Luka Theatre (founded in 1930 and today's building built 1934), Public Health Institute, the facilities and the Teacher's School of Agriculture, the east wing of the then Grammar School, and seven residential buildings for public officers (present-day Alley Saint Sava and at the Post Office). He helped establish the Banate Museum, Association for Tourism and Craft and the Chamber of Commerce.

Although not a direct investor, builder or founder, Milosavljević was credited for the emergence of the Banja Luka town park with a monument to Petar Kočić, upgrading the hotel Bosna, paving and street lighting, and for the construction of Sokolski Dom, City Municipality and the Hotel Palace.

He left Banja Luka and the ban appointment on 22 April 1934 to become a Minister of Transport of the Kingdom of Yugoslavia. He would return to Banja Luka only once more, on 18 May 1939, when he accepted the invitation of the Banja Luka Orthodox parish and came to the cathedral shrine. He was greeted by a crowd of 20,000.
