= Banat, India =

Banat Balwant
- city
- Nickname: Banet City
- Location in Uttar Pradesh, India Banat (India)
- Coordinates: 29.47°N 77.35°E
- Country: India
- State: Uttar Pradesh
- District: Shamli district
- Established: 2014
- Founder: Timmy

Government
  - Type: Indian
- Elevation: 254 m (833 ft)

Population (2011)
  - Total: 7,458

Languages
  - Official: Khariboli, Haryanvi, Hindi, Urdu, English
- Time zone: UTC+5:30 (IST)
- Vehicle registration: UP
- Website: up.gov.in

Banat is a town in Shamli district in the state of Uttar Pradesh, India. Banat is situated near Shamli City.

== Geography ==
Banat is located at 29.61°N 77.15°E. It has an average elevation of 254 metres (797 feet).

== Demographics ==
As of the 2011 Census of India, Banat had a population of 7458. Males constitute 53% of the population and females 47%. Banat has an average literacy rate of 87%, higher than the national average of 74%; with 88% of the males and 85% of females literate. 11% of the population is under 6 years of age.
