= Banatić =

Banatić Банатић
- Urban neighborhood
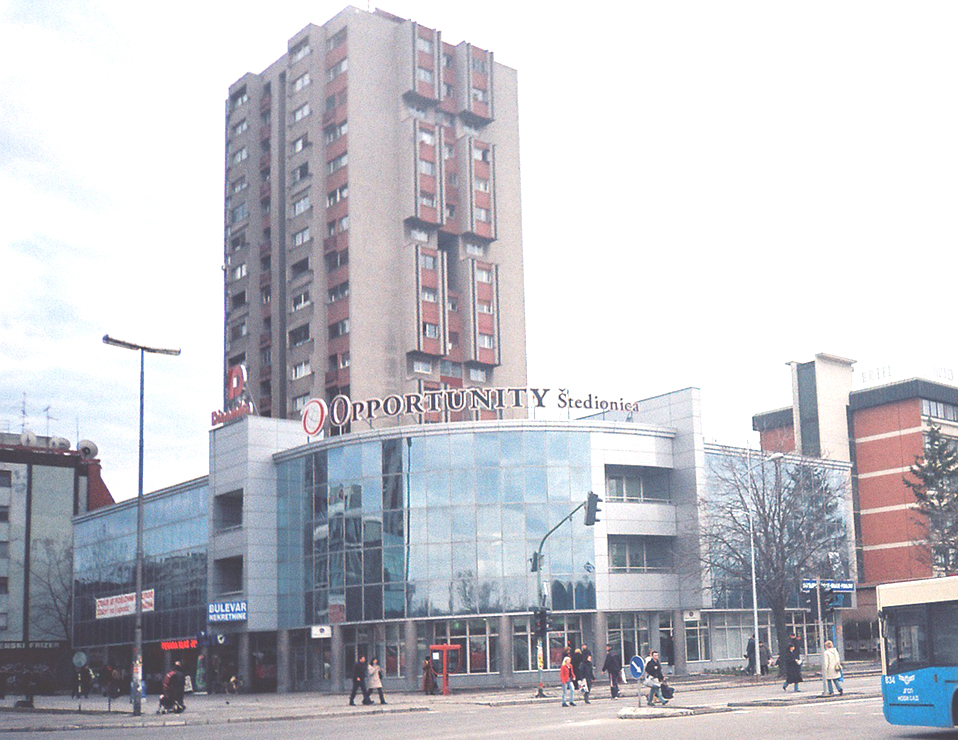
- Banatić, Jaša Tomić Boulevard
- Interactive map of Banatić
- Country: Serbia
- Province: Vojvodina
- District: South Bačka
- Municipality: Novi Sad
- Time zone: UTC+1 (CET)
  - Summer (DST): UTC+2 (CEST)
- Area code: +381(0)21
- Car plates: NS

Banatić (Serbian: Банатић) is an urban neighborhood of the city of Novi Sad, Serbia. Its name means "a little Banat".

== Borders ==
The southern border of Banatić is Bulevar kralja Petra I (King Petar I Boulevard), the eastern border is Bulevar oslobođenja (Liberation Boulevard), the north-eastern borders are Bulevar Jaše Tomića (Jaša Tomić Boulevard) and Kisačka ulica (Kisač street), the northern border is railway Belgrade-Subotica, the north-western border is ulica Kornelija Stankovića (Kornelije Stanković Street), and the western border is Rumenačka ulica (Rumenka Street).

== Neighbouring city quarters ==
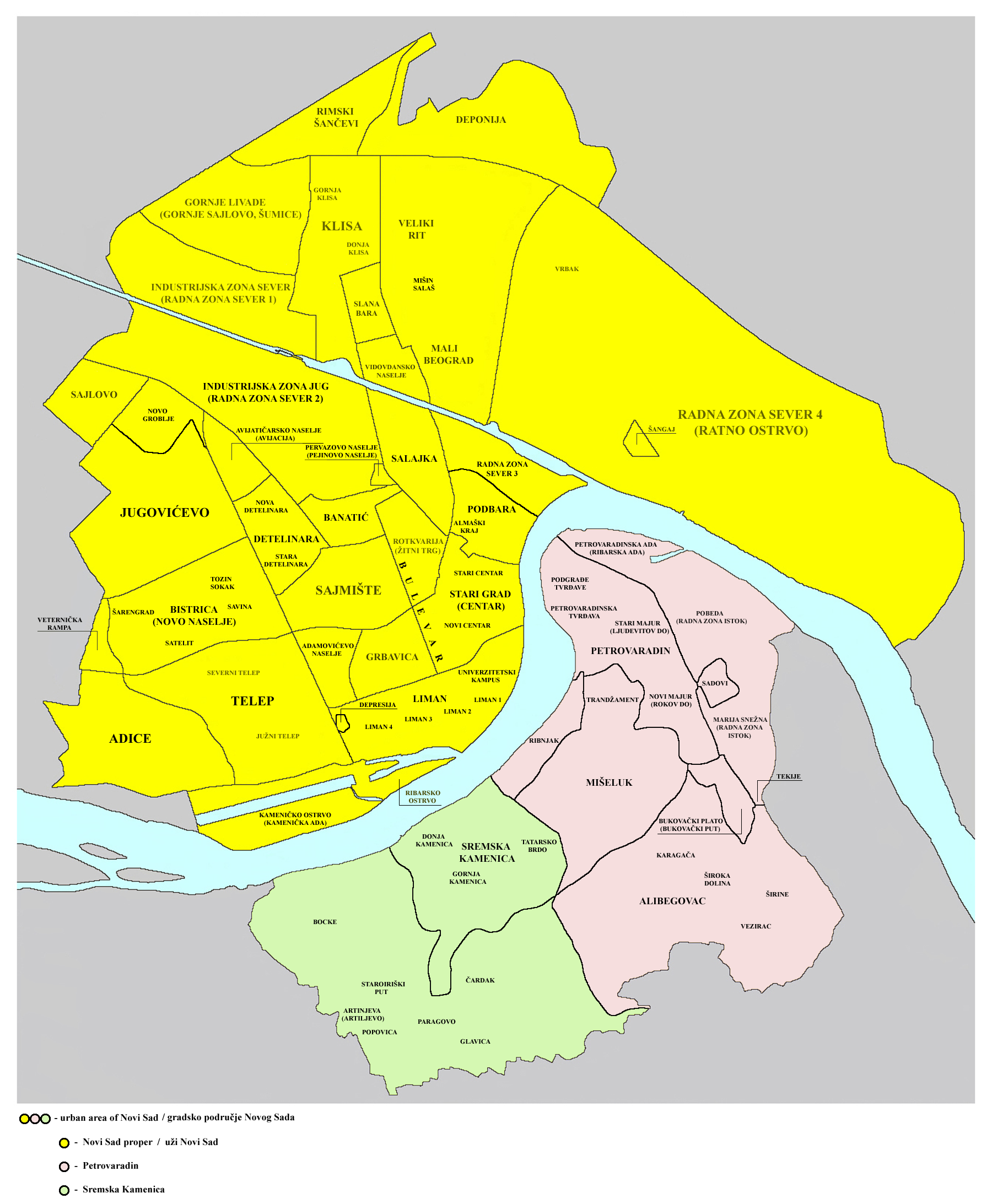
Map of the urban area of Novi Sad with city quarters, showing the location of Banatić

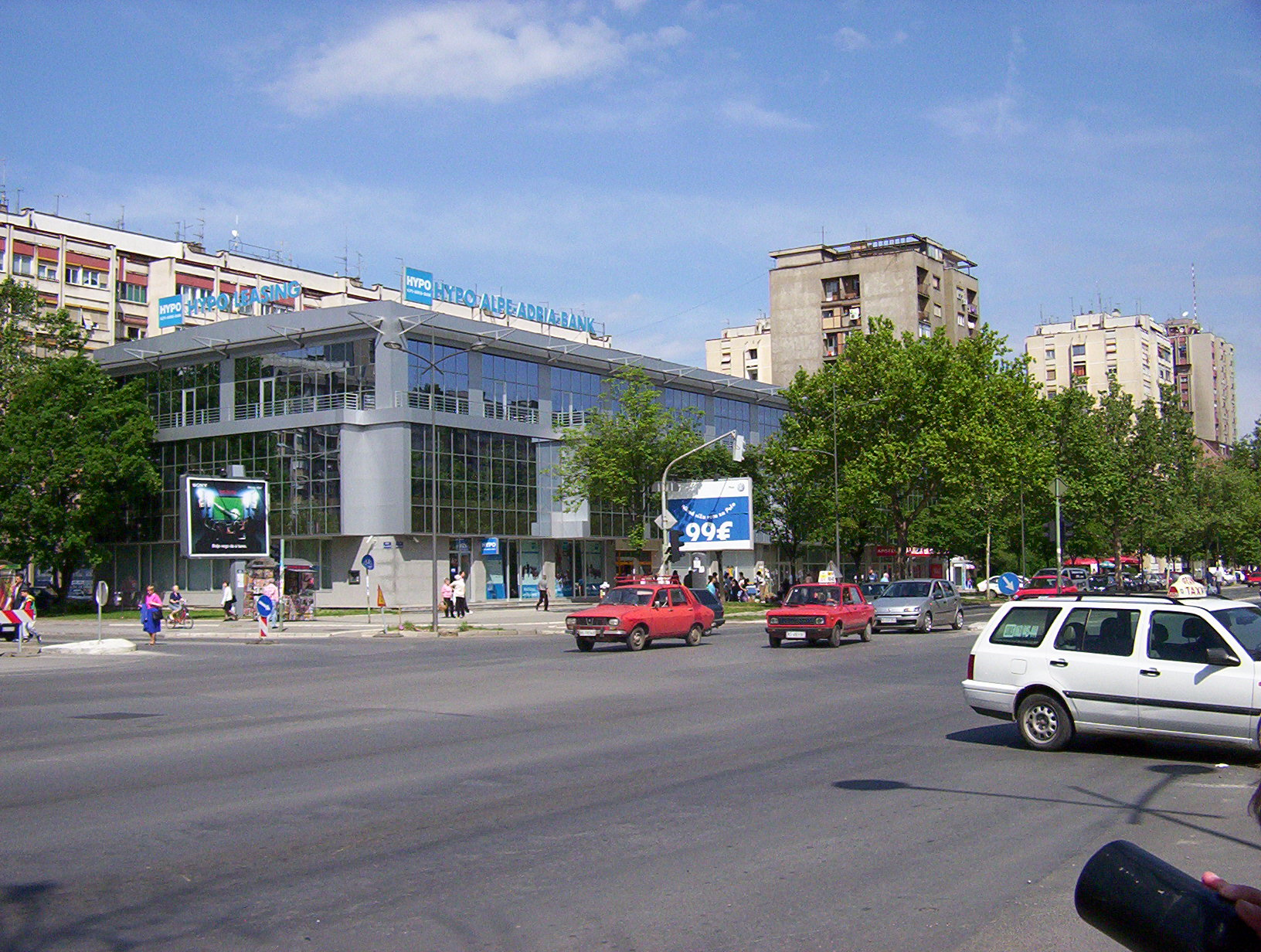
Banatić, Liberation Boulevard

The neighbouring city quarters are: Detelinara in the west, Sajmište in the south, Rotkvarija and Salajka in the east, and Pervazovo Naselje and Industrijska Zona Jug in the north.

== Features ==
The city main train and bus stations are located in Banatić.

== Gallery ==
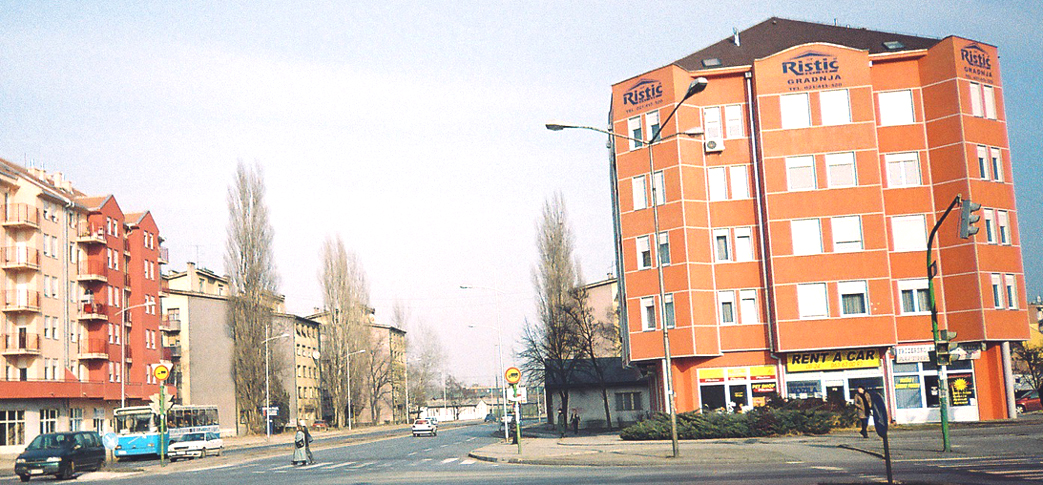
Banatić, Jaša Tomić Boulevard

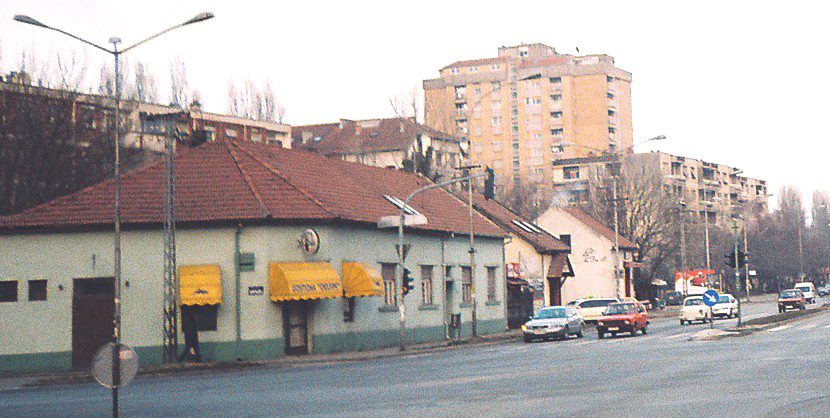
Banatić, King Petar I Boulevard

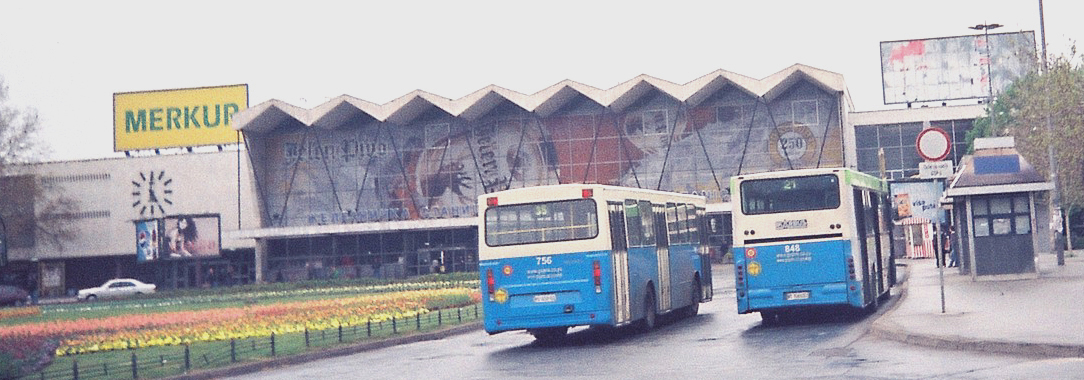
Banatić, Train station

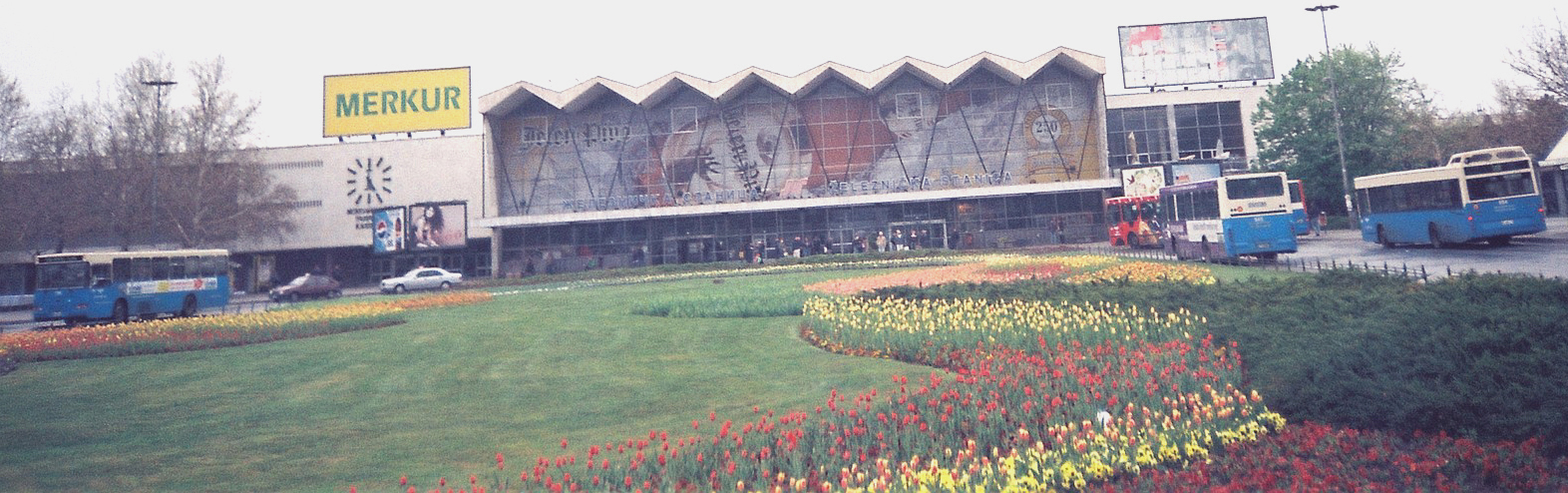
Banatić, Train station

== See also ==
- Neighborhoods of Novi Sad
