= Demographic history of Serbian Banat =

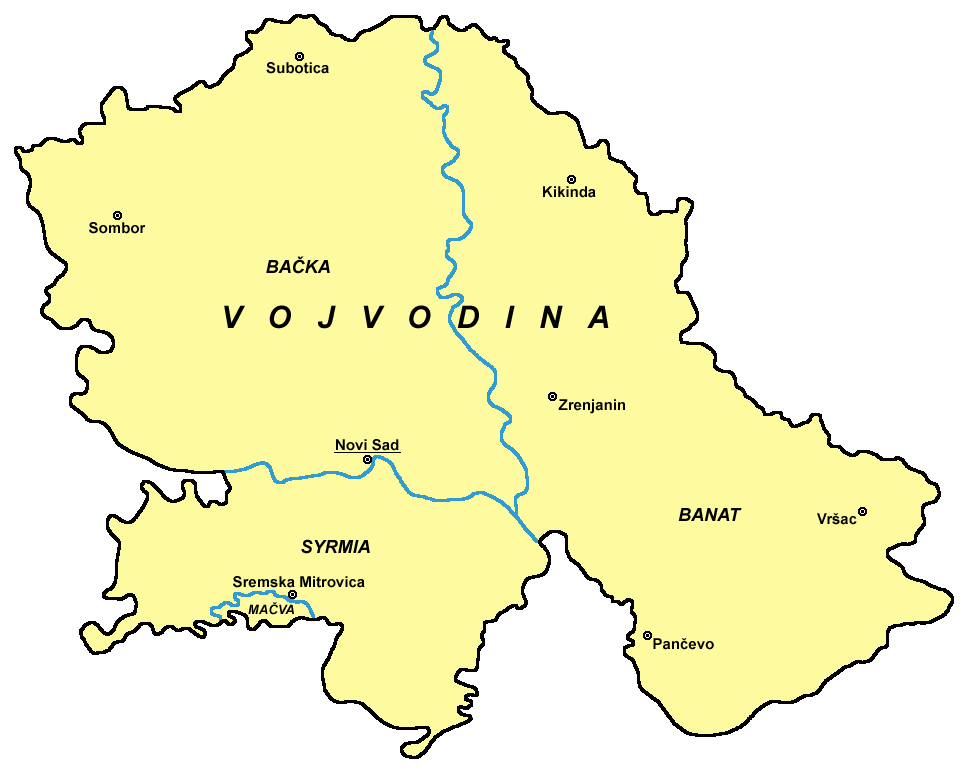
Serbian Banat within province of Vojvodina

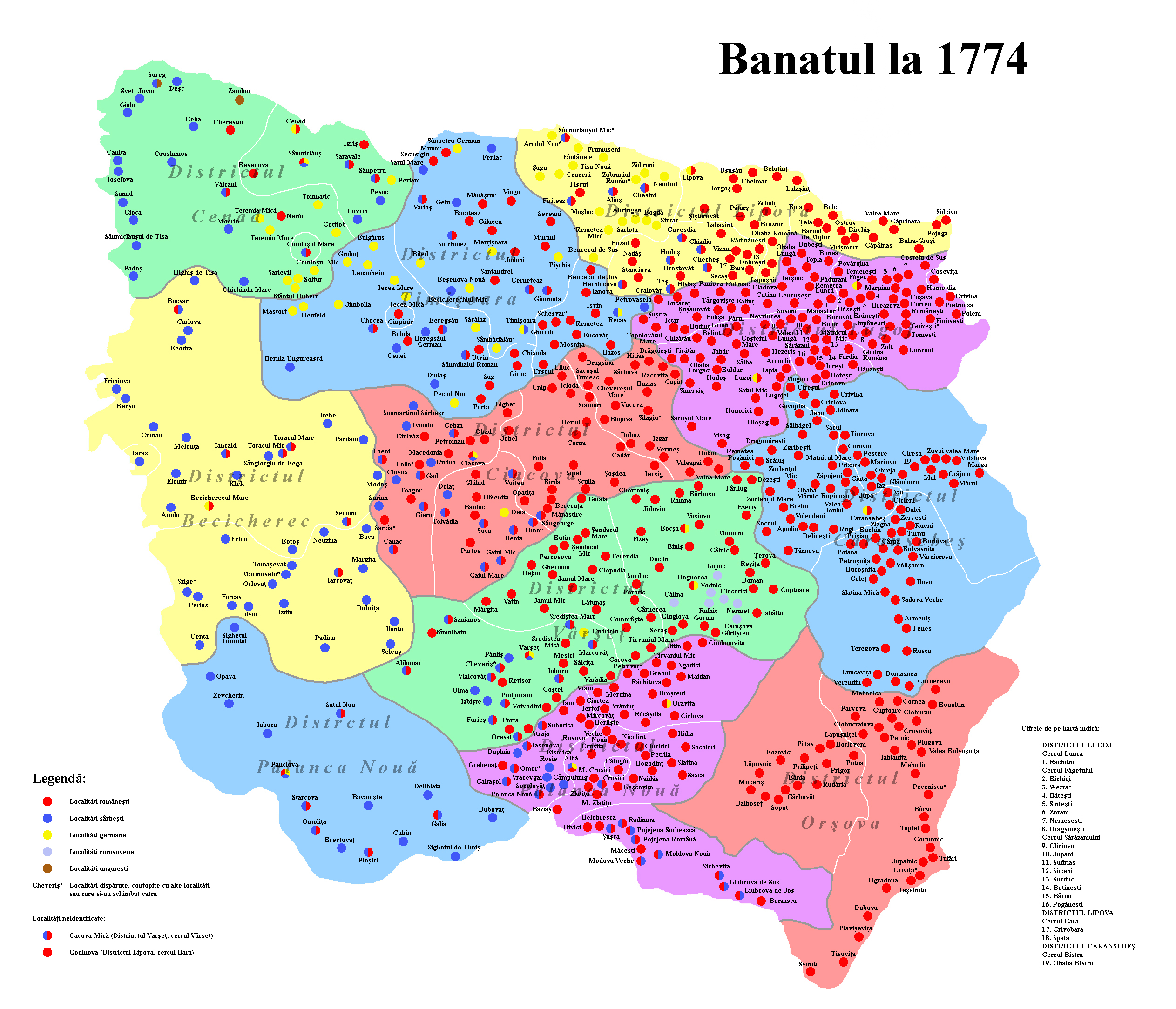
Serb settlements in Banat in 1774

This article is about demographic history of Serbian Banat.

== 1910 ==
According to the 1910 census, the territory of present-day Serbian Banat had a population of 566,400 inhabitants, composed of:

- Serbs = 229,568 (40.5%)
- Germans = 125,374 (22.1%)
- Hungarians = 108,662 (19.2%)
- Romanians = 73,303 (12.9%)
- Slovaks = 16,223 (2.8%)
- Croats = 3,685 (0.6%)

== 1921 ==
According to the 1921 census, the territory of Serbian Banat had a population of 561,958 inhabitants, composed of:

- Serbs and Croats = 240,213 (42.7%)
- Germans = 126,530 (22.5%)
- Hungarians = 98,471 (17.5%)
- Romanians = 67,897 (12.1%)

Of the 169 communes, 61 were predominantly Serbo-Croat-speaking, 29 German, 27 Hungarian, 24 Romanian, 3 Slovak-Czech, and 25 mixed.

== 1931 ==
According to the 1931 census, the territory of Serbian Banat had a population of 585,579 inhabitants, composed of:

- Serbs = 261,123 (44.6%)
- Germans = 120,541 (20.6%)
- Hungarians = 95,867 (16.3%)
- Romanians = 62,365 (10.6%)
- Slovaks = 17,900 (3%)
- Croats = 12,546 (2.1%)

== 1948 ==
According to 1948 census, the territory of Serbian Banat had a population of 601,626 inhabitants, composed of:

- Serbs = 358,067 (59.6%)
- Hungarians = 110,446 (18.3%)
- Romanians = 55,678 (9.2%)
- Slovaks = 20,685 (3.4%)
- Germans = 17,522 (2.9%)
- Croats = 8,727 (1.4%)

== 1953 ==
According to the 1953 census, the territory of Serbian Banat had a population of 617,163 inhabitants, composed of:

- Serbs = 374,258 (60.6%)
- Hungarians = 112,683 (18.2%)
- Romanians = 55,094 (8.9%)
- Slovaks = 21,229 (3.4%)
- Croats = 10,700 (1.7%)

== 1961 ==
According to 1961 census, the territory of Serbian Banat had a population of 655,868 inhabitants, composed of:

- Serbs = 423,837 (64.6%)
- Hungarians = 111,944 (17%)
- Romanians = 54,447 (8.3%)
- Slovaks = 22,306 (3.4%)
- Croats = 8,381 (1.3%)

== 1971 ==
According to the 1971 census, the territory of Serbian Banat had a population of 666,559 inhabitants, composed of:

- Serbs = 434,810 (65.2%)
- Hungarians = 103,090 (15.4%)
- Romanians = 49,455 (7.4%)
- Slovaks = 22,173 (3.3%)
- Macedonians = 12,683 (1.9%)
- Yugoslavs = 10,795 (1.6%)
- Croats = 7,896 (1.2%)

== 1981 ==
According to 1981 census, the territory of Serbian Banat had a population of 672,884 inhabitants, composed of:

- Serbs = 424,765 (65.6%)
- Hungarians = 90,445 (14%)
- Romanians = 43,474 (6.7%)
- Yugoslavs = 42,584 (6.6%)
- Slovaks = 21,392 (3.3%)

== 1991 ==
According to the 1991 census, the territory of Serbian Banat had a population of 648,390 inhabitants, composed of:

- Serbs = 423,475 (65.3%)
- Hungarians = 76,153 (11.7%)
- Yugoslavs = 42,382 (6.5%)
- Romanians = 35,935 (5.5%)
- Slovaks = 19,903 (3%)

== 2002 ==
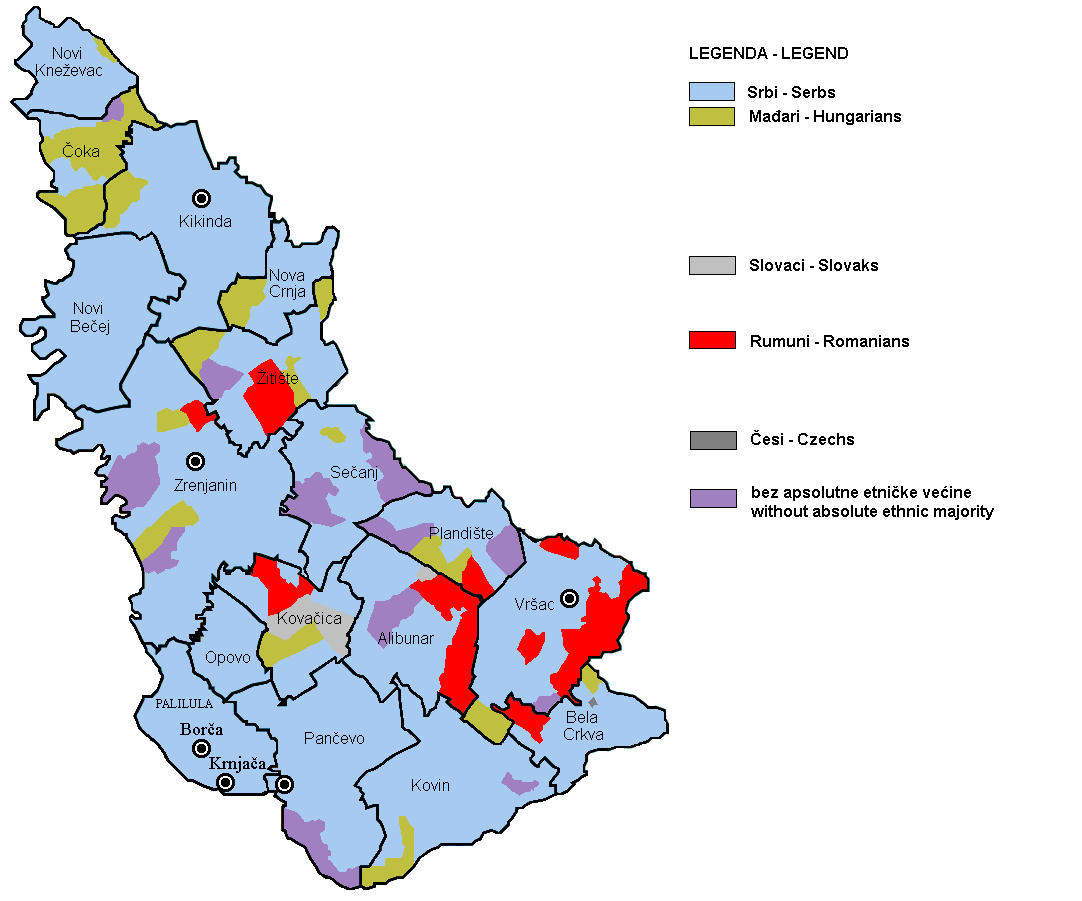
Ethnic map of Serbian Banat in 2002

According to the 2002 census, the territory of Serbian Banat had a population of 616,202 inhabitants, composed of:

- Serbs = 435,577 (70.7%)
- Hungarians = 62,890 (10.2%)
- Romanians = 27,661 (4.1%)
- Slovaks = 17,994 (2.7%)

== 2011 ==
According to the 2011 census, the territory of Serbian Banat had a population of 534,875 inhabitants, composed of:

- Serbs = 398,454 (74.5%)
- Hungarians = 52,892 (9.9%)
- Romanians = 22,353 (4.1%)
- Roma = 18,547 (3.4%)
- Slovaks = 16,063 (3%)
- Macedonians = 7,236 (1.3%)

== 2022 ==
According to the 2022 census, the territory of Serbian Banat had a population of 484,464 inhabitants, composed of:

- Serbs = 348,942 (72%)
- Hungarians = 35,194 (7.2%)
- Romanians = 17,262 (3.5%)
- Roma = 17,075 (3.5%)
- Slovaks = 12,684 (2.6%)

Note: figures above don't include data for municipalities of Ada, Kanjiža, and Senta, that are geographically part of Bačka (although administratively part of North Banat District) nor the settlements of Besni Fok, Borča, Krnjača, Kovilovo, Ovča, and Padinska Skela, that are administratively part of City of Belgrade.

== See also ==
- Demographic history of Vojvodina
- Demographic history of Serbia
