= Corrigan (surname) =

- Language: Irish

Origin
- Meaning: "descendant of Corragán"
- Region of origin: Ireland

Other names
- Variant forms: Currigan, Carrigan

The Corrigan (O'Corrigan, Carrigan, Corocan, Courigan, Currigan) surname is of Irish origin. Corrigan means a "Spear" in Irish. It is believed to have originated from Coirdhecan in Tír Eoghain. It is also believed to be connected to the Maguire clan. The Corrigan surname was common in the 17th century in County Fermanagh. Today it has spread across most of Ireland, Scotland and to the United States and Canada.

The Irish sept Ó Corragáin, whose stronghold was in County Fermanagh, is the origin of the names Corrigan, Carrigan, Courigan, Corgan, and Currigan. Early records in the Annals of the Four Masters indicate the name was associated with clerics and abbots. It was well established during the Middle Ages, spreading south into the counties of Monaghan, Meath, Roscommon and Offaly. The village of Ballycorrigan near Nenagh in County Tipperary indicates the name also spread to that county.

According to historian C. Thomas Cairney, the O'Corrigans were a chiefly family of the Oirghialla or Airgíalla tribe who were in turn from the Laigin tribe who were the third wave of Celts to settle in Ireland during the first century BC.

A Corrigan coat of arms consists of a chevron between two trefoils slipt, in chief and in base a wingless dragon passant vert. The motto is: Consilio et Impetu (English: By counsel and Force).

== Persons with the surname Corrigan ==
- Bill Corrigan, American politician and lawyer
- Brad Corrigan (born 1974), musician
- Brent Corrigan (born 1986), also known by his real name Sean Paul Lockhart, American model, film actor and gay pornographic actor
- Briana Corrigan (born 1965), Northern Irish singer
- Bryony Corrigan (born 1992), English actress
- Carol Corrigan (born 1948), associate justice of the California Supreme Court
- Christa McAuliffe nee Corrigan (1948–1986), astronaut
- Ray "Crash" Corrigan (1902–1976), American actor
- D'Arcy Corrigan (1870–1945), Irish lawyer who became a character actor in many films
- Dennis Corrigan (born 1944), American illustrator
- Derek Corrigan, Mayor of the City of Burnaby, BC, Canada
- Sir Dominic Corrigan (1802–1880), Irish physician
- Dominic Corrigan (Gaelic footballer), born 1962
- Douglas Corrigan (1907–1995) (known as "Wrong Way" Corrigan), American aviator
- E. Gerald Corrigan (1941–2022), American banker
- Ed Corrigan (born 1946), British mathematician and theoretical physicist
- Edward C. Corrigan (1843–1924), American horse racing executive
- Felicitas Corrigan (1908–2003), nun, author, and humanitarian
- Gene Corrigan (1928–2020), American lacrosse player, coach, and college athletics administrator
- Gordon Corrigan (born 1942), British military historian
- Jack Corrigan (lawyer) (born 1956), American lawyer
- Jack Corrigan (sportscaster) (born 1952), American sportscaster
- Joe Corrigan (born 1948), British soccer player
- John Corrigan (born 1952), American religion scholar
- Joseph M. Corrigan (1879–1942), American Catholic bishop and academic
- Kathleen Corrigan (1945–2025), American gymnast
- Kelly Corrigan (born 1967), American author
- Kevin Corrigan (born 1969), American actor
- Lisa M. Corrigan, American academic
- Lloyd Corrigan (1900–1969), American film actor, producer, screenwriter and director
- Mairead Corrigan Maguire (born 1944), Northern Irish activist and co-founder of the Community of Peace People
- Martin Corrigan, lead singer of the band Alloy Mental
- Martyn Corrigan, (born 1977), Scottish football player
- Maura D. Corrigan (born 1948), Michigan-based American public administrator
- Archbishop Michael Corrigan (1839–1902) of the diocese of New York
- Michelle Corrigan, fictional character from Doctors
- Peter Corrigan (1941–2016), Australian architect
- Reggie Corrigan (born 1970), Irish rugby union footballer
- Robert A. Corrigan (born 1935), former president of San Francisco State University
- Ross Corrigan (born 1999), Irish rower
- Timothy Corrigan (born 1956), Chief judge of the United States District Court for the Middle District of Florida
- Tomás Corrigan (born 1990), Gaelic footballer
- Tommy Corrigan (1903–1943), Australian rules footballer and soldier
- Wilfred Corrigan, British engineer and entrepreneur, founder of LSI Logic Corp.

== Persons with the surname Corgan ==
- Billy Corgan (born 1967), lead musician for the alternative rock band The Smashing Pumpkins

== Fictional characters ==
- Corrigan, the main antagonist of the video game Driver: Parallel Lines
- Atlas Corrigan, character in Colleen Hoover's novel It Ends with Us
- Emma Corrigan, the principal character from Sophie Kinsella's novel Can You Keep A Secret?
- Jim Corrigan, the name of three fictional characters that have appeared in comic books published by DC Comics
- Jimmy Corrigan, from the graphic novel Jimmy Corrigan, the Smartest Kid on Earth
- John Corrigan, main character from Colum McCann's novel Let the Great World Spin
- Kate Corrigan, from the comic book Hellboy
- Mark Corrigan, character in the British television series Peep Show
- Michael Corrigan, the plot driving character from the hit Netflix original series House of Cards
- Phil Corrigan, main character of the comic strip Secret Agent X-9

== See also ==
- Corrigan (disambiguation)
- Currigan
- Carrigan
- Korrigan
- Irish clans
