= 2008 in baseball =

The following are the baseball events of the year 2008 throughout the world.

== Champions ==
=== Major League Baseball ===
- Regular Season Champions

League	Eastern Division Champions	Central Division Champions	Western Division Champions	Wild Card Qualifier
American League	Tampa Bay Rays	Chicago White Sox	Los Angeles Angels of Anaheim	Boston Red Sox
National League	Philadelphia Phillies	Chicago Cubs	Los Angeles Dodgers	Milwaukee Brewers

- World Series Champions – Philadelphia Phillies
  - American League Champions – Tampa Bay Rays
  - National League Champions – Philadelphia Phillies
- Postseason – October 1 to October 29

Division Series (ALDS, NLDS)
1	LA Angels	1
4	Boston	3
American League
2	Tampa Bay	3
3	Chicago White Sox	1
1	Chicago Cubs	0
3	LA Dodgers	3
National League
2	Philadelphia	3
4	Milwaukee	1

League Championship Series (NLCS, ALCS)
4	Boston	3
2	Tampa Bay	4
3	LA Dodgers	1
2	Philadelphia	4

World Series
AL2	Tampa Bay	1
NL2	Philadelphia	4

Higher seed had home field advantage during Division Series and League Championship Series.
The American League champion has home field advantage during the World Series as a result of the AL victory in the All-Star Game.

=== Other champions ===
- Minor League Baseball
  - Triple-A Championship: Sacramento River Cats (Athletics)
    - International League: Scranton/Wilkes Barre Yankees (Yankees)
    - Pacific Coast League: Sacramento River Cats (Athletics)
    - Mexican League: Diablos Rojos del México
  - AA
    - Eastern League: Trenton Thunder (Yankees)
    - Southern League: Mississippi Braves (Braves)
    - Texas League: Arkansas Travelers (Angels)
  - A
    - California League: Stockton Ports (Athletics)
    - Carolina League: Potomac Nationals (Nationals)
    - Florida State League: Daytona Cubs (Cubs)
    - Midwest League: Burlington Bees (Royals)
    - South Atlantic League: Augusta GreenJackets (Giants)
    - New York–Penn League: Batavia Muckdogs (Cardinals)
    - Northwest League: Spokane Indians (Rangers)
  - Rookie
    - Appalachian League: Elizabethton Twins (Twins)
    - Gulf Coast League: Gulf Coast Phillies (Phillies)
    - Pioneer League: Great Falls Voyagers (White Sox)
    - Arizona League: Arizona League Giants (Giants)
- Independent baseball leagues
  - Alaska Baseball League: Anchorage Glacier Pilots
  - American Association: Sioux Falls Canaries
  - Atlantic League: Somerset Patriots
  - Canadian-American Association: Sussex Skyhawks
  - Frontier League: Windy City ThunderBolts
  - Golden Baseball League: Orange County Flyers
  - Northern League: Kansas City T-Bones
  - United League Baseball: Amarillo Dillas
- Amateur
  - College
    - College World Series: Fresno State
    - NCAA Division II: Mount Olive College
    - NCAA Division III: Trinity College
    - NAIA: Lewis-Clark State College
  - Youth
    - Big League World Series: Taylors, South Carolina
    - Junior League World Series: Waipi`o, Hawaii
    - Little League World Series: Willemstad, Curaçao
    - Senior League World Series: Upper Deerfield, New Jersey
- International
  - National teams
    - Summer Olympics at Beijing, China: South Korea (gold); Cuba (silver); United States (bronze)
    - World Junior Baseball Championship: South Korea
  - International club team competitions
    - Caribbean Series: Tigres del Licey, Dominican Republic
    - European Cup: Kinheim, Netherlands
    - Asia Series: Saitama Seibu Lions, Japan
  - Domestic leagues
    - Australia – Claxton Shield: Perth Heat
    - China Baseball League: Tianjin Lions
    - Cuban National Series: Santiago de Cuba
    - Dominican League: Águilas Cibaeñas
    - France – Division Elite: Rouen Baseball 76
    - Holland Series: Amsterdam Pirates
    - Italy – Serie A1: San Marino
    - Japan Series: Saitama Seibu Lions
      - Central League: Yomiuri Giants (Climax Series Champion – Yomiuri Giants)
      - Pacific League: Saitama Seibu Lions (Climax Series Champion – Saitama Seibu Lions)
      - Eastern League (Minor): Tokyo Yakult Swallows
      - Western League (Minor): Fukuoka SoftBank Hawks
    - Korean Series: SK Wyverns
    - Mexican Pacific League: Yaquis de Obregón
    - Taiwan Series: Uni-President Lions
    - Venezuelan League: Tigres de Aragua

== Awards and honors ==
- Baseball Hall of Fame honors
  - Rich "Goose" Gossage is elected by the BBWAA in his ninth year of eligibility. Executives Barney Dreyfuss, Bowie Kuhn and Walter O'Malley and managers Billy Southworth and Dick Williams are also inducted following their election by the Veterans Committee.
  - Larry Whiteside, sportswriter for The Boston Globe from 1973 until 2004, receives the J. G. Taylor Spink Award.
  - Dave Niehaus, broadcaster for the Seattle Mariners since 1977, receives the Ford C. Frick Award.
- MVP Awards
  - American League – Dustin Pedroia (BOS)
  - National League – Albert Pujols (STL)
- Cy Young Awards
  - American League – Cliff Lee (CLE)
  - National League – Tim Lincecum (SF)
- Rookie of the Year Awards
  - American League Evan Longoria (TB)
  - National League Geovany Soto (CHC)
- Manager of the Year Awards
  - American League – Joe Maddon (TB)
  - National League – Lou Piniella (CHC)
- Silver Slugger Awards
  American League
  DH: Aubrey Huff (BAL)
  C: Joe Mauer (MIN)
  1B: Justin Morneau (MIN)
  2B: Dustin Pedroia (BOS)
  3B: Alex Rodriguez (NYY)
  SS: Derek Jeter (NYY)
  OF: Josh Hamilton (TEX)
  OF: Carlos Quentin (CWS)
  OF: Grady Sizemore (CLE)

National League
P: Carlos Zambrano (CHC)
C: Brian McCann (ATL)
1B: Albert Pujols (STL)
2B: Chase Utley (PHI)
3B: David Wright (NYM)
SS: Hanley Ramírez (FLA)
OF: Ryan Braun (MIL)
OF: Matt Holliday (COL)
OF: Ryan Ludwick (STL)

- Gold Glove Awards
  American League
  P: Mike Mussina (NYY)
  C: Joe Mauer (MIN)
  1B: Carlos Peña (TB)
  2B: Dustin Pedroia (BOS)
  3B: Adrián Beltré (SEA)
  SS: Michael Young (TEX)
  OF: Torii Hunter (LAA)
  OF: Grady Sizemore (CLE)
  OF: Ichiro Suzuki (SEA)

National League
P: Greg Maddux (SD/LAD)
C: Yadier Molina (STL)
1B: Adrián González (SD)
2B: Brandon Phillips (CIN)
3B: David Wright (NYM)
SS: Jimmy Rollins (PHI)
OF: Carlos Beltrán (NYM)
OF: Nate McLouth (PIT)
OF: Shane Victorino (PHI)

=== Others ===
- Hank Aaron Award – Kevin Youkilis (AL, BOS) / Aramis Ramírez (NL, CHC)
- Hutch Award – Jon Lester (BOS)
- Players Choice Award – Albert Pujols (STL)
- Roberto Clemente Award – Albert Pujols (STL)
- Tony Conigliaro Award – Rocco Baldelli (TB)
- TSN Awards
  - MLB Player of the Year – Albert Pujols (STL)
  - Pitcher of the Year – Cliff Lee (AL, CLE) / Tim Lincecum (NL, SF)
  - Reliever of the Year – Francisco Rodríguez (AL, LAA) / Brad Lidge (NL, PHI)
  - Rookie of the Year – Evan Longoria (AL, TB) / Geovany Soto (NL, CHC)
  - Comeback Player of the Year – Cliff Lee (AL, CLE) / Fernando Tatís (NL, NYM)
  - Manager of the Year – Joe Maddon (AL, TB) / Fredi González (NL, FLA)
- Woman Executive of the Year (major or minor league): Carol Gehr, Hagerstown Suns, South Atlantic League

== Events ==
=== January ===
- January 6 – Roger Clemens appears on CBS's 60 Minutes, denying that he ever uses performance-enhancing drugs.
- January 8 – Closer Rich "Goose" Gossage and his former manager with the San Diego Padres, Dick Williams, are elected into the Baseball Hall of Fame.
- January 14 - The St. Louis Cardinals acquire Troy Glaus from the Toronto Blue Jays in exchange for Scott Rolen.
- January 29 – The Minnesota Twins agree to deal Johan Santana to the New York Mets for outfielder Carlos Gómez and pitchers Deolis Guerra, Philip Humber and Kevin Mulvey.

=== February ===
- February 1 – Chuck Knoblauch speaks to the House Oversight and Government Reform Committee investigating the use of performance-enhancing drugs in Major League Baseball.
- February 2 – The deal between the Mets and Twins for Johan Santana is finalized.
- February 4 – New York Yankees pitcher Andy Pettitte meets for nearly three hours in a closed-door interview in Washington, D.C., with lawyers from a congressional committee investigating the use of performance-enhancing drugs in Major League Baseball. After the Mitchell Report's release in December, Pettitte confirms Brian McNamee's testimony that the hurler used human growth hormone twice during the 2002 season while recuperating from injury.
- February 13 – Roger Clemens testifies under oath at a Congressional hearing that he has never used performance-enhancing drugs.

=== March ===
- March 15 – The Los Angeles Dodgers and San Diego Padres play to a 3–3 tie in the first major league game ever played in China. The game is played at Wukesong Stadium in Beijing, site of the baseball competition for the 2008 Olympics. The teams meet again the next day, with the Padres winning 6–3.
- March 17 – The Dodgers depart their Dodgertown complex in Vero Beach, Florida, after 60 years of use. Hall of Fame manager Tommy Lasorda manages the team in its final week's games, as regular manager Joe Torre is with the portion of the club that travels to China.
- March 18 – The New York Yankees play an exhibition at Virginia Tech's English Field to commemorate the April 2007 campus shootings.
- March 19 – The first ever night game is played at McKechnie Field, which was the last stadium used by a major league team, at any time of the year, to lack lights. The stadium had that distinction since 1988, when the first night game is played at Wrigley Field. The New York Yankees defeat the Pittsburgh Pirates, 12–9, in the debut.
- March 25 – Opening Day takes place on the earliest date in history, with the Boston Red Sox defeating the Oakland Athletics 6–5 in 10 innings in Tokyo, Japan.
- March 29:
  - Celebrating the 50th anniversary of their move to Los Angeles, the Dodgers play an exhibition against the Red Sox at their first Los Angeles home, the Los Angeles Memorial Coliseum, losing 7–4 before an announced crowd of 115,300.
  - In the second annual Civil Rights Game, the New York Mets defeat the Chicago White Sox, 3–2, at AutoZone Park in Memphis, Tennessee.
- March 30 – In the first-ever game played at Nationals Park, on Opening Night, President George W. Bush throws out the first pitch and Ryan Zimmerman hits a walk-off home run to give the Washington Nationals a 3–2 win over the Atlanta Braves.
- March 31:
  - A statue of Chicago Cubs great Ernie Banks is unveiled outside Wrigley Field.
  - Japanese sensation Kosuke Fukudome makes his major league debut with the Cubs, hitting a double on his first pitch. He later ties the game with a three-run homer in the 9th inning.
  - The independent South Coast League suspends its operations after only one season of play.

=== April ===
- April 2 – With his 194th consecutive game without an error, Red Sox first baseman Kevin Youkilis surpasses Steve Garvey's major league record (set from 1983 to 1985) for an errorless streak at first base; the streak began on July 5, 2006. He is given the first base bag from the game against the Athletics.
- April 4 – The Florida State League's Fort Myers Miracle team wears Lee County Sheriff's Office caps in a game against the Sarasota Reds in honor of fallen Lieutenant Mark Niedermeyer. On March 21, Lieutenant Niedermeyer, a 14-year LCSO veteran, collapsed and died on the field during LCS's annual charity arena football game against Lee County firefighters. Following the game (won 6–3 by the Miracle), the team autographed the hats, and they were auctioned off. The auction raised $2,500, with all proceeds raised from the hat auction going directly to Lieutenant Niedermeyer's family.
- April 8:
  - Chase Utley of the Phillies ties a major league record by being hit by pitches three times in a 5–2 win over the Mets.
  - Plácido Polanco's record streaks of 186 games and 911 chances at second base without an error come to an end with a throwing error in the third inning of the Tigers' 5–0 loss to the Red Sox; his last error was on July 1, 2006.
- April 9 – Iván Rodríguez becomes the first catcher in major league history to collect 2,500 hits, reaching the milestone with a single in the eighth inning of the Tigers' 7–2 win over the Red Sox.
- April 11 – The Florida Marlins set a team record by hitting six home runs in their 10–6 win over the Astros.
- April 12 – The home run ball which Barry Bonds had hit for his record 762nd home run is auctioned for $376,612 to an anonymous bidder.
- April 13 – Joe Crede and Paul Konerko both hit grand slams as the White Sox beat the Tigers 11–0.
- April 15 – José López becomes the 12th player in major league history to collect three sacrifice flies in one game, in the Mariners' 11–6 win over the Royals.
- April 17:
  - At Petco Park, the Colorado Rockies defeat the San Diego Padres 2–1 in 22 innings, in a game that lasts 6 hours and 16 minutes and ends at 1:21 a.m. after Troy Tulowitzki's RBI double with two out in the top of the inning drives in an unearned run. Inning-wise, the game is the longest in the majors since another 22-inning contest on August 21, 1993, the longest in the history of both teams and the longest in Petco Park's 5-year history.
  - Chipper Jones, Mark Teixeira and Brian McCann hit consecutive home runs in the fifth inning of the Braves' 8–0 win over the Marlins.
- April 21 – Chase Utley ties a Phillies record by homering in his fifth consecutive game.
- April 22 – John Smoltz becomes the 16th major league pitcher to record 3,000 strikeouts, retiring Nationals pitcher John Lannan in the third inning at Turner Field, but Lannan earns the victory as Washington wins 6–0.
- April 23 – The Chicago Cubs become the second major league franchise to record 10,000 victories (joining the Giants), with a 7–6 win over the Rockies in 10 innings.
- April 24 – A David Ortiz Red Sox jersey which is exhumed from the construction site of New Yankee Stadium eleven days earlier after a foiled jinx attempt is auctioned for $175,100, with the proceeds going to a Red Sox-affiliated charity.
- April 25 - The Kansas City Royals released pitcher Hideo Nomo. Nomo would never pitch in the major leagues again.

=== May ===
- May 2:
  - Miguel Tejada, Lance Berkman and Carlos Lee hit consecutive home runs in the sixth inning of the Astros' 7–4 win over the Brewers.
  - José Reyes falls a home run short of the cycle when he is thrown out at the plate, while trying to stretch his second triple of the game into an inside-the-park home run, in the eighth inning of the Mets' 7–2 win over the Diamondbacks.
- May 6:
  - Gavin Floyd of the White Sox takes a no-hitter into the ninth inning against the Twins before giving up a double to Joe Mauer with one out; Floyd and Bobby Jenks settle for a combined 7–1 one-hitter.
  - Lance Berkman has five hits in the Astros' 6–5 win over the Nationals, tying the team record for a nine-inning game.
- May 7:
  - Carlos Gómez of the Twins hits for the cycle in a 13–1 win against the White Sox. He is just the fourth player in history to cycle in reverse natural order, joining Gee Walker (1937), Jim Fregosi (1968) and Luke Scott (2006). At age 22, he is the third youngest to hit for the cycle.
  - The Cincinnati Reds hit seven home runs, including three by Joey Votto, in a 9–0 victory over the Cubs; Jon Lieber surrenders four homers in the second inning.
- May 9:
  - James Shields of the Rays pitches a 2–0 one-hitter against the Angels, allowing only Brandon Wood's one-out single in the third inning; Evan Longoria provides the scoring with a two-run walk-off home run.
  - Kenny Rogers picks off his 92nd career baserunner, setting a major league record since the statistic is first kept in 1974, in the Tigers' 6–5 win over the Yankees, catching Wilson Betemit in the second inning; the mark was previously held by Mark Langston.
- May 10:
  - In his fifth try, Greg Maddux of the Padres becomes the ninth pitcher to win 350 career games, with a 3–2 decision against the Rockies.
  - Ben Sheets breaks Teddy Higuera's team record of 1,081 career strikeouts in the Brewers' 5–3 loss to the Cardinals.
- May 11 – The Cincinnati Reds bat out of order in the ninth inning of their 8–3 loss to the Mets; David Ross mistakenly hits instead of Corey Patterson to lead off the inning, and Patterson is ruled out after Ross lines out to right field. Ross then bats correctly, singling to center.
- May 12 – Indians second baseman Asdrúbal Cabrera turns the 14th unassisted triple play in major league history in the second game of a home doubleheader against the Blue Jays. He makes a diving catch of Lyle Overbay's fifth-inning line drive for the first out, steps on second to double up Kevin Mench, then tags out Marco Scutaro, who passes second base. Cleveland loses, 3–0, in 10 innings. Ron Hansen, who accomplished the feat in 1968, is in attendance as a scout.
- May 16:
  - Jayson Werth hits three home runs, including a grand slam, in the Phillies' 10–3 win over the Blue Jays, tying a team record with eight runs batted in.
  - Josh Hamilton gets five hits in the Rangers' 16–8 win over the Astros, tying a team record for a nine-inning game, and misses the cycle by hitting two home runs but no double. In the same game, the Astros' Shawn Chacón sets a major league record by getting no decision in his ninth consecutive start to begin the season; the streak ends when he wins his next start against the Cubs five days later.
- May 17 – Chan Ho Park of South Korea, Hong-Chih Kuo of Taiwan and Takashi Saito of Japan combine to pitch the Dodgers to a 6–3 win over the Angels, marking the first time that pitchers from three different Asian countries have appeared in a game for one team.
- May 18:
  - After tying the record the previous night, Ichiro Suzuki sets a Mariners record with his 291st stolen base for the team, breaking the mark held by Julio Cruz.
  - The Cardinals rededicate the statue of Stan Musial at the west entrance to Busch Stadium, five days after the 50th anniversary of his 3,000th hit, with an adjacent street being renamed Stan Musial Drive.
- May 19:
  - Jon Lester of the Red Sox pitches a 7–0 no-hitter against the Royals. His first complete game in the majors, it is the fourth no-hitter by a Red Sox pitcher since 2001, the first by a Red Sox left-hander since Mel Parnell in 1956, the fourth ever by a left-hander at Fenway Park (and the first since Parnell's), and only the second against the Royals (Nolan Ryan, 1973). It is also the fourth no-hitter caught by Jason Varitek, who homers in the game; he also caught the Red Sox' three previous no-hitters: Hideo Nomo (2001), Derek Lowe (2002) and Clay Buchholz (2007). Varitek's feat sets a major league record (under the rules in force during his career Ray Schalk caught four, but one was disallowed in 1991 when the definition of a no-hitter was changed).
  - Adam Dunn ties a Reds record by homering in his fifth consecutive game, a 6–5 loss to the Dodgers.
  - Minnesota Twins relief pitcher Bobby Korecky singles in the tenth inning to become the only Twins pitcher to get a hit in the Metrodome during its existence (1982–2009). Korecky also wins the game, his first-ever major league win.
- May 20 – 12-time All-Star catcher Mike Piazza announces his retirement.
- May 22 – J. D. Drew and Mike Lowell both hit grand slams in the Red Sox' 11–8 win over the Royals.
- May 24:
  - Oakland's Justin Duchscherer and Huston Street combine for a 3–0 one-hitter over the Red Sox, with Duchsherer allowing only a single by David Ortiz with one out in the seventh inning.
  - Clayton Kershaw makes his debut for the Los Angeles Dodgers.
- May 25 – Playing in both games of a doubleheader as the Giants are swept by the Marlins, Omar Vizquel breaks Luis Aparicio's major league record of 2,583 career games as a shortstop.
- May 27:
  - In a 9–6 win over the Pirates, Adam Dunn hits a three-run home run, his 252nd home run for the Reds, breaking Ted Kluszewski's team record for homers by a left-handed hitter.
  - In their 8–2 win over the White Sox, the Indians pull off the first triple steal in the major leagues since October 1, 1987. With the bases loaded in the sixth inning, pitcher Ehren Wassermann fakes a throw to third before throwing to first, catching Jamey Carroll in a rundown. First baseman Paul Konerko tries to gun down David Dellucci at the plate, but his throw to catcher Toby Hall is off target, allowing Dellucci to score and Carroll and Grady Sizemore to advance.
  - Hunter Pence gets five hits in the Astros' 8–2 win over the Cardinals, tying the team record for a nine-inning game.
- May 30 – The Red Sox set a team record with six stolen bases in their 5–2, 13-inning win over the Orioles.
- May 31:
  - In a 6–3 win at Baltimore, Manny Ramírez of the Red Sox becomes the 24th major leaguer to hit 500 home runs, with a solo shot off Chad Bradford in the seventh inning.
  - Tony La Russa manages his 2,000th game for the Cardinals, breaking Red Schoendienst's club record.

=== June ===
- June 5 – Chipper Jones of the Braves hits his 400th career home run in their 7–5 win over the Marlins, joining Mickey Mantle and Eddie Murray as the third switch hitter to reach the milestone.
- June 7:
  - In the Red Sox' game against the Marlins, Kevin Youkilis' record streak of errorless games at first base ends at 238 games.
  - In the sixth inning of their 2–1 loss to the Padres, Mets pitchers tie a modern major league record by hitting three batters in one inning: Brian Giles, Kevin Kouzmanoff and Khalil Greene. The Padres also set a major league record with their fourth consecutive 2–1 win.
- June 9:
  - Ken Griffey Jr. of the Reds hits his 600th career home run in their 9–4 road win over the Marlins, connecting off Mark Hendrickson in the first inning. He becomes only the sixth member of the 600 home run club, joining Babe Ruth, Hank Aaron, Willie Mays, Sammy Sosa and Barry Bonds.
  - Nick Swisher hits home runs from both sides of the plate as the White Sox beat the Twins 7–5.
- June 15 – The Minnesota Twins' Scott Baker strikes out four Milwaukee Brewers batters in the third inning, becoming just the eighth American league pitcher to accomplish the feat with four consecutive strikeouts.
- June 16 – The final Hall of Fame Game, between the Cubs and Padres, is cancelled due to rain.
- June 17:
  - At 3:15 A.M. Eastern Time, the New York Mets announce the firing of manager Willie Randolph and two coaches while the team is on the West Coast, and name Jerry Manuel interim manager.
  - Marcus Thames ties a Tigers record by hitting a home run in his fifth consecutive game, in a 5–1 win over the Giants.
- June 18 – Francisco Rodríguez of the Angels allows the tying run in the ninth inning against the Mets, ending his club record streak of 25 consecutive saves; the Mets win 5–4 in 10 innings.
- June 20 – Elijah Dukes ties a Nationals record with five hits in their 4–3 win over the Rangers, with his fifth hit driving in the winning run with two out in the bottom of the 14th and the bases loaded.
- June 21:
  - Jim Edmonds hits two home runs in the fourth inning of the Cubs' 11–7 win over the White Sox.
  - Scot Shields records four strikeouts in the eighth inning of the Angels' 6–2 win over the Phillies; after he retires Greg Dobbs and Jimmy Rollins, Shane Victorino reaches first on a wild pitch in the dirt. After issuing a walk, Shields strikes out Ryan Howard to end the inning.
- June 22 – Mark Teixeira hits three home runs in the Braves' 8–3 win over the Mariners.
- June 23 – Félix Hernández of the Seattle Mariners becomes the first American League pitcher since the designated hitter rule went into effect in 1973 to hit a grand slam, off New York Mets ace Johan Santana, in Seattle's 5–2 victory. It is also the first home run ever by a Mariners pitcher.
- June 24:
  - The Baseball Hall of Fame dedicates a revised plaque for Jackie Robinson to include recognition of his cultural impact.
  - The Pirates beat the Yankees 12–5, becoming the final major league team to get its first regular season win against the Yankees.
- June 25:
  - Fresno State defeats Georgia to win the 2008 College World Series, becoming the lowest seeded team to win an NCAA postseason tournament and bringing the school its first NCAA men's team title. With a final record of 47–31, they finish with the most losses of any CWS champion.
  - Shawn Chacón of the Astros grabs general manager Ed Wade by the neck and throws him to the ground during a confrontation, resulting in his release five days later.
  - In a 5–4 loss to the Nationals, Garret Anderson breaks Tim Salmon's Angels record of 986 career runs; he ties the mark five days earlier. Also in the game, Washington's Aaron Boone becomes the fourth member of his family to collect 1,000 hits, joining his grandfather Ray, father Bob and brother Bret.
- June 26 – Matt Garza of the Rays pitches a 6–1 one-hitter over the Marlins, giving up only a home run by Hanley Ramírez to lead off the seventh inning.
- June 27:
  - Carlos Delgado sets a Mets record with nine RBI in their 15–6 win at Yankee Stadium over the Yankees, in the first game of a crosstown split doubleheader; the second game is played at Shea Stadium. The previous mark of eight RBI is set by Dave Kingman in a 1976 game.
  - The Seattle Mariners set a team record with 18 runners left on base, but still beat the Padres 5–2.
- June 28 – Jered Weaver and José Arredondo of the Los Angeles Angels of Anaheim combine to no-hit the Los Angeles Dodgers over eight innings, but lose 1–0 when the Dodgers score in the fifth inning on two errors, a stolen base and a sacrifice fly. The game is not officially recognized by Major League Baseball as a no-hitter.
- June 30 – Nick Swisher homers from both sides of the plate for the second time in the month, including a grand slam batting right-handed, as the White Sox beat the Indians 9–7.

=== July ===
- July 2 – Dustin Pedroia has four hits as the Red Sox lose 7–6 to the Rays, missing the cycle when he hits his second double of the game in the eighth inning, forgoing the necessary single.
- July 3 – Jon Lester of the Red Sox pitches a 7–0 shutout over the Yankees, becoming the first Boston left-hander since July 27, 1975 to throw a shutout at Yankee Stadium.
- July 4:
  - Ken Griffey Jr. homers in the Reds' 3–0 win over the Nationals, becoming the 18th major leaguer to hit for over 5,000 total bases.
  - The Rockies come back from trailing 13–4 in the fourth inning to beat the Marlins 18–17 on Chris Iannetta's single in the bottom of the ninth; the game sets a record for most combined runs in a contest decided on a walk-off hit, and the Marlins become the sixth team since 1900 to score 17 runs but lose.
  - In Boston's 6–4 win over the Yankees, Kevin Youkilis hits a drive to left field that pops out of Johnny Damon's glove, bounces a few times on top of the wall and then stops there for a few seconds before rolling onto the field for a two-run triple.
  - Albert Pujols hits his 300th home run in the Cardinals' 2–1 loss to the Cubs.
- July 5 – In the Yankees' 2–1 win over the Red Sox, a combined seven batters are hit, tying the modern major league record; Manny Ramírez is hit three times, tying the individual mark.
- July 6:
  - The Braves beat the Astros 7–6 in 17 innings, the longest game ever at Turner Field; Mark Teixeira's single with the bases loaded and none out drives in the winning run.
  - The Brewers tie club records with nine doubles and twelve extra base hits in their 11–6 win over the Pirates.
- July 7:
  - Hiroki Kuroda of the Dodgers pitches a 3–0 one-hitter against the Braves; Mark Teixeira, leading off the eighth inning with a double, is the only baserunner.
  - Francisco Rodríguez earns his record 35th save before the All-Star break in the Angels' 9–6 win over the Rangers, breaking John Smoltz's 2003 mark.

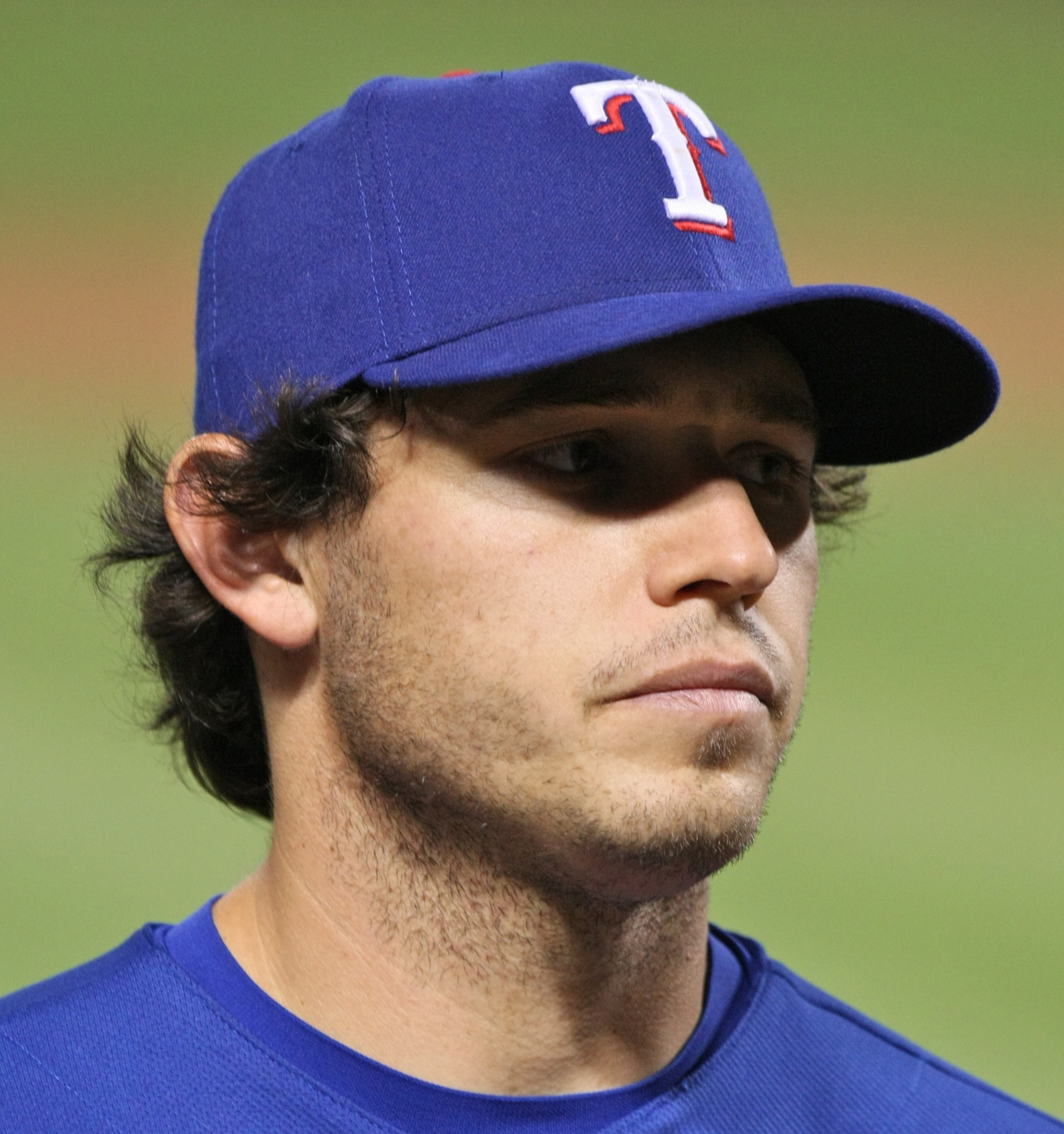
Ian Kinsler

- July 8 – Ian Kinsler ties a Rangers record by scoring in his 11th consecutive game.
- July 10 – John Lackey of the Angels gives up 15 hits in the team's 11–10, 11-inning win over the Rangers, tying the team record set by Paul Hartzell on September 9, 1976.
- July 12:
  - Pedro Martínez, Carlos Muñiz, Aaron Heilman, Scott Schoeneweis and Billy Wagner combine for a one-hitter in the Mets' 3–0 win over the Rockies, with Martínez allowing only Brad Hawpe's single in the fourth inning.
  - Andruw Jones ties a Dodgers record by striking out five times in their 5–3, 11-inning loss to the Marlins.
- July 13 – CC Sabathia hits a home run in the Brewers' 3–2 win over the Reds, becoming the first pitcher since Earl Wilson in 1970 to hit home runs in both leagues in one season; Sabathia previously homered on June 21 during an Indians road win against the Dodgers.
- July 15 – The American League wins the 79th All-Star Game at Yankee Stadium, 4–3; the AL puts the winning run in scoring position in every inning from the 10th through 13th, finally scoring Justin Morneau on Michael Young's sacrifice fly with the bases loaded in the 15th inning. The game ties the All-Star record for most innings, and is the longest All-Star Game by time at 4 hours, 50 minutes. NL second baseman Dan Uggla sets an All-Star record with three errors, and the teams combine for record totals of stolen bases (7), pitchers (23) and strikeouts (34). It is the AL's first victory in the 11 All-Star Games which go to extra innings.
- July 19 – Jeff Kent homers in the Dodgers' 3–2 loss to the Diamondbacks, making him the 48th major league player to collect 1,500 RBI, with Nap Lajoie and Rogers Hornsby being the only other second basemen to reach the milestone.
- July 20 – The White Sox unveil a statue of Harold Baines at U.S. Cellular Field, the seventh statue on the ballpark's outfield concourse.
- July 21 – In the Diamondbacks' 2–0 win over the Cubs, Randy Johnson records his 2,000th strikeout with the team, becoming the first pitcher in history to do so with two different clubs; he also runs his career record against the Cubs to 13–0, with Sal Maglie being the only other pitcher to post 10 wins without a defeat against Chicago.
- July 22:
  - Rick VandenHurk, Joe Nelson, Renyel Pinto and Matt Lindstrom of the Marlins combine for a 4–0 one-hitter against the Braves, with Nelson allowing only a single by Chipper Jones leading off the sixth inning.
  - Rookie Brad Ziegler of the A's pitches two scoreless innings to extend his career-opening shutout streak to 23 2/3 innings, breaking the AL record of 22 set by Boston's Dave "Boo" Ferriss in 1945.
- July 23 – In the Angels' 14–11 win over the Indians, Casey Kotchman gets five hits, and Howie Kendrick ties a team mark with three doubles among his four hits; Jeff Mathis also collects four hits, including his first career grand slam, marking the first time in team history that three players do so in a nine-inning contest.
- July 24 – The Milwaukee Brewers break their 1996 club record by getting a home run in their 20th consecutive game; the streak ends in the next day's 3–1 loss to the Astros.
- July 26 – Skip Schumaker ties a Cardinals record with six hits in their 10–8, 14-inning win over the Mets, and is on base when Albert Pujols provides the winning margin with a two-run home run in the top of the 14th, his fifth hit of the game.
- July 27:
  - Two days after tying the previous mark, Brad Ziegler of the A's sets a major league record with 27 consecutive shutout innings to begin his career, breaking the record of 25 set by George McQuillan with the 1907 Phillies.
  - The Phillies allow the Braves to take a 5–0 lead, then move ahead 12–5 before holding off a rally to win 12–10. It is the first time since August 3, 1958 that a team scores the game's first five runs and last five runs yet loses.
- July 28 – Greg Maddux of the Padres earns an 8–5 win over the Diamondbacks, ending his career-worst streak of 14 starts without a victory.
- July 29 – John Lackey of the Angels takes a no-hitter into the ninth inning against the Red Sox before allowing a Dustin Pedroia single and Kevin Youkilis home run with one out, and settles for a two-hit 6–2 win.
- July 30 – Kelly Shoppach of the Indians hits two home runs and three doubles in a 14–12, 13-inning loss to the Tigers, tying the major league record of five extra base hits in a game; his 9th-inning homer ties the game, though he strikes out with the bases loaded and none out in the bottom of the 12th. The game also ties the modern record for most combined players collecting four or more hits, with the Tigers' Curtis Granderson also collecting five while Ben Francisco and Asdrúbal Cabrera of the Indians and Gary Sheffield of the Tigers each get four.
- July 31:
  - Major deals made before the trading deadline include Manny Ramirez being sent from the Red Sox to the Dodgers, and Ken Griffey Jr. being traded from the Reds to the White Sox, one day after Iván Rodríguez was sent from the Tigers to the Yankees.
  - Twins manager Ron Gardenhire is ejected for arguing a strikeout call in the seventh inning of a 10–6 win over the White Sox, prompting a game delay of several minutes as fans throw baseballs and hats onto the field; Gardenhire is later suspended for one game.

=== August ===
- August 2 – In their 9–7 win over the White Sox, the Royals tie a club record by having five players collect three hits each: Mike Avilés, Esteban Germán, Billy Butler, Miguel Olivo and Ross Gload.
- August 3 – Royals catcher Miguel Olivo charges White Sox pitcher D. J. Carrasco on the mound after being hit by a pitch in the fifth inning; although the Royals lead 6–0 and the bases are loaded, forcing in a run, Olivo insists that it was an intentional move. A brawl ensues, followed by a hit Chicago batter in the seventh inning, resulting in ejections for Olivo, both pitchers and both managers, and suspensions for all but Carrasco; although he states that it is not the case in this instance, Chicago manager Ozzie Guillén draws criticism afterward for indicating that he sometimes orders batters to be hit.
- August 4 – The Mariners score ten runs in the seventh inning, coming back to beat the Twins 11–6. Raúl Ibañez ties an AL record with six RBIs in the inning, including a grand slam, breaking the Mariners record of five set by Ken Griffey Jr. on April 29, 1999.
- August 5 – In Tampa Bay's 8–4 win over the Indians, Evan Longoria sets a team record for rookies with his 22nd home run, breaking Jonny Gomes' mark set in 2005.
- August 6 – Ryan Ludwick ties a Cardinals record by homering in his fifth consecutive game, in their 9–6 win over the Dodgers.
- August 10:
  - With 45 games remaining in the season, the Tampa Bay Rays set a franchise record with their 71st victory, an 11–3 road win over the Mariners.
  - Ian Kinsler gets five hits in the Rangers' 15–7 win over the Orioles, tying the team record for a nine-inning game.
  - Greg Dobbs of the Phillies collects his 21st pinch hit of the season, breaking the team record set by Doc Miller in 1913.
- August 12:
  - At Fenway Park, the Boston Red Sox beat the Texas Rangers, 19–17, blowing a 10–0 first-inning deficit and later when the Rangers take a 15–14 lead in the sixth inning. But the Sox responded, coming back to win with four runs in the eighth, prevailing ultimately on a Kevin Youkilis three-run home run with two outs in the inning. David Ortiz hits a pair of three-run homers in the first-inning barrage and scored four times, while Marlon Byrd tied a Texas record with five hits in a nine-inning game. Besides, Rangers starter Scott Feldman became the first major league pitcher to allow 12 runs and not take the loss since Gene Packard of the St. Louis Cardinals got the win in a 16–12 victory over the Philadelphia Phillies on August 3, 1918. The 36 runs tied a 58-year-old record for most runs scored in an American League game, which was set on June 29, 1950, when the Red Sox beat the Philadelphia Athletics 22–14. The teams totaled 37 hits.
  - Four days after tying the record, Brad Ziegler sets an Oakland record (though not an all-time Athletics record) with 38 consecutive shutout innings, breaking Mike Torrez's 1976 mark of 37.
- August 13 – In the sixth inning of their 6–2 loss to the Astros, Giants pitchers tied a modern major league record by hitting three batters in one inning: Humberto Quintero, Ty Wigginton and Mark Loretta.
- August 14:
  - In the Rays' 7–6 victory over the host Athletics, B. J. Upton hits an RBI double in the ninth inning off reliever Brad Ziegler to end his record scoreless streak at 39 innings. Ziegler, who began the season in the minors, posts numerous records including the most shutout innings by any pitcher to start a major league career (including the eighth inning of this game), and ties the major league single-season record for consecutive scoreless innings by a reliever, set by Cleveland's Al Benton in 1949.
  - In their 9–2 win over the visiting Royals, the White Sox become the sixth team in major league history to hit four consecutive home runs, with Jim Thome, Paul Konerko, Alexei Ramírez and Juan Uribe connecting in the sixth inning. Chicago's Carlos Quentin is hit by a pitch for the sixth straight game, marking the longest such streak in the major leagues since at least 1920; the streak ends the next day.
  - Mark Kotsay becomes the first Braves player to hit for the cycle since Albert Hall in 1987. His 7th-inning double that completes the cycle against the Cubs is also Kotsay's 1,500th career hit.
  - In the Reds' 3–1 win over the Pirates, Francisco Cordero becomes the 37th pitcher to earn 200 career saves.
- August 15 – In the Rockies' 4–3 win over the Nationals, Willy Taveras steals his 54th base of the year, breaking Eric Young's team record set in 1996.
- August 16 – Miguel Montero and Chris Young both hit grand slams in the Diamondbacks' 11–5 win over the Astros, marking the first such occurrence in team history.
- August 17:
  - Needing only a triple to hit for the cycle, Melvin Mora instead hits an additional double and home run in his last two at-bats as the Orioles win 16–8 at Detroit.
  - Alex Ríos gets five hits in the Blue Jays' 15–4 win over the Red Sox, tying a team record with four doubles; Toronto also sets a new team record with ten doubles.
  - After Craig Biggio's number is retired by the Astros in a pre-game ceremony, Roy Oswalt and José Valverde combine for a 3–0 two-hitter against the Diamondbacks, with Stephen Drew's singles in the third and ninth innings being the only blemishes.
  - In the Mariners' 11–8 loss at Minnesota, Seattle's R. A. Dickey ties a modern major league record by throwing four wild pitches in the fifth inning.
  - In the Rays' 7–4 win at Texas, Josh Hamilton of the Rangers is walked intentionally with the bases loaded in the ninth inning, only the fifth known use of the strategy since 1900.
- August 19 – Ricky Nolasco of the Florida Marlins pitches a 6–0 two-hitter against the Giants, ending Florida's major league record streak of 301 games without a complete game since September 16, 2006. Nolasco allows only a disputed infield single off the shortstop's glove in the first inning, as well as a ninth-inning double.
- August 20 – Francisco Rodríguez earns his 48th save in the Angels' 5–4 win over the Rays, breaking his own 2006 team record.
- August 23 – South Korea upsets Cuba 3–2 to win the gold medal at the Summer Olympics in Beijing. The sport does not return at the 2012 Summer Olympics in London.
- August 28 – The use of instant replay begins in Major League Baseball.

=== September ===
- September 1 – The Diamondbacks' Stephen Drew becomes the first player to hit for the cycle at Chase Field, helping Arizona rally past the Cardinals 8–6. Hours later in Texas, the Mariners' Adrián Beltré duplicates the feat in Seattle's 12–6 win over the Rangers. Both Drew and Beltré collect five hits in their respective efforts. This marks the first time two players hit for the cycle on the same day since September 17, 1920, when Bobby Veach of the Tigers and George Burns of the New York Giants did it, according to the Elias Sports Bureau.
- September 3 – In the Yankees' 8–4 win over the Rays, a home run hit by New York's Alex Rodriguez is the first ever to be reviewed by instant replay. Though the ball is initially ruled a home run, Tampa Bay manager Joe Maddon argues the ball was close enough to the left field foul pole to necessitate a review. After a conversation among the umpires, crew chief Charlie Reliford agrees to the review and eventually upholds the home run call.
- September 8:
  - Pinch-hitting for Houston, Mark Saccomanno homers on the first pitch he sees in the major leagues to help the Astros beat the visiting Pittsburgh Pirates, 3–2. Saccomanno becomes the 22nd player to hit a home run on his first pitch in the majors. The Cleveland Indians' Kevin Kouzmanoff was the last to do it before Saccomanno, according to the Elias Sports Bureau. Kouzmanoff hit a grand slam on the first pitch against the Texas Rangers on September 2, 2006, becoming the first major leaguer to hit a grand slam on his first pitch.
  - Gary Sheffield, four home runs short of the coveted 500 mark, provides another milestone for Major League Baseball. His second home run of the night is the 250,000th in major league history, and the Tigers beat the visiting Athletics 14–8. Sheffield collects five RBI, including his 13th career grand slam. Both homers come against Gio González; the rookie pitcher also puts himself in the history books when he hit Mike Hessman with pitches twice in the second inning. It is only the fifth time in modern baseball history that a batter is hit twice in the same inning, the second time in the American League. The first was Brady Anderson on May 23, 1999, when he was hit twice in the first inning by Mike Morgan.
  - Angels center fielder Torii Hunter gets caught in a rundown between third and home, and is tagged out relatively easily by Yankees catcher Iván "Pudge" Rodríguez. Hunter trips slightly over the bat at home plate, and bumps Pudge after the play. Rodriguez, in turn, shoves Hunter while walking toward the mound. That prompts Hunter to shove Rodríguez, resulting in a bench-clearing brawl. Both Hunter and Rodriguez are suspended two games by Major League Baseball, and neither appeals the suspension. Angels pitcher John Lackey receives an undisclosed fine by MLB for his involvement.
- September 10 – With a 4–2 win over the Yankees and an 8–7 loss by the second-place Rangers to the Mariners, the Los Angeles Angels of Anaheim clinch their seventh American League West division title, becoming the earliest team to clinch that division in its history.
- September 12 – Marlins third baseman Jorge Cantú launches his team into the record books at Dolphin Stadium, when he connects for his 25th home run of the season off pitcher Shairon Martis in a 2–1 Marlins victory over the Nationals. Cantú joins first baseman Mike Jacobs (32), second baseman Dan Uggla (30) and shortstop Hanley Ramírez (29) as the Marlins become the first team in major league history to boast four infielders with at least 25 homers apiece during a regular season.
- September 13:
  - Angels closer Francisco Rodríguez records his 58th save of the season, breaking the single-season record set by Bobby Thigpen in 1990.
  - At Fenway Park, Dustin Pedroia goes 3 for 5 with two doubles in the Red Sox' 7–5 victory over the Blue Jays in the second game of a doubleheader. Pedroia becomes the third player in Red Sox history to accumulate 200 hits and 50 doubles in a season. The others are Tris Speaker (1912) and Wade Boggs (1989). Pedroia also becomes the eighth player in team's history with 50 doubles in a season, giving him 69 extra-base hits this season, to move into a first-place tie with Bobby Doerr (1940) on Boston's all-time list for extra bases in a season by a second baseman.
  - Hanley Ramírez hits his 30th home run, which combine with his 33 stolen bases to make him the second player in Marlins history to have a 30–30 season. Ramírez and the Marlins roll to their fourth consecutive victory, a 4–2 win over the visiting Nationals. Preston Wilson is the first Marlin player to achieve the feat, with 31 homers and 36 steals in 2000.
  - As a consequence of Hurricane Ike striking the Houston area, two games of a series between the Astros and Cubs, originally scheduled to be played at Houston's Minute Maid Park, are relocated to Milwaukee's Miller Park, to be played September 14 and 15.
- September 14 – Carlos Zambrano of the Cubs pitches a 5–0 no-hitter against the Astros in a game relocated to Miller Park in Milwaukee. This is the first no-hitter in MLB history thrown at a neutral site, the second no-hitter of the 2008 season, the first of Zambrano's career, and the first for the Cubs since 1972. Zambrano was diagnosed with rotator cuff tendinitis on September 4.
- September 15:
  - The Minnesota Twins and Target Corporation announce that the naming rights to the Twins' new stadium set to open in 2010 are sold to the Minneapolis-based retail giant for undisclosed financial terms.
  - The Brewers, citing a late-season slump amid a postseason race, dismiss manager Ned Yost and name third base coach Dale Sveum as interim manager.
- September 17 – Ichiro Suzuki of the Mariners records his 200th hit of the season. This marks the eighth consecutive season he reaches the milestone, breaking the AL record previously held by Wade Boggs and tying the major league record set by "Wee" Willie Keeler from 1894–1901.
- September 18 - New York Yankees catcher Francisco Cervelli makes his major league debut as a defensive replacement
- September 19 – Rays first baseman Carlos Peña is awarded a home run after the original ruling of a ground-rule double due to fan interference is overturned by umpire Gerry Davis following an instant replay consultation during an 11–1 Rays victory over the Twins. This marks the first time in major league history that the instant replay rule is used to overturn a call.
- September 20:
  - The Chicago Cubs win their second straight National League Central division championship with a 5–4 victory over the arch-rival Cardinals.
  - The Tampa Bay Rays clinch their first postseason berth in franchise history with a 7–2 victory over the Twins.
- September 21 – The Yankees defeat the Orioles 7–3, in the final game played at Yankee Stadium. Andy Pettitte is the winning pitcher and teammate José Molina belts the last home run in the storied ballpark.
- September 23 – The Boston Red Sox' 5–4 victory over the Indians eliminates the Yankees from AL Wild Card contention and assures the Red Sox of a playoff berth. The Yankees' elimination ends a streak of 13 consecutive postseason appearances, the second longest such streak in MLB history.
- September 24 – The Los Angeles Dodgers clinch the National League West title when the second-place Diamondbacks are defeated by the Cardinals 12–3.
- September 25 – In the second inning of a 12–3 loss to the St. Louis Cardinals at Busch Stadium, Mark Reynolds of the Arizona Diamondbacks strikes out for the 200th time on the season, breaking the record of 199 set by Ryan Howard a year earlier. He ends the season with 204 strikeouts.
- September 26 – The Tampa Bay Rays clinch the American League East division title when the second-place Red Sox lose 19–8 to the Yankees. The Red Sox simultaneously clinch the Wild Card spot.
- September 27 – The Philadelphia Phillies clinch the National League East divisional title when they beat the Nationals 4–3. Brad Lidge earns his 41st save in 41 attempts.
- September 28
  - The Milwaukee Brewers win the National League wild card berth by defeating the Cubs 3–1 while the Mets simultaneously lose 4–2 to the Marlins. It is the first postseason appearance by the Brewers since 1982. The Mets, in their final game ever at Shea Stadium, are eliminated from the postseason on the final day of the regular season for the second straight year.
  - Mike Mussina of the Yankees wins his 20th game of the season. At 39, he is the oldest pitcher to get his first 20-win season.
  - The Los Angeles Angels of Anaheim finish with a 100–62 record, to finish the regular season with the majors' best record. The Angels also enter in the baseball record books as the only team since 1931 to win 100 games in a season without a 30-home run hitter, a 100-RBI producer, or a 20-game winning pitcher, according to the Elias Sports Bureau.
- September 29 – One day after the originally scheduled final day of the regular season, the White Sox, one-half game behind the Twins in the AL Central standings, are forced to make up a game with the Tigers that had previously been cancelled earlier in the season. The White Sox defeat the Tigers 8–2, forcing a one-game playoff with the Twins for the division title.
- September 30 – The Chicago White Sox defeat the Twins 1–0 in a one-game playoff for the AL Central division title. The White Sox and crosstown Cubs both reach the postseason in the same year for the first time since 1906.

=== October ===
- October 4 – The Los Angeles Dodgers complete a three-game sweep of the Chicago Cubs to advance to the NLCS. Because of that, the Cubs extend their World Series victory drought to 100 years, making it a first in American sports history.
- October 5
  - The Philadelphia Phillies defeat the Milwaukee Brewers to win their best-of-five NLDS 3–1.
  - Boston Red Sox CF Jacoby Ellsbury hits the first three-run single in major league postseason history off of P Joe Saunders of the Los Angeles Angels of Anaheim. The hit comes with two outs and the bases loaded in the bottom of the second inning of Game 3 of the 2008 American League Division Series (ALDS). Ellsbury hits a blooper on the shallow center field grass just behind second base that three Angels fielders let drop between them. Since the runners were moving with two outs, all three come in to score and Ellsbury stops at first base. Anaheim goes on to win the game, however, 5–4 in 12 innings. The win for the Angels snaps an 11-game postseason losing streak to Boston, a major league record.
- October 6
  - The Tampa Bay Rays advance to the ALCS for the first time in their 11-season history by downing the Chicago White Sox in Game 4.
  - The Red Sox defeat the Angels in Game 4 to clinch their fourth ALDS title in the last six seasons.
- October 8 – The Yomiuri Giants beat the Hanshin Tigers 3–1 in their last regular-season meeting. The Giants, which never led in the league in this season and once were 13 games behind the Tigers (on July 9), take the lead for the first time. The Giants win the league championship two days later after they win a game against the Tokyo Yakult Swallows while the Tigers lose to Yokohama BayStars. It is the greatest comeback victory since 1996.
- October 16
  - The Philadelphia Phillies win their sixth National League Championship and advance to the World Series with a 5–1 win over the Los Angeles Dodgers in the Game Five of the 2008 National League Championship Series.
  - Trailing 7–0 in the bottom of the seventh inning and facing a 3–1 series deficit, the Boston Red Sox come back to defeat the Tampa Bay Rays 8–7. It is the largest successful postseason comeback since Game 4 of the 1929 World Series, and the largest ever for a team facing elimination.
- October 19–– The Tampa Bay Rays advance to the World Series for the first time in their history, beating the Boston Red Sox 3–1 in Game Seven of the 2008 American League Championship Series.
- October 25 – Albert Pujols of the Cardinals is named the 2008 winner of the Roberto Clemente Award. He is also named Players Choice Player of the Year for the second time, having also won in 2003, the Player's Choice Award's NL Outstanding Player and The Sporting News Major League Player of the Year.
- October 26 – Pitcher Joe Blanton of the Phillies hits a home run in Game 4 of the World Series, becoming the first pitcher to hit a home run in the World Series since 1974.
- October 27 – Game 5 of the World Series in Philadelphia is suspended due to rain in the middle of the sixth inning with the Phillies and Rays tied 2–2 and the Phillies leading the series 3 games to 1. It is the first suspended game in World Series history.
- October 29 – Game 5 of the World Series is resumed at Citizens Bank Park in the bottom of the sixth inning after having been suspended October 27 because of rain. The Phillies win the game 4–3 to win their first title since 1980 and bring the city of Philadelphia a championship after 25 years. Pitcher Cole Hamels is named World Series MVP.

=== November ===
- November 9 – The Saitama Seibu Lions beat the Yomiuri Giants 3–2 in Game 7 in the Japan Series, winning the series 4–3.
- November 12:
  - Manager of the Year honors go to Joe Maddon of the Tampa Bay Rays and Lou Piniella of the Chicago Cubs. Maddon leads the American League team not just to the first winning record in franchise history, but also to the World Series. Piniella guides Chicago to the best record in the National League. It is Piniella's third time winning the honor, having been honored in 1995 and 2001 while in the American League.
  - The Oakland Athletics trade former closer Huston Street, starter Greg Smith and prospect Carlos González to the Colorado Rockies for former batting champion Matt Holliday.
- November 16
  - The Saitama Seibu Lions beat the Uni-President Lions 1–0 in the finals of the Asia Series, the fourth consecutive year Japan's side retains the title. This is also the last game of the brief history of the Asia Series, as the series is replaced by a single exhibition game between Japan and Korea's Champion in 2009 due to profit issues.
  - The Kobe 9 Cruise, a team from the Kansai Independent Baseball League launching in 2009, drafts 16-year-old knuckleballer Eri Yoshida with the 7th pick. She is the first ever female player playing at a professional level baseball league in Japan alongside male players; she officially signs with the team on December 2.
- November 17
  - Albert Pujols wins his second NL MVP Award for the Cardinals. He also won the award in 2005.
  - It is announced that baseball's legends and old-timers play in a new Hall of Fame Classic game beginning in 2009. The inaugural Hall of Fame Classic is held on Father's Day, June 21. The game replaces the Hall of Fame Game, which was discontinued this year after 68 years.
- November 18
  - Red Sox second baseman Dustin Pedroia wins the AL MVP Award, after establishing single-season franchise records by a second baseman for runs, hits, doubles, batting average, total bases, and extra-base hits. Pedroia also becomes just the eighth player in AL history to earn MVP, Gold Glove, and Silver Slugger awards in the same season.
  - The Mariners appoint Don Wakamatsu as their new manager for the 2009 season; he becomes the first Asian-American to manage a major league team.

=== December ===
- December 4 – Pitcher Junichi Tazawa becomes the first Japanese prospect to skip the Nippon Professional Baseball draft and sign directly with a Major League Baseball team. Tazawa signs a three-year, $3.3 million deal with the Boston Red Sox. A member of Japan's squad in the 2007 Baseball World Cup, he is projected to start 2009 at Double-A.
- December 10:
  - In a three-team, 12-player blockbuster trade, the New York Mets receive pitchers J. J. Putz and Sean Green and outfielder Jeremy Reed from the Seattle Mariners in exchange for OF Endy Chávez, Ps Aaron Heilman and Jason Vargas, three minor-leaguers, and Cleveland Indians OF Franklin Gutiérrez, while Mets P Joe Smith and Seattle infielder Luis Valbuena are sent to Cleveland. Hours before completing the trade, the Mets sign a $37 million, three-year contract with closer Francisco Rodríguez, who set a new major league record with 62 saves in the regular season.
  - The Detroit Tigers acquire pitcher Edwin Jackson from the Tampa Bay Rays in exchange for outfielder Matt Joyce.
- December 22 – A California appeals court rules against the city of Anaheim in its battle to restore the name Anaheim Angels to its major league baseball team. The 4th District Court of Appeal rules late Friday against the city, which claimed that team owner Arte Moreno violated the city-owned stadium lease agreement when he changed the name to the Los Angeles Angels of Anaheim.

== Media ==
- Sugar
- Touching Home

== Deaths ==
=== January ===
- January 1 – Chuck Daniel, 74, pitcher for the 1957 Detroit Tigers, and the only major leaguer to come out of the University of the Ozarks
- January 2 – Gerry Staley, 87, All-Star pitcher for six teams from 1947 to 1961 who won 19 games for the 1951 St. Louis Cardinals and led AL in games as a reliever for the 1959 Chicago White Sox
- January 2 – Richard J. Thompson, 52, baseball historian and author who was a SABR member for more than 25 years and authored the book The Ferrell Brothers of Baseball
- January 4 – Bill Ramsey, 87, outfielder for the 1945 Boston Braves
- January 7 – Buddy LeRoux, 77, general partner and co-owner of the Boston Red Sox from May 23, 1978, to March 30, 1987; began sporting career as an athletic trainer before becoming a successful businessman
- January 8 – Steve Ridzik, 78, relief pitcher who worked in 314 games for five teams, principally the expansion Washington Senators and Philadelphia Phillies, over a dozen seasons between 1950 and 1966
- January 13 – Johnny Podres, 75, All-Star pitcher for the Brooklyn Dodgers who was MVP of the 1955 World Series and also pitched for the Los Angeles Dodgers' 1959 and 1963 World Series champions; led NL in ERA, shutouts and winning percentage once each
- January 14 – Don Cardwell, 72, pitcher for five NL teams over 14 seasons (1957–1970) who threw a no-hitter in his first start with the Chicago Cubs, May 15, 1960; member of 1969 "Miracle" New York Mets
- January 17 – John McHale, 86, executive who served as general manager or club president of the Detroit Tigers, Milwaukee/Atlanta Braves and Montreal Expos between 1957 and 1986; previously a reserve first baseman on Detroit's 1945 World Series champions
- January 18 – Jean Weaver, 74, female pitcher for the AAGPBL Fort Wayne Daisies
- January 18 – Al Montreuil, 64, second baseman for the 1972 Chicago Cubs
- January 22 – Lance Clemons, 60, relief pitcher for the Kansas City Royals, St. Louis Cardinals and Boston Red Sox from 1971 to 1974
- January 24 – Art Frantz, 86, American League umpire from 1969 to 1977 who was crew chief for the 1975 World Series; also worked the 1972 and 1976 ALCS and 1974 All-Star Game
- January 27 – Ken Hunt, 69, pitcher for the Cincinnati Reds 1961 NL champions who won the TSN Rookie Pitcher Award in the same season—which was his only campaign in Major League Baseball

=== February ===
- February 2 – Ed Vargo, 79, National League umpire from 1960 to 1983 who officiated in the World Series, NLCS and All-Star Game four times each
- February 6 – Marjorie Pieper, 85, All-American Girls Professional Baseball League player from 1946 to 1953
- February 10 – Dario Lodigiani, 91, infielder for Philadelphia Athletics and Chicago White Sox who played in 405 games over six seasons between 1938 and 1946; later a coach and longtime scout; member of the Pacific Coast League Hall of Fame
- February 10 – Lenny Roberts, 85, National League umpire who worked in 72 games during the 1953 season, his only year in the majors
- February 14 – Hal Erickson, 88, star pitcher in the minors for the Quebec Braves in the late 1940s who later became a 33-year-old rookie with the 1953 Tigers
- February 19 – Bob Howsam, 89, general manager of the Cincinnati Reds from 1967 to 1977, and primary builder of the "Big Red Machine" dynasty that won four NL pennants and two World Series titles; previously general manager of the St. Louis Cardinals (1965–1966), owner of the Denver Bears minor league franchise, and one of the key founding owners of the ill-fated "third major league", the Continental League, in 1959; founder of the American Football League's Denver Broncos
- February 25 – Roy Wise, 84, pitcher for the Pittsburgh Pirates in 1944
- February 27 – Sheldon "Chief" Bender, 88, minor league player and manager who became a longtime scout and farm system director, notably for the Cincinnati Reds; spent 64 years in professional baseball

=== March ===
- March 2 – Barbara Anne Davis, 77, All-American Girls Professional Baseball League player
- March 6 – Deacon Donahue, 87, pitcher for the Philadelphia Phillies from 1943 to 1944
- March 8 – Ossie Álvarez, 74, Cuban infielder for the Washington Senators and Detroit Tigers from 1958 to 1959, who later became a minor league manager
- March 15 – Niles Jordan, 84, pitcher in 1951 and 1952 with the Philadelphia Phillies and Cincinnati Reds
- March 16 – Bob Purkey, 78, All-Star pitcher for the Cincinnati Reds, who was 23–5 in 1962 after losing 3–2 in Game 3 of the 1961 World Series
- March 21 – Roy Foster, 62, outfielder for the Cleveland Indians from 1970 to 1972, who won the 1970 TSN Rookie of the Year Award
- March 27 – Billy Consolo, 73, shortstop for five teams from 1953 to 1962, who later served as the Detroit Tigers dugout coach for 14 seasons

=== April ===
- April 4 – Jerry Crider, 66, pitcher for the 1969 Twins and the 1970 White Sox
- April 5 – Walt Masterson, 87, All-Star pitcher for the Senators and Red Sox from 1939 to 1953 who started the 1948 All-Star Game; baseball coach at George Mason University in 1980–1981
- April 8 – Hersh Lyons, 92, pitcher who appeared in one game for the 1941 Cardinals
- April 12 – Jim Goodwin, 81, pitcher for the 1948 Chicago White Sox
- April 14 – Tommy Holmes, 91, All-Star right fielder for the Boston Braves from 1942 to 1951 who hit .302 lifetime; his modern NL record 37-game hitting streak, set in 1945, lasted until broken by Pete Rose in 1978; managed Braves from June 20, 1951, to May 30, 1952; later a New York Mets executive
- April 19 – John Marzano, 45, backup catcher for the Red Sox and Mariners who played for division champions with both teams, batting .287 for the 1997 Mariners; member of the 1984 US Olympic team
- April 27 – Art Johnson, 88, pitcher for the Boston Bees/Braves from 1940 to 1942

=== May ===
- May 1 – Buzzie Bavasi, 93, general manager of the Brooklyn/Los Angeles Dodgers from 1951 to 1968 who assembled teams that won eight NL pennants and the club's first four World Series titles; later the first club president of the San Diego Padres (1968–1977), and GM of the California Angels (1977–1984) whose 1979 and 1982 teams won the club's first two division titles
- May 5 – Cal Howe, 83, pitcher who threw two hitless innings for the 1952 Chicago Cubs in his only MLB appearance
- May 12 – Janet Rumsey, 76, All-American Girls Professional Baseball League All-Star pitcher who hurled the last no-hitter in the league's history
- May 20 – Herb Hash, 97, pitcher for the Boston Red Sox in 1940 and 1941
- May 23 – Bob Ferguson, 89, pitcher who worked in nine games for wartime 1944 Cincinnati Reds
- May 25 – Geremi González, 33, Venezuelan pitcher for five teams between 1997 and 2006, who led the 1997 Cubs with 11 wins in his rookie season
- May 30 – Ray Hoffman, 90, third baseman for the 1942 Washington Senators

=== June ===
- June 10 – Eliot Asinof, 88, writer on baseball best known for his nonfiction book 8 Men Out about the 1919 Black Sox scandal
- June 12 – Charlie Jones, 77, legendary pro football play-by-play broadcaster who also described MLB games for the Cincinnati Reds (1973–1974), California Angels (1980) and Colorado Rockies (1993–1995)
- June 13 – Tim Russert, 58, broadcast journalist who was a member of the Baseball Hall of Fame's board of directors since 2003
- June 15 – John Buzhardt, 71, pitcher for five teams from 1958 to 1968 who earned 49 of his 71 victories with the White Sox
- June 16 – Bert Shepard, 87, left-handed pitcher who appeared in one game for the 1945 Senators despite having had his right leg amputated after his fighter plane was shot down during World War II; coached for 1946 Senators
- June 27 – Alex Garbowski, 86, pinch runner in two early-season games for the 1952 Detroit Tigers; a shortstop in the minor leagues
- June 28 – Sam Carrigan, 86, American League umpire who officiated in 627 games from April 11, 1961, to October 4, 1964

=== July ===
- July 3 – Annabelle Lee, 86, pitcher who hurled the first perfect game in All-American Girls Professional Baseball League history
- July 9 – Don Eaddy, 74, pinch running specialist for 1959 Chicago Cubs; appeared in 15 games, 14 as a pinch runner, scoring three runs; batted only once and played four innings at second base
- July 9 – Elizabeth Fabac, 86, who played excellent defense at second base and twice led the AAGPBL in fielding average at her position
- July 10 – Steve Mingori, 64, relief pitcher for the Indians and Royals from 1970 to 1979 who saved Game 4 of the 1976 ALCS
- July 11 – Chuck Stobbs, 79, pitcher who played for the Red Sox, White Sox, Senators, Twins and Cardinals from 1947 to 1960
- July 12 – Bobby Murcer, 62, five-time All-Star outfielder, best known for his years with the Yankees, who led the AL in runs, total bases and on-base percentage once each; later a popular broadcaster with the Yankees
- July 13 – Dave Ricketts, 73, catcher and longtime coach for the Cardinals who played on their 1967 World Series champions and was a coach on the 1982 World Series winners
- July 14 – Red Foley, 79, sportswriter for the New York Daily News for 34 years who was also an official scorer in 10 World Series, more than any other scorer in modern history
- July 19 – Jerome Holtzman, 82, sportswriter for Chicago newspapers from 1957 to 1999 who went on to serve as Major League Baseball's official historian until his death; instigator of the save statistic in the late 1950s, he was honored with the Hall of Fame's Spink Award in 1990
- July 27 – Russ Gibson, 69, catcher for the Red Sox and Giants who was a reserve on Boston's 1967 pennant winners
- July 29 – Earlene Risinger, 81, All-Star pitcher in the All-American Girls Professional Baseball League
- July 30 – Porter Vaughan, 89, left-handed pitcher who dropped 11 of his 13 MLB decisions in his 24-game career with the Philadelphia Athletics (1940-–1941 and 1946)

=== August ===
- August 3 – Skip Caray, 68, broadcaster for the Atlanta Braves from 1976 to 2007; member of three-generation MLB announcer family, between legendary father Harry and son Chip.
- August 6 – Karl Kuehl, 70, manager of the Montreal Expos for most of the 1976 season; coach for the Minnesota Twins from 1977 to 1982; also a scout and player development executive; former minor league first baseman and manager
- August 12 – George Gick, 92, relief pitcher in two games for the White Sox in 1937 and 1938
- August 12 – Dottie Wiltse Collins, 84, female pitcher for the Fort Wayne Daisies from 1944 to 1950 who led the AAGPBL in strikeouts in 1945
- August 15 – Darrin Winston, 42, relief pitcher for the Philadelphia Phillies from 1997 to 1998

=== September ===
- September 2 – Todd Cruz, 52, infielder for six different major league teams from 1978 to 1984 and a member of the 1983 World Champion Baltimore Orioles
- September 7 – Don Gutteridge, 96, infielder for four major league teams, mainly the Cardinals and Browns, who coached for the White Sox from 1955 to 1966 and managed the team in 1969–1970; was the last living Browns player from the 1944 pennant winners, and the oldest living major league manager
- September 24 – Mickey Vernon, 90, seven-time All-Star first baseman and two-time AL batting champion with the 1901–1960 Washington Senators who set several fielding records during a four-decade, 20-year (1939–1943; 1946–1960) career with five MLB teams; first manager of the "expansion" Senators (now the Texas Rangers) from 1961 to May 1963
- September 28 – Dorothy Naum, 80, catcher and pitcher who played from 1946 through 1953 in the All-American Girls Professional Baseball League
- September 30 – Ed Brinkman, 66, All-Star shortstop, primarily with the Washington Senators (1961–1970), who held record of 72 straight errorless games by a shortstop for 18 seasons; won the 1972 Gold Glove with the Tigers

=== October ===
- October 7 – Bruce Dal Canton, 67, relief pitcher for the Pirates, Royals, Braves and White Sox (1967–1977) who later worked for the Braves as their pitching coach (1987–1990) and as an instructor in the Atlanta farm system (1991–2008)
- October 7 – George Kissell, 88, who had been with the St. Louis Cardinals since 1940 as a minor-league player, instructor and manager, major league coach from 1969 to 1975, scout, and player development executive
- October 8 – Les McCrabb, 93, pitcher for the Philadelphia Athletics (1939–1942, 1950) who continued coaching for the team until 1954
- October 10 – Sid Hudson, 93, All-Star pitcher for the Washington Senators and Boston Red Sox from 1940 to 1954; later pitching coach of the Senators and Texas Rangers, and a scout for the Rangers and Red Sox
- October 11 – Kevin Foster, 39, hard thrower and good-control pitcher who played from 1993 through 2001 for the Phillies, Cubs and Rangers
- October 15 – Tom Tresh, 71, outfielder for the New York Yankees from 1961 to 1969, and hometown Detroit Tigers in 1970, who won AL Rookie of the Year Award in 1962 and Gold Glove in 1965
- October 19 – Lou Stringer, 91, second baseman who played 409 games over six seasons for the Chicago Cubs and Boston Red Sox between 1941 and 1950
- October 25 – Rafael Batista, 61, Dominican first baseman for the Astros and Japan's Lotte Orions
- October 27 – Ed Levy, 91, left fielder/first baseman who appeared in 54 career games for the 1940 Philadelphia Athletics and 1942 and 1944 New York Yankees
- October 28 – Jake Crawford, 80, outfielder for the 1952 St. Louis Browns

=== November ===
- November 8 – Mary Lou Beschorner, 79, All-American Girls Professional Baseball League outfielder
- November 9 – Preacher Roe, 93, All-Star pitcher for the Brooklyn Dodgers in the late 1940s and early 1950s who posted a 22–3 record for a .880 winning percentage in 1951, setting a Dodgers record that still stands for the highest WP for a 20-game winner
- November 11 – Herb Score, 75, All-Star pitcher for the Cleveland Indians in 1955–1956 who won the 1955 Rookie of the Year Award after striking out 245 batters to set a rookie record (broken by Dwight Gooden in 1984); struck in the face—and nearly blinded—by a line drive off the bat of Gil McDougald of the New York Yankees on May 7, 1957; attempted a comeback in 1958 but never regained pre-injury form, pitching for the Indians and Chicago White Sox into 1962; later went on to a career in broadcasting with the Indians
- November 17 – Floyd Weaver, 67, pitcher for the Indians, White Sox and Brewers from 1962 to 1971, who struck out 21 batters in a nine-inning game at Grand Junction, Colorado, still a collegiate record
- November 23 – Fred McAlister, 80, scouting director for the St. Louis Cardinals organization, 1980–1993
- November 24 – Charlotte Armstrong, 84, pitcher and one of the All-American Girls Professional Baseball League founding members
- November 24 – Tom Burgess, 81, Canadian first baseman for the St. Louis Cardinals (1954) and Los Angeles Angels (1962), who later managed in the minors and coached for the New York Mets (1977) and Atlanta Braves (1978)
- November 25 – Bob DeLaney, 84, play-by-play broadcaster for the Boston Red Sox (1951–1954) and New York Giants (1955–1957), supporting #1 announcers Curt Gowdy and Russ Hodges
- November 25 – Randy Gumpert, 90, All-Star pitcher for the Philadelphia Athletics, New York Yankees, Chicago White Sox, Boston Red Sox and Washington Senators from 1936 to 1952; gave up Mickey Mantle's first home run in 1951
- November 27 – Frances Janssen, 82, All-American Girls Professional Baseball League pitcher for seven teams from 1948 to 1952
- November 27 – Andy Tomasic, 90, pitcher for the 1949 New York Giants
- November 28 – Red Murff, 87, relief pitcher for the Milwaukee Braves from 1956 to 1957, who later, as a scout for the New York Mets, discovered future Hall of Fame pitcher Nolan Ryan

=== December ===
- December 1 – Beverly Dustrude, 82, who played second base in the All-American Girls Professional Baseball League
- December 2 – Ted Rogers, 75, owner of the Toronto Blue Jays, and founder of Rogers Communications Inc., Canada's largest cable television and mobile phone company
- December 10 – Sal Yvars, 84, catcher for the New York Giants and St. Louis Cardinals from 1947 to 1954, well known for his outstanding defensive skills
- December 14 – Nick Willhite, 67, pitcher who posted a 6–12 record with a 4.55 ERA in 58 games for four teams from 1963 to 1967, and a member of the 1963 and 1965 Dodgers World championship teams
- December 17 – Dave Smith, 53, All-Star closer whose 563 outings with the Houston Astros is tops on the club's list, and his 199 saves ranks him second
- December 19 – Dock Ellis, 63, All-Star pitcher who posted 138–119 with a 3.46 ERA from 1968 to 1979, spending most of his career with the Pittsburgh Pirates, including a no-hitter against the San Diego Padres in 1970

== See also ==
- 2008 Major League Baseball season
- 2008 Nippon Professional Baseball season
- 2008 Korea Baseball Organization season
