= Korrigan (disambiguation) =

Korrigan may refer to:

- Korrigan, a fairy or dwarf-like spirit in Breton folkloric heritage
- Malo Korrigan, full English title Malo Korrigan and the Space Tracers, French title Malo Korrigan et les Traceurs de L'Espace, French animated television series

== See also ==
- Corrigan (disambiguation)
- Corrigan (surname)
- Currigan
