= Carrigan (surname) =

Carrigan is a surname. Notable people with the surname include:

- Anthony Carrigan (academic) (1980–2016), British academic
- Anthony Carrigan (actor) (born 1983), American actor
- Aub Carrigan (1917–2012), Australian first-class cricketer
- Benjamin Carrigan (born 1998), Australian professional footballer
- Bill Carrigan (1883–1969), American baseball catcher
- Bob Carrigan (born 1966), American businessman
- Brian Carrigan (born 1979), Scottish footballer
- Bryan Carrigan (born 1969), American music producer, engineer, and electronic musician
- Casey Carrigan (born 1951), American track and field athlete
- Charles Carrigan (1882–1916), Irish republican
- Gene Carrigan (1906–1945), Canadian ice hockey player
- James J. Carrigan (born 1941), American attorney and politician
- Jerry Carrigan (1943–2019), American drummer and record producer
- Jim Carrigan (judge) (1929–2014), American jurist
- John E. Carrigan (1910–1984), American jurist and politician
- Kim Carrigan (born 1958), Australian rockclimber
- Pat Carrigan (1898–1957), Scottish footballer
- Patrick Carrigan (born 1998), Australian professional rugby league footballer
- Sam Carrigan (1921–2008), American professional baseball umpire
- Sara Carrigan (born 1980), Australian cyclist
- Sean Carrigan (born 1974), American actor, producer, and stand-up comedian
- Thomas Carrigan (1886–1941), American actor
- William Carrigan (1860–1924), Irish Roman Catholic priest and historian

== See also ==
- Carrigan, town in Ireland
- Carrigan Township, Marion County, Illinois
- Carrigan, New South Wales
- Carrigan Lane Historic District
- Carrigan v Redwood, 1910 New Zealand lawsuit
- Nevada Commission on Ethics v. Carrigan, 2011 Nevada lawsuit
- Carrigans (disambiguation)
