= Demographics of Denver =

According to the 2010 Census, the racial makeup of Denver is 68.9% White, 10.2% Black or African American, 3.4% Asian, 1.4% American Indian or Native Alaskan, 0.1% Pacific Islander or Native Hawaiian, and 4.1% two or more races, with 31.8% of Hispanic or Latino origin.

== European American Denver ==
As of the 2010-2014 American Community Survey, 77.5% of Denver's population reported white ancestry. Non-Hispanic whites made up 52.9% of the city's population according to the survey, up from 51.9% of Denver's population in the 2000 Census.

Major ethnic groups of European ancestry in Denver include: Germans (14.7%), British (11.3%), Irish (9.9%), Italian (3.9%), French (2.8%), and Polish (2.1%). Of the 105,000 foreign-born in Denver, 8.3% were born in Europe.

There is a Greek community in Denver. There is also an Italian community in Denver.

== Hispanic and Latino Denver ==
According to the 2010 Census, approximately one-third of Denver's population consists of Hispanic or Latino people. 31.8% of the population is Hispanic or Latino of any race.

In the state of Colorado, 21% of the state population is Latino, over 1 million in Colorado.

607,694 Hispanics in the seven-county metro area, making up 22% of the total population.

In Colorado, Latinos' purchasing power totaled $21.9 billion, an increase of 456.8% since 1990.

13.4% of Latinos eligible to vote but not registered in the state of Colorado.

219,233 Hispanic registered voters in Colorado.

In 1983, Denver voters elected its first Hispanic mayor, Federico Peña, who served in that office until 1991.

Mexicans live in Denver’s Northside.

== First Nations people in Denver ==
The City of Denver has established the Denver American Indian Commission to promote better relations between First Nations people and the wider community. The annual Denver Pow-Wow in March is one of the largest in the country and hosts traditional First Nations dances, attracting First Nations People from across the US and Canada, as well as many non-First Nations people.

== The Black American West and Denver ==
Many of the early inhabitants to settle the city were of African lineage, especially those who had escaped slavery. African-American mountain man Jim Beckwourth homesteaded land in what is now Denver in 1863. In honor of these frontiersmen, Paul Stewert created the Black American West Museum in Denver.

The Five Points neighborhood is historically associated with African-American culture in Denver. In the 1940s through the 1950s, jazz clubs in Five Points provided popular venues for famous African American musicians.

Denver's first African-American mayor, Wellington Webb, served in that office from 1991 to 2003. The Denver mayor from 2011 to 2023 was Michael Hancock, elected in 2011 and re-elected in 2015 and 2019, is also African-American, as are former city councilwoman Allegra "Happy" Haynes and Denver police chief Robert C. White. Former Denver First Lady and State Senator Wilma Webb led the successful movement to adopt Martin Luther King, Jr. Day as a state holiday, long before it became a federal holiday.

== Asian-American Denver ==
Chinese people first arrived in Denver in 1870, and settled in a neighborhood known as "Hop Alley" along Wazee Street ("Wazee" is said to be a Chinese name). Denver was the scene of a deadly anti-Chinese riot in 1880.

Denver has an active population of Japanese Americans. Sakura Square in downtown Denver was founded in 1944 by formerly-interned Japanese Americans migrating from the West Coast states of Washington, Oregon, and California. The community hosts several public markets and restaurants.

The former Lowry Air Force Base is where many Southeast Asian immigrants first came into Denver.

== Jewish Denver ==
In the city of Denver, the largest populations of Jews are found in the West Colfax and Hilltop neighborhoods. The heritage of many generations of Jewish Denverites is very visible in the city, and its many landmarks (several prominent synagogues among them). Denver is also home to the National Jewish Medical and Research Center. Famous Jews from or who lived in Denver include Golda Meir. The weekly news paper Intermountain Jewish News is published from Denver.

== Other ethnicities ==
Denver is home to many other ethnicities. There are also sizable immigrant Polish, Ethiopian, Senegalese, Eritrean, and Lebanese populations in Denver.

== Ancestries ==
Ancestry by origin	Number as of 2022	%
American	23,866	3.3
Arab	5,652	0.8
Czech	4,744	0.7
Danish	3,021	0.4
Dutch	6,183	0.9
English	71,983	10.1
French (except Basque)	15,841	2.2
French Canadian	2,100	0.3
German	103,345	14.5
Greek	2,588	0.4
Hungarian	2,016	0.3
Irish	83,319	11.7
Italian	39,687	5.6
Lithuanian	1,898	0.3
Norwegian	14,202	2.0
Polish	18,120	2.5
Portuguese	2,688	0.4
Russian	7,229	1.0
Scotch-Irish	5,323	0.7
Scottish	15,643	2.2
Slovak	885	0.1
Subsaharan African	20,126	2.8
Swedish	14,335	2.0
Swiss	1,787	0.3
Ukrainian	3,731	0.5
Welsh	5,653	0.8
West Indian (excluding Hispanic origin groups)	1,296	0.2

== Languages ==
The top non-English languages spoken in Denver are Spanish, Vietnamese, Arabic, Somali and Amharic.

== Longevity ==
According to a report in the Journal of the American Medical Association, residents of Denver had a 2014 life expectancy of 80.02 years.

== See also ==
- List of people from Denver
