= Currigan =

Currigan is a surname shared by several notable people:

- Martin D. Currigan (1845–1900), Irish-American building contractor and politician
- Tom Currigan (1920–2014), American politician, Mayor of Denver; grandson of Martin D.

== See also ==
- Corrigan (disambiguation)
- Corrigan (surname)
- Korrigan (disambiguation)
