= Jack Corrigan =

Jack Corrigan may refer to:

- Jack Corrigan (lawyer) (born 1956), American Democratic Party operative
- Jack Corrigan (sportscaster), radio announcer for the Colorado Rockies in Major League Baseball
