= Corrigan =

Corrigan may refer to:

- Corrigan (surname), a surname of Irish origin
- Corrigan, Texas, a town in Polk County, Texas, United States
  - Corrigan-Camden High School
- Corrigan House, a home in Sarasota, Florida which is listed on the United States National Register of Historic Places
- Corrigan, a fictional town from Jasper Jones by Craig Silvey

== See also ==
- Currigan
- Korrigan
- Justice Corrigan (disambiguation)
