= Martin D. Currigan =

American politician

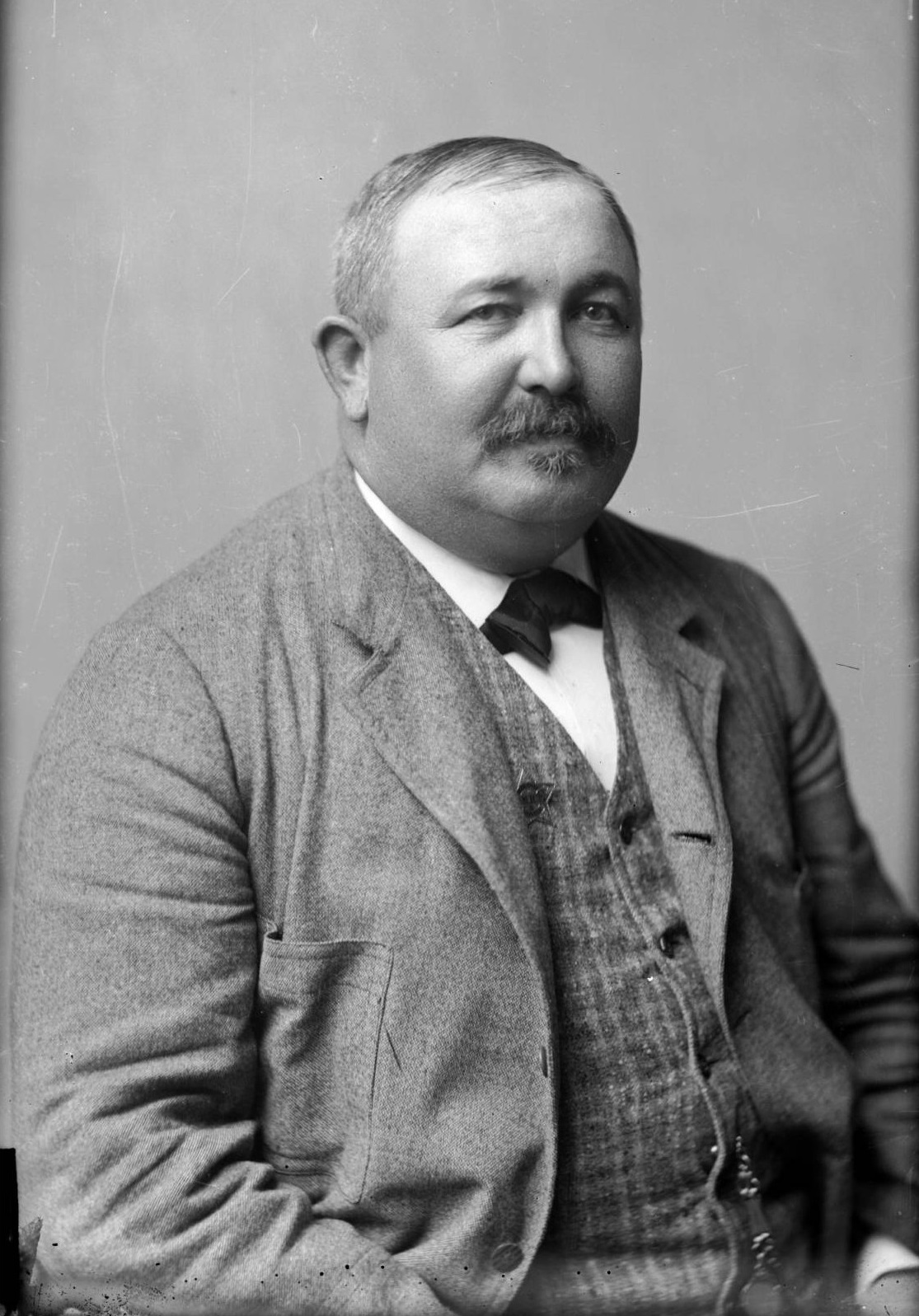
- Born: c. 1845; Ballaghaderreen, Ireland
- Died: Dec. 1900; Denver, CO
- Resting place: Mount Olivet Cemetery (Wheat Ridge), Jefferson County, Colorado
- Occupations: Building contractor, Alderman, City Councilman
- Children: Martin D. Currigan Jr.

Martin D. Currigan Sr. (c. 1845–1900) was a building contractor and city councilman in Denver, Colorado.

Currigan was born in about 1845 in Ireland in Ballaghaderreen in County Roscommon. He arrived in America in 1864, went west to Colorado, worked as a plastering contractor and entered politics in the 1870s. He was active in the Catholic Church. Currigan died in December 1900 after an injury sustained falling from his buggy on election day.

The Currigan Exhibition Hall in Denver, Colorado was named after him. The Currigan Exhibition Hall was unique in that it was built without internal structural columns, providing over 100,000 sqft of column-free exhibition space.

His son, Dr. Martin D. Currigan Jr., was on the Board of Regents of the University of Colorado. One of his grandsons, Tom Currigan, was Denver Auditor from 1955 to 1963 and the Mayor of Denver from 1963 to 1968. His nephew, James M. Currigan, was a settler, and mayor, of Oswego, Kansas.

== See also ==
- Corrigan (surname)
