= Ellen Hart Peña =

American lawyer and athlete (born 1958)

First Lady of Denver
- In office 1988 – July 15, 1991
- Succeeded by: Wilma Webb

Personal details
- Born: May 19, 1958 (age 68)
- Spouse(s): Federico Peña (m. 1988; div. 2001), Rob Woodruff (m. 2010)
- Children: 3
- Education: Harvard University (BA); University of Colorado Law School (JD)

Ellen Hart Peña (born May 19, 1958) is an American lawyer, former elite runner, and championship masters triathlete. She rose to prominence as a distance runner in the 1980s – qualifying for the U.S. Olympic team in track (10,000m event), setting national records, and winning major road races – before later achieving international success in triathlon as a masters competitor. Hart has also had a career as an attorney and has been active in public service and advocacy, notably in promoting fitness and eating disorder awareness.

== Early life, family and education ==
Hart was born in 1958 in New York City and was raised in Albuquerque, New Mexico, the second of eight children. She attended the Albuquerque Academy, where she excelled in multiple sports and graduated second in her class.

Hart attended college at Harvard University, initially playing varsity basketball and soccer. She was co-captain of Harvard's Ivy League champion women's soccer team. However, she changed her focus to running in her junior and senior years. She ran her first marathon in 1979 and in 1980 became the first Harvard woman to score at the NCAA track championships, placing fifth in the 10,000 meters. She earned her Bachelor's degree from Harvard in 1980 and later received a Juris Doctor from the University of Colorado Law School.

== Athletic career ==
=== Running ===
By 1980, Hart had emerged as one of the top female long-distance runners in the United States. At age 22, she placed third in the 10,000-meter run at the 1980 U.S. Olympic Trials, thereby qualifying for the U.S. Olympic team – although she was ultimately unable to compete at the Moscow Olympics due to the American boycott of those games.

Hart continued to compete at an elite level through the early 1980s. She won Colorado's prestigious Bolder Boulder 10K road race twice, in 1981 (time of 34:54) and 1983 (34:46). In 1984, she took part in the inaugural U.S. Women's Olympic Marathon Trials in Olympia, Washington, where she finished 11th with a time of 2:35:04. During this period, Hart set a world-best time for the 20K road distance (Nagoya, Japan) and established an American record for 30K. These accomplishments, along with her transition to professional running in 1982, cemented Hart's status as a world-class distance runner.

=== Triathlon and masters athletics ===
After a hiatus from elite competition, Hart reinvented herself as a champion masters athlete in multi-sport events. Hart entered her first triathlons in 2007 and quickly found success; by 2008 she had qualified for the Ironman World Championship in Kona, Hawaii. In 2008, at age 50, Hart won her first age group world title in the half Ironman distance (70.3), and in 2010, she won her first world title at the Ironman World Championship in Kona. These victories marked the start of a remarkable second career in endurance sports. Over the next decade, Hart amassed a total of 18 world championship titles in various age-group divisions across triathlon, duathlon, and aquathlon events. Her wins include three Ironman World Championship titles in Kona (2010, 2014, and 2015) and six consecutive age-group victories at the Ironman 70.3 (Half Ironman) World Championships from 2008 through 2013.

One of Hart's most extraordinary achievements came in late 2015, when at 57 years old she won five age-group world championships within roughly a six-week span. This streak, considered historic in triathlon circles, included titles at the Ironman 70.3 World Championship in Austria, the ITU Sprint and Olympic-Distance Triathlon World Championships in Chicago, the Ironman World Championship in Hawaii, and the ITU Duathlon World Championship in Australia. According to USA Triathlon officials, no other athlete had ever accomplished a similar feat, underscoring Hart's longevity and competitive drive. In recognition of her dominance, Hart was named the USA Triathlon Female Master of the Year in 2010, and in 2015 she earned the honor of USA Triathlon Grand Masters Athlete of the Year. Even as she entered her 60s, Hart continued to compete at a high level—qualifying for Kona eleven years in a row and frequently reaching the podium—and she has expressed gratitude for being able to "run from a place of joy and gratitude" later in life. In 2025, Hart's accomplishments in endurance sports were recognized with her induction into the USA Triathlon Hall of Fame.

== Legal and professional career ==
Parallel to her athletic pursuits, Ellen Hart built a career in law and public service. After graduating from law school, she joined a prominent Denver law firm in the late 1980s. She practiced as an attorney with the firm Morrison & Foerster from 1988 to 1990, specializing in corporate and regulatory law. Hart then pivoted to an academic service role, serving from 1990 to 1992 as the executive director of the Community Action Program at the University of Denver, a service-learning initiative that connected students with community volunteer projects.

During the 1990s, Hart also became involved in national fitness and sports organizations. She was appointed to the President's Council on Physical Fitness and Sports during the Bill Clinton administration, advising on policies to encourage healthy lifestyles and exercise. In addition, she served as a member of the United States Olympic Committee, contributing to Olympic sports administration and athlete support programs. Later in her career, Hart worked as a nutrition and wellness educator and devoted time to raising her three children, balancing professional duties with family life.

== Advocacy and public service ==
Hart's personal experiences informed much of her advocacy work. During her competitive running years in the 1980s, she struggled with severe eating disorders – anorexia nervosa and bulimia – brought on in part by pressure to lose weight for performance. She ultimately overcame a decade-long battle with these disorders by the early 1990s, an ordeal that was later depicted in a made-for-television film, Dying to Be Perfect: The Ellen Hart Peña Story, which aired in 1996. Since going public with her story, Hart has been a vocal advocate for eating disorder awareness and recovery. She co-founded the Eating Disorder Foundation in Denver, a nonprofit organization providing education and support for those affected by eating disorders. Hart frequently spoke to audiences about her experiences and has said that inspiring even one person's recovery means as much to her as winning a race.

In addition to health-related advocacy, Hart is involved in child welfare and community service. In 2018, she became a Court Appointed Special Advocate (CASA) in Boulder County, Colorado, working with children who have experienced abuse or neglect. In this role, she works directly with vulnerable children and families, helps monitor their well-being, and provides recommendations to courts regarding the children's best interests. Hart has described her CASA work as deeply rewarding and "capturing her heart" in a way unlike anything else in her life.

Ellen Hart Peña has used various channels from promoting youth fitness at the national level, to supporting at-risk children, and speaking out on eating disorders. Hart has used much of her post-athletic career to public service and advocacy.

== Personal life ==
In 1988, Ellen Hart married Federico Peña, a Denver politician who at that time was the city's mayor and later served as United States Secretary of Transportation and Energy in the 1990s under Bill Clinton. As the mayor's wife, she held the informal title of First Lady of Denver from 1988 until 1991, engaging in civic and charitable activities in the city. The couple had three children together: daughters Nelia and Cristina, and a son, Ryan. Their marriage ended in 2001.

Hart continued to reside in Colorado and raised her children while pursuing her career and athletic goals. In 2010, she remarried to Rob Woodruff, who had been instrumental in encouraging her entry into triathlons a few years prior. She is also a grandmother, an experience she credits with giving her new perspective beyond competition.

== Honors and recognitions ==
Hart's contributions to athletics and the community have earned her numerous honors. In 2008, she was inducted into the Colorado Running Hall of Fame, recognizing her achievements as one of the state's all-time great runners. She has also been honored by USA Triathlon multiple times: she received national age-group athlete of the year awards in 2010 and 2015 for her masters triathlon performances, and in 2023 she was announced as part of the USA Triathlon Hall of Fame's Class of 2025. In 2021, she was inducted into Albuquerque Academy's first hall of fame class for athletics.

In addition, Hart's story of resilience has been featured in national media, including profiles by ESPN and others, highlighting her as an inspirational figure in both the sports world and in advocacy for health and wellness. Her athletic feats – especially the 2015 string of five world titles – have been cited as historic for masters triathletes, and Tim Yount of USA Triathlon lauded her career as "a master class in consistency, resilience, and love for the sport". Through these accolades, Ellen Hart Peña's legacy is recognized as that of a trailblazing athlete and a dedicated community leader.

A made-for-TV movie was produced about her life and her history of eating disorders: Dying to Be Perfect: The Ellen Hart Pena Story (1996).
