= William H. McNichols Jr. =

American politician (1910–1997)

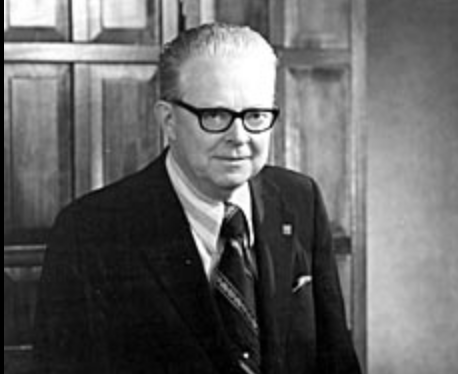

40th Mayor of Denver
- In office December 31, 1968 – July 2, 1983
- Preceded by: Tom Currigan
- Succeeded by: Federico Peña

36th President of the United States Conference of Mayors
- In office 1978–1979
- Preceded by: Lee Alexander
- Succeeded by: Richard Carver

Personal details
- Born: William Henry McNichols Jr. April 11, 1910 Denver, Colorado, U.S.
- Died: May 29, 1997 (aged 87) Colorado, U.S.
- Resting place: Mount Olivet Cemetery; Wheat Ridge, Colorado
- Party: Independent

Military service
- Allegiance: United States
- Branch/service: United States Army
- Battles/wars: World War II
- Awards: Purple Heart

William Henry McNichols Jr. (April 11, 1910 – May 29, 1997) was an American politician who served as the mayor of Denver, Colorado from 1968 to 1983.

== Biography ==
Born in Denver, McNichols was the son of Cassie and William H. McNichols Sr. His father served as Denver's City Auditor from 1931 until 1955. His younger brother, Stephen, served as Governor of Colorado from 1957 to 1963. After he graduated from Denver's East High School, he attended the University of Colorado-Boulder and then the University of Alabama, though he did not receive a degree from either institution.

During World War II, McNichols at age 33, enlisted in the Army and served in the 4th Armored Division (United States) engaged in the Siege of Bastogne. On April 4, 1945, the 4th armored Division liberated Ohrdruf concentration camp, the first Nazi camp liberated by U.S. troops. McNichols received three battle stars and the Purple Heart.

== Political career ==
Appointed by Mayor Tom Currigan in 1963 as deputy mayor and manager of public works, Bill McNichols became mayor in December 1968 following Currigan's resignation to fill an executive position with Continental Airlines. Campaigning in the city elections of 1971, 1975, and 1979, McNichols won a return to city hall. Running for reelection in May 1983, he finished third in votes behind Federico Peña and Dale Tooley. A significant factor in McNichols's failure to get re-elected was a two-day blizzard that began on December 24, 1982, and continued through the holiday. The massive storm dropped some two feet of snow, with more in some neighborhood; strong winds created impassible drifts. The city was virtually paralyzed as city crews failed to clear the streets for days.

During his fourteen years in office, several construction projects changed the landscape of the city, including:

- 16th Street Mall
- McNichols Sports Arena
- Denver Center for the Performing Arts
- Auraria Campus
- The North Building addition to the Denver Art Museum
- Expansions of Mile High Stadium
- Twenty new pools and recreational center

From 1978–1979, McNichols served as president of the United States Conference of Mayors.

In 1985, McNichols received the Citizen of the West Award, given by the National Western Stock Show to those who personify the spirit and determination of the Western pioneer.

McNichols died at his home on May 29, 1997. He is buried in Mount Olivet Cemetery in Wheat Ridge, Colorado.

In 1999, the city's old Carnegie library building in Civic Center Park was renamed the McNichols Civic Center Building in honor of the McNichols family. Previously used as offices for the city administration, the Greek-revival style structure underwent restoration from 2011 to 2012 and now serves as a cultural center for public exhibitions and community events.

Political offices
Preceded by Thomas G. Currigan	Mayor of Denver; 1968–1983	Succeeded by Federico Peña
