= Allegra "Happy" Haynes =

Allegra "Happy" Haynes (born March 4, 1953) is a Denver politician and consultant who formerly served on the Denver City Council and was an aide to two mayors.

== Early life and education ==
"Happy" Haynes was born in Denver, Colorado and graduated from Denver's East High School in 1971. Haynes received a B.A. in political science at Barnard College in 1975 and a M.A. in public affairs at the University of Colorado Denver in 2002. In addition, Haynes is a graduate of Leadership Denver, the Denver Community Leadership Forum, the Rocky Mountain Program and the State and Local Program at Harvard Kennedy School.

== Career ==
Haynes's 26-year-long connection to the City of Denver began in 1979, with her work as an aide to former Councilman Bill Roberts. From 1983 to 1990, Haynes was an administrative aide to Denver's first Latino Mayor, Federico Peña.

She won election to Denver City Council in 1990, becoming the first African American woman to serve on that panel. Happy Haynes served three terms and was Council President from 1998 to 2000. During her time as a Council member, Haynes fostered city policies that focused on families, children, and educational reform. From 2003 until 2005, Haynes served as Denver Mayor John Hickenlooper's liaison to the City Council and was involved with the development of Denver International Airport.

== Denver Public Schools ==
In October 2005, Haynes joined Denver Public Schools as the Assistant to the Superintendent for Community Partnerships and worked alongside then Superintendent Michael Bennet to direct and "oversee the district's initiatives on parent involvement, school partnerships, school culture and climate, mentoring and volunteer programs. In 2008, Governor Bill Ritter appointed Haynes to the Colorado Commission on Higher Education. Also working closely with the National Association for Urban Debate, Happy Haynes was personally involved in the efforts to increase student participation in debate. In 2009, Haynes recruited six high schools and awarded the students at the first tournament. Haynes became the Chief Community Engagement Officer for Denver Public Schools in 2009, assigned to "strengthen relationships with community organizations and business partners."

In 2011, she left the school district and accepted a position with CRL Associates, a political and public administration consultancy. When she resigned her school district position, she said she would be a candidate for the city school board.

She was elected to the Denver Public School's Board of Education in November 2011, serving until 2019. She served as President of the board from 2013 to 2015. In 2015 she was also appointed to serve as the executive director of Denver's Department of Parks and Recreation. She was serving as the board's secretary in 2017 when appointed as Mayor Michael B. Hancock's deputy mayor.

== Denver Parks and Rec ==
In September 2015, Haynes was elected to the position of executive director of the Denver Parks and Recreation.
