= Richard Batterton =

American politician (1905–1978)

38th Mayor of Denver
- In office 1959–1963
- Preceded by: Will Nicholson
- Succeeded by: Tom Currigan

Personal details
- Born: November 5, 1905 Petersburg, Illinois, U.S.
- Died: July 1978 (aged 72) Denver, Colorado, U.S.
- Party: Republican

Richard Yates Batterton (November 5, 1905 – July 1978) was an American politician who served as the mayor of Denver, Colorado from 1959 to 1963. As of 2025 he is the most recent Republican to serve as mayor of Denver.
