= Lisa M. Corrigan =

American academic

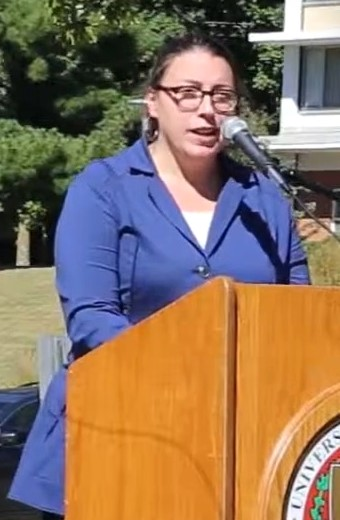
- Corrigan c. 2015
- Born: McDonaldsville, Ohio
- Occupation: Professor of Communication

Academic background
- Education: University of Pittsburgh (B.A.); University of Maryland, College Park (M.A., Ph.D.)

Academic work
- Discipline: African American History
- Institutions: University of Arkansas
- Notable works: Prison Power (2016); Black Feelings (2020)

Lisa M. Corrigan is an American academic. She is professor of communication at the University of Arkansas and also works in the departments for African American Studies and Latino studies, as well as serving as director of the gender studies program. An Ohioan, her childhood was spent with a heavy interest in learning and in social justice topics, which led to a conflicted relationship with her father and a supporting one with her mother. Earning degrees involving rhetoric, political communication, and women's studies, she went on to become a professor focused on how the development and impact of rhetoric in the civil rights movement helped form the basis of the black power movement.

== Childhood and education ==
Born in McDonaldsville, Ohio, to a steel-worker father and a nursing home worker mother, Corrigan had a complicated childhood due to constant layoffs in the steel manufacturing industry during her early years. She and her sister were in middle and high school while their mother was taking college classes, and Corrigan remembers the events as having been "really formative because we were going to college with her when we were in junior high school". Precocious as a child, Corrigan recalls reading voraciously, and getting into conflict with her teachers due to her intellect and correcting mistakes made by her English teachers.

There were also arguments with her father due to her social justice leanings, even in childhood, conflicting with her father's more conservative viewpoint. However, she found accord and full support from her mother, with them both often speaking of gender equality and sexism. Her mother also supported both sisters attending some form of higher education. To support Corrigan's academic growth, her mother pushed her to join the high school debate team, which she excelled at as a political and academic competition. Her success in the club at national-level debate events led to her receiving a scholarship for starting college.

She graduated with a Bachelor's degree in communication and English literature from the University of Pittsburgh. She went on to earn a master's degree in rhetoric and political communication from the University of Maryland, College Park, before also earning a Ph.D. from the university in the same fields and an additional focus on women's studies. She then accepted an assistant professor position at the University of Arkansas and later became an associate professor, before becoming a full professor at the university.

== Career ==
Published in 2016, the first book that Corrigan released, Prison Power: How Prison Politics Influenced the Movement for Black Liberation, investigated prison memoirs by black activists involved in the 1960s United States civil rights movement. Through this lens, she showed how imprisoned activists used their incarceration to organize their political activities and expressed the rhetoric that would form the black power ideologies. She also discussed in an interview the difficulties of publishing and promoting the book, as reviewers of the pre-publication version, who she noted were predominantly ethnically white, refused to believe the black power movement as influential or important for the civil rights effort.

Her second book was published in 2020 and titled Black Feelings: Race and Affect in the Long Sixties, which references back to the 1960s Black Arts Movement and the 1969 Negro Digest article "We Are Our Feeling: The Black Aesthetic". This piece by Ameer (Amiri) Baraka is used as a jumping-off point to discuss the viewpoint of the self in the black community and how emotions were a part of the Black Power movement and a response to the political and racial violence of the time period. In particular, it analyzed how the movement utilized emotional rhetoric in response to the ideology of "white hope" pushed by the Kennedy administration.

Acting as editor for an essay collection, Corrigan published the book #MeToo: A Rhetorical Zeitgeist in 2021. She also acts as co-host for the podcast Lean Back: Critical Feminist Conversations. Hosted with Laura Weiderhaft, each episode features a single topic, frequently a social topic such as "Shame" and "Vulnerability", and is discussed by both hosts for 30 minutes. The creation of the podcast and its choice of name was decided as a response to Sheryl Sandberg's brand "Lean In" and other related "women's empowerment" brands that were actually "asking women to embrace a white supremacist, sexist, exploitative culture for their own personal gain". It was chosen as one of the best podcasts of 2017 by Paste Magazine. Her third forthcoming book was initially tentatively titled Rhetorical Intimacies, which was related to a lecture series she started covering the impact of desegregation on political intimacy between the black community, the government, and non-black communities. The book's potential title was later changed to Intimacy Regimes: Race, Sex, and Power at Mid-century.

== Awards and honors ==
For Prison Power, Corrigan was given the 2017 Diamond Anniversary Book Award and the 2017 African American Communication and Culture Division's Outstanding Book Award from the National Communication Association. Her following book, Black Feelings, was given an honorable mention for the 2021 Marie Hochmuth-Nichols Book Award for Outstanding Scholarship in Public Address from the same organization.

== Bibliography ==
- —, ed. (2021). #MeToo: A Rhetorical Zeitgeist. Taylor & Francis. p. 142. ISBN 9781000523669.
- — (2020). Black Feelings: Race and Affect in the Long Sixties. University Press of Mississippi. p. 238. ISBN 9781496827968.
- — (2016). Prison Power: How Prison Influenced the Movement for Black Liberation. University Press of Mississippi. p. 208. ISBN 9781496809100.
