= Lenny Roberts =

American baseball umpire (1922-2008)

Leonard Wyatt Roberts (September 18, 1922 – February 10, 2008) was an American professional baseball umpire. He umpired in Major League Baseball in 1953.

== Biography ==
Leonard Roberts was born on September 18, 1922, in Price, North Carolina. Roberts served in the US Navy during World War II. He attended the George Barr Umpire School. Roberts umpired in the West Texas–New Mexico League and the Texas League early in his career.

Roberts was promoted to the National League (NL) in 1953 after Hal Dixon became ill. He remained in the majors that season after Dixon returned, and he was used to provide vacations to seasoned umpires. He was optioned to the American Association before the 1954 season. After one year there, Roberts spent his last few professional seasons back in the West Texas–New Mexico League and the Texas League.

Roberts died in Dallas on February 10, 2008.
