= John Corrigan =

American religion scholar and historian

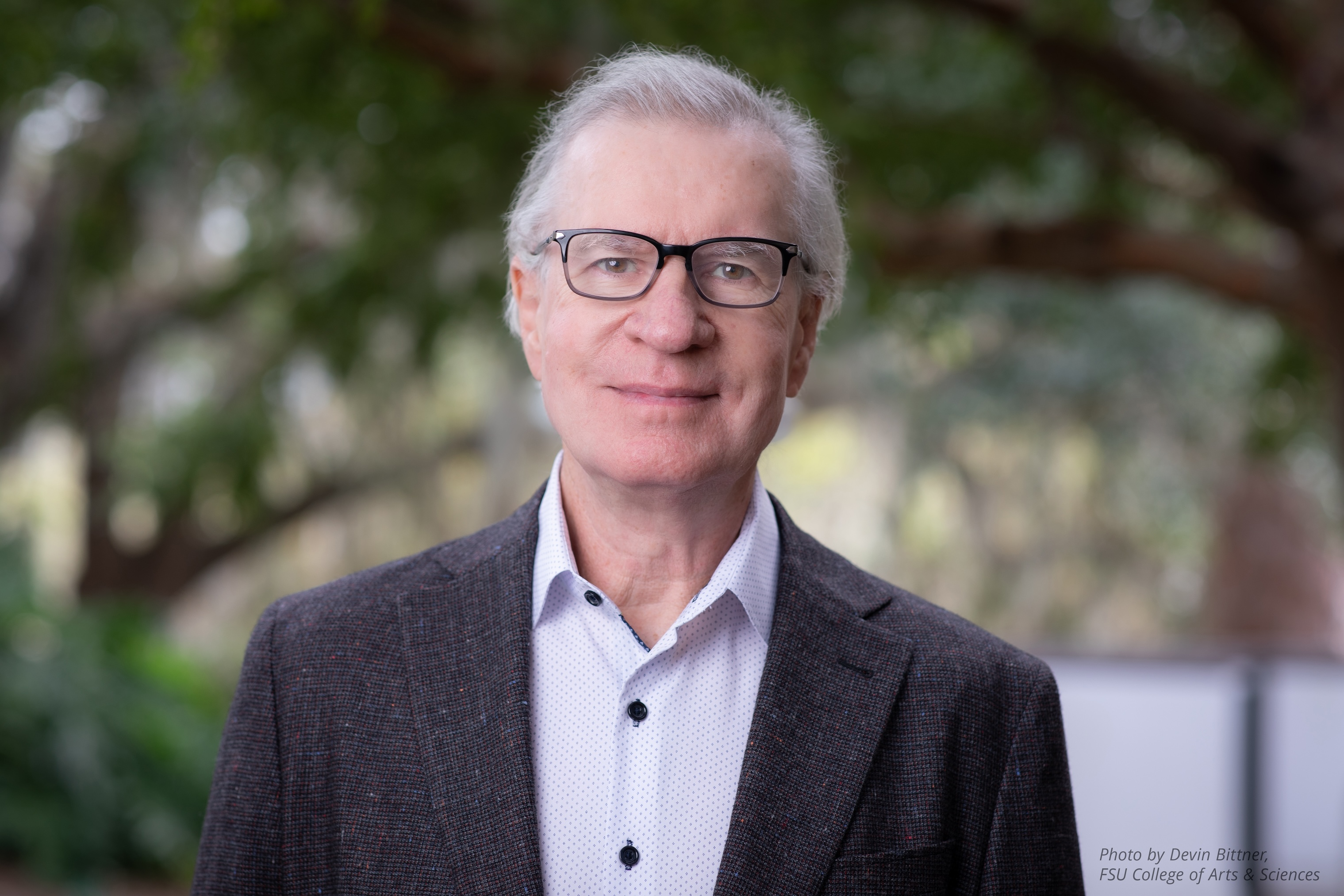
- Born: 1952 (age 73–74); Chicago, Illinois
- Education: University of Chicago
- Occupations: scholar, professor
- Employer: Florida State University
- Notable work: Religion in America; The Hidden Balance; The Prism of Piety; Business of the Heart; Emptiness; The Spatial Humanities; Deep Maps and Spatial Narratives
- Title: Lucius Moody Bristol Distinguished Professor of Religion, Professor of History, and Distinguished Research Professor
- Spouse: Sheila Curran
- Awards: National Endowment for the Humanities Fellow; National Humanities Center Fellow; Andrew W. Mellon Fellow; American Council of Learned Societies Fellow; Alumnus of the Year, University of Chicago Divinity School (2017)
- Website: https://religion.fsu.edu/person/john-corrigan

John Corrigan (born 1952) is an American religion scholar and historian, known for being the author of a number of books on the history of religion and emotion, and the digital humanities. He is the Lucius Moody Bristol Distinguished Professor of Religion and Professor of History, and Distinguished Research Professor at Florida State University (FSU). He is a leader in the academic study of religion and emotion and in the field of the spatial humanities. His narrative histories of religion in America are widely adopted in university courses. He is the founding Director of the FSU Humanities Center.

== Biography ==
Corrigan was born in Chicago, Illinois in October, 1952. He studied English Romantic poetry as a college undergraduate, writing a thesis on the poetry of William Blake. Following his graduation in 1972 he resided in different parts of the U.S. and was employed at various times as a cab driver, cook, tree surgeon, in a textile mill, on a farm, at a zoo, and in an office, eventually returning to Chicago where he worked as a union bricklayer. He undertook doctoral work in American religious history at the University of Chicago, defending with distinction a Ph.D. dissertation about the Revolutionary era in 1982.

Corrigan subsequently held academic posts at the University of Virginia, Harvard University, Arizona State University, Oxford University, University of London, University of Halle-Wittenberg, Columbia University, and University College (Dublin), and as a visiting scholar at the American Academy in Rome, Research Associate at the American Antiquarian Society, and the Fulbright Distinguished Research Chair for the Netherlands. He was a Fulbright Specialist for Australia. He joined the religion and history departments at Florida State University in 2001, where he also was the founding director of the Institute for the Study of Emotion.

Corrigan was coeditor of the journal Church History: Studies in Christianity and Culture (Cambridge University Press) from 2003 to 2016. He was editor of the Chicago History of American Religion, a book series published by the University of Chicago Press, and is co-editor of The Spatial Humanities, a book series published by Indiana University Press and Routledge. He is editor-in-chief of The Oxford Encyclopedia of Religion in America.

== Scholarship ==
Corrigan's contributions to scholarship are in three overlapping areas: American religious history, religion and emotion, and the spatial humanities.

=== American religious history ===
Corrigan has written books that collectively address the sweep of American religious history from the colonial period to the present. Those books take emotion to be a central part of religious life and analyze it historically. The Hidden Balance (1987) argued that certain key eighteenth-century American religious thinkers and social theorists understood thinking and feeling to be conjoined in religious life just as they were in social and political life. The Prism of Piety (1991) proposed that understandings of emotion as a physical experience were central to the religious lives of colonial New Englanders. In Business of the Heart (2002) Corrigan evidenced the way in which emotion was imagined as a commodity in the nineteenth century, exchanged between individuals according to feeling rules, and conceptualized as both affective capital and a medium of trade between persons and a Protestant God. Emptiness: Feeling Christian in America (2015) tracked the deliberate Christian cultivation of the feeling of emptiness throughout American history and the social divisions related to that. The Feeling of Forgetting: Christianity, Race, and Violence in America analyzed the role of religion in facilitating the suppression of American memories of violence against Native Americans and African Americans. The topic of emotion is prominent in his textbook Religion in America.

Corrigan's study of emotion led him to the specific feeling of hatred. His books on religious intolerance directly address the problem of religious hatred and how historically it has issued in violence. Religious Intolerance in America (co-authored with Lynn Neal, 2010), and Religious Intolerance, America, and the World (2020) analyze the history of religious intolerance in America, sometimes with an eye to broader global developments, and in relation to feeling as a central aspect of religiously-inspired violence.

=== The study of religion and emotion ===
Corrigan has claimed that the historical and critical study of emotion is crucial to the advancement of the academic field of religious studies. He contends that a residual parochialism in the field, which equated something thought to be mysterious about religion with something thought to be equally mysterious about emotion, framed emotion as an irreducible datum and discouraged analytical and scientific approaches to its study. His approach combines the history of emotions with insights drawn from philosophy, anthropology, psychology, and brain science. He has advised that scholars must take care to avoid creating a highly specialized and technical "secret language" to talk about emotion if progress is to be made investigating it alongside religion. He has maintained that the most promising approach is through interdisciplinary collaborations. Religion and Emotion: Approaches and Interpretations (2004), The Oxford Handbook of Religion and Emotion (2006), Feeling Religion (2018), and Emotions and Monotheism (2024) are efforts to bring a wide field of disciplinary perspectives and voices to the study of religion and emotion.

=== Spatial humanities ===
The term "spatial humanities," which has been globally adopted, was coined by Corrigan, David Bodenhamer, and Trevor Harris at an expert workshop at the Polis Center in 2008. It identifies a collaboration between humanities scholars and other researchers, and especially the ways in which scholarship that exploits digitally-enabled representations of space (through GIS and media software) can help to bridge the epistemological divide between the humanities and the sciences. Corrigan and others have proposed that the "deep map," a detailed, multilayered, fluid, and polyvocal representation of space that blends quantitative and qualitative data, is a promising tool for the study of culture. That idea, outlined in Deep Maps (2015), informs parts of the multi-volume Oxford Encyclopedia of Religion in America (2018), one-fifth of which is dedicated to the topic of religion and space.

== Reception ==
Corrigan's focus on religion, emotion, space, and power amounts to what the London Times Literary Supplement characterized as an effort to demonstrate how religion seeks to "mediate a comprehensive map of the world." It is a history that offers "a complex account of group identity and boundary-making." While Corrigan has "explicitly brought emotions and religion under the analytical microscope," and for that has been called "our doyen of the study of religion and emotion," his research has been criticized as more history of emotions than history of religion and for overestimating forms of social control, including the power of emotional scripts.

== Academic awards ==
Corrigan has been awarded fellowships for professors from the National Endowment for the Humanities, National Humanities Center, Andrew W. Mellon Foundation, American Council of Learned Societies, the Center for Antiracist Research, and the Fulbright Commission. In 2017 he was designated Alumnus of the Year of the University of Chicago Divinity School. In 2016 he was named the Director of the Jessie Ball du Pont Faculty Seminar at the National Humanities Center.

== Books ==
The Hidden Balance: Religion and the Social Theories of Charles Chauncy and Jonathan Mayhew (Cambridge University Press, 1987; paperback, 2006)

The Prism of Piety: Catholick Congregationalist Clergy at the Beginning of the Enlightenment (Oxford University Press, 1991)

Religion in America: An Historical Account of the Development of American Religious Life, 5th (revised) ed., co-author with Winthrop Hudson, (Macmillan, 1992)

Jews, Christians, Muslims: A Comparative Introduction to Monotheistic Religions, general editor and co-author with Carlos M. N. Eire, Frederick Denny, and Martin S. Jaffee (Prentice Hall, 1998)

Readings in Judaism, Christianity, and Islam: Introductory Reader in Monotheistic Religions, co-editor with Carlos M. N. Eire, Frederick Denny, and Martin S. Jaffee (Prentice Hall, 1998)

Religion in America: An Historical Account of the Development of American Religious Life, co-author with Winthrop Hudson, 6th (revised) edition, (Prentice Hall, 1998)

Religion and Emotion: A Critical Appraisal and Annotated Bibliography, co-author with John M. Kloos and Eric Crump (Greenwood, 2000)

Business of the Heart: Religion and Emotion in the Nineteenth Century (University of California Press, 2002)

Religion in America: An Historical Account of the Development of American Religious Life, co-author with Winthrop Hudson, 7th (revised) edition (Prentice Hall, 2003)

Religion and Emotion: Approaches and Interpretations, ed. (Oxford University Press, 2004)

French and Spanish Missions in Colonial America, co-author with Tracy Leavelle, (California Digital Library/University of California-Berkeley, 2005)

The Oxford Handbook of Religion and Emotion, ed. (Oxford University Press, 2007)

Religious Intolerance in America: A Documentary History, coauthor with Lynn Neal (University of North Carolina Press, 2010)

Religion in American History, co-editor with Amanda Porterfield (Blackwell, 2010)

The Spatial Humanities: GIS and the Future of Humanities Scholarship, co-editor with David Bodenhamer and Trevor Harris (Indiana University Press, 2010)

Religion in America: An Historical Account of the Development of American Religious Life, co-author with Winthrop Hudson, 8th (revised) edition, (Pearson, 2010)

Jews, Christians, Muslims, co-author with Carlos M. N. Eire, Frederick Denny, and Martin S. Jaffee, 2nd ed. (Pearson, 2010)

Deep Maps and Spatial Narratives, co-editor with David Bodenhamer and Trevor M. Harris (Indiana University Press, 2015)

Emptiness: Feeling Christian in America (University of Chicago Press, 2015)

Jews, Christians, Muslims: A Comparative Introduction to Monotheistic Religions, general editor and co-author with Carlos M. Eire, Frederick Denny, and Martin S. Jaffee, (Routledge, 2015), reprint

Religion in America: An Historical Account of the Development of American Religious Life, co-author with Winthrop Hudson, 8th edition, (Routledge, 2015)

Feeling Religion, ed., (Duke University Press, 2017)

The Business Turn in American Religious History, co-editor with Amanda Porterfield and Darren Grem (Oxford University Press, 2017)

Religion, Space, and the Atlantic World, ed. (University of South Carolina Press, 2017)

The Oxford Encyclopedia of Religion in America, editor-in-chief, 3 vols., (Oxford University Press, 2018)

Return to Sender: American Evangelical Missions to Europe in the 20th century, ed. with Frank Hinkelmann (LIT Verlag, 2018)

Religious Intolerance, America, and the World: A History of Forgetting and Remembering (University of Chicago Press, 2020)

Making Deep Maps, coedited with David Bodenhamer and Trevor Harris (Routledge, 2021)

Global Faith and Worldly Power: Evangelical Internationalism and U.S. Empire, co-edited with Melani McAlister and Axel Schafer (University of North Carolina Press, 2022).

The Feeling of Forgetting: Christianity, Race, and Violence in America (University of Chicago Press, 2023).

Emotions and Monotheism (Cambridge University Press, 2024).

== Personal ==
Corrigan lives with his wife Sheila Curran, a novelist, in Tallahassee. He has experimented in joining his academic research to musical composition in various projects including the album Imperical Data From Mandalay.
