= Carrigans =

Carrigans may refer to one of these places in Ulster in the island of Ireland:

- Carrigans, County Armagh, a townland; see List of townlands of County Armagh
- Carrigans, County Donegal, a village
- The name of two townlands in County Donegal; see List of townlands of County Donegal
- Carrigans, County Fermanagh, a townland in County Fermanagh.
- Carrigans, County Tyrone, a townland in County Tyrone.

== See also ==
- Carrigans railway station
