= Tom Currigan =

American politician (1920–2014)

Thomas G. Currigan

39th Mayor of Denver
- In office 1963 – December 31, 1968
- Preceded by: Richard Batterton
- Succeeded by: William H. McNichols, Jr.

Personal details
- Born: July 8, 1920 Denver, Colorado, U.S.
- Died: December 27, 2014 (aged 94) Chicago, Illinois, U.S.
- Spouse(s): Frances R. Koetting (m.1975–2013; her death)

Military service
- Allegiance: United States
- Branch/service: United States Air Force
- Rank: Captain

Thomas Guida Currigan (July 8, 1920 – December 27, 2014) was Auditor of Denver, Colorado, from 1955 to 1963 and Denver Democratic Party Mayor from 1963 to 1968.

Currigan was the grandson of Martin D. Currigan. He graduated from University of Notre Dame in 1941. He joined the military in 1942 during the World War II era and was discharged as a captain in the United States Air Force in 1946. He worked for Remington Rand Company. He died on December 27, 2014, at a nursing home in Chicago, Illinois, aged 94.
