= Justice Corrigan =

Justice Corrigan may refer to:

- Carol Corrigan (born 1948), associate justice of the Supreme Court of California
- J. J. P. Corrigan (1901–1982), associate justice of the Ohio Supreme Court
- Maura D. Corrigan (born 1948), associate justice and chief justice of the Michigan Supreme Court
