= Carrigan v Redwood =

- Court: High Court of New Zealand
- Full case name: Carrigan v Redwood
- Decided: 17 October 1910
- Citation: [1910] NZGazLawRp 193; (1910) 30 NZLR 244; (1910) 13 GLR 183
- Transcript: High Court judgment

Court membership
- Judge sitting: Cooper J

Carrigan v Redwood [1910] NZGazLawRp 193; (1910) 30 NZLR 244; (1910) 13 GLR 183 is a cited case in New Zealand law regarding trusts.
