= Dennis Corrigan =

American illustrator (born 1944)

Dennis Corrigan (born 1944) is a contemporary American Surrealist known for his whimsical, sometimes dark, paintings, drawings, prints, and NFTS. His works are in permanent collections of the Metropolitan Museum of Art in New York City, the Brooklyn Museum, the Philadelphia Museum of Art, the Arts Council of Great Britain and the Library of Congress, in addition to numerous private collectors who range from priests to rock stars. His 1972 work Queen Victoria Troubled by Flies is in the collection of the Fine Arts Museums of San Francisco, He has accepted illustration commissions from The New York Times, New York Magazine, RCA Records, Random House Publishers, Pan American Airways, Horizon Magazine, David R. Godine publishers, Boston, Alfred A. Knopf Inc. in New York, and Dell Publishing.

He currently teaches Drawing, Painting and 2-D & 3-D Design art at Marywood University in Scranton, Pennsylvania. Other teaching appointments include Philadelphia College of Art, Tyler School of Art in Elkin's Park PA, and The Kubert School in Dover NJ.
