= McDonaldsville, Ohio =

Unincorporated community in Ohio, U.S.

Coordinates: 40°53′10″N 81°28′46″W

McDonaldsville is an unincorporated community in Stark County, in the U.S. state of Ohio.

== History ==
McDonaldsville was platted in 1829, and supposedly was named for a general in the Revolutionary War named McDonald whom the founder admired. Lack of railroad facilities inhibited the town's early growth. A post office called McDonaldsville was established in 1852, and remained in operation until 1906.
