= Jack Corrigan (lawyer) =

American lawyer

Jack Corrigan (born 1956) was born in Somerville, Massachusetts on September 29, 1956. He graduated from Boston College High School, Harvard University, and Harvard Law School. He is currently a Boston lawyer, a teacher at Harvard Law, and a Democratic Operative.

Corrigan served as Convention manager of the 2004 Democratic National Convention and is credited with giving US President Barack Obama the national stage from which he achieved national prominence. Corrigan also was a senior member of Michael Dukakis's 1988, Presidential Campaign and head lawyer of Palm Beach County for the Gore Campaign during the 2000 Presidential Election Florida Recount before being put in charge of the state of Florida for the final 24 hours of the recount.
