= Federico Peña =

American politician and attorney (born 1947)

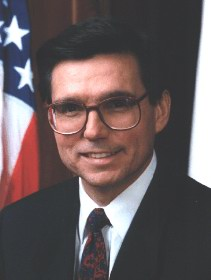

8th United States Secretary of Energy
- In office March 12, 1997 – June 30, 1998
- President: Bill Clinton
- Preceded by: Hazel R. O'Leary
- Succeeded by: Bill Richardson

12th United States Secretary of Transportation
- In office January 21, 1993 – February 14, 1997
- President: Bill Clinton
- Preceded by: Andrew Card
- Succeeded by: Rodney E. Slater

41st Mayor of Denver
- In office July 2, 1983 – July 15, 1991
- Preceded by: William H. McNichols Jr.
- Succeeded by: Wellington Webb

Member of the Colorado House of Representatives
- In office January 3, 1979 – July 2, 1983
- Preceded by: Ruben Valdez

Personal details
- Born: Federico Fabian Peña; March 15, 1947 (age 79) Laredo, Texas, U.S.
- Party: Democratic
- Spouses: Ellen Hart (m. 1988; div. 2001); Cindy Velasquez (m. 2006)
- Children: 3
- Education: University of Texas, Austin (BA, JD)

Federico Fabian Peña (born March 15, 1947) is an American politician and attorney who served as the 12th United States secretary of transportation from 1993 to 1997 and the 8th United States secretary of energy from 1997 to 1998, during the presidency of Bill Clinton. He previously served as the 41st mayor of Denver from 1983 to 1991.

== Early life ==
Born in Laredo, Texas, Peña earned a Bachelor of Arts (1969) and Juris Doctor (1972) from the University of Texas at Austin and the University of Texas School of Law, respectively.

== Career ==
Moving to Colorado, where he became a practicing attorney, Peña was elected to the Colorado House of Representatives as a Democrat in 1979, where he rose to become Minority Leader.

=== Mayor of Denver ===
In 1983, Peña defeated William H. McNichols Jr., a 74-year old incumbent, to become the first Hispanic mayor of Denver, a post to which he was re-elected in 1987. During his time as mayor in the late 1980s and early 1990s, he was instrumental in bringing the Colorado Rockies baseball team to Denver in 1993 .

=== Clinton administration ===
Peña advised Arkansas Governor Bill Clinton on transportation issues during Clinton's presidential transition and thereafter Clinton chose Peña to head the United States Department of Transportation.

In 1995 the Justice Department conducted a preliminary investigation into a California transit agency's awarding of a pension management contract to Peña's former investment management firm. However, Peña had severed all ties to his former company both prior to the contract and prior to becoming Transportation Secretary. On March 17, 1995 Janet Reno ended the investigation.

Although he had intended to leave Clinton's cabinet after a single term, Peña also served as secretary of energy from 1997 to 1998. During his 18-month tenure, Peña led an organization of 16,000 direct employees with a budget of $18 billion. He developed the Clinton administration's Comprehensive National Energy Strategy and oversaw the largest privatization in the history of the U.S. Government—the $3.654 billion sale of the Elk Hills Oil Field, formerly known as Naval Petroleum Reserve No. 1. He crafted the Clinton Administration's strategy for oil and gas development in the Caspian Sea region and supported U.S. energy companies' investments around the world.

=== Later career ===
Upon leaving the Clinton administration, Peña returned to Denver. In August 1998, he joined private equity firm Vestar Capital Partners where he is a senior advisor.

Peña Boulevard, a freeway in Denver and neighboring Aurora connecting Denver International Airport to Interstate 70, is named for him. As mayor of Denver, Peña led the effort to build the airport. In addition, Peña's vision ("Imagine a Great City") resulted in the revitalization of Denver economy with a new convention center, modernized Cherry Creek Shopping Center, neighborhood retail efforts, expanded library and performing arts center, and recruitment of the Colorado Rockies major league baseball team.

Peña is the father of three children: Nelia, Cristina, and Ryan Peña. The divorce of Federico Peña and his first wife, Ellen Hart Peña, became final on September 10, 2001. Federico Peña married Cindy Velasquez on September 2, 2006. Cindy Velasquez is a former broadcast executive for Channel 7, KMGH-TV, and Channel 9, KUSA-TV, in Denver, Colorado and has a daughter, Pilar.

Peña was a National Co-Chair of the COMPETE Coalition, an organization of energy stakeholders including large power generators, large retail power consumers and energy efficiency/smart grid groups. Today he serves on several corporate boards and is involved in several philanthropic organizations.

On September 7, 2007, Peña announced that he would endorse Senator Barack Obama in the 2008 presidential election, and also serve as Obama's National Campaign Co-chair. The move was notable in that Peña did not endorse Senator Hillary Clinton, the wife of the president under whom he served. On November 5, 2008, he was named to the advisory board of the Obama-Biden Transition Project.

On October 26, 2011, Peña was elected to serve as a member of the Board of Directors of Wells Fargo. Peña was appointed to the University of Denver Board of Trustees in June 2015.

Political offices
Preceded by William McNichols	Mayor of Denver; 1983–1991	Succeeded by Wellington Webb
Preceded by Andrew Card	United States Secretary of Transportation; 1993–1997	Succeeded by Rodney E. Slater
Preceded by Hazel R. O'Leary	United States Secretary of Energy; 1997–1998	Succeeded by Bill Richardson
U.S. order of precedence (ceremonial)
Preceded by Robert Reich as Former U.S. Cabinet Member	Order of precedence of the United States as Former U.S. Cabinet Member	Succeeded by Richard Riley as Former U.S. Cabinet Member
