= Sam Carrigan =

American baseball umpire (1921-2008)

- Born: July 24, 1921; Holyoke, Massachusetts, U.S.
- Died: June 28, 2008 (aged 86); Alamogordo, New Mexico, U.S.
- Occupation: Umpire
- Years active: 1961–1964
- Employer: American League

Herve Samuel Carrigan (July 24, 1921 – June 28, 2008) was an American professional baseball umpire who worked four full seasons in Major League Baseball (April 11, 1961 to October 4, 1964) in the American League.

Carrigan was born in Holyoke, Massachusetts, and briefly played minor league baseball, batting .148 in 25 games as a shortstop for the 1941 Beaver Falls Browns of the Class D Pennsylvania State Association. He served in the United States Navy during World War II.

During his MLB career, Carrigan stood 5 feet 111/2 inches (1.82 m) tall and weighed 185 pounds (84 kg). He joined the American League umpiring staff in 1961 when the league expanded from eight to ten teams. He worked 627 league games over his four MLB seasons, including 152 assignments behind home plate. He ejected 12 uniformed personnel over those four full years in the Junior Circuit.

He moved to Alamogordo, New Mexico, in 1992, and died there at age 86 on June 28, 2008.
