= White Polish =

Ethnicity classification used in the 2011 United Kingdom Census

Total population
- (United Kingdom) Great Britain: 705,080 – 1.1% (2021/22 Census) (Note: Not to be confused with United Kingdom, excludes Northern Ireland); England: 592,562 – 1.1% (2021); Scotland: 90,736 – 1.7% (2022); Wales: 21,782 – 0.7% (2021); Northern Ireland: Unavailable (2021)

Regions with significant populations
- London; Edinburgh; Glasgow; Southampton; Aberdeen; Leeds; North Northamptonshire; Birmingham

Languages
- British English · Polish

Religion
- Predominantly Christianity

Related ethnic groups
- Other White people

White Polish is an ethnicity classification used in Scotland at the 2011 United Kingdom Census. In the 2021 census, the White Polish ethnic group totalled 705,080 in Great Britain, 90,736 of which were in Scotland making up 1.67% of the total population of Scotland at the time.

In England and Wales, the category is not its own section like Scotland meaning write-in answers for "White Polish" are designated under the broader Other White group. However, the Office for National Statistics does provide data on the exact number of individuals who identified themselves as falling under the 'White Polish' ethnic category whereas the Northern Ireland Statistics and Research Agency does not.

The Scottish Government's policy since 2011, however, has been to include "White Polish" as a specific subgrouping of the 5,084,407 white people recorded in Scotland at the last UK census. Other subgroupings in Scotland's census are "White Scottish", "White Other British", "White Irish", "White Gypsy / Traveller", and "White Other White".

== Terminology ==
=== Local government, NHS and police ===
Outside of the national census, many county councils additionally use the "White Polish" category in local statistics, as do Police Scotland, and regional health boards of NHS Scotland. Some of the local governments that use the category include Angus Council and Dundee City Council.

== Demographics ==
White Polish ethnic group by region and country
Region / Country	2021 (Note: 2021/22: England and Wales; and Scotland)		2011 (Note: 2011: England and Wales; and Scotland)	
Region / Country	Number	%	Number	%
England	592,562	1.05%	517,001	0.98%
—Greater London	116,056	1.32%	175,974	2.15%
—South East	91,470	0.99%	73,571	0.85%
—East Midlands	68,623	1.41%	28,676	0.63%
—East of England	66,321	1.05%	55,573	0.95%
—North West	65,065	0.88%	64,930	0.92%
—West Midlands	62,984	1.06%	55,216	0.99%
—Yorkshire and the Humber	60,383	1.10%	26,410	0.50%
—South West	51,397	0.90%	28,616	0.54%
—North East	10,261	0.39%	8,035	0.31%
Scotland (Note: Scotland held its census a year later after the rest of the United Kingdom due to the COVID-19 pandemic. As a result, data shown is for 2022 as opposed to 2021.)	90,736	1.67%	61,201	1.16%
Wales	21,782	0.70%	14,086	0.46%
(United Kingdom) Great Britain	705,080	1.08%	592,288	0.97%

=== Population and distribution ===
White Polish population pyramid in 2021 (in England and Wales)

The distribution of people who consider themselves to be White Polish is most concentrated in North East Scotland, with up to 3 per cent in Aberdeen at the 2011 census. Edinburgh had around a 3 per cent White Polish populace, and Dundee a 1.4 per cent, at the latest census. As of June 2015, around 3,000 people who identified with the category resided in Fife, which amounted to 0.8% the county's population.

Despite there being a long history of Polish immigration to Scotland, and therefore Polish ancestry within the country, data from the 2011 census suggests that the Scottish-born White Polish population were overwhelming the children of recent Polish migrants. Analyzed in Scottish Affairs, 80 per cent of White Polish infants were under the age of 3, suggesting that Scottish residents with Polish ancestry dating further back (such as the significant migrations of Poles during and after World War II) were most likely identifying as White Scottish.

As the category was introduced in 2011, in statistical research White Polish data is sometimes compared with the category of Other White for pre-2011 analysis.

=== Economic status and language ===
In the 2011 census results, at 56 per cent; White Polish people were most likely to be working as a full-time employee. The data also showed that people who self-identified as White Polish were most likely to be economically active in Scotland, at rate of 86 per cent of the group. In 2020, a Global Health Policy Unit publication identified 35 per cent of the grouping as working in "elementary occupations", which linked this to health risks, such as disproportionate exposure to COVID-19.

In 2011, the General Register Office for Scotland found that 1 per cent of the population used the Polish language at home exclusively, which was around the same percentage as use of Scots, and twice that of Scottish Gaelic.

=== Religion ===
Statistically, White Polish are more likely to be Christian than other religions. According to the 2011 UK Census, 49,537 White Polish (nearly 81%) are Christian in Scotland, the vast majority of which are Roman Catholic (46,963 persons), with smaller representations being Church of Scotland (524 persons), and 2,050 registering as "Other Christian".

Religion	Percentage of White Polish population	Number
Christianity	80.94%	49,537
No religion	11.30%	6,916
Judaism	0.06%	39
Islam	0.21%	130
Buddhism	0.15%	95
Hinduism	0.01%	9
Sikhism	>0.01%	4
Not Stated	7.17%	4,393
Other religions	0.13%	78
Total	100%	61,201

== Social and health issues ==
=== Discrimination ===
Between 2013 and 2014, Police Scotland data showed that up to 14 per cent of victims of racist incidents fell under the category of White Polish. Between April and June 2015, Police Scotland Forth Valley division's statistics (covering Clackmannanshire, Falkirk and Stirling) found that those defined as "White Polish" were the victims in 4.8% of the recorded hate crime-related incidents.

In 2020, the Daily Record reported accounts from former students of racial discrimination directed towards people who identified as, or were perceived to be, White Polish, at St Augustine's R.C. High School in Edinburgh.

=== Health ===
Scottish residents in the White Polish category generally reported good health under the age of 65. Both men and women, who listed themselves as White Polish, recorded almost half the rates of ill health than those of men and women identifying as White Scottish. A 2019 Ethnicity & Health analysis also demonstrated better health among the White Polish population compared with White Scottish data.

Between 12 March and 14 June 2020, of the 4,070 recorded COVID-19-involved deaths in Scotland, the White Polish group had one of the lowest shares at less than 0.1%, compared with White Irish at 1.3%, and White Scottish at 88.6%. In May 2020, a University of Edinburgh report associated the group's tendency to "elementary occupations" with risk of exposure to the virus.

=== Housing ===
In 2011, people in the category of White Polish were most likely to experience overcrowding in Scottish households.

== See also ==
- Ethnic groups in the United Kingdom
- Demographics of the United Kingdom
- Demographics of Scotland
- List of United Kingdom censuses
- Classification of ethnicity in the United Kingdom
- National Statistics Socio-economic Classification
- Genetic history of the British Isles
- Historical immigration to Great Britain
- List of English districts and their ethnic composition
- Poles
- Polish people in the United Kingdom
