= White Irish =

Ethnicity classification used in the United Kingdom Census

- Distribution by regional area at the 2011 census

Total population
- (United Kingdom) Great Britain: 564,342 – 0.9% (2021/22 Census) (Note: Not to be confused with United Kingdom, excludes Northern Ireland); England: 494,251 – 0.9% (2021); Scotland: 56,877 – 1.0% (2022); Wales: 13,214 – 0.4% (2021); Northern Ireland: 520,586 – 28.7% (2011) (Note: Northern Ireland (including all White people reporting at least Irish or Irish with one of more additional national identities)) (Note: The 2021 Census in Northern Ireland does not provide a separate group for White Irish.)

Regions with significant populations
- London; Hertfordshire; Birmingham; Surrey; Essex; Glasgow; Kent; Edinburgh

Languages
- British English · Hiberno-English · Irish; Scottish Gaelic · Scots · Ulster Scots · Shelta

Religion
- Predominantly Christianity (71.6%); minority follows other faiths (1.5%) (Note: Including Buddhism (0.3%), Islam (0.3%), Judaism (0.2%), Hinduism (0.04%) and Sikhism (0.01%)) or are irreligious (21.5%); 2021 census, England and Wales only

White Irish is an ethnicity classification used in the census in the United Kingdom for England, Scotland and Wales. In the 2021 census, the White Irish population was 564,342 or 0.9% of Great Britain's total population. This was a slight fall from the 2011 census which recorded 585,177 or 1% of the total population.

This total does not include the White Irish population estimate for Northern Ireland, where only the term 'White' is used in ethnic classification and such White British people and White Irish are amalgamated. National identity is listed separately in NI, where 28.7% of those who identified as White classified themselves as Irish only or Irish with one or more additional categories (e.g. Irish and Northern Irish at 1.1%), making up a significant portion of the population.

== Terminology ==
=== Census classifications ===
For the 2011 census, in England and Wales the ethnicity self-classification section included the category of White Irish as the second option, after White British. Where Scotland differs in the White British category, by breaking down the option into two different categories (White Scottish and Other White British); the Scottish census maintains the same naming convention, listing White Irish as the third option in the ethnic group section. In Northern Ireland, the White Irish classification did not appear, the only choice being 'White'.

National Identity is listed separately in Northern Ireland, with those who identified themselves as White in the 2011 census choosing one or more options. 'White' and 'Irish' made up 455,161 (25.1 per cent) out of a total population of 1,810,863 (of all ethnic backgrounds). When including those who listed themselves as 'White', and 'Irish' or 'Irish' plus one, or more, other National Identity; there were 520,586 persons (28.7 per cent). These additional White multi-identity groupings included combinations such as "White: Irish and Northern Irish" at 19,044 (1.1 per cent), "White: British and Irish" at 11,684 (0.6 per cent), and "White: British, Irish and Northern Irish" at 18,249 (1.0 per cent).

=== Local government ===
Outside of national censuses, local governments, councils and NHS districts use the category of White Irish for statistical purposes. For example, Devon County Council has published a diversity guide which defines White Irish people as a black, Asian and minority ethnic (BAME) category. NHS Bradford District also defines White Irish as an ethnic minority group. Kirklees Council uses the abbreviation 'Ethnicity Code' WIRI for White Irish persons.

== Demographics ==
White Irish by region and country
Region / Country	2021 (Note: 2021/22: England and Wales, Scotland, and Northern Ireland)		2011 (Note: 2011: England and Wales, Scotland, and Northern Ireland)		2001 (Note: 2001: England and Wales, Scotland, and Northern Ireland)	
Region / Country	Number	%	Number	%	Number	%
England	494,251	0.87%	517,001	0.93%	624,115	1.27%
—Greater London	156,333	1.78%	175,974	2.15%	220,488	3.07%
—South East	78,219	0.84%	73,571	0.85%	82,405	1.03%
—North West	61,422	0.83%	64,930	0.92%	77,499	1.15%
—East of England	57,964	0.91%	55,573	0.95%	61,208	1.14%
—West Midlands	47,886	0.80%	55,216	0.99%	73,136	1.39%
—South West	31,698	0.56%	28,616	0.54%	32,484	0.66%
—East Midlands	27,130	0.56%	28,676	0.63%	35,478	0.85%
—Yorkshire and the Humber	25,215	0.46%	26,410	0.50%	32,735	0.66%
—North East	8,384	0.32%	8,035	0.31%	8,682	0.35%
Scotland (Note: Scotland held its census a year later after the rest of the United Kingdom due to the COVID-19 pandemic. As a result, data shown is for 2022 as opposed to 2021.)	56,877	1.05%	54,090	1.02%	49,428	0.98%
Wales	13,214	0.43%	14,086	0.46%	17,689	0.61%
(United Kingdom) Great Britain	564,342	0.87%	585,177	0.95%	691,232	1.21%

=== Population and distribution ===
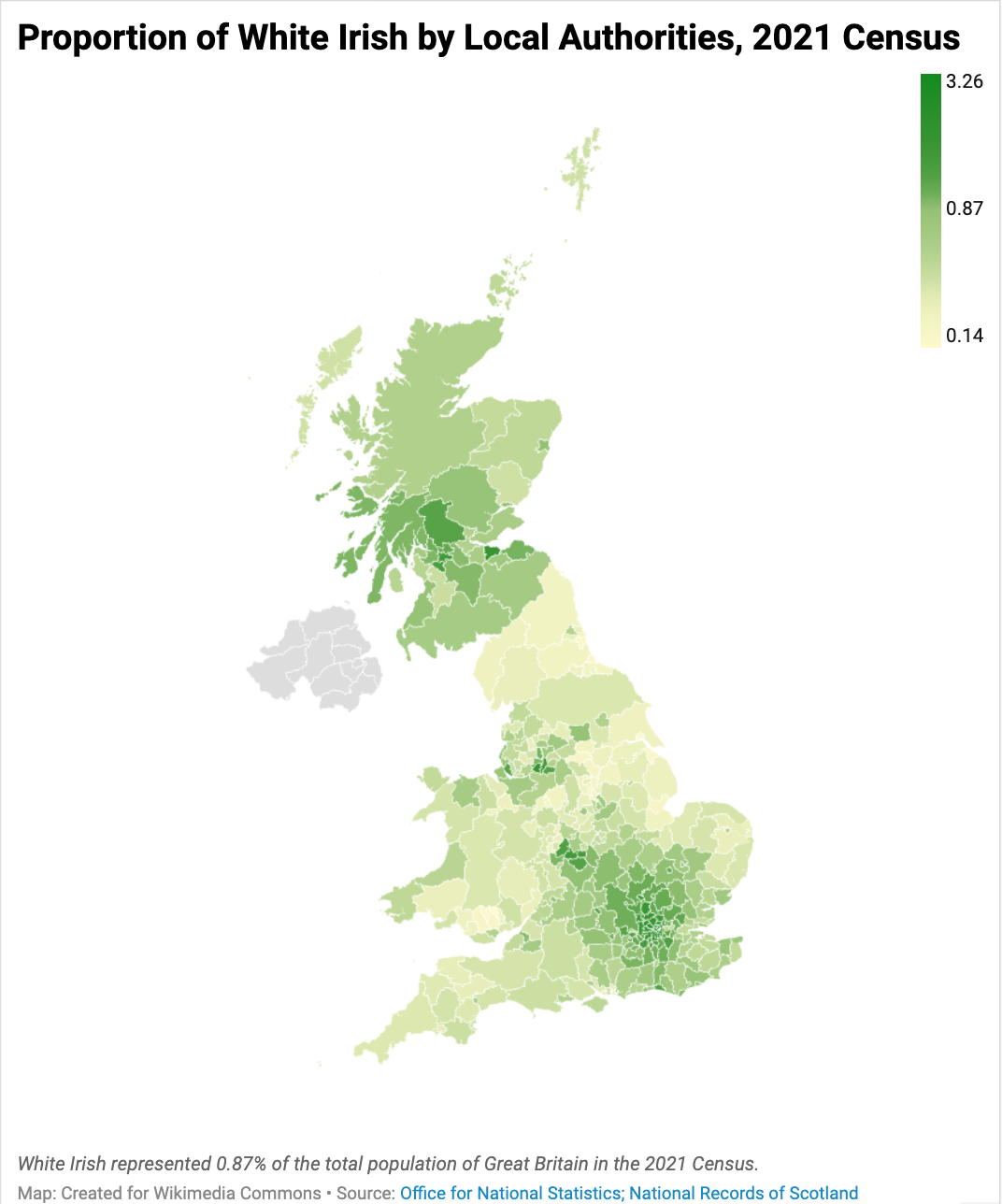
Distribution of White Irish by local authority, 2021 census

Population pyramid of the White Irish in 2021 (in England and Wales)

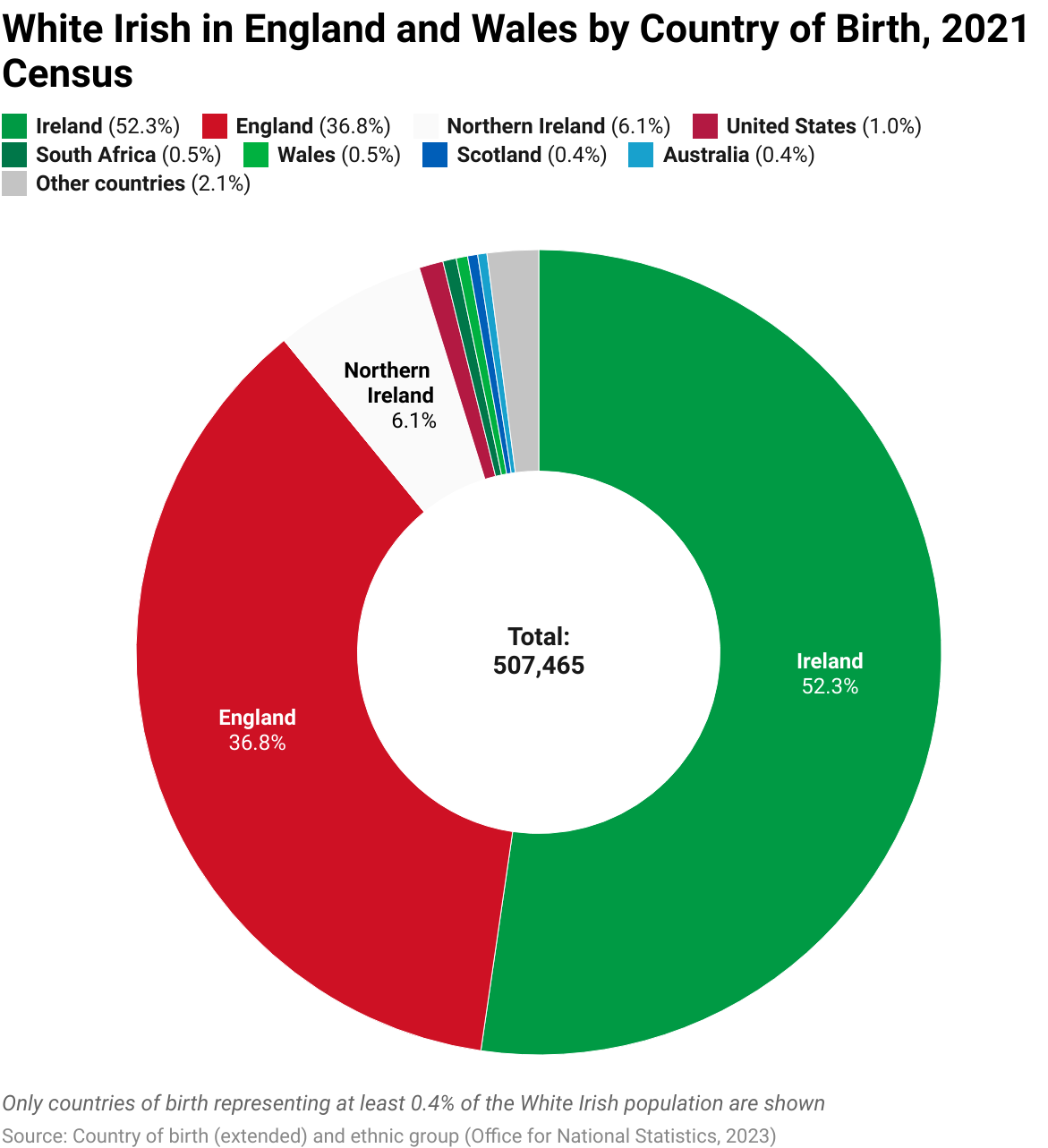
Country of birth (2021 census, England and Wales)

Year of arrival (2021 census, England and Wales)
1. Born in the UK (43.7%)
2. Before 1951 (2.20%)
3. 1951 to 1960 (10.3%)
4. 1961 to 1970 (9.90%)
5. 1971 to 1980 (5.00%)
6. 1981 to 1990 (8.00%)
7. 1991 to 2000 (4.90%)
8. 2001 to 2010 (5.70%)
9. 2011 to 2021 (10.3%)

The 2021 United Kingdom census recorded a population of 564,342 or 0.5% of the population in Great Britain, a 3.56% decline compared to 2011. When broken down by country, England recorded 494,251 (0.9%), Wales recorded 13,214 (0.4%) and the equivalent census in Scotland was recorded a year later, with a population of 56,877, or 1.0% of the population. The ten local authorities with the largest proportion of those who identified as White Irish were all located in Greater London: Islington (3.26%), Brent (2.74%), Hammersmith and Fulham (2.63%), Camden (2.53%), Richmond upon Thames (2.49%), Wandsworth (2.46%), Ealing (2.32%), Haringey (2.16%), the City of London (2.16%) and Hackney (2.15%). Outside of London, Three Rivers in Hertfordshire had the highest proportion at 2.11%. In Scotland, the highest concentration was in Edinburgh at 2.01% and in Wales, the highest proportion was in Conwy at 0.73%.

Between 2001 and 2011, the White Irish population decreased by 18 per cent. Along with the White British population, the group was one of only two ethnic groups to decrease in number in the ten-year period.

As of the 2011 census, in England and Wales, London has by far the highest White Irish population in numbers and by regional proportion, numbering 175,974 inhabitants. The second highest county is the West Midlands with a White Irish population of 39,183, followed by Greater Manchester (34,499) - all other counties are below 20,000 inhabitants.

The district with the highest local White Irish population is the London Borough of Brent (4.0%). Five of the remaining districts above 3.0% are all London boroughs, namely Islington, Hammersmith and Fulham, Camden, Ealing and Harrow; the only one outside London is the unitary authority of Luton (3.0%). By total population, the district with the highest White Irish population is the city of Birmingham, where 22,021 residents identified themselves as being White Irish. The second highest district was London Borough of Brent (12,320), followed by the city of Manchester (11,843) and the London Borough of Ealing (10,428).

Top 15 Areas (2021/22 Census)
Local authority	Population	Percentage
Hertfordshire	18,747	1.6%
Birmingham	16,964	1.5%
Surrey	14,111	1.2%
Essex	11,861	0.8%
Glasgow	11,130	1.8%
Kent	10,850	0.7%
Edinburgh	10,326	2.0%
Manchester	9,442	1.7%
Brent, London	9,314	2.7%
Ealing, London	8,511	2.3%
Wandsworth, London	8,061	2.5%
Hampshire	7,760	0.6%
Barnet, London	7,644	2.0%
Islington, London	7,062	3.3%
Oxfordshire	6,906	1.0%

=== Birthplace ===
In England, about 81 per cent of those born in the Republic of Ireland, at the time of the 2011 census, identified as White Irish. Contrastingly, of those born in Northern Ireland, and living in England, 14 per cent considered themselves White Irish. There were around 174,000 English-born people in the White Irish population of England. These individuals may be three of four generations removed from their ancestors who migrated from Ireland.

=== Religion ===
Statistically and nominally, White Irish are more likely to be Christian than other white Britons. According to the 2011 UK Census, White Irish are 80% Christian in England and Wales, mostly Catholic with some Anglican or other Christian. The percentage of White Irish who are Christians is lower in Scotland, at around 78%, mainly Catholic with some Presbyterian, especially Church of Scotland, and other Christian. In Northern Ireland, however, White Irish is counted simply as White, so the exact number of Christians there who are White Irish is truly unknown.

Percentages and numbers

Religion	England and Wales	Scotland
Christianity	80.14% (425,612)	77.61% (41,981)
No religion	11.07% (58,798)	16.07% (8,690)
Judaism	0.21% (1,134)	0.04% (20)
Islam	0.36% (1,914)	0.11% (61)
Buddhism	0.29% (1,516)	0.23% (124)
Hinduism	0.05% (275)	0.02% (13)
Sikhism	0.03% (152)	0.01% (7)
Not Stated	7.46% (39,631)	5.53% (2,989)
Other religions	0.39% (2,055)	0.38% (205)
Total	100% (531,087)	100% (54,090)

== Society ==
=== Education ===
In 2020 research, the White Irish ethnic group showed the largest Progress 8 benchmark performance gap between those eligible for free school meals and those not.

=== Economics ===
Since 2012, the White Irish ethnic group have held the highest pay amongst all ethnic groups in the UK. In 2019, the median hourly pay was £17.55 per hour, 40.5% higher than the White British. In 2022, the median hourly pay rose to £20.20, 40.1% higher than the White British.

== Social and health issues ==
=== Health ===
A 2009 study published in Ethnicity & Health demonstrated that the grouping self-reported higher rates of poor general health than the White British populace. This was found to be particularly the case in Northern Ireland, for those who had designated themselves as White and with an "Irish" national identity. In 2020, a UCL study based on NHS England data showed that the White Irish group was around 50 per cent less at risk of death from COVID-19 than other black, Asian and minority ethnic (BAME) groups. This was significantly lower than the White British group, which was 12 per cent lower than the average risk for BAME communities.

=== Identity ===
In 2015 research, University of Southampton fellow Dr Rosalind Willis explored the social fragility of the White Irish ethnicity, particularly in England where distinctions between White British and White Irish are, at times, openly denied.

In July 2019, the East Ham constituency Labour branch was criticised for its election of a white Irish woman as the women’s officer for its Black, Asian and Minority Ethnic (BAME) forum. The woman in question self-identified as being an ethnic minority and no objections within the branch were raised against her election. Branch secretary, Syed Taqi Shah, commented that "if somebody self-declares [as BAME], and the Labour Party allows them to do so, they should be respected."

=== Police discrimination ===
In a 1995 study, sociologist Jock Young found that, of 1000 randomly selected residents of Finsbury Park who were asked if they had been stopped by the police over the past year, the White Irish population was disproportionately large at 14.3%, in contrast to 12.8% of Black Caribbean and 5.8% of White British people. The researchers found the Police tactic of 'lurking and larking', whereby constables would wait outside Irish pubs and clubs to make arrests, to be to blame for the high statistics, which was labelled a form of 'institutional racism'.

== See also ==
- Ethnic groups in the United Kingdom
- Demographics of the United Kingdom
- Demographics of England
- Demographics of Scotland
- Demographics of Wales
- Demographics of Northern Ireland
- List of United Kingdom censuses
- Classification of ethnicity in the United Kingdom
- National Statistics Socio-economic Classification
- Genetic history of the British Isles
- Historical immigration to Great Britain
- List of English districts and their ethnic composition
- White Gypsy or Irish Traveller
- Irish Travellers
