= Irish people in Great Britain =

- Distribution of those who identify as "White Irish" in the 2011 census by local authority.

Total population
- 6,000,000 with at least 25% recent Irish ancestry (10% of the British population)

Regions with significant populations
- Throughout Great Britain, especially Edinburgh, Glasgow, London, West Midlands (Birmingham, Wolverhampton, Coventry, Solihull), North West England (Liverpool, Birkenhead, Salford, Bootle, Manchester, Stockport, Bolton, Chester, Barrow-in-Furness, St. Helens, Whitehaven, Cleator Moor, Heywood, Rochdale, Runcorn, Widnes, Ellesmere Port, Skelmersdale), West Yorkshire (Bradford, Keighley, Dewsbury, Batley, Huddersfield), North East England (Newcastle Upon Tyne, Sunderland, Middlesbrough, Hartlepool, Jarrow, Gateshead, South Shields), Swansea, Luton, Portsmouth, Coatbridge and Dundee

Languages
- British English · Hiberno-English · Irish · Shelta · Scots (including Ulster-Scots) ·

Religion
- Christianity; Roman Catholic (majority), Protestant (minority)

Related ethnic groups
- Irish people, Overseas Irish, Irish-Americans, Irish Australians, Irish New Zealanders, Ulster-Scots

Irish people in Great Britain or British Irish are immigrants from the island of Ireland living in Great Britain as well as their British-born descendants.

Irish migration to Great Britain has occurred from the earliest recorded history to the present. There has been a continuous movement of people between the islands of Ireland and Great Britain due to their proximity. This tide has ebbed and flowed in response to politics, economics and social conditions of both places.

Today, millions of residents of Great Britain are either from Ireland or are entitled to an Irish passport due to having a parent or grandparent who was born in Ireland. It is estimated that as many as six million people living in the UK have at least one Irish grandparent (around 10% of the UK population).

The Irish diaspora (Irish: Diaspóra na nGael) refers to Irish people and their descendants who live outside Ireland. This article refers to those who reside in Great Britain, the largest island and principal territory of the United Kingdom.

== Migration eras ==
=== Medieval ===
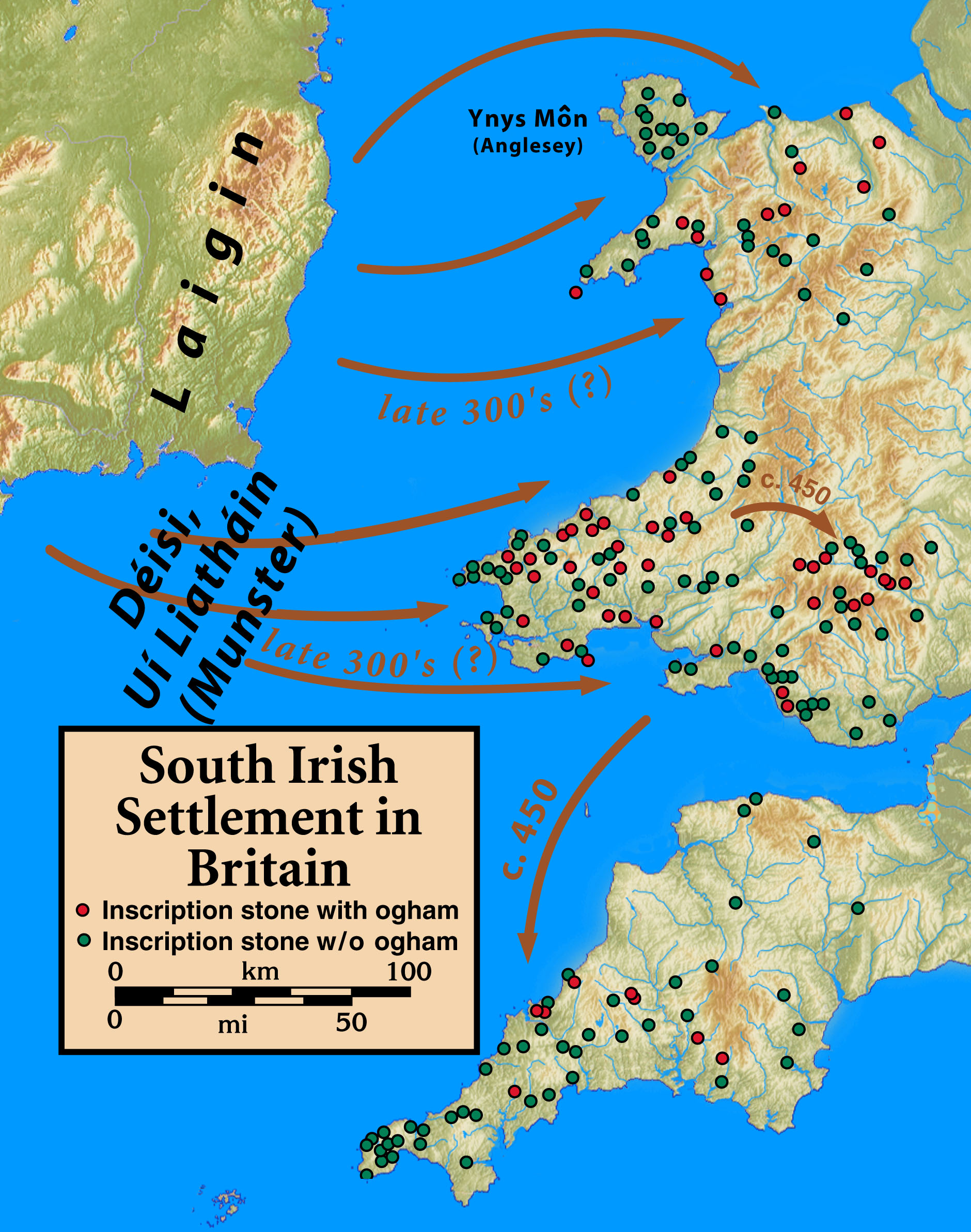

After the end of Roman rule in Britain, significant Irish settlement of western Britain took place.

The Déisi are recorded as having founded the Gwynedd (Anglesea) and Dyfed (Pembrokeshire) colonies, with contemporary Ogham inscriptions identifying the genealogies of the colonists, which are later echoed in the 8th century Old Irish work, The Expulsion of the Déisi.

Similarly, the traditional view is that Gaelic language and culture was brought to Scotland, probably in the 4th century, by settlers from Ireland, who founded the Gaelic kingdom of Dál Riata on Scotland's west coast. This is based mostly on medieval writings from the 9th and 10th centuries. Due to the growth of Dál Riata, in both size and influence, Scotland became almost wholly Gaelic-speaking. However, in the Lowlands – which had been the northernmost part of the Kingdom of Northumbria, the Northumbrian language remained dominant, and formed the basis of the Scots language. While Scots gradually became more and more widespread, Gaelic remained the dominant language of the Highlands into the 19th century.

Before and during the Gregorian mission of 596 AD, Irish Christians such as Columba (521–97), Buriana, Diuma, Ceollach, Saint Machar, Saint Cathan, Saint Blane, Jaruman, Wyllow, Kessog, St Govan, Donnán of Eigg, Foillan and Saint Fursey began the conversion of the English and Pictish peoples. Modwenna and others were significant in the following century.

Some English monarchs, such as Oswiu of Northumbria (c. 612 – 15 February 670), Aldfrith (died 704 or 705) and Harold Godwinson (died 1066) were either raised in or sought refuge in Ireland, as did Welsh rulers such as Gruffudd ap Cynan. Alfred the Great may have spent some of his childhood in Ireland.

In the year 902 Norsemen who had been forced out of Ireland were given permission by the English to settle in Wirral, in the north west of England. An Irish historical record known as "The Three Fragments" refers to a distinct group of settlers living among these Vikings as "Irishmen". Further evidence of this Irish migration to Wirral comes from the name of the village of Irby in Wirral, which means "settlement of the Irish", and St Bridget's church, which is known to have been founded by "Vikings from Ireland". The Irish of the 10th century may have settled as far afield as Northumbria and Lincolnshire, as place names such as Irby upon Humber, Ireleth and Irton mention the Irish as an ethnic group, while Goidelic personal names appear in some northern English place-names, including Duggleby, Fixby and Melmerby, and in a Viking-age Runic inscription from County Durham.

The island of Ireland was itself claimed as an Ecclesiastical fief, via the forged, mid 8th century, Donation of Constantine, with the feudal Lordship of Ireland later leased to Henry II of England and his heirs, by Pope Alexander III's, 1171 grant, resulting in the presence and settlement of Irish traders and seamen in English and Welsh ports, as well as the establishment of The Pale, on the island, the Irish settlers being subject to a poll tax, from 1440; in 1542, Henry VIII, following his excommunication, would have the Irish Parliament create the Kingdom, with himself elected as King. Subsequently, through offering English titles, and ecclesiastical lands, in a surrender and regrant process, would offer Irish clan chiefs, property and political power, in England, as well as Ireland. In 1555, Pope Paul IV, would confirm the existence of the Irish Kingdom, and that it was to be held in personal union with the Kingdom of England, via a Papal bull. A personal Union that would later include the Kingdom of Scotland, and between 1707 and 1800, the politically united Kingdom of Great Britain. The Irish Parliament and Kingdom would be politically united with Great Britain as the United Kingdom of Great Britain and Ireland, between 1801 and 1922, through the Acts of Union 1800. Today, Ireland is divided between the independent Republic of Ireland and Northern Ireland, a constituent of the United Kingdom.

Irish people who made Britain their home in the later medieval era included Aoife MacMurrough, Princess of Leinster (1145–88), the poet Muireadhach Albanach (fl. 1213), the lawyer William of Drogheada (died 1245), Máel Muire Ó Lachtáin (died 1249), Malachias Hibernicus (fl. 1279–1300), Gilbert Ó Tigernaig (died 1323), Diarmait MacCairbre (executed 1490) and Germyn Lynch (fl. 1441–1483), all of whom made successful lives in the various kingdoms of Britain.

=== 16th to 18th centuries ===
Historically, Irish immigrants to the United Kingdom in the eighteenth and nineteenth centuries were considered over-represented amongst those appearing in court. However, research suggests that policing strategy may have put immigrants at a disadvantage by targeting only the most public forms of crime, while locals were more likely able to engage in the types of crimes that could be conducted behind locked doors. An analysis of historical courtroom records suggests that despite higher rates of arrest, immigrants were not systematically disadvantaged by the British court system in the eighteenth and nineteenth centuries.

Some notable people born in Ireland who settled in Great Britain between the 16th and 19th centuries:

- Richard Burke, 4th Earl of Clanricarde, died 1635
- Robert Boyle, FRS, died 1691
- Laetitia Pilkington, died 1750
- Richard Brinsley Sheridan
- George Monro (British Army officer), 1700–57
- Patrick Brontë, 1777–1861
- Arthur Wellesley, 1st Duke of Wellington
- Thomas Moore, died 1852
- Bram Stoker, author of Dracula
- Oliver Goldsmith, author of The Deserted Village
- Edmund Burke, politician, reformer, writer
- Mary Burns
- Robert Tressell, author of The Ragged Trousered Philanthropists

=== 19th century ===
The most significant exodus followed the worst of a series of potato crop failures in the 1840s – the Great Irish Famine. It is estimated that more than one million people died and almost the same again emigrated. A further wave of emigration to England also took place between the 1930s and 1960s by Irish escaping poor economic conditions following the establishment of the Irish Free State. This was furthered by the severe labour shortage in Britain during the mid-20th century, which depended largely on Irish immigrants to work in the areas of construction and domestic labour. The extent of the Irish contribution to Britain's construction industry in the 20th century may be gauged from Sir William MacAlpine's 1998 assertion that the contribution of the Irish to the success of his industry had been "immeasurable". This statement by a member of the British upper class illustrates how Irish migrant labour was regularly employed to discipline and weaken organised English labour unions at the same time as disparaging the contribution of the latter to the development of their own nation. Of this process the German-born philosopher Karl Marx wrote in 1870:

"Ireland constantly sends her own surplus to the English labour market, and thus forces down wages and lowers the material and moral position of the English working class... This antagonism is the secret of the impotence of the English working class, despite its organisation. It is the secret by which the capitalist class maintains its power. And the latter is quite aware of this."

Ireland's population fell from more than 8 million to just 6.5 million between 1841 and 1851. A century later it had dropped to 4.3 million. By the late 19th century, emigration was heaviest from Ireland's most rural southern and western counties. Cork, Kerry, Galway, Mayo, Sligo, Tipperary and Limerick alone provided nearly half of Ireland's emigrants. Some of this movement was temporary, made up of seasonal harvest labourers working in Britain and returning home for winter and spring.

Some notable people born in Ireland who settled in Great Britain in the 19th century:

- Michael William Balfe (1808–1870), opera composer
- Peter Boyle (1876–1939), footballer and manager
- Edward Ernest Bowen (1836–1901), footballer, cricketer and educator
- Louis Brennan (1852–1932), mechanical engineer who invented the Brennan Torpedo
- Mary Burns (1821–1863), activist and partner of revolutionary socialist Friedrich Engels
- Lawrence Bulger (1870–1928), rugby union player and doctor
- Simon Byrne (1806–1833), bare-knuckle boxer
- Alex Craig (1886–1951), footballer
- John Doherty (1798–1854), trade unionist
- John Henry Foley (1818–1874), sculptor
- Mary Josephine Hannan (1865–1935), first female medical doctor in Wales
- Mary Jane Kelly (1863–1888), suspected final victim of Jack the Ripper
- Arthur Leared (1822–1879), physician
- John McKenna (1855–1936), athlete, businessman and first manager of Liverpool F.C.
- Daniel Maclise (1806–1870), painter
- The Manchester Martyrs (died 1867), Irish republicans William Philip Allen, Michael Larkin, and Michael O'Brien hanged in Manchester
- James Mullin (1846–1920), medical doctor, journalist and Irish republican activist
- James Bronterre O'Brien (1804–1864), Chartist leader, activist and journalist
- Tim O'Brien (1861–1948), baronet and cricketer
- T. P. O'Connor (1848–1929), Irish nationalist Member of Parliament for Liverpool Scotland
- Bram Stoker (1847–1912), theatre manager
- Whitley Stokes (1830–1909), lawyer and Celtic scholar
- Oscar Wilde (1854–1900), playwright, novelist and poet

=== 20th to 21st centuries ===
By the mid-1930s, Great Britain was the choice of many who had to leave Ireland. Britain's wartime economy (1939–45) and post-war boom attracted many Irish people to expanding cities and towns such as London, Liverpool, Manchester, Birmingham, Glasgow and Luton. Prior to the 2000s financial crisis, ongoing sectarian violence and its economic aftermath was another major factor for immigration.

According to the UK 2001 Census, white Irish-born residents make up 1.2% of those living in England and Wales. In 1997, the Irish Government in its White Paper on Foreign Policy claimed that there were around two million Irish citizens living in Britain. The 2001 Census also showed that Irish people are more likely to be employed in managerial or professional occupations than those classed as "White British".

As a result of the Irish financial crisis, emigration from Ireland rose significantly. Data published in June 2011 showed that Irish emigration to Britain had risen by 25 per cent to 13,920 in 2010.

Some notable people born in Ireland who settled in Great Britain starting in the 20th century and into the 21st century include:

==== Irish broadcasters ====
BBC broadcaster Sir Terry Wogan moved to Buckinghamshire, England in 1969, acquiring British citizenship and a knighthood in 2005, and remained resident in the UK until his death in 2016. Comedians Ed Byrne and Dara Ó Briain have relocated to Britain from Ireland, and regularly feature on British television.

==== Black and Asian communities ====
Since the 1970s some UK organisations, sections of media, and government departments have defined Black, Asian and minority ethnic (BAME) in anti-racist efforts and general demography. There are several notable Irish migrants to Great Britain who are people of colour, or who might otherwise be considered part of BAME communities. This includes emigrants from Ireland from the black Irish community, as well as Asian Irish people.

Irish musician and singer Phil Lynott settled in Surrey, England after the commercial success of his Dublin-formed band Thin Lizzy. Lynott, who died in 1986, was mixed raced and had British Guianan ancestry. Irish actor Christopher Simpson was moved to London, England as child in 1981. Simpson is of Irish and Rwandan descent.

Irish footballer Darren Randolph, who has spoken of his experiences growing up black in Ireland, moved to Britain permanently after joining London team Charlton Athletic F.C. in 2003, and has since remained in English football. Model and actress Layla Flaherty relocated to Liverpool, England in 2006. Flaherty, who has Irish and African American heritage, has appeared in UK-based E4 productions, such as Desperate Scousewives. Also relocating to England in 2006, Ethiopian-Irish actress Ruth Negga has appeared in films, as well as RTÉ and BBC series. In 2018, Negga, who has been Academy Award-nominated, was featured in the Evening Standard's Progress 1000 list, which claims to chart the careers of London's most influential people. Irish presenter Liz Bonnin has also relocated to London. Bonnin, who has Indian, Portuguese, and French-Martiniquan heritage moved to Britain after establishing a science-based broadcasting career with the BBC since 2009.

In 2020, Irish women's football player Rianna Jarrett relocated to Brighton, England. Jarrett, whose father is Jamaican, made the move to Britain after joining Brighton & Hove Albion W.F.C.

==== Irish footballers ====
Notable Irish footballers, who were born or raised in Ireland, began moving as young adults to teams based in Great Britain since the post-World War II period. As the sport became more commercially successful, wealthy English clubs in particular pursued Irish talent, which was often seen as detrimental to the game's development in Ireland.

Moving from Northern Ireland between 1949 and 1963, players such as Danny Blanchflower, Jimmy McIlroy, Billy Bingham, Terry Neill, George Best, Pat Jennings and later, migrating between 1971 and 1981; Sammy McIlroy, Mal Donaghy, Norman Whiteside, David McCreery, Nigel Worthington, Jimmy Nicholl and Martin O'Neill won titles as players, or managers, in England and Scotland's top competitions.

Moving to Britain from the Republic of Ireland during the 1950s and 60s, Everton players Tommy Eglington, Mick Meagan, Peter Corr, Tommy Clinton, Don Donovan, George Cummins; Manchester United players Tony Dunne, Noel Cantwell, Johnny Giles, and later, in the 1970s and 80s, Liam Brady, Packie Bonner, Ronnie Whelan, Frank Stapleton, David O'Leary and Steve Staunton all won major honours in the Scottish or English top-flights.

In the late 20th and early 21st centuries, players also from the Republic, such as John O'Shea, Stephen Carr, Steve Finnan, Denis Irwin, Niall Quinn, Roy Keane, Shay Given, Robbie Keane and Damien Duff, moved to enjoy decades-long careers in English and Scottish football, each winning at least one top-flight competition. In the same era, players who moved from Northern Ireland to Britain, winning competitions in the Scottish and English top-tiers, included Steven Davis, David Healy, Jonny Evans, Keith Gillespie, Roy Carroll, Gerry Taggart, Kyle Lafferty and Neil Lennon.

== Types of migration ==
=== Seasonal workers ===
Prior to the 19th century, much of Irish migration of the modern period had been large-scale movement of temporary labourers to Britain. These seasonal workers or labourers, known as Spalpeens and Tatie Hookers, were often based on extended family ties, and would involve up to half a year working on farms or in agricultural industry. Up until as late as the 1970s, earnings from this type of employment helped sustain communities in Western Ireland.

=== Great Famine refugees ===
The Great Famine in 1845 triggered a mass exodus from Ireland, with significant numbers of Irish migrants fleeing to Britain to escape severe poverty and starvation.

== Regional migration histories ==
=== Irish in England ===
In 2021, there were 505,212 people in England (0.9 per cent of the population), who had been born in Ireland, down from 674,786 in 2001. Of these, 314,674 were born in the Republic of Ireland, and 190,538 born in Northern Ireland. Despite the drop since 2001, this is still the greatest concentration of Irish-born—as distinct from persons of Irish ancestry—abroad anywhere in the world and was equivalent to 7.2% of the population of the island of Ireland (7.1 million) in 2021, or 6.1% of the Republic of Ireland population and 10% of the Northern Irish population.

==== Barrow-in-Furness ====
During the Great Famine of the 19th century, Barrow-in-Furness was seen as a desirable location that many Irish migrated to. This was in part due to ease of access to reach the town's port from Ireland (particularly from Ulster), and secondly because it was a booming town as a result of the Industrial Revolution with guaranteed work, particularly in the emerging steelworks and shipbuilding industries in the town. The Irish-born population of Barrow exceeded 5,000 at the time of the 1881 census (about 10% of the town's population). As a result of this, to this day a prominent portion of Barrow's population are of Irish descent.

==== Birmingham ====
Birmingham has a large Irish community, dating back to the Industrial Revolution, it is estimated that Birmingham has the largest Irish population per capita in Britain. Digbeth is the traditional Irish area in Birmingham. During the 1950s Sparkhill, Sparkbrook, Aston, and Nechells were the main Irish areas. Today many Irish people live in areas such as Hall Green and Erdington. Birmingham has the UK's largest St Patricks Day's Parade (and the world's third biggest) and Britain's only Irish Quarter, with many traditional Irish pubs and the Birmingham Irish centre. Irish people have always moved to Birmingham for work especially for the construction, factory and industrial work which the city had to offer. Many Irish people moved to Birmingham to build canals, roads and railways in the city's industrial past. St Chad's Cathedral is one of only two of the minor Basilicas in the UK. It is very important as the first Catholic church built in Britain after the English Reformation, and was designed by the architect Augustus Pugin.

Community relations for the Irish in Birmingham were complicated by the pub bombings of November 1974. At inquests into the deaths of the 21 victims, "Witness O" named the men responsible as Seamus McLoughlin, Mick Murray, Michael Hayes and James Gavin. He said he had been given permission to reveal the names by the current head of the IRA in Dublin. There were very limited physical attacks on Irish people in the aftermath of the bombings. In November 2018, Birmingham's Irish Association revealed a memorial to those killed outside Birmingham New Street Station.

==== Bolton ====
A large number settled here in the 1950s as work was scarce at home, especially in the South. Many found work in the mills and factories and encouraged other family members to come over as there were jobs waiting for them.

==== Bradford ====
Bradford largely expanded into the city it is today during the 19th century, due to jobs in the newly built textile mills attracting many immigrants in dire need of work. The population increase, in fact, saw Bradford go from a small town of 6,000 in 1801, to 103,000 by 1851 according to records taken. Many of these newly arriving people were Irish escaping the Great Famine, and could easily take advantage of all the work Bradford had on offer due to the ease to reach there from Ireland. J. B. Hammond once commented on this, saying of the distance from Ireland to Yorkshire, "It was easier to reach Yorkshire from Ireland than from Norfolk or Dorset... Labourers who were sent to Lancashire were taken to London, put on a boat of Pickfords...carried to Manchester in four or five days at a cost of fourteen shillings. But an Irishman could cross to Liverpool in fourteen hours for two shillings and sixpence". In 1851, records showed that Bradford had the highest proportion of Irish-born people in Yorkshire at the time. In Donald M. MacRaid's book Irish Migration in Modern Britain, he comments on research showing that a large number of Bradford's Irish originally came from County Mayo, County Sligo, County Dublin, and County Laois, with records also suggesting that there was a common migration trail at the time from County Roscommon to Bradford. Many of the Irish from Mayo and Sligo originated from a rural background, and at first struggled to adapt to urban life in Bradford. To this day, many residents of Bradford and the surrounding area are of Irish descent.

There was an Irish Diaspora Research Unit at the University of Bradford in the early 21st Century under Dr. Patrick O'Sullivan, but the Unit did not continue after he moved to New York University.

==== Braintree, Essex ====
In the 1950s many thousands of Irish migrated to Braintree in Essex to meet the demands of the labour shortage primarily in the Courtauld's textile mills, both in Braintree and nearby Halstead. They also helped meet the need for labour both in Critall's main Braintree factory.

==== Coventry ====
Coventry had a large influx of Irish from around the middle of the 20th century, when the city's motor industry was booming. To this day, Coventry remains one of the cities in the UK with a higher Irish population, and retains strong Irish links. The city council put the town's Irish population at 2.3% in 2009, higher than the UK national average of 1%, and additionally the Coventry Irish Society estimated that around 10% of the city's population are of Irish descent.

==== Gateshead ====
During the 19th century, many of the towns in County Durham (the county Gateshead historically belongs to), which before that point had mostly been a rural county, began to take advantage of emerging new technology and discovered resources in the wake of the Industrial Revolution. This not only changed the face of the county, urbanizing much of it, but also led to expansion on a massive scale. People from all over the United Kingdom, ranging from the south of England to Ireland, moved to the area to take advantage of the large amount of work that these industries brought in roles such as coal mining and shipbuilding. As in many other instances around this time, it was the Great Famine which caused many from Ireland in particular to be drawn to jobs in the County Durham area, and make the move. A further advantage was that the county was quite straightforward to reach from Ireland, due to easy access by rail to there from the western port of Whitehaven, itself easily accessible by ferry from Ireland itself (in particular, Ulster). Gateshead in particular was one of the towns that changed most significantly due to the events of Industrial Revolution, but moreover took in one of the largest numbers of Irish of all the County Durham towns. In 1871, the town was recorded as having the densest number of Irish-born in County Durham, at 6.7%, and a year later it was recorded that 1 in 4 people in the town were Irish. The town also went through a huge population increase, rising by approximately 100,000 people over the course of the 19th century which the Irish undeniably contributed to. To this day, many people in the town are of Irish descent.

==== Halifax ====
Similarly to Bradford, Halifax was a desirable location for Irish escaping the Great Famine due to ease of access to reach, and the fact that its growth into an industrial boomtown over the 19th century coincided with the time of the famine. Many of the jobs on offer in Halifax were in newly opened cotton spinning mills, opened as a result of taking advantage of technological innovation in the then emerging textile industry. There were said to be as many as 24 mills in the town by 1850. The Irish contributed to its population growth from around 9,000 in 1800, to 25,000 by the middle of the century. In 1872, records showed that the Irish numbered "from a sixth to an eighth of the population" in Halifax, with it also being noted that "the political strength of the Irish people in Halifax is considerable". Irish heritage still lives on in Halifax through the likes of the town's football team, Halifax Irish F.C.

==== Heywood ====
As Heywood developed into a mill town during the Industrial Revolution, this brought a large number of new residents to the town, including many Irish escaping the Great Famine. Additionally, many Irish migrants took up jobs in the area working as navvies on the local railway, a fact that still lives on in the town's legacy as some say that these navvies may have been the influence behind Heywood's nickname, Monkey Town.

==== Jarrow ====
Also situated in County Durham, the story behind why many Irish moved to Jarrow is similar to that of Gateshead. Shipbuilding, in particular, drew many of them to Jarrow. The town to this day is still sometimes nicknamed Little Ireland, and has a large Catholic community, as a result of the sheer number of Irish who moved there.

==== Keighley ====
During the Industrial Revolution, Keighley flourished in the textile and weaving industries, which encouraged many Irish fleeing the Great Famine and looking for work to move there. This resulted in a significant Irish community, and to this day the town still has a large number of inhabitants of Irish descent. The Irish redefined aspects of Keighley as a town significantly. It was once commented that the (then fairly new) Irish community in Keighley "contributed more to the Home-Rule than [in] either of the populous towns of Glasgow or Liverpool". The influence of the Irish also led to there being a large Catholic community in Keighley, which has lived on in both Catholic churches and schools that exist in the town today.

==== Leeds ====
Joyce O'Donnell School of Irish Dancing, St Patrick's Day Parade, Leeds

There is an Irish community in Leeds, although it is generally smaller than in other large cities in Britain. The Leeds Irish Centre is on York Road on the east side of the city. The nearby area of East End Park is the area most associated with Leeds's Irish community. In the years after the Famine, 3.3% of Leeds's population was Irish-born. There was a particular concentration of migrants from the Irish county of Mayo. A book on the subject of migration from Ireland to Leeds in the 20th century was published in 2010: Taking The Boat: The Irish in Leeds, 1931-81.

==== Liverpool ====
Liverpool is widely known for having the strongest Irish heritage of any UK city - perhaps alongside Glasgow. This originates from the city's port being close to Ireland, which made it easy to reach for all those escaping the Great Famine between 1845 and 1849. More than 20% of Liverpool's population was Irish by 1851. Up to 2 million Irish people travelled to Liverpool within 10 years during this time, though many subsequently departed for the United States. According to the Museum of Liverpool, is estimated that 75% of Liverpool's population now has some Irish ancestry. It is also twinned with Dublin. All four of Liverpool's most famous natives, the Beatles, had some Irish ancestry: John Lennon's great-grandparents on his father's side were Irish immigrants from County Down, Paul McCartney had an Irish grandfather and great-grandfather, Ringo Starr had an Irish great-grandmother, and George Harrison had Irish blood through his mother.

Liverpool's Irish heritage is further highlighted by it being the only English city to have a significant Orange Order membership, as well as having a large Irish Catholic majority and being the most Catholic city in the UK. It remains the only UK city to elect—and continuously re-elect—an Irish nationalist politician (T. P. O'Connor) and hosts one of the UK's largest St Patrick's Day parades. The city has been at odds with right-wing politicians since the 1970s, with a city council that was previously dominated by the right-wing Conservative Party becoming more left-wing, a relationship that was exacerbated further during the days of Prime Minister Margaret Thatcher, whose Conservative government planned to starve the area of resources. It has also been regarded as a notably European city, and often identifies more with Ireland and the European Union than the UK; this intensified in the 1980s during the UK media's mishandling of the Hillsborough disaster, which saw lies being spread about dead Liverpudlians by tabloids such as The Sun, and it is not uncommon to hear a Liverpudlian refer to themselves as "Scouse, not English". Pro-EU sentiment increased again in 2008, when the EU designated Liverpool as a "Capital of Culture" and helped it to regenerate by pouring over €1 billion into the economy while the Conservative UK government continued to cut its funding. The Irish have also come to be a staple of Liverpool's surrounding areas; places such as Birkenhead, Bootle, Crosby, Halewood, Huyton, Kirkby, Litherland, Runcorn, St Helens and Wallasey have many ethnically Irish residents and have also inherited the Liverpool accent.

Between Liverpool FC and Everton FC, the city's two biggest football teams, Everton FC is often cited as the more Irish of the two.

==== London Irish ====
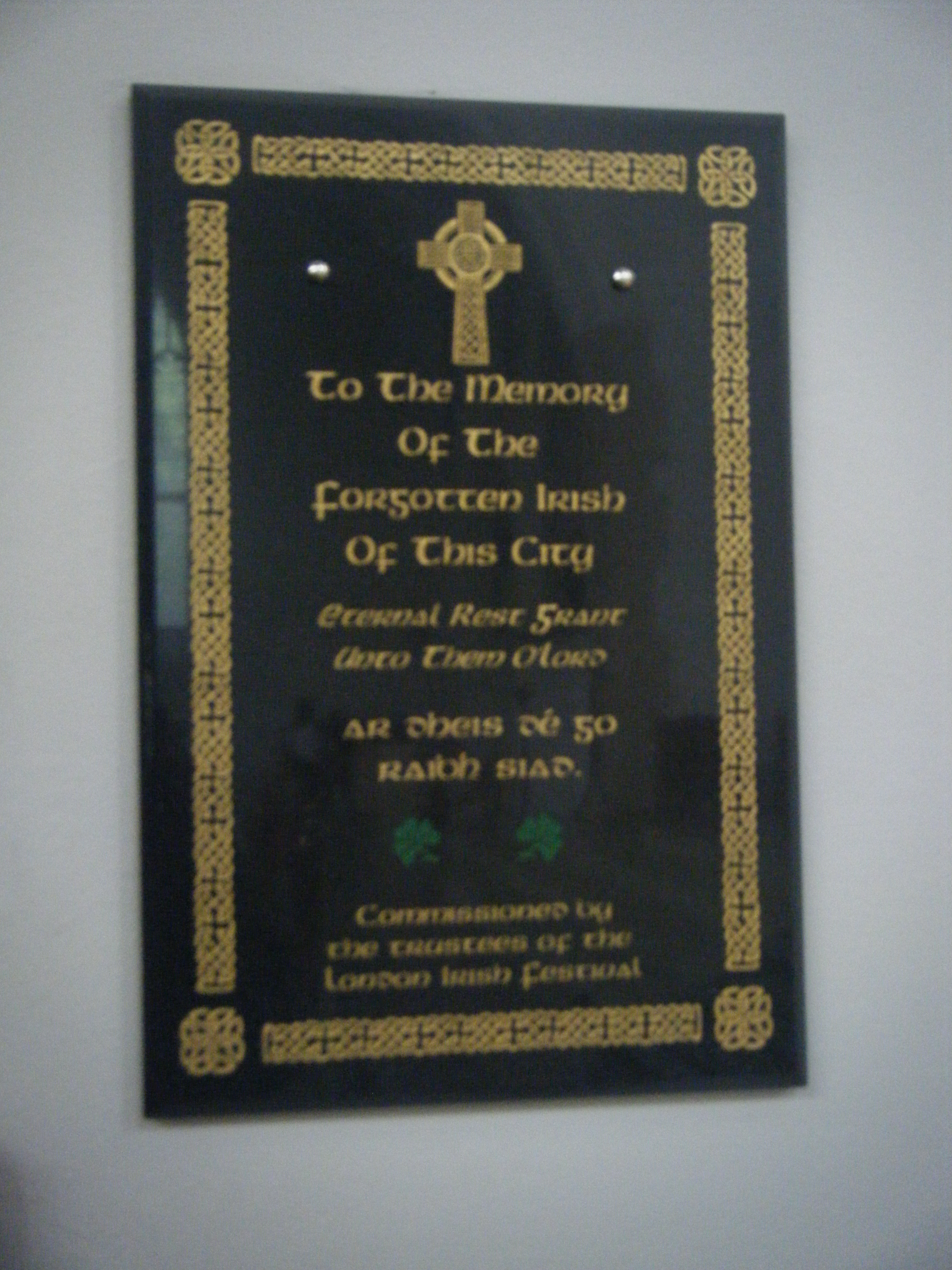
Memorial to the "Forgotten Irish" of London, Church of the Sacred Heart, Kilburn.

The term "London Irish" relates to people born in London of Irish descent. London has Great Britain's biggest Irish population and there was a particularly big community in the (affectionately known) "County Kilburn" area of northwest London. With urban gentrification and higher housing costs, many of London's working-class Irish-Catholic community have moved further out from Kilburn to Cricklewood.

Another large Irish community was in the Archway area, where many Irish navvies came to work in building railways and roads from the 1830s onwards. The community grew larger throughout the Famine years and then again after the Second World War when the Whittington Hospital in Archway recruited nurses from Ireland. This area became associated with Irish political activism with the election of Michael O'Halloran as MP for Islington North in 1969. O'Halloran referred to his supporters as "the Irish mafia". In 2017, a new public space outside Archway underground station was named Navigator Square after the Irish navvies.

The Camden Town area of London, as well as Shepherd's Bush, were also known for their large Irish communities. The Irish Cultural Centre is located in Hammersmith, West London. Greenford in the London Borough of Ealing is home to a large Irish community and contains Tir Chonaill Park, home to the Tír Chonaill Gaels Gaelic Football club.

==== Manchester ====
Manchester has strong and long established Irish connections. The earliest large influx of migrants arrived sometime around 1798 according to Peter Ewart, a Manchester cotton manufacturer. It has been estimated that around 35% of Manchester's current population has Irish ancestry, although no reliable data exists to evidence this. In November 2012 whilst addressing an audience at the University of Manchester, Michael D. Higgins suggested "the Irish connection in Manchester is no less evident than in Liverpool. And where Liverpool was a gateway for so many Irish people, Manchester tended to be for many the end of the journey, a home".

When Manchester's population grew in the early 1800s due to it becoming the World's first industrial city the Irish born in Manchester were said to represent over 15% of the population. The Irish were said to have lived in terrible conditions and were described by Friedrich Engels in his 1845 book The Condition of the Working Class in England. Areas concentrated with high levels of Irish were known as Little Ireland around Oxford Road and later Ancoats and Hulme. Manchester was a breeding ground for Irish Republicanism, supporters known as Fenians, and when three Irish men were hanged accused of murder they became figureheads for Irish nationalism in Britain, Ireland and America and were known as the Manchester Martyrs. The reports of these terrible conditions sparked pioneering social changes in Manchester in the 1840s with the city often at the forefront of social reform in Britain.

Manchester was targeted by the IRA in the 1996 Manchester bombing in what was described as the biggest bomb on British soil since World War II. Manchester was targeted in part because security in London was so rigid due to parades in London for the Queen's Trooping of the Colour. However, journalist Jennifer Williams argues that it was telling that the terrorists warned of the exact location beforehand to save human lives in a city with a rich history of Irish migration, balancing a fine line of shocking Britain and alienating supporters back home. On 20 June 1996, the IRA claimed responsibility for the bombing, and stated that it "sincerely regretted" causing injury to civilians. This stood in sharp contrast to their earlier 1993 bombing of nearby Warrington which killed two English children aged 3 and 12, which the IRA blamed on "the British authorities" for not being able to respond to its imprecise warning that did not even specify Warrington as the target.

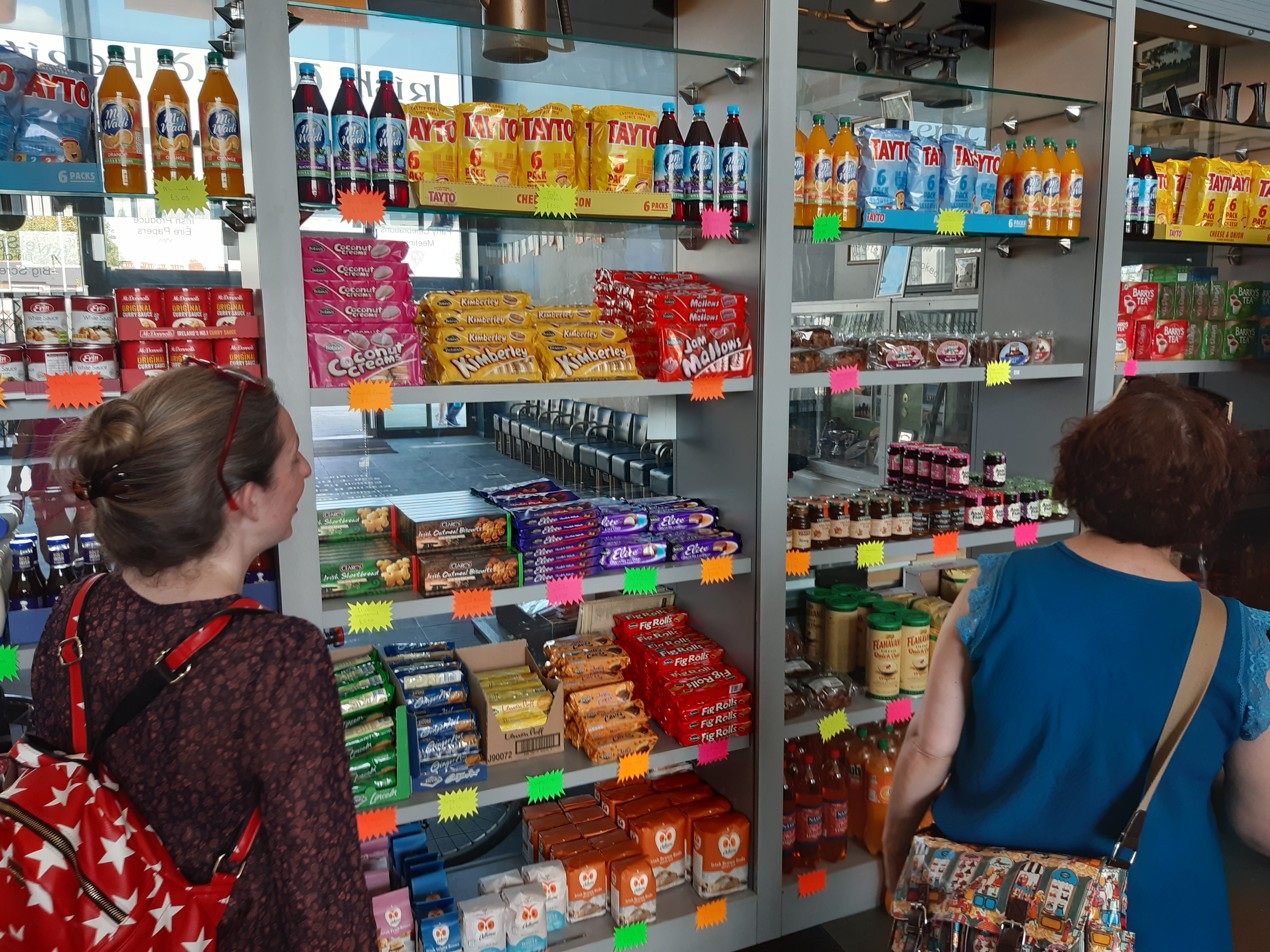
Irish visitors to Manchester peruse Irish products for sale at the Irish World Heritage Centre, Cheetham Hill.

The city's residents of Irish heritage have been influential in the music industry. All four members of the Smiths had Irish roots, as do the Gallagher brothers, and all the original members of the band Oasis. Gary Mounfield (Mani), bass player of the Stone Roses had an Irish mother. Manchester holds an annual Irish Festival each March, including one of the UK's largest St Patrick's Day parades. Cheetham is home to the Irish World Heritage Centre.

Due to its connections with the local Irish Catholic population, Manchester United was almost named Manchester Celtic in 1902 and is the most supported football club in Ireland.

==== Middlesbrough ====
Middlesbrough during the latter half of the 19th century had the second highest percentage of Irish born migrants in England after Liverpool. In terms of the overall population, 15.6% of Middlesbrough's inhabitants were Irish born in 1861 and 1 in 5 adults (9.2%) were Irish born in the 1871 census. During the late 19th century, Middlesbrough became a world leader in the Steel and Iron industry and with the rapid growth of the town, the expanse of newly opened blast furnaces attracted many workers and their families to the Middlesbrough area. Unlike many other towns in England at the time, Middlesbrough showed no signs of sectarianism or segregation within the various communities that lived alongside each other, there were no "Irish quarters" and the many Irish that settled in Middlesbrough integrated into their adopted home. This was most likely as a result of the town's infancy, it was essentially a migrant town. Although the number of Irish born currently residing in Middlesbrough may not be as substantial as it once was, Middlesbrough retains a strong Irish connection and heritage through the ancestry of many residents.

==== Sunderland ====
Sunderland was another place in County Durham that many Irish escaping the famine saw as desirable. Once dubbed "the largest shipbuilding town in the world", the city largely expanded into what it is today as a result of the number of people this work, and the demand for manual labour in other local jobs such as coal mining and chemical works, encouraged to move there. The Irish were one of the most significant groups who took advantage of the demand for labour and moved there, and consequently many people in Sunderland today have Irish heritage.

Peter O'Toole's father was a labourer in Sunderland for many years, which is why Peter O'Toole supported Sunderland A.F.C.

The city also celebrates St. Patrick's Day.

==== Whitehaven ====
Due to its port and close proximity to Ireland, similarly to Liverpool, Whitehaven was an easy way of accessing England for the Irish, especially when escaping the Great Famine of the 19th century. Thousands passed through the town to move on to work for themselves elsewhere in England, such as the aforementioned County Durham, however many also stayed in the area and many people in the town still have Irish heritage today.

==== Widnes ====
Widnes became a boom town during the Industrial Revolution, having a successful chemical industry brought on by a factory opened in the town in 1847, which led to many Irish workers (among others from Wales, Poland and Lithuania) moving there for work. Further making Widnes advantageous for the Irish to move to was its close proximity to Liverpool. Since then, a large number of overspill from the neighbouring city of Liverpool have brought many more people of Irish descent to Widnes too, particularly in areas at the west end of the town such as Ditton and Hough Green, where overspill are still moved.

==== Wigan ====
Wigan, being almost equal distance from Liverpool and Manchester received high immigration rates of Irish people in the 1800s. The Wigan districts population doubled from 60,000 in 1841 to 120,000 in 1871 with the immigration of Irish to the town the biggest factor. The Irish mainly settled in the central areas of the town such as Scholes and Ince with the area around Belle Green Lane referred to as Irishtown. St Patrick's church in Scholes was built in 1847 on the back of huge swathes of Irish immigration.

The local amateur rugby league club Wigan St Patricks has the Irish shamrock on the club badge with green and black being the club colours.

The Wigan accent has even been affected by the great number of Irish coming to the town. The local word "moidered", known elsewhere as "mithered", is said to have derived from pronouncing the word mithered in an Irish accent.

==== Wolverhampton ====
Wolverhampton prospered during the Industrial Revolution, particularly having successful iron and locomotive industries, which attracted many Irish escaping the Great Famine. As well as this, Wolverhampton had a longstanding Roman Catholic community from as early as the 18th century, leading to the city sometimes being nicknamed "Little Rome", which began to attract Irish to the city from an early stage.

=== Irish in Scotland ===
There are long standing migration links between Scotland and the province of Ulster, especially between County Donegal, County Antrim and County Down with the west coast of Scotland. Considering the Dal Riada kingdoms and the gaelicisation of Scotland in the early Middle Ages, it is difficult to determine how many Scots have genetic ancestry from Ireland historically or how many were Picts who adopted Irish lifestyles, although the general consensus is that both happened as Pictish culture vanished by the 11th century. In 2001, around 55,000 people in Scotland (1.1 per cent of the Scottish population) had been born in Ireland, while people of Irish (either Protestant or Catholic) ancestry make up 20% of the Scottish population. Scotland has a greater number of persons born in Northern Ireland and County Donegal (0.66 per cent) than people who were born in the rest of Ireland (0.43%). Despite having lower than average numbers of Irish people resident, the Lanarkshire town of Coatbridge is more than 50% Catholic. The town is populated by the second, third, fourth, fifth and sixth generation children of Irish immigrants, especially immigrants from County Donegal. In 2006 more than 28% of adults in Coatbridge had surnames with Irish origins. Coatbridge holds the largest St. Patrick's Day Festival in Scotland.

Famous Scots of Irish-Catholic ancestry include actors Sean Connery, Brian Cox and Gerard Butler; comedians Billy Connolly and Frankie Boyle; singers Susan Boyle, Gerry Rafferty, Fran Healy and David Byrne; historians Tom Devine and Michael Lynch; footballers like Jimmy McGrory and Ray Houghton; politicians like James Connolly (the trade unionist and Easter Rising leader), Jim Murphy (former British Shadow Defence Secretary), and socialist political figure Tommy Sheridan; television presenter Lorraine Kelly; businessmen like Thomas Lipton; and writers Arthur Conan Doyle, A. J. Cronin, John Byrne and Andrew O'Hagan.

Support for particular football teams often reflects Catholic or Protestant heritage. Celtic are overwhelmingly, though not exclusively, supported by people from a Catholic background. Hibernian and Dundee United were formed as clubs representing Irish Catholics, however there is little vestige of these founding values today. Teams such as Dundee (though founded before Dundee United on entirely secular grounds), Heart of Midlothian and Lanarkshire teams such as Motherwell and Airdrie are contentiously perceived by some as Protestant clubs. Rangers are seen as having retained a Protestant identity, despite signing a number of Catholic players since the 1980s.

Today a very small minority of the Irish Catholic community in Scotland take part in Irish republican marches (mainly in Strathclyde), though these marches do not have exclusively Catholics in attendance, with many Protestants and others of various faiths or none involved, and the Orange Order has a large membership in Scotland, predominantly in Glasgow, Lanarkshire and Ayrshire. As well as Scotland's own parades, many Scottish bands parade in Ulster (chiefly in Northern Ireland and County Donegal) on or around 12 July.

=== Irish in Wales ===
Starting in the 4th century AD, Irish raiders settled Wales extensively, their impact being so great that many Irish words were introduced into the Welsh language. Many Irish emigrants came to Wales as a result of the famine of 1845–52. They were often very poor, and seen as carrying "famine fever" (typhus), but over time they acquired a notable presence—in the thousands, particularly in the Welsh coal mining towns in and around Swansea and Newport.

One of the most famous Welsh nationals of Irish-Catholic ancestry is screen actress Catherine Zeta-Jones.

The Irish language is taught at all levels in the Department of Welsh and Celtic Studies in Aberystwyth University in West Wales, and scholarships offered to students to do intensive summer language courses in Ireland.

== Cultural impact ==
=== Catholic Church ===
The large-scale migration of Irish people to Britain in the 19th century contributed to the reemergence of the Catholic Church in England, which ultimately accelerated tolerance for freedom of religion in the United Kingdom. Observed by the Catholic Church, Saint Patrick's Day is widely celebrated throughout Great Britain, owing to many British people's ancestral links with Ireland as well as the general popularity of the event. Birmingham, Liverpool, and Manchester have particularly large parades.

=== Irish language ===
The Irish language has a long history in Britain. Gaels came to Britain between the 4th to 5th centuries and established Irish speaking communities in the west coast of Scotland that remain to this day. The waves of immigrants from Ireland that settled in British communities in the 19th century included speakers of Irish but English became the norm. However, there are regular gatherings of Irish speakers in London, Glasgow and Manchester and lessons available all over Britain including Glasgow, Milton Keynes, Manchester, Brighton, Lewisham, Hammersmith, Camden, Birmingham, Liverpool, Leeds, Newcastle and Cardiff. While several British universities offer a one-term-long introduction to the Irish language, the Department of Welsh and Celtic Studies in Aberystwyth University in west Wales is the only university to teach the modern Irish language at all levels. Modules in Old, Middle and Early-Modern Irish are also offered, and students can receive scholarships to do intensive summer courses in Ireland.

==== Access to services in the language ====
The lack of provision for legal and citizenship services in the Irish language, including for the Life in the United Kingdom test, has been met with criticism from the Committee of Experts of the European Charter for Regional or Minority Languages, of which the UK has ratified for the Cornish language, the Irish language, Manx Gaelic, the Scots & Ulster Scots dialects, Scottish Gaelic and the Welsh language. In a 2014 report detailing the application of the charter in the UK, the committee were given no justification for the inequality in the treatment of Irish speakers in contrast to that of English, Scottish Gaelic and Welsh speakers, and said that efforts to rectify the inequality were non-existent.

=== Sport ===
Sports teams with links to the Irish community exist in England, although this is not as marked as in Scotland.

=== Football ===
In football, Aston Villa, Arsenal, Everton, Manchester United have a tradition of representing the Irish communities in their area although unlike many clubs in Scotland they were not formed on the basis of representing the Irish community. For example, Arsenal has featured ethnically Irish players such as Liam Brady, Terry Neill, Pat Rice, Niall Quinn, David O'Leary and Graham Barrett. Aston Villa has featured many Irish players such as Steve Staunton, Paul McGrath, Richard Dunne and former managers David O'Leary and Martin O'Neill. Aston Villa has a large Irish following in the West Midlands which has the highest proportion of Irish people in England. Both Everton and Liverpool have roots in a Methodist church but Everton F.C. was often described as Liverpool's Irish Catholic team. Liverpool F.C. was formed by a prominent Orangeman but this fact did not deter Liverpool people from a Catholic background supporting the team. Everton has notably produced Wayne Rooney who is of Irish descent and have recently featured promising Irish international Séamus Coleman; as were prominent Liverpool players who were Everton fans in their youth such as Jamie Carragher and Steve McManaman.

Under the management of Sir Matt Busby, Manchester United also emerged as a club with a considerable Irish following both in Great Britain and in Ireland itself, as well as having notable Irish stars like George Best, Norman Whiteside, Mal Donaghy, Denis Irwin, Roy Keane, and recently John O'Shea.

==== Rugby ====
In rugby league, Dewsbury Celtic represented the large Irish community in Dewsbury, and St. Helens represent communities on Merseyside. Wigan St Patricks amateur rugby league club is borne out of the St Patricks Catholic Church in Scholes, Wigan, that was built in 1847 after huge swathes of Irish moved to the town.

The rugby union club London Irish represents the community in London.

==== Gaelic Games ====
The British GAA is responsible for Gaelic games in Britain. There are seven GAA counties within Britain and a number of hurling, football and camogie clubs operate within each county.

=== Brexit ===
Ever since the Brexit vote in 2016, over 400,000 British persons with ties to Ireland – mainly that of Irish diaspora – applied for an Irish passport as of 2021. This phenomenon further adds on to the growing demand for Irish identity, but is also attributed to rising popularity in European Union citizenship.

== Perceptions of Irish immigration ==
=== Effect on the British trade union movement ===
In 1870, Karl Marx examined how the migration of Irish labour into the British labour market caused significant problems for the nascent English trade union movement since an over-supply of workers enabled employers to lower wages and threaten organised British workers with replacement by Irish migrants. Marx wrote in a letter that "the ordinary English worker hates the Irish worker as a competitor who lowers his standard of life", in addition to noting that "every industrial and commercial centre in England now possesses a working class divided into two hostile camps", consisting of the English and Irish working class.

=== Criminality ===
Perceptions of Irish immigration in Victorian Britain led to negative stereotypes. Settling in large numbers, at a time of unprecedented economic development, Irish people, and especially those living in poverty, were seen as innately criminal by elements of British society. It was even a widespread belief that Irish migrants formed the core of what were described as the "dangerous classes", and represented a threat to law and order. The Vagrancy Act 1824 was, in part, a reaction to significant levels of perceived vagrancy from Irish people "searching for generous local welfare in England".

=== Disease and poverty ===
The results of Irish migration during the 19th century were also perceived as bringing disease and poverty into urban centres, in particular cities such as Manchester, Liverpool and Glasgow.

== Social and health issues ==
=== Health ===
A 2009 study published in Ethnicity & Health demonstrated that the grouping self-reported higher rates of poor general health than the White British populace. This was found to be particularly the case in Northern Ireland, for those who had designated themselves as White, and with an "Irish" national identity. In 2020, a UCL study based in NHS England data, showed that the White Irish group was around 50 per cent less at risk of death from COVID-19 than other black, Asian and minority ethnic (BAME) groups. This was significantly lower than the White British group, which were 12 per cent lower than the average risk for BAME communities.

=== Identity ===
In 2015 research, University of Southampton fellow Dr Rosalind Willis explored the social fragility of the White Irish ethnicity, particularly in England where distinctions between White British and White Irish are, at times, openly denied.

In July 2019, the East Ham constituency Labour branch was criticised for its election of a white Irish woman as the women's officer for its Black, Asian and Minority Ethnic (BAME) forum. The woman in question self-identified as being an ethnic minority and no objections within the branch were raised against her election. Branch secretary, Syed Taqi Shah commented that "if somebody self-declares [as BAME], and the Labour Party allows them to do so, they should be respected."

=== Police discrimination ===
In a 1995 study, sociologist Jock Young found that of 1000 randomly selected residents of Finsbury Park when were asked if they had been stopped by the police over the past year, the White Irish population was disproportionately large with 14.3%, in contrast to 12.8% of Black Caribbean and 5.8% of White British people. The researchers found the Police tactic of "lurking and larking", whereby constables would wait outside Irish pubs and clubs to make arrests to be to blame for the high statistics, which was labelled a form of "institutional racism".

== Census ==
The recorded Irish born residents of Great Britain, with respective populations
Year	Irish born	As percentage of Ireland	As percentage of Great Britain	Great Britain	UK	England	Wales	Scotland	Ireland/Northern Ireland and Ireland (a)
1821				14,091,757	20,893,584	11,281,957	718,279	2,091,521	6,801,827
1831				16,261,183	24,028,584	13,090,615	806,182	2,364,386	7,767,401
1841	419,256	5.1%	2.3%	18,553,124	26,730,929	15,002,250	911,898	2,620,184	8,196,597
1851	727,326	11.1%	3.4%	21,121,967	27,390,629	16,921,972	1,005,637	2,888,742	6,574,278
1861	805,717	13.9%	3.5%	23,085,579	28,927,485	18,954,534	1,111,690	3,062,294	5,798,967
1871	774,310	14.3%	3.0%	26,072,036	31,484,661	21,495,219	1,217,047	3,360,018	5,412,377
1881	781,119	15.1%	2.6%	29,707,207	34,884,848	24,614,001	1,360,438	3,735,573	5,174,836
1891	653,122	13.9%	2.0%	33,015,701	37,732,922	27,483,551	1,518,974	4,025,647	4,704,750
1901	631,629	14.2%	1.7%	36,999,946	41,458,721	30,807,310	1,720,533	4,472,103	4,458,775
1911	550,040	12.6%	1.3%	40,831,000	45,216,665	34,043,076	2,032,193	4,759,445	4,381,951
1921 (b)	523,767	12.1%	1.2%	42,769,226	42,919,700	35,230,225	2,656,504	4,882,497	4,336,468
1931 (b)	505,385	11.8%	1.1%	44,795,357	46,074,000	37,359,045	2,593,332	4,842,980	4,280,932
1951	716,028	16.5%	1.5%	48,854,303	50,271,904	41,159,213	2,596,850	5,096,415	4,331,514
1961	950,978	22.4%	1.9%	51,139,863	52,861,251	43,460,525	2,644,023	5,035,315	4,243,383
1971	957,830	21.2%	1.8%	53,862,908	55,875,903	45,879,670	2,731,204	5,228,963	4,514,313
1981	850,397	17.1%	1.6%	53,556,911	56,395,846	45,731,411	2,790,500	5,035,000	4,986,405
1991	837,464	16.3%	1.6%	53,556,911	57,359,454	47,875,000	2,811,865	5,083,000	5,133,019
2001 (c)	750,355	13.4%	1.3%	57,103,927	59,092,016	49,131,716	2,910,200	5,062,011	5,602,470
2011	681,952	10.7%	1.1%	61,371,315	63,286,362	53,012,456	3,063,456	5,295,403	6,399,115
2021 (d)	582,354	8.3%	0.9%	65,077,200	67,281,039	56,489,800	3,107,500	5,479,900	7,052,314
a) Total population of the island of Ireland, combining Northern Ireland and Republic of Ireland populations after 1921. b) There was no census in Ireland in 1921 or 1931. These are estimates based on an interpolation between 1911 and 1936 (Northern Ireland) and 1911 and 1926 (Republic of Ireland) for 1921, and between 1911 and 1936 (Northern Ireland) and 1926 and 1936 (Republic of Ireland) for 1931 c) Irish census was in 2002. d) Irish and Scottish censuses were in 2022.

=== 2001 Census ===
The 2001 UK census was the first which allowed British citizens to identify an Irish ethnicity. In all previous British censuses, figures for the Irish community were based on Irish birthplace. The percentage claiming White Irish descent in England and Wales was 1.2 per cent, with the highest concentration found in the London Borough of Brent, where they made up 6.9 per cent of the population, while the figure for Scotland was 0.98 per cent. The Irish have been the largest source of immigrants to Britain for over 200 years and as many as six million people in the UK are estimated to have at least one Irish grandparent.

=== 2011 census ===
As of 2011, the highest concentration was in the London Borough of Brent where they made up 4.0 per cent of the population. This was followed by the Inner London boroughs of Islington, Hammersmith and Fulham and Camden, and the Outer London boroughs of Ealing and Harrow (all above 3.0 per cent). The highest concentration outside London was the city of Manchester, at 2.4 per cent.

=== 2021 census ===
==== Profile of Irish in England in 2021 ====
The age profile of the Irish-born is shown below. The population is aging, with 63% aged over 50 (compared to 39% among those born in England). 50.4% of those born in the Republic of Ireland arrived before 1981. Since those born in Northern Ireland are counted as UK citizens, information on when they moved is not available.

Age profile of Irish-born in England
	0–15	16–24	25–34	35–49	50–64	65 and over	Median age
Born in Republic of Ireland	3.7%	4.7%	8.6%	16.8%	19.6%	46.6%	61
Born in Northern Ireland	2.4%	8.2%	12.0%	19.7%	26.1%	31.7%	53
Born in Ireland total	3.2%	6.0%	9.9%	17.9%	22.0%	41.0%	58

Almost two thirds of Irish people under 50 in England are now full time students (ages 16–24) or working in professional, administrative, and management positions. This is in comparison to 49% of 16-24 year olds in full time education, and 43% of the population in professional, administrative and management positions in the English-born.

Percentage of Irish-born in higher managerial, administrative and professional occupations in England, by age group
	16-24	25-34	35-49	50-64	65 and over	All ages
Born in Republic of Ireland	3.9%	27.6%	29.6%	18.5%	6.6%	14.8%
Born in Northern Ireland	4.3%	29.1%	30.0%	22.1%	12.6%	20.1%
Born in Ireland total	4.1%	28.3%	29.8%	20.1%	8.3%	16.8%
Born in England	3.5%	15.6%	18.6%	14.1%	10.5%	12.9%

Percentage of Irish-born in lower managerial, administrative and professional occupations in England, by age group
	16–24	25–34	35–49	50–64	65 and over	All ages
Born in Republic of Ireland	9.4%	37.8%	30.9%	24.3%	18.1%	22.9%
Born in Northern Ireland	10.4%	36.9%	33.7%	26.8%	22.6%	26.7%
Born in Ireland total	9.9%	37.4%	32.0%	25.4%	19.4%	24.4%
Born in England	7.9%	26.1%	26.1%	21.4%	18.8%	20.6%

Percentage of Irish-born who are full time students in England, by age group
	16–24	25–34	35–49	50–64	65 and over	All ages
Born in Republic of Ireland	64.1%	4.1%	1.0%	0.4%	0.2%	3.8%
Born in Northern Ireland	63.9%	4.2%	0.8%	0.3%	0.2%	6.1%
Born in Ireland total	64.0%	4.2%	0.9%	0.3%	0.2%	4.7%
Born in England	49.1%	2.6%	0.8%	0.3%	0.1%	7.4%

Similarly, a significantly higher percentage of Irish-born people hold a degree or equivalent, compared to England overall. Nearly 75% of 25-34 year olds and 66% of 35–44 year olds hold a degree, compared to 43–45% of English people. It is higher across all age groups under 75.

Percentage of Irish-born in England who hold a degree, by age group
	16–24	25–34	35–44	45–54	55–64	65–74	75 and over	All Ages
Born in Republic of Ireland	25.2%	74.5%	65.8%	51.2%	38.0%	22.6%	14.9%	35.9%
Born in Northern Ireland	31.2%	75.2%	68.0%	56.8%	45.9%	36.0%	23.1%	47.7%
Born in Ireland total	28.3%	74.8%	66.7%	53.7%	41.4%	27.1%	17.0%	40.4%
Born in England	17.8%	45.0%	43.3%	34.5%	29.0%	25.4%	17.5%	31.0%

There are few significant differences between those born in Northern Ireland and those born in the Republic, among the Irish-born in England under 50. However those born in Northern Ireland and over 50 are more likely to have a degree and to be in a professional occupation.

==== Profile of Irish in Scotland in 2022 ====
The 2022 Scottish census reports 59,343 residents (1.1% of the Scottish population) who were born in Ireland, of which 37,260 (2% of the population of Northern Ireland) were born in Northern Ireland and 22,083 born in the Republic of Ireland (0.4% of its population).

The age profile of the Irish-born in Scotland from the 2022 Census is shown below. Compared to the population in England, the Irish-born living in Scotland are much younger, with fewer than half over 50 and a median age in the mid-40s.

Age profile of Irish-born in Scotland
	0–15	16–24	25–34	35–49	50–64	65 and over	Median age
Born in Republic of Ireland	5.1%	12.4%	15.7%	24.0%	16.2%	26.5%	45
Born in Northern Ireland	2.9%	13.2%	14.5%	26.1%	22.3%	21.0%	46
Born in Ireland total	3.7%	12.9%	14.9%	25.3%	20.1%	23.0%	45

Similar to the Irish in England, the majority are either full time students (72% of 16-24 year olds) or in managerial, administrative and professional occupations (60% of those between 25 and 50). Irish-born are twice as likely to be in upper managerial, administrative and professional occupations as those born in Scotland.

Percentage of Irish-born in higher managerial, administrative and professional occupations in Scotland, by age group
	16-24	25-34	35-49	50-64	65 and over	All ages
Born in Republic of Ireland	2.7%	21.4%	29.3%	23.3%	8.2%	17.6%
Born in Northern Ireland	3.8%	28.6%	31.2%	24.4%	14.7%	22.0%
Born in Ireland total	3.4%	25.8%	30.5%	24.1%	11.9%	20.4%
Born in Scotland	3.0%	12.3%	15.2%	11.8%	9.2%	10.8%

Percentage of Irish-born in lower managerial, administrative and professional occupations in Scotland, by age group
	16–24	25–34	35–49	50–64	65 and over	All ages
Born in Republic of Ireland	8.5%	35.8%	31.6%	27.4%	19.7%	25.2%
Born in Northern Ireland	7.6%	30.1%	29.8%	26.2%	24.5%	24.9%
Born in Ireland total	7.9%	32.4%	30.5%	26.5%	22.5%	25.0%
Born in Scotland	6.4%	21.3%	22.8%	19.3%	17.0%	18.1%

Percentage of Irish-born who are full time students in Scotland, by age group
	16–24	25–34	35–49	50–64	65 and over	All ages
Born in Republic of Ireland	71.2%	12.6%	1.8%	0.4%	0.2%	12.0%
Born in Northern Ireland	72.3%	5.9%	1.2%	0.4%	0.1%	11.2%
Born in Ireland total	71.9%	8.5%	1.4%	0.4%	0.2%	11.5%
Born in Scotland	46.4%	4.7%	1.5%	0.5%	0.1%	6.9%

Similarly, a significantly higher percentage of Irish-born people hold a degree or equivalent, compared to Scotland overall. More than 75% of 25-34 year olds and nearly 70% of 35–49 year olds hold a degree. Irish-born are twice as likely to have a degree than those born in Scotland

Percentage of Irish-born in Scotland who hold a degree, by age group
	16–24	25–34	35–49	50–64	65 and over	All Ages
Born in Republic of Ireland	36.2%	78.5%	69.3%	54.5%	26.9%	52.1%
Born in Northern Ireland	30.5%	73.0%	69.2%	54.8%	38.7%	54.6%
Born in Ireland total	32.5%	75.2%	69.3%	54.7%	33.7%	53.7%
Born in Scotland	15.7%	37.3%	36.1%	26.3%	21.6%	27.3%

== Britons of Irish ancestry ==
See: British people of Irish descent

== See also ==
- Anglo-Irish
- Glorious Revolution
- Ireland–United Kingdom relations
- Irish in Britain (charity)
- Irish military diaspora#Britain
- James II of England
- Lilliburlero
- St Giles in the Fields

== Explanatory notes ==
1. The article "More Britons applying for Irish passports" states that 6 million British nationals have either an Irish grandfather or grandmother and are thus able to apply for Irish citizenship.

== Citations ==
=== General and cited references ===
- Bailey, Craig (2013). Irish London: Middle-Class Migration in the Global Eighteenth Century. Liverpool University Press. ISBN 978-1-84631-881-8.
- Belchem, John (2007). Irish, Catholic and Scouse. Liverpool University Press. ISBN 978-1-84631-108-6.
- Bowen, Desmond (2015). Heroic Option: The Irish in the British Army. Leo Cooper Ltd. ISBN 978-1-84415-152-3.
- Bredin, H. E. N. (1994). Clear the Way!: History of the 38th (Irish) Brigade, 1941–47. Irish Academic Press. ISBN 978-0-7165-2542-4.
- Brady, L. (1984). T. P. O'Connor and the Liverpool Irish. Boydell & Brewer. ISBN 978-0-391-02957-6.
- Burrowes, John (2004). Irish: The Remarkable Saga of a Nation and a City. Mainstream Publishing. ISBN 978-1-84018-851-6.
- Busteed, Mervyn (2015). The Irish in Manchester c. 1750–1921: Resistance, Adaptation and Identity. Manchester University Press. ISBN 978-0-7190-8719-6.
- Carney, Sean (2012). The Forgotten Irish: The History of a South Yorkshire Irish Mining Community. Black Tree Publishing. ISBN 978-0-9552529-0-7.
- Cowley, Ultan (2001). The Men Who Built Britain: A History of Irish Labour in British Construction. Merlin Publishing. ISBN 978-0-86327-829-7.
- Daly, Gerry (2011). Crown, Empire and Home Rule: The Irish in Portsmouth c. 1880–1923. VDM Verlag Dr. Müller. ISBN 978-3-639-09018-5.
- Davis, Graham (1991). The Irish in Britain, 1815–1914. Gill & Macmillan Ltd. ISBN 978-0-7171-1656-0.
- Delaney, Enda (2013). The Irish in Post-War Britain. OUP Oxford. ISBN 978-0-19-968607-0.
- Denvir, John (1892). The Irish in Britain from the Earliest Times to the Fall and Death of Parnell. Kegan Paul, Trench, Trübner. ISBN 978-1-117-50526-8.
- Dunne, Catherine (2003). An Unconsidered People: The Irish in London. New Island Books. ISBN 978-1-902602-75-2.
- Finnegan, Frances (1982). Poverty and Prejudice: A Study of Irish Immigrants in York 1840–1875. Cork University Press. ASIN B001OOW5P4.
- Gallman, J. Matthew (2000). Receiving Erin's Children: Philadelphia, Liverpool and the Irish Famine Migration, 1845–1855. U of North Carolina Press. ISBN 978-0-8078-4845-6.
- Gannon, Darragh. (2014) "The Rise of the Rainbow Chasers: Advanced Irish Political Nationalism in Britain, 1916–22." Éire-Ireland 49.3 (2014): 112–142. online
- Harte, Liam (2011). The Literature of the Irish in Britain: Autobiography and Memoir, 1725–2001. Palgrave Macmillan. ISBN 978-0-230-29636-7.
- Heinrick, Hugh (1872). A Survey of the Irish in England. The Hambledon Press. ISBN 978-1-85285-010-4.
- Herbert, Michael John (2001). The Wearing of the Green: A Political History of the Irish in Manchester. Irish in Britain Representation Group. ISBN 978-0-9541378-0-9.
- Hollen Lees, Lynn (1979). Exiles of Erin: Irish Migrants in Victorian London. Cornell U. Press. ISBN 978-0-8014-1176-2.
- Hughes, Arlene (2014). Changing Skies: Manchester Irish Writers. PublishNation. ASIN B00MM71J3Q.
- Keegan, Alan (2013). Irish Manchester Revisited. The History Press. ISBN 978-0-7524-8816-5.
- Kelly, Michael (2009). Liverpool's Irish Connection. AJH Publishing. ISBN 978-0-9554854-0-4.
- Lambert, Sharon (2001). Irish Women in Lancashire: Their Story. Lancaster U. Press. ISBN 978-1-86220-110-1.
- MacAmhlaigh, Donall (2013). An Irish Navvy: The Diary of an Exile. Collins Press. ISBN 978-1-84889-188-3.
- McBride, Terence. "Ribbonmen and radicals: the cultivation of Irishness and the promotion of active citizenship in mid-Victorian Glasgow." Irish Studies Review 23.1 (2015): 15–32.
- MacRaild, Donald. (2013) "‘No Irish Need Apply’: The Origins and Persistence of a Prejudice." Labour History Review 78.3 (2013): 269-299.
- MacRaild, Donald M. (1998). Culture, Conflict and Migration: Irish in Victorian Cumbria. Liverpool University Press. ISBN 978-0-85323-662-7.
- MacRaild, Donald M. (2009). Faith, Fraternity & Fighting: The Orange Order and Irish Migrants in Northern England, c. 1850–1920. Chicago University Press. ISBN 978-0-85323-939-0.
- MacRaild, Donald M. (2010). The Irish Diaspora in Britain, 1750–1939. Palgrave Macmillan. ISBN 978-0-230-24029-2.
- McCallum, Ian (2013). The Celtic, Glasgow Irish and the Great War: The Gathering Storms. Mr Ian McCallum BEM. ISBN 978-0-9541263-2-2.
- McCready, Richard Blake (2002). The Social and Political Impact of the Irish in Dundee, c. 1845–1922. University of Dundee. ASIN B001ABUFLM.
- McGarrigle, Stephen (1991). Green Gunners: Arsenal's Irish. Mainstream Publishing. ISBN 978-1-85158-442-0.
- McGowan, Brendan (2009). Taking the Boat: The Irish in Leeds, 1931–81: An Oral History. Brendan McGowan. ISBN 978-0-9563757-0-4.
- McGuirk, Brian (2013). Celtic FC: The Irish Connection. Black & White Publishing. ASIN B00BHOSH8K.
- Mitchell, Martin J. (2008). New Perspectives on the Irish in Scotland. John Donald Short Run Press. ISBN 978-1-904607-83-0.
- Moran, James (2010). Irish Birmingham: A History. Liverpool University Press. ISBN 978-1-84631-475-9.
- Moulton, Mo (2014). Ireland and the Irish in Interwar England. Cambridge University Press. ISBN 978-1-107-05268-0.
- Neal, Frank (2003). Sectarian Violence: The Liverpool Experience, 1819–1914, An Aspect of Anglo-Irish History. Newsham Press. ISBN 978-0-9545013-0-3.
- Noonan, Gerald (2014). The IRA in Britain, 1919–1923: In the Heart of Enemy Lines. Liverpool University Press. ISBN 978-1-78138-026-0.
- O'Connor, Steven (2014). Irish Officers in the British Forces, 1922–45. Palgrave Macmillan. ISBN 978-1-137-35085-5.
- O'Leary, Paul (2002). Immigration and Integration: The Irish in Wales, 1798–1922. University of Wales. ISBN 978-0-7083-1767-9.
- O'Leary, Paul (2004). Irish Migrants in Modern Wales. Liverpool University Press. ISBN 978-0-85323-858-4.
- O'Mara, Pat (2007). Autobiography of a Liverpool Irish Slummy. The Bluecoat Press. ASIN B00SLVQOB4.
- Price, R. T. (1992). Little Ireland: Aspects of the Irish and Greenhill, Swansea. City of Swansea. ISBN 978-0-946001-21-7.
- Reid, Colin W. (2016) "Citizens of Nowhere: longing, belonging and exile among Irish Protestant writers in Britain, c. 1830–1970." Irish Studies Review 24.3 (2016): 255–274.
- Rogers, Ken (2010). The Lost Tribe of Everton and Scottie Road. Trinity Mirror Sport Media. ISBN 978-1-906802-48-6.
- Silva, Corrine (2006). Roisin Ban: The Irish Diaspora in Leeds. Leeds Irish Health and Homes. ISBN 978-0-9552529-0-7.
- Sorohan, Sean (2012). Irish London During the Troubles. Irish Academic Press. ISBN 978-0-7165-3103-6.
- Swift, Roger (1989). The Irish in Britain, 1815–1939. Pinter Publishers. ISBN 978-0-86187-774-4.
- Swift, Roger (1999). The Irish in Victorian Britain: The Local Dimension. Four Courts Press. ISBN 978-1-85182-444-1.
- Swift, Roger (2002). Irish Migrants in Britain 1815–1914: Documentary History. Cork University Press. ISBN 978-1-85918-236-9.
- Swift, Roger (2010). Irish Identities in Victorian Britain. Routledge. ISBN 978-0-415-58286-5.
- Vaughan, Geraldine (2013). The 'Local' Irish in the West of Scotland 1851–1921. Palgrave Pivot. ISBN 978-1-137-32983-7.
- Waller, P. J. (1981). Democracy and Sectarianism: Political and Social History of Liverpool, 1868–1939. Liverpool University Press. ISBN 978-0-85323-074-8.
- White, John D. T. (2012). Irish Devils: The Official Story of Manchester United and the Irish. Simon & Schuster. ISBN 978-0-85720-645-9.
