= Demographics of England =

- Population pyramid of England in 2021
- Population: 56,489,800 ▲ (2021)
- Density: 434/km^{2} (1,120/sq mi)
- Fertility rate: 1.61 (2021)

Age structure
- 0–14 years: 17.4% (2021)
- 15–64 years: 64.1%
- 65 and over: 18.6%

Nationality
- Nationality: English (2021)
- Major ethnic: ▼ White: 81.0% ▼ White British: 73.5% (2021) ▼ White Irish: 0.9% ▲ Other White: 6.6%
- Minor ethnic: ▲ Asian British: (9.7%) ▲ Black British: (4.2%) ▲ British Mixed: (2.9%) ▲ Other: (2.2%)

Language
- Spoken: British English

Map of population density in England as at the 2011 census

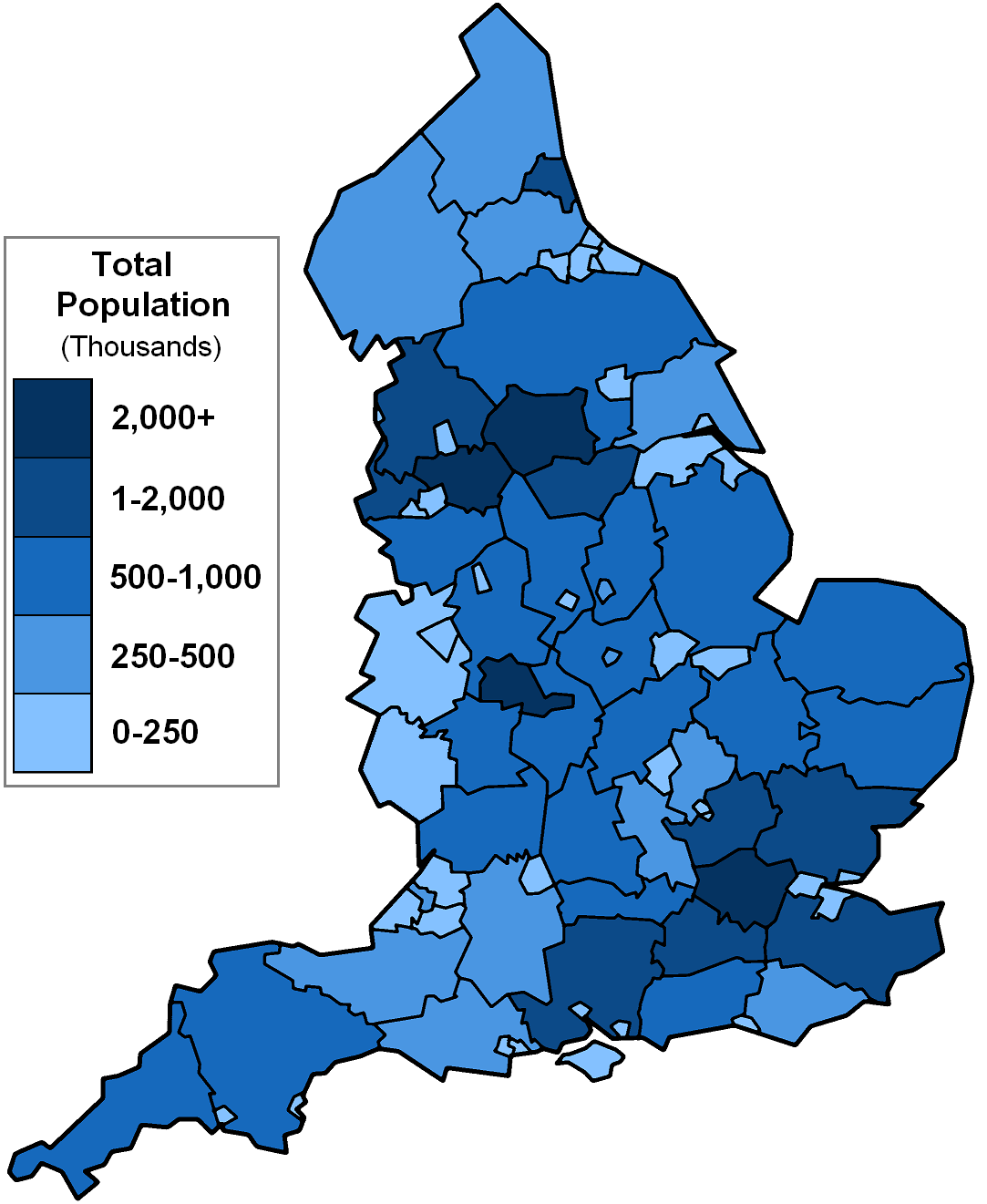
The non-metropolitan counties and unitary authorities of England in 2020 by total population.

The demographics of England have been measured by the decennial national census since 1801, and are marked by centuries of population growth and urbanization. Due to the lack of authoritative contemporary sources, estimates of the population of England for dates prior to the first census in 1801 vary considerably. The population of England at the 2021 census was about 56,489,800.

== Population ==
The population of England in 2021 was estimated to be 56,489,800. This is the most recent census. In the previous census, in 2011, the population was 53,012,456.

Data for the 2021 census:

- Female: 28,833,712
- Male: 27,656,336
- Total population: 56,489,800
- Total Fertility Rate: 1.61 (2021)

== Historical population ==
Population of England over time

=== Domesday population ===
Russell (1948) states that the fundamental demographic categories of the Domesday Survey in 1086 were broadly similar to that of the Poll Tax Survey of 1377. These were:

- Landowners (agriculturalists)
- Burgesses
- Clergy

There was a recorded 740 monks, 200 nuns and 4500 secular clergy in 1086. The counties of Cheshire, Cumberland, Durham, Lancashire, Northumberland, Westmorland, Yorkshire all had different boundaries to their modern namesakes and had uncharacteristically low populations due to the Harrying of the North.

Estimated Population of Domesday Counties
County	Landed group	Burghal group	Total
Bedfordshire	13,562	420	13,982
Berkshire	22,082	2,558	24,640
Buckinghamshire	18,879	560	19,439
Cambridgeshire	18,098	1,960	20,058
Cornwall	19,033		19,033
Derbyshire	9,982	490	10,472
Devon	60,095	2,562	62,657
Dorset	26,736	3,152	29,888
Essex	53,991	2,082	56,073
Gloucestershire	28,749	5,138	33,877
Hampshire	35,312	7,032	42,344
Herefordshire	18,543	1,991	20,534
Hertfordshire	14,388	1,558	15,946
Huntingdonshire	8,998	1,316	10,314
Kent	40,348	8,238	48,586
Leicestershire	23,320	1,278	24,598
Lincolnshire	83,384	6,957	90,341
Middlesex	7,833	17,850	25,683
Norfolk	87,437	8,001	95,438
Northamptonshire	29,008	1,032	30,040
Nottinghamshire	19,040	1,190	20,230
Oxfordshire	23,706	1,431	25,137
Rutland	2,992		2,992
Shropshire	17,056-	922	17,978
Somerset	46,473	3,811	50,284
Staffordshire	10,874	746	11,620
Suffolk	68,870	4,248	73,118
Surrey	14,728	1,197	15,925
Sussex	35,490	7,133	42,623
Warwickshire	22,631	1,284	23,915
Wiltshire	34,489	6,416	40,905
Worcestershire	15,449	1,550	16,999
Cheshire	4,038	2,142	6,180
Cumberland	5,971		5,971
Durham	3,983	1,000	4,983
Lancashire	7,385		7,385
Northumberland	7,927		7,927
Westmorland	3,098		3,098
Yorkshire	23,827	4,726	28,553
Total	987,805	111,971	1,099,766

Russell (1948) therefore calculates a total English population in 1086 as 1,105,216 including burgesses, landowners and clergy. To this he adds estimates of Wales (100,000), Ireland (400,000) and Scotland (120,000) for a total British Isles population of roughly 1,720,000.

Population 5000–100 BC
Year	Pop.	±%
5000BC	below 6000	—
3000BC	100,000	—
1800BC	300,000	+200.0%
100BC	1,500,000	+400.0%

Population 1086–1700
Year	Pop.	±% p.a.
1086	1,710,000	—
1190	3,100,000	+0.57%
1220	3,970,000	+0.83%
1250	4,230,000	+0.21%
1279	4,430,000	+0.16%
1290	4,750,000	+0.64%
1315	4,690,000	−0.05%
1325	4,120,000	−1.29%
1348	4,810,000	+0.68%
1351	2,600,000	−18.54%
1377	2,500,000	−0.15%
1400	2,080,000	−0.80%
1430	2,020,000	−0.10%
1450	1,900,000	−0.31%
1490	2,140,000	+0.30%
1522	2,350,000	+0.29%
1541	2,830,000	+0.98%
1560	3,020,000	+0.34%
1600	4,110,000	+0.77%
1650	5,310,000	+0.51%
1700	5,200,000	−0.04%

Population 1801–2023
Year	Pop.	±%
1801	8,287,907	—
1811	9,405,342	+13.5%
1821	11,178,050	+18.8%
1831	12,976,329	+16.1%
1841	14,847,888	+14.4%
1851	16,738,495	+12.7%
1861	18,753,390	+12.0%
1871	21,361,235	+13.9%
1881	24,397,385	+14.2%
1891	27,231,229	+11.6%
1901	30,072,180	+10.4%
1911	33,561,235	+11.6%
1921	35,230,225	+5.0%
1931	37,359,045	+6.0%
1939	38,084,321	+1.9%
1951	41,164,356	+8.1%
1961	43,460,525	+5.6%
1971	46,411,700	+6.8%
1981	46,820,800	+0.9%
1991	47,875,000	+2.3%
2001	49,138,831	+2.6%
2011	53,012,456	+7.9%
2021	56,489,800	+6.6%
2023	57,690,300	+2.1%
Source: Year(s) 1801–2011

== Vital statistics ==
This is UK wide information.

	Average population	Live births	Deaths	Natural change	Crude birth rate (per 1000)	Crude death rate (per 1000)	Natural change (per 1000)	Fertility rates
1929		599,078						
1930		604,870						
1931		589,751						
1932		573,099						
1933		540,989						
1934		557,686						
1935		559,569						
1936		567,383						
1937		573,382						
1938		583,579						
1939		581,950						
1940		567,710	545,952	21,758	14.1	13.6	0.5	
1941(c)		539,205	499,343	39,862	13.9	12.9	1.0	
1942		608,373	448,777	159,596	15.6	11.5	4.1	
1943		641,064	469,916	171,148	16.2	11.9	4.3	
1944		704,748	461,189	243,559	17.7	11.6	6.1	
1945		638,422	456,216	182,206	15.9	11.4	4.5	
1946		773,153	460,543	312,610	19.2	11.4	7.8	
1947		829,863	484,324	345,539	20.5	12.0	8.5	
1948		728,131	439,803	288,328	17.9	10.8	7.1	
1949		686,181	478,627	207,554	16.8	11.7	5.1	
1950		654,321	477,006	177,315	15.5	11.3	4.2	
1951(c)	41,164,356	636,259	513,375	122,884	15.5	12.5	3.0	
1952		632,347	466,479	165,858	15.3	11.3	4.0	
1953		642,844	472,137	170,707	15.5	11.3	4.2	
1954		633,395	469,074	164,321	15.2	11.3	3.9	
1955		628,935	484,926	144,009	15.0	11.7	3.3	
1956		659,420	488,893	170,527	15.7	11.7	4.0	
1957		681,736	482,174	199,562	16.1	11.5	4.6	
1958		698,255	494,201	204,054	16.4	11.7	4.7	
1959		706,239	495,517	210,722	16.5	11.6	4.9	
1960		740,858	493,553	247,305	17.1	11.5	5.6	
1961(c)	43,460,525	766,358	518,047	248,311	17.6	11.9	5.7	
1962		793,354	523,855	269,499	18.0	12.0	6.0	
1963		807,017	538,105	268,912	18.2	12.2	6.0	
1964		828,470	501,991	326,479	18.5	11.3	7.2	
1965		816,433	516,317	300,116	18.1	11.5	6.6	
1966		804,957	528,981	275,976	17.7	11.8	5.9	
1967		788,458	509,356	279,102	17.2	11.2	6.0	
1968		775,065	541,862	233,203	16.9	11.9	5.0	
1969		754,456	543,425	211,031	16.4	11.9	4.5	
1970		741,999	540,196	201,803	16.0	11.6	4.4	
1971(c)	46,411,700	740,099	532,445	207,654	15.9	11.5	4.4	
1972	46,572,000	685,485	554,251	131,234	14.7	11.9	2.8	
1973	46,686,000	638,356	549,876	88,480	13.7	11.8	1.9	
1974	46,682,000	603,153	547,980	55,173	12.9	11.7	1.2	
1975	46,674,000	568,900	545,444	23,456	12.2	11.7	0.5	
1976	46,659,000	550,383	560,317	−9,934	11.8	12.0	−0.2	
1977	46,639,000	536,953	538,652	−1,699	11.5	11.5	−0.0	
1978	46,638,000	562,589	547,685	14,904	12.1	11.7	0.4	
1979	46,698,000	601,316	554,840	46,476	12.9	11.9	1.0	
1980	46,787,000	618,371	544,349	74,022	13.2	11.6	1.6	
1981(c)	46,820,800	598,163	541,018	57,145	12.8	11.6	1.2	
1982	46,777,000	589,711	544,984	44,727	12.6	11.7	0.9	1.76
1983	46,813,000	593,255	542,509	50,746	12.7	11.6	1.1	1.75
1984	46,912,000	600,573	531,314	69,259	12.8	11.3	1.5	1.75
1985	47,057,000	619,301	553,153	66,148	13.2	11.8	1.4	1.78
1986	47,187,000	623,609	544,545	79,064	13.2	11.5	1.7	1.76
1987	47,300,000	643,330	531,150	112,180	13.6	11.2	2.4	1.80
1988	47,412,000	654,353	535,553	118,800	13.8	11.3	2.5	1.82
1989	47,552,000	649,357	539,804	109,553	13.7	11.4	2.3	1.79
1990	47,699,000	666,920	528,920	138,000	14.0	11.1	3.9	1.83
1991(c)	47,875,000	660,806	533,980	126,826	13.8	11.2	2.6	1.81
1992	47,998,000	651,784	522,660	129,124	13.6	10.9	2.7	1.79
1993	48,102,000	636,473	540,904	95,569	13.2	11.2	2.0	1.76
1994	48,228,000	628,956	516,297	112,659	13.0	10.7	2.3	1.75
1995	48,383,000	613,257	529,038	84,219	12.7	10.9	1.8	1.71
1996	48,519,000	614,184	526,650	87,534	12.7	10.9	1.8	1.73
1997	48,664,000	608,202	521,598	86,604	12.5	10.7	1.8	1.73
1998	48,820,000	602,111	518,089	84,022	12.3	10.6	1.7	1.72
1999	49,032,000	589,468	517,119	72,349	12.0	10.5	1.5	1.69
2000	49,233,000	572,826	503,026	69,800	11.6	10.2	1.4	1.65
2001(c)	49,449,000	563,744	497,878	65,866	11.4	10.1	1.3	1.63
2002	49,679,000	565,709	500,792	64,917	11.4	10.1	1.3	1.64
2003	49,925,000	589,851	504,127	85,724	11.8	10.1	1.7	1.72
2004	50,194,000	607,184	480,717	126,467	12.1	9.6	2.5	1.77
2005	50,606,000	613,028	479,678	133,350	12.1	9.5	2.6	1.77
2006	50,965,000	635,748	470,326	165,422	12.5	9.2	3.3	1.83
2007	51,381,000	655,357	470,721	184,636	12.8	9.2	3.6	1.88
2008	51,815,000	672,809	475,763	197,046	13.0	9.2	3.8	1.92
2009	52,196,000	671,058	459,241	211,817	12.9	8.8	4.1	1.91
2010	52,642,000	687,007	461,017	225,990	13.1	8.8	4.3	1.94
2011(c)	53,107,000	688,120	452,862	235,258	13.0	8.5	4.5	1.93
2012	53,493,000	694,241	466,779	227,462	13.0	8.7	4.3	1.94
2013	53,865,000	664,517	473,552	190,965	12.3	8.8	3.5	1.85
2014	54,316,000	661,496	468,875	192,621	12.2	8.6	3.6	1.83
2015	54,786,000	664,399	495,309	169,090	12.1	9.0	3.1	1.82
2016	55,268,000	663,157	490,454	172,703	12.0	8.9	3.1	1.81
2017	55,619,000	646,794	498,882	147,912	11.6	9.0	2.6	1.76
2018	55,977,000	625,651	505,859	119,792	11.2	9.0	2.2	1.70
2019	56,287,000	610,505	488,952	121,553	10.8	8.7	2.1	1.66
2020	56,550,000	585,195	569,700	15,495	10.3	10.1	0.3	1.59
2021(c)	56,489,800	595,948	549,207	46,741	10.5	9.7	0.8	1.56
2022	57,106,398	577,046	540,333	36,713	10.2	9.5	0.7	1.49
2023	57,910,000	563,561	544,032	19,529	9.8	9.4	0.4	1.44
2024	58,607,200	567,708	531,953	35,755	9.7	9.1	0.6	1.42
2025	58,834,800	558,988	534,020	24,968	9.5	9.1	0.4	1.39

(c) = Census results.

In 2025, 35.5% of live births were to mothers born outside the UK and for 41.1% of live births, one or both parents were born outside of the UK.

=== Current vital statistics ===
Period	Live births	Deaths	Natural increase
January—June 2025	276,063	278,000	–1,937
January—June 2026	274,406	271,908	+2,498
Difference	▼ −1,657 (−0.6%)	▼ –6,092 (–2.19%)	▲ +4,435

== Population distributions by age band, 20th century ==
This shows a trend of an ageing population with increasing expectation of life and falling fertility rates.

Age distribution by census year
Age band	1901	1931	1951	1961
0–14	32%	24%	22%	23%
15–64	63%	69%	67%	65%
65 years and over	5%	7%	11%	12%
Total	100%	100%	100%	100%

== Country of birth ==
Country of birth given by respondents in the corresponding UK censuses were as follows:

Map showing the percentage of the population born outside England according to the 2011 census.

Country of birth	1971		1981		1991		2001		2011		2021	
Country of birth	Number	%	Number	%	Number	%	Number	%	Number	%	Number	%
United Kingdom	41,951,042	91.3%	42,620,882	93.1%	43,506,411	92.46%	44,594,817	90.75%	45,675,317	86.16%	46,687,505	82.65%
England	40,374,714	87.9%	41,084,399	89.8%	42,003,211	89.3%	42,968,596	87.44%	44,246,592	83.46%	45,388,724	80.35%
Scotland	716,499	1.6%	731,412	1.7%	743,856	1.58%	794,577	1.62%	708,872	1.34%	626,443	1.11%
Wales	632,548	1.4%	573,014	1.3%	545,381	1.16%	609,711	1.24%	506,619	0.96%	478,697	0.85%
Northern Ireland	227,281	0.5%	–	–	211,133	0.45%	215,124	0.44%	206,735	0.39%	190,541	0.34%
United Kingdom (not otherwise specified)	–	–	232,057		2,830	0.01%	6,809	0.01%	6,499	0.01%	2,612	
Europe (non-UK)	1,217,245	2.7%	1,142,182	2.4%	1,196,524	2.5%	1,450,260	2.95%	2,375,441	4.5%	4,042,538	7.16%
(Republic of Ireland) Ireland	647,429	1.4%	567,021	1.3%	555,805	1.18%	460,287	0.94%	395,182	0.75%	314,674	0.56%
Channel Islands & Isle of Man	–	–	–	–	26,303	0.06%	27,550	0.06%	24,653	0.05%		
Total born in all EU Member Countries (excluding Ireland)	569,816 (Note: Figure accounts for all of Europe apart from Ireland)	1.2%	340,113	0%	452,092	1%	660,061	1.34%	1,980,259	3.73%	3,236,799	5.73%
EU Member Countries (joined pre-2001) or EEC Members	–	–	340,113		452,092	1%	–	–	894,908	1.69%	1,263,707	2.24%
Germany	–	–	–	–	193,346	0.41%	233,418	0.48%	262,356	0.49%	252,252	0.45%
Italy	–	–	–	–	83,724	0.18%	98,757	0.20%	131,195	0.25%	272,019	0.48%
France	–	–	–	–	49,947	0.11%	87,562	0.18%	127,601	0.24%	152,697	0.27%
Spain	–	–	–	–	37,006	0.08%	50,431	0.10%	77,554	0.15%	163,848	0.29%
Other EU Member Countries (joined post-2001)	–	–	–	–	–	–	–	–	1,085,351	2.04%	1,973,092	3.49%
Poland	–	–	–	–	68,049	0.14%	56,679	0.12%	561,098	1.06%	718,251	1.27%
Romania	–	–	–	–	3,762	0.01%	7,077	0.01%	78,192	0.15%	530,320	0.94%
Other non-EU Europe	–	–	235,048	0.5%	115,247	0.2%	–	–	–	–	491,065	0.87%
Turkey	–	–	–	–	26,016	0.06%	52,402	0.11%	89,484	0.17%	124,758	0.22%
USSR	–	–	–	–	25,235	0.05%	27,250	0.06%	–	–	–	–
Africa	148,473	0.3%	278,678	0.6%	456,396	1%	798,218	1.62%	1,290,611	2.43%	1,558,199	2.76%
South Africa	–	–	–	–	21,220	0.05%	129,302	0.26%	186,355	0.35%	211,447	0.37%
Kenya	–	–	–	–	109,610	0.23%	126,119	0.26%	135,966	0.26%	133,416	0.24%
Nigeria	–	–	–	–	45,873	0.10%	86,370	0.18%	188,690	0.36%	266,877	0.47%
Middle East and Asia	522,263	1.1%	727,838	1.6%	1,108,529	2.4%	1,778,296	3.62%	2,529,137	4.77%	3,241,701	5.74%
India	301,862	0.7%	378,721	0.9%	395,563	0.84%	450,493	0.92%	682,274	1.29%	906,962	1.61%
Pakistan	131,826	0.3%	179,712	0.4%	221,776	0.47%	304,706	0.62%	476,684	0.90%	616,454	1.09%
Bangladesh	131,826	0.3%	46,873	0.1%	101,829	0.22%	150,057	0.31%	206,331	0.39%	266,290	0.47%
Sri Lanka	15,366		–	–	38,145	0.08%	66,330	0.13%	125,917	0.24%	141,861	0.25%
Far East	73,209		122,532	0.3%	–	–	360,604	0.73%	–	–	–	–
Hong Kong	–	–	–	–	64,496	0.14%	84,770	0.17%	98,724	0.19%	117,714	0.21%
China	–	–	–	–	21,292	0.05%	47,201	0.10%	146,202	0.28%	176,072	0.31%
Americas and Caribbean	292,966	0.6%	291,679	0.6%	481,299	1%	–	–	663,091	1.25%	790,002	1.40%
United States	–	–	–	–	128,337	0.27%	141,198	0.29%	173,470	0.33%	198,656	0.35%
Jamaica	–	–	–	–	141,352	0.30%	145,234	0.30%	159,170	0.30%	141,289	0.25%
Canada	–	–	–	–	53,195	0.11%	59,356	0.12%	66,320	0.13%	66,847	0.12%
Antarctica and Oceania	–	–	–	–	104,141	0.2%	–	–	179,200	0.34%	170,023	0.30%
Australia	–	–	–	–	66,279	0.14%	96,437	0.20%	113,592	0.21%	109,963	0.19%
New Zealand	–	–	–	–	37,862	0.08%	53,466	0.11%	57,076	0.11%	47,842	0.08%
Other: Old Commonwealth (Note: Used as main option for when no other options are given, for example in 1971. This group contains all for Canada, Australia and New Zealand)	119,683	0.3%	133,220	0.3%	–	–	–	–	–	–	–	–
Other: New Commonwealth (Note: Used as a conglomerate for New Commonwealth for when there are no other options as for example in 1971. This group contains all for remenents of the British Empire after 1945 (if not already indicated).)	109,971	0.2%	155,389	0.3%	147,602	0.3%	–	–	–	–	–	–
Other Countries (non Europe or UK for 2001–2021)	482,351	1%	421,895	0.9%	–	–	3,093,754	6.30%	4,961,698	9.36%	5,760,008	10.20%
Total	45,917,667	100%	45,771,763	100%	47,055,204	100%	49,138,831	100.00%	53,012,456	100.00%	56,490,051	100%

Below are the estimates of the largest foreign-born groups in England according to ONS estimates.

Country of birth	2013	2014	2015	2018
India	698,000	748,000	751,000	832,000
Poland	561,000	677,000	713,000	832,000
Pakistan	479,000	499,000	478,000	535,000
(Republic of Ireland) Ireland	315,000	317,000	318,000	369,000
Germany	263,000	267,000	253,000	309,000

Population pyramid from 2001 to 2020

== Age ==
Population pyramid in 2020

The data below is based on the 2011 census. In 2001, the mean age of England's population was 38.60, and the median age was 37.00. In 2022, the median age was 40.5.

Ages attained (years)	Population		
Ages attained (years)	Numbers	% of total population	
Ages attained (years)	Numbers	Whole age band	Per year of age band
0–4	3,318,449	6.26	1.25
5–9	2,972,632	5.61	1.12
10–14	3,080,929	5.81	1.16
15–19	3,340,265	6.30	1.26
20–24	3,595,321	6.78	1.36
25–29	3,650,881	6.89	1.38
30–34	3,509,221	6.62	1.32
35–39	3,549,116	6.69	1.34
40–44	3,885,934	7.33	1.47
45–49	3,879,815	7.32	1.46
50–54	3,400,095	6.41	1.28
55–59	2,996,992	5.65	1.13
60–64	3,172,277	5.98	1.20
65–69	2,508,154	4.73	0.95
70–74	2,044,129	3.86	0.77
75–79	1,669,345	3.15	0.63
80–84	1,258,773	2.37	0.47
85–89	776,311	1.46	0.29
90+	403,817	0.76	–

Population pyramids of the regions of England

South West

South East

Greater London

East of England

East Midlands

West Midlands

Yorkshire and the Humber

North West

North East

== Ethnicity ==
Ethnic demographics of England from 1981 - 2021

Ethnic makeup of England in single year age groups in 2021

Estimates of selected Commonwealth non-white population in England and Wales, 1951–1968
Ethnic group (reported as 'Area of origin')	1951 (Note: Estimates taken solely from selected Commonwealth immigrant populations at the time, excluding estimates of those that were white from these areas. Does not include South Africa, Southern Rhodesia (Zimbabwe), Commonwealth East Africa, other parts of Commonwealth Africa, or non-Commonwealth countries in Africa, the Caribbean, or Asia. Colour and Citizneship p. 97.)		1961		1966 Sample Census (Note: Uniquely, this experimental census saw each household was given a short form to complete, while a sample of the population completed a more detailed long form.)				mid-1968	
Ethnic group (reported as 'Area of origin')	1951		1961		Estimates based solely on selected Commonwealth immigrant populations		Total estimated (including estimates of those born in the UK) (Note: Estimates are taken from a combined estimate of the immigrant population (excluding estimates of white people), additional non-white people who may not have been enumerated, and estimates of non-white people born in the UK from parents from shown areas. Does not include South Africa, Southern Rhodesia (Zimbabwe), Commonwealth East Africa, other parts of Commonwealth Africa, or non-Commonwealth countries in Africa, the Caribbean, or Asia. Colour and Citizneship p. 99.)		mid-1968	
Ethnic group (reported as 'Area of origin')	Number	%	Number	%	Number	%	Number	%	Number	%
Selected Commonwealth non-White: Total	74,500	0.17%	336,500	0.73%	595,100	1.26%	924,200	1.96%	1,123,000	2.31%
India	30,800		81,400		163,600		223,600		–	–
Pakistan	5,000		24,900		67,700		119,700		–	–
Ceylon (Sri Lanka)	5,800		9,000		12,900		16,100		–	–
West Indies	15,300		171,800		267,900		–	–	–	–
Jamaica	–	–	–	–	–	–	273,800		–	–
Other Caribbean (inc. British Guiana)	–	–	–	–	–	–	180,300		–	–
British West Africa (Gambia, Ghana, Nigeria and Sierra Leone)	5,600		19,800		36,000		50,700		–	–
Far East (Hong Kong, Malaya, Singapore)	12,000		29,600		47,000		60,000		–	–
Total population	43,758,000	100%	46,105,000	100%	47,135,500	100%	47,135,500	100%	48,640,000	100%

Ethnicity in England, 1981–2021
Ethnic group	Year									
Ethnic group	1981 estimations		1991 (Note: The number of people who answered the census may not equal the estimated population total at the time due to the fact an estimated 1 million people did not answer the form.)		2001		2011		2021	
Ethnic group	Population	%	Population	%	Population	%	Population	%	Population	%
White: Total	–	95.4%	44,144,339	93.8%	44,679,361	91%	45,281,142	85.4%	45,783,401	81.0%
White: British	–	–	–	–	42,747,136	87.0%	42,279,236	79.8%	41,540,791	73.5%
White: Irish	–	–	–	–	624,115	1.3%	517,001	1.0%	494,251	0.9%
White: Irish Traveller/White Gypsy	–	–	–	–	–	–	54,895	0.1%	64,218	0.1%
White: Roma	–	–	–	–	–	–	–	–	99,138	0.2%
White: Other	–	–	–	–	1,308,110	2.7%	2,430,010	4.6%	3,585,003	6.3%
Asian or Asian British: Total	–	2.65%	1,762,262	3.7%	2,468,970	5%	4,143,403	7.8%	5,426,392	9.7%
Asian or Asian British: Indian	–	1.32%	823,821	1.8%	1,028,546	2.1%	1,395,702	2.6%	1,843,248	3.3%
Asian or Asian British: Pakistani	–	0.7%	449,646	1.0%	706,539	1.4%	1,112,282	2.1%	1,570,285	2.8%
Asian or Asian British: Bangladeshi	–	0.18%	157,881	0.3%	275,394	0.6%	436,514	0.8%	629,567	1.1%
Asian or Asian British: Chinese (Note: In 2001, listed under the 'Chinese or other ethnic group' heading.)	–	0.22%	141,661	0.3%	220,681	0.5%	379,502	0.7%	431,165	0.8%
Asian or Asian British: Asian Other	–	0.23%	189,253	0.4%	237,810	0.5%	819,403	1.6%	952,127	1.7%
Black or Black British: Total	–	1.51%	874,882	1.9%	1,132,508	2.3%	1,846,614	3.5%	2,381,724	4.2%
Black or Black British: Caribbean	–	0.91%	495,682	1.1%	561,246	1.1%	591,016	1.1%	619,419	1.1%
Black or Black British: African	–	0.3%	206,918	0.4%	475,938	1.0%	977,741	1.8%	1,468,474	2.6%
Black or Black British: Other	–	0.3%	172,282	0.4%	95,324	0.2%	277,857	0.5%	293,831	0.5%
British Mixed: Total	–	–	–	–	643,373	1.3%	1,192,879	2.3%	1,669,378	2.9%
Mixed: White and Caribbean	–	–	–	–	231,424	0.5%	415,616	0.8%	499,310	0.9%
Mixed: White and African	–	–	–	–	76,498	0.2%	161,550	0.3%	241,528	0.4%
Mixed: White and Asian	–	–	–	–	184,014	0.4%	332,708	0.6%	474,190	0.8%
Mixed: Other Mixed	–	–	–	–	151,437	0.3%	283,005	0.3%	454,350	0.8%
Other: Total	–	0.44%	273,721	0.6%	214,619	0.4%	548,418	1.0%	1,229,153	2.2%
Other: Arab	–	–	–	–	–	–	220,985	0.4%	320,203	0.6%
Other: Any other ethnic group	–	0.44%	273,721	0.6%	214,619	0.4%	327,433	0.6%	908,950	1.6%
Non-White: Total	–	4.6%	2,910,865	6.2%	4,459,470	9%	7,731,314	14.6%	10,706,647	19%
Total	–	100%	47,055,204	100%	49,138,831	100%	53,012,456	100%	56,490,048	100%

Notes for table above

=== Population distribution ===
Population distribution of ethnic groups in 2011

Other White (4.6%)

Asian/Asian British: Indian (2.6%)

Asian/Asian British: Pakistani (2.1%)

Asian/Asian British: Bangladeshi (0.8%)

Black/Black British: Total (3.5%)

Other: Arab (0.4%)
Proportion of births in regions of each broad multi-ethnic group

White

Asian

Black

Mixed

All other ethnic groups

Births which did not state an ethnicity

Ethnic composition by ceremonial county

The table shows the ethnic composition in the ceremonial counties of England, based on the 2021 Census data. Percentages are rounded to one decimal place and may not sum to exactly 100% due to rounding.

Ethnic composition of ceremonial counties
County	White %	Mixed %	Asian %	Black %	Other %
Bedfordshire	72.0	3.8	16.6	5.6	1.9
Berkshire	73.1	3.6	17.1	3.8	2.4
Bristol	81.1	4.5	6.6	5.9	1.9
Buckinghamshire	77.2	3.7	12.4	5.0	1.7
Cambridgeshire	85.4	3.0	7.9	2.1	1.7
Cheshire	94.8	1.6	2.3	0.6	0.7
City of London	69.4	5.5	16.8	2.7	5.6
Cornwall	96.8	1.2	0.7	0.2	1.1
Cumbria	97.6	0.8	1.0	0.2	0.3
Derbyshire	90.7	1.9	5.0	1.4	1.0
Devon	95.8	1.5	1.6	0.5	0.6
Dorset	94.1	2.0	2.3	0.7	0.9
Durham	95.5	1.1	2.3	0.6	0.6
East Riding of Yorkshire	94.9	1.3	1.8	1.0	1.0
East Sussex	91.0	3.1	3.0	1.2	1.7
Essex	88.8	2.6	4.2	3.4	1.0
Gloucestershire	92.5	2.3	3.2	1.3	0.8
Greater London	53.8	5.7	20.7	13.5	6.3
Greater Manchester	76.4	3.0	13.6	4.7	2.3
Hampshire	90.1	2.2	5.0	1.6	1.1
Herefordshire	96.9	1.1	1.2	0.3	0.5
Hertfordshire	81.8	3.8	8.6	3.7	2.1
Isle of Wight	97.0	1.2	1.2	0.3	0.3
Kent	88.6	2.4	4.7	3.1	1.3
Lancashire	86.6	1.6	10.4	0.7	0.8
Leicestershire	71.6	2.7	20.2	3.4	2.1
Lincolnshire	95.8	1.2	1.8	0.6	0.6
Merseyside	91.7	2.1	3.1	1.5	1.5
Norfolk	94.7	1.6	2.1	0.9	0.7
North Yorkshire	94.2	1.3	2.9	0.7	0.8
Northamptonshire	87.9	2.6	4.5	4.0	1.0
Northumberland	97.7	0.8	1.0	0.2	0.3
Nottinghamshire	85.4	3.1	6.3	3.7	1.5
Oxfordshire	86.9	3.1	6.4	2.1	1.6
Rutland	94.8	1.8	1.5	1.3	0.5
Shropshire	93.6	1.7	2.8	1.3	0.6
Somerset	95.4	1.6	1.9	0.6	0.5
South Yorkshire	87.7	2.2	5.8	2.5	1.8
Staffordshire	91.3	1.9	4.8	1.2	0.8
Suffolk	93.1	2.3	2.3	1.3	0.9
Surrey	85.5	3.4	7.7	1.7	1.7
Tyne and Wear	90.5	1.5	5.1	1.5	1.4
Warwickshire	89.1	2.3	6.3	1.3	1.0
West Midlands	61.4	4.2	22.9	8.1	3.5
West Sussex	91.0	2.4	4.3	1.3	1.0
West Yorkshire	76.6	2.8	15.8	3.1	1.7
Wiltshire	90.3	2.0	5.1	1.6	0.9
Worcestershire	93.8	1.9	3.1	0.7	0.6

=== Ethnicity of school pupils ===
The ethnicity of school pupils in England has been changing since the figures were first published in 1997, White and especially White British students proportionally have been in decline compared to other groups who have risen.

Ethnic group	School year																					
Ethnic group	1997		2001		2004		2008		2010		2014		2015/16		2017/18		2019/20		2021/22		2025/26	
Ethnic group	Number	%	Number	%	Number	%	Number	%	Number	%	Number	%	Number	%	Number	%	Number	%	Number	%	Number	%
White: Total	5,976,100	89%	5,832,501	86%	5,584,800	82.9%	5,389,340	81.3%	5,243,870	79.9%	5,222,070	76.9%	5,258,582	75.6%	6,027,781	74%	6,048,980	72.8%	6,011,045	71.4%	5,636,598	67.4%
White: British	–	–	–	–	5,408,700	80.3%	5,136,610	77.4%	4,963,110	75.6%	4,859,730	71.6%	4,822,332	69.3%	5,454,108	66.9%	5,432,991	65.4%	5,379,748	63.9%	4,992,446	59.7%
White: Irish	–	–	–	–	26,100	0.3%	23,620	0.4%	22,190	0.3%	21,640	0.3%	21,127	0.3%	23,110	0.3%	22,443	0.3%	21,495	0.3%	19,625	0.2%
White: Roma	–	–	–	–	6,500	0.1%	3,940	0.1%	4,000	0.1%	4,625	0.1%	22,092	0.3%	26,653	0.3%	28,091	0.3%	27,359	0.3%	28,669	0.3%
White: Irish Traveller	–	–	–	–	3,900	0.1%	8,770	0.1%	10,990	0.2%	19,030	0.3%	4,975	0.1%	6,008	0.1%	6,578	0.1%	6,903	0.1%	6,501	0.1%
White: Other	–	–	–	–	139,600	2.1%	216,410	3.3%	243,580	3.7%	317,055	4.7%	388,056	5.6%	517,902	6.4%	558,877	6.7%	575,540	6.8%	589,357	7.1%
Asian / Asian British: Total	–	–	425,020	6.3%	476,900	7.1%	536,420	8.1%	575,670	8.8%	676,920	10.0%	755,817	10.8%	937,983	11.4%	985,795	11.9%	1,040,541	12.3%	1,170,540	14.0%
Asian / Asian British: Indian	–	–	162,498	2.4%	154,400	2.3%	161,150	2.4%	163,780	2.5%	180,995	2.7%	196,351	2.8%	247,280	3.0%	268,318	3.2%	289,179	3.4%	353,670	4.2%
Asian / Asian British: Pakistani	–	–	171,741	2.5%	180,600	2.7%	214,210	3.2%	231,380	3.5%	273,465	4.0%	293,089	4.2%	360,554	4.4%	372,699	4.5%	380,781	4.5%	390,881	4.7%
Asian / Asian British: Bangladeshi	–	–	66,854	1.0%	72,000	1.1%	87,320	1.3%	95,420	1.5%	110,735	1.6%	117,004	1.7%	143,379	1.8%	148,290	1.8%	151,613	1.8%	150,877	1.8%
Asian / Asian British: Chinese	–	–	23,927	0.4%	23,700	0.4%	24,780	0.4%	24,690	0.4%	26,725	0.4%	28,915	0.4%	36,196	0.4%	37,732	0.5%	48,396	0.6%	64,930	0.8%
Asian / Asian British: Other	–	–	–	–	46,200	0.7%	73,770	1.1%	85,080	1.3%	111,720	1.6%	120,458	1.7%	150,574	1.8%	158,756	1.9%	170,572	2.0%	210,182	2.5%
Black / Black British: Total	–	–	249,550	3.7%	244,900	3.6%	292,860	4.4%	312,260	4.8%	366,130	5.4%	389,585	5.5%	464,367	5.7%	474,570	5.7%	486,517	5.8%	590,002	7.1%
Black / Black British: Caribbean	–	–	99,139	1.5%	96,100	1.4%	92,090	1.4%	91,400	1.4%	89,350	1.3%	85,830	1.2%	91,429	1.1%	86,543	1.0%	82,402	1.0%	72,951	0.9%
Black / Black British: African	–	–	90,934	1.3%	120,900	1.8%	167,990	2.5%	184,790	2.8%	232,065	3.4%	253,781	3.6%	311,012	3.8%	323,874	3.9%	338,614	4.0%	442,053	5.3%
Black / Black British: Other	–	–	59,477	0.9%	27,900	0.4%	32,770	0.5%	36,070	0.5%	44,710	0.7%	49,974	0.7%	61,926	0.8%	64,153	0.8%	65,501	0.8%	74,998	0.9%
Mixed / British Mixed	–	–	–	–	181,500	2.7%	229,650	3.5%	256,980	3.9%	325,140	4.8%	363,730	5.3%	473,305	5.8%	515,061	6.1%	558,184	6.6%	610,250	7.3%
Mixed: White and Caribbean	–	–	–	–	64,600	1.0%	77,350	1.2%	82,410	1.3%	95,785	1.4%	101,278	1.5%	123,873	1.5%	128,774	1.5%	133,504	1.6%	134,069	1.6%
Mixed: White and African	–	–	–	–	17,000	0.3%	24,110	0.4%	27,860	0.4%	40,245	0.6%	47,472	0.7%	63,518	0.8%	70,403	0.8%	76,262	0.9%	80,139	1.0%
Mixed: White and Asian Other	–	–	–	–	36,300	0.5%	47,510	0.7%	54,610	0.8%	73,555	1.1%	84,133	1.2%	111,811	1.4%	123,153	1.5%	134,821	1.6%	147,651	1.8%
Mixed: Other Mixed	–	–	–	–	63,500	0.9%	80,680	1.2%	92,110	1.4%	115,560	1.7%	130,847	1.9%	174,103	2.1%	192,731	2.3%	213,597	2.5%	248,391	3.0%
Other: Total	–	–	169,069	2.5%	57,900	0.9%	78,560	1.2%	86,880	1.3%	106,115	1.6%	119,647	1.7%	154,575	1.9%	168,758	2.0%	185,355	2.2%	220,633	2.6%
Unclassified	–	–	108,219	1.6%	190,700	2.8%	81,300	1.2%	64,610	1.0%	67,935	1.0%	67,126	1.0%	94,312	1.2%	119,388	1.4%	136,371	1.6%	131,432	1.6%
Non-White: Total	740,600	11%																				
Total:	6,716,700	100%	6,784,458	100%	6,736,700	100%	6,632,900	100%	6,564,940	100%	6,791,030	100%	6,954,487	100%	8,152,323	100%	8,312,552	100%	8,418,013	100%	8,359,455	100%

Ethnicity of school pupils in the school year of 2021/2022

White: 71.4%

White British: 63.9%

== Languages ==
The most common main languages spoken in England according to the 2011 census are shown below.

Rank	Language	Usual residents aged 3+	Proportion
1	English	46,936,780	92.02%
2	Polish	529,173	1.04%
3	Punjabi	271,580	0.53%
4	Urdu	266,330	0.52%
5	Bengali (with Sylheti and Chatgaya)	216,196	0.42%
6	Gujarati	212,217	0.42%
7	Arabic	152,490	0.30%
8	French	145,026	0.28%
9	Portuguese	131,002	0.26%
10	Spanish	118,554	0.23%
11	Tamil	99,773	0.20%
12	Turkish	98,083	0.19%
13	Italian	90,547	0.18%
14	Somali	84,387	0.17%
15	Lithuanian	84,327	0.17%
16	German	75,190	0.15%
17	Persian/Farsi	75,179	0.15%
18	Tagalog/Filipino	67,593	0.13%
19	Romanian	66,496	0.13%
20	Russian	66,271	0.13%
–	Welsh	8,248	0.02%
–	Cornish	554	0.00%
–	Other	1,209,614	2.37%
	Total population	51,005,610	100.00%

== Religion ==
Religious makeup of England in single year age groups in 2021

Religion in England (2021 census)
1. Christianity (46.3%)
2. Not religious (36.7%)
3. Islam (6.70%)
4. Not stated (6.00%)
5. Other religions (2.50%)
6. Hinduism (1.80%)

Respondents to the 2001, 2011 and 2021 censuses gave their religions as follows:

Religion	2001		2011		2021	
Religion	Number	%	Number	%	Number	%
Christian	35,251,244	71.74%	31,479,876	59.38%	26,167,899	46.3%
Muslim	1,524,887	3.10%	2,660,116	5.02%	3,801,186	6.7%
Hindu	546,982	1.11%	806,199	1.52%	1,032,533	1.8%
Sikh	327,343	0.67%	420,196	0.79%	520,092	0.9%
Jewish	257,671	0.52%	261,282	0.49%	269,283	0.5%
Buddhist	139,046	0.28%	238,626	0.45%	262,433	0.5%
Other religion	143,811	0.29%	227,825	0.43%	332,410	0.6%
No religion	7,171,332	14.59%	13,114,232	24.74%	20,715,664	36.7%
Religion not stated	3,776,515	7.69%	3,804,104	7.18%	3,400,548	6.0%
Total population	49,138,831	100.00%	53,012,456	100.00%	56,490,048	100.0%

== See also ==
- Demographics of the United Kingdom
- Demographics of Scotland
- Demographics of Wales
- Demographics of Northern Ireland
- Demographics of London
- Demographics of Birmingham
- Demographics of Greater Manchester
- United Kingdom Census 2011
- National Statistics Socio-economic Classification
- Census 2001 Ethnic Codes
- List of English districts by population
- List of urban areas in England by population
- List of towns and cities in England by historical population
- List of major settlements by population in English counties
