= Irish in Britain =

British charity and membership network

- Formation: 1973
- Type: Charity
- Purpose: Membership network for Irish organisations in Britain
- Location: Haringey Irish Centre, London, United Kingdom
- Chair: Darren Murphy
- CEO: Brian Dalton
- Website: www.irishinbritain.org

Irish in Britain is a charity and national membership network founded in 1973 for Irish community groups throughout Britain. Originally established as the Federation of Irish Societies and rebranded in 2013 as Irish in Britain, the organisation has a membership of over 100 Irish charities, societies and groups. The activities of the membership range from welfare, housing, support and advice services to cultural activities, sports, arts, music, theatre and language. Irish in Britain provides member support services and has a strategic role in representing issues common to its membership and the wider diaspora.

Irish in Britain works closely with the All-Party Parliamentary Group on Ireland and the Irish in Britain. It also coordinates campaigns, including Green Hearts, which raises awareness about heart disease in the community, and Cuimhne – the Irish memory loss campaign.

== History ==
At the Irish Centre in Camden in June 1973, two community networks – the Federation of Irish Societies Northern Region and Southern Region – agreed to amalgamate into one Federation. The Southern Region group had its roots going back to 1950 and was first proposed by Portsmouth Irish Society. The Northern Region group represented organisations from Manchester, Merseyside and Tyneside. Tommy Walsh of the Liverpool Irish Centre was elected the first national chairman.

== All-Party Parliamentary Group on Ireland and the Irish in Britain ==
The All-Party Parliamentary Group (APPG) on Ireland was founded in the late 1990s in the context of the Northern Ireland peace process by parliamentarians with an interest in Irish affairs. Since its establishment, the APPG has worked closely with Irish in Britain. The APPG's current chair is Labour MP Conor McGinn, who represents St Helens North and is originally from County Armagh. The Vice-Chairs are Mark Logan (Conservative), Martin Docherty-Hughes (SNP), Baroness Harris of Richmond (Liberal Democrat) and Karin Smyth (Labour). Former chairs include Ruane and Kevin McNamara. Irish in Britain acts as secretariat to the parliamentary group, consulting on the agenda and organising relevant documents and minutes.

== Campaigns ==
=== Vaccine Le Chéile/Together ===
Irish in Britain initiated their COVID-19 ‘Vaccine Le Chéile’ (meaning 'Together) campaign in January 2022. The aim of the campaign is to provide Irish people and their networks living in Britain with evidence-based information to enable them to make positive informed choices and is supplemented by a wider digital campaign to build awareness, to educate and expand opportunities for information and support.

The most recent element of this campaign is that Irish in Britain are offering to help support member organisations in hosting a pop-up vaccination centre. It is hoped that this will make COVID-19 vaccinations more accessible to the local community and in turn, will increase the vaccination numbers among the Irish population of Britain.

=== Census ===
The organisation led the successful campaign to secure 'White Irish' as a category in the 2001 UK census, as previous censuses estimated the size of the Irish community solely on those born in Ireland. The Office of National Statistics was urged to introduce an Irish category and the Federation won the support of many parliamentarians. To advertise the new category in the community, the Federation launched a 'Be Irish, Be Counted' campaign. This was followed in the lead up to the 2011 census with a 'How Irish Are You' initiative.

Irish in Britain continue their work on this by covering information relating to the 2021 UK Census (and 2022 Scotland Census when it becomes available).

=== Cuimhne - the Irish memory loss alliance ===
Cuimhne, the Irish for 'memory', supports family carers and individuals who may have some form of memory loss or dementia.

The organisation's Cuimhne (pronounced ‘queevna’) campaign is a call for action to everyone, from individuals to organisations both within the Irish in Britain network and beyond. The aim of the campaign is to involve and include people living with memory loss and dementia with their carers in our society and to work together to promote awareness of memory loss and create a friendly community for everyone.

The campaign focuses on enabling communities to be socially inclusive of people suffering from memory loss. The assistance focuses on utilising simple measures that can be taken collectively to enable those with memory loss to remain independent and engaged with local communities and services.

=== Green Hearts ===
The Green Hearts campaign was originally developed in response to the higher than average cardio–related mortality rates experienced by Irish people in Britain. The campaign is centred on a collaborative community approach towards improving health outcomes and the well-being of the Irish community and promoting a positive message around prevention and early detection.

== Research bibliography ==
Irish in Britain offers a free to access bibliography of works relating to the Irish community in Britain. It can be accessed on their website, here.

== See also ==
- Irish migration to Britain
