= National Statistics Socio-economic Classification =

Official UK socio-economic classification

The National Statistics Socio-economic Classification (often abbreviated to NS-SEC) is the official socio-economic classification in the United Kingdom. It is an adaptation of the Goldthorpe schema which was first known as the Nuffield Class Schema developed in the 1970s. It was developed using the Standard Occupational Classification 1990 (SOC90) and rebased on the Standard Occupational Classification 2000 (SOC2000) before its first major use on the 2001 UK census. The NS-SEC replaced two previous social classifications: Socio-economic Groups (SEG) and Social Class based on Occupation (SC, formerly known as Registrar General's Social Class, RGSC). The NS-SEC was rebased on the Standard Occupational Classification 2010 prior to the 2011 UK census and it will be further rebased on the new Standard Occupational Classification 2020 for use on the 2021 UK census.

The NS-SEC is a nested classification. It has 14 operational categories, with some sub-categories, and is commonly used in eight-class, five-class, and three-class versions. Only the three-category version is intended to represent any form of hierarchy. The version intended for most users (the analytic version) has eight classes:

1. Higher managerial and professional occupations
2. Lower managerial and professional occupations
3. Intermediate occupations (clerical, sales, service)
4. Small employers and own account workers
5. Lower supervisory and technical occupations
6. Semi-routine occupations
7. Routine occupations
8. Never worked or long-term unemployed

The three-class version is reduced to following:

1. Higher occupations
2. Intermediate occupations
3. Lower occupations

== See also ==
- ACORN (demographics)
- NRS social grade
