= Ethnicity & Health =

- Discipline: Healthcare, public health, nursing, medicine
- Language: English
- Edited by: Keith E. Whitfield, Tamara A. Baker, Sarah Szanton

Publication details
- History: 1996-present
- Publisher: Taylor & Francis
- Frequency: Bimonthly
- Impact factor: 1.766 (2017)

Standard abbreviations
- ISO 4: Ethn. Health

Indexing
- CODEN: ETHEFR
- ISSN: 1355-7858 (print); 1465-3419 (web)
- LCCN: 2014203063
- OCLC no.: 302291665

Links
- Journal homepage; Online access

Ethnicity & Health is a bimonthly peer-reviewed medical journal covering the relationship between ethnicity and health. It publishes papers pertaining to this topic in numerous different disciplines, including epidemiology, public health, medicine, and the social sciences. The editor-in-chief is Tamara A. Baker (University of Kansas). According to the Journal Citation Reports, the journal has a 2017 impact factor of 1.766.
