= White people in the United Kingdom =

Racial and multi-ethnic group

- Geographic distribution of White people in the United Kingdom (2011)

Total population
- United Kingdom: 55,592,837 – 83% (2021/22 Census); England: 45,783,401 – 81.00% (2021); Scotland: 5,051,875 – 92.87% (2022); Wales: 2,915,848 – 93.70% (2021); Northern Ireland: 1,841,713 – 96.76% (2021)

Languages
- British English · Hiberno-English · Polish · Romanian · Bulgarian · Welsh · Angloromani · Beurla Reagaird · Cornish · French · German · Irish · Italian · Turkish · Scottish Gaelic · Shelta · Ukrainian · Russian · Albanian

Religion
- Predominantly Christianity (51.3%); minority follows other faiths (1.6%) (Note: Including Judaism (0.5%), Islam (0.5%), Buddhism (0.2%), Hinduism (0.01%) and Sikhism (0.01%)) or are irreligious (41.3%); 2021 census, NI, England and Wales only

Related ethnic groups
- White Americans · White South Africans · White Australians · White New Zealanders · Irish People · White Canadians

White people in the United Kingdom are a multi-ethnic group consisting of British residents who identify as and are perceived to be "white people." White people constitute the historical and current majority of the people living in the United Kingdom, with 83.1% of the population identifying as white in the 2021 United Kingdom census.

The Office for National Statistics designates white people into several subgroups, with small terminology variations between the administrative jurisdictions of England and Wales, Scotland and Northern Ireland. These are local: White British, White Irish, White Gypsy or Irish Traveller, and immigrant descended Other White, and in Scotland; White Polish. In Northern Ireland ethnic group data is collected differently, where only the term 'White' is used, and with National Identity ('British', 'Irish', 'Northern Irish', or combinations) collected separately.

British nationality law governs modern British citizenship and nationality, and can influence who may be defined, whether informally, in media and academia, or British Government statistics, as "white Britons" or "white British people." In censuses, millions of white people in the United Kingdom who hold British citizenship do not identify with the White British ethnicity classification, as they descended from places outside of the geographical area of the British Islands, such as Continental Europe.

Outside of the census, white people in Great Britain have been the subject of academic research, and have featured in public discourse in international and British media, in which they often are identified as a broad racial or social class within the country.

== Terminology and background ==
In the 2021 census for England and Wales, 81.7% of the population identified as White, but only 74.4% identified as "White British" (inclusive of English, Welsh, Scottish, and Northern Irish). This leaves a gap of roughly 7.3% of the total population - about 4.3 million people who identify as White but choose a different ethnic classification.

=== Census ===
Other White Population, people who identify as white persons who are not of the English, Welsh, Scottish, Roma, Irish or Irish Traveller ethnic groupings

Within the Census in the United Kingdom, the Office for National Statistics collects information on white people who are resident in the United Kingdom, regardless of citizenship status. As censuses have progressed each decade, further categories have been included to accommodate subgroupings of white people in the country. As of the 2011 census, these subgroups are White British, White Irish, White Gypsy or Irish Traveller, White Polish (in Scotland), and Other White. There are small variations between the phrasing or terminology of these categories across the administrative regions of England and Wales, Scotland and Northern Ireland.

=== Use in academia and government ===
The UK Government uses the category of white people to help define and understand demography in the country. Devolved administrations, such as the Scottish Government and Welsh Government make use of the racial category for social and equality impacts. Ministerial departments such as the Home Office and Ministry of Justice, non-ministerial, such as the Cabinet Office and office for Mayor of London, HM Inspectorate of Constabulary, and public bodies such as the Equality and Human Rights Commission, and UK Statistics Authority, have produced research and analysis on what they have defined as white persons within the country.

Academic, research and statistical organisations, such as British Election Study, NatCen Social Research and ICM Research, Savanta ComRes, define and categorise whites living in the UK, in order to study and poll respondents of all backgrounds. Think tanks, including the Policy Studies Institute, Resolution Foundation, Smith Institute and Social Issues Research Centre, utilise the grouping of white people in the United Kingdom, along with Stroke Association and Trades Union Congress.

Sociologists, social scientists, and academics of race and ethnicity, such as Peter J. Aspinall, Richard Dyer and Mary J. Hickman identify whites in Britain as an intersecting social and racial category.

==== White Irish ====
University of the West of Scotland's Chris Gilligan argues that; "The idea that White people in the United Kingdom constitute a race or ethnic group is based on racialised thinking. It works with the logic of the race relations framework, it does not challenge it." In her 2015 research, University of Southampton fellow Rosalind Willis studied the intersection of the White Irish category in England, where there have been examples of distinctions made against the White British which are culturally rejected or ignored. In this regard, professor Mary J. Hickman has written how a combination of othering the ethnic Irish, and a presupposition of the positivity of integration, has provided "tacit support for the 'myth of homogeneity' of white people in Britain".

In July 2019, the East Ham constituency Labour branch was criticised for its election of a white Irish woman as the women’s officer for its Black, Asian and Minority Ethnic (BAME) forum. The woman in question self-identified as being an ethnic minority and no objections within the branch were raised against her election. Branch secretary, Syed Taqi Shah commented that "if somebody self-declares [as BAME], and the Labour Party allows them to do so, they should be respected."

== Demographics ==
White population in total as a population pyramid in 2021 (in England and Wales)

White people are the current and historical majority of the United Kingdom's population. The 2011 United Kingdom census recorded 55,010,359 of White and 63,193 of Gypsy/Traveller/Irish Traveller ethnicity, making a total white population of 55,073,552 or 87.2 per cent of the total population. These figures did not include self-reported people of mixed ethnicity.

White population mapped in local authorities

1991 (94.65%)
Less than 45%
45 - 60%
60 - 75%
75 - 85%
85 - 90%
90 - 95%
More than 95%

2001 (92.12%)
Less than 45%
45 - 60%
60 - 75%
75 - 85%
85 - 90%
90 - 95%
More than 95%

2011 (87.17%)
Less than 45%
45 - 60%
60 - 75%
75 - 85%
85 - 90%
90 - 95%
More than 95%

=== Population in constituent nations of the United Kingdom ===
United Kingdom NUTS 1 Region's	Year											
United Kingdom NUTS 1 Region's	1971 estimations		1981 estimations		1991		2001		2011		2021	
United Kingdom NUTS 1 Region's	Number	Percentage	Number	Percentage	Number	Percentage	Number	Percentage	Number	Percentage	Number	Percentage
Northern Ireland	–	–	–	–	–	–	1,672,698	99.25%	1,779,750	98.28%	1,841,713	96.77%
Scotland	–	99.6%	4,908,140	99.1%	4,935,933	98.74%	4,960,334	97.99%	5,084,407	96.02%	5,051,875	92.9%
Wales	–	99.6%	2,788,533	99.1%	2,793,522	98.5%	2,841,505	97.9%	2,928,253	95.6%	2,915,848	94.2%
England	–	–	–	95.4%	44,144,339	93.8%	44,679,361	91%	45,281,142	85.4%	45,783,401	81%
North East England	–	99.6%	2,544,069	99%	2,507,133	98.6%	2,455,416	97.61%	2,475,567	95.32%	2,462,720	93.1%
South West England	–	–	–	–	4,546,848	98.6%	4,815,316	97.7%	5,046,429	95.41%	5,309,608	93.1%
North West England	–	98.7%	6,580,840	97.5%	6,480,131	96.3%	6,355,495	94.43%	6,361,716	90.2%	6,347,394	85.6%
Yorkshire and the Humber	–	98.1%	4,600,341	96.8%	4,622,503	95.6%	4,641,263	93.48%	4,691,956	88.8%	4,679,965	85.5%
East of England	–	99.3%	–	98.5%	4,891,675	96.8%	5,125,003	95.11%	5,310,194	90.81%	5,478,364	86.5%
East Midlands	–	98%	3,598,625	96.2%	3,765,389	95.2%	3,900,380	93.48%	4,046,356	89.26%	4,179,774	85.7%
South East England	–	–	–	–	7,271,256	96.9%	7,608,989	95.10%	7,827,820	90.65%	8,009,380	86.2%
West Midlands	–	95.9%	4,716,950	93.5%	4,725,824	91.8%	4,674,296	88.74%	4,633,669	82.7%	4,585,024	77%
Greater London	–	92.6%	5,663,496	85.7%	5,333,580	79.8%	5,103,203	71.2%	4,887,435	59.8%	4,731,172	53.8%
Overall in the United Kingdom:	–	97.5%	–	96%	51,873,794	94.5%	54,153,898	92.12%	55,073,552	87.2%	55,592,837	83.0%

=== Population in metropolitan areas ===
White population in LAD areas (2011)

Coventry

Bristol

Glasgow

Leeds

Sheffield

Slough

Bradford

Luton

Nottingham

Leicester

Birmingham

Greater Manchester

=== Population in counties ===
Greater London

Greater Manchester

West Yorkshire

West Midlands

=== Education ===
In the 1991 census, white people were recorded as the most likely group to have tertiary education. By the 2001 census, this had changed, with British African-Caribbean females, and British Indian men and women, becoming more likely to be qualified to that level.

Based on the 1994 Policy Studies Institute's NSEM survey, an International Migration Review-published study determined a factor of this shift, finding that between the ages of 21–64, 13.8% of British Hindus held a higher education, versus what the study defined as 11.3% of "White Christians" in Britain. The Welsh Government's 2007 Minority Ethnic Youth Forum Report found that, based on 2005 ONS data; "Interestingly, Chinese, Black African, Indian and Other Asian groups are more likely to have degrees than white people in the UK." In England, since 2007, out of all ethnicities aged 18 years old who have received a state education, white pupils have had the lowest rate of entry into higher education and have also seen the lowest rate of increase, from 21.8% in 2007 to 32.2% in 2022. For comparison, 70.7% of Chinese pupils and 50.6% of Black pupils gained a higher education place in the same year.

== History ==
=== British Empire ===
The history of the racial classification of white people has its roots in the establishment of European colonies in Asia, Africa and the Americas, where they encountered and lived alongside people of colour. The United Kingdom Historian Marika Sherwood writes that while there is no implication that "all whites in Britain were or became imbued with racism"; the classification of the "white race" rose in the nineteenth century due in part to the increasing rise of the eugenics and scientific racism movements of thought, with anthropologists classifying whites as distinct and separate race from other races such as Africans and Asians.

After physician John Fothergill disparagingly referred to them as "nabobs"; in 1767, the Daily Gazetteer, within the context of their return to England, made the accusation that West Indian planters (such as those involved with the East India Company) were corrupting Britain's political system, and who "being bred the tyrants of their slavish blacks, may endeavour to reduce the white [in Britain] to the same condition by an aristocracy".

=== Interwar and post-WWII periods ===
Social scientist Peter J. Aspinall has analyzed how interracial marriage in the UK, as a phenomenon, caused societal reactions from whites in the interwar, and post-World War II periods. These included violence and racism against African-American GIs, Chinese seamen, and towards children from their relationships with white women. Aspinall, an expert in ethnicity, wrote:

Such experiences were shared by interracial people, couples and families throughout the twentieth century with their mere presence provoking or exacerbating the violence of white people in Britain, as evidenced during the numerous 'race riots', disturbances and attacks that occurred throughout the period.

This post-war period of history was recognised by Mill Hill School's marking of Black History Month, when the London school published a short history of the Windrush generation, including the abuse received by arrivals such as Floella Benjamin, exploring how; "Unfortunately, many white people in Britain did not welcome the new arrivals and Floella, and many like her were faced with hatred and cruelty." Politician Enoch Powell, who became known for his anti-immigrant Rivers of Blood speech, has been identified by some media as an early source of defining white people as a racial interest group within Britain. In 1971, Powell had argued that "whites are being held back to accommodate the Asiatics and blacks".

=== Late 20th century ===
According to the ONS's quarterly Labour Force Survey, in 1993-1994 white people undertook more employer‐funded training per capita than minority groups in the UK. Analysis by economists, Michael Shields and Stephen Wheatley Price, suggested that the situation may represent a failure in United Kingdom employment equality laws. Anthony Lester, a key contributor to such legislation, stated in 1991 that "White people in Britain don't have the legacy of guilt about the past as there is in America about the period of slavery, even though there is plenty to be guilty about".

In another comparison of the two nations, while accepting that "any portrait of Britain as a haven of multicultural understanding and friendship among different groups is an exaggeration"; University of Maryland professor Eric Uslaner has observed that "the effect of segregation on civic norms is far more pronounced for whites in the United States compared to whites in Britain." Scholar Ron Walters also stressed the significance of correlation between white majorities and their behavioural patterns in the UK and US. Lecturer Clarence Lusane has written of Walter's use of themes, such as the "cultural similarity with regard to racial attitudes of Whites in Britain and the United States" and also, "the reception by the White host societies" towards black communities.

=== 21st century ===
The 2008 BBC series White attempted to address issues of white-related class and race issues in the country. Academic Vron Ware described the documentary as "a provocative series that claimed to address the marginality of working class white people in Britain." Based on data from eligible voters, white people overall voted to leave the European Union in 2016's Brexit referendum in higher proportions than other racial groups in the country.

== Culture and society ==
University of Essex professor Richard Berthoud has proposed that between 1970 and 2000, white families in Britain progressed towards modern individualism, and away from other traditional behaviours.

=== Alcohol and smoking ===
Based on a 243-person study (103 whites, 83 British Pakistanis, and 57 British Indians) in Bradford, England in 1988, white people had higher rates of drinking and smoking than Asian British people. This correlated with a study around 30 years later, which found that alcohol consumption is higher among whites in Britain than other groups. In 2017 the Mayor of London office published that; "51 per cent of ethnic minorities, and 16 per cent of white people, in Britain in 2017 had not consumed alcohol in the last week." A 2018 Stroke Association report also found that white people had the highest levels of alcohol consumption and smoking in the UK. White people in England are more likely to drink at levels classed as 'hazardous, harmful or dependent' than all other ethnic groups.

=== Integration and representations ===
White people are usually defined, in scholarly works and media, as the majority group in the country. It is not always clear whether majority-based terminology is dependent on cultural perceptions, statistics (such as ONS censuses and UK Statistics Authority's Citizenship Surveys) or a combination of multiple factors. The scope of the term of white people, or reference to a white majority within the UK, is sometimes a source of debate or controversy. For example, Richard Dyer's work, an academic who specialises in racial representations, suggests the ethnicity of white people in Britain is rarely scrutinised.

There have been social challenges to integration, and adjustment to multiculturalism, in the United Kingdom among the white population. A study conducted by NatCen Social Research asked whites in the UK a number of questions, including: "Do you think most white people in Britain would mind/would you mind if a close relative were to marry a person of black or West Indian/Asian origin?" The results found that between 1983 and 2013, the white participants' opinions on "white people in Britain" dropped from around 80% 'would mind' to under 60%, and their personal opinions moved from around 60% to just over 30%. A publicly-funded Citizenship Survey found that 56 per cent of "Whites in Britain" had friendships exclusively with other white people. Based on analysis of the Citizenship Survey, academics Anthony Heath and Yaojun Li wrote:

[I]t is in fact the whites who are by far the most likely to have friends only from their own race - that is other whites. Given the much larger number of whites in Britain, and the geographical concentration of ethnic minorities in large conurbations, many whites will not have opportunity to meet ethnic minorities.

A 1982 study of riots in the UK in India Quarterly, outlined what it described as a "substantial displacement of the local whites in Britain." The journal suggested that "this has occurred in certain areas like Birmingham, Brixton, Manchester, Southall, Toxteth, Wolverhampton", and that "to a great extent this clustering has hampered the assimilation process." After the 1991 United Kingdom census, newspaper The Independent reported: "Yet Britain as a whole remains very white indeed; there is nothing "multicultural" about it. At the census in 1991, ethnic minorities came to about 5.5 per cent of the population: that is, just over three million in a total population of almost 55 million."

In 2000, The Observer reported the demographic prediction that white people would become a minority group in all or certain parts of the UK, while remaining the largest singular group (which is sometimes defined as a majority minority scenario). Governmental advisor, Lee Jasper, stated that "the demographics show that white people in London will become a minority by 2010", and that 'We could have a majority black Britain by the turn of the century." Runnymede Trust, a leading British race equality think tank, published criticism which took issue with assumptions of future birth rates, and an "inadequacy" in the "use of the term 'whites'."

A 2010 Ethnic and Racial Studies study, which analyzed UK and US census data, showed that Black people in Britain were more likely to have a UK born White partner or spouse than their US counterparts. With regard to censuses, the White British category has, at times, been the focus of demography (above other groupings, such as White Irish) particularly in journalistic media. In 2012, The Telegraph reported that the percentage reduction in white people recorded at the 2011 census had occurred "despite an influx" of White Polish people.

=== Groups ===
- White British

Other White

- Albanians in the United Kingdom
- Austrians in the United Kingdom
- Baltic people in the United Kingdom
- Bulgarians in the United Kingdom
- Czechs in the United Kingdom
- Dutch people in the United Kingdom
- French people in the United Kingdom
- Germans in the United Kingdom
- Greeks in the United Kingdom
- Hungarians in the United Kingdom
- Italians in the United Kingdom
- Kosovans in the United Kingdom
- Poles in the United Kingdom
- Portuguese in the United Kingdom
- Romanians in the United Kingdom
- Russians in the United Kingdom
- Scandinavian migration to Britain
- Serbs in the United Kingdom
- Slovenes in the United Kingdom
- South Africans in the United Kingdom
- Spaniards in the United Kingdom
- Swedes in the United Kingdom
- Turks in the United Kingdom
- Ukrainians in the United Kingdom

== Social and political issues ==
=== Employment and housing ===
A 2005 Smith Institute report on migration noted that income, and employment rates, of "British-born white individuals" and "foreign-born whites" were similar in the United Kingdom, and diverged almost inseparably in comparison with "non-white immigrants". According to the Social Issues Research Centre, there is still, however, significant diversity within the white populace in terms of income. In 2008, the Oxford-based institute also reported that whites experienced half the rates of low income households as do ethnic minorities. In 2009, writing for a Runnymede Trust publication, University of Iceland researcher Kjartan Sveinsson wrote:

Feigning white working-class disadvantage as an ethnic disadvantage rather than as class disadvantage is exactly what rhetorically places this group in direct competition with minority ethnic groups. As such, it does little to address the real and legitimate grievances poor white people in Britain have.

Between 2012 and 2013, the Equality and Human Rights Commission found that white people were far less likely to live in poverty, compared with what the report defined as "Ethnic minority people". Trades Union Congress research in 2017, which was analyzed by the Scottish Government, showed that white people had higher rates of general employment and less chance of insecure employment, such as seasonal or agency work, than other racial groups in the Britain. A 2019 study found that on income-related demography, British Indians are the only census-based ethnic group with similar earnings to white people in the UK.

White people in the United Kingdom have the lowest rates of household crowding, with two per cent of the population experiencing it.

=== Discrimination ===
White people face less discrimination in the United Kingdom than ethnic minorities. For example, European Network Against Racism notes that white people in the country are around six times less likely than black people, and half as likely as Asians, to be stopped by police. The British Election Study has defined "white people" in Britain, as part of a poll of 2,049 ethnic minority respondents regarding opinions on equal opportunity in British society.

The Centre for Economic Performance revealed in a 2014 study that "Many white people in the UK feel that social landlords actively discriminate against them in favour of immigrants and ethnic minorities." Analyzing this trend, professor Alan Manning found "no basis in reality for this perceived discrimination". Mona Chalabi, a notable data journalist, writing in 2015, suggested that while racism from white people in the UK has a greater significance than from ethnic minorities; "a lot of other white people in Britain genuinely believe racism affects them too". Journalist Simon Kelner has stated a similar view, posing the question "Can white people in Britain really feel they're the victims of racism?"

In 2016, the Ministry of Justice issued a report noting that "white people in Britain" were four times less likely to be in prison than black Britons. In 2017, HM Inspectorate of Constabulary found by studying England and Wales data that; "White people in the United Kingdom are more likely to be carrying drugs when stopped by police but less likely to be stopped, compared to black people who are disproportionately searched". Between 2017 and 2018, Home Office data revealed that Dorset was the county where police were least likely to question white people in comparison with ethnic minority groups. Whites had around 17 times less chance of being subjected to Stop and Search.

In a 2018 ICM Research poll conducted between 2013 and 2018, 4% of white people in the United Kingdom believed they had been treated like a shoplifter; 9% asked to leave an establishment for what seemed like no good reason; 18% believed they had been unfairly overlooked for a job; 52% felt a stranger was rude or abusive to them. (The results were 47% (treated like shoplifter), 25% (asked to leave), 43% (overlooked for job), and 69% (received abuse), respectively, for members of the BAME community). A 2019 United Nations Human Rights Council report noted that the Cabinet Office's Race Disparity Unit had number of findings in relation to racism, including that; "One of the primary discoveries made through the audit had been that ethnic minorities were worse off than white people in the United Kingdom." In 2020, a CNN and Savanta ComRes survey revealed that, among many other findings, that around half of white people in the country believed there was a fair representation of ethnic minorities in film and television (while 17 per cent of black British people agreed). Whites were also twice as likely to say they had been treated with respect by British police.

In a 1995 study, sociologist Jock Young found that of 1000 randomly selected residents of Finsbury Park when asked if they had been stopped by the police over the past year, the White Irish population was disproportionately affected with 14.3%, in contrast to 12.8% of Black Caribbean and 5.8% of White British people. The researchers found the Police tactic of 'lurking and larking', whereby constables would wait outside Irish pubs and clubs to make arrests to be to blame for the high statistics, which was labelled a form of 'institutional racism'.

=== Health ===
1983 research of breast cancer rates in Birmingham, England found that whites in the United Kingdom had significantly higher rates of the disease than black and Asian people who had migrated to the country. The study examined white people who were born in either the UK or Republic of Ireland. A 1999 study revealed that white people in the country had lower mortality rates from stroke than black people.

In 2007, professor Andrew Hattersley studied the genomes of whites in the United Kingdom (as well as Finland and Italy), discovering what some researchers described as the first clear genetic link, via the FTO gene, to obesity. Presence of the gene beyond that initial subject pool was not yet studied.

White people are the most likely racial group to have a form of atrial fibrillation conditions. The same 2018 data also showed that whites were around half as likely to suffer a stroke than black people in Britain. Among a number of other disparities, 2019 research demonstrated that whites in Britain were prescribed antipsychotic drugs (as dementia treatment) for around 4 weeks less on average than black Britons, placing the latter into an excess of dosage recommendations.

Research published in 2022, found that white people in England are more likely to develop cancer than black, mixed and Asian ethnic groups. Overall, compared to the white population, cancer rates were 40% lower in those of mixed-heritage, 38% lower in Asian people and 4% lower in black people. Generally, whites in England and Wales are more likely to die of cancer than their black or Asian counterparts.

Analysis published in 2023 comparing the risk of dying by suicide across sociodemographic groups in England and Wales reveal suicide rates were highest in the white (and mixed) ethnic groups for both men and women. White people in England are also more likely to have self-harmed than people from the Asian, mixed and black ethnic groups.

White people are less likely to die from COVID-19 than any other racial group in the United Kingdom. White people in the country had half the chance of dying of the virus when compared with black Britons, while British Chinese showed similar fatality rates to white people. White males were at just under half the risk of men of British Bangladeshi and British Pakistanis ancestry. A British government report confirms that Black and Asian people in Britain had higher death rates amid the COVID-19 pandemic than their white counterparts. Despite the effects of COVID-19, whites in England and Wales have a higher overall mortality rate than any other ethnicity. Whites in England and Wales have a lower life expectancy at birth than nearly all other ethnic groups.

A 2009 study published in Ethnicity & Health demonstrated that the White Irish people self-reported higher rates of poor general health than the White British populace. This was found to be particularly the case in Northern Ireland, for those who had designated themselves as White, and with an "Irish" national identity. In 2020, a UCL study based in NHS England data, showed that the White Irish group was around 50 per cent less at risk of death from COVID-19 than other black, Asian and minority ethnic (BAME) groups. This was significantly lower than the White British group, which were 12 per cent lower than the average risk for BAME communities.

=== Voting ===
==== 2024 ====
Breakdown of vote in Great Britain into affiliates (%) by demographic
Category	Lab.	Con.	Ref.	LD	Grn	SNP/PC	Others	Margin
All	35	24	15	13	7	4	3	11
Ethnic group
White	33	26	16	13	6	4	2	7

==== 2019 ====
The 2019 UK general election vote in Great Britain
Social group	% Con	% Lab	% Lib Dem	% Others	% Lead
Total vote	45	33	12	10	12
Ethnic group
White	48	29	12	11	19

==== 2017 ====
The 2017 UK general election vote in Great Britain
Social group	Con	Lab	Lib Dem	UKIP	Others	Lead
Total vote	44	41	8	2	5	3
Ethnic group
White	45	39	8	2	6	6

==== 2015 ====
The 2015 UK General Election vote in Great Britain
Social group	Con	Lab	UKIP	Lib Dem	Green	Others	Lead
Total vote	38	31	13	8	4	6	7
Ethnic group
White	39	28	14	8	4	7	11

==== 2010 ====
The 2010 UK general election vote in Great Britain
Social group	Con	Lab	Lib Dem	Others	Lead
Total vote	37	30	24	19	7
Ethnic group
White	38	28	24	8	11

== See also ==
- White British
- Ethnic groups in the United Kingdom
- Demographics of the United Kingdom
- White demographic decline
