= Other White =

Classification of ethnicity in the United Kingdom

- Distribution by District (2011)

Total population
- United Kingdom: 4,009,940 – 6.0% (2021/22 Census); England: 3,585,003 – 6.3% (2021); Scotland: 254,336 – 4.7% (2022) (Note: Includes the White Polish ethnic category (90,736) alongside the 'Other White' ethnic category (163,600) to ensure consistent comparisons with other constituent countries); Wales: 82,994 – 2.7% (2021); Northern Ireland: 87,607 – 4.6% (2021)

Regions with significant populations
- London; Edinburgh; Birmingham; West Northamptonshire; Bristol; Glasgow; Leeds; Manchester

Languages
- British English, Polish, Romanian, Italian

Religion
- Predominantly Christianity (60.4%); minority follows other faiths (6.0%) (Note: Including Islam (3.5%), Judaism (1.3%), Buddhism (0.3%), Hinduism (0.04%), Sikhism (0.02%), Alevism and others) or are irreligious (25.3%); 2021 census, England and Wales only (Note: Figures include Other White as well as 'Gypsy or Irish Traveller' or 'Roma')

Related ethnic groups
- White British

The term Other White, or White Other, is a classification of ethnicity in the United Kingdom, used in documents such as the 2021 United Kingdom Census, to describe people who identify as white persons who are not of the English, Welsh, Scottish, Romani, Irish or Irish Traveller ethnic groupings. In Scotland, the term Other White is also used to refer collectively to those not of Scottish or Other British ethnicity, in which case it also includes those of a Romani, Irish or Irish Traveller background.

The category does not comprise a single ethnic group; rather, it serves a means of identification for white individuals not represented by other white census categories. Consequently, the Other White group encompasses a diverse range of people, and includes those born in Britain and those born elsewhere.

According to the 2021 United Kingdom census, those identifying as Other White in England & Wales enumerated 3,667,997, or 6.2% of the population. The largest represented ethnic groups in the Other White category were Poles (614,000 people) and Romanians (343,000 people). In Scotland, the largest represented ethnic groups classed as Other White were Poles (61,000 people) and Irish (54,000 people).

In 2011, the Scottish Government introduced the category White Polish as a means of identifying the Polish diaspora in Scotland.

Along with White British and White Irish, the Other White category does not appear in Northern Ireland, where only one "White" classification was presented to respondents.

== Demographics ==
Other White population by region and country
| Region / Country | Population | Per cent of region |
|---|---|---|
| United Kingdom | 4,009,940 | 6.0% |
| England | 3,585,003 | 6.35% |
| Greater London | 1,290,838 | 14.67% |
| South East | 586,569 | 6.32% |
| East of England | 429,599 | 6.78% |
| East Midlands | 258,438 | 5.30% |
| South West | 257,594 | 4.52% |
| North West | 253,487 | 3.42% |
| West Midlands | 248,565 | 4.18% |
| Yorkshire and The Humber | 208,130 | 3.80% |
| North East | 51,783 | 1.96% |
| Scotland (Note: Scotland held its census a year later after England and Wales due to the COVID-19 pandemic. As a result, the data shown is from 2022 as opposed to 2021.) | 254,336 | 4.68% |
| Northern Ireland | 87,607 | 4.60% |
| Wales | 82,994 | 2.67% |
Figures based on the 2021 United Kingdom Census

Population pyramid of Other Whites in 2021 (in England and Wales)

=== Birthplace ===
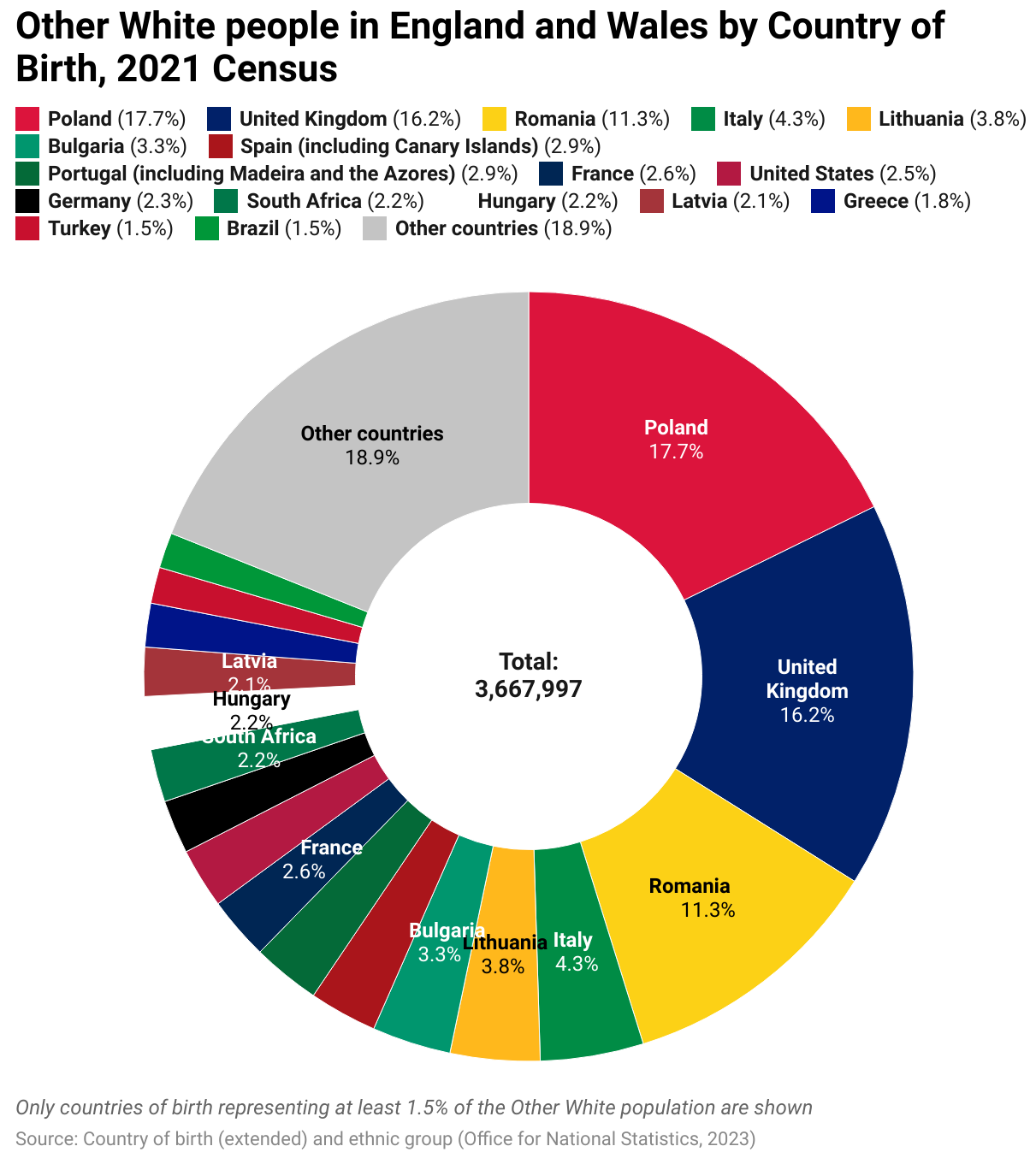
Country of birth (2021 census, England and Wales)

Year of arrival (2021 census, England and Wales)
1. Born in the UK (16.2%)
2. Before 1950 (0.20%)
3. 1951 to 1960 (0.70%)
4. 1961 to 1970 (1.30%)
5. 1971 to 1980 (1.40%)
6. 1981 to 1990 (1.90%)
7. 1991 to 2000 (6.10%)
8. 2001 to 2010 (25.2%)
9. 2011 to 2021 (47.0%)

According to 2016 ONS Estimates, Other Whites enumerated 4,167,000, or 6.3% of the population in the United Kingdom. However, their numbers, in line with a slight population decline in Polish and Romanian citizens in Britain, fell to 3,667,997 in England & Wales at the 2021 United Kingdom census.

In the 2001 UK Census, the majority of people living in England and Wales ticking the 'Other White' ethnic group specified their ethnicity as European. Four out of five of the 'Other White' category (i.e. not British or Irish) were born overseas. A third were born in a Western European country other than the UK, and one in seven were born in an Eastern European country.

Outside of Europe, countries derived from former British colonies such as Canada, Australia, New Zealand, South Africa and the United States were among the top ten birthplaces (which included the UK itself). This suggested that, in 2001, significant numbers of Canadian Britons, Australian Briton, New Zealand Britons, American Britons and South African Britons, such as those born abroad to British parents and returned to the UK as minors, identified as White Other. It may also be that those who identify as white Canadians, white Australians, white New Zealanders, white Americans or white South Africans have migrated to the country as adults.

=== Religion ===
| Religion | England and Wales | | | |
| Religion | 2011 | | 2021 | |
| Religion | Number | % | Number | % |
|---|---|---|---|---|
| Christianity | 1,617,833 | 65.08% | 2,202,595 | 60.05% |
| No religion | 464,911 | 18.70% | 933,703 | 25.46% |
| Islam | 131,056 | 5.27% | 131,425 | 3.58% |
| Judaism | 39,319 | 1.58% | 49,125 | 1.34% |
| Buddhism | 9,275 | 0.37% | 9,658 | 0.26% |
| Hinduism | 4,740 | 0.19% | 1,368 | 0.04% |
| Sikhism | 1,795 | 0.07% | 607 | 0.02% |
| Other religions | 11,749 | 0.47% | 31,925 | 0.87% |
| Not Stated | 205,134 | 8.25% | 307,587 | 8.39% |

== Society ==
=== Economic status ===
The Other White group is largely of working age, with only one in ten aged over 65 and one in seven under 16 at the time of the 2001 census. This does vary according to the stated country of birth, with people born in the UK being disproportionately young. Polish and Italian respondents had a larger proportion of over 65s, which reflects the migration of Poles and Italians to Britain after the Second World War.

In 2019, the Other White group had a median hourly pay of £11.54 (8% less than the White British group).

In 2021, the Other White group had an employment rate of 82% - the highest in England, Scotland and Wales.

According to a 2022 Civitas report, Other White citizens have average wealth or assets of £53,200.

| Ethnic group | Individual median wealth |
|---|---|
| White British | £166,700 |
| Indian | £144,400 |
| Black Caribbean | £85,000 |
| Chinese | £67,300 |
| White Other | £53,200 |
| Pakistani | £52,000 |
| Bangladeshi | £22,800 |
| Black African | £18,100 |

== Detailed breakdown ==
| Ethnic group within the White Other Group (in England and Wales) | 2021 | |
| Ethnic group within the White Other Group (in England and Wales) | Population | % |
|---|---|---|
| White: European Mixed | 646,118 | 1.1 |
| White: Polish | 614,344 | 1.0 |
| White: Romanian | 342,651 | 0.6 |
| White: Other White, White unspecified | 211,287 | 0.4 |
| White: Other Eastern European | 166,179 | 0.3 |
| White: Italian | 148,661 | 0.2 |
| White: Lithuanian | 97,217 | 0.2 |
| White: Portuguese | 93,608 | 0.2 |
| White: Bulgarian | 89,546 | 0.2 |
| White: North American | 82,985 | 0.1 |
| White: Spanish | 81,150 | 0.1 |
| White: French | 78,502 | 0.1 |
| White: Greek | 73,719 | 0.1 |
| White: German | 66,174 | 0.1 |
| White: Hungarian | 65,697 | 0.1 |
| White: Australian/New Zealander | 61,172 | 0.1 |
| White: Turkish | 61,102 | 0.1 |
| White: South African | 57,648 | 0.1 |
| White: Latvian | 48,070 | 0.1 |
| White: Russian | 44,662 | 0.1 |
| White: Albanian | 40,879 | 0.1 |
| White: Slovak | 36,936 | 0.1 |
| White: Jewish | 34,105 | 0.1 |
| White: Hispanic or Latin American | 32,335 | 0.1 |
| White: Greek Cypriot | 29,472 | 0.0 |
| White: Czech | 25,023 | 0.0 |
| White: Brazilian | 24,221 | 0.0 |
| White: Dutch | 23,721 | 0.0 |
| White: Any other ethnic group | 22,309 | 0.0 |
| White: Other Mixed | 21,092 | 0.0 |
| White: Mixed Irish | 20,278 | 0.0 |
| White: White African | 20,273 | 0.0 |
| White: Ukrainian | 16,297 | 0.0 |
| White: Swedish | 16,132 | 0.0 |
| White: Kosovan | 13,145 | 0.0 |
| White: Danish | 9,453 | 0.0 |
| White: Turkish Cypriot | 9,398 | 0.0 |
| White: Serbian | 7,906 | 0.0 |
| White: Finnish | 7,892 | 0.0 |
| White: Belgian | 7,576 | 0.0 |
| White: Iranian | 7,356 | 0.0 |
| White: Swiss | 7,005 | 0.0 |
| White: Croatian | 6,995 | 0.0 |
| White: Norwegian | 6,814 | 0.0 |
| White: South American | 6,600 | 0.0 |
| White: Other Middle East | 6,527 | 0.0 |
| White: Cypriot (part not stated) | 5,956 | 0.0 |
| White: Austrian | 5,825 | 0.0 |
| White: Estonian | 5,147 | 0.0 |
| White: Kurdish | 5,091 | 0.0 |
| White: Maltese | 4,971 | 0.0 |
| White: Arab | 3,931 | 0.0 |
| White: Armenian | 3,807 | 0.0 |
| White: Slovenian | 3,719 | 0.0 |
| White: White Caribbean | 3,469 | 0.0 |
| White: Macedonian | 3,446 | 0.0 |
| White: Other North African | 3,375 | 0.0 |
| White: Moldovan | 3,207 | 0.0 |
| White: Mixed White | 2,991 | 0.0 |
| White: Israeli | 2,981 | 0.0 |
| White: African unspecified | 2,805 | 0.0 |
| White: Bosnian | 2,633 | 0.0 |
| White: Belarusian | 2,522 | 0.0 |
| White: Argentinian | 2,156 | 0.0 |
| White: Georgian | 2,149 | 0.0 |
| White: White and North African or Middle Eastern | 2,035 | 0.0 |
| White: Colombian | 1,976 | 0.0 |
| White: Zimbabwean | 1,803 | 0.0 |
| White: Algerian | 1,776 | 0.0 |

Other White ethnic groups with above 50,000 population as population pyramids in 2021

White European Mixed

White Polish

White Romanian

White Italian

White German

White: Other White or White Unspecified

White Greek

White Australian+New Zealander

White Hungarian

White Turkish

White Spanish

White South African

White Bulgarian

White North American

White French

White Portuguese

White Lithuanians

== See also ==
- Albanians in the United Kingdom
- Americans in the United Kingdom
- Armenians in the United Kingdom
- Australians in the United Kingdom
- Austrians in the United Kingdom
- Azerbaijanis in the United Kingdom
- Baltic people in the United Kingdom
- Brazilians in the United Kingdom
- Bulgarians in the United Kingdom
- Canadians in the United Kingdom
- Classification of ethnicity in the United Kingdom
- Czechs in the United Kingdom
- Cypriots in the United Kingdom
- Dutch people in the United Kingdom
- British Jews
- Germans in the United Kingdom
- Greeks in the United Kingdom
- Hungarians in the United Kingdom
- Italians in the United Kingdom
- History of the Jews in the United Kingdom
- Kosovans in the United Kingdom
- New Zealanders in the United Kingdom
- Poles in the United Kingdom
- Portuguese in the United Kingdom
- Romanians in the United Kingdom
- Russians in the United Kingdom
- Scandinavian migration to Britain
- Serbs in the United Kingdom
- Slovenes in the United Kingdom
- South Africans in the United Kingdom
- Spaniards in the United Kingdom
- Swedes in the United Kingdom
- Turkish people in the United Kingdom
