= Saint John the Baptist Serbian Orthodox Church (Halifax) =

Serbian Orthodox church in Halifax, United Kingdom

Coordinates: 53.7354°N 1.8654°W

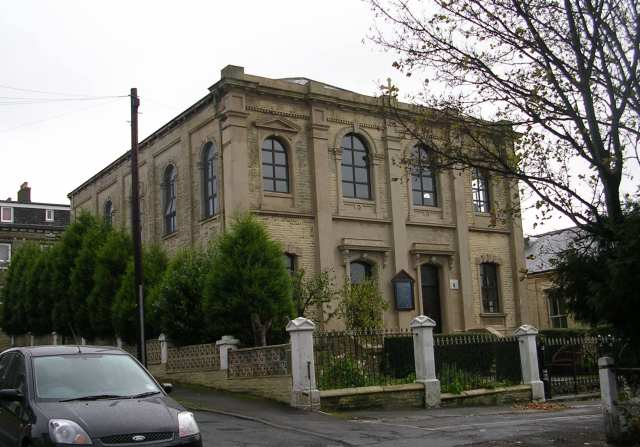
- Saint John the Baptist Serbian Orthodox Church, pictured in 2007
- Saint John the Baptist Serbian Orthodox Church
- Location: Heap Street, Boothtown, Halifax, West Yorkshire HX3 6JE
- Denomination: Serbian Orthodox Church

History
- Consecrated: 1871 (Wesleyan Methodist Church); 1965 (Serbian Orthodox Church)

Administration
- Diocese: Serbian Orthodox Eparchy of Britain and Ireland

The Saint John the Baptist Serbian Orthodox Church (Serbian: Српска православна црква светог Јована Крститеља, romanized: Srpska pravoslavna crkva svetog Jovana Krstitelja) is an Eastern Orthodox church located in Boothtown area of Halifax, West Yorkshire, England. It is under jurisdiction of the Serbian Orthodox Eparchy of Britain and Ireland of the Serbian Orthodox Church and is dedicated to Saint John the Baptist.

== History ==
There has been a Serb community in the area since the 1940s, when Serbian POWs and anti-Communist refugees from German camps arrived in Halifax in 1947. They needed a place to worship and were given a former Methodist chapel in Simpson Street to worship in. Closed in the 1950s, it was acquired by the Serbian Orthodox Church in 1952. The building, which had already deteriorated, was repaired and renovated, and was consecrated on 26 September 1954.

In 1963, a split emerged in the Serbian Orthodox community in the United Kingdom and in the United States, between those who believed that the Belgrade central hierarchy of the Church was too much influenced by the Communist government there, and others who believed that they must adhere to the official Church hierarchy in Belgrade, regardless of the political complexion of the Government there. This dichotomy was exacerbated in 1964 when the Serbian Orthodox bishop in the United States was removed from office by Belgrade, and the groups formally split. After the split, those who recognised the authority of Belgrade remained at Simpson Street, but were much reduced in numbers.

In the early 1970s, that group moved to join a Serbian Church in Bradford and the Simpson Street site ceased to be a church.

The larger part of the Halifax Serb community followed the anti-communist line and established their own separate Church with links to a body in the United States known collectively there as The Free Serbian Orthodox Church.

In 1965, the former Akroydon Wesleyan Methodist Church and Sunday School in Boothtown, were bought by this group. The main Church building was adapted for their style of worship with a new Social Centre created on the lower floor. The church had been built in 1871 as a Methodist church and was abandoned in 1964, when the Methodists moved to Boothtown United Methodist Chapel nearby.

The interior of the church was adapted, by financial input and renovation work, to accommodate Orthodox Christian services. His Majesty King Peter II Karađorđević attended the formal consecration of the church by bishop Dionisije Milivojević on 5 September 1965. The property has two function halls, a car park and a vicarage. The parish priest is the Very Reverend Protopresbyter-Stavrophore Aleksandar Ilić.

== See also ==
- Serbian Orthodox Eparchy of Britain and Ireland
- Serbs in the United Kingdom
