= Austrians Abroad =

Map of the Austrian diaspora in the world (includes people with Austrian ancestry or citizenship). Austria + 100,000 + 10,000 + 1,000

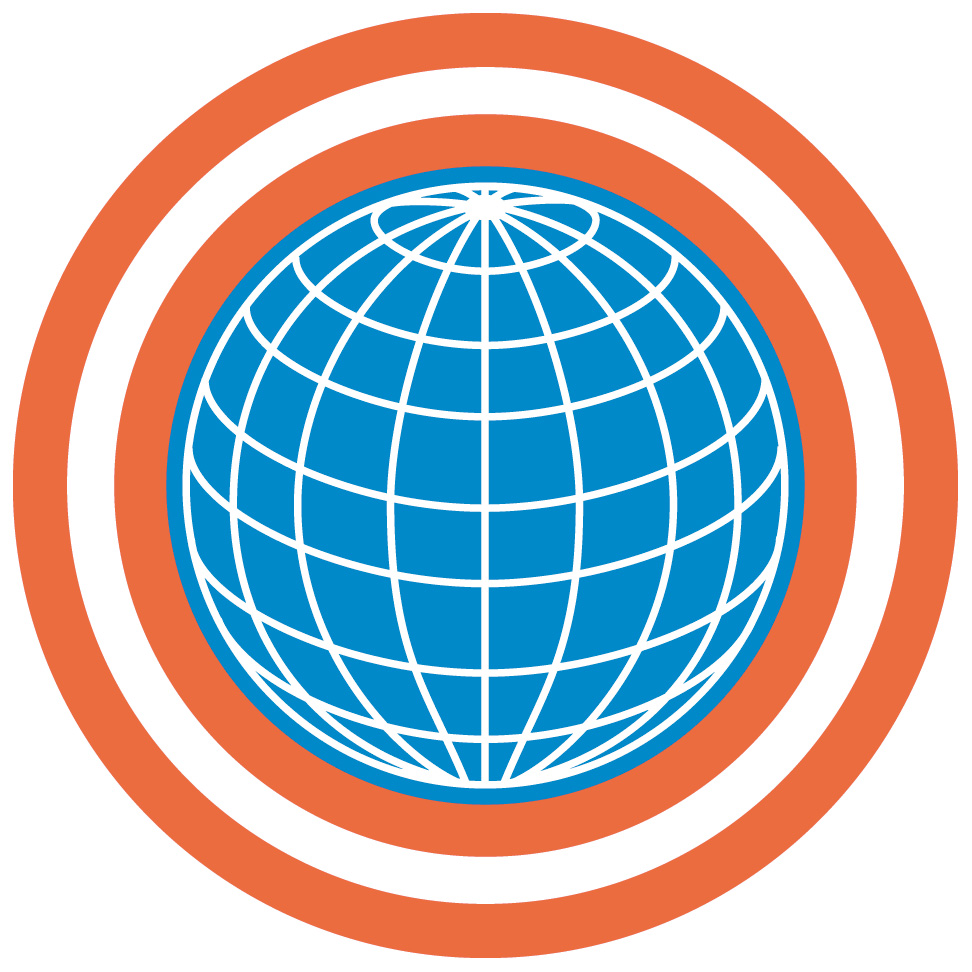
The logo of the World Federation of Austrians Abroad

Austrians Abroad (German: Auslandsösterreicher) are Austrian citizens, migrants and expatriates who reside outside the Republic of Austria.

The interests of these approximately 613,300 Austrians living abroad, mostly in Germany (255,500), Switzerland (67,000), the UK (39,600), USA (39,000) and Australia (22,500), are represented by the World Federation of Austrians Abroad (German: Auslandsösterreicher-Weltbund), an NGO with headquarters in Vienna, Austria. It is also an umbrella organisation for more than 170 Austrian clubs worldwide, publisher of the quarterly magazine ROTWEISSROT (named after the colours of the Austrian flag), and runs the online community austrians.org (founded in 2004 by Gerald Ganglbauer).

== Communities ==
- Austrian Americans
- Austrian Argentines
- Austrian Australians
- Austrian Brazilians
- Austrian Canadians
- Austrian Mexicans
- Austrians of Croatia
- Transylvanian Landlers (i.e. Austrians of Romania)
- Austrian South African
- Austrians in the United Kingdom
- Austrian Uruguayans

== Austrian citizens abroad in July 2023 ==
Only Austrian citizens are taken into account, thus excluding people of Austrian descent, the case of the overwhelming majority of Austrian Canadians, Austrian Americans or Austrian Brazilians.

Rank	Country	Austrian citizens in the country in 2023	Notes
1	Germany	255,500	Bordering Austria
2	Switzerland	67,000	Bordering Austria
3	United Kingdom	39,600	
4	United States of America	39,000	
5	Australia	22,500	
6	Israel	18,200	
7	Spain	13,000	
8	Brazil	12,500	
9	Argentina	10,500	
10	Greece	10,000	
11	Netherlands	9,900	
12	Italy	8,500	Bordering Austria
13	France	7,300	
14	Turkey	5,500	
15	South Africa	5,400	
16	Czech Republic	5,000	Bordering Austria
17	Hungary	5,000	Bordering Austria
18	Sweden	4,700	
19	Canada	4,500	
20	Belgium	4,000	
21	Serbia	3,500	
22	United Arab Emirates	3,500	
23	Egypt	3,300	
24	Mexico	3,300	
25	Romania	3,200	
26	Norway	3,000	
27	Thailand	3,000	
28	Chile	2,500	
29	Liechtenstein	2,500	Bordering Austria
30	Denmark	2,100	
31	Poland	2,000	
32	Colombia	1,700	
33	Croatia	1,700	
34	Portugal	1,700	
35	China	1,600	
36	New Zealand	1,500	
	Rest of the world	25,600	

== See also ==
- German Speaking Evangelical Congregation in Iran
- Ashkenazi Synagogue of Istanbul
- German-Speaking Jewry Heritage Museum Tefen
- Geographical distribution of German speakers
