= Saint Prince Lazar Serbian Orthodox Church (Birmingham) =

Serbian Orthodox church in Birmingham, United Kingdom

Coordinates: 52.4263°N 1.9513°W

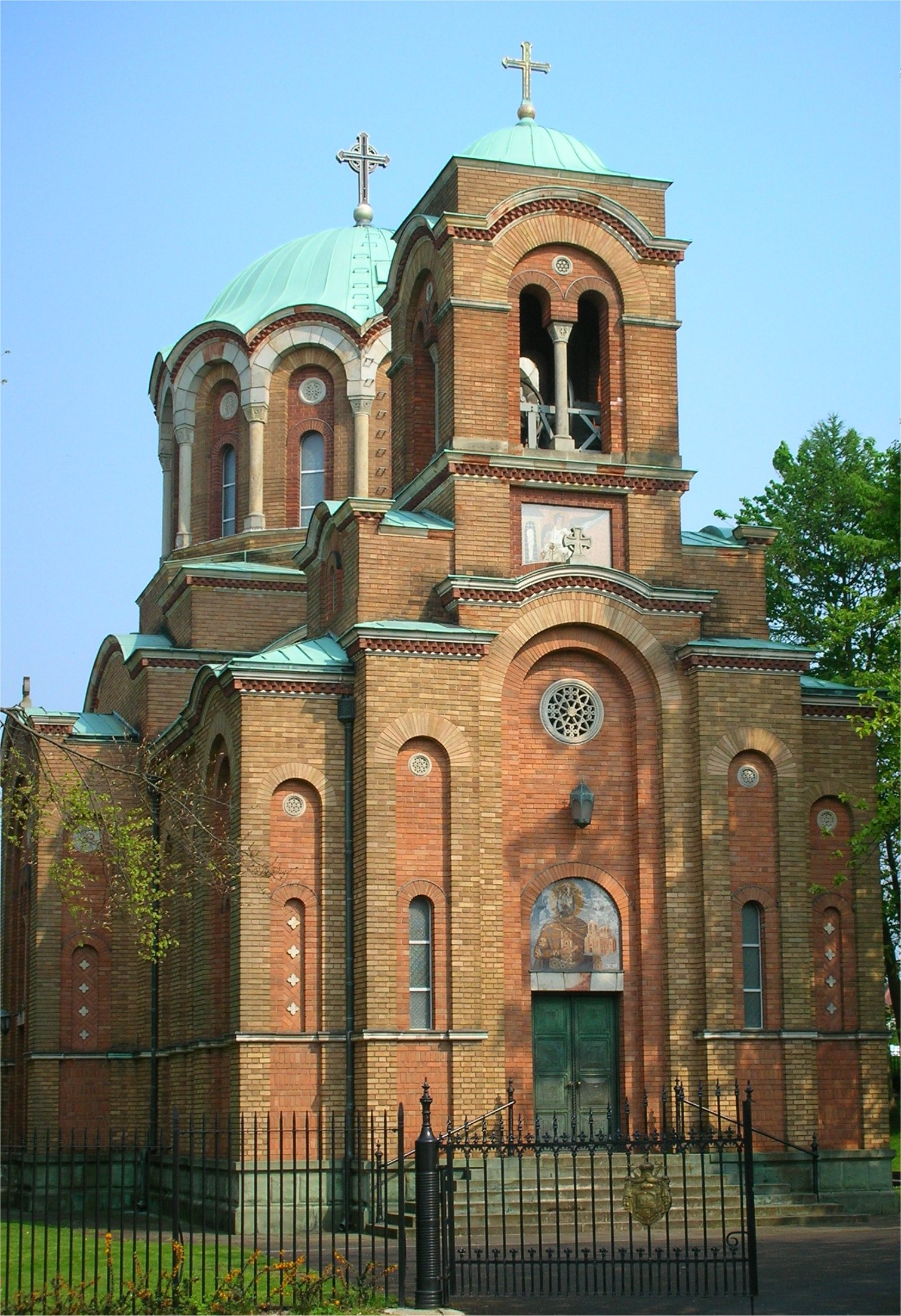
- Saint Prince Lazar Serbian Orthodox Church, pictured in 2007
- Saint Prince Lazar Serbian Orthodox Church
- Location: Bournville, Birmingham, England
- Denomination: Serbian Orthodox Church
- Website: lazarica.co.uk

History
- Consecrated: 1968

Architecture
- Architect: Dragomir Tadić
- Architectural type: Serbo-Byzantine

Administration
- Diocese: Serbian Orthodox Eparchy of Britain and Ireland

Saint Prince Lazar Serbian Orthodox Church (Serbian: Српска православна црква Српска православна црква Светог кнеза Лазара, romanized: Srpska pravoslavna crkva Svetog kneza Lazara), also known as Lazarica (Лазарица) is an Eastern Orthodox church located in Bournville, Birmingham, England. It is under jurisdiction of the Serbian Orthodox Eparchy of Britain and Ireland of the Serbian Orthodox Church and is dedicated to Lazar of Serbia.

== History ==
Serbs have been associated with Bournville since Dame Elizabeth Cadbury sponsored thirteen Serbian refugee children of World War I. Church was built for political refugees from Yugoslavia after World War II, with the support of the exiled Prince Tomislav of Yugoslavia.

== Architecture ==
Built in traditional 14th-century Byzantine form by Serbian architect Dragomir Tadić and Bournville Village Trust, it is a replica of a church in Serbia using the same materials from sacred places of worship. Completed in 1968, it is of brick and stone with three sets of bronze doors and a candelabrum from Serbia. It has no seats, which is usual for Orthodox churches. Moreover, the interior has a full scheme of traditional Byzantine decoration. The dome contains the image of Christ Pantocrator, and the hemi-dome of the apse contains that of the Virgin Mary. At the bottom of the walls are the warrior saints, above these are patriarchs and priestly saints, and at the top are the apostles and scenes from the twelve major Christian feasts. These murals are painted fresco, meaning that the paint was applied meticulously to wet walls.

The cultural centre is a Grade C locally listed building.

== Gallery ==
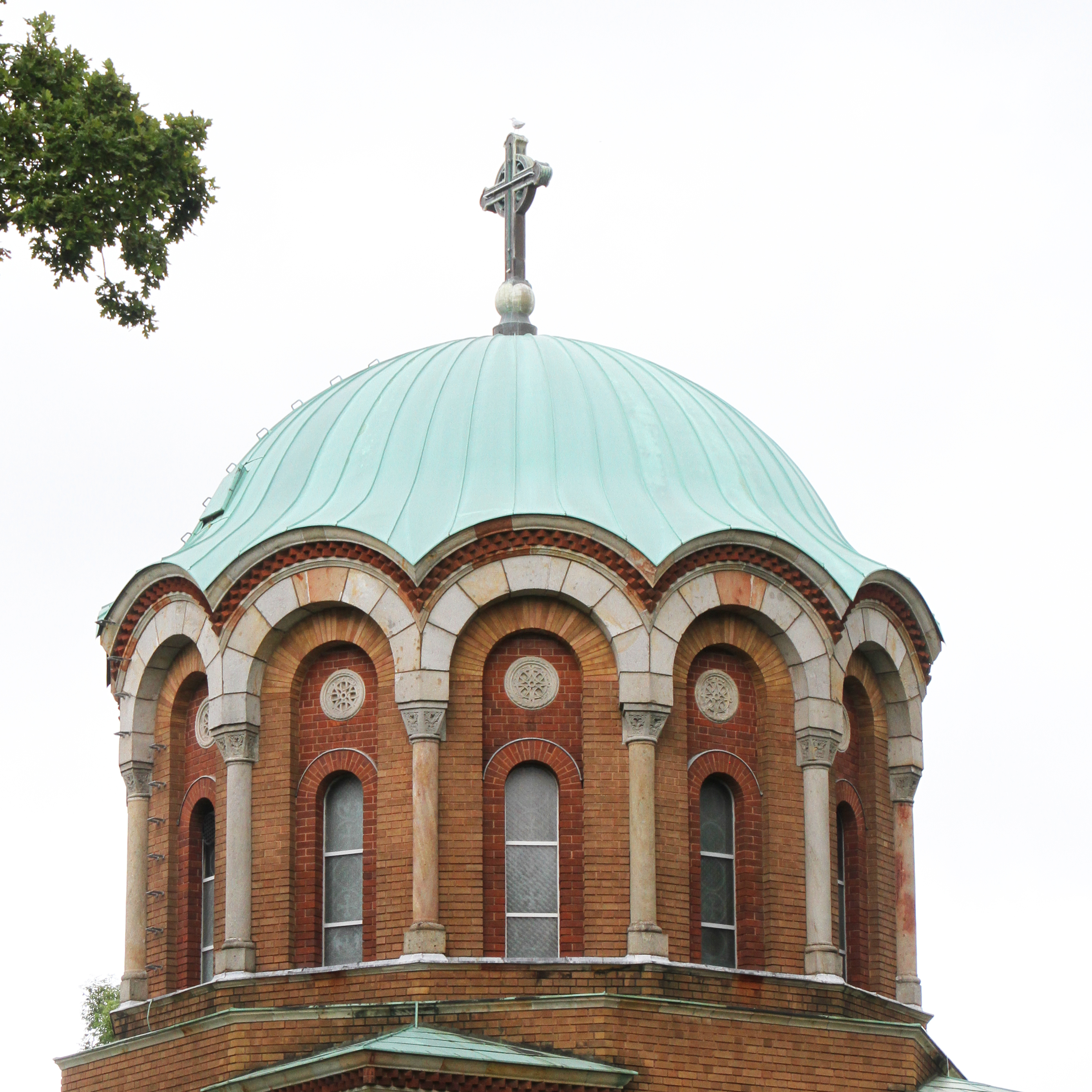
Dome

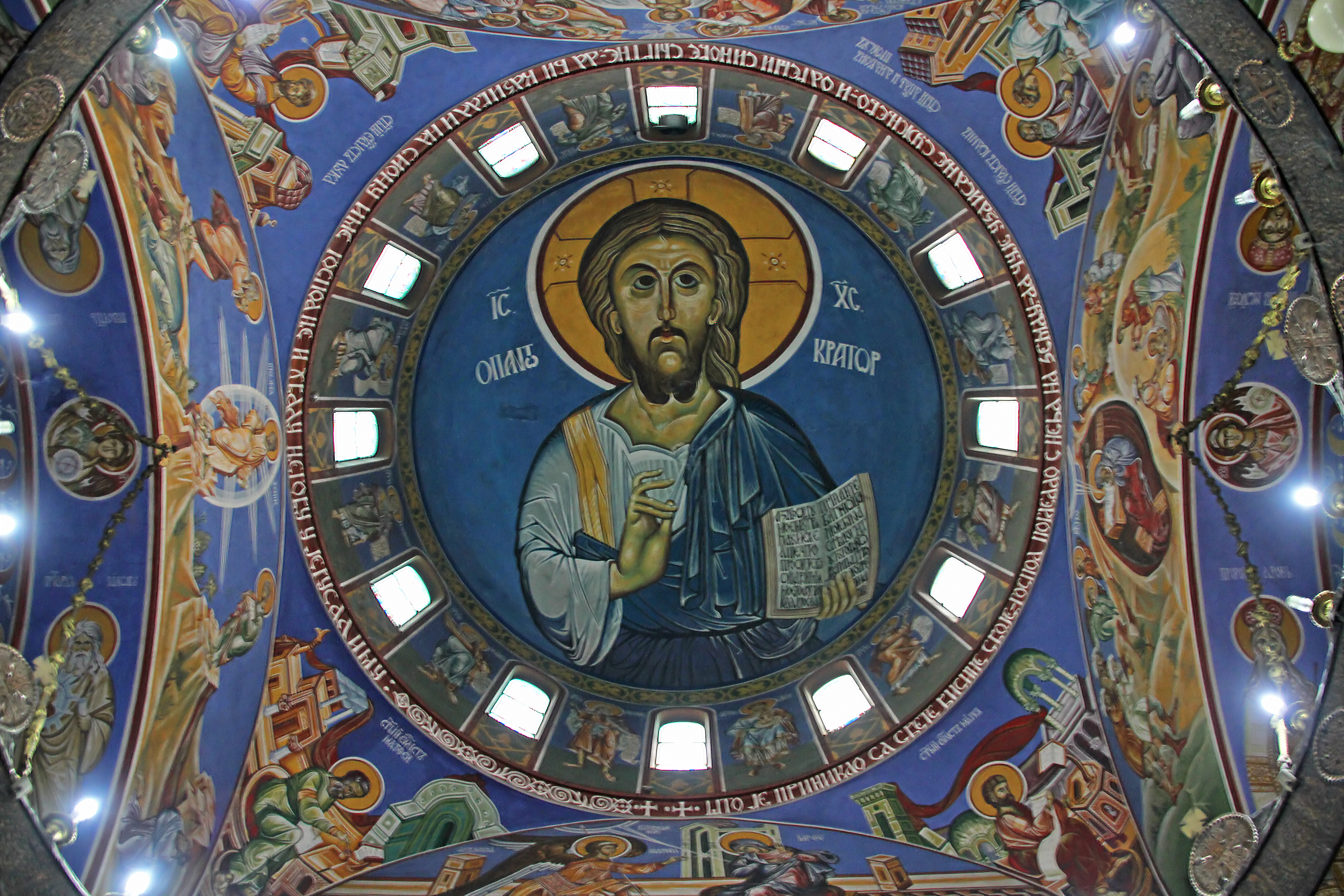
Interior

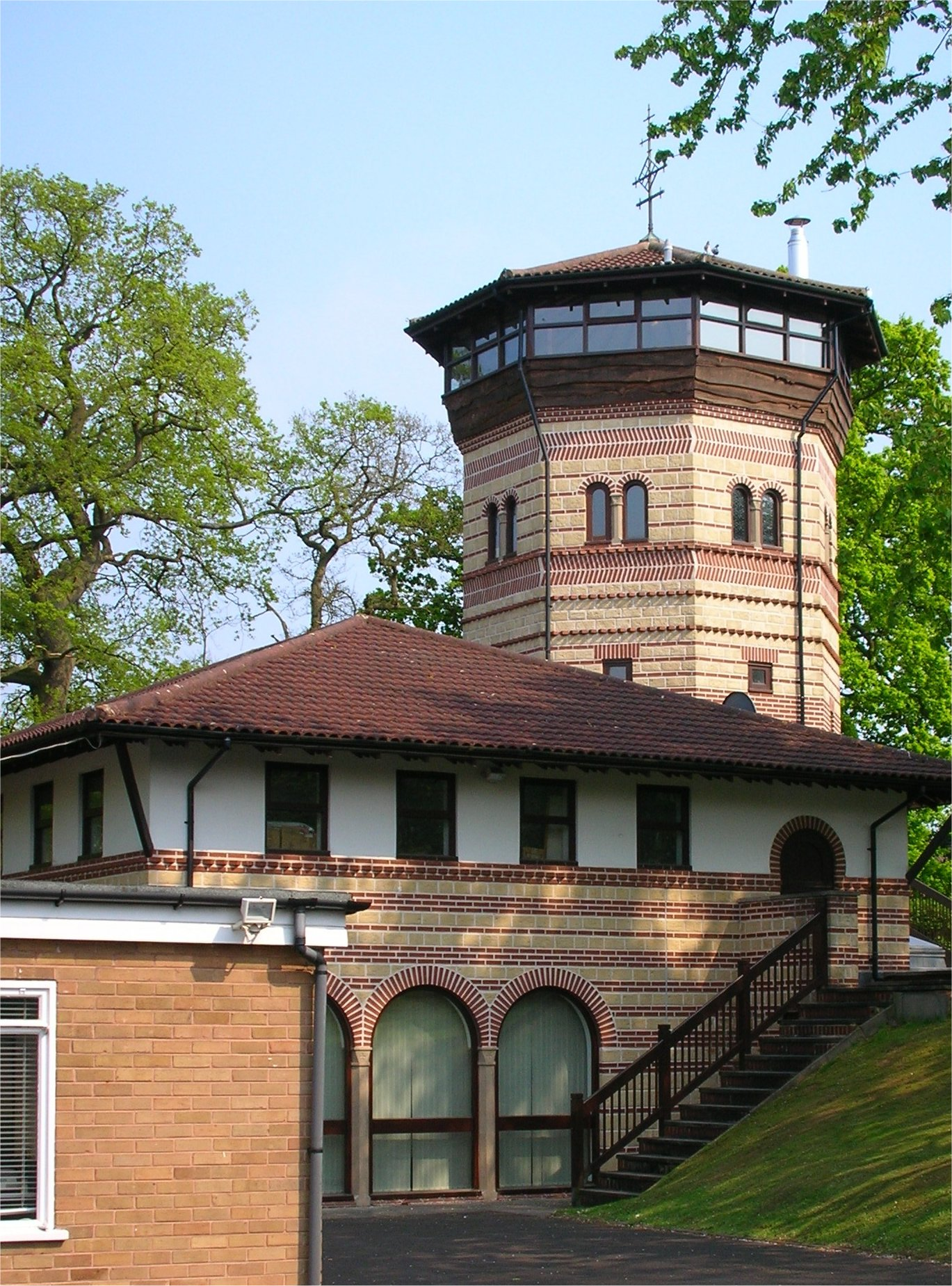
Parish house and cultural center

== See also ==
- Serbian Orthodox Eparchy of Britain and Ireland
- Serbs in the United Kingdom
