= Serbian Orthodox Eparchy of Britain and Ireland =

Diocese of the Serbian Orthodox Church

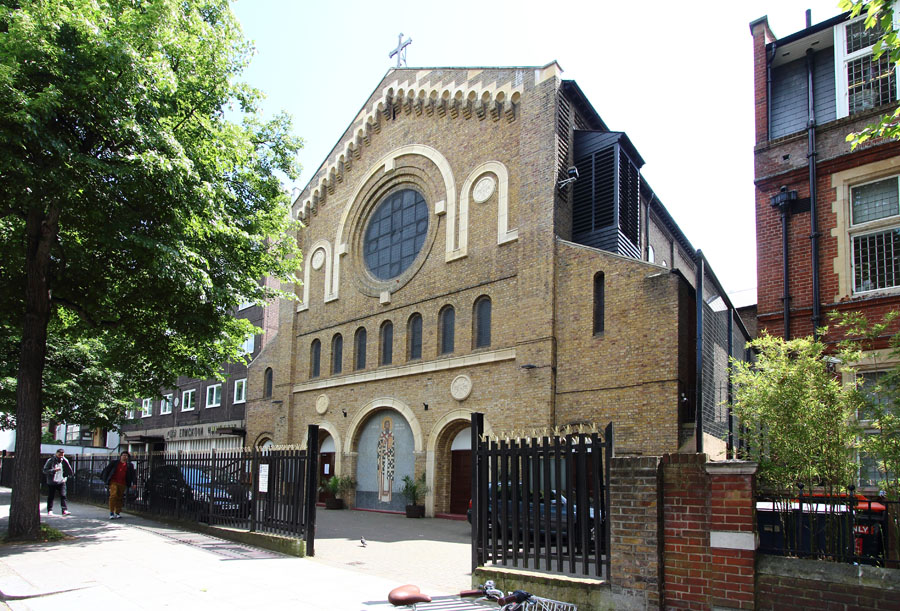
- Saint Sava Cathedral, London

Location
- Territory: United Kingdom, Ireland
- Headquarters: London

Information
- Denomination: Eastern Orthodox
- Sui iuris church: Serbian Orthodox Church
- Established: 1990 (as Britain and Scandinavia); 2024 (as Britain and Ireland)
- Cathedral: Saint Sava Cathedral, London
- Language: Church Slavonic, Serbian, English

Current leadership
- Bishop: Nektarije Samardžić

Map

Website
- Serbian Orthodox Eparchy of Britain and Ireland

The Serbian Orthodox Eparchy of Britain and Ireland (Serbian: Српска православна епархија британско-ирска, romanized: Srpska pravoslavna eparhija britansko-irska) is a diocese (eparchy) of the Serbian Orthodox Church, covering Great Britain and Ireland.

== History ==
The first church congregation was established in 1948 in Birmingham, where Saint Prince Lazar Church was built and consecrated in 1968.

The Eparchy of Britain and Ireland was established in 2024 after splitting the existing Eparchy of Britain and Scandinavia in two - creating separate Eparchy of Britain and Ireland and Eparchy of Scandinavia. Nektarije Samardžić was appointed the first bishop of the diocese, enthroned in 2024.

== Structure ==
The Serbian Orthodox Eparchy of Britain and Ireland comprises 8 parishes, of which one is in Ireland. The episcopal see is located at the Saint Sava Cathedral in London.

The diocese operates the following churches:

- Saint Prince Lazar Serbian Orthodox Church (Birmingham)
- Saint John the Baptist Serbian Orthodox Church (Halifax)
- Saints Peter and Paul Serbian Orthodox Church (Derby)
- Saint George Serbian Orthodox Church (Leicester)
- Holy Trinity Serbian Orthodox Church (Bradford)

== Gallery ==
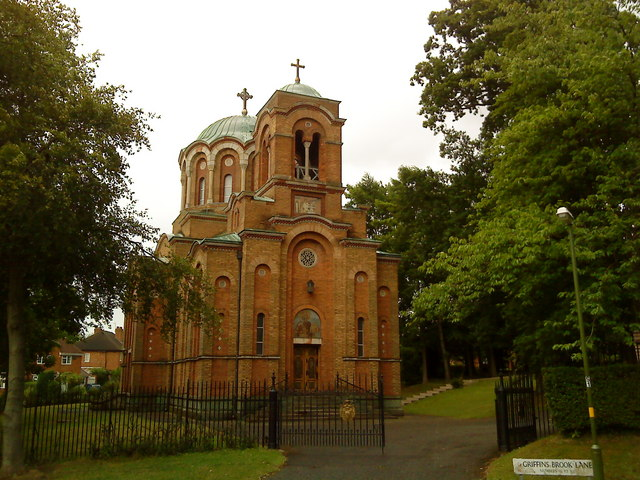
Saint Prince Lazar Church (Birmingham)

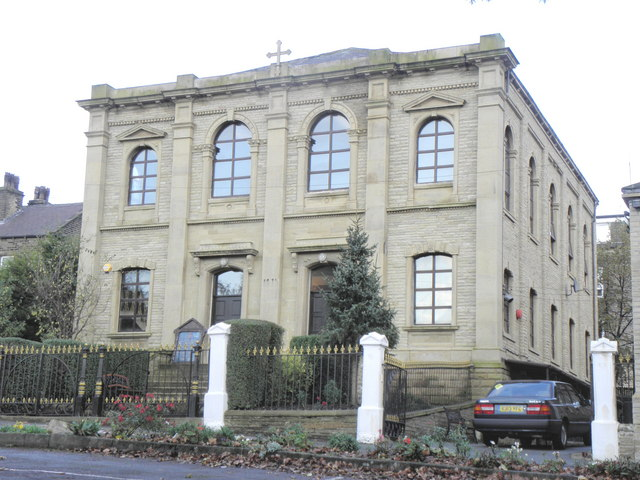
Saint John the Baptist Church (Halifax)

== See also ==
- Assembly of Canonical Orthodox Bishops of Great Britain and Ireland
- Eparchies and metropolitanates of the Serbian Orthodox Church
- Serbs in the United Kingdom
