= Austria–United Kingdom relations =

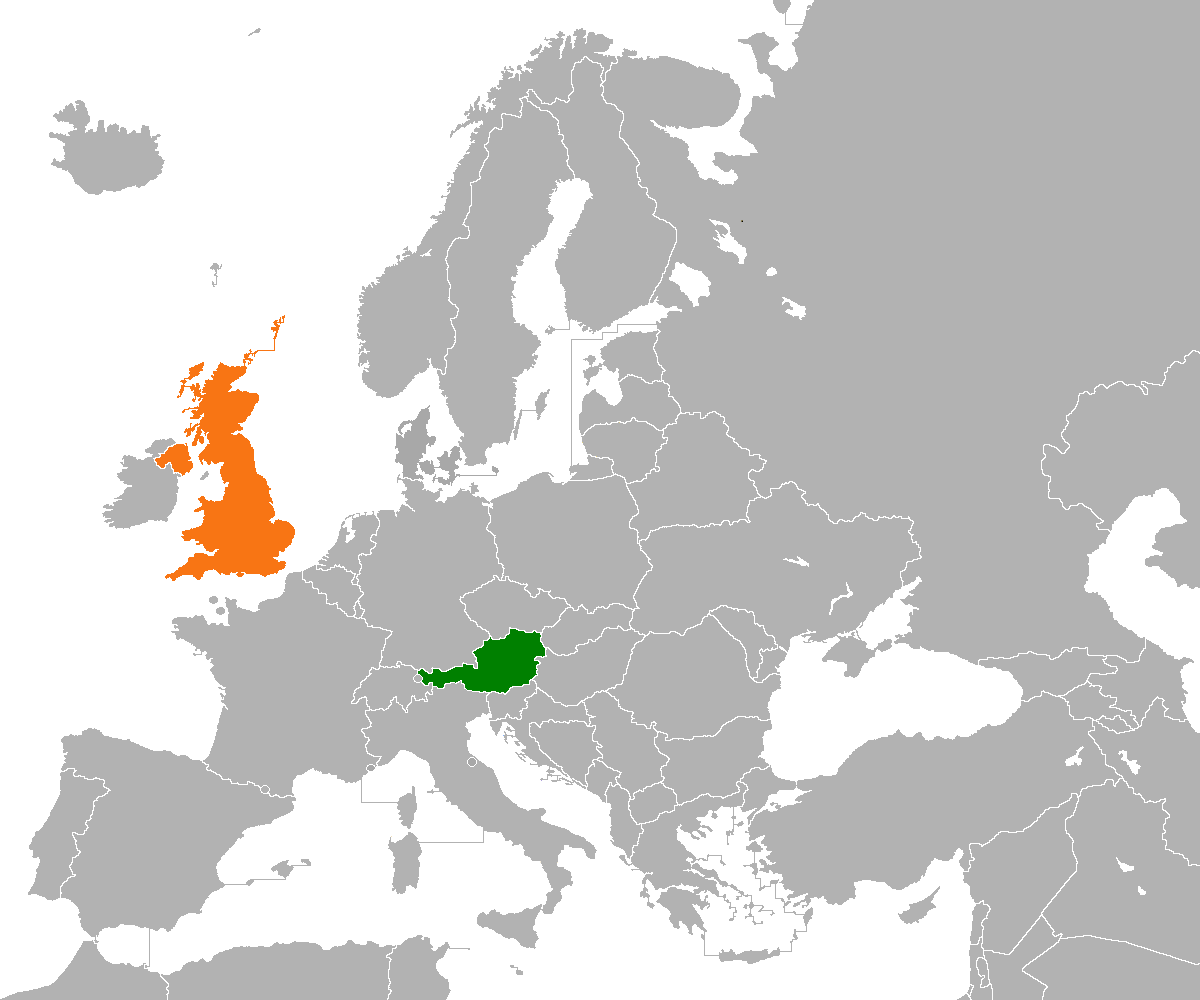

- Austria: United Kingdom

Diplomatic mission
- Embassy of Austria, London: Embassy of the United Kingdom, Vienna

Foreign relations exist between Austria and the United Kingdom, and have been positive and friendly since Austrian independence in 1955. Both nations are members of the Council of Europe. The two nations share close economic and technological ties, and cooperate in a variety of fields, particularly when the UK was a member of the European Union and also more recently in condemning Russia's invasion of Ukraine. They have also agreed to cooperate on mutual interests over matters involving security in the Balkans, including regarding Kosovo, Albania and Serbia and furthermore to work together on countering subversive Russian activity in the region. Austria is a European Union member and the United Kingdom is a former European Union member. the United Kingdom is a member of NATO. Austria instead is not a member of NATO.

== History ==
Relations between the Duchy of Austria and the Kingdom of England were established in the Middle Ages through interactions of their respective rulers. A notable example is Duke Leopold V's imprisonment of King Richard I in 1193. From 1731 to 1756, Great Britain was closely aligned with the Austrian Habsburg monarchy in the Anglo-Austrian Alliance. Both countries were more loosely aligned as part of a broad anti-French coalition during the Napoleonic Wars. Formal relations began only in 1799. The Austrian Empire established a diplomatic mission in London in 1816.

The rapprochement between Great Britain and Austria-Hungary in the 1870s was shaped by the Eastern Crisis and mutual interests in European balance of power. Britain, under Prime Minister Benjamin Disraeli, sought to limit Russian expansion and protect trade routes connected to the Ottoman Empire. Austria-Hungary, led by Emperor Franz Joseph and Foreign Minister Count Julius Andrássy, faced the risk of Slavic nationalist movements near its southern borders and the potential destabilization of its diverse empire. Bureaucratic negotiations, lobby groups, and public opinion shaped British and Austro-Hungarian approaches. Andrássy Note subsequent diplomatic correspondence indicated Austria-Hungary’s willingness to seek British backing for Balkan stability. Britain prioritized preservation of its imperial trade interests and sought stability without deep military commitments in Central Europe. Austria-Hungary aimed for pragmatic cooperation to counterbalance it rivalry with Russian ambitions while maintaining internal stability. While both powers improved diplomatic communications and fostered understanding between the two empires, it remained limited to cordial relations. Deeper alliances were constrained by domestic politics, the existing Habsburg-Hohenzollern Alliance, and the cautious strategy of industrial and colonial prioritization by Britain. This period set a foundation for cooperation in subsequent European diplomatic developments leading up the Great War.

The Austrian-British initially portion part of the Mediterranean Agreements. Effectively, the agreement joined Britain with the powers of the Triple Alliance in European affairs, especially to counter Russian influence in southeastern Europe and the Eastern Mediterranean, Ensuring it from gaining control over the Dardanelles and Bosporus Straits, which were vital for naval and trade routes. Count Gołuchowski aimed to preserve Habsburg interests near the Straits by carefully managing Austro-Hungarian commitments. On 16 January 1896, he instructed Austrian diplomats to initiate negotiations to renew the Second Mediterranean Agreement of December 1887. Lord Salisbury initially sympathetic to Austrian concerns about Russian influence, resisted renewing the Mediterranean Agreements under terms that would overly constrain British Cabinet divisions and a public opinion especially in reaction to Armenian events in the Ottoman Empire. Britain’s strategy prioritized maintaining flexibility, especially regarding potential conflicts with Russia and the defense of the Straits. Communication between Salisbury and Gołuchowski indicates that Salisbury was willing to provide assurances of British interest in the Eastern Mediterranean but refused binding commitments that could obligate future governments.

The two nations were enemies during the First World War and the Second World War. During WWII, British prisoners of war were among Allied POWs held in the Stalag XVII-A, Stalag XVII-B, Stalag XVIII-A, Stalag XVIII-B, Stalag 317/XVIII-C, Stalag 398 and Oflag XVIII-A German POW camps and forced labour subcamps operated in German-annexed Austria.

The President of Austria, Franz Jonas, paid a state visit to the United Kingdom in May 1966. In May 1969, HM Queen Elizabeth II of the United Kingdom paid a state visit to Austria.

According to the 2001 UK Census, some 20,000 Austrian born people were living in the UK, which is actually a drop of around 5% from 1991, despite this there are also large but unknown numbers of British born people of Austrian descent.

== Economic relations ==
Following Brexit, Trade between the United Kingdom and Austria is governed by the EU–UK Trade and Cooperation Agreement since 1 January 2021.

== Diplomacy ==
The Austrian ambassador to the United Kingdom is Bernhard Wrabetz in succession to Michael Zimmermann, he took up his post in August 2018. The British ambassador to Austria is Lindsay Skoll who took up her post in September 2021.

== Resident diplomatic missions ==
- The Austrian embassy in London is at 18, Belgrave Square.
- The United Kingdom has an embassy in Vienna.
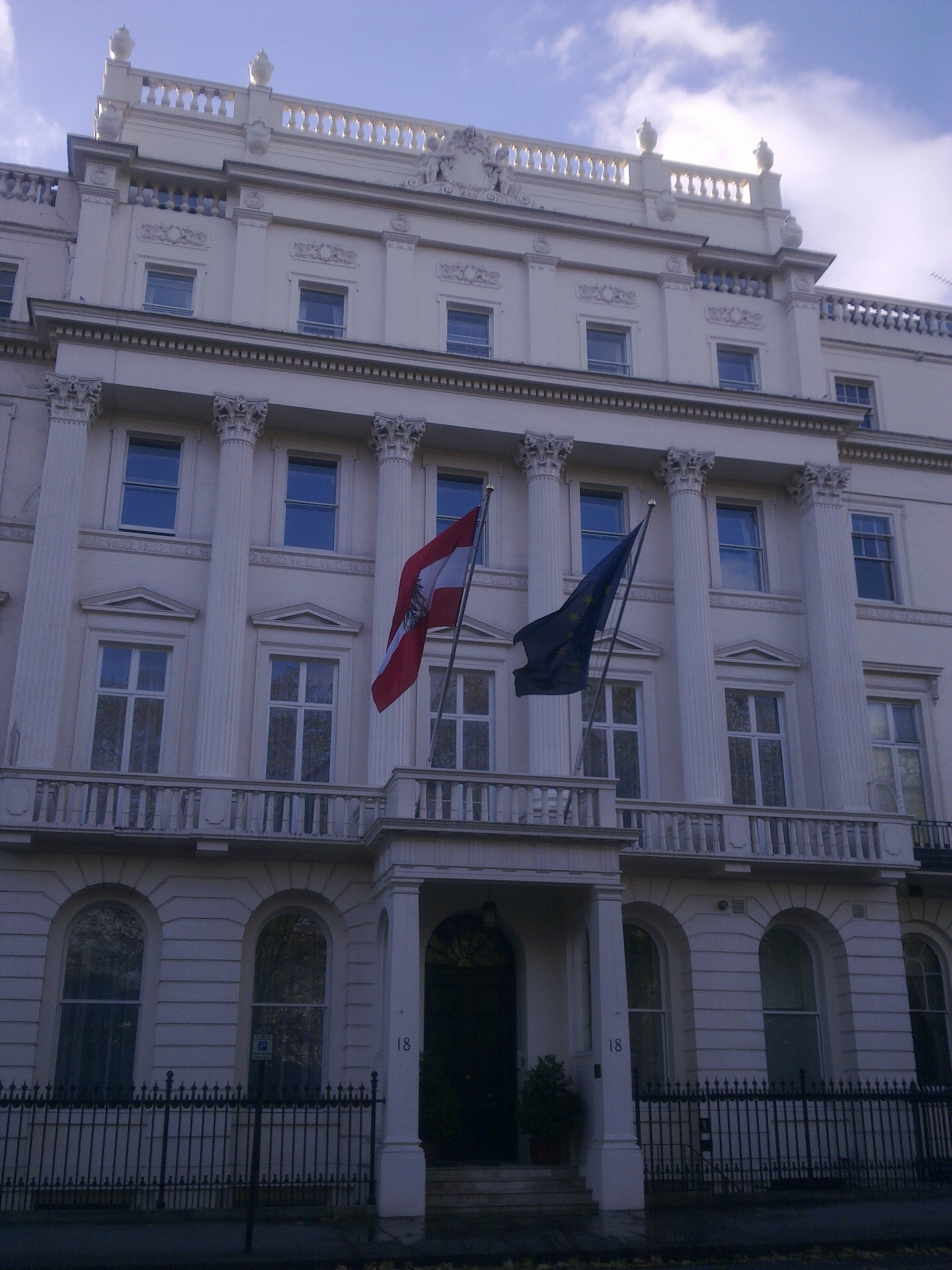
Embassy of Austria in London - The only embassy building of Imperial Austria still used today as an Austrian embassy.

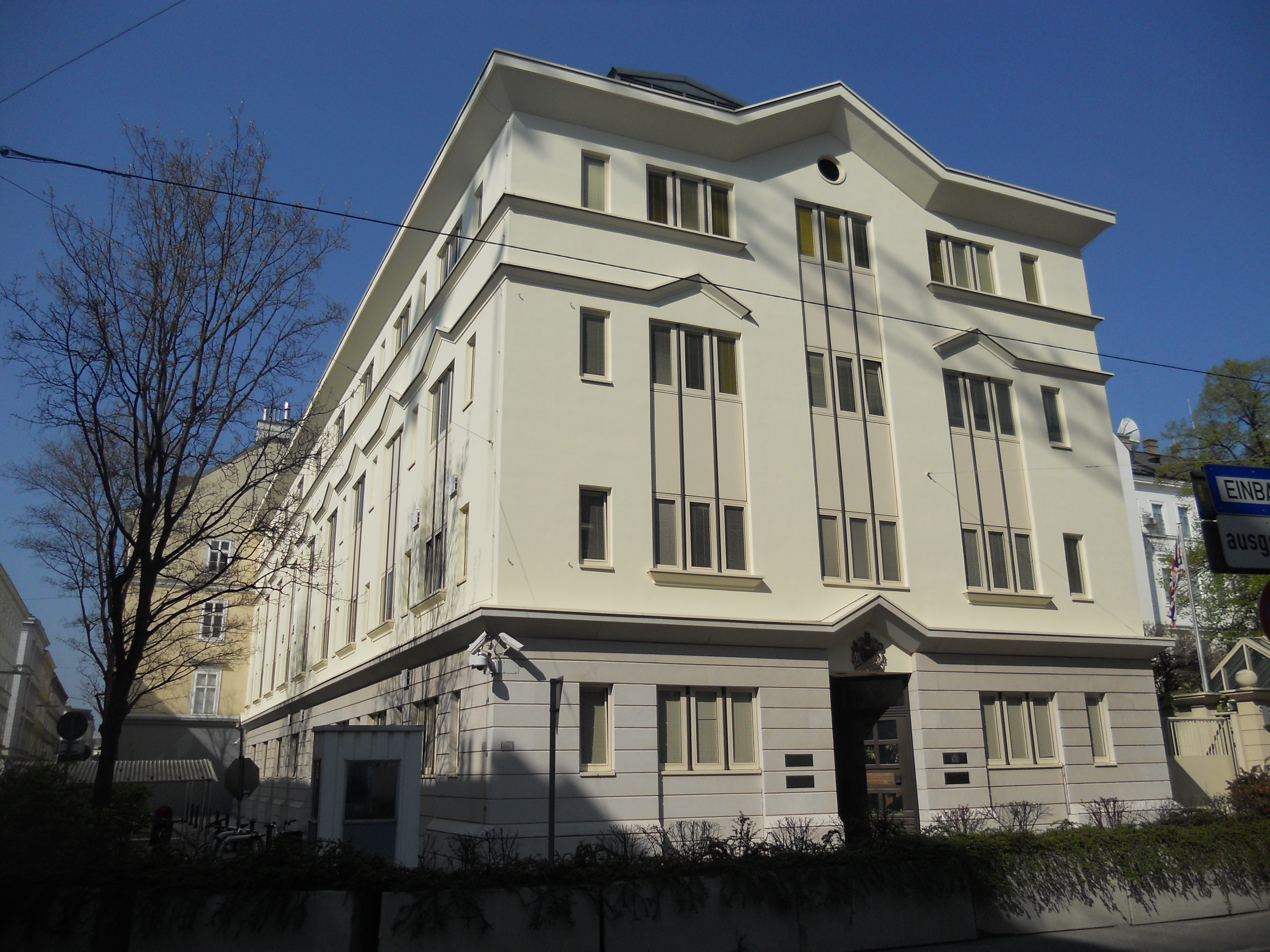
Embassy of the United Kingdom in Vienna

== See also ==
- Foreign relations of Austria
- Foreign relations of the United Kingdom
- Austrians in the United Kingdom
- Brits in Austria
- Anglo-Austrian Alliance, a historic military alliance between the states that existed between 1731 and 1756
- United Kingdom–European Union relations
