= Kosovans in the United Kingdom =

Regions with significant populations
- London

Languages
- Albanian · British English

Religion
- Islam, Christianity, irreligious

Kosovo Albanians have settled or temporarily lived in the United Kingdom since the 1990s. The earliest arrivals from Kosovo settled in London with pockets of arrivals in other cities. The 2011 Census recorded 28,390 Kosovo-born residents (of all ethnicities) in England and 56 in Wales. The censuses of Scotland and Northern Ireland recorded 215 and 44 Kosovo-born residents, respectively.

During the Kosovo War, some Kosovans claimed asylum in the UK. During 1998, there were 7,980 applications from Federal Republic of Yugoslavia citizens, most of whom were Kosovo Albanians. The number of asylum applications received from Kosovo (excluding dependants) was 140 in 1996, 600 in 1997, 4,580 in 1998 and 9,850 in 1999. Between 15 June and 13 September 1999, consideration asylum claims from the FR Yugoslavia was suspended; asylum seekers who had applied prior to 24 March 1999 given one year's exceptional leave to remain. On 13 September 1999, the Home Secretary announced that due to the improved security situation in Kosovo, all asylum claims by Kosovo Albanians would be judged on individual merits again. In the majority of cases, claims would be refused unless exceptional circumstances applied.

In addition to asylum seekers, 4,346 refugees were evacuated to the UK between 25 April and 25 June 1999 as agreed with the United Nations High Commissioner for Refugees (UNHCR) and were either granted family reunification rights, if they had family members who had been through the asylum process, or were given leave to remain in the UK for one year. 68 people arrived through later medical evacuations. The first request from the UNHCR was received by the Home Office on 20 April and was agreed within an hour. The first plane of refugees from Kosovo arrived in the UK at Leeds Bradford Airport on Sunday 25 April carrying 161 refugees, mainly women and children, including three cases in need of medical treatment. The second plane of 169 refugees arrived at East Midlands Airport on 29 April. Return flights enabling refugees to return home commenced on 19 July 1999.

== Notable people ==
- Dua Lipa - singer and songwriter
- Geraldo Bajrami - footballer
- DJ Regard - musician
- Rita Ora - singer, songwriter and actress
- Qendresa - singer, songwriter and producer

== See also ==
- Albanians in the United Kingdom
- Serbs in the United Kingdom
- Kosovo–United Kingdom relations
