= Albanians in the United Kingdom =

Shqiptarët në Mbretërinë e Bashkuar

Total population
- 13,666 (born in Albania, 2011 census); 47,000 (born in Albania, 2019 ONS estimate); 21,000 (Albanian nationals, 2021 ONS estimate); Other estimates 70,000–100,000 ethnic Albanians (2008 community estimates)

Regions with significant populations
- London (Barking, Golders Green, Hendon, Palmers Green, Swiss Cottage, Walthamstow, Wood Green), Birmingham

Languages
- British English, Albanian

Religion
- Christianity, Islam, Irreligious

Related ethnic groups
- Albanian diaspora

Albanians in the United Kingdom (Albanian: Shqiptarët në Mbretërinë e Bashkuar) include immigrants from Albania and ethnic Albanians from Kosovo. According to estimates from the Office for National Statistics, there were 47,000 Albanian-born residents of the United Kingdom in 2019.

== History ==
Albanians in the United Kingdom were first mentioned as merchants and seamen on the coasts of England during the 14th and 15th centuries.

Albanian stradioti mercenaries during the 16th century served the English king in his wars against the Kingdom of Scotland.

The history of modern-day Albanians in the UK began in the early 20th century, when a small group of Albanians arrived in this country. Among them was one of the greatest Albanian intellectuals, Faik Konica, who moved to London and continued to publish the magazine Albania, which he had founded in Brussels. Shortly after World War II, there were about 100 Albanians in Britain.

The 1991 census recorded only 338 Albanians in England. In 1993, the figure had risen to 2,500. Many were young Kosovars who avoided recruiting into the Yugoslav Army, who had sought political asylum. In June 1996, a Supreme Court decision accepted that Kosovo Albanians were persecuted in the former Yugoslavia. This meant that all Kosovo Albanians should be granted residence permits in Britain. After this decision, Britain faced a huge and unexpected influx of Albanians from Kosovo, Albania, the Republic of Macedonia, Montenegro and Serbia. By the end of 1997, around 30,000 Albanians lived in Britain.

Many Albanians are reported to have moved to the UK by pretending to be Kosovans fleeing the Kosovo War.

== Demography ==
| Religion | England and Wales | | | | |
| Religion | 2011 | | 2021 | | |
|---|---|---|---|---|---|
| Religion | Christianity | 6,082 | 45.34 | 23,504 | 34.23 |
| Islam | 3,633 | 27.09 | 20,479 | 29.82 | |
| No religion | 4,406 | 32.84 | 17,932 | 26.11 | |
| Buddhism | 15 | 0.10 | 28 | 0.04 | |
| Judaism | 17 | 0.11 | 27 | 0.04 | |
| Hinduism | 8 | 0.06 | 7 | 0.01 | |
| Sikhism | 4 | 0.03 | 4 | 0.01 | |
| Other religions | 43 | 0.30 | 314 | 0.46 | |
| Not Stated | 1,299 | 9.68 | 6,377 | 9.29 | |
| Total | 13,415 | 100.00 | 68,672 | 100.00 | |

A mapping exercise published by the International Organization for Migration in September 2008 states that there were no official estimates of the total number of ethnic Albanians in the UK at the time. The majority of respondents interviewed for the exercise estimated the population to lie between 70,000 and 100,000.

The 2011 Census recorded 13,295 Albanian-born residents in England and 120 in Wales, The censuses of Scotland and Northern Ireland recorded 196 and 55 Albanian-born residents respectively. The census recorded 28,390 Kosovo-born residents (including people all ethnicities) in England and 56 in Wales. The censuses of Scotland and Northern Ireland recorded 215 and 44 Kosovo-born residents respectively. In 2019, the Office for National Statistics estimated that 47,000 people born in Albania and 29,000 people born in Kosovo were resident in the UK.

The 2021 Census recorded 67,957 usual residents of England and 715 of Wales who were born in Albania. In Northern Ireland, the figure was 142. The 2022 census in Scotland recorded 1,046 residents born in Albania, for a total of 69,860 Albanian-born residents across the UK. The number of residents of England born in Kosovo was 30,427, with 90 recorded in Wales and 60 in Northern Ireland.

=== Religious demography ===
Of the Albanian-born community residing in England and Wales, approximately 34.2% identified as Christian in the 2021 census and around 29.8% as Muslim, with 26.1% specifying "no religion". 9.3% did not provide a response regarding their religious beliefs.

== Social issues ==
Albanians are amongst the largest groups of undocumented immigrants in the UK, and Albanian children are the second largest group receiving help from Barnardo's child trafficking support teams. In 2010, Albanians were not seen as a significantly at-risk group, but in 2015 Barnardo's estimated that Albanians accounted for a quarter of children allocated an advocate under its child trafficking support scheme. Some are forced to work, particularly on building sites, but the majority are exploited for criminal activities.

Albanians seeking asylum in the UK regularly cite blood feuds as the reason that it is unsafe for them to return to Albania. The number of Albanian asylum applicants rose from 173 in 2008 to 1,809 in 2015. The vast majority of applications citing blood feuds were rejected.

Between April 2015 and April 2019, 6,200 Albanian nationals were deported from the UK to Albania. This was the highest number of any nationality over this period. Many of these deportees are reported to be from the counties of Shkodër, Kukës and Dibër, from where British-based drugs gangs recruit.

=== Organised criminal groups ===
In June 2017, the National Crime Agency (NCA)'s annual report on organised crime warned that Albanian criminal groups had "established a high-profile influence within UK organised crime", focusing mainly on the trafficking of cocaine to London. The report noted that "The threat faced from Albanian crime groups is significant. London is their primary hub, but they are established across the UK". It also noted that only 0.8% of organized criminals in the UK are Albanians, with British nationals accounting for 61.6% (23.5% are of unknown nationality). Albanian organised criminals display a readiness to use serious violence, which according to the National Crime Agency makes their impact more troubling, however.

Albanian organised criminal groups have utilised their global networks to become the largest controller of the UK's cocaine market. Local networks have been established in corner shops and barbers in towns across the UK, with teenagers targeted for recruitment in distributing drugs. Intelligence from the NCA found that Albanian organised criminal groups have smuggled hundreds of millions of pounds from the UK to Albania every year and may also be responsible for the increase in Albanians smuggled into the UK. The NCA has revealed that a significant proportion of its 70 live immigration investigations have been linked to Albanian organised criminal groups. Albanians working in UK-based cannabis sites can reportedly be paid £10,000 over 10 weeks. Smugglers are paid between €3,000 and €15,000 for entry into the UK via ferries and freight shipping routes. The cost ranges from €5,000 to €20,000 to be smuggled through other means, including by small boats. Those who are unable to pay the fee upfront, sign debt bondage agreements and work illegally once they arrive in the UK leading them to become vulnerable to exploitation. The NCA reports that many Albanian asylum seekers disappear from Home Office provided hotels and accommodations once their arrivals are processed.

=== Small boat crossings ===
Albanians arriving by small boats
| Year | Number |
|---|---|
| 2018 | 16 |
| 2019 | 13 |
| 2020 | 54 |
| 2021 | 815 |
| 2022 | 12,301 |
| 2023 | 927 |
| Total | 14,483 |

In August 2022, it was reported that British government officials believed that Albanians made up 50 to 60% of irregular small boat migrant arrivals, with 1,727 Albanian arrivals recorded in May and June 2022 compared to only 898 between 2018 and 2021. In the first half of 2022, Albanians made up 18% of the recorded arrivals. For 2022, 14,223 Albanians claimed asylum in the UK of which 9,573 came to the UK from small boats, 83% of claimants were adult males. Albanians represented the most common nationality for asylum seeking applicants to the UK. 53% of Albanian asylum seekers' claims were granted in an initial decision in the year to June 2022. In October 2022, a committee of British Members of Parliament heard that so far that year over 12,000 people from Albania had entered the UK via small boat during the English Channel migrant crossings. An estimated 10,000 of which were adult men which represented around 'one to two percent' of the entire male population of Albania.

The rise in numbers was blamed on Albanian criminal groups gaining a foothold in northern France. A report from the National Crime Agency (NCA) stated that Albanian criminal groups now control large parts of the cannabis and cocaine markets, with Albanians now responsible for producing the most cannabis in the UK, which has led to the increase in small boat arrivals due to the need for labour in organised crime. Crime figures have found that 75% of Albanian nationals who have arrived using small boats have committed at least one criminal offence in the UK. When Albanians are caught working at cannabis sites or other criminal enterprises, the NCA claims that they are coached before they arrive in the UK to say they are trafficking victims and are "manipulating" the UK's modern slavery laws. In 2022, 4,613 Albanians were referred into the National Referral Mechanism (NRM), the UK's system for identifying victims of modern slavery, representing 27% of all those who were referred and the most common nationality overall. 1,467 Albanians from small boat arrivals were referred to the NRM in 2022 - 12% of all Albanian small boat arrivals. In the 15 months to March 2023, freedom of information figures have revealed that 12,842 Albanians have breached their immigration bail conditions – more than the total number of Albanians who arrived using small boats in the same period. Other reasons cited for Albanians arriving by small boats include high levels of social media promotion, particularly on TikTok, and the UK's higher likelihood of granting asylum compared to other European countries. In 2022, 28 of the 31 EU+ countries (the EU-27, Switzerland, and the three European Economic Area Countries: Iceland, Liechtenstein, and Norway) did not grant asylum protection to a single Albanian adult, compared to the United Kingdom's grant rate of 48%.

In March 2023, Albanian Prime Minister Edi Rama, who has been frequently linked to organised criminal groups in Albania, met British Prime Minister Rishi Sunak at Downing Street to discuss the issue. Rama criticised members of the UK government's language used about Albanians arriving via small boats, however acknowledged that Albanians were claiming asylum because they were not part of the free labour market and for general "economic reasons". In April 2023, the UK government announced that over 1,000 Albanian nationals have been deported since the signing of the UK-Albania joint communiqué in December 2022. In June 2023, the Home Affairs Select Committee published a report stating that there is "little evidence" Albanians were at risk in their own country and concluded that the UK should not routinely grant asylum to Albanian nationals.

Following a 90% reduction in the number of Albanians using small boats to cross the English Channel in 2023 due to a returns deals with Albania, Albanians have reportedly found new passageways to enter the UK. A new route taking Albanians from Santander in Spain to Portsmouth via lorry, at a cost of £14,000 per passenger, has been promoted as a safer alternative to small boats where they are less likely to be detected by border controls.

=== Prison population ===
In 2020, Albanians were reportedly the largest foreign national group in UK prisons with over 1,500 inmates, representing roughly 10% of the foreign prison population in the UK, rising from 2% in 2013. By June 2022, the number of inmates fell to 1,336 (down from a peak of 1,779 in 2021) but the proportion rose to 14%, again maintaining the highest percentage of the foreign prison population in the UK. On a proportion basis, Albanians are 10 times more likely than the general public as a whole to be in prison. Albanians make up 1.6% of all prisoners despite representing fewer than 0.05% of the UK population with convictions ranging from murder, manslaughter, rape, violent disorder, firearms offences, kidnap, causing death by dangerous driving, burglary and producing cannabis in gang-run farms in houses and disused industrial sites. Between 2021 and 2023, Albanians had the highest conviction rate of all nationalities in England and Wales at 4,028 per 10,000 of the population. This rate was 30 times the rate of British nationals whom had a conviction rate of 136 per 10,000 of the population. About 60 per cent of convictions for Albanian nationals were related to drug offences. For the first ten months of 2024, Home Office figures revealed that Albanians were the most likely nationality to be arrested at a rate of 201 arrested per 1,000 Albanians. This was over 17 times more than the rate for British citizens which stood at 12 arrested per 1,000 Britons. Overall, 5,665 Albanians were arrested in the ten-month period.

In July 2021, British Home Secretary Priti Patel signed an agreement with the Albanian Government which would make it easier for the UK to return criminals and unsuccessful asylum seekers back to Albania. It was also reported that the UK could help fund the construction of a new prison in Albania to house offenders sent back from the UK. In March 2023, Albania and the United Kingdom reached an agreement for eligible Albanian prisoners to be deported to Albania once capacity and conditions of prisons in Albania have been assessed. Prisoners who agree to be deported have reportedly had their jail terms reduced and receive a payment of £1,500 under the Facilitated Return Scheme which is available to all foreign nationals.

== See also ==
- Albania–United Kingdom relations
- Kosovans in the United Kingdom
- Serbs in the United Kingdom
