= Vesna Goldsworthy =

Serbian writer and poet

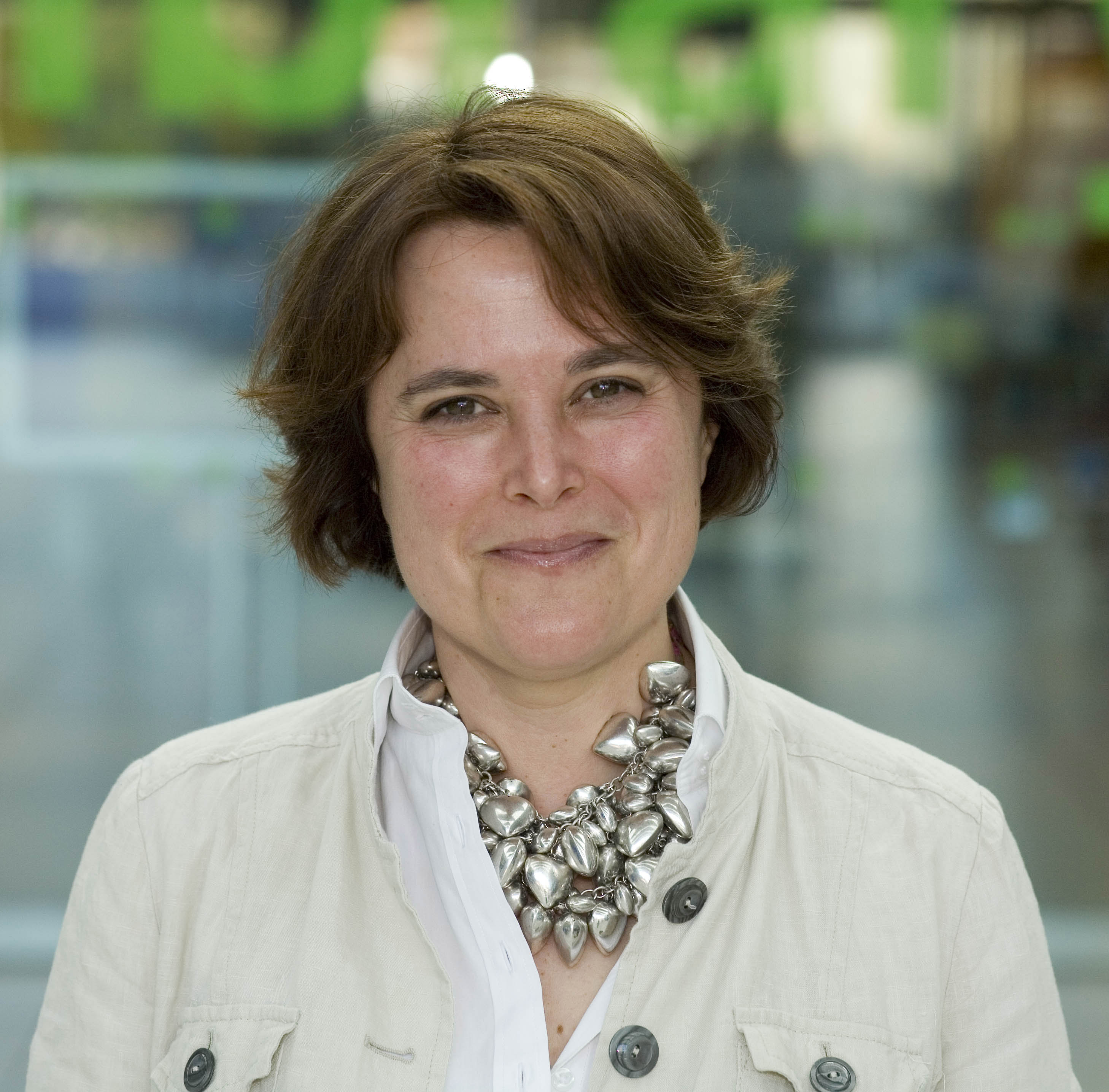
Goldsworthy in 2012

Vesna Goldsworthy FRSL (née Bjelogrlic, Serbian: Bjelogrlić, pronounced: Byelogerlitch) is a Serbian writer and poet. She is from Belgrade and obtained her BA in Comparative Literature and Literary Theory from the University of Belgrade in 1985. She has lived in England since 1986. Goldsworthy became a Professor of Creative Writing at the University of Exeter in 2017. She previously worked at Kingston University where she was Director of the Centre for Suburban Studies. Goldsworthy is a Professor Emeritus of the School of Literature, Drama, and Creative Writing at the University of East Anglia.

Her books include Inventing Ruritania (1998), the memoir Chernobyl Strawberries (2005), and a collection of poems The Angel of Salonika (2011). Her first novel, Gorsky, which updated the story of The Great Gatsby, was published in 2015. Her second novel, Monsieur Ka, which is a development of the story of Anna Karenina, was published in 2018. Goldsworthy published her third novel Iron Curtain: a love story in 2022.

== Biography ==
=== Serbia ===
Goldsworthy wrote poetry since her youth. The poems were published in literary magazines and anthologies throughout the nineteen seventies and nineteen eighties winning a number of prizes in the former Yugoslavia. In 1984 she read a sonnet at a soccer stadium in front of 30,000 people. During the summer of 1984 she attended the Karl Marx Institute of the University of Sofia in order to research Byzantine prayers for her college dissertation and to study Bulgarian.

=== England ===
In 1986 Goldsworthy moved to England. After working for two publishing houses, she spent ten years broadcasting and producing for the BBC World Service in her native Serbian, and in English on BBC Radio 3 and BBC Radio 4. She received an M.A. in Modern English Literature in 1992 and a Ph.D. in 1996, both from the University of London. Goldsworthy then became a faculty member at the University of East Anglia where she continues as Professor Emeritus in the School of Literature, Drama, and Creative Writing. In 2009 Goldsworthy joined the International Dublin Literary Award panel of judges. In 2017 she joined the faculty of the University of Exeter as a Professor of Creative Writing. Goldsworthy is a member of the Folio-Academy.

Her books have been translated into over twenty languages. Goldsworthy read her memoir Chernobyl Strawberries on the BBC. It was listed in the Radio Choice list of The Guardian. J. M. Coetzee commenting on the Angel of Salonika, wrote that her writing was "European in sensibility, elegiac in tone, these poems mark the arrival of a welcome new voice in English poetry."Gorsky, her first novel, remained on the London Times Best Seller list for five months.Gorsky was also listed as a NY Times Editors Choice. The novel Iron Curtain was listed among the Financial Times best summer books of 2022, the New Yorker: Best books We've Read This Year (2023), and The Christian Science Monitor Ten Best Books of February 2023.

== Awards and honors ==
- 2026 Vesna Goldsworthy was nominated for the Nobel Prize for literature by the Association of Writers of Serbia.
- 2024 The Milovan Vidakovic Prize
- 2024 The Luna Virino Prize
- 2022 Momo Kapor Prize
- 2021 Fellow Royal Society of Literature Elected.
- 2011 Crashaw Prize

== Bibliography ==
- Inventing Ruritania: The Imperialism of the Imagination, Yale University Press, 1998, ISBN 978-0300073126
- Chernobyl Strawberries, Atlantic Books, 2005, ISBN 978-1843544142
- Hussein, Aamer (2006). Goldsworthy, Vesna (ed.). Writing Worlds 1, The Norwich Exchanges. Norwich Norfolk[England]: Pen & Ink Press. ISBN 978-1902913261.
- The Angel of Salonika, Salt Publishing, 2011, ISBN 978-1844718788
- Gorsky, The Overlook Press, 2015, ISBN 978-1468312232
- Monsieur Ka, Chatto and Windus, 2018, ISBN 978-1784741181
- Iron curtain: a love story, Chatto and Windus, 2022, ISBN 978-1473596139

== BBC appearances ==
Goldsworthy formerly worked for the BBC Serbian Service as a journalist. In 2010, she presented a BBC Radio 4 programme on finding one's voice in a foreign land. In 2017 she was a guest on BBC Radio 3's Private Passions.

== Other audio selections ==
- Goldsworthy, Vesna (8 February 2019). "Vesna Goldsworthy on re-imagining The Great Gatsby and Anna". CBC Books.
- Goldsworthy, Vesna (4 May 2022). "My Mission Is To Dismantle Prejudices". Cord Magazine.
- Goldsworthy, Vesna (14 May 2023). "Serbian British writer Vesna Goldsworthy on reimagining Anna Karenina". Owltail.
- Goldsworthy, Vesna (Winter 2023). "AN INTERVIEW WITH VESNA GOLDSWORTHY - IRON CURTAIN OF DESTINY OR THE DREAM OF FREEDOM". SAN Serbian American Magazine.
