= Mary J. Hickman =

Mary J. Hickman is Professorial Research Fellow at St Mary's University, Twickenham. She was formerly a Professor of Irish Studies and Sociology at London Metropolitan University and director of its Institute for the Study of European Transformations. She was a member of the Irish Governments Task Force on Policy Regarding Emigrants (2001-2002). She has been Visiting Professor at: New York University, Columbia University and Victoria University, Melbourne. Her current research interests centre on migrations and diasporas. She has been a key figure in the documentation of The Irish Diaspora.

An important analysis of nineteenth-century attitudes by Mary J. Hickman and Bronwen Walter showed that the 'Irish Catholic' was once viewed as an "other" or a different race in the construction of the British nationalist myth.

== Books ==
- Thinking Identities: Ethnicity, Racism and Culture - This book brings together research about a diverse range of groups who are rarely analyzed together: Welsh, Irish, Jewish, Arab, White, African and Indian.
- Feminist Review; Issue 50 the Irish Issue By Mary J. Hickman, Ailbhe Smyth
