= Austrians in the United Kingdom =

Total population
- 41,700 (2024 estimate)

Regions with significant populations
- London · South East England

Languages
- British English · Austrian German

Religion
- Roman Catholicism · Protestantism · Judaism

Related ethnic groups
- Austrian diaspora, Austrians

Austrians in the United Kingdom include citizens or non-citizen immigrants of the United Kingdom who originate from Austria.

== History ==
Austrians have been present in what is now the UK for centuries as merchants, traders and diplomats, but it was only during the 1930s when Austrians came to the UK in significant numbers. The vast majority of these were Austrian Jews who fled to the UK to escape Nazi persecution during the Third Reich or National Socialist Period (1933–1945).

== Population ==
According to 2024 estimates from Statistics Austria, approximately 41,700 Austrian citizens reside in the United Kingdom, making it home to the third-largest Austrian diaspora community globally after Germany and Switzerland.

== Community and organizations ==
The London-based Austrian Club (Österreichischer Klub) has served as a cultural hub since its establishment in 1984 under embassy patronage.

== Notable Austrians in the United Kingdom ==
- Gabrielle Anwar, British-born actress of Austrian and Indian descent
- George Dornbusch, Austrian-born merchant, publisher and activist
- Anna Freud, Austrian-born psychologist
- Sigmund Freud, Austrian-born psychologist
- Sir Ernst Gombrich, Austrian-born art historian
- Friedrich Hayek, Austrian-born economist
- William Patrick Hitler, British-born nephew of Adolf Hitler of Austrian and Irish descent
- Andy Hunt, British-born footballer of Austrian and English descent
- Myleene Klass, British-born singer, actress, TV presenter and model of Austrian and Filipino descent
- Siegfried Frederick Nadel, anthropologist, specialising in African ethnology
- Sir Karl Popper, Austrian-born philosopher of science
- Joe Skarz, British-born footballer of Austrian and English descent
- Friedrich von Hügel, Roman Catholic layman, religious writer, Modernist theologian and Christian apologist
- Peter Vaughn, British actor of Austrian descent on his father's side
- Ruby Wax, American-born comedian of Austrian descent
- Ludwig Wittgenstein, Austrian-born philosopher and engineer who also obtained British citizenship
- Rachel Weisz, British-born actress of Austrian and Hungarian descent.
- Rachel Khoo, British-born cook and author of Austrian and Malaysian descent.

== See also ==
- Austria–United Kingdom relations
- Austrian diaspora
- Immigration to the United Kingdom
- Germans in the United Kingdom
