= Serbs in the United Kingdom =

Срби у Уједињеном Краљевству Srbi u Ujedinjenom Kraljevstvu
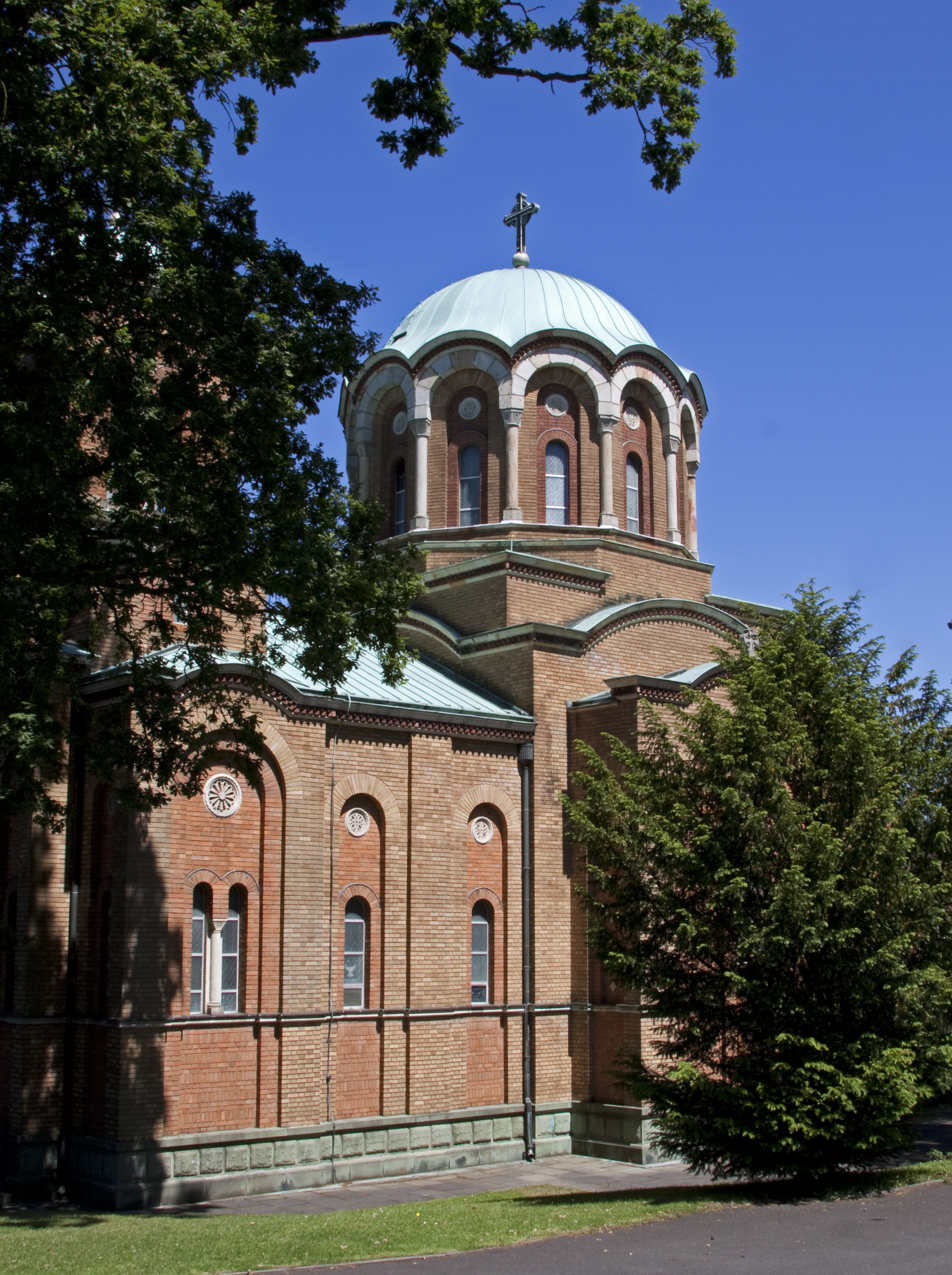
- Saint Prince Lazar Serbian Orthodox Church in Birmingham

Total population
- 12,186 Serbia-born residents (2021-2022 censuses) 70,000–80,000 of Serb ancestry (2001/2012 estimates)

Regions with significant populations
- Greater London, Home counties, West Midlands, West Yorkshire

Languages
- English and Serbian

Religion
- Eastern Orthodoxy (Serbian Orthodox Church)

Serbs in the United Kingdom or British Serbs, (Note: The community is commonly referred to as Serbs in the United Kingdom in English and more rarely as British Serbs. In Serbian, the community is known as Serbs in Great Britain (Срби у Великој Британији, Srbi u Velikoj Britaniji), and more rarely as British Serbs (Британски Срби Срби, Britanski Srbi).) are British citizens of ethnic Serb ancestry and/or Serbia-born persons living in the United Kingdom. According to data from the 2021–2022 UK censuses, there were 12,186 people born in Serbia living in the United Kingdom, while the number of people of Serb ethnicity (including British citizens with full or partial Serb ethnic descent) has been estimated at 70,000 to 80,000.

== History ==
The Serbian diaspora in the United Kingdom is largely made up of post-World War II emigration. It was in the years following the end of the World War II that the first mass Serb immigration to the United Kingdom took place. Following the communist takeover of Yugoslavia, once the Axis powers had been defeated, thousands of anti-communist Yugoslavs fled the country, including several thousand Serbian members of the Royal Yugoslav Army who fought as Chetniks during the war. Also, thousands of Serbs held in German prisoner-of-war camps refused to return home to a communist Yugoslavia, preferring to go into exile. A large number of these were offered settlement in the United Kingdom and were placed in the 130 displaced persons camps scattered throughout the country. Upon entry, they had to decide whether they wanted to work in agriculture, industry or mining. Contracts were signed for a minimum of one year, but most Serbs, due to their lack of knowledge of English, signed them for three years. Agriculture workers were sent to Scotland, while those who worked in textile factories and mines came to Yorkshire or West Midlands.

A second wave of Serb immigrants came in the 1960s, when significant number of "economic migrants" arrived in Great Britain. Their numbers were never as large as the number of post-World War II political immigrants and their contribution to the Serb immigrant community was less public. However, as well as being spurred on by economic opportunities many of them were also looking to start a new life in a free democratic society.

The third wave of immigrants arrived in the early 1990s, mostly young people escaping the Yugoslav Wars and the subsequent economic collapse in Serbia.

== Demographics ==
In the 2021 UK census, a total of 12,186 people were recorded as having been born in Serbia: 11,558 people recorded in England, 156 in Wales, and 59 in Northern Ireland; the census in Scotland was delayed by a year until 2022 and recorded 413 residents born in Serbia. In 2001, the Serbian Embassy estimated that there were 70,000 people with Serb ancestry living in the United Kingdom; an estimate from 2012 claims 80,000.

The 2011 UK census, recorded 8,049 Serbian-born residents in England, 122 in Wales, 188 in Scotland, and 32 in Northern Ireland (a total of 8,391). In response to the ethnicity question, 7,312 people in England, 106 in Wales, and 185 in Scotland wrote in "Serbian" under the "White" heading, as an alternative to ticking one of the pre-defined categories.

The British Serbian community is mainly concentrated in the Greater London (with neighboring Home counties), West Midlands (with hubs in Birmingham and Leicester), and West Yorkshire (Halifax and Bradford).

Serbs in the Unite Kingdom predominantly belong to the Eastern Orthodoxy with the Serbian Orthodox Church as the traditional church. There is Serbian Orthodox diocese, the Serbian Orthodox Eparchy of Britain and Ireland, encompassing 7 parishes across the United Kingdom with churches in London, Birmingham, Bradford, Halifax, Derby, and Leicester.

== Organizations ==
The Serbian Council of Great Britain was established in 2004 to promote the development of the community, particularly through cooperation with exiting community organisations. Since 2008, the organisation has organised Serbian Week which would broaden to become Serbian Month. Typically a series of events held from late January through to the end of February, it has become one of the most successful expositions of culture of its kind within the global Serb diaspora.

The Serbian Society is London-based community organization, formed in 1995 as a response to the needs of a growing Serbian community in London.

== Notable people ==
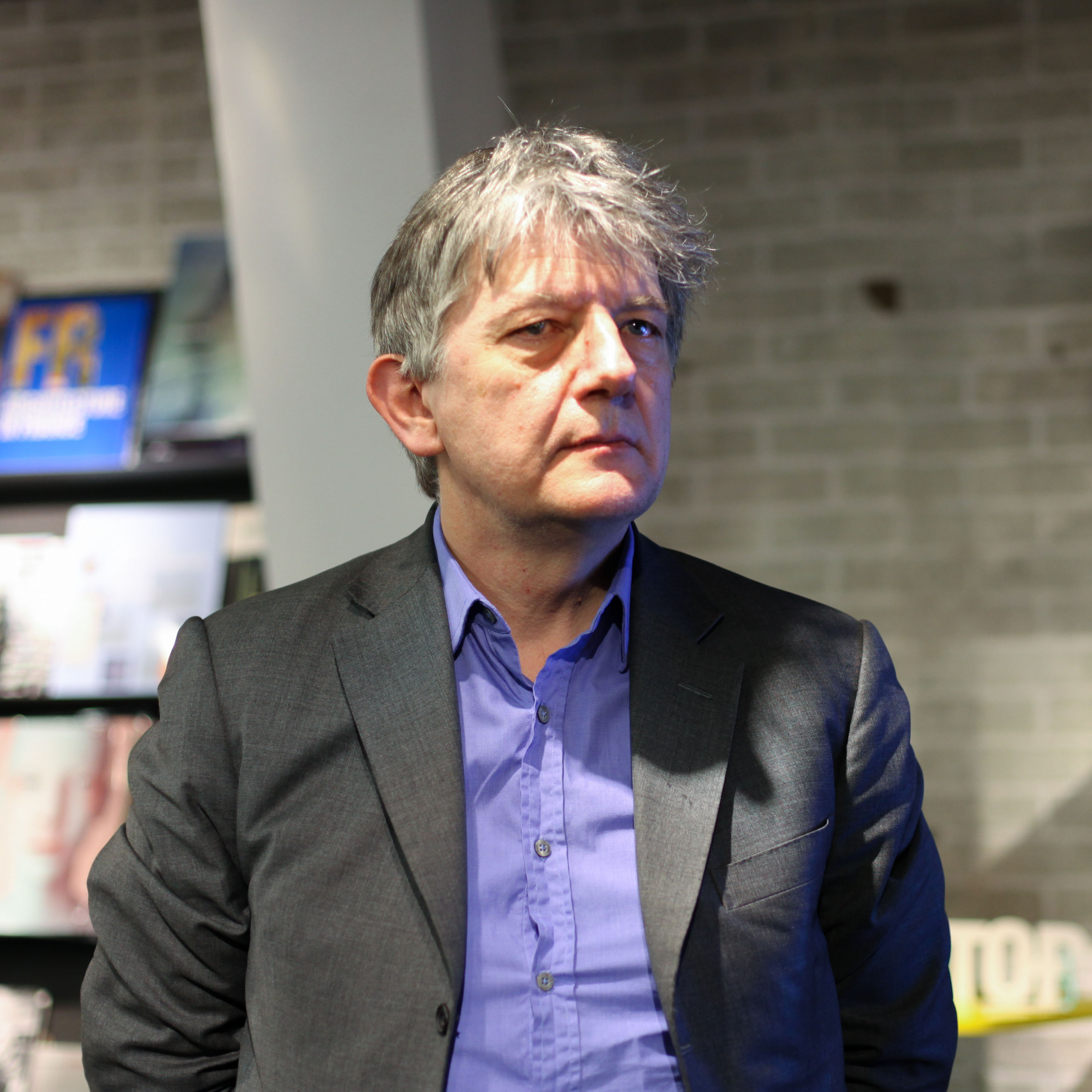
Deyan Sudjic

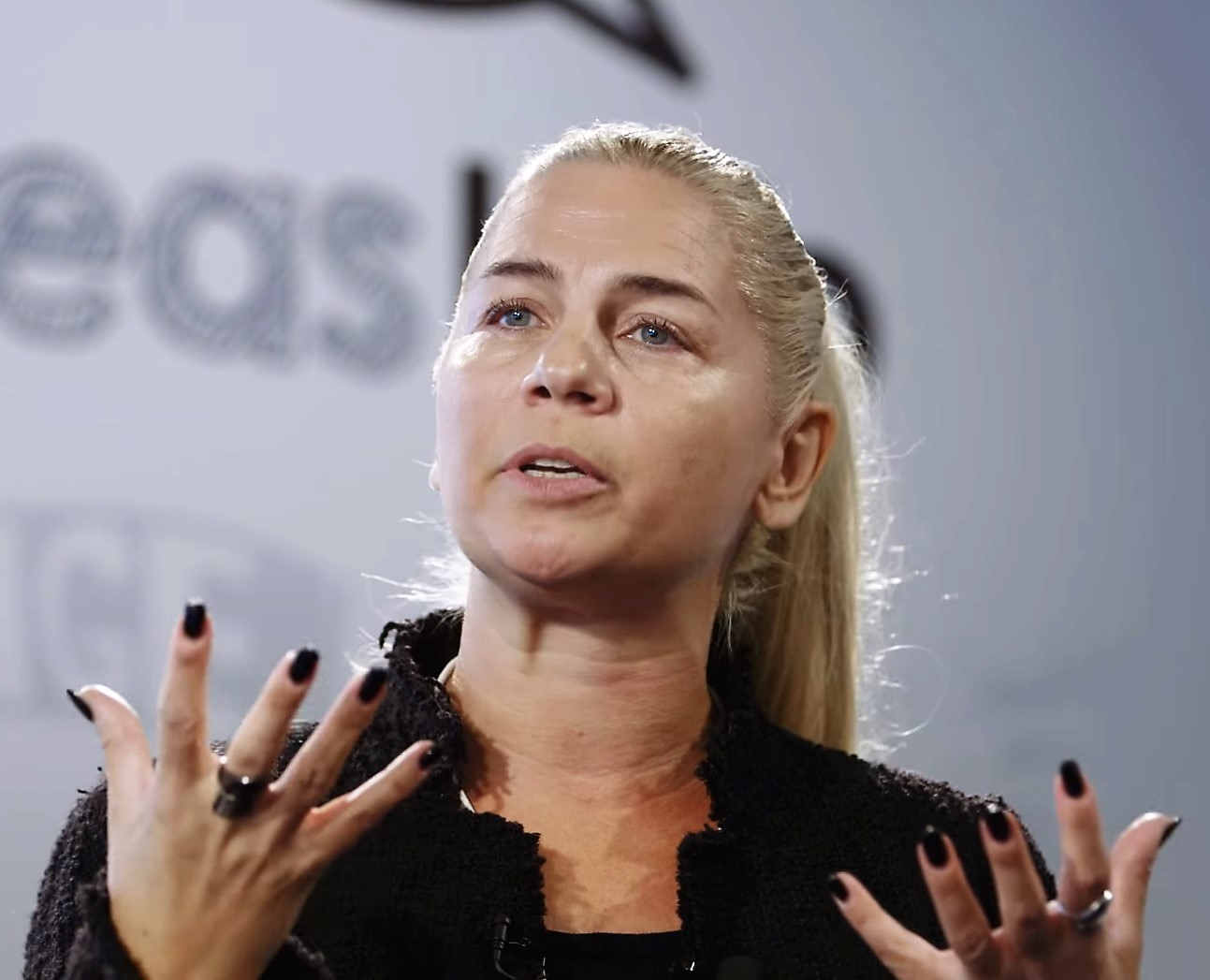
Maja Pantić

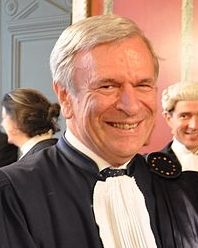
Nicolas Bratza

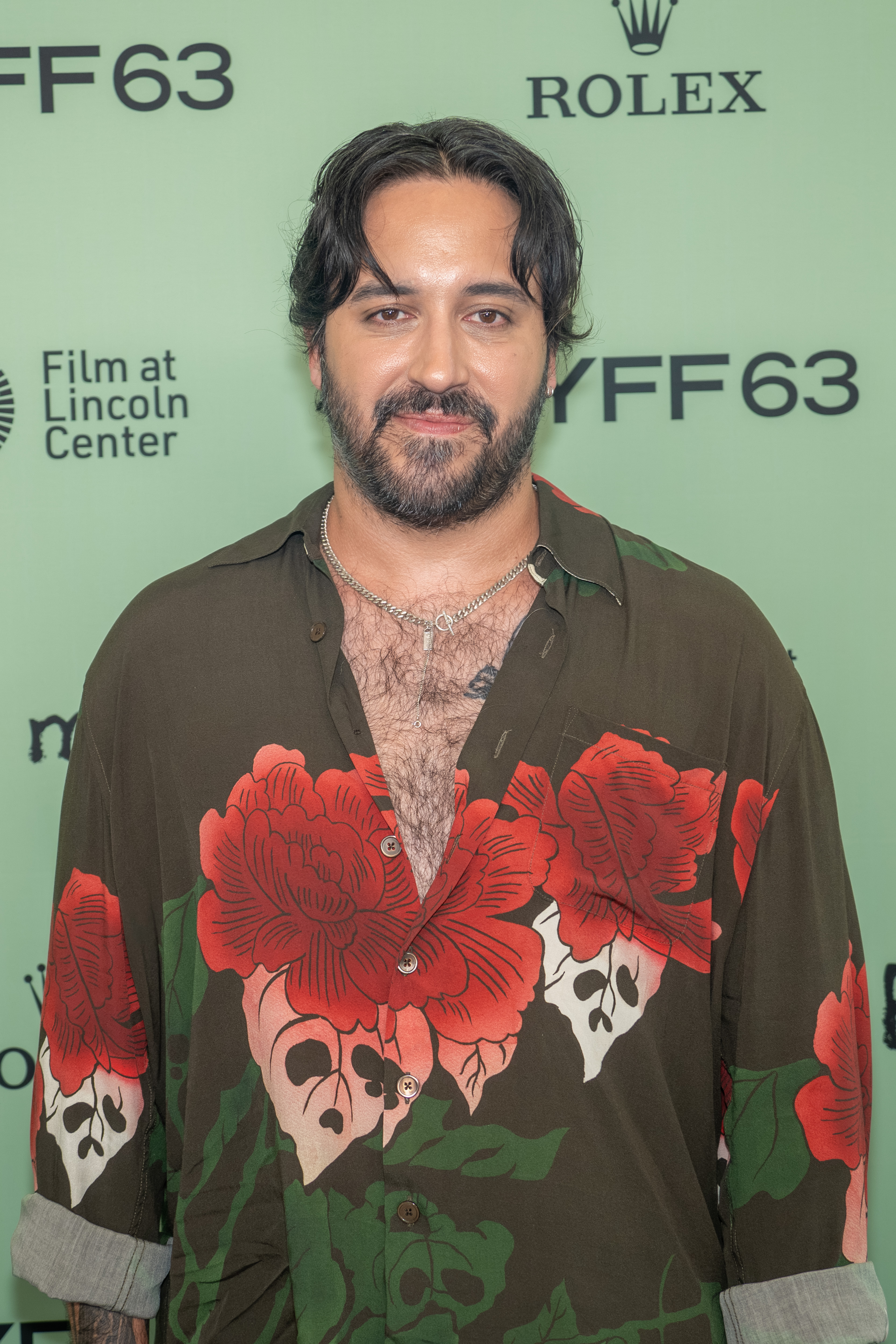
The Haxan Cloak

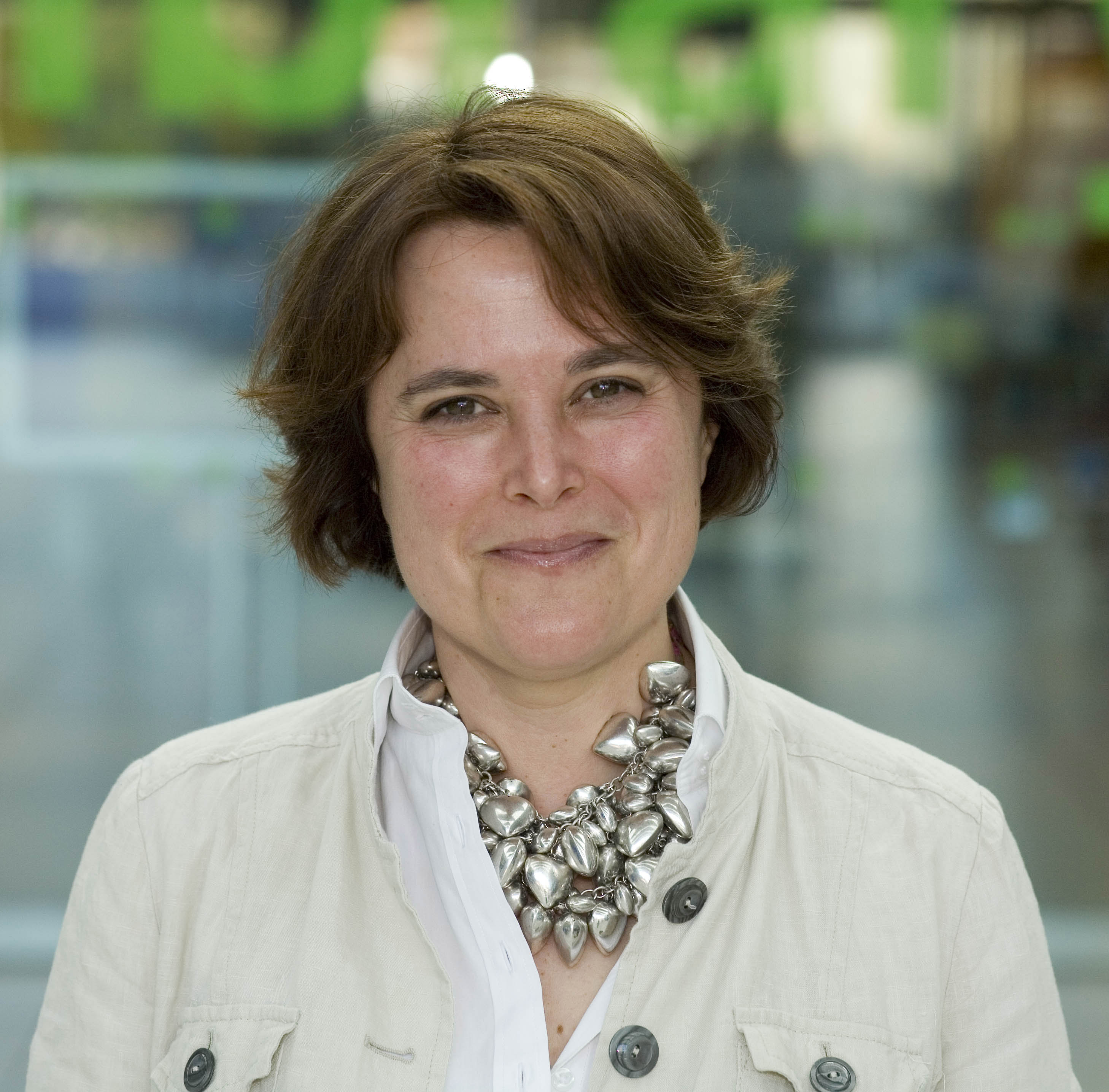
Vesna Goldsworthy

- Milija Aleksic – football player
- Nicolas Bratza – jurist
- Jovan Byford – academic
- Vesna Goldsworthy – poet
- Liam Higgins – rugby league player
- Tessa Kennedy – interior designer
- Roksanda Ilincic – fashion designer
- Vane Ivanovic – diplomat
- Lene Lovich – singer
- John Lukic – football player
- Ian Maitland, 18th Earl of Lauderdale – Scottish peer
- Steve Ogrizovic – football player
- Maja Pantić – scientist
- Stevan K. Pavlowitch – historian
- Abby Rakic-Platt – actress
- Nenad Petrović – writer
- Ana Šekularac – fashion designer
- Milos Stankovic – military officer
- Marko Stanojevic – rugby union player
- Deyan Sudjic – writer and broadcaster
- Olivia Sudjic – writer
- The Haxan Cloak – musician
- Zelda Tinska – actress
- Vlatko Vedral – scientist
- Pete Vuckovic – singer

== See also ==
- Immigration to the United Kingdom
- Serb diaspora
- Serbia–United Kingdom relations
- Serbian Orthodox Eparchy of Britain and Ireland
