= Handlin =

Handlin is a surname. Notable people with the surname include:

- Amy Handlin (born 1956), American politician
- David P. Handlin, American architect and architectural historian
- Denis Handlin (born 1951), Australian entrepreneur and business executive
- Lilian Handlin, American historian
- Mary Flug Handlin (1913–1976), American historian
- Oscar Handlin (1915–2011), American historian
- William Handlin (1885–1953), American football coach

== See also ==
- Meanings of minor planet names: 22001–23000#939
