= Ethnic history =

Ethnic history is a branch of social history that studies ethnic groups and immigrants. Barkan (2007) argues that the field allows historians to use alternate models of interpretation, unite qualitative and quantitative data, apply sociological models to historical patterns, examine more deeply macro-level policies and decisions, and, especially, empathize with the ethnic groups under study.

== Defining the field ==
Ethnic history is especially important in the U.S. and Canada. Oscar Handlin (b. 1915), the director of scores of PhD dissertations at Harvard University was an important pioneer and sponsor of ethnic historiography. Handlin's Pulitzer-prize-winning interpretation, The Uprooted (1951) was highly influential.

Major encyclopedias have helped define the field; Handlin sponsored one published by Harvard University Press in 1980 that received wide media attention because it tied in with an American interest in their roots.

Perin (1983) looks at the historiography of Canadian ethnic history and finds two alternative methodologies. One is more static and emphasizes how closely immigrant cultures replicate the Old World. This approach tends to be filiopietistic. The alternative approach has been influenced by the recent historiography on labor, urban, and family history. It sees the immigrant community as an essentially North American phenomenon and integrates it into the mainstream of Canadian culture.

McDonald (2007) identifies five main areas of interest for scholarship on U.S. ethnic history: the origins and meaning of ethnicity, particularly the issue of whether it is inherited or invented; the origins of ethnic diversity (such as conquest, immigration, involuntary migration); models of ethnic adaptation (especially the Melting Pot, mosaic, salad bowl and kaleidoscope metaphors); ethnic incorporation into the social, economic, and political fabric of the receiving country; and minority group survival strategies, including responses to competing forms of allegiance like class and gender.

Much research is done by reading the letters immigrants wrote to relatives back home, often comparing the advantages and disadvantages of their new lives.

A significant trend has been to integrate ethnic history with other new historiographical tendencies, such as Atlantic history, labor history or women's history.

== Organizations ==
The Immigration and Ethnic History Society was formed in 1965 and publishes a journal for libraries and its 829 members.

- The American Conference for Irish Studies, founded in 1960, has 1,700 members and has occasional publications but no journal.
- The American Italian Historical Association was founded in 1966 and has 400 members; it does not publish a journal
- The American Jewish Historical Society is the oldest ethnic society, founded in 1892; it has 3,300 members and publishes American Jewish History
- The Polish American Historical Association was founded in 1942, and publishes a newsletter and Polish American Studies, an interdisciplinary, refereed scholarly journal twice each year.
- H-ETHNIC is a daily discussion list founded in 1993 with 1400 members; it covers topics of ethnicity and migration globally.

== See also ==
- Emigration from Europe
  - European American
  - White Latin American
- Ethnic groups in the Middle East
- Historical immigration to Great Britain
  - Immigration to the United Kingdom since 1922
- Immigration to Argentina
- Immigration to Australia
- Immigration to Brazil
- Immigration to Canada
- Immigration to Europe
- Immigration to the United States
- Languages of Europe
- List of ethnic groups
- Carl Frederick Wittke
- Oscar Handlin
- Theodore C. Blegen

== Bibliography ==
- Barkan, Elliott R. "Changing Borders, Moving Boundaries: Lessons from Thirty-five Years of Interdisciplinary and Multi-ethnic Research," Journal of American Ethnic History, Jan 2007, Vol. 26 Issue 2, pp 85–99
- Gabaccia, Donna R. and Ruiz, Vicki L., eds. American Dreaming, Global Realities: Rethinking U.S. Immigration History (2006)
- Glazier, Michael, ed. The Encyclopedia of the Irish in America (1999), articles by over 200 experts, covering both Catholics and Protestants.
- Hoerder, Dirk. "Ethnic studies in Canada from the 1880s to 1962: A historiographical perspective and critique," Canadian Ethnic Studies, 1994, Vol. 26 Issue 1, pp 1–18
- Levinson, David. Ethnic Groups Worldwide: A Ready Reference Handbook, (1998), ISBN 978-1-57356-019-1
- McDonald, Jason. American Ethnic History: Themes and Perspectives. (2007) ISBN 978-0-8135-4227-0
- Magocsi, Paul Robert, ed. Encyclopedia of Canada's Peoples (1999), comprehensive scholarly guide to nearly all ethnic groups
- Minahan, James. One Europe, many nations: a historical dictionary of European national groups (2000), ISBN 0-313-30984-1
- Øverland, Orm, ed. Not English Only: Redefining “American” in American Studies (Amsterdam: VU University Press, 2001). 202 pp.
- Palmer, Howard. "Canadian Immigration and Ethnic History in the 1970s and 1980s," International Migration Review, Fall 1981, Vol. 15 Issue 3, pp 471–501
- Thernstrom, Stephan; Orlov, Ann; Handlin, Oscar, eds. Harvard Encyclopedia of American Ethnic Groups. Harvard University Press. ISBN 0674375122.
