= Rowland Berthoff =

American historian (1921–2001)

- Born: Rowland Tappan Berthoff; September 20, 1921; Toledo, Ohio, U.S.
- Died: March 25, 2001 (aged 79)
- Education: Oberlin College; Harvard University
- Occupation: Historian
- Employers: Princeton University; Washington University in St. Louis

Rowland Tappan Berthoff (September 20, 1921 – March 25, 2001) was an American historian, working in the fields of immigration and social life in the USA. He is best known for his 1971 book An Unsettled People: Order and Disorder in American Life.

He was born in Toledo, Ohio, attended Oberlin College, and did graduate work at Harvard University where he received a doctorate in 1952, as a student of Oscar Handlin. Berthoff was an assistant professor of history at Princeton University from 1953, and then a professor of history in Arts and Sciences at Washington University in St. Louis, from 1962. He was made chairman of Washington University's history department and named William Elliott Smith Professor of History in 1971.

He promoted social history and ethnic history. His 1960 article on "The American Social Order: A Conservative Hypothesis" called for a conservative interpretation of American history.

== Publications ==
- Republic of the dispossessed: The exceptional old-European consensus in America (1997) online His last book collects eight of his scholarly articles on the intellectual history of American politics. He identified an American consensus on personal liberty and communal equality, and traces their origins to immigrants who lacked those rights in Europe.
- An Unsettled People: Order and Disorder in American Life (1971) online. This is Berthoff's best-known book, exploring the themes of social order and disorder throughout American history, with attention to how these forces shaped the nation's development.
- British Immigrants in Industrial America, 1790–1950 (1953) online. This revised PhD dissertation examines the experiences and contributions of British immigrants to the industrialization of America, providing a detailed analysis of their adaptation and influence.
- "The American Social Order: A Conservative Hypothesis" (1960). This influential article in the American Historical Review, called for a conservative interpretation of American history and contributed significantly to debates in social history.
