= White British =

Ethnic classification used in the 2011 United Kingdom Census

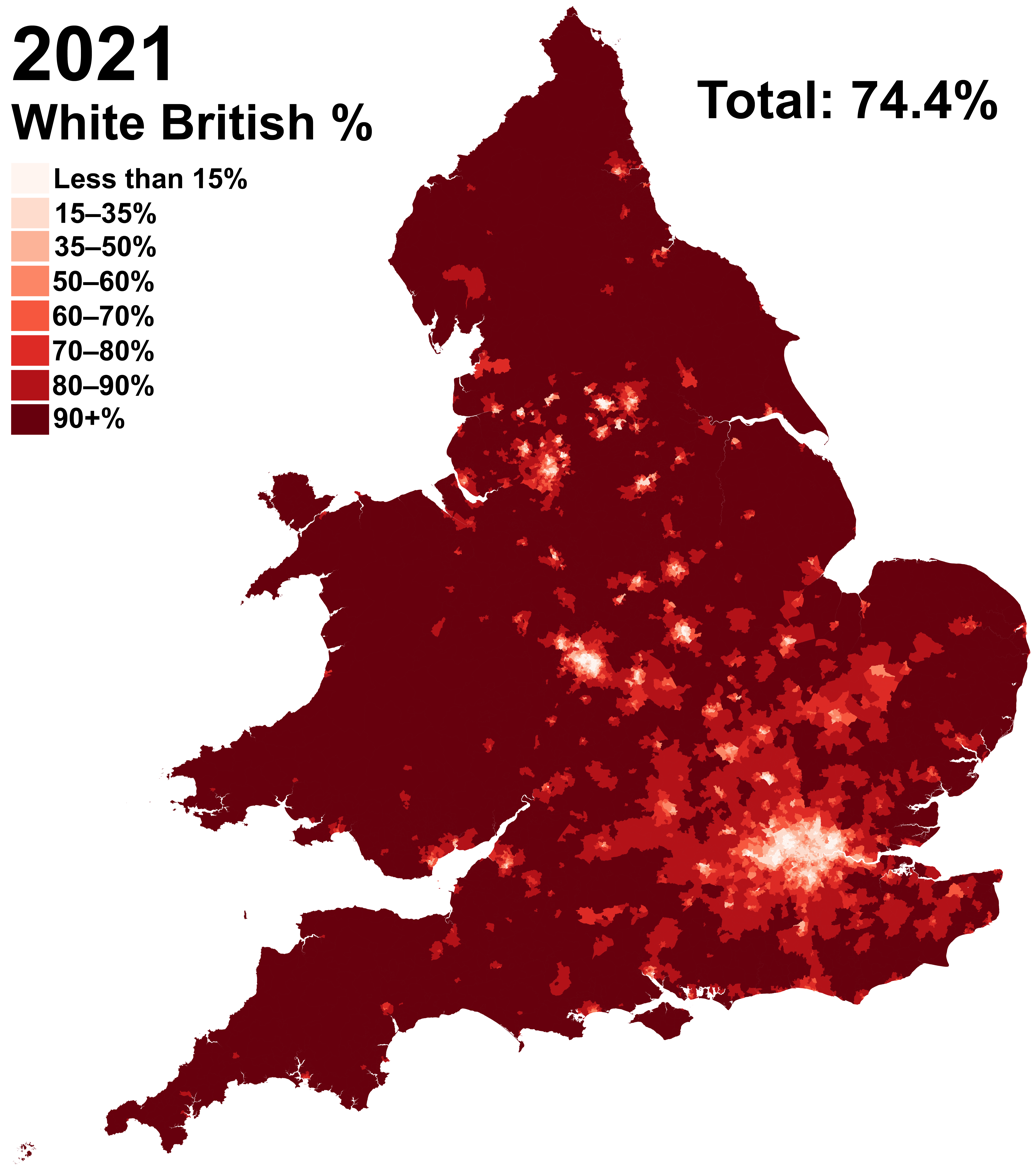
- Geographic distribution of the White British in 2021 (in England and Wales)

Total population
- United Kingdom: 50,858,508 – 76.0% (2021/22 Census); England: 41,540,791 – 73.5% (2021); Scotland: 4,737,319 – 87.1% (2022); Wales: 2,814,427 – 90.9% (2021); Northern Ireland: 1,765,971 – 92.8% (2021) (Note: Including all White people reporting at least one of British/Irish/Northern Irish/English/Scottish/Welsh national identities)

Languages
- Predominantly English; Also: Welsh, Scottish Gaelic, Irish, Scots, Ulster Scots, Cornish, Manx, British Sign Language

Religion
- Predominantly Christianity (50.3%); minority follows other faiths (1.0%) (Note: Including Judaism (0.4%), Islam (0.2%), Buddhism (0.2%), Hinduism (0.01%) and Sikhism (0.01%)) or are irreligious (42.8%); 2021 census, NI, England and Wales only

White British is an ethnicity classification used for the White population identifying as English, Scottish, Welsh, Cornish, Northern Irish, or British in the United Kingdom Census. White British people have historically been the indigenous population of the United Kingdom. In the 2011 census, the White British population was 49,997,686, 81.5% of Great Britain's total population. For the entire United Kingdom, due to different reporting measures within Northern Ireland which includes all those who identified as British with those who identified as Irish, an amalgamated total of 52,320,080 is given. This accounts for 82.8% of the population and includes individuals who identified as White Irish in Great Britain. In the 2021 Census, the White British group numbered 44,355,044 or 74.4% of the population of England and Wales.

== Census classifications ==
For the 2011 census, in England and Wales, the White self-classification option included a subcategory of "English/Welsh/Scottish/Northern Irish/British". In Scotland, the White category included "Scottish" and "Other British" options. In Northern Ireland, the White British classification did not appear, the only choice being 'White'.

The 2011 census for England, Wales and Scotland also included additional White ethnic classifications of White Irish, White Gypsy/Irish Traveller and White Other. There were calls for the 2011 national census in England and Wales to include an extra subcategory so people could identify their ethnic group as Cornish.

For the 2021 census, in England and Wales, the 'Roma' group was added under the 'White' ethnic group.

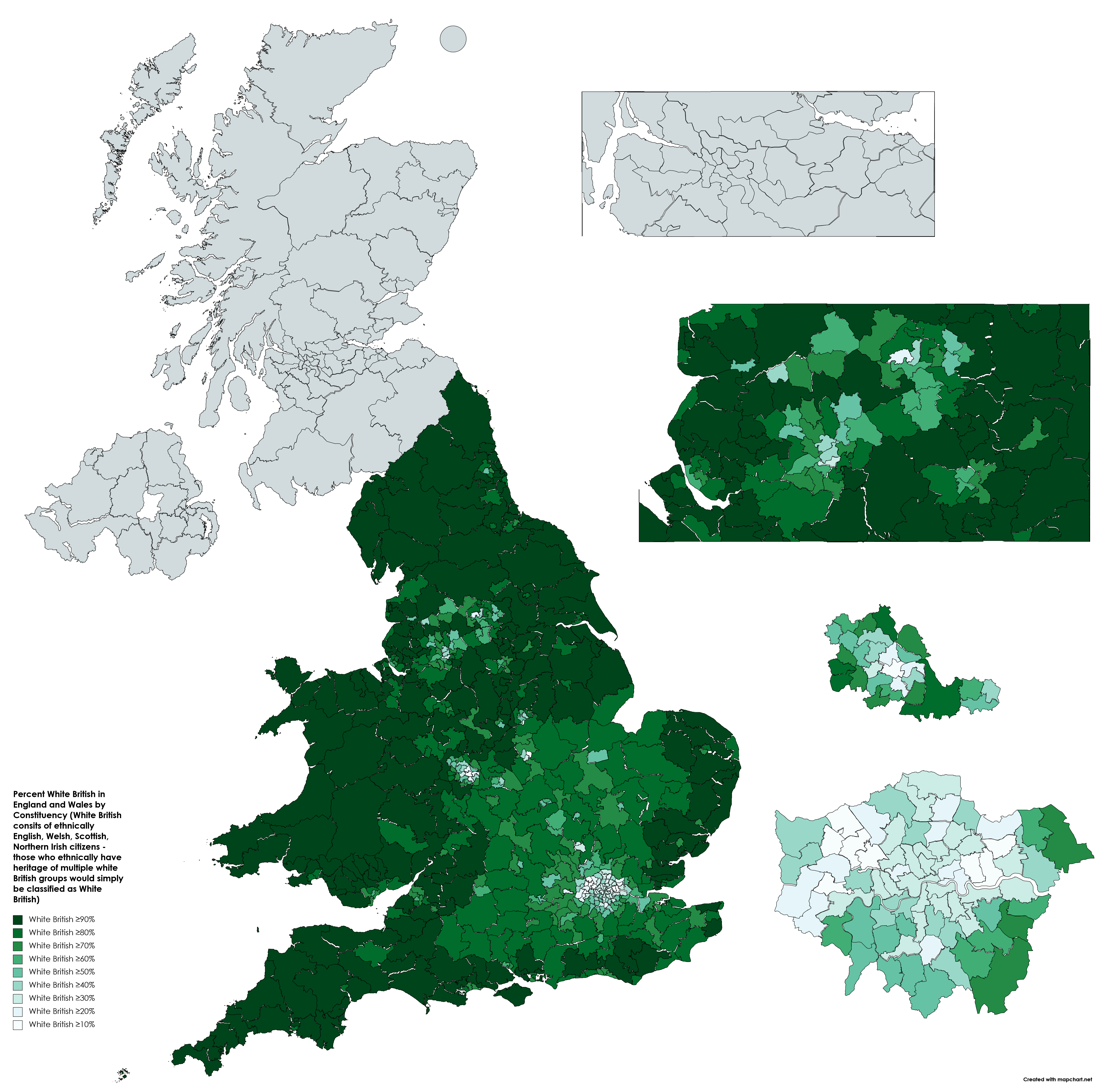
Geographic distribution of the White British by constituency in 2021 (in England and Wales)

== Demographics ==
=== Population and distribution ===
Population pyramid of the White British in 2021

People in the "White British" census classification have their ages more evenly distributed in their population pyramid and have the highest per cent female population of all ethnic-based classifications. The following numbers are based on the 2011 census conducted in each country. In England and Wales, about 64 per cent of the White British classification are between the ages of 16 and 64 while about 18 per cent are under 16 and 19 per cent are over 64. All other census classifications have a higher percentage of their population under 16 and a lower percentage over 64. Of those aged 65 or over, White British are 8 per cent male and 10 per cent female, making them have the lowest per cent male population among all census classifications defined as "ethnic" in the census.

In Scotland, about 65 per cent of the White British classification are between the ages of 16 and 64 while about 17 per cent are under 16 and 18 per cent are over 64. Of those aged 65 or over, White British are 8 per cent male and 10 per cent female, the same percentages as in England and Wales.

In Northern Ireland, about 13 per cent of the White classification are between the ages of 16 and 24 while about 21 per cent are under 16 and 65 per cent are over 24. Of those aged 25 or over, white people are 32 per cent male and 34 per cent female.

According to the 2011 UK Census results, White British people made up the largest percentage of the population in rural areas, such as Allerdale (99.4%) and Copeland (99.3%) in Cumbria, Ryedale (99.4%) in North Yorkshire, North Norfolk (99.2%) and North Devon (99%). Cities across the UK regions with high White British populations included Swansea (91.5%), Kingston Upon Hull (89.7%), Plymouth (92.2%), Darlington (93.7%), Belfast (96.4% – NI classification "white"), Norwich (84.7%), Liverpool (84.8%) and Chelmsford (90.0%). The highest unitary authority with a White British proportion was Redcar and Cleveland (97.6%) followed by Northumberland (97.2%), Hartlepool and County Durham (both 96.6%), Lincolnshire (93%) followed by Nottinghamshire, Norfolk and Worcestershire, all above 92%. Within the London region, Havering had the highest White British percentage with 83.3%, followed by Bromley with 77.4%, Bexley with 77.3% and Richmond upon Thames with 71.4%.

Since the 2011 UK Census was returned, London contained by far the lowest percentage of English and other White British people of all the UK regions, where they made up less than half of the population in 24 of the 32 boroughs, including: Newham (16.7%), Brent (18.0%), Ealing (30.4%), Harrow (30.9%), Hackney (31.2%), Redbridge (35.2%) and Tower Hamlets (36.2%). Despite this, the White British population in London was still higher in numbers than the entirety of Wales or Northern Ireland, owing to London's high overall population. The city with the lowest White British population as a percentage was Leicester (40.9%) – also the only city below 50% – while the lowest for unitary authorities was Slough (34.5%), followed by Luton (44.6%). The local ward with the lowest percentage was Southall Broadway in Ealing (3.5%), followed by Southall Green in Ealing; Green Street East, Green Street West, and East Ham North, all in Newham, which were the only wards below five per cent.

White British population in regions of the UK
United Kingdom NUTS 1 Regions	Year					
United Kingdom NUTS 1 Regions	2001		2011		2021	
United Kingdom NUTS 1 Regions	Number	Percentage	Number	Percentage	Number	Percentage
Northern Ireland (Note: Figure includes all those who identified with British/Irish/Welsh/English/Scottish and Northern Irish and is White.)	1,670,988	99.1%	1,738,604	97.7%	1,765,971	92.8%
Scotland	4,832,756	95.4%	4,863,000	91.9%	4,737,319	87.1%
Wales	2,786,605	96%	2,855,450	93.2%	2,814,427	90.9%
England	42,747,136	87%	42,279,236	79.8%	41,540,791	73.5%
North East England	2,425,592	96.4%	2,431,423	93.6%	2,397,557	90.6%
South West England	4,701,602	95.3%	4,855,676	91.8%	5,008,149	87.8%
North West England	6,203,043	92.1%	6,141,069	87.1%	6,019,385	81.2%
Yorkshire and the Humber	4,551,394	91.6%	4,531,137	85.8%	4,431,265	80.9%
East of England	4,927,343	91.4%	4,986,170	85.3%	4,972,149	78.5%
East Midlands	3,807,731	91.2%	3,871,146	85.4%	3,882,390	79.6%
South East England	7,304,678	91.3%	7,358,998	85.2%	7,315,058	78.8%
West Midlands	4,537,892	86.1%	4,434,333	79.2%	4,275,557	71.8%
Greater London	4,287,861	59.7%	3,669,284	44.9%	3,239,281	36.8%
Overall in the United Kingdom (Note: Figure not in bracket includes White Irish figures, to make Great Britain data and Northern Ireland data comparable over time due to different reporting measures.)	52,728,717 (50,366,497) (Note: Excluding Northern Irish figures entirely, only including those for White British in Great Britain)	89.7% (88.2%)	52,320,080 (49,997,686) (Note: Excluding Northern Irish figures entirely, only including those for White British in Great Britain)	82.8% (81.5%)	50,858,508 (Note: In 2021 and 2022, Scotland held its census a year later after England, Wales and Northern Ireland due to the COVID-19 pandemic. As a result, the data shown is from two separate years.) (49,092,537) (Note: Excluding Northern Irish figures entirely, only including those for White British in Great Britain)	76.0% (Note: In 2021 and 2022, Scotland held its census a year later after England, Wales and Northern Ireland due to the COVID-19 pandemic. As a result, the combined population of the United Kingdom according to the 2021 and 2022 census results was 66,940,563.) (75.5%) (Note: In 2021 and 2022, Scotland held its census a year later after England, Wales and Northern Ireland due to the COVID-19 pandemic. As a result, the combined population of the United Kingdom according to the 2021 and 2022 census results was 65,037,384.)

White British mapped out in local authorities

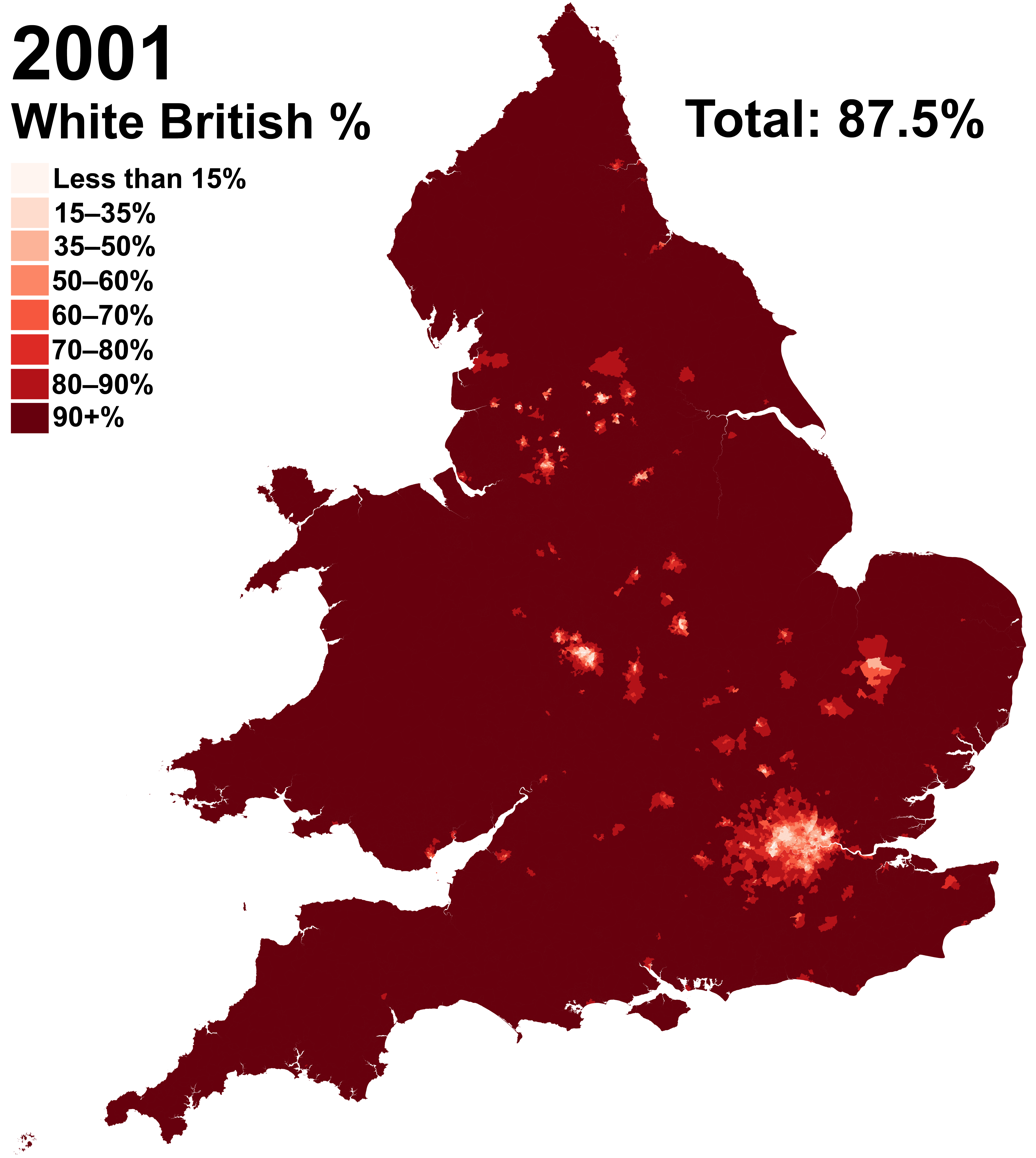
2001 (87.5%)

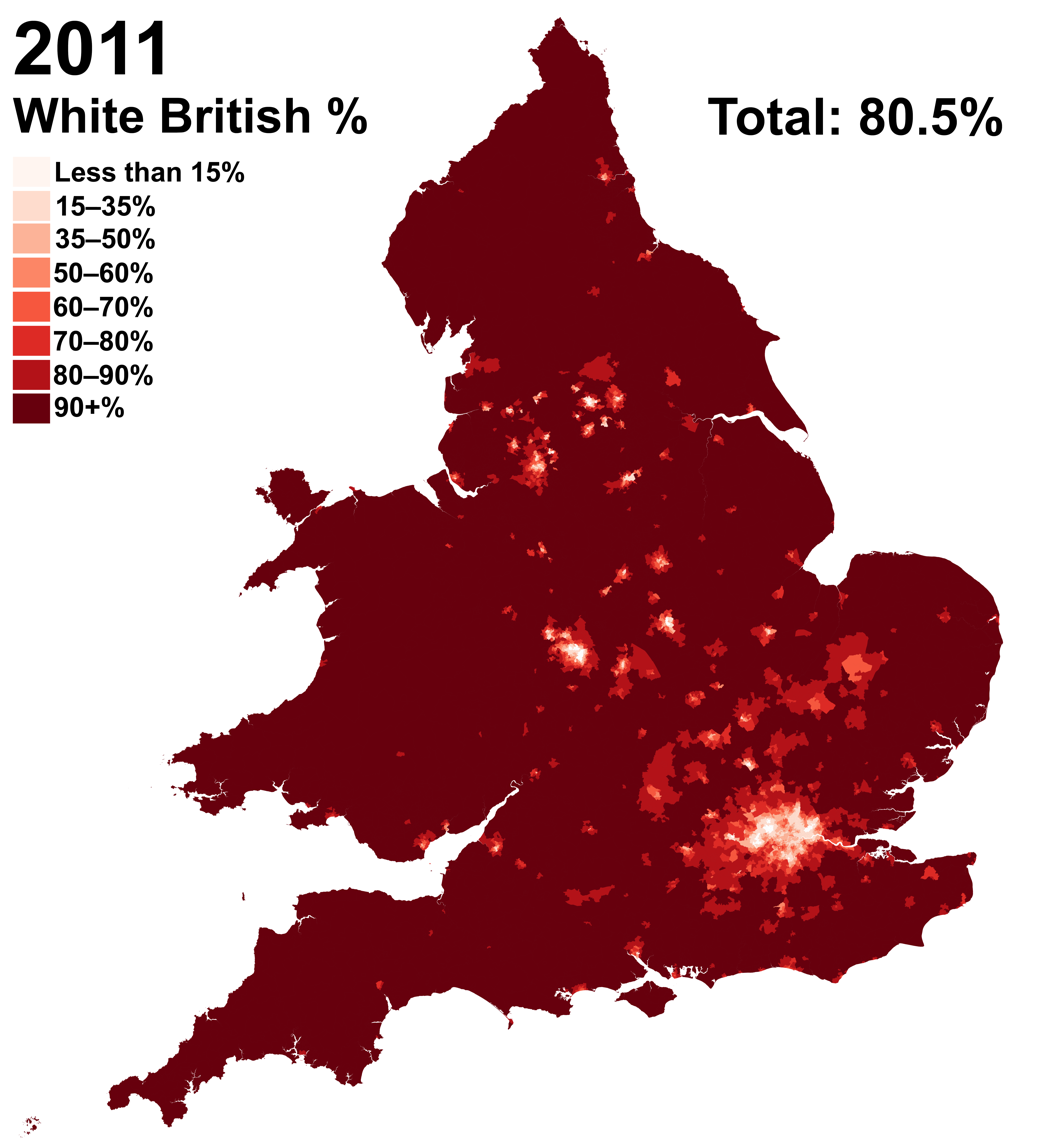
2011 (80.5%)

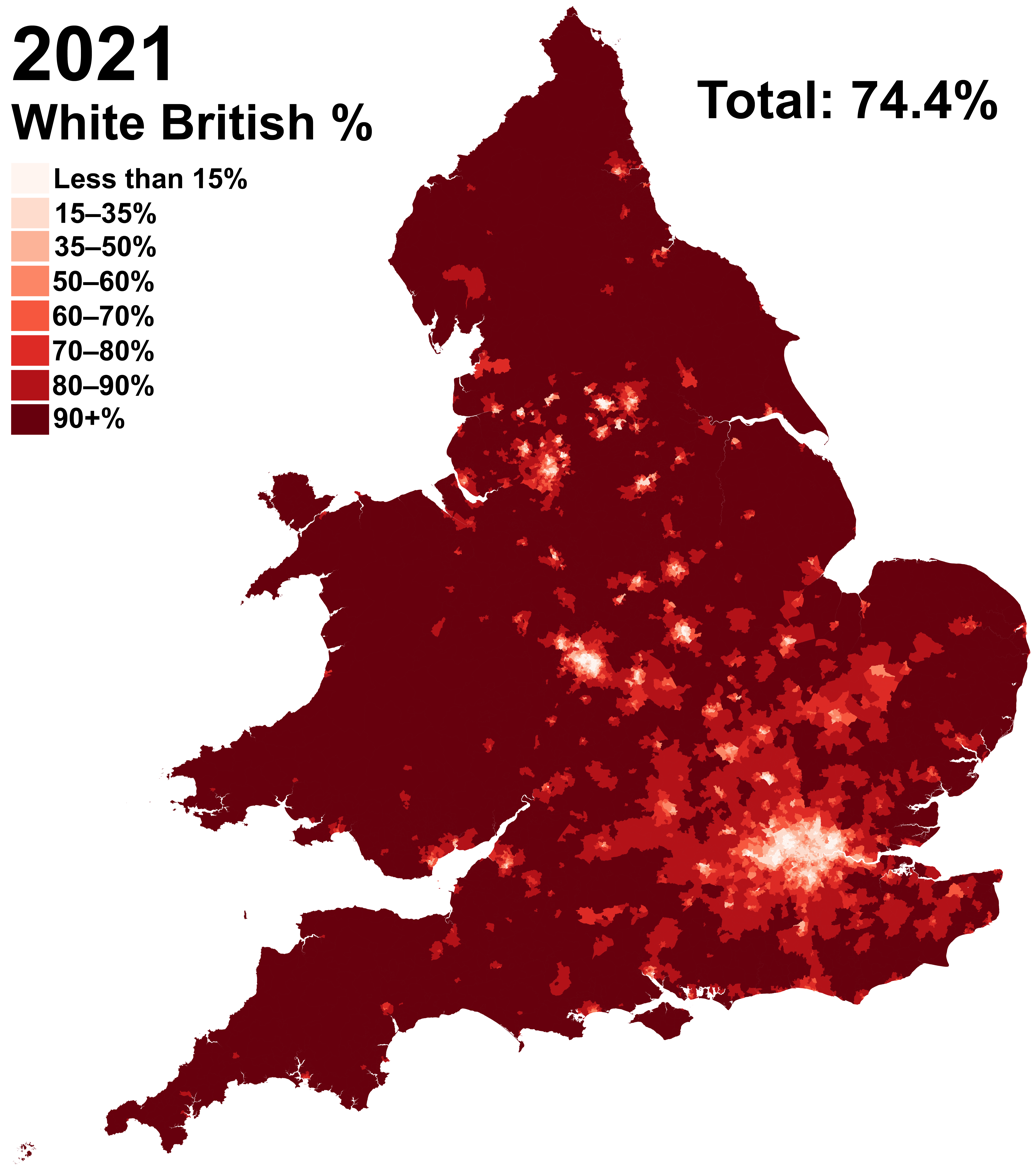
2021 (74.4%)

==== Population by local authority ====
Local authority district (England and Wales)	2021	
Local authority district (England and Wales)	Total	%
Allerdale	92,981	96.7
Copeland	64,851	96.7
Staffordshire Moorlands	92,567	96.6
Redcar and Cleveland	131,789	96.5
Isle of Anglesey	66,339	96.3
Caerphilly	169,356	96.2
Northumberland	308,015	96.1
Torridge	65,452	96.1
Barrow-in-Furness	64,485	95.7
North East Derbyshire	97,657	95.7
Wyre	107,171	95.7
East Lindsey	136,036	95.6
North Norfolk	98,403	95.6
Hambleton	86,678	95.6
Blaenau Gwent	63,990	95.6
Derbyshire Dales	68,326	95.5
Torfaen	87,873	95.2
Rhondda Cynon Taf	226,123	95.1
Hartlepool	87,761	95.0
Amber Valley	119,934	95.0
Ryedale	51,963	95.0
Neath Port Talbot	135,111	95.0
Teignbridge	127,937	94.9
West Devon	54,196	94.9
Powys	126,357	94.9
Eden	51,891	94.8
High Peak	86,183	94.8
County Durham	494,638	94.7
Forest of Dean	82,401	94.7
Pembrokeshire	116,816	94.7
Bridgend	137,755	94.7
East Riding of Yorkshire	323,838	94.6
West Lindsey	89,964	94.5
Cannock Chase	95,019	94.5
Denbighshire	90,470	94.4
North Devon	92,944	94.3
North Kesteven	111,304	94.3
Craven	53,690	94.3
East Devon	142,011	94.2
South Hams	83,481	94.2
Monmouthshire	87,566	94.2
Ribble Valley	57,916	94.1
Conwy	107,926	94.1
Maldon	62,268	94.0
Mid Suffolk	96,581	94.0
Carmarthenshire	176,673	94.0
Dorset	356,270	93.9
Selby	86,380	93.9
Isle of Wight	131,697	93.8
South Lakeland	97,960	93.8
Mid Devon	77,699	93.8
Rochford	80,339	93.8
Isles of Scilly	1,926	93.7
Scarborough	101,848	93.7
Halton	120,301	93.6
Cornwall	533,882	93.6
Broadland	123,265	93.6
Babergh	86,418	93.6
St. Helens	171,546	93.6
Tendring	138,604	93.5
Shropshire	301,918	93.3
Bolsover	74,852	93.3
Malvern Hills	74,197	93.3
Gwynedd	109,548	93.3
Merthyr Tydfil	54,916	93.3
Havant	115,732	93.2
New Forest	163,847	93.2
North Warwickshire	60,598	93.2
Flintshire	144,356	93.2
Chesterfield	96,392	93.1
Fylde	75,793	93.1
East Suffolk	229,063	93.1
Chorley	109,449	93.0
South Tyneside	137,429	93.0
Melton	48,064	92.9
Sunderland	254,655	92.9
Fareham	106,212	92.8
South Ribble	103,089	92.8
West Lancashire	108,998	92.8
Carlisle	102,004	92.7
North East Lincolnshire	145,362	92.6
Castle Point	82,997	92.6
Barnsley	226,488	92.6
Erewash	104,400	92.5
Gosport	75,763	92.5
Richmondshire	46,027	92.5
Wyre Forest	93,961	92.5
North Tyneside	193,303	92.5
Stroud	111,896	92.4
Knowsley	142,698	92.4
Wirral	295,967	92.4
South Staffordshire	101,832	92.2
Torbay	128,375	92.1
North West Leicestershire	96,430	92.1
Cotswold	83,545	92.0
Bassetlaw	108,338	92.0
Lichfield	97,952	92.0
Vale of Glamorgan	121,371	92.0
Ceredigion	65,674	91.9
Wealden	146,968	91.8
South Norfolk	130,292	91.8
Ashfield	115,972	91.8
Mendip	106,608	91.8
Wigan	302,482	91.8
Sefton	256,327	91.8
Rother	85,362	91.7
South Somerset	158,325	91.7
Cheshire West and Chester	325,620	91.2
Sedgemoor	114,340	91.2
Herefordshire, County of	170,419	91.1
Rutland	37,372	91.0
Newark and Sherwood	111,939	91.0
Tamworth	71,456	90.9
Hinckley and Bosworth	103,225	90.8
Harrogate	147,479	90.7
Wrexham	122,547	90.7
Wychavon	120,048	90.6
East Hampshire	113,814	90.5
South Kesteven	129,741	90.5
Somerset West and Taunton	142,560	90.5
Blackpool	127,445	90.4
North Somerset	195,915	90.4
Braintree	140,283	90.4
Rossendale	64,073	90.4
Bromsgrove	89,676	90.4
Stockton-on-Tees	177,526	90.3
Darlington	97,320	90.3
Tewkesbury	85,720	90.3
Dover	105,111	90.3
Gateshead	177,131	90.3
Wiltshire	459,594	90.1
South Derbyshire	96,634	90.1
Stratford-on-Avon	121,330	90.1
Chichester	111,822	90.1
Newcastle-under-Lyme	110,947	90.0
Stafford	123,203	90.0
Cheshire East	357,337	89.6
Plymouth	236,802	89.5
West Oxfordshire	101,648	89.0
Lewes	88,830	88.9
Uttlesford	81,245	88.9
Great Yarmouth	88,663	88.9
Adur	57,390	88.9
King's Lynn and West Norfolk	136,966	88.8
North Lincolnshire	150,554	88.7
Breckland	125,516	88.7
Arun	146,178	88.7
Swale	134,385	88.6
Tonbridge and Malling	116,787	88.3
Rotherham	234,613	88.3
Wakefield	311,634	88.2
Warrington	185,940	88.1
Eastleigh	120,242	88.1
Winchester	112,304	88.1
Horsham	129,348	88.1
Test Valley	114,873	88.0
Folkestone and Hythe	96,590	88.0
Lancaster	125,552	87.8
Harborough	85,474	87.6
Swansea	208,703	87.5
York	176,963	87.3
Thanet	122,796	87.3
Mansfield	96,475	87.3
Hart	86,414	86.9
Waverley	111,321	86.8
Doncaster	266,879	86.6
East Cambridgeshire	75,897	86.5
Rushcliffe	102,479	86.1
Fenland	88,028	85.9
South Gloucestershire	249,160	85.8
South Oxfordshire	127,890	85.8
Mole Valley	74,983	85.8
Mid Sussex	130,971	85.8
Bath and North East Somerset	165,478	85.6
West Berkshire	138,253	85.6
Sevenoaks	103,116	85.6
Gedling	100,367	85.6
Huntingdonshire	154,089	85.2
Hastings	77,418	85.1
Worthing	94,680	85.0
East Hertfordshire	127,245	84.7
Broxtowe	93,718	84.5
South Holland	80,244	84.4
Tunbridge Wells	97,049	84.2
Kingston upon Hull, City of	223,962	83.9
Central Bedfordshire	245,769	83.5
Tandridge	73,343	83.5
Stockport	245,831	83.4
Cheltenham	98,932	83.3
Vale of White Horse	115,517	83.2
Chelmsford	150,758	83.1
Telford and Wrekin	153,936	83.0
Exeter	108,095	82.7
Brentwood	63,696	82.7
Lincoln	85,891	82.7
Worcester	85,868	82.7
Calderdale	170,983	82.7
Ashford	109,673	82.6
Canterbury	129,887	82.5
Bournemouth, Christchurch and Poole	329,609	82.4
Redditch	71,742	82.4
Tameside	190,305	82.4
Dudley	266,564	82.4
Blaby	84,746	82.3
West Suffolk	147,935	82.2
Eastbourne	83,465	82.1
Basildon	154,045	82.1
Maidstone	144,114	82.0
Basingstoke and Deane	151,572	81.9
Nuneaton and Bedworth	109,807	81.8
Southend-on-Sea	147,442	81.6
North Hertfordshire	108,298	81.3
Colchester	155,488	80.7
North Northamptonshire	289,274	80.5
Newport	128,245	80.4
South Cambridgeshire	128,985	79.6
Hyndburn	65,471	79.6
Middlesbrough	114,421	79.5
Dacorum	122,107	78.7
Stoke-on-Trent	202,906	78.5
Medway	218,953	78.3
East Staffordshire	97,019	78.2
Bury	151,528	78.2
Gloucester	103,317	78.0
Burnley	73,752	77.9
Charnwood	143,345	77.9
Cherwell	125,422	77.9
Surrey Heath	70,473	77.9
Solihull	168,398	77.9
Bracknell Forest	96,950	77.8
Portsmouth	161,664	77.7
Norwich	111,623	77.6
Guildford	111,076	77.3
Liverpool	375,785	77.3
Reigate and Banstead	115,949	76.9
Warwick	112,650	75.9
Epping Forest	101,994	75.6
Stevenage	67,394	75.3
West Northamptonshire	319,509	75.1
Rugby	85,684	74.9
Ipswich	104,208	74.6
Boston	52,540	74.5
Sheffield	414,698	74.5
Newcastle upon Tyne	223,567	74.5
Swindon	173,231	74.2
Elmbridge	102,867	74.1
Salford	199,614	74.0
Brighton and Hove	204,831	73.9
Cardiff	266,533	73.6
St Albans	108,962	73.5
Leeds	595,737	73.4
Harlow	67,993	72.9
Wokingham	129,087	72.7
Buckinghamshire	401,489	72.6
Runnymede	63,965	72.6
Trafford	169,550	72.1
Bristol, City of	338,452	71.6
Rushmoor	70,917	71.1
Kirklees	305,579	70.5
Rochdale	156,669	70.0
Epsom and Ewell	56,136	69.4
Spelthorne	71,261	69.2
Windsor and Maidenhead	105,991	69.1
Bolton	203,486	68.8
Broxbourne	67,891	68.6
Gravesham	73,030	68.3
Southampton	169,481	68.1
Three Rivers	63,706	67.9
Walsall	191,529	67.4
Dartford	78,557	67.3
Woking	69,911	67.3
Welwyn Hatfield	80,551	67.2
Bromley	219,493	66.5
Havering	174,232	66.5
Derby	173,077	66.2
Thurrock	116,430	66.2
Pendle	63,320	66.1
Preston	97,715	66.1
Oldham	157,914	65.2
Bexley	158,842	64.4
Bedford	118,779	64.1
Hertsmere	68,032	63.1
Richmond upon Thames	123,093	63.0
Milton Keynes	178,568	62.2
Crawley	73,178	61.8
Oadby and Wigston	34,512	59.8
Peterborough	128,353	59.5
Nottingham	185,580	57.3
Wandsworth	157,048	57.2
Blackburn with Darwen	87,997	56.9
Bradford	309,912	56.7
Coventry	190,889	55.3
Wolverhampton	144,303	54.7
Kingston upon Thames	90,288	53.7
Reading	93,167	53.5
Oxford	86,672	53.5
Cambridge	77,195	53.0
Sandwell	177,929	52.1
Manchester	268,572	48.7
Sutton	120,014	48.0
Watford	46,820	45.8
Birmingham	491,211	42.9
City of London	3,649	60.5
Greenwich	119,665	53.4
Merton	88,673	41.2
Islington	86,092	49.7
Hammersmith and Fulham	70,105	38.3
Lambeth	119,395	37.6
Croydon	146,268	37.4
Lewisham	111,726	37.2
Hillingdon	113,377	37.1
Barnet	140,777	36.2
Southwark	109,253	35.5
Camden	74,348	35.4
Waltham Forest	94,766	34.0
Hackney	87,927	22.9
Leicester	122,395	33.2
Kensington and Chelsea	46,883	32.7
Haringey	84,298	31.9
Luton	71,532	31.8
Enfield	103,140	31.3
Barking and Dagenham	67,550	30.9
Hounslow	81,933	28.4
Westminster	77,334	52.0
Ealing	89,265	24.3
Slough	38,101	24.0
Redbridge	71,844	23.2
Tower Hamlets	71,177	22.9
Harrow	53,567	20.5
Brent	51,611	15.2
Newham	51,819	14.8
Total
Total	44,355,218	74.4%

==== Population in metropolitan counties ====
Population in counties in 2011

West Yorkshire

West Midlands

Greater Manchester (79.84% White British)

==== Population in city districts ====
Population in city districts in 2011

London (45.5% White British)

Leicester (45.06% White British)

Birmingham (53.14% White British)

Bradford (63.86% White British)

Bristol (77.86% White British)

Leeds (81.13% White British)

Sheffield (80.85% White British)

Luton (44.52% White British)

Nottingham (65.46% White British)

Coventry (66.63% White British)

Slough (34.52% White British)

==== Population in school children ====
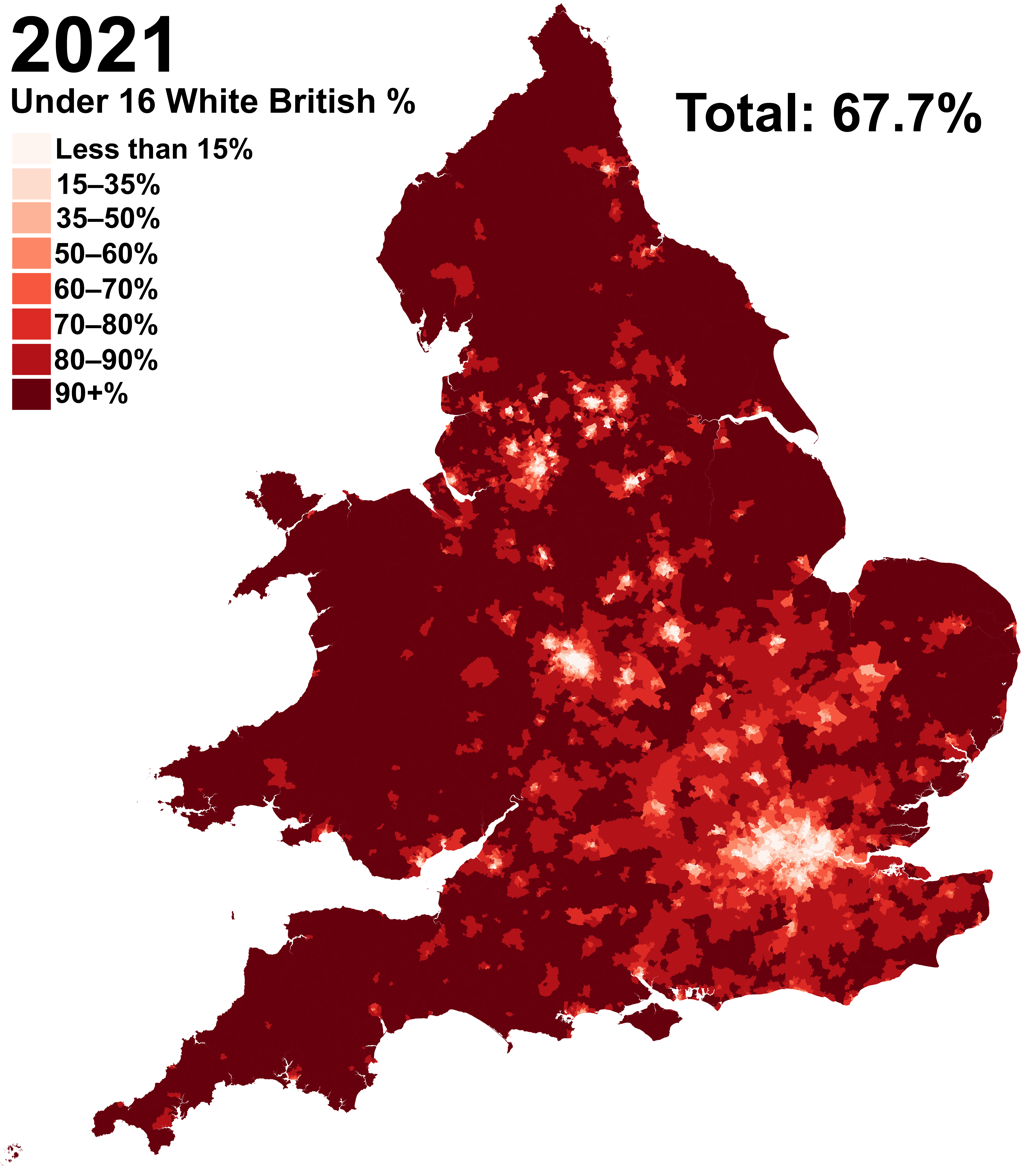
White British percentage of the under 16 population

White British school children within England for the school year of 2021/2022

Proportion of White British school children in England
Ethnic group	School year	
Ethnic group	2024/2025	
Ethnic group	Number	%
White: Total	5,751,893	68.1%
White: British	5,096,013	60.4%

==== Population in births ====
Proportion of White British births in England and Wales
Ethnic Group	Year									
Ethnic Group	2005		2011		2015		2019		2025	
Ethnic Group	Number	%	Number	%	Number	%	Number	%	Number	%
White: Total	451,514	69.5% (80.3%)	536,021	74.49%	507,829	72.29%	452,248	70.67%	366,839	62.8%
White: British	418,052	64.4% (75.2%) (Note: Report states that births in which no ethnicity was stated were usually White British. If assumptions about all non-stated births are actually White British, the percentage of the group rises to 75.2% of births in 2005 and 80.3% White overall.)	476,328	66.19%	432,114	62.05%	374,056	58.45%	310,456	53.1%
Not stated	70,303	10.8%	22,848	3.17%	22,041	3.16%	25,578	4.00%	15,671	2.7%

=== Country of birth ===
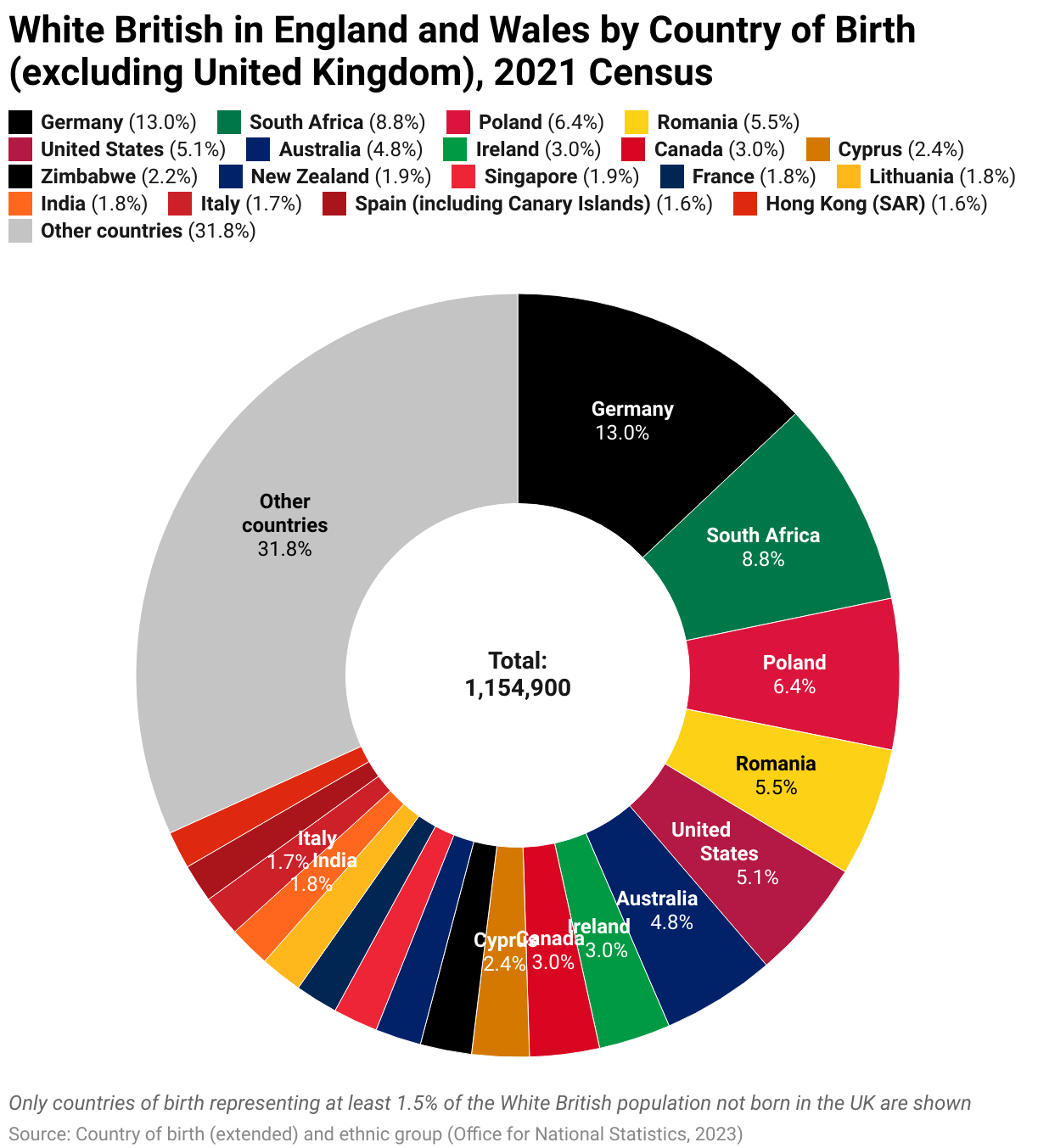
Country of birth (2021 census, England and Wales)

The 2021 census for England and Wales recorded a population of over 43.20 million White British born in the United Kingdom, representing the main birthplace of the majority (97.4%) of those who identified as White British. The remaining 1.15 million White British living in England and Wales were born in countries outside of the United Kingdom. The most common countries of birth were Germany (149,838), South Africa (101,425), Poland (73,685), Romania (63,101) and the United States (59,036).

== Economic status and education ==
According to official UK Government figures from 2016, the employment rate for White British people stood at 75%, with the overall employment rate in the UK standing at 74%. UK Government figures also demonstrate that 31% of White British people work in professional and managerial occupations, higher than the Mixed (30%), Pakistani/Bangladeshi (27%) and Black (25%) groups, but lower than the Indian ethnic group (43%).

At GCSE level, official UK Government statistics state that 63% of White British pupils attained A* to C grades in English and Mathematics in the 2015–16 academic year, higher than Black Caribbean (51%) and Pakistani (58%) pupils, but lower than Bangladeshi (67%), Indian (77%) and Chinese (83%) pupils. According to a report by the Sutton Trust, "White working class pupils achieve the lowest grades at GCSE of any main ethnic group, with just a quarter of boys and a third of girls achieving 5 good GCSEs." At A-Level, in the 2015–16 academic year, 11% of White British pupils achieved at least 3 'A' grades at A-Level; the only major ethnic groups to achieve the same benchmark at a higher rate were Indian (14%) and Chinese (24%) pupils.

According to Department for Education statistics for the 2020–21 academic year, White British pupils attained slightly below the national average for academic performance at both A-Level and GCSE. 25.9% of White British pupils achieved at least 3 As at A Level and an average score of 50.2 was achieved in Attainment 8 scoring at GCSE level. White British pupils eligible for free school meals, a measurement of socioeconomic status, are found to be the largest disadvantaged group in education across the early years, GCSE performance and access to higher education. Since 2007, out of all ethnicities aged 18 years old who have received a state education, white pupils have had the lowest rate of entry into higher education and have also seen the lowest rate of increase, from 21.8% in 2007 to 33.3% in 2021. For comparison, 72.1% of Chinese pupils and 48.6% of Black pupils gained a higher education place in the same year.

Percentage of students getting at least 3 A grades at A level (2020/21)
Ethnic group	%
Chinese	42.2
Indian	33.2
All ethnic groups (average)	28.9
White (including White British)	26.0
Mixed	25.8
Bangladeshi	21.4
Pakistani	17.7
Black	16.5
Gypsy/Roma	10.8

Average GCSE Attainment 8 score (out of 90.0) (2020/21)
Ethnic group	Score
Chinese	69.2
Indian	62.0
Bangladeshi	55.6
Mixed	51.3
All ethnic groups (average)	50.9
Pakistani	50.5
White (including White British)	50.2
Black	50.0
Gypsy/Roma	22.7

Percentage of pupils getting a grade 5 or above in English and maths GCSE (2020/21)
Ethnic group	%
Chinese	83.8
Indian	72.4
Bangladeshi	60.6
All ethnic groups (average)	51.9
Mixed	51.5
White (including White British)	50.9
Pakistani	50.3
Black	48.9
Gypsy/Roma	9.1

== Health ==
Research conducted on behalf of the Commission on Race and Ethnic Disparities in 2021 showed that white people have the highest rate of cancer in the United Kingdom. In 2024 it was also found that whites had the highest suicide rate of any ethnic group in the UK.

== Religion ==
Statistically, White British are more likely to be Christian than other ethnic-based classifications other than Black and Roma British. According to the 2011 UK Census, White British are 64% Christian in England and Wales, mostly Anglican in England, while the percentage for all groups is about 59%. The percentage of White British who are Christians is lower in Scotland, at 55% (mainly Presbyterian there), whereas at least 54% of all Scots are Christian. The British country with the highest percentage is Northern Ireland, where white people are 94% Christian, while 93% of all usual residents are. About 27% of the White British population in England and Wales, and 36% in Scotland reported having "no religion". In Northern Ireland, the lowest percentage of white people who reported "no religion" in the census is about 5%. The 27% and 36% per cent figures for "no religion" are about the same for all groups. About 7% of the White British in England and Wales, and Scotland declined to state any religion.

Religion	England and Wales					
Religion	2001		2011		2021	
Religion	Number	%	Number	%	Number	%
Christianity	34,576,389	75.9%	28,738,688	63.7%	21,747,631	49.0%
No religion	7,033,407	15.4%	12,624,325	28.0%	19,480,022	43.9%
Judaism	218,324	0.5%	202,600	0.4%	181,738	0.4%
Islam	63,042	0.1%	77,272	0.2%	90,939	0.2%
Buddhism	50,408	0.1%	72,423	0.2%	74,908	0.2%
Hinduism	5,820	0.0%	6,909	0.0%	5,145	0.0%
Sikhism	6,192	0.0%	5,417	0.0%	2,616	0.0%
Not Stated	3,471,290	7.6%	3,238,911	7.2%	2,575,113	5.8%
Other religions	108,869	0.2%	168,141	0.4%	196,926	0.4%
Total	45,533,741	100%	45,134,686	100%	44,355,038	100%

== See also ==
- White people in the United Kingdom
- Other White
- Ethnic groups in the United Kingdom
- Demographics of the United Kingdom
- Demographics of England
- Demographics of Scotland
- Demographics of Wales
- Demographics of Northern Ireland
- List of United Kingdom censuses
- Classification of ethnicity in the United Kingdom
- National Statistics Socio-economic Classification
- Genetic history of the British Isles
- Historical immigration to Great Britain
- List of English districts and their ethnic composition
