= Settlement of Great Britain and Ireland =

Settlement of Great Britain and Ireland may refer to:

- Historical immigration to Great Britain
- Plantations of Ireland, in 16th and 17th century land was confiscated by the English Crown and Commonwealth and which was then colonised by settlers from England and the Scottish Lowlands.
- Plantation of Ulster, the organised colonisation (plantation) of Ulster – a province of Ireland – by people from Scotland and England.
- Immigration to the United Kingdom since 1922
