= Egyptians Act 1554 =

Act of the Parliament of England

- Act of Parliament
- Parliament of England
- Long title: An acte for the punishement of certayne Persons calling themselves Egiptians.
- Citation: 1 & 2 Ph. & M. c. 4
- Territorial extent: England and Wales

Dates
- Royal assent: 16 January 1555
- Commencement: 12 November 1554 (Note: Start of session.)
- Repealed: 21 July 1856

Other legislation
- Amended by: Egyptians Act 1562
- Repealed by: Repeal of Obsolete Statutes Act 1856
- Relates to: Egyptians Act 1530; Vagabonds Act 1547

Status: Repealed

Text of statute as originally enacted

Egyptians Act 1562
- Act of Parliament
- Parliament of England
- Long title: An Act for further Punishment of Vagabonds, calling themselves Egyptians.
- Citation: 5 Eliz. 1. c. 20
- Territorial extent: England and Wales

Dates
- Royal assent: 10 April 1563
- Commencement: 11 January 1563
- Repealed: 24 June 1783

Other legislation
- Amends: Egyptians Act 1554
- Repealed by: Egyptians Act 1783
- Relates to: Egyptians Act 1530

Status: Repealed

Text of statute as originally enacted

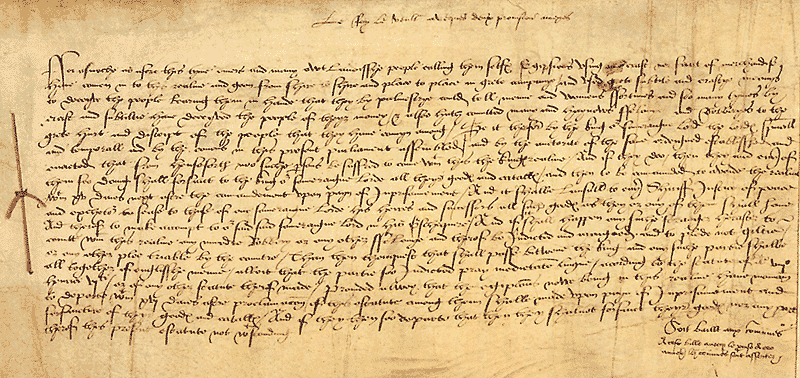
The original "Act Concerning Egyptians" of 1531. "The act of 1554 reiterated the previous statute and made clear that 'Egyptians' were not English."

The Egyptians Act 1554 (1 & 2 Ph. & M. c. 4) was an act of the Parliament of England regarding Romani and travellers within the realm. The act was passed to amend previous laws regarding the Romani people. The Egyptians Act 1530 did not cover Gypsies who were born in England or those who came to England by way of Scotland.

The act included fines on English people who were smuggling Gypsies into the country as a way to curb some of the illegal immigration. Punishments for Romani people caught in England were deportation on pain of execution. However, those who were no longer nomads and settled in one spot were not subjected to such legislation.

The primary objective of the law was to end the "naughty, idle and ungodly life and company", of Gypsies by either forcing them to settle down, exit the realm, or face potential death at the will of the Crown.

== The subjects of the act ==
In early modern England, for both leaders and subjects of the realm alike, there was a disdain for a group of people collectively known in the eyes of the law as "Egyptians" or "Counterfeit Egyptians", but were commonly referred to as ‘Gypsies’ during this period of time. According to David Cressy of Ohio State University, the Egyptians present in England at the time personified the opposite of the status quo. They were considered ‘wanderers’, not belonging to a particular church, parish, or legitimate occupation. This was a counterintuitive way of life with respect to the organization and structural hierarchy that accompanied virtually all aspects of English life at the time. The ‘Egyptians’ represented a company of people who were marginalized through law and everyday life due to their departure from the societal norms that were present in early modern England.

Though there is still debate regarding who exactly the term "Egyptian" encompassed with respect to the law, it is commonly agreed upon this was a reference to the Romani People, an Indo-Aryan, nomadic group of people who travelled across continental Europe and the Ottoman Empire. "Egyptian" was also commonly used as a self-descriptor, which adds difficulty when attempting to identify whom exactly the term was referring to. Outside of the Romani People, it is likely referring to vagabonds, wanderers, and people who lived the lifestyle similar to the Romani People within the realm at the time.

There is no concrete and reliable evidence regarding the initial arrival of Egyptians (referring to people called Egyptians, not natives of the country Egypt) in England. However, it is thought that Egyptians first arrived in the early 16th century, during the reign of Henry VII, the first Tudor. The content of gentry books owned by Sir John Arundell of Lanhere, mention him paying a fee of 20d to "the Egyptians when they danced afore me". This instance occurred in 1504. The first mention of Egyptians in English publication was in 1529. A keen analysis of Thomas Moore's Dialogue Concerning Heresies, published in 1529, alludes to the presence of a fortune-teller lodging in Lambeth, "an Egyptian", who was never known by name. This wise-woman used palmistry in her fortune telling.

The practice of palmistry would be incorporated into an act in 1531 enacted by Henry VIII's parliament as an attempt to deal with this problematic people who they described as "outlandish people calling themselves Egyptians". This was the Egyptians Act 1530 (22 Hen. 8. c 10).

=== Identity of the Egyptians ===
There is nearly a 70-year period from 1531 to 1598 in which Egyptians saw four different statutes that directly addressed them. Each statute, from Henry VIII's statute in 1531 to Elizabeth's statute in 1598, saw different methods of identification and punishment for the group.

During the early modern period across continental Europe and the Ottoman Empire, 'Egyptians' were self-described 'wanderers', wandering the earth as a redress for sins committed back in their homeland of Egypt.

The noun 'Egyptians', as used in the statutes concerning the people, serves merely as a self-descriptor as opposed to a demonym reflecting geographical origins. The term is not an endonym as the people who self-described themselves as 'Egyptians' were not always of Egyptian origin. Neither was it an exonym for this same reason. For those who self-presented themselves as 'Egyptian', the term was merely for purposes of self-presentation.

This is important to note as the term 'Egyptian', as used in the statutes, is not referring a to any one particular group of people, but a view and construction of a particular group shaped by legislators and governors. Through the use of vague definitions surrounding itinerancy and non-nativity that could be applied with great discretion, the early modern state of England attempted to exert control over this constructed group. This is made evident through an analytical look at the language utilized in the statutes throughout the 70-year period.

=== The four statutes concerning Egyptians ===
1. Egyptians Act 1530 An act concnyng Egypsyans. (22 Hen. 8 c. 11) 'Outlandysshe People Callynge Themselfes Egyptians.'
2. Egyptians Act 1554 An acte for the punishement of certayne Persons calling themselves Egiptians (1 & 2 Ph. & M. c. 4)
3. Egyptians Act 1562 An Acte for the Punishement of Vagabonds calling themselfes Egiptians. (5 Eliz. 1. c. 20)
4. Vagabonds Act 1597 An Acte for punishment of Rogues Vagabondes and Sturdy Beggars. (39 Eliz. 1. c. 4)

"Among those who were formally identified as the undeserving poor in these laws were rogues, beggars, vagabonds and a new category, 'counterfeit Egyptian', which included people who were thought to be pretending to be Gypsies."

Other recent developments regarding who the term "Egyptian" encompasses, as used in the statutes, alludes to the latter group, Gypsies, migrating to a more nomadic lifestyle as a result of economic developments in 16th-century England.

== Previous acts ==
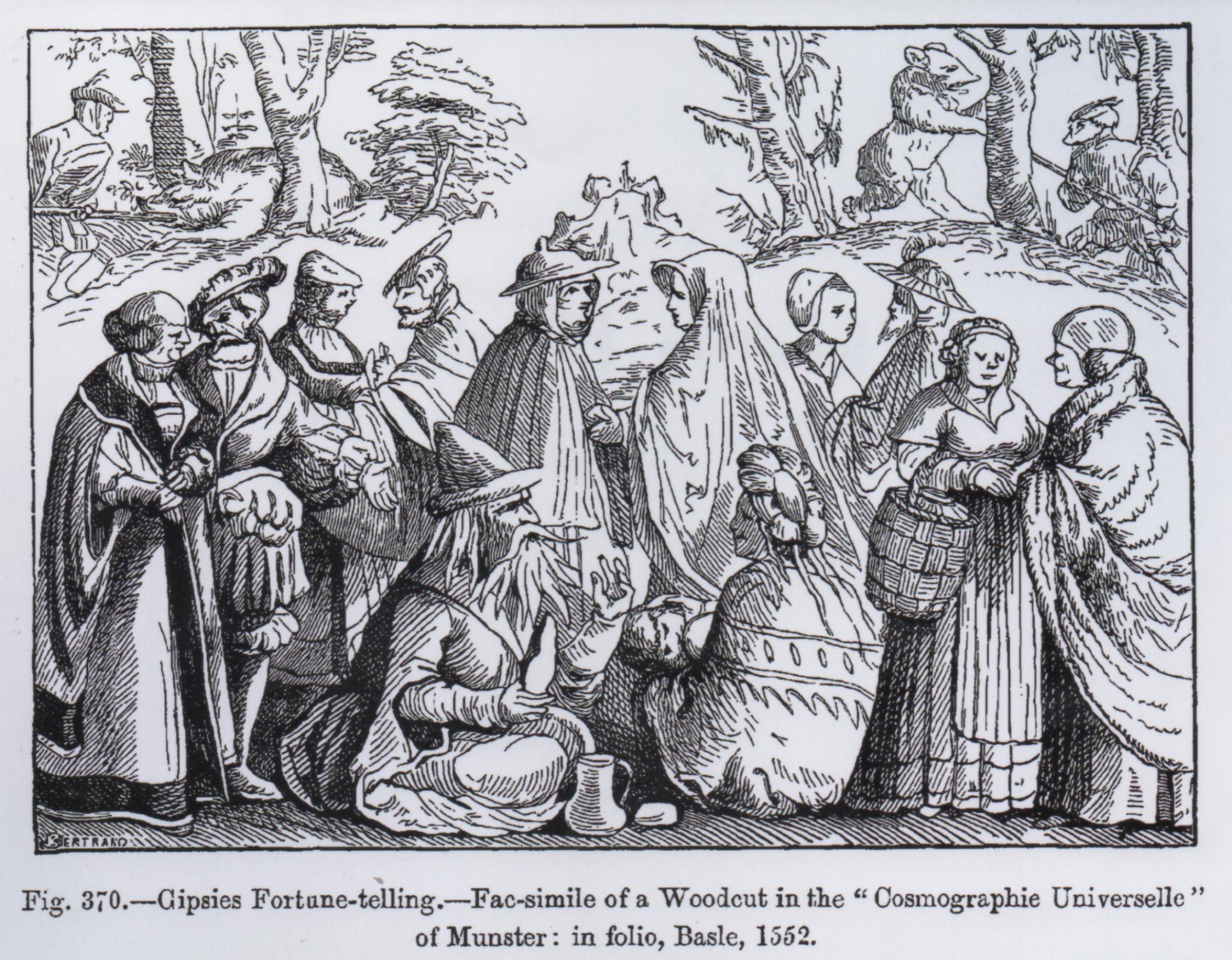
Gypsies Fortune Telling, woodcut in the Cosmographie Universalle of Munster, 1552, Basle (Courtesy of Robert Dawson Romany Collection)

England was no stranger to passing acts targeting specific groups of people, like the Egyptians Act 1530 (22 Hen. 8. c 10). The passing of these targeted acts started long before Egyptians (people who were called Egyptians) became a problem to them and sought out to eliminate people based on different qualifications and pressing issues in the passing years.

This first recorded act passed against a group of people was in 1349 called the Ordinance of Labourers (23 Edw. 3). This act was passed after the Black Plague and jobs were low so King Edward III passed this act to regulate the labor shortage, filtering out the people that didn't meet the specific qualifications noted in the act itself.

After the Egyptians Act 1530 was passed, the effect that it was supposed to have did not meet the expectations the people of England thought it would over the course of a few years. Because of that, Mary I passed the Egyptians Act 1554 with hopes that it would take a larger effect on the Egyptians still lingering in England.

The Egyptians Act 1530 and the Egyptians Act 1554 were the last acts passed targeting "Egyptians" in the name itself, but in the following years, issues of vagrancy were still on the rise. Due to the name of Egyptians and what the people of England thought of them, they were considered wanderers and vagrant and therefore still a pressing issue to England. For a 70 year period from 1530 to 1598, there were four statutes that addressed issues regarding vagrancy and people who called themselves "Egyptians".

The Egyptians Act 1554 came shortly after the Vagabonds Act 1547 (1 Edw. 6. c. 3) and is still related to "Egyptians" or Gypsies. This act was passed in Edward VI's first year, targeting people in England who refused to work. The Egyptians or Gypsies were often known for being called travellers and were considered vagrant. They would travel all around England but never would settle, and the Vagrancy Act was designed to limit the traveling of all vagabonds, including the Gypsies; and if they refused to settle down, the act imposed slavery for two years as a punishment. Whatever effect the act had upon the "Egyptians" remains relatively unknown, as it was repealed just two years later in 1550.

== Subsequent developments ==
The whole act was repealed by section 1 of the Repeal of Obsolete Statutes Act 1856 (19 & 20 Vict. c. 64), which came into force on 21 July 1856.
