= Gunther Barth =

American historian (1925–2004)

Gunther Paul Barth
- Born: January 10, 1925; Düsseldorf, Germany
- Died: January 7, 2004; Berkeley, California, U.S.
- Occupation: Historian of the American West
- Employer: University of California, Berkeley

Academic background
- Education: University of Cologne; University of Oregon; Harvard University
- Doctoral advisors: John King Fairbank; Oscar Handlin

Gunther Paul Barth (January 10, 1925 in Düsseldorf – January 7, 2004 in Berkeley) was an American historian. Barth joined the University of California, Berkeley faculty in 1962, became a professor of history in 1971, and taught Western American and urban history until his retirement in 1995.

== Early life ==
Gunther Barth was born in 1925 in Düsseldorf, Germany. He attended local schools in Düsseldorf until he was 16 years of age, after which World War II was well underway, and he entered the German army. He fought on several fronts, was wounded twice, and captured by British forces.

After the war, and out of the army, he worked as a journalist in Düsseldorf until 1951. During two of those years he studied literature and art history at the University of Cologne; he also won a year-long fellowship, awarded by the U.S. State Department, which enabled him to study at the University of Oregon. After another year in Cologne, he immigrated with his parents to the United States in 1951. He worked in New York City in construction and, for a short time, as a nightclub bouncer. By 1957, armed with an A.B. in European history and an M.A. in American history from the University of Oregon, he felt ready for doctoral work in history and entered Harvard University. In 1960 he became a naturalized U.S. citizen. Studying for five years, Barth was awarded a Ph.D. at Harvard in 1962.

== Career ==
Barth published in 1959 his Oregon master's thesis, “All Quiet on the Yamhill: The Civil War in Oregon,” and in 1964 his Harvard doctoral thesis, “Bitter Strength: A History of the Chinese in the United States, 1850-1870,” which appealed both to academics as well as to mainstream readers. Barth's other books included: “The Age of Industrialization in America” in 1968; “Instant Cities” in 1975; and “City People” in 1980. A Los Angeles Times reviewer called the 1980 book “a valuable example of street-level history,” and a New York Times reviewer pronounced it “rather like an old Cecil B. De Mille spectacular, only much better.”

Twice he was a Fulbright professor at the University of Cologne and once at the University of Hamburg in Germany.

== Selected works ==
- All Quiet on the Yamhill: The Civil War in Oregon, 1959
- Bitter Strength: A History of the Chinese in the United States, 1964
- The Age of Industrialization in America, 1968
- Instant Cities: Urbanization and the Rise of San Francisco and Denver, 1975
- City People: The Rise of Modern City Culture in Nineteenth-Century America, 1980
- Fleeting Moments: Nature and Culture in American History, 1990

== Personal life ==
Barth spoke German, English, French, Italian and Czech. He played soccer as a kid, learned football and played softball, squash and tennis.

Barth was married to Ellen Wood Barth. They had two sons, Dominic and Gilbert, and two daughters, Giselle and Christina who died in 2003.

Barth died on January 7, 2004, in Berkeley, California.

In memory of Gunter Barth, The Bancroft Library offers "The Gunther Barth Fellowship" annually: to support undergraduate or graduate students researching the 19th-century history of the North American West.
