= Lilian Handlin =

American historian

- Born: Lilian Bombach
- Spouse: Oscar Handlin (m. 1977; died 2011)

Academic background
- Education: Queens College, City University of New York; Brown University; Hebrew University of Jerusalem
- Doctoral advisor: Yehoshua Arieli

Academic work
- Discipline: History
- Sub-discipline: U.S. history
- Institutions: Hebrew University of Jerusalem

Lilian Handlin, née Bombach, is an American historian. She studied at Queens College in New York City and Hebrew University of Jerusalem. She is formerly a professor of history at Hebrew University.

== Life ==
Lilian Bombach was born to Edith Schneeweiss and Leon Bombach. She completed a B.A. from Queens College, City University of New York. Bombach earned a M.A. from Brown University. She completed a Ph.D. from the Hebrew University of Jerusalem. Her 1975 dissertation, about American historian and diplomat George Bancroft, was titled George Bancroft, Jacksonian reformer. Yehoshua Arieli was Bombach's doctoral advisor.

From 1970 to 1977, Handlin was an associate professor at the Hebrew University of Jerusalem. She married historian Oscar Handlin in 1977. In 1984, Handlin published a biography of George Bancroft. Handlin and her husband co-published a biography of President Abraham Lincoln (1980) and surveys of American history including the four-volume Liberty in America: 1600 to the Present.

She was married to Oscar Handlin from 1977 until his death in 2011.

== Selected bibliography ==
=== Authored ===
- George Bancroft: The Intellectual as Democrat (Harper and Row, 1984)

=== Co-authored with Oscar Handlin ===
- Abraham Lincoln and the Union (Plunkett Lake Press, 1980)
- A Restless People: Americans in Rebellion, 1770–1787 (Anchor Press, 1982)
- Liberty and Power: 1600–1760: Volume One of Liberty in America: 1600 to the Present (Harper & Row, 1986)
- Liberty in Expansion, 1760–1850: Volume Two of Liberty in America: 1600 to the Present (William A. Thomas Braille Bookstore, 1993)
- From the Outer World (1997)
