= Oscar Handlin =

American historian (1915–2011)

- Born: September 29, 1915; New York City, US
- Died: September 20, 2011 (aged 95); Cambridge, Massachusetts, US
- Spouses: Mary Flug (m. 1937; died 1976); Lilian Bombach (m. 1977)
- Children: 3, including David P. Handlin
- Awards: Pulitzer Prize (1952)

Academic background
- Education: Brooklyn College (BA); Harvard University (MA, PhD)
- Academic advisor: Arthur M. Schlesinger Sr.

Academic work
- Discipline: History
- Sub-discipline: American history; ethnic history; social history
- Institutions: Harvard University
- Doctoral students: Bernard Bailyn; Gunther Barth; Rowland Berthoff; Richard Bushman; Martin Duberman; Robert M. Fogelson; Roger Lane; Richard Sennett; Anne Firor Scott; Barbara Miller Solomon; Stephan Thernstrom
- Notable students: Morton Keller; David Rothman
- Main interests: History of immigration to the United States
- Notable works: The Uprooted (1951)

Oscar Handlin (September 29, 1915 – September 20, 2011) was an American historian. As a professor of history at Harvard University for over 50 years, he directed 80 PhD dissertations and helped promote social and ethnic history, virtually inventing the field of immigration history in the 1950s. Handlin won the 1952 Pulitzer Prize for History for The Uprooted (1951). Handlin's 1965 testimony before Congress played an important role in passage of the Immigration and Nationality Act of 1965 that abolished the discriminatory immigration quota system. According to historian James Grossman, "He reoriented the whole picture of the American story from the view that America was built on the spirit of the Wild West, to the idea that we are a nation of immigrants."

== Biography ==
Handlin was born in Brooklyn, New York City, on September 29, 1915, the eldest of three children of Russian-Jewish immigrants. His mother, the former Ida Yanowitz, came to the United States in 1904 and worked in the garment industry. His father, Joseph, immigrated in 1913 after attending a commercial college in Ukraine and being stationed in Harbin, China, as a soldier during the Russo-Japanese War. Handlin's parents were passionately devoted to literature and the life of the mind. Their experience of religious persecution in Czarist Russia made them fiercely devoted to democracy and social justice (Handlin was a proto-"red diaper baby"). The couple owned a grocery store, the success of which along with real estate investments enabled them to send their children, Oscar, Nathan, and Sarah, to Harvard.

Known for his prodigious memory that allowed him to attend classes without taking notes, in 1930, Handlin entered Brooklyn College at age 15, graduating in 1934, then earning a Master of Arts degree from Harvard University in 1935, after which he won a Frederick Sheldon Fellowship for research in Europe. "'I don't know why,' Dr. Handlin joked in a 1952 [Boston] Globe interview. 'I guess they just liked my face.' Traveling in England, Ireland, Italy, and France, he began assembling material that would become his first book 'Boston's Immigrants, 1790–1865' [1941]."

Between 1936 and 1938, Handlin taught history at Brooklyn College before reentering Harvard University.

According to Handlin, it was Arthur M. Schlesinger Sr. who "directed my attention to the subjects of social history that have since occupied much of my attention," urging Handlin to write his dissertation on immigration to Boston in the late 18th and early 19th centuries. In 1940 he received his PhD, joining the faculty in 1939 and remaining until 1986, his work centering around the topic of immigrants in the US and their influence on culture.

During his time as a graduate student at Harvard, Handlin was denied the position of vice president in the Henry Adams Club for being Jewish. He was among the first Jewish scholars appointed to a full professorship at Harvard. He also taught at the Harvard Extension School. He was a staunch anti-Communist and Vietnam War hawk in the 1960s.

Handlin was elected to the American Philosophical Society in 1999.

He died at age 95 on September 20, 2011, in Cambridge, Massachusetts.

== Administrator ==
Handlin was very active as a scholarly organizer and administrator. In the Harvard history department he helped create the Center for the Study of the History of Liberty in America, and directed it from 1958 to 1967; he also chaired the Charles Warren Center for Studies in American History from 1965 to 1973. From 1962 to 1966 he was a top official of the United States Board of Foreign Scholarships, which awards Fulbright scholarships. He served on the board of overseers of Brandeis University, and was a trustee of the New York Public Library. He was Harvard's chief librarian from 1979 to 1984 and acting director of the Harvard University Press in 1972.

In 1972–73 Handlin was the Harold Vyvyan Harmsworth Professor of American History at Oxford University.

== Positions ==
=== Immigration ===
Among Handlin's many important contributions was his pioneering work on immigration to America. In his Pulitzer Prize–winning book The Uprooted (1951), he opens with the famous declaration: "Once I thought to write a history of the immigrants in America. Then I discovered that the immigrants were American history." In the process, Handlin laid the ground for study of immigration by the succeeding generation of historians, even though many of them would dispute his immigrant archetype of a peasant guided primarily by religious conviction, having no familiarity with wage work or urban settings, and having experienced migration first and foremost as alienation from family, community, and tradition.

Handlin was one of the most prolific and influential American historians of the 20th century. As an American historian and educator he was noted for his in depth examination of American immigration history, ethnic history, and social history. His dissertation (1941) was published as his first book Boston's Immigrants, 1790–1865: A Study in Acculturation (1941). The book was highly regarded for its innovative research on sociological concepts and census data. In 1941 it won the prestigious John H. Dunning Prize from the American Historical Association as outstanding historical work published by a young scholar. The American Journal of Sociology described it as "the first historical case study of the impact of immigrants upon a particular society and the adjustment of the immigrants to that society. The writer has opened a new field for historical research and has also made a significant contribution to the literature of race and culture contacts."

In 1947, he and his first wife Mary Flug Handlin published Commonwealth: A Study of the Role of Government in the American Economy: Massachusetts, 1774-1861, which revealed for the first time the importance of political action in the development of the US free enterprise system.

By the late 1950s, Oscar Handlin was publishing a book nearly every year, covering the fields of civil rights, liberty, ethnicity, urban history, the history of education, foreign affairs, migration, biography, adolescence, even a book of poetry. Sometimes he wrote collaboratively with his first wife Mary Flug Handlin and, after her 1976 death, with his second wife Lilian Bombach, whom he married in 1977.

In the 1960s, Handlin published 11 books, wrote a monthly column for The Atlantic Monthly, directed the Center for the Study of Liberty in America, helped manage a commercial television station in Boston, chaired a board that oversaw Fulbright Scholarship awards, all in addition to his teaching duties at Harvard. From 1979 to 1983 he was director of the Harvard University Library. He also edited a 42-volume collection of books on subjects relating to immigration and ethnicity, The American Immigration Collection (1969). During the next three decades, Handlin published 12 more books, many on the subject of liberty, and edited at least 20 biographies. He continued his work with immigrants with From the Outer World (1997), which collected the travel accounts of visitors to the United States from non-European countries.

=== American slavery ===
Oscar Handlin argued that racism was a by-product of slavery, and that the main focus was on the fact that slaves, like indentured servants, were regarded as inferior because of their status, not necessarily because of their race.

=== Civil Rights Movement ===
In 1964, Handlin published Fire Bell in the Night: The Crisis in Civil Rights, which criticized white supremacists and suburban liberals, but also criticized leftists for their Communist-inspired solutions such as quotas, school busing, and affirmative action, writing: "Preferential treatment demands a departure from the ideal which judges individuals by their own merits rather than by their affiliations."

=== Left and Right ===
In March 1961, Handlin signed an ACLU-organized petition of scholars demanding that the House Committee on Un-American Activities (HUAC) cease operations.

In 1961, Handlin published The Distortion of America, his critique of the attractions of Communism. The 1996 second edition covers Yugoslavia, China, and Arthur Koestler. "The study of the human past persuades me that, despite the frequent risks of failure, man has the capacity to make order and find purpose in the world in which he lives when he uses the power of his reason to do so."

His long-time colleague Bernard Bailyn noted Handlin's commitment to providing a historical perspective on policy issues:

He published widely on all the major public issues of the time: racism, group life, anti-Semitism, prejudice, the Bill of Rights, the business corporation, ethnicity, and the Jews and other groups in American society. He was liberal in social controversies, especially those related to immigration, race, social justice, and equal opportunity. In the Vietnam era, however, shocked by what he took to be the naive views of the left-leaning professoriate, he turned to the right and became deeply conservative in his politics.

In 1979, Handlin published Truth in History, which criticized New Left historians and the corruption of American universities with faddishness, hiring quotas, overspecialization and fragmentation in history studies, and deficiencies in graduate training.

=== The Vietnam War ===
In December 1967, Handlin was one of 14 anti-Communist American scholars who co-wrote a report for the Freedom House Public Affairs Institute, which argued that disaster would strike if the US withdrew from Vietnam. In 1988, Handlin, John Silber, et al. founded the conservative National Association of Scholars.

== Bibliography ==
- Boston's Immigrants, 1790–1865 (1941; rev. ed. 1959)
- Commonwealth: A Study of the Role of Government in the American Economy: Massachusetts, 1774-1861 (1947, together with his first wife Mary Flug Handlin; rev. ed. 1987)
- The Uprooted: The Epic Story of the Great Migrations That Made the American People (1951, 2nd enlarged ed. 1973)
- Adventure in Freedom; 300 Years of Jewish Life in America (1954)
- Chance or Destiny: Turning Points in American History (1955), Little, Brown, & Co.
- Race and Nationality in American Life (1957)
- Readings in American History (1957)
- Al Smith and His America (Jan. 1, 1958)
- The Newcomers: Negroes and Puerto Ricans in a Changing Metropolis (1959)
- The Distortion of America (1961, 2nd ed. 1996)
- The Dimensions of Liberty (1961, with Mary Flug Handlin)
- The Americans: A New History of the People of the United States (1963)
- A Continuing Task: The American Jewish Joint Distribution Committee, 1914–1964 (1964)
- Fire Bell in the Night: The Crisis in Civil Rights (1964)
- Children of the Uprooted (1966)
- The Popular Sources of Political Authority: Documents on the Massachusetts Constitution of 1780 (1966)
- The American Immigration Collection (42 vols.) (1969)
- The American College and American Culture (1970)
- Statue of Liberty (1971)
- A Pictorial History of Immigration (1972)
- Occasions for Love, and Other Essays at Recollection (Poetry, 1977)
- Truth In History (1979)
- Harvard Encyclopedia of American Ethnic Groups (1981, with Stephan Thernstrom and Anne Orlov)
- Liberty in America: From 1600 to the Present (4 vols.) (1986-1994, with Lilian Handlin); includes Liberty and Power, 1600–1760 (1986), Liberty in Expansion, 1760–1850 (Aug. 1989), Liberty in Peril, 1850–1920 (1992), Liberty and Equality, 1920–1994 (1994)
- "A Career at Harvard" in The American Scholar, Vol. 65 (Winter 1996).
- From the Outer World (1997, with Lilian Handlin)

== About Handlin ==
- Anbinder, Tyler. "Boston's Immigrants and the Making of American Immigration History," Journal of American Ethnic History (2013) 32#3 pp 19–25.
- Bailyn, Bernard. "Oscar Handlin," Proceedings of the American Philosophical Society (2013) 157#2 pp: 243–247
- Bukowczyk, John J. "Oscar Handlin's America," Journal of American Ethnic History (Spring 2013) 32#3 pp 7–18; special issue devoted to Handlin.
- Bushman, Richard L. et al., eds. Uprooted Americans: Essays to Honor Oscar Handlin (1979)
- Diner, Hasia. "Oscar Handlin: A Jewish Historian," Journal of American Ethnic History (2013) 32#3 pp 53–61
- Gerber, David A. "The Uprooted Would Never Have Been Written If Oscar Handlin Had Taken His Own, Latter-Day Advice," Journal of American Ethnic History (2013) 32#3 pp 68–77
- Kraut, Alan M. "Oscar Handlin and the Idea That We Are a Nation of Immigrants," Journal of American Ethnic History (2013) 32#3 pp 26–36
- Ngai, Mae M. "Oscar Handlin and Immigration Policy Reform in the 1950s and 1960s," Journal of American Ethnic History (2013) 32#3 pp 62–67
- Reed, Touré F. "Oscar Handlin and the Problem of Ethnic Pluralism and African American Civil Rights," Journal of American Ethnic History (2013) 32#3 pp 37–45
- Rothman, David J. "The Uprooted: Thirty Years Later," Reviews in American History 10 (September 1982): 311–19 in JSTOR
- Stave, Bruce, "A Conversation with Oscar Handlin," in The Making of Urban History (1977)
- Thomas, Lorrin. "Oscar Handlin, The Newcomers: Negroes and Puerto Ricans in a Changing Metropolis," Journal of American Ethnic History (2013) 32#3 pp 46–52
- Ueda, Reed. "Immigration and the moral criticism of American history: The vision of Oscar Handlin," Canadian Review of American Studies, 1990, Vol. 21 Issue 2, pp 183–202
- Vecoli, Rudolph J. "Contadini in Chicago: A Critique of The Uprooted," Journal of American History 5 (December 1964): 404–17, critique of Handlin in JSTOR
- Whitfield, Stephen J, "Handlin's History," American Jewish History, Vol. 70, (December 1980)

Academic offices
| Preceded by William Leuchtenburg | Harold Vyvyan Harmsworth; Professor of American History; 1972 | Succeeded by Carl Neumann Degler |
Awards
| Preceded by R. Carlyle Buley | Pulitzer Prize for History; 1952 | Succeeded by George Dangerfield |
