= David P. Handlin =

American architect

David P. Handlin is an American architect and architectural historian.

== Life and career ==
Handlin was born in Boston, the son of the historians Oscar Handlin and Mary Flug Handlin. He studied at Harvard University and the Harvard Graduate School of Design and earned a doctorate from Cambridge University.

He was a lecturer in architecture at Cambridge from 1973 to 1978 and an associate professor in architecture at the Harvard Graduate School of design from 1973 to 1978. He later founded the architecture firm of Handlin, Garrahan, Zachos and Associates in Cambridge, Massachusetts, of which he is president.

Handlin has written two survey books, The American Home, Architecture and Society, 1815–1915 and American Architecture. He has been characterized as a conservative architectural historian.

== Publications ==
- The American Home, Architecture and Society, 1815–1915. Boston: Little, Brown, 1979. ISBN 9780316343008.
- American Architecture. World of Art. London: Thames and Hudson, 1985. ISBN 9780500202005. Rev. ed. 2004. ISBN 9780500203736.
