= Yehoshua Arieli =

Israeli historian and professor

- יהושע אריאלי
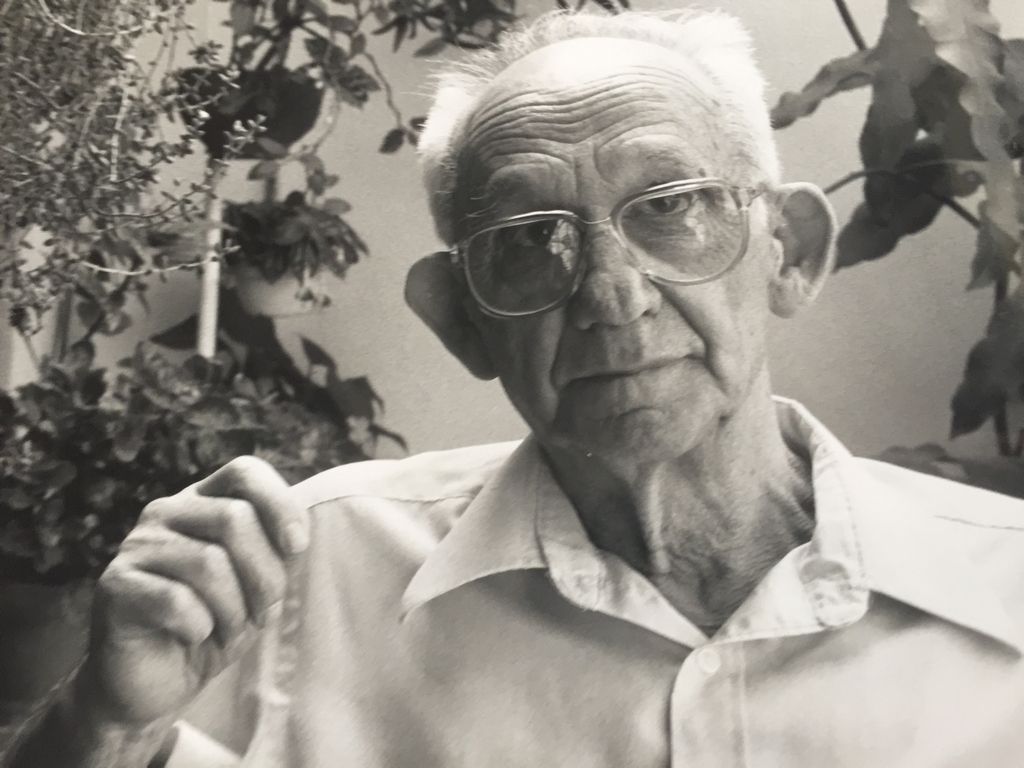
- Yehoshua Arieli
- Born: July 26, 1916; Carlsbad, Czechoslovakia
- Died: August 3, 2002 (aged 86)
- Education: Hebrew University of Jerusalem, Harvard University
- Occupation: Historian
- Known for: Individualism and Nationalism in American Ideology
- Awards: Israel Prize (1993)

Yehoshua Arieli (Hebrew: יהושע אריאלי; 26 July 1916 – 3 August 2002) was an Israeli historian and Emeritus Professor of American History at the Hebrew University of Jerusalem. He was born in Karlovy Vary (Carlsbad), Czechoslovakia, and was taken to Ereẓ Israel in 1931. Arieli was perhaps best known for writing Individualism and Nationalism in American Ideology. Between 1976 and 1991 Arieli served as chairman and member of the board of directors of the Historical Society of Israel. In 1993, Arieli was awarded the Israel Prize for his contributions to history.

== Education ==
Between 1937 and 1940, he studied history at the Hebrew University. He attended Harvard University as a Fulbright scholar and received his PhD in 1955 from the Hebrew University.

== Works ==
As a respected person in the field of American History and American studies, he founded and established the field of American History and studies at the Hebrew University of Jerusalem and also aided in the launch of the field at the universities of Tel Aviv and Haifa.

== Bibliography ==
- Individualism and Nationalism in American Ideology (Cambridge, Massachusetts: Harvard University Press, 1964)
- Political Thought in the United States, 2 vols. (Cambridge: HUP, 1967–68)
- Totalitarian Democracy and After: Totalitarianism Movements and Political Religions, 2 vol. (Taylor & Francis, 1984)
