= Carl Frederick Wittke =

American historian

Carl Frederick Wittke, (13 November 1892 – 24 May 1971) was an American historian and academic administrator. He was a specialist on ethnic history in America, especially regarding the German Americans. He was born in Columbus, Ohio in 1892; his father was a German immigrant who owned a factory. In 1913 he graduated Phi Beta Kappa from Ohio State University, and gained a PhD in history under Professor Charles Howard McIlwain at Harvard in 1921. He taught history at Ohio State University (1921–37), and for a few years was chair of the history department and later, dean of the graduate school. He was the dean at Oberlin College (1937–1948). He then became dean of the graduate school at Western Reserve University, until his retirement in 1963.

Wittke wrote 13 scholarly books, edited a comprehensive six volume history of Ohio, wrote hundreds of articles for scholarly journals and popular magazines, and wrote 262 critical book reviews. Wittke served on the editorial boards of the Mississippi Valley Historical Review, Canadian Historical Review, and the Ohio Historical Society Quarterly. He helped establish ethnic studies as a major specialty in American history.

== Bibliography ==
- German-Americans and the World War. Ohio State Archaeological and Historical Society, 1936 (with special emphasis on Ohio's German-language press)
- A History of Canada. McClelland & Stewart, 1941. online
- editor, The History of the State of Ohio. Ohio State Archaeological and Historical Society, 6 vol 1941.
- Against the Current: The Life of Karl Heinzen (1809–80) University of Chicago Press, 1945. online
- We Who Built America: The Saga of the Immigrant. Prentice-Hall, 1939. online
- The Utopian Communist: A Biography of Wilhelm Weitling, Nineteenth-Century Reformer. Louisiana State University Press, 1950. online
- Refugees of Revolution. University of Pennsylvania Press 1952 online; also online
- "The immigrant theme on the American stage." Mississippi Valley Historical Review 39.2 (1952): 211–232 online
- The Irish in America. Louisiana State University Press, 1956. online
- The German-Language Press in America. U. of Kentucky Press, 1957.
- "Ohio's Germans, 1840–1875." Ohio Historical Quarterly 66 (1957): 339–54.
- William Nast: Patriarch of German Methodism. Wayne State University Press, 1959.
- The Foundations of Ohio. Ohio State Archaeological and Historical Society, 1968, coauthor with Beverley Waugh Bond,
- Tambo and Bones: A History of the American Minstrel Stage. Greenwood Pub Group, 1968. online

== See also ==
- German Americans
