= Egyptians Act 1530 =

Act of the Parliament of England

- Act of Parliament
- Parliament of England
- Long title: An Act concerning Egyptians.
- Citation: 22 Hen. 8. c 10
- Territorial extent: England and Wales

Dates
- Royal assent: 31 March 1531
- Commencement: 16 January 1531 (Note: Start of session.)
- Repealed: 21 July 1856
Other legislation
Repealed by	Repeal of Obsolete Statutes Act 1856
Relates to	Egyptians Act 1554

Status: Repealed

Text of statute as originally enacted

The Egyptians Act 1530 (22 Hen. 8. c. 10) was an act of the Parliament of England in 1531 to expel the "outlandish people calling themselves Egyptians", meaning Roma. It was repealed by the Repeal of Obsolete Statutes Act 1856 (19 & 20 Vict. c. 64).

== Provisions ==
The act accused Romanichals of using "crafty and subtle devices" to deceive people, notably by claiming to tell fortunes whilst also allegedly frequently committing felonies such as robbery. The statute forbade any more Roma from entering the realm and gave those already in England sixteen days' notice to depart from the realm. Goods which Roma had stolen were to be restored to their owners. Roma who violated the statute were to have their properties confiscated and divided between the Sovereign and the Justice of the Peace or another arresting officer.

an outlandish people, calling themselves Egyptians, using no craft nor feat of merchandise, who have come into this realm, and gone from shire to shire, and place to place, in great company; and used great subtlety and crafty means to deceive the people--bearing them in hand that they, by palmistry, could tell men's and women's fortunes; and so, many times, by craft and subtlety, have deceived the people for their money; and also have committed many heinous felonies and robberies, to the great hurt and deceit of the people that they have come among.... ... the Egyptians now being in this realm, have monition to depart within sixteen days.... from henceforth no such person be suffered to come within this the King's realm and if they do, then they and every of them so doing, shall forfeit to the King our Sovereign Lord all their goods and titles and then to be commanded to avoid the realm within fifteen days under pain of imprisonment....

== Subsequent developments ==
The act was not successful in its aim of expelling all Roma, for Mary I passed the Egyptians Act 1554 (1 & 2 Ph. & M. c. 4)), which complained that "Egyptians" were plying their "devilish and naughty practices and devices". However, the newer act allowed some Roma to escape prosecution so long as they abandoned their nomadic lifestyle, or as the act put it, their "naughty, idle and ungodly life and company".

The whole act was repealed by section 1 of the Repeal of Obsolete Statutes Act 1856 (19 & 20 Vict. c. 64), which came into force on 21 July 1856.

== See also ==
- UK immigration law
- UK labour law
- Vagrancy Act 1824 s 4, contained the offence of telling fortunes
