= The Uprooted =

Book by Oscar Handlin

- Author: Oscar Handlin
- Language: English
- Subject: Immigration
- Genre: Non-fiction
- Publisher: Little, Brown and Company, Boston
- Publication date: 1952
- Publication place: United States
- Media type: Book
- Pages: 352

The Uprooted: The Epic Story of the Great Migrations That Made the American People is book about European migrations into the United States by Oscar Handlin. It won the Pulitzer Prize for History in 1952.
