= Mary Flug Handlin =

U.S. historian (1913–1976)

- Born: Mary Flug; September 14, 1913; New York City, U.S.
- Died: May 24, 1976 (aged 62); Cambridge, Massachusetts, U.S.
- Spouse: Oscar Handlin (m. 1937)
- Children: 3; including David P. Handlin

Academic background
- Education: Brooklyn College; Columbia University

Academic work
- Discipline: History
- Sub-discipline: U.S. history
- Institutions: Social Science Research Council; Harvard University

Mary Flug Handlin (September 14, 1913 – May 24, 1976) was an American historian who was the editor of the Harvard University Center for the Study of the History of Liberty in America from 1958 to 1976. She co-authored six books on U.S. politics and society with her husband, Oscar Handlin.

== Life ==
Handlin was born in New York City on September 14, 1913, to Fanny Schuck and Harry Flug. She earned an A.B. from Brooklyn College in 1933. She completed an A.M. from Columbia University faculty of political science in 1934. Her master's thesis was titled, Minnesota farmer-labor party.

From 1935 to 1942, Handlin worked as an analyst for government agencies including as an investigator for the New York City Department of Welfare. She married historian Oscar Handlin in 1937. That same year, she completed coursework at the London School of Economics. From 1942 to 1946, Handlin was a research historian with the Social Science Research Council. Starting in 1947, she co-authored six books on U.S. politics and society with her husband. Handling was an assistant editor of the Harvard Guide to American History from 1950 to 1954. In 1958, Handlin became editor of the Center for the Study of the History of Liberty in America at Harvard University.

Handlin and her husband had two daughters, and a son, David P. Handlin. She died from cancer on May 24, 1976, at the Stillman Infirmary, Harvard University Health Services.
