= Historical immigration to Great Britain =

Modern humans inhabited Great Britain long before the arrival of the Romans in the first century BC, an era for which no written historical records exist. Following the Roman withdrawal, there was a substantial migration of Germanics, specifically, the Angles, the Saxons, and the Jutes, spanning from the 5th to the 7th centuries AD, leading to the formation of England by 12 July 927.

Beginning at the end of the eighth century, bands of Vikings began a series of maritime incursions, which subsequently led to permanent settlement across extensive areas of Britain. In 1066, the Normans successfully took control of England. Subsequently, the Plantagenet Dynasty held the Throne of England from 1154 to 1485. These events resulted in a continuous flow of migration from France during this period. Other European migrants included Flemings and French Huguenots.

The Great Famine in Ireland, then part of the United Kingdom, resulted in perhaps a million people migrating to Great Britain. Throughout the 19th century, a small population of 28,644 German immigrants built up in England and Wales. London held around half of this population, and other small communities existed in Manchester, Bradford and elsewhere. The German immigrant population was the largest group until 1891, when it became second to Russian Jews. After 1881, Russian Jews suffered bitter persecutions and as a result 2 million left the Russian Empire by 1914. Around 120,000 settled permanently in Britain, becoming the largest ethnic minority from outside the British Isles, and by 1938 this population had increased to 370,000. Unable to return to Poland at the end of the Second World War, over 120,000 Polish veterans remained in the UK permanently. After the Second World War, there was substantial immigration from colonies and former colonies to the United Kingdom this was authorised by the British Nationality Act 1948 granted residency rights to all colonial subjects, approximately 800 million, enabling mass post-war immigration. In 1841, only 0.25 per cent of the population of England and Wales was born in a foreign country, increasing to 1.5 per cent by 1901, 2.6 per cent by 1931 and 4.4 per cent in 1951. DNA studies have been used to provide a direct record of the effects of immigration on the population.

== Prehistory ==
The ancestors of the people who built Stonehenge were Neolithic farmers originating from Anatolia who brought agriculture to Europe. At the time of their arrival, around 4,000 BC, Britain was inhabited by groups of hunter-gatherers who were the first inhabitants of the island after the last Ice Age ended about 11,700 years ago. The farmers replaced most of the hunter-gatherer population in the British Isles without mixing much with them.

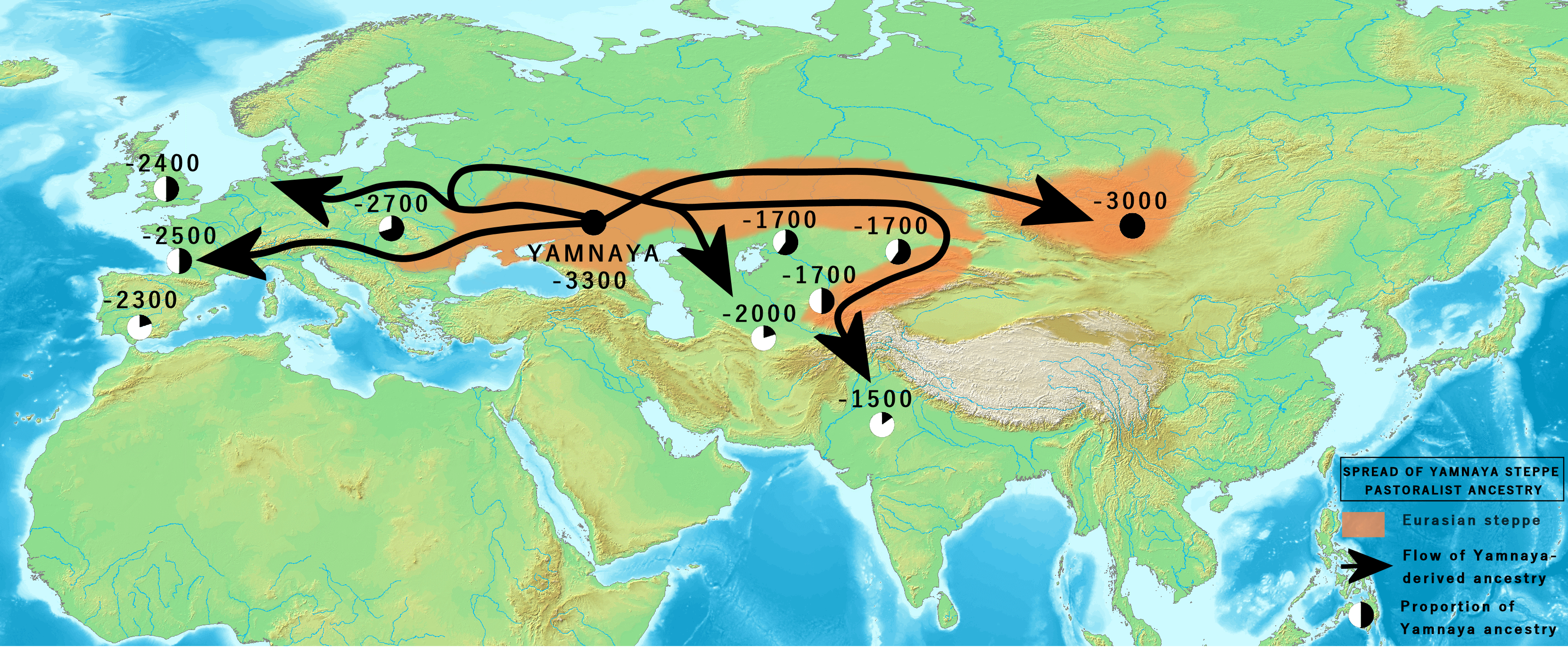
Bronze Age spread of Yamnaya Steppe pastoralist ancestry. The Yamnaya culture is identified with the late Proto-Indo-Europeans.

At the time the megalithic Stonehenge was constructed by Neolithic people, the Bell Beaker people arrived, around 2,500 BC, migrating from mainland Europe. They were most likely speakers of Indo-European languages whose ancestors migrated from the Pontic–Caspian steppe. Eventually, there was again a large population replacement in Britain. More than 90% of Britain's Neolithic gene pool was replaced with the arrival of the Bell Beaker people, who had approximately 50% WSH ancestry.

A major archaeogenetics study uncovered a migration into southern Britain in the Bronze Age, during the 500-year period 1,300–800 BC. The newcomers were genetically most similar to ancient individuals from Gaul and had higher levels of EEF ancestry. The authors describe this as a "plausible vector for the spread of early Celtic languages into Britain". During 1,000–875 BC, their genetic marker swiftly spread through southern Britain, making up around half the ancestry of subsequent Iron Age people in this area, but not in northern Britain.

The last centuries before the Roman invasion saw an influx of Celtic speaking refugees from Gaul known as the Belgae, who were displaced as the Romans expanded around 50 BC.

There is some disagreement about when speakers of Celtic languages first arrived in Ireland. It is thought by some scholars to be associated with the Bell Beaker people of the Bronze Age, however others argue that Celtic speakers arrived much later at the beginning of the Iron Age.

== Antiquity ==
=== Roman Empire ===
The first Roman invasion of Great Britain was led by Julius Caesar in 55 BC; the second, a year later, in 54 BC. The Romans had many supporters among the Celtic tribal leaders, who agreed to pay tribute to Rome in return for Roman protection. The Romans returned in AD 43, led by the Emperor Claudius, this time establishing control and establishing the province of Britannia. Initially an oppressive rule, gradually the new leaders gained a firmer hold on their new territory, which at one point stretched from the south coast of England to Wales and northwards as far as southern Scotland.

During the 367 years of Roman occupation of Britain, many settlers were soldiers garrisoned on the mainland. It was with constant contact with Rome and the rest of Romanised Europe through trade and industry that the elite native Britons themselves adopted Roman culture and customs, such as the Latin language, though the majority in the countryside were little affected.

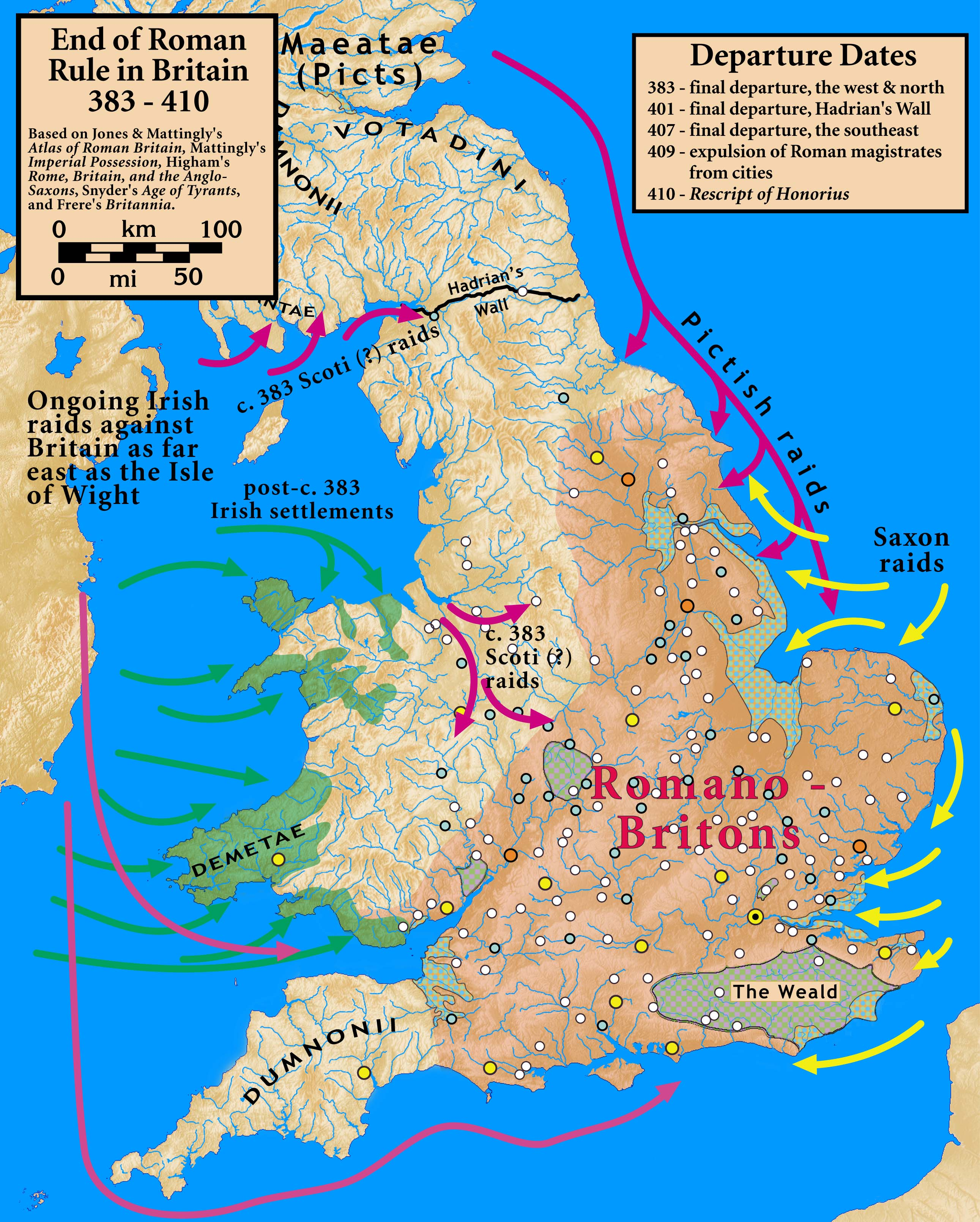
End of Roman rule in Britain, 383–410

The capital city of Londinium had inhabitants who were not natives of Great Britain; they clustered in administrative and military centres, as migration was closely tied to imperial governance rather than to the permanent settlement of entire diasporas. They were from across the Roman Empire, overwhelmingly from continental Europe, particularly from Gaul and the Rhineland in Germania. Archaeological findings suggest individuals from the Middle East and North Africa were also present, but these represent rare anomalies tied strictly to imperial governance rather than any permanent settlement. Of Roman Britain's estimated population of three million, the urban population was about 240,000 people, with Londinium having an estimated 60,000 people. However, after Britannia ceased to be a functional Roman province, many of the urban areas collapsed and the overall population may have declined by as much as two million.

=== Irish (medieval) ===
During the 5th century, Irish pirates known as the Scotti started raiding north-western Britain from their base in north-east Ireland. After the Roman withdrawal they established the kingdom of Dál Riata, roughly equivalent to Argyll. This migration is traditionally held to be the means by which Primitive Irish was introduced into what is now Scotland. Similar proposals have been made for areas of western Wales, where an Irish language presence is evident. Others have argued that the traditional narrative of significant migration, particularly in the case of Dál Riata, is likely correct.

=== Anglo-Saxons ===
The spread of Angles (orange), Saxons (blue) and Jutes (green) to the British Isles around 500 AD

Germanic (Frankish) mercenaries were employed in Gaul by the Roman Empire and it is speculated that in a similar manner, the first Germanic immigrants to Britain arrived at the invitation of the British ruling classes at the end of the Roman period. Though the (probably mythical) landing of Hengist and Horsa in Kent in 449 is traditionally considered to be the start of the Anglo-Saxon migrations, archaeological evidence has shown that significant settlement in East Anglia predated this by nearly half a century.

The key area of large-scale migration was southeastern Britain; in this region, place names of Celtic and Latin origin are extremely few. Genetic and isotope evidence has demonstrated that the settlers included both men and women, many of whom were of a low socioeconomic status, and that migration continued over an extended period, possibly more than two hundred years. The varied dialects spoken by the new arrivals eventually coalesced into Old English, the ancestor of the modern English language.

In the Post-Roman period the traditional division of the Anglo-Saxons into Angles, Saxons and Jutes is first seen in the Historia ecclesiastica gentis Anglorum by Bede; however, historical and archaeological research has shown that a wider range of Germanic peoples from Frisia, Lower Saxony, Jutland and possibly southern Sweden moved to Britain during this period. Scholars have stressed that the adoption of specifically Anglian, Saxon and Jutish identities was the result of a later period of ethnogenesis.

Following the settlement period, Anglo-Saxon elites and kingdoms began to emerge; these are traditionally grouped together as the Heptarchy. Their formation has been linked to a second stage of Anglo-Saxon expansion in which the kingdoms of Wessex, Mercia and Northumbria each began periods of conquest of British territory. It is likely that these kingdoms housed significant numbers of Britons, particularly on their western margins. That this was the case is demonstrated by the late seventh century laws of King Ine, which made specific provisions for Britons who lived in Wessex.

== Medieval ==
=== Vikings ===
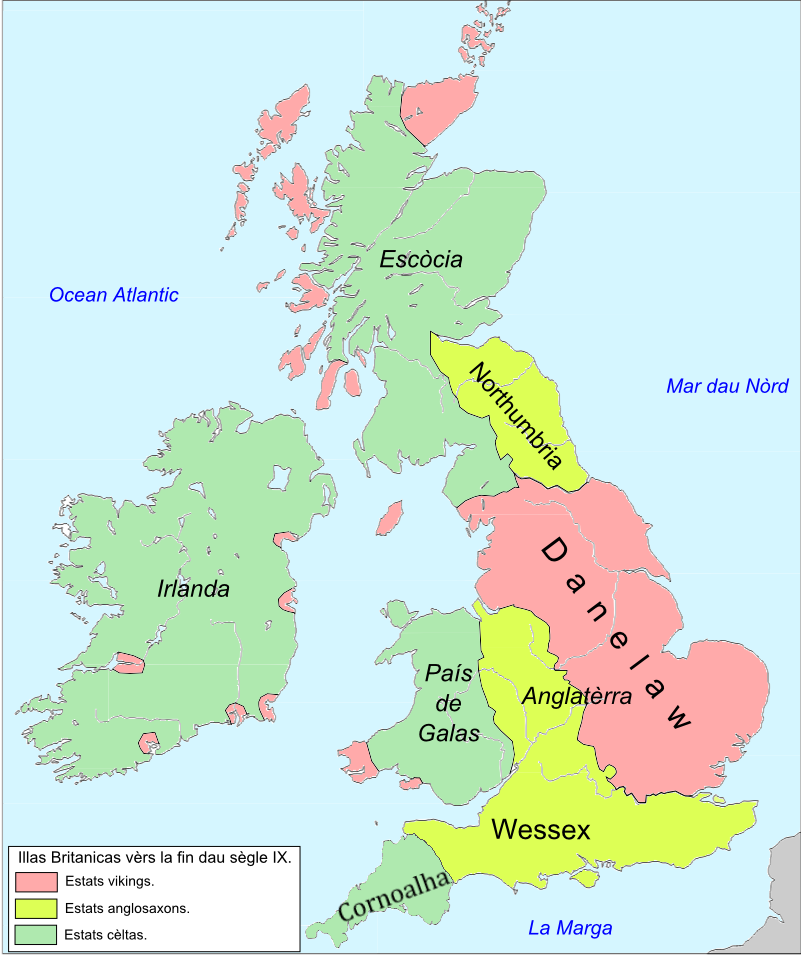
Territories controlled by the Vikings (red), Anglo-Saxons (yellow) and Celts (green) in the 9th century

The earliest date given for a Viking raid of Britain is 789, when, according to the Anglo-Saxon Chronicle, Portland was attacked. A more exact report dates from 8 June 793, when the cloister at Lindisfarne was pillaged by foreign seafarers. These raiders, whose expeditions extended well into the 9th century, were gradually followed by armies and settlers who brought a new culture and tradition markedly different from that of the prevalent Anglo-Saxon society of southern Britain. The Danelaw, established through the Viking conquest of large parts of the Anglo-Saxon cultural sphere, was formed as a result of the Treaty of Wedmore in the late 9th century, after Alfred the Great had defeated the Viking Guthrum at the Battle of Ethandun. Between 1016 and 1042, England was ruled by Danish kings. Following this, the Anglo-Saxons regained control until 1066.

Though located formally within the Danelaw, counties such as Hertfordshire, Bedfordshire, and Essex do not seem to have experienced much Danish settlement, which was more concentrated in Yorkshire, Lincolnshire, Nottinghamshire and Leicestershire, as demonstrated by toponymic evidence. The Scandinavians who settled along the coast of the Irish sea were mainly of Norwegian origin, though many had arrived via Ireland.

Most of the Vikings arriving in the northern parts of Britain also originated in Norway. Settlement was densest in the Shetland and Orkney islands and Caithness, where Norn, a language descended from Old Norse, was historically spoken, but a Viking presence has also been identified in the Hebrides and the western Scottish Highlands.

=== Normans ===
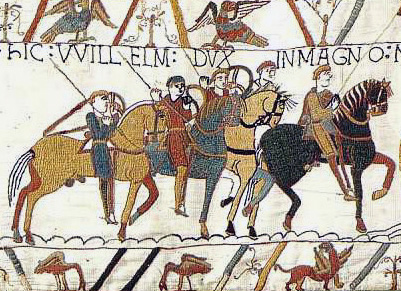
Normans, as portrayed here on the Bayeux Tapestry, were an elite who made up an estimated 2% of England's population.

The Norman Conquest of 1066 is normally considered the last successful attempt in history by a foreign army to take control of the Kingdom of England by means of military occupation. From the Norman point of view, William the Conqueror was the legitimate heir to the realm (as explained in the Bayeux Tapestry), and the invasion was required to secure this against the usurpation of Harold Godwinson. William ejected the Anglo-Saxon ruling class, installing his followers in their place. Most of these were from Normandy, but a significant portion were of Breton origin. Artisans and merchants from France also settled in England to take advantage of economic opportunities in the wake of the conquest.

In the years following the invasion to 1204, when Normandy was lost to France, the new nobility maintained close ties with their homelands across the channel. This was in part secured by granting aristocrats lands in both domains, giving an incentive on all levels to maintain the union. The influx of Norman military and ecclesiastical aristocracy changed the nature of the ruling class in England, leading to the creation of an Anglo-Norman population. Some French nobles moved north to Scotland at the invitation of King David I, where they established many of the royal houses that would dominate Scottish politics in the coming centuries. These included the Balliols, the Bruces and the FitzAlans.

Though the Normans formed a powerful elite, they were vastly outnumbered by their English and Scottish subjects. It has been estimated that they made up only 2 percent of the population of England.

=== The Jews ===
A small but significant Jewish population was present in England from the reign of William I until the end of the thirteenth century. There was no resident Jewish population in England at the time of William’s invasion, nor had there been one since the end of the Roman Empire. There was an important Jewish population at Rouen, capital of the Norman dukes, and it was Jews from this population who settled in England shortly after the Norman Conquest.

The Jewish population in England was never large. It may have numbered 5,000 at its maximum in about 1200. Though they initially settled in London, the Jews ultimately established a presence in most sizeable English towns. By the end of the twelfth century, small Jewish communities could be found in towns as far north as York and as far west as Exeter.

Though they occasionally engaged in other professions, the medieval Jews earned their living mainly by acting as moneylenders. Canon Law prohibited Christians from charging interest so the Jews were able to fill this gap in the medieval economy. It was their usefulness as a source of revenue that ensured the Jews enjoyed a close relationship with the Crown. Successive kings took steps to protect the Jews in return for being allowed to tax them more or less at will.

Being of an alien race and religion, and moneylenders as well, the Jews inevitably became the target of a good deal of hostility, and there were outbreaks of violence, most notably the massacre at York in 1190 at the time of Third Crusade. The medieval Jewish presence in England was ended in 1290 when Edward I issued his Edict of Expulsion banished the entire population, forcing the roughly 2,000 to 3,000 remaining Jews to leave the country entirely. Oliver Cromwell permitted Jews to return to England in 1656.

=== Flemings ===
The Middle Ages saw several substantial waves of Flemish migration to England, Wales and Scotland. The term "Fleming" was used to refer to natives of the Low Countries overall rather than Flanders specifically.

The first wave of Flemings arrived in England following floods in their low-lying homelands during the reign of Henry I. Eventually, the migrants were planted in Pembrokeshire in Wales. According to the Brut y Tywysogyon, the native inhabitants were driven from the area, with the Flemish replacing them. This region, in which Flemish and English were spoken from an early date, came to be known as Little England beyond Wales.

Many of the early Flemish settlers in England were weavers, and established themselves in the larger English towns and cities. In Scotland, Flemish incomers contributed to the burgeoning wool trade in the southeastern part of the country.

== Roma in Britain ==
Romani people originated in the Punjab region of North India as a nomadic people. They entered Europe between the 8th and 10th centuries C.E., arriving in Western Europe by the 15th century. They were called "Gypsies", because Europeans mistakenly believed that they came from Egypt. This minority is made up of distinct groups called "tribes" or "nations". Roma spoke dialects of their common language, the Romani language, which is based on Sanskrit (the classical language of India), and is similar to other Indo-Aryan languages.

Roma in Britain have been documented since the early 16th century. The Egyptians Act 1530 was a response to the arrival of Romani Gypsies, known as "Egyptians" at the time, in Britain in the 16th century. The first definite record of Roma in Scotland was in 1505, and in England in 1513 or 1514. They were initially travellers, largely working as hawkers, basket weavers, craftsmen, blacksmiths and other occupations, but also as hostlers, jockeys, horse dealers, and many other occupations that involve working with horses.

== Early modern ==
=== Huguenots ===
The Huguenots, French Protestants facing persecution following the revocation of the Edict of Nantes, began to move to England in large numbers around 1670, after King Charles II offered them sanctuary. Most came from regions in western France such as Poitou, and in all some 40–50,000 arrived. Though many towns and cities in England served as destinations for the Huguenot migrants, the largest number settled in the Spitalfields area of London, and, being former silk-weavers, brought new energy to this industry in the area and raised silk to an important fashion item in Britain.

=== South Asians ===
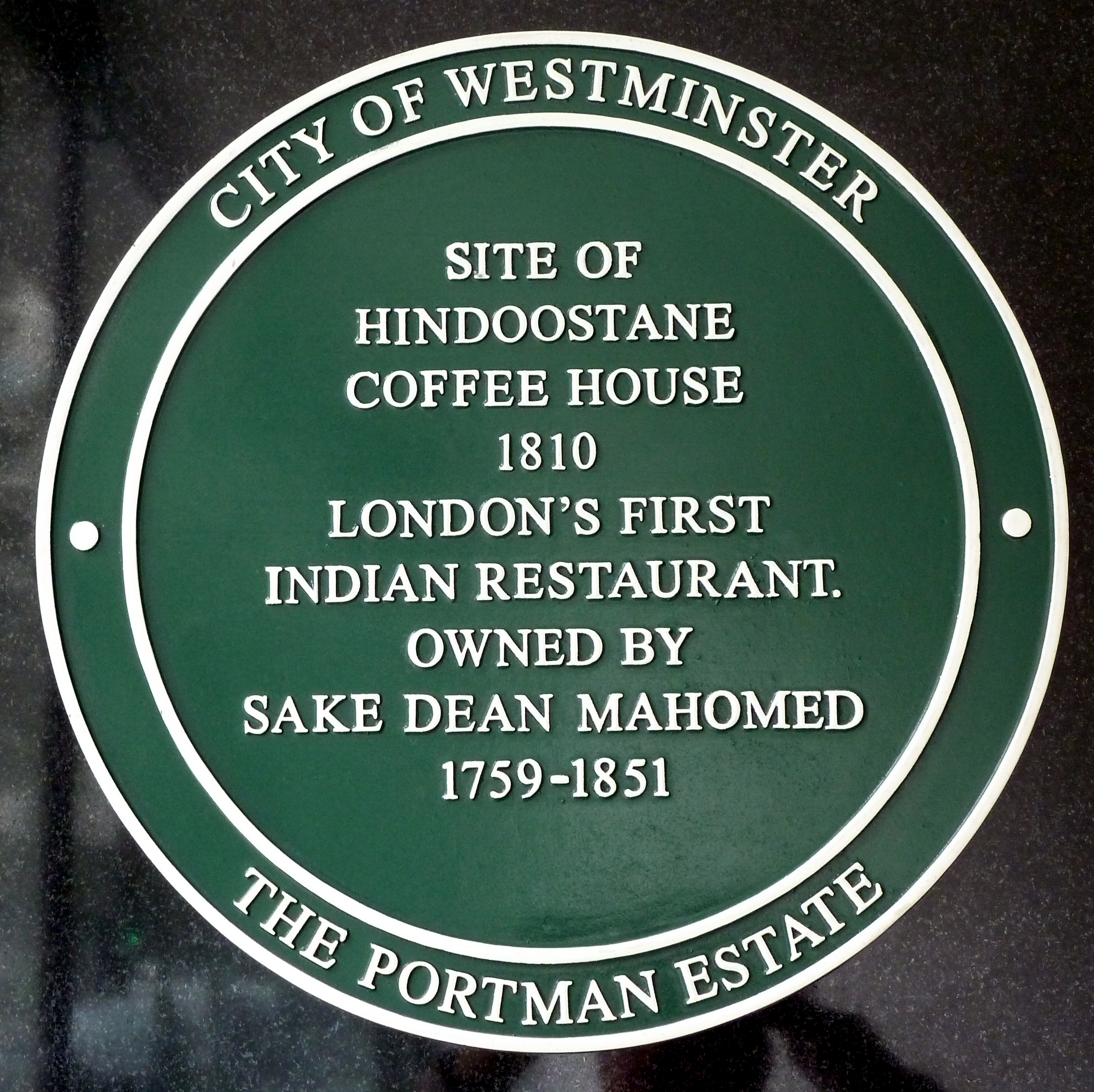
Plaque commemorating Sake Dean Mahomed and Britain's first Indian restaurant that he opened in 1810

People from the Indian subcontinent have settled in Great Britain since the East India Company (EIC) recruited lascars to replace vacancies in their crews on East Indiamen whilst on voyages in India. Many were then refused passage back, and were marooned in London. There were also some ayahs, domestic servants and nannies of wealthy British families, who accompanied their employers back to "Blighty" when their stay in Asia came to an end.

The number of seamen from the East Indies employed on English ships was felt so worrisome at that time that the English tried to restrict their numbers by the Navigation Act 1660, which restricted the employment of overseas sailors to a quarter of the crew on returning East India Company ships. The number of lascars employed on EIC East Indiamen was so great that the Parliament of England restricted their employment via the Navigation Acts (in force from 1660 onwards) which required that 75% of the crew onboard English-flagged ships importing goods from Asia be English subjects. In 1797, thirteen were buried in the parish of St Nicholas at Deptford. Between 1600 and 1857, around 20,000 to 40,000 Indian seamen, diplomats, scholars, soldiers, officials, tourists, businessmen and students in Great Britain had travelled to Britain, mostly temporarily. Most Indians during this period would visit or reside in Britain temporarily, returning to India after months or several years, bringing back knowledge about Britain in the process. In 1855 more than 25,000 of these were lascar seamen working on British ships.

Some settled in port towns and cities in Britain, often because of restrictions such as the Navigation Act or due to being stranded as well as suffering ill treatment. Some were abandoned and fell into poverty due to quotas on how many lascars could serve on a single ship. Lascars sometimes lived in Christian charity homes, boarding houses and barracks. Due to the majority of early Asian immigrants being lascars, the earliest Asian communities were found in port towns. Naval cooks also came, many of them from the Sylhet Division of what is now Bangladesh. One of the most famous 18th-century Bengali immigrants to Britain was Sake Dean Mahomed, a captain of the East India Company. In 1810, he founded London's first Indian restaurant, the Hindoostane Coffee House. He is also claimed as the person who introduced shampoo and therapeutic massage to Britain. By the 1930s about 7 to 10 thousand Indians had settled permanently in Britain.

== Modern ==
Year	Foreign-born population of England and Wales	Total population	Irish-born population	Percentage of total population born abroad
1901	475,000	32,500,000	425,000	1.5
1911	900,000	32,500,000	375,000	2.5
1921	750,000	37,900,000	365,000	2
1931	1,080,000	40,000,000	380,000	2.7
1951	1,875,000	43,700,000	470,000	4.3
1961	2,290,000	46,000,000	645,000	5.0
1971	3,100,000	48,700,000	585,000	6.4
1981	3,220,000	48,500,000	580,000	6.6
1991	3,625,000	49,900,000	570,000	7.3
2001	4,600,000	52,500,000	475,000	8.8
2011	7,500,000	56,000,000	400,000	13.4
2021	10,000,000	59,600,000	325,000	16.8

=== Irish (modern) ===
There has been continuous migration from Ireland to Britain since before the Middle Ages, but the number of arrivals increased significantly in the nineteenth century, due to the Great Famine and job opportunities offered by the Industrial Revolution. The Irish communities in west coast cities such as Liverpool and Glasgow were particularly significant.

=== Africans ===
Following the British defeat in the American War of Independence over 1,100 Black Loyalist troops who had fought on the losing side were transported to Britain, but they mostly ended up destitute on London's streets and were viewed as a social problem. The Committee for the Relief of the Black Poor was formed. They distributed relief and helped the men to go overseas, some to what remained of British North America. In 1786, the committee funded an expedition of 280 black men, forty black women and seventy white wives and girlfriends to Sierra Leone. The settlement failed and within two years all but sixty of the migrants had died.

=== Germans ===
Throughout the 19th century a small population of German immigrants built up in Britain, numbering 28,644 in 1861. London held around half of this population, and other small communities existed in Manchester, Bradford and elsewhere. The German immigrant population was the largest group until 1891, when it became second only to Russian Jews. There was a mixture of classes and religious groupings, and a flourishing culture built up, with the growth of middle and working class clubs. Waiters and clerks were two main occupations, and many who worked in these professions went on to become restaurant owners and businessmen, to a considerable extent. This population maintained its size until the First World War, when public anti-German feeling became very prominent and the Government enacted a policy of forced internment and repatriation. The population in 1911 had reached 53,324, but fell to just over 20,000 after the war.

=== Russian Jews ===
England has had small Jewish communities for many centuries, subject to occasional expulsions, but British Jews numbered fewer than 10,000 at the start of the 19th century. After 1881 Russian Jews suffered bitter persecutions, and British Jews led fund-raising to enable their Russian co-religionists to immigrate to the United States. However, out of some 2,000,000 who left Russia by 1914, around 120,000 settled permanently in Britain. One of the main concentrations was the same Spitalfields area where Huguenots had earlier congregated. Immigration was reduced by the Aliens Act 1905 and virtually curtailed by the 1914 Aliens Restriction Act. In addition to those Russian Jews who settled permanently in the UK an estimated 500,000 Eastern European Jews transmigrated through British ports between 1881 and 1924. Most were bound for the United States and others migrated to Canada, South Africa, Latin America and the Antipodes.

Estimated number of migrants between 1800 and 1945

Migrant group	Migration 1800–1945 (145 years)		Migration 1945–2010 (65 years)	
Migrant group	Numbers	% makeup of period	Numbers	% makeup of period
Africans	10,000	0.4%	1,000,000	16%
Americans	70,000	3%	250,000	4%
Arabs	10,000	0.4%	290,000	4.6%
Belgians	240,000	10.3%	40,000	0.6%
Chinese	20,000	0.9%	320,000	5.1%
Cypriots	2,000	–	80,000	1.3%
French	40,000	1.7%	100,000	1.6%
Germans	100,000	4.3%	300,000	4.8%
Hungarians	2,000	–	38,000	0.6%
Irish	1,500,000	64.1%	700,000	11.2%
Italians	40,000	1.7%	160,000	2.6%
Jews	220,000	9.4%	80,000	1.3%
Poles	5,000	0.2%	500,000	8%
South Asians	20,000	0.9%	1,000,000	16%
West Indians	10,000	0.4%	400,000	6.4%
Others Greek/Caribbean etc	50,000	2.1%	1,000,000	16%
Total migration	2,339,000	100%	6,231,000	100%
Average migration per year	16,131	–	95,862	–

=== Immigration since 1945 ===
Since 1945, immigration to the United Kingdom has been significant. About 70% of the population increase between the 2001 and 2011 censuses was due to foreign-born immigration.

Long-term net migration is estimated to have reached a record high of 944,000 in the year ending (YE) March 2023, with immigration at 1,469,000 and emigration at 525,000.

For the year ending (YE) June 2025, the top three nationalities from non-EU+ countries immigrating on work-related visas were Indian, Pakistani, and Nigerian.

== Genetic history ==
Genetic studies have been used to calculate the impact of various historical migrations on the population of the British Isles. The most recent work, carried out using data collected from ancient skeletons, has suggested that the migration events which most drastically influenced the genetic makeup of the current British population were the arrival of the Bell Beaker people around 2500 BC, and the influx of the Anglo-Saxons following the Roman withdrawal.

Studies of DNA suggest that the biological influence on Britain of immigration from the Norman conquests up until the 20th century was small; The native population's genetics was marked more by stability than change.

=== Y Chromosome analysis ===
From Genetic analysis section, Sub-Roman Britain

Modern genetic evidence, based on analysis of the Y chromosomes of men currently living in Britain, the Western Isles, Orkney, Shetland, Friesland, Denmark, North Germany, Ireland, Norway and the Basque Country, is consistent with the presence of some indigenous component in all British regions. For the sake of this study samples from the Basque Country were considered indigenous (a putative paleolithic Y chromosome). These studies cannot significantly distinguish between Danish, Frisian and German (Schleswig-Holstein) Y chromosomes although the Frisians were slightly closer to the indigenous samples. Areas with the highest concentration of Germanic (Danish-Viking/Anglo-Saxon) Y chromosomes occurred in areas associated with the Danelaw and Danish-Viking settlement, especially York and Norfolk. In these areas, about 60% of Y chromosomes are of Germanic origin.

This indicates an exclusively male component. The extent of Danish/Anglo-Saxon contribution to the entire gene pool of these areas is also dependent on the migration of women. For example, if it is assumed that few or no Germanic women settled in these areas, then the Germanic contribution to the gene pool is halved to 30%, and in turn if greater numbers of women did settle, the contribution could be even higher than 60%.

Current estimates on the initial contribution of Anglo-Saxon migrants range from less than 10,000 to as many as 200,000, although some recent Y-chromosome studies posit a considerably large continental (Germanic) contribution to the current English gene pool (50–100%). A recent study by a team from the Department of Biology at University College London based on computer simulations indicate that an apartheid-like social structure in early Anglo-Saxon England provides a plausible explanation for a high-degree of continental male-line ancestry in England.

=== Mitochondrial DNA analysis ===
This indicates that a majority of maternal lines in the population go back to the Palaeolithic and Mesolithic periods. The lines tend to be similar in all parts of Britain, though with Norse input in the Northern and Western Isles of Scotland. The source of many of the other lines is thought to be the Iberian Peninsula, but there has been some input from the Germanic areas into the east coast of England.
