= Religion in England =

Religion in England, 2021 census
1. Christianity (46.3%)
2. No religion (36.7%)
3. Islam (6.70%)
4. Hinduism (1.80%)
5. Sikhism (0.90%)
6. Buddhism (0.50%)
7. Judaism (0.50%)
8. Other religions (0.60%)
9. Religion not stated (6.00%)

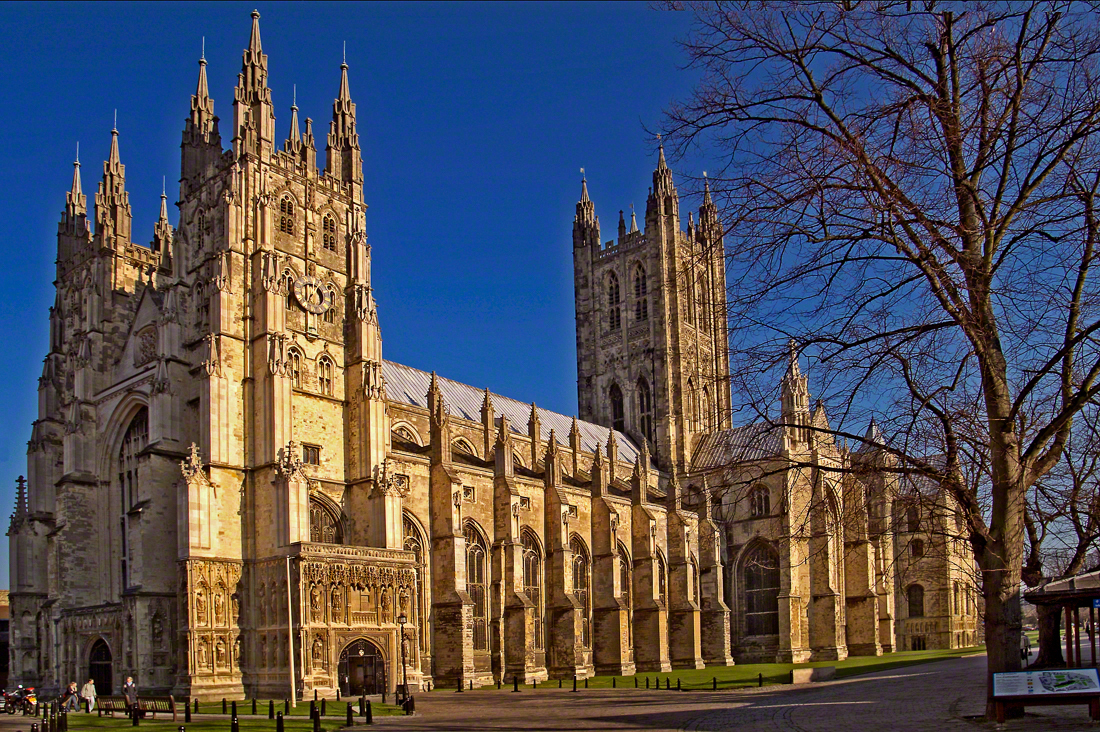
Canterbury Cathedral is the cathedral of the Archbishop of Canterbury and a World Heritage Site.

Religion in England is characterised by a variety of beliefs and practices that has historically been dominated by Christianity. Christianity remains the largest religion, though it makes up less than half of the population. As of the 2021 census, there is an increasing variety of beliefs, with irreligious people outnumbering each of the other religions. The Church of England is the nation's established state church, whose supreme governor is the monarch.

Other Christian traditions in England include Roman Catholicism, Methodism, Presbyterianism, Mormonism, and the Baptists. After Christianity, the religions with the most adherents are Islam, Hinduism, Sikhism, Judaism, Buddhism, modern paganism, and the Bahá'í Faith. There are also organisations promoting irreligion, including humanism and atheism. In the 2021 census, Shamanism was the fastest growing religion in England.

Many of England's most notable buildings and monuments are religious in nature: Westminster Abbey, Canterbury Cathedral and St Paul's Cathedral. The festivals of Christmas and Easter are widely celebrated in the country.

== Statistics ==
The 2001 and 2011 censuses in England and Wales did not include a question on adherence to individual Christian denominations; this was asked only in Scotland and Northern Ireland. Using the same principle as applied in the 2001 census, a 2008 survey by Ipsos MORI and based on a scientifically robust sample, found the population of England and Wales to be 47.0% affiliated with the Church of England, which is also the state church, and 9.6% with the Roman Catholic Church.

8.7% were other Christians, mainly Free Church Protestants and Eastern Orthodox. Muslims were 4.8%, and 3.4% were members of other religions. 5.3% were agnostics, 6.8% were atheists and 15.0% were not sure about their religious affiliation or did not answer the question.

Religion	2001		2011		2021	
Religion	Number	%	Number	%	Number	%
Christianity	35,251,244	71.7	31,479,876	59.4	26,167,899	46.3
No religion	7,171,332	14.6	13,114,232	24.7	20,715,664	36.7
Islam	1,524,887	3.1	2,660,116	5.0	3,801,186	6.7
Hinduism	546,982	1.1	806,199	1.5	1,020,533	1.8
Sikhism	327,343	0.7	420,196	0.8	520,092	0.9
Judaism	257,671	0.5	261,282	0.5	269,283	0.5
Buddhism	139,046	0.3	238,626	0.5	262,433	0.5
Other religion	143,811	0.3	227,825	0.4	332,410	0.6
Religion not stated	3,776,515	7.7	3,804,104	7.2	3,400,548	6.0
Total population	49,138,831	100.0	53,012,456	100.0	56,490,048	100.0

== Abrahamic religions ==
=== Christianity ===
==== Demographics ====
Historical Population
Year	Pop.	±%
2001	35,251,244	—
2011	31,479,876	−10.7%
2021	26,167,899	−16.9%
Religious affiliation was not recorded prior to 2001.

British Christians by Ethnic group and nationality
Ethnic group	2021		
Ethnic group	Number	Christians as % of ethnic group	Ethnic group as % of Christians
White	23,402,349	51.12%	89.43%
– British	20,506,667	49.36%	78.37%
– Irish	354,595	71.74%	1.36%
– Roma	71,268	71.89%	0.27%
– Irish Traveller	40,352	62.84%	0.15%
– Other White	2,152,950	60.05%	8.25%
Mixed	611,454	36.63%	2.34%
– White and Black Caribbean	191,402	38.33%	0.73%
– White and Asian	130,061	27.43%	0.50%
– White and Black African	119,377	49.43%	0.46%
– Other Mixed	170,614	37.55%	0.65%
Asian	555,733	10.24%	2.34%
– Indian	220,688	11.97%	0.84%
– Pakistani	11,953	0.76%	0.05%
– Bangladeshi	2,119	0.34%	0.01%
– Chinese	74,637	17.31%	0.29%
– Other Asian	246,336	25.87%	0.94%
Black	1,598,363	67.11%	6.11%
– African	967,405	65.88%	3.69%
– Caribbean	428,150	69.12%	1.64%
– Other Black	202,448	68.90%	0.77%
Other	276,517	22.49%	1.06%
– Arab	13,278	4.15%	0.05%
– Other Ethnic group	263,239	28.96%	1.01%

==== History of Christianity ====
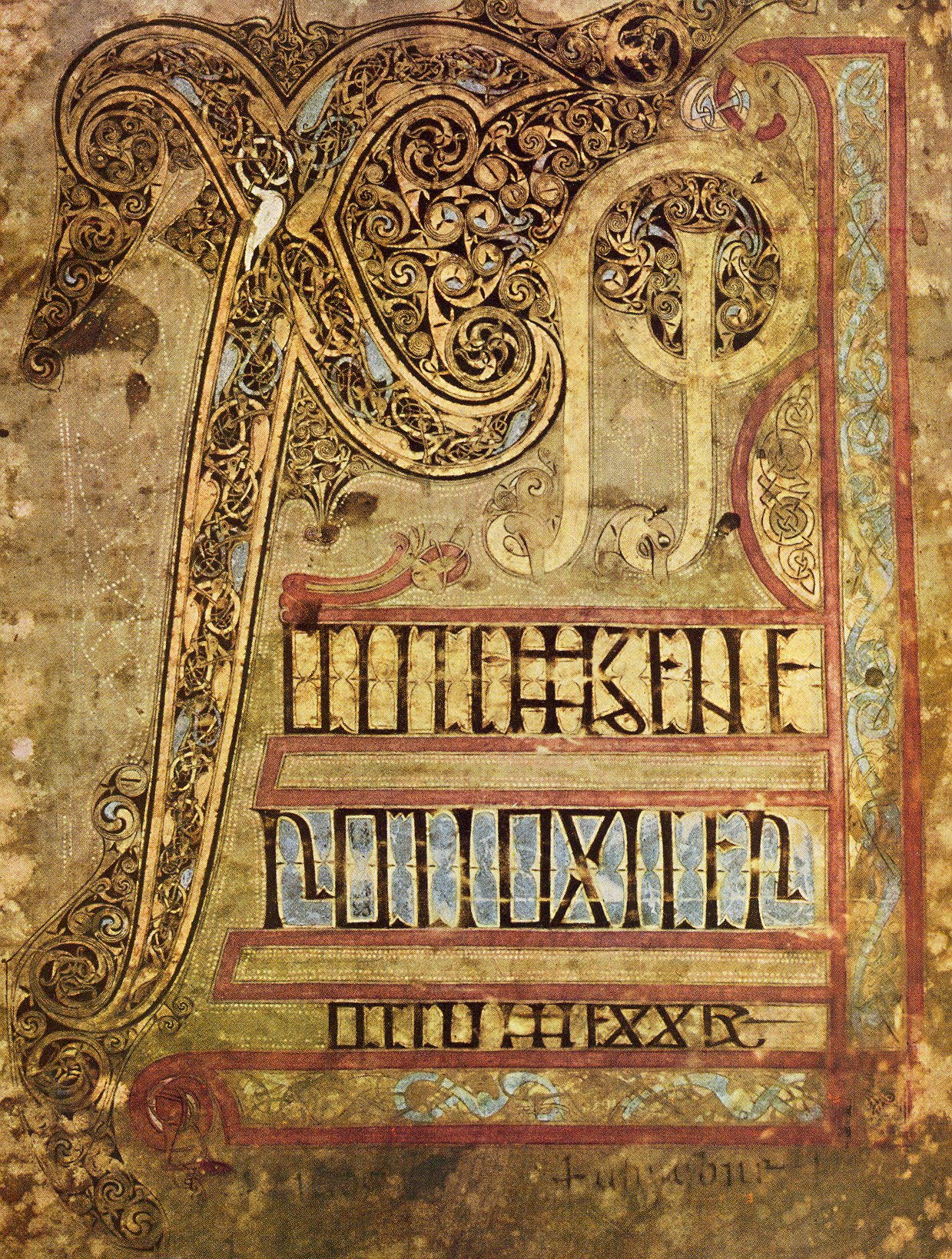
The illuminated Chi-rho page of the 8th-century Lichfield Gospels.

Saint George is recognised as the patron saint of England and the flag of England consists of his cross. Prior to Edward III, the patron saint was St Edmund. St Alban is also honoured as England's first martyr. Other notable saints from the early period of Christianity in England include Saint Ethelbert and Saint Morwenna.

==== Protestantism ====
===== Church of England (Anglicanism) =====
The established church of the realm is the Church of England, whose supreme governor is the British monarch, currently King Charles III. In practice, the church is governed by its bishops under the authority of Parliament. Twenty-six of the church's 42 bishops are Lords Spiritual, representing the church in the House of Lords. The dioceses of England are divided between the two provinces of Canterbury and York, both of whose archbishops are considered primates.

The church regards itself as the continuation of the Catholic church introduced by St Augustine's late 6th-century mission to Kent as part of the Christianisation of Anglo-Saxon England, although this is disputed owing to procedural and doctrinal changes introduced by the 16th-century English Reformation, particularly the Thirty-Nine Articles of Religion and the Book of Common Prayer. In 2010, the Church of England counted 25 million baptised members out of the 41 million Christians in Great Britain's population of about 60 million. In 2009, it claimed to baptise one in eight newborn children.

In 2018, research conducted by YouGov found that 56% of Christians in England identified as members of the Church of England. The same study found that 63% of those identifying with the Church of England "never or hardly" attend church. In 2016, according to a research survey, 19.8% of the population of England and Wales identified as Anglican; additionally half of those who reported being raised Anglican identified as 'No religion.' Generally, anyone in England may marry or be buried at their local parish church, whether or not they have been baptised in the church. Actual attendance has declined steadily since 1890, with around one million, or 10% of the baptised population attending Sunday services on a regular basis, defined as once a month or more. Three million- roughly 15%- join Christmas Eve and Christmas services. In 2012, there were around 18 000 active and ordained clergy.

The Free Church of England is another Anglican denomination which separated from the Church of England in the 19th century in opposition to shifts in doctrine and ceremony which brought the established church closer to Roman Catholicism. The Free Church of England is in communion with the Reformed Episcopal Church in the United States and Canada.

No other church in England has more than a million members, with most quite small.

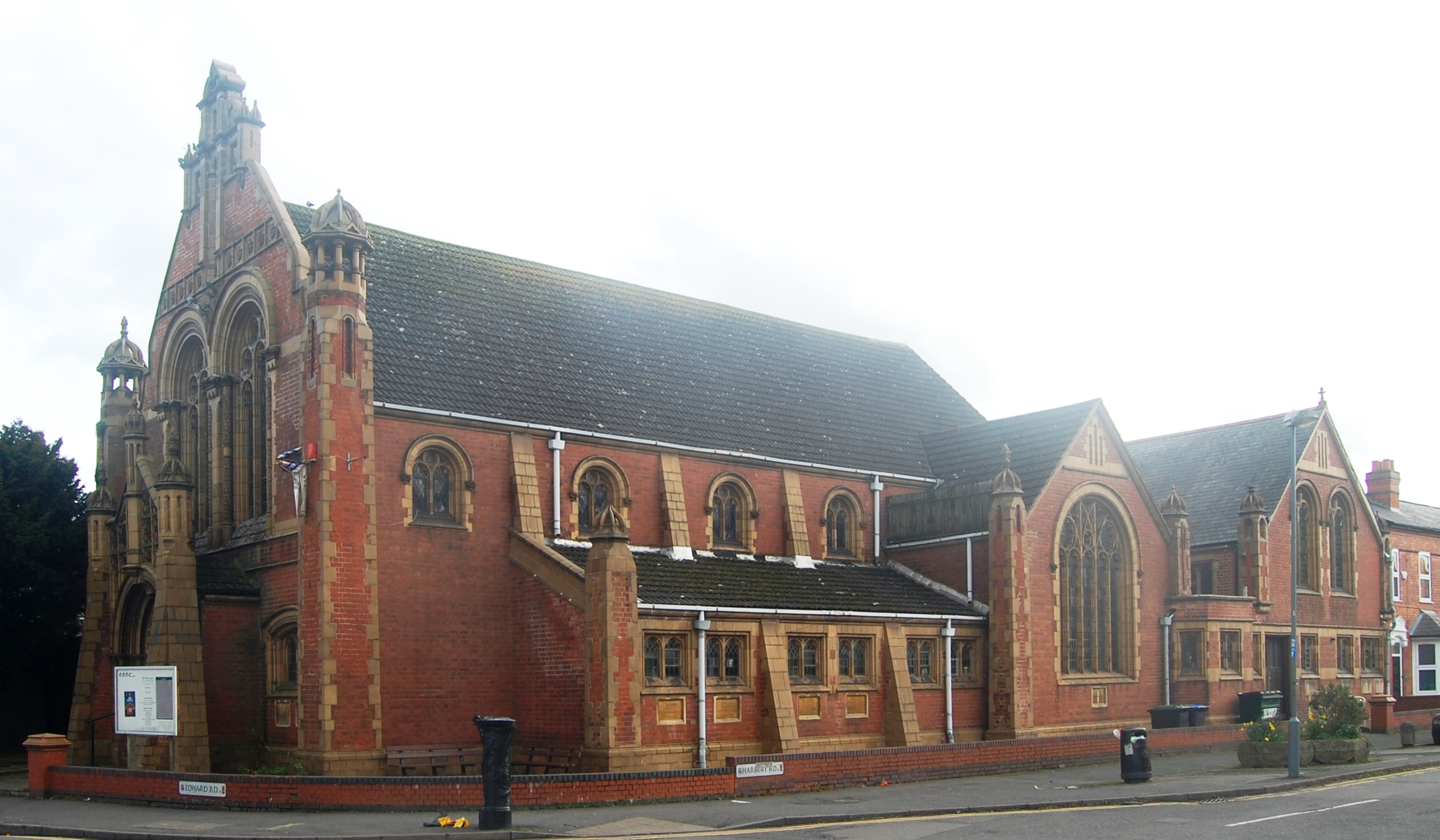
A Baptist church in Birmingham, West Midlands.

Pentecostal churches are growing and, in terms of church attendance, are now third after the Church of England and the Roman Catholic Church. There are three main denominations of Pentecostal churches: the Assemblies of God in Great Britain (part of the World Assemblies of God Fellowship), the Apostolic Church, and the Elim Pentecostal Church. Countess of Huntingdon's Connexion is a small society of evangelical churches, founded in 1783, which today has 23 congregations in England. There is also a growing number of independent, charismatic churches that encourage Pentecostal practices at part of their worship, such as Kingsgate Community Church in Peterborough, which started with 9 people in 1988 and now has a congregation in excess of 1,500.

Various forms of Protestantism developed from the ferment of the English Civil War onwards. The Quakers (formally, the Religious Society of Friends) were founded by George Fox in the 1640s. Following the Great Ejection of 1662, about a tenth of Church of England ministers gave up their livings to lead the newly formed dissenting churches. Notable dissenting groups were the Presbyterians, the Independents (or Congregationalists) and the Baptists. In the 18th century some Presbyterians favoured ideas known as Rational Dissent which evolved into, among others, Unitarianism, which still has more than 100 congregations in the 21st century.

Methodism developed from the 18th century onwards. The Methodist revival was started in England by a group of men including John Wesley and his younger brother Charles as a movement within the Church of England, but developed as a separate denomination after John Wesley's death. The primary church in England is the Methodist Church of Great Britain. The Salvation Army dates back to 1865, when it was founded in East London by William and Catherine Booth. Its international headquarters are still in London, near St Paul's Cathedral. There is one Mennonite congregation in England, the Wood Green Mennonite Church in London.

==== Catholicism ====
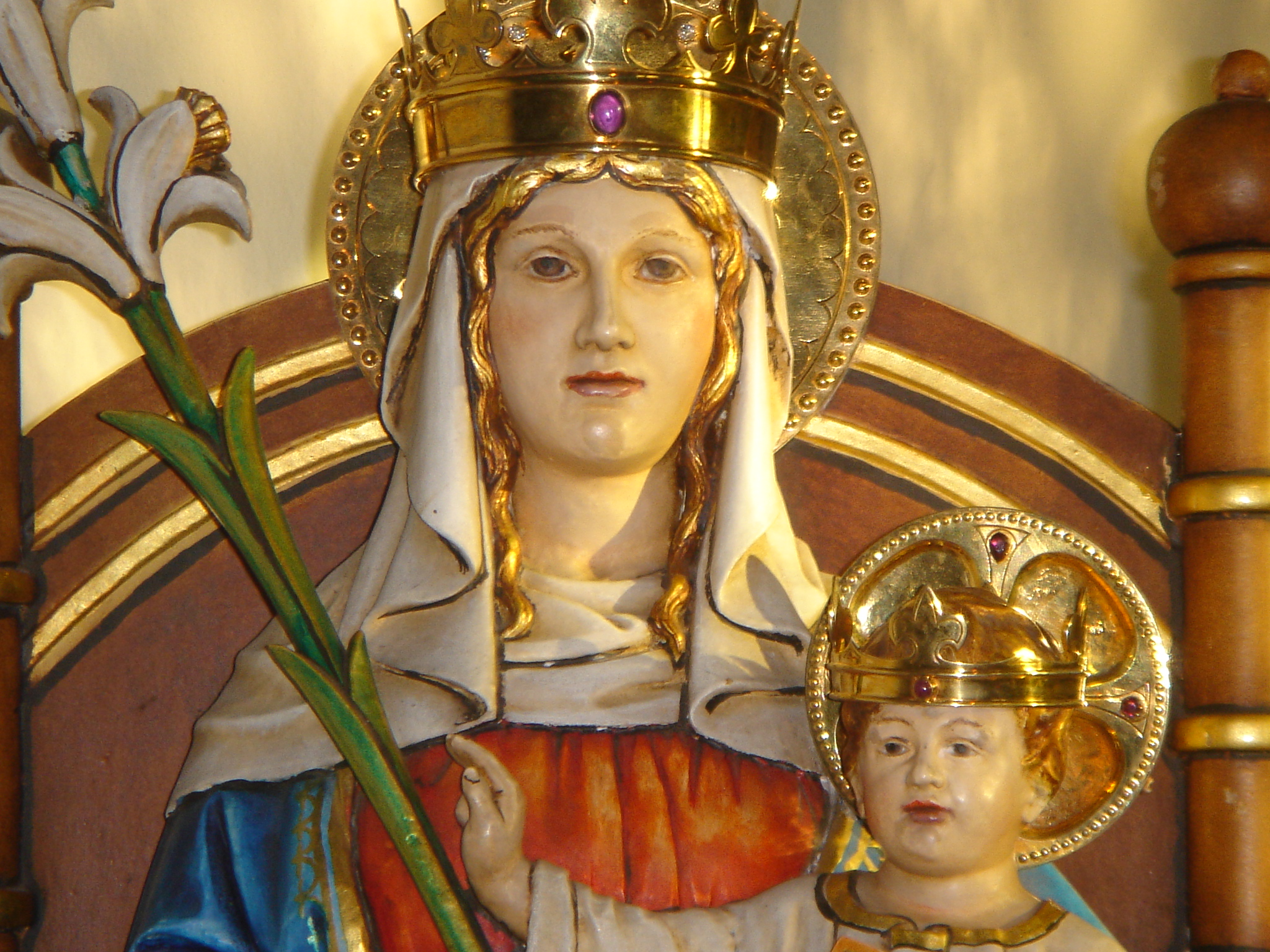
Our Lady of Walsingham

The Catholic Church in England and Wales is directed by the Catholic Bishops' Conference of England and Wales, whose current president is Vincent Nichols, the Archbishop of Westminster. To highlight the historical Catholic continuity of Nichols' office, dating back to Pope Gregory I's appointment of St. Augustine and that pope's sequent bestowal of the pallium on the appointee, the installation rites of pre-Reformation Catholic Archbishops of Canterbury and earlier Archbishops of Westminster were used at his installation as Cardinal Archbishop of Westminster.

In 1851, the Catholic Church was formerly forbidden from using the names of the Anglican dioceses by the Ecclesiastical Titles Act. It is divided among five provinces headed by the archbishops of Westminster, Liverpool, Birmingham, and Southwark in England and Cardiff in Wales. The Catholic Church considers itself a continuation of the earliest Celtic Christian communities, although its formal hierarchy needed to be refounded by the Gregorian mission to the Saxon kingdoms in the 6th and 7th centuries and again following the English Reformation.

In 1766, Papal recognition of George III as the legitimate ruler of Great Britain opened the way for the Catholic Emancipation, easing and ultimately eliminating the anti-Catholic Penal Laws and Test Acts. This process sometimes faced great popular opposition, as during the 1780 Gordon Riots in London. Daniel O'Connell was the first Catholic member of Parliament. Considering the "actual condition of Catholicism in England," the number of Catholics, and the obstacles "removed which chiefly opposed" it, Pope Pius IX issued in 1850 the bull Universalis Ecclesiae to restore "the normal diocesan hierarchy." More recently, the royal family has been permitted to marry Roman Catholics without fear of being disqualified from succession to the throne.

The number of Catholics peaked in the 1960s, but has been on a gradual decline ever since. Recent immigration from Catholic countries, particularly Poland and Lithuania, has slowed the church's decline. Polling in 2009 suggested there were about 5.2 million Catholics in England and Wales, about 9.6% of the population, concentrated in the northwest. In 2018, research conducted by YouGov found that 17% of all Christians in England identified as Catholic. In 2016, 8.3% of the population of England and Wales identified Catholic. In 2007, some studies showed that weekly attendance at Catholic masses exceeded that of the Anglican services.

==== Orthodox ====
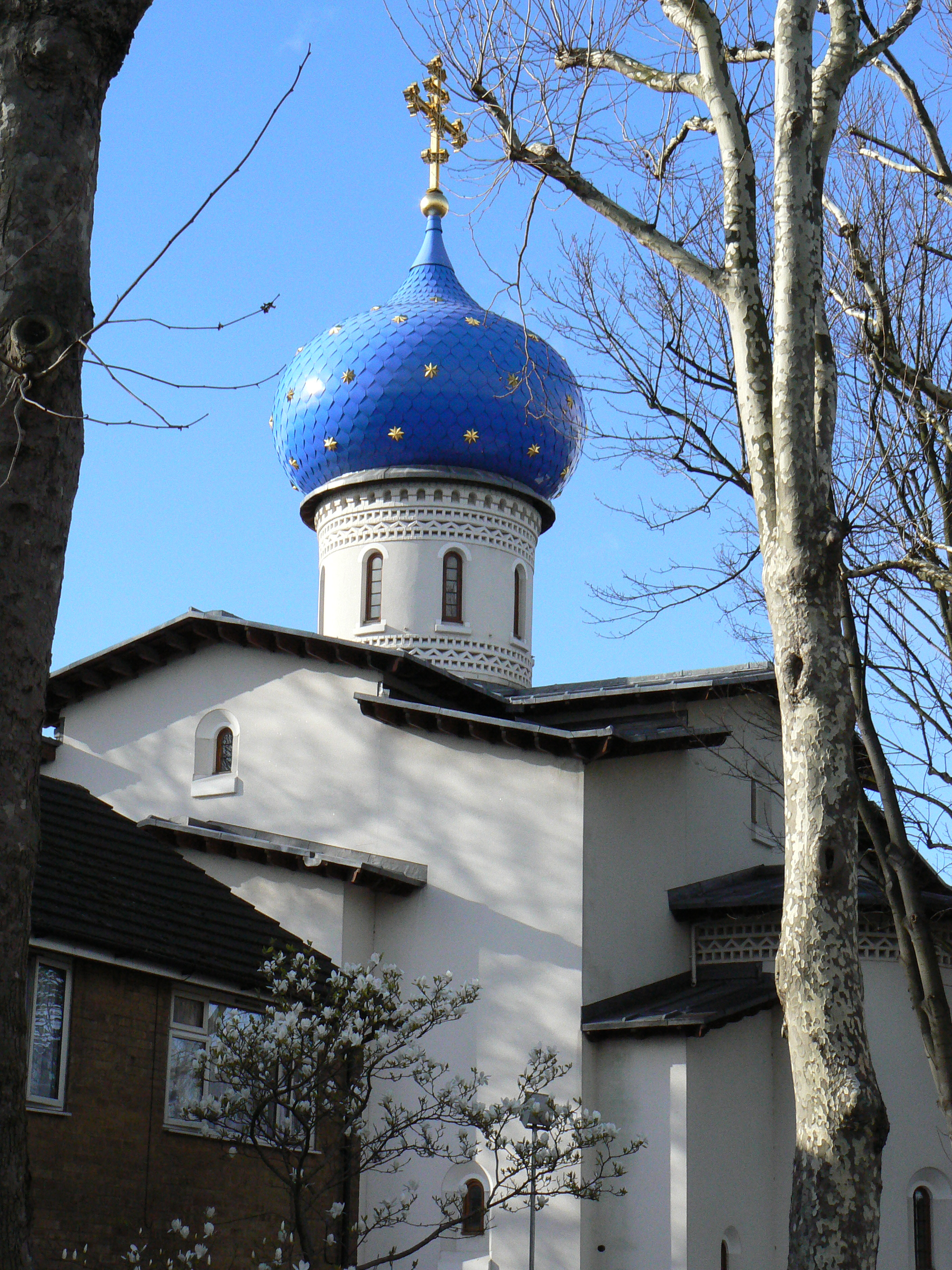
The Cathedral of the Dormition of the Most-Holy Mother of God and the Holy Royal Martyrs in Gunnersbury.

Most Greek Orthodox Church parishes fall under the jurisdiction of the Archdiocese of Thyateira and Great Britain, based in London and led by Nikitas, the Archbishop of Thyateira and Great Britain. Created in 1932, it is the diocese of the Ecumenical Patriarch of Constantinople that covers England, Wales and Scotland. A Greek Orthodox community already existed at the time the UK was formed, worshipping in the Imperial Russian Embassy in London. in 1837, an autonomous community was set up in Finsbury Park in London. In 1850, the first new church was built, on London Street in the city.

In 1882, St Sophia Cathedral was constructed in London, in order to cope with the growing influx of Orthodox immigrants. By the outbreak of World War I, there were large Orthodox communities in London, Manchester and Liverpool, each focused on its own church. World War II and its aftermath also saw a large expansion among the Orthodox Communities. Today, there are seven churches bearing the title of Cathedral in London as well as in Birmingham (the Dormition of the Mother of God and St Andrew) and Leicester.

In addition to these, there are eighty-one churches and other places where worship is regularly offered, twenty-five places (including university chaplaincies) where the divine liturgy is celebrated on a less regular basis, four chapels (including that of the Archdiocese), and two monasteries. As is traditional within the Orthodox Church, the bishops have a considerable degree of autonomy within the Archdiocese. The Greek Orthodox Church of St Nicholas in Toxteth, Liverpool, was built in 1870. It is an enlarged version of St Theodore's church in Constantinople and is a Grade II Listed building.

There are Russian Orthodox groups in England. In 1962, Metropolitan Anthony (Bloom) of Sourozh founded and was for many years the bishop, archbishop and then metropolitan bishop of the diocese of the Russian Orthodox Diocese of Sourozh, the Moscow Patriarchate's diocese for Great Britain and Ireland. It is the most numerous Russian Orthodox group in the country. There are also the Russian Orthodox Church Outside Russia churches and some churches and communities belonging to the Patriarchal Exarchate for Orthodox Parishes of Russian Tradition in Western Europe's Episcopal Vicariate in the UK.

As well as the Russian and Greek Orthodox churches, there are also the Serbian Orthodox Church and the Ukrainian Orthodox Church all in London and a non-canonical Belarusian Autocephalous Orthodox Church in Manchester. The Antiochian Orthodox Church have the St. George's Cathedral in London and a number of parishes across England.

All Coptic Orthodox parishes fall under the jurisdiction of the Coptic Orthodox Church of Alexandria Pope of Alexandria. The Coptic Orthodox Church in Britain and Ireland is divided into three main districts: Ireland, Scotland, and North England; the Midlands and its affiliated areas; and South Wales. There is one Patriarchal Exarchate at Stevenage, Hertfordshire. There is also the Eritrean Orthodox Tewahedo Church and the Ethiopian Orthodox Tewahedo Church in London. There is also the Armenian Apostolic Church in London.

=== Islam ===
Muslim population in English local authority areas, 2011. 0.0%–0.9% 1%–1.9% 2%–4.9% 5%–9.9% 10%–19.9% 20+%

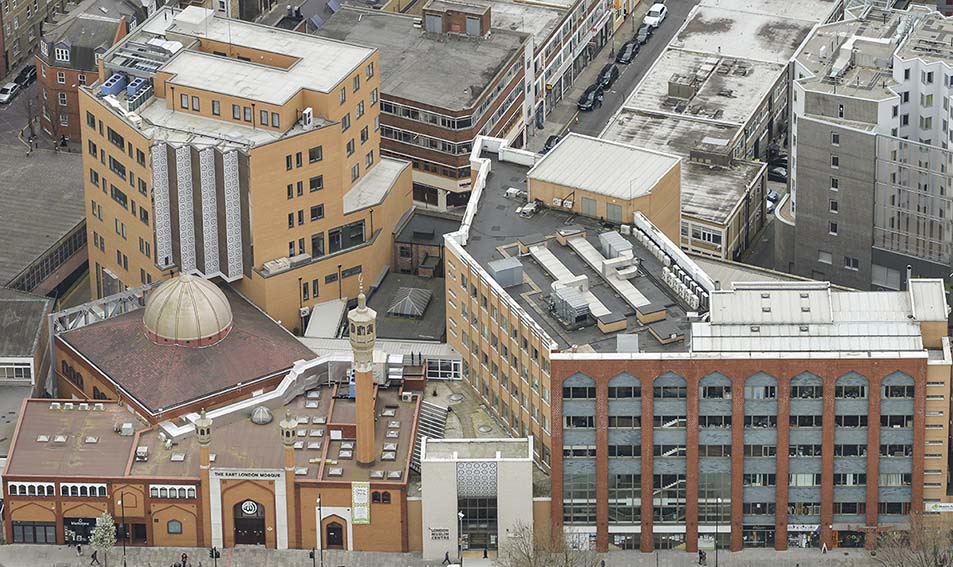
The East London Mosque was one of the first mosques in England to be allowed to broadcast the adhan using loudspeakers.

At the 2021 United Kingdom census, 3,801,186 Muslims lived in England, or 6.7% of the population. The Muslim population had grown by over a million compared to the 2011 census.

At the 2011 Census, 2.7 million Muslims lived in England, where they formed 5.0% of the population.

Although Islam is generally thought of as being a recent arrival to the country, there has been contact with Muslims for many centuries. One example is the decision of Offa, an eighth-century King of Mercia, one of the Anglo-Saxon kingdoms existing at that time, to have coins minted with an Islamic inscription on them—copies of coins issued by the near-contemporary Muslim ruler Al-Mansur. It is thought that they were minted to facilitate trade with the expanding Islamic empire in Spain.

Muslim scholarship was well known among the learned in England by 1386, when Chaucer was writing. In the Prologue to the Canterbury Tales, there is among the pilgrims wending their way to Canterbury, a 'Doctour of Phisyk' whose learning included Razi, Avicenna (Ibn Sina, Arabic ابن سينا) and Averroes (Ibn Rushd, Arabic ابن رشد). Ibn Sina's canon of medicine was a standard text for medical students well into the 17th century.

Today Islam is the second largest religion in England. In 2011, about 38% of English Muslims lived in London, where they made up 12.4% of the population. There are also large numbers of Muslims in Birmingham, Manchester, Bradford, Luton, Slough, Leicester and the mill towns of Northern England such as Huddersfield, Dewsbury, Oldham.

Notable mosques include the East London Mosque, London Central Mosque, Al-Rahma Mosque, Jamea Masjid, Birmingham Central Mosque, Finsbury Park Mosque, Al Mahdi Mosque, London Markaz and Markazi Mosque.

=== Judaism ===
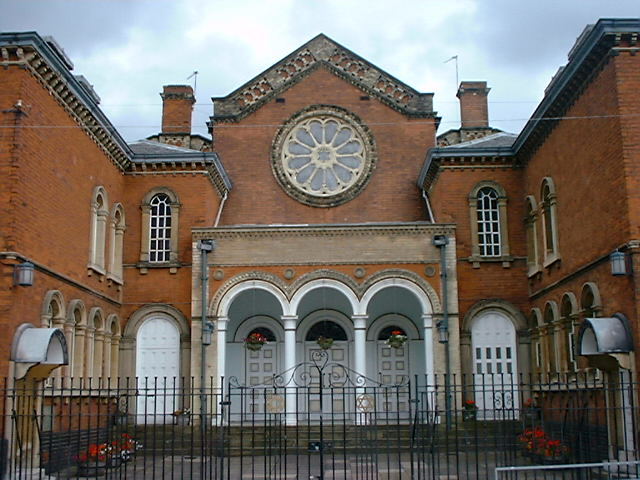
Singers Hill Synagogue, Birmingham, England.

Until the 20th century, Judaism was the only noticeable non-Christian religion having first appeared in historical records during the Norman Conquest of 1066. From 1290 to 1656, Judaism did not officially exist in England due to an outright expulsion in 1290 and official restrictions that were not lifted until 1656, though historical records show that some Jews came back to England during the early part of the 17th century prior to the lifting of the restriction. Now, the presence of the Jewish culture and Jews in England today is one of the largest in the world.

=== Baháʼí Faith ===
The Baháʼí Faith started with the earliest mentions of the predecessor of the Baháʼí Faith, the Báb, in The Times in November 1845, only a little over a year after the Báb first stated his mission. Today there are Baháʼí communities across the country from Carlisle to Cornwall.

== Dharmic religions ==
=== Hinduism ===
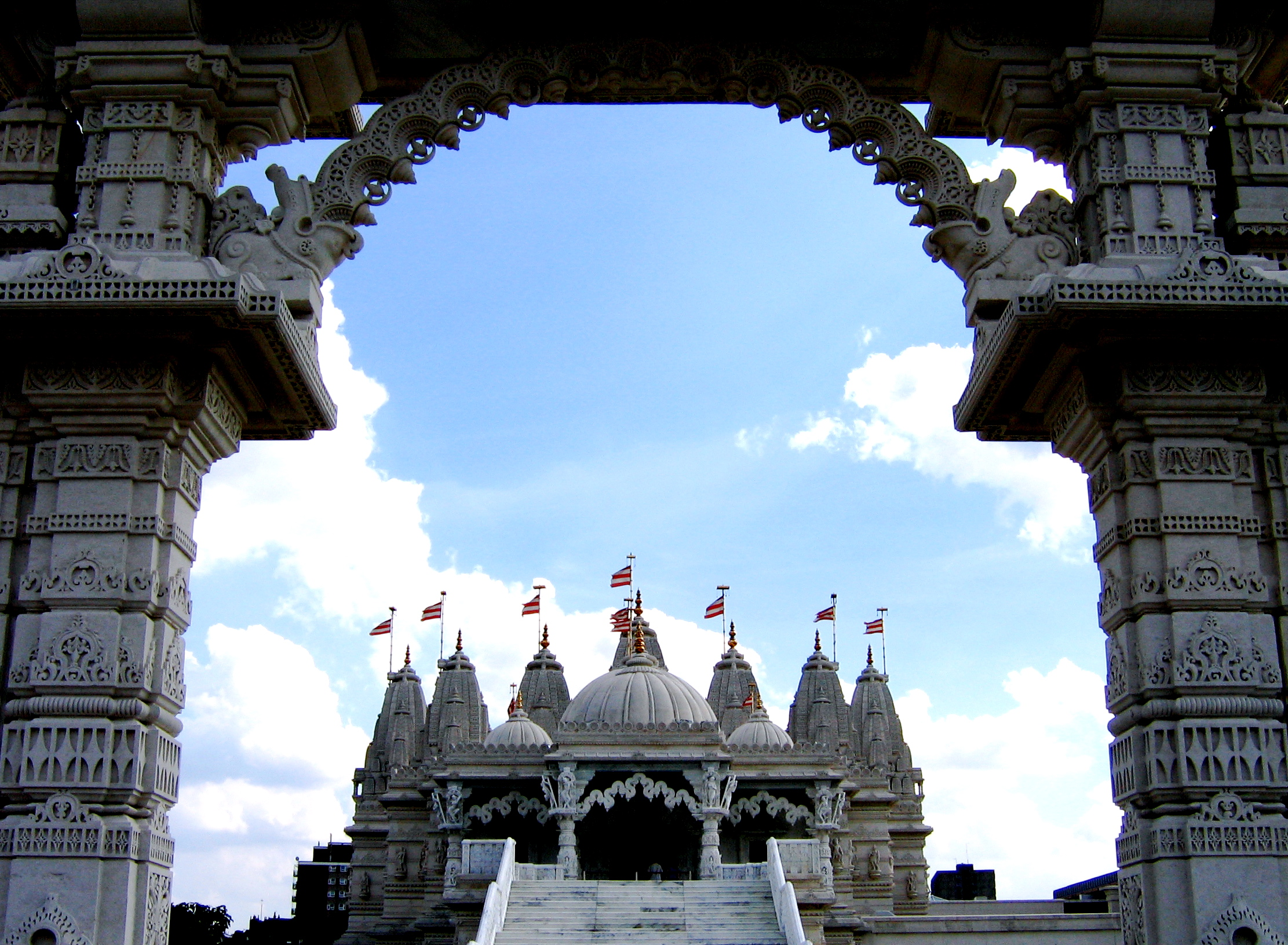
BAPS Shri Swaminarayan Mandir in London, United Kingdom is the largest Hindu temple in England.

Early Hindus in England were mostly students during the 19th century. There have been three waves of migration of Hindus to England since then.

Before India's Independence in 1947, Hindu migration was minuscule and largely temporary. In the 1970s, a second wave of Hindu migration occurred after the expulsion of Hindus from Uganda. Initially, Hindu immigration was limited to Punjabi and Gujarati Hindus, but, by 2000, small Hindu communities of every ethnicity were found in England.

England is also host to a large immigrant community of Sri Lankan Hindus who are mostly Tamils. The latest wave of migration of Hindus has been taking place since the 1990s, with refugees from Sri Lanka and professionals from India. There are an increasing number of English Western Hindus in England, who have either converted from another faith or been an English Hindu from birth.

=== Sikhism ===
In 1911, the first Sikh Gurdwara (temple) was established at Putney in London.

The first wave of Sikh migration came in the 1950s. It was mostly of men from the Punjab seeking work in industries like foundries and textiles. These new arrivals mostly settled in London, Birmingham and West Yorkshire. Thousands of Sikhs from East Africa soon followed. This mass immigration was caused by Idi Amin's persecution of ethnic groups in Uganda, with thousands forced to flee the region in fear of losing their lives.

=== Buddhism ===
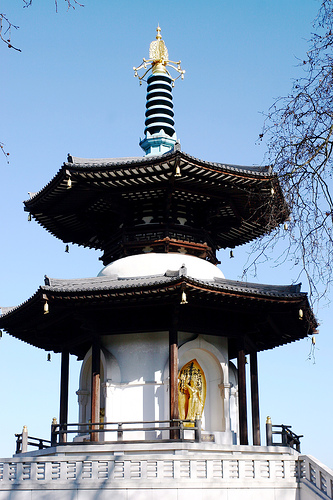
Buddhist peace pagoda at Battersea Park, London

The earliest Buddhist influence on England came through the UK's imperial connections with South East Asia, and as a result the early connections were with the Theravada traditions of Sri Lanka, Burma and Thailand. In the 1880s, a tradition of study resulted in the foundation of the Pali Text Society, which undertook the task of translating the Pali Canon of Buddhist texts into English.

In 1924, London's Buddhist Society was founded, and in 1926 the Theravadin London Buddhist Vihara. The rate of growth was slow but steady through the 20th century. The 1950s saw a growing interest in Zen Buddhism.

In the 1970s, a Theravāda monastic order of mainly Westerners following the Thai Forest Tradition of Ajahn Chah was established at Chithurst Buddhist Monastery in West Sussex, and established branches monasteries elsewhere in the country.

== Modern paganism ==
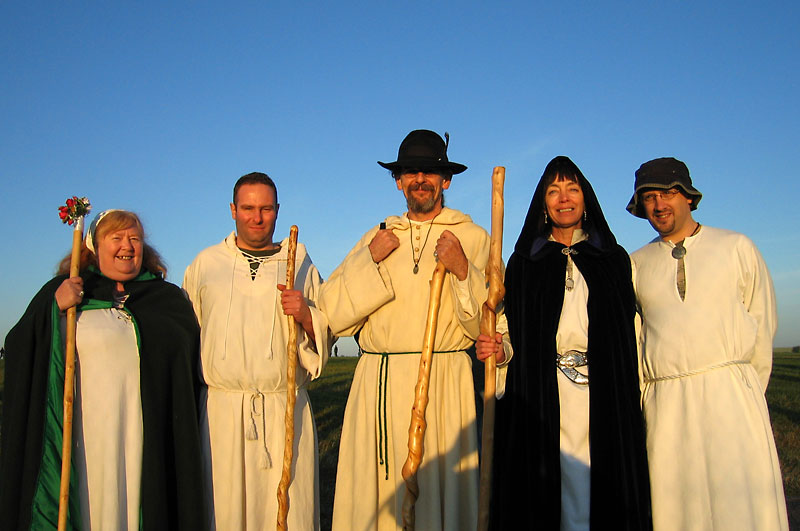
Modern druids at Stonehenge.

At the 2011 census, 75,281 people in England identified as Pagan, doubling since the 2001 census. Paganism in England is dominated by Wicca, founded in England, the modern movement of Druidry, and forms of Heathenry.

Paganism in England
Pagan Religions	2011	2021
Paganism/Modern pagan religions	83,762	95,931
– Pagan	53,172	68,629
– Wicca	11,026	11,952
– Heathen	1,867	4,479
– Druid	3,946	2,269
– Witchcraft	1,193	975
– Shamanism	612	7,623

=== Wicca ===
Wicca was developed in England in the first half of the 20th century. Although it had various terms in the past, from the 1960s the name of the religion was normalised to Wicca.

=== Heathenry ===
Heathenry is a modern revival of Germanic paganism practised in the British Isles by the Anglo-Saxon and Norse peoples prior to Christianisation. In the 2011 Census, 1,867 people identified specifically as 'Heathen', in addition to those who identified more broadly as 'Pagan'. The largest inclusive Heathen organisation that operates in England is Asatru UK. Although lacking official membership statistics, in February 2022 it had 3,177 members of its Facebook group.

=== Druidism ===
In the Iron Age, Celtic polytheism was the predominant religion in the area now known as England. Neo-Druidism grew out of the Celtic revival in 18th-century Romanticism. At the 2011 census, there were 4,189 Druids in England and Wales. A 2012 analysis by the Order of Bards, Ovates and Druids estimates that there are between 6,000 and 11,000 Druids in Britain.

== Other religions ==
Other religions include:

- Spiritualism
- Ravidassia religion
- Rastafari
- Taoism
- Zoroastrianism
- Satanism
- Shinto
- New Age
- Scientology
- Traditional African religion
- Animism
- Druze
- Confucianism
- Thelema
- Vodun
- Eckankar
- Brahma Kumari
- Occult
- Reconstructionism

Other religion	2011	2021
Spiritualism and new religious movements	67,666	78,851
– Spiritualism^{1}	49,361	60,912
– Rastafari	7,657	5,802
– Satanism	1,800	4,751
– Pantheism	2,105	2,158
– Scientology	2,361	1,833
– Animism	487	733
– Universalism	862	721
– Occult	474	457
– New Age	665	373
– Eckankar	367	319
– Brahma Kumaris	434	229
– Thelemite	176	209
– Unification Church	435	195
– Mysticism	192	137
– Church of all Religions	380	22
Indian Religions	31,238	35,485
– Jainism	20,193	24,887
– Ravidassia	11,045	9,564
– Valmiki		1,034
Alevism		25,460
Mixed Religion(s)	21,907	10,981
Iranian Religions	8,801	8,910
– Bahá'í Faith	4,746	4,489
– Zoroastrianism	4,055	4,029
– Yazidism		392
East Asian Religions	5,247	5,287
– Taoism	3,916	3,525
– Shinto	1,041	1,337
– Chinese Religions	174	109
– Confucianism	116	76
Other religions	21,060	71,760
– Theism^{2}	3,618	3,143
– Own Belief System	1,842	2,067
– Deism	1,142	1,036
– Reconstructionism	223	697
– Traditional African religion	584	651
– Druze	504	619
– Vodon	198	246
– Native American Church	119	74
– Other religions	12,830	63,227
Total population	155,919	217,804
^{1} includes people who reported "spiritual"
^{2} includes people who reported "Believe in God"

== Historical religions ==
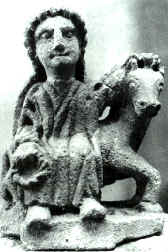
A statue of Epona, a Celtic goddess adopted by the Romans

These faiths, all of which are considered to be pagan, have all been predominant in the regions that later made up England, though were all made extinct through Christianisation.

=== Gallo-Roman religion ===
Gallo-Roman religion formed when the Roman Empire invaded and occupied the Brythonic peoples. Elements of the native Brythonic Celtic religion such as the druids, the Celtic priestly caste who were believed to originate in Britain, were outlawed by Emperor Claudius, and in 61 they vainly defended their sacred groves from destruction by the Romans on the island of Mona (Anglesey).

Under Roman rule the Britons continued to worship native Celtic deities, such as Ancasta, but often conflated them with their Roman equivalents, like Mars Rigonemetos at Nettleham. The founding of a temple to Claudius at Camulodunum was one of the impositions that led to the revolt of Boudica.

Eastern cults such as Mithraism grew in popularity towards the end of Roman occupation. London's Temple of Mithras is one example of the popularity of mystery religions among the rich urban classes.

=== Germanic paganism ===
In the Early Middle Ages, immigrants from the European continent arrived, bringing Anglo-Saxon paganism, a subset of Germanic paganism with them. After most of the Anglo-Saxon peoples had converted to Christianity, Vikings from Scandinavia arrived, bringing with them Norse paganism.

== Notable places of worship ==
The varied religious, denominational, racial, and ethnic history of England has left a wide range of religious buildings—churches, cathedrals, chapels, chapels of ease, synagogues, mosques, gurdwaras, shrines, temples, and kingdom halls. Besides its spiritual importance, the religious architecture includes buildings of importance to the tourism industry and local pride.

As a result of the Reformation, the ancient cathedrals remained in the possession of the then-established churches, while most Roman Catholic churches date from Victorian times or are of more recent construction. In Liverpool the ultra-modern Roman Catholic cathedral was actually completed before the more traditional Anglican cathedral, whose construction took most of the twentieth century. Notable places of worship include, but are not limited to:

- Amaravati Buddhist Monastery – Buddhist
- Bevis Marks Synagogue – Jewish
- Birmingham Central Mosque – Islamic
- Brompton Oratory – Roman Catholic
- Canterbury Cathedral – Church of England
- Finsbury Park Mosque – Islamic
- Gurdwara Sri Guru Singh Sabha – Sikh
- Jamea Masjid – Islamic
- London Buddhist Centre – Buddhist
- London England Temple – Church of Jesus Christ of Latter-day Saints
- Metropolitan Tabernacle – Baptist
- Neasden Temple – Hindu
- Preston England Temple – Church of Jesus Christ of Latter-day Saints
- Salisbury Cathedral – Church of England
- Church of St Lazar – Serbian Orthodox
- St Chad's Cathedral – Roman Catholic
- St Paul's Cathedral – Church of England
- Saint Sophia Cathedral – Greek Orthodox
- Stanmore and Canons Park Synagogue – Jewish
- Victoria Park Mosque – Islamic
- Wat Buddhapadipa – Buddhist
- Westminster Abbey – Church of England
- Westminster Cathedral – Roman Catholic
- Westminster Central Hall – Methodist
- York Minster – Church of England
- Saint Hill Manor – Church of Scientology
- Oldham Central Mosque – Islamic

== Irreligion ==
In 2021, 36.7% of people in England declared no religion, compared with 24.7% in 2011 and 14.6% in 2001. These figures are slightly lower than the combined figures for England and Wales, as Wales has a higher level of irreligion than England. Brighton and Hove had the highest such proportion at 55.2%, followed by Norwich at 53.5%, Bristol and Hastings at 51.4%

Irreligion by Ethnic group and nationality in 2021
Ethnic group	Number	% of ethnic group reported no religion
White	19,156,458	41.84
– British	18,104,217	43.58
– Irish	105,736	21.39
– Roma	17,337	17.59
– Irish Traveller	18,120	28.22
– Other White	911,048	25.41
Asian	481,282	8.87
– Indian	83,109	4.51
– Pakistani	18,149	1.16
– Bangladeshi	9,024	1.43
– Chinese	269,092	62.41
– Other Asian	101,908	10.70
Black	202,935	8.52
– African	52,821	3.60
– Caribbean	115,144	18.59
– Other Black	34,970	11.90
Mixed	726,429	43.51
– White and Black Caribbean	256,376	51.35
– White and Asian	221,505	46.71
– White and Black African	79,263	32.82
– Other Mixed	169,285	37.26
Other	148,562	12.09
– Arab	15,405	4.81
– Other ethnic group	133,157	14.65
TOTAL	20,715,664	36.7

== See also ==
- Religion in Birmingham
- Religion in London
- Religion in the United Kingdom

History:

- Acts of Supremacy
- Disestablishmentarianism
- Dissolution of the Monasteries
- Gunpowder Plot
- History of the Church of England
- Religion in Victorian England
- Putting away of Books and Images Act 1549
- Wembley’s Conference of Living Religions 1924
