= Demographics of Wales =

- Population pyramid of Wales in 2020
- Population: 3,107,500
- Fertility rate: 1.48

Demographics of Wales include population, place of birth, age, ethnicity, religion, and number of marriages in Wales.

== Historical population ==
Population of Wales over time

Historical population
Year	Pop.	±% p.a.
1801	587,128	—
1811	673,337	+1.38%
1821	789,271	+1.60%
1831	904,312	+1.37%
1841	1,045,958	+1.47%
1851	1,163,139	+1.07%
1861	1,286,413	+1.01%
1871	1,412,583	+0.94%
1881	1,604,821	+1.28%
1891	1,788,639	+1.09%
1901	2,012,876	+1.19%
1911	2,420,921	+1.86%
1921	2,656,474	+0.93%
1931	2,593,332	−0.24%
1951	2,596,850	+0.01%
1961	2,644,023	+0.18%
1971	2,731,204	+0.32%
1981	2,790,500	+0.22%
1991	2,811,865	+0.08%
2001	2,910,200	+0.34%
2011	3,063,456	+0.51%
2021	3,107,500	+0.14%

Year	Population
1536	278,000
1620	360,000
1770	500,000
1801	587,000
1851	1,163,000
1911	2,421,000
1921	2,656,000
1939	2,487,000
1961	2,644,023
1991	2,811,865
2011	3,063,456
2021	3,107,500

The population of Wales doubled from 587,000 in 1801 to 1,163,000 in 1851 and had reached 2,421,000 by 1911. Most of the increase came in the coal mining districts, especially Glamorganshire, which grew from 71,000 in 1801 to 232,000 in 1851, and to 1,122,000 in 1911. Part of this increase can be attributed to the demographic transition seen in most industrialising countries during the Industrial Revolution, as death-rates dropped and birth-rates remained steady. However, there was also a large-scale migration of people into Wales during the Industrial Revolution.

== Current population ==
The 2021 census showed Wales' population to be 3,107,500, the highest in its history. In 2011, 27 per cent (837,000) of the total population of Wales were not born in Wales, including 636,000 people (21 per cent of the total population of Wales) who were born in England. The main population and industrial areas are in South Wales, including the cities of Cardiff, Swansea and Newport and the nearby valleys, with another significant population in the north-east around Wrexham and Flintshire.

Population density of Wales in 2011

According to the 2001 census, 96 per cent of the population was White British, and 2.1 per cent non-white (mainly of British Asian origin). Most non-white groups were concentrated in Cardiff, Newport and Swansea. Welsh Asian and African communities developed mainly through immigration after the Second World War. In the early 21st century, parts of Wales saw an increased number of immigrants settle from recent EU accession countries such as Poland, though a 2007 study showed a relatively low number of employed immigrant workers from the former Eastern Bloc countries in Wales compared to other regions of the United Kingdom.

The 2001 UK census was criticised in Wales for not offering Welsh as an option to describe respondents' national identity. Partly to address this concern, the 2011 census asked the question "How would you describe your national identity?". Respondents were instructed to "tick all that apply" from a list of options that included Welsh. The outcome was that 57.5 per cent of Wales' population indicated their sole national identity to be Welsh; a further 7.1 per cent indicated it to be both Welsh and British. No Welsh national identity was indicated by 34.1 per cent. The proportion giving their sole national identity as British was 16.9 per cent, and another 9.4 per cent included British with another national identity. No British national identity was indicated by 73.7 per cent. 11.2 per cent indicated their sole national identity as English and another 2.6 per cent included English with another national identity.

The 2011 census showed Wales to be less ethnically diverse than any region of 'England and Wales': 93.2 per cent classed themselves as White British (including Welsh, English, Scottish or Northern Irish), 2.4 per cent as Other White (including Irish), 2.2 per cent as Asian (including Asian British), 1 per cent as Mixed, and 0.6 per cent as Black (African, Caribbean, or Black British). The lowest proportion of White British (80.3 per cent) was in Cardiff.

In 2001, a quarter of the Welsh population were born outside Wales, mainly in England; about 3 per cent were born outside the UK. The proportion born in Wales varies across the country, with the highest percentages in the South Wales valleys and the lowest in Mid Wales and parts of the north-east. In both Blaenau Gwent and Merthyr Tydfil, 92 per cent were Welsh-born, compared with only 51 per cent and 56 per cent in the border counties of Flintshire and Powys. Just over 1.75 million Americans report themselves to have Welsh ancestry, as did 440,965 Canadians in Canada's 2006 census.

The total fertility rate (TFR) in Wales was 1.90 in 2011, which is below the replacement rate of 2.1. The majority of births are to unmarried women (58 per cent of births in 2011 were outside marriage). About one in 10 births (10.7 per cent) in 2011 were to foreign-born mothers, compared to 5.2 per cent in 2001.

Largest cities or towns in Wales Office for National Statistics 2011 Census
Rank	Name	Council area	Pop.	Rank	Name	Council area	Pop.
1	Cardiff	City & County of Cardiff	335,145	11	Caerphilly	Caerphilly County Borough	41,402
2	Swansea	City & County of Swansea	239,000	12	Port Talbot	Neath Port Talbot	37,276
3	Newport	Newport City	128,060	13	Pontypridd	Rhondda Cynon Taf	30,457
4	Wrexham	Wrexham County Borough	61,603	14	Aberdare	Rhondda Cynon Taf	29,748
5	Barry	Vale of Glamorgan	54,673	15	Colwyn Bay	Conwy County Borough	29,405
6	Neath	Neath Port Talbot	50,658	16	Pontypool	Torfaen	28,334
7	Cwmbran	Torfaen	46,915	17	Penarth	Vale of Glamorgan	27,226
8	Bridgend	Bridgend County Borough	46,757	18	Rhyl	Denbighshire	25,149
9	Llanelli	Carmarthenshire	43,878	19	Blackwood	Caerphilly County Borough	24,042
10	Merthyr Tydfil	Merthyr Tydfil	43,820	20	Maesteg	Bridgend County Borough	18,888

Population growth between 2011 and 2021 Less than -3% -0 - 3% +0 - 5% +5 - 10% More than +10%

== Vital statistics ==
	Average population	Live births	Deaths	Natural change	Crude birth rate (per 1000)	Crude death rate (per 1000)	Natural change (per 1000)	Fertility rates
1929		44,595						
1930		43,941						
1931		42,330						
1932		40,873						
1933		39,424						
1934		39,956						
1935		39,187						
1936		37,909						
1937		37,175						
1938		37,625						
1939		37,402						
1940		39,319	35,585	3,734	13.9	12.6	1.3	1.84
1941		39,886	35,837	4,049	13.7	12.3	1.4	1.82
1942		43,130	31,360	11,770	15.4	11.2	4.2	2.03
1943		43,270	31,496	11,774	16.0	11.6	4.4	2.11
1944		46,730	30,987	15,743	17.5	11.6	5.9	2.33
1945		41,515	31,892	9,623	15.7	12.1	3.6	2.12
1946		47,566	31,547	16,019	19.0	12.3	6.7	2.55
1947		51,163	33,291	17,872	20.4	13.3	7.1	2.75
1948		47,175	30,095	17,080	17.7	11.3	6.4	2.46
1949		44,337	32,109	12,228	16.6	12.0	4.6	2.35
1950		42,776	33,295	9,481	15.4	12.9	2.5	2.26
1951		41,270	36,005	5,265	15.2	13.3	1.9	2.21
1952		41,388	31,005	10,383	15.1	11.3	3.8	2.23
1953		41,528	31,392	10,136	15.3	12.4	2.9	2.31
1954		40,256	32,822	7,704	15.0	12.3	2.7	2.28
1955		38,876	33,938	4,938	14.8	12.7	2.1	2.25
1956		40,915	32,438	8,477	15.5	12.0	3.5	2.41
1957		41,645	32,696	8,949	15.9	12.3	3.6	2.43
1958		42,460	32,642	9,818	16.2	12.2	4.0	2.50
1959		42,262	32,134	10,128	16.3	12.1	4.2	2.56
1960		44,147	32,715	11,432	17.0	12.3	4.7	2.68
1961		44,923	33,705	11,218	17.4	12.9	4.5	2.75
1962		45,382	33,781	11,601	17.8	13.0	4.8	2.83
1963		47,038	34,763	12,275	18.0	13.2	4.8	2.95
1964		47,502	32,746	14,756	18.3	12.3	6.0	2.99
1965		46,292	33,062	13,230	17.9	12.4	5.5	2.91
1966		44,866	34,643	10,223	17.5	12.8	4.7	2.81
1967		43,706	33,160	10,546	17.0	12.2	4.8	2.73
1968		44,207	34,892	9,315	16.7	12.9	3.8	2.62
1969		43,082	35,953	7,129	16.2	13.5	2.7	2.53
1970		42,487	34,998	7,489	15.8	12.8	3.0	2.47
1971	2,740,000	43,056	34,817	8,239	15.7	12.5	3.0	2.45
1972	2,755,000	39,955	36,000	3,955	14.5	13.1	1.4	2.24
1973	2,772,000	37,597	35,826	1,771	13.6	12.9	0.7	2.08
1974	2,785,000	36,206	35,634	572	13.0	12.8	0.2	1.97
1975	2,795,000	33,972	35,610	-1,638	12.2	12.7	-0.5	1.87
1976	2,799,000	33,738	36,345	-2,607	11.9	13.0	-1.1	1.79
1977	2,800,000	31,765	35,205	-3,440	11.3	12.6	-1.3	1.72
1978	2,804,000	33,308	35,963	-2,665	11.9	12.8	-0.9	1.79
1979	2,810,000	36,174	36,087	87	12.9	12.8	0.1	1.91
1980	2,815,000	37,357	35,149	2,208	13.3	12.5	0.8	1.95
1981	2,813,000	35,842	35,015	827	12.7	12.4	0.3	1.87
1982	2,804,000	35,720	35,152	568	12.7	12.5	0.2	1.86
1983	2,803,000	35,494	35,242	252	12.7	12.6	0.1	1.83
1984	2,800,000	35,861	33,652	2,209	12.8	12.0	0.8	1.83
1985	2,803,000	36,771	35,536	1,235	13.1	12.7	0.4	1.86
1986	2,811,000	37,038	34,712	2,326	13.2	12.3	0.9	1.86
1987	2,822,000	37,816	33,919	3,897	13.4	12.0	1.4	1.88
1988	2,841,000	38,824	33,981	4,842	13.7	12.0	1.7	1.91
1989	2,855,000	38,019	35,134	2,885	13.3	12.3	1.0	1.86
1990	2,861,000	38,866	33,963	4,903	13.6	11.9	1.7	1.91
1991	2,873,000	38,079	34,136	3,943	13.3	11.9	1.4	1.88
1992	2,877,000	37,523	33,792	3,731	13.0	11.7	1.3	1.87
1993	2,883,000	36,578	35,826	752	12.7	12.4	0.3	1.84
1994	2,887,000	35,366	33,824	1,542	12.2	11.7	0.5	1.79
1995	2,888,000	34,477	35,306	-829	11.9	12.2	-0.3	1.77
1996	2,891,000	34,894	34,802	92	12.1	12.0	0.1	1.81
1997	2,895,000	34,520	34,886	-366	11.9	12.1	-0.2	1.81
1998	2,899,000	33,438	33,905	-467	11.5	11.7	-0.2	1.78
1999	2,900,000	32,111	34,929	-2,818	11.1	12.0	-0.9	1.72
2000	2,907,000	31,304	33,501	-2,197	10.8	11.5	-0.7	1.68
2001	2,910,000	30,616	33,249	-2,633	10.5	11.4	-0.9	1.66
2002	2,923,000	30,205	33,314	-3,108	10.3	11.4	-1.1	1.64
2003	2,937,000	31,400	33,810	-2,410	10.7	11.5	-0.8	1.71
2004	2,957,000	32,325	32,317	8	10.9	10.9	0.0	1.76
2005	2,969,000	32,593	32,162	431	11.0	10.8	0.2	1.78
2006	2,985,000	33,628	31,083	2,545	11.3	10.4	1.1	1.82
2007	3,006,000	34,414	32,148	2,266	11.4	10.7	0.7	1.86
2008	3,026,000	35,650	32,066	3,584	11.8	10.6	1.2	1.91
2009	3,039,000	34,937	31,066	3,871	11.5	10.2	1.3	1.87
2010	3,050,000	35,952	31,197	4,755	11.8	10.2	1.6	1.92
2011	3,063,000	35,598	30,426	5,172	11.6	9.9	1.7	1.90
2012	3,074,000	35,238	31,502	3,736	11.5	10.2	1.3	1.88
2013	3,082,000	33,747	32,138	1,609	10.9	10.4	0.5	1.80
2014	3,092,000	33,544	31,439	2,105	10.8	10.2	0.6	1.78
2015	3,099,000	33,279	33,198	81	10.7	10.7	0.0	1.77
2016	3,113,000	32,936	33,047	–111	10.6	10.6	–0.0	1.74
2017	3,125,000	32,176	33,248	−1,072	10.4	10.6	−0.2	1.69
2018	3,139,000	31,274	34,406	–3,132	10.0	11.0	–1.0	1.63
2019	3,153,000	29,704	32,900	-3,196	9.4	10.4	-1.0	1.54
2020	3,170,000	28,638	37,399	-8,761	9.0	11.8	-2.8	1.47
2021(c)	3,107,500	28,781	36,141	-7,360	9.3	11.6	-2.3	1.51
2022	3,134,200	28,296	35,688	-7,392	9.1	11.4	-2.3	1.46
2023	3,167,300	27,374	36,041	-8,667	8.7	11.4	-2.7	1.39
2024	3,178,000	26,832	35,405	-8,573	8.4	11.1	-2.7	1.35
2025	3,175,200	26,282	35,767	-9,485	8.2	11.2	-3.0	1.33

(c) = Census results.

=== Current vital statistics ===
Period	Live births	Deaths	Natural increase
January—June 2025	13,080	18,820	–5,740
January—June 2026	12,830	17,645	–4,815
Difference	▼ –250 (–1.91%)	▼ –1,175 (–6.24%)	▲ +925

== Place of birth ==
According to the 2011 census 2.2 million (73%) of the usual residents were born in Wales, a reduction of two percent since 2001. In 2001, 590,000 (20%) of the population of Wales was born in England. By 2011, the proportion of English-born citizens of Wales had increased by one percent to 21%. In 2011, 27% (837,000) of the total population of Wales were born outside Wales, and of these immigrants 636,000 (76%) were born in England.

Country of birth	1991		2001		2011		2021	
Country of birth	Number	%	Number	%	Number	%	Number	%
United Kingdom	2,758,057	97.28%	2,811,594	96.85%	2,895,585	94.52%	2,892,065	93.07%
Wales	2,187,699	77.17%	2,188,754	75.39%	2,226,005	72.66%	2,202,820	70.89%
England	539,700	19.04%	589,828	20.32%	636,266	20.77%	659,084	21.21%
Scotland	23,117	0.82%	24,389	0.84%	24,346	0.79%	21,975	0.71%
Northern Ireland	7,388	0.26%	7,851	0.27%	8,253	0.27%	7,803	0.25%
UK not otherwise specified	153	0.01%	772	0.03%	434	0.01%	288	0.01%
European Union (EU) Member countries	–	–	35,783	1.23%	67,535	2.20%	91,472	2.94%
(Republic of Ireland) Ireland	13,442	0.47%	12,740	0.44%	12,175	0.40%	9,998	0.32%
Other EU Member Countries (joined pre-2001)	–	–			26,343	1.81%	31,590	1.02%
Poland	2,066	0.07%	1,428	0.05%	18,023	0.59%	24,832	0.80%
Other EU Member Countries (joined post-2001)	–	–			29,017	0.95%	24,792	0.80%
Non-UK/EU Countries			55,708	1.92%	100,336	3.28%	123,962	3.99%
Total	2,835,073	100.00%	2,903,085	100.00%	3,063,456	100.00%	3,107,499	100.00%

Map showing the percentage of the population born in England according to the 2011 census.

Below are the 5 largest foreign-born groups in Wales according to 2014 ONS estimates.

Country of birth	Estimated population		
Country of birth	2013	2014	2015
Poland	20,000	22,000	23,000
Republic of Ireland	11,000	12,000	10,000
India	10,000	12,000	13,000
Germany	11,000	11,000	11,000
South Africa	7,000	6,000	6,000

Population pyramid from 2001 to 2020

== Age ==
Population pyramid in 2020

According to the 2011 census, some 563,000 of the population were aged 65 and over, an increase of 56,700 or one percent since 2001. As in 2001, six per cent (178,000) of the population in Wales were children under five, an increase of 11,300.

Ages attained (years)	Population	% of total
0–4	178,301	5.82
5–9	163,079	5.32
10–14	177,748	5.80
15–19	199,120	6.50
20–24	211,924	6.92
25–29	185,728	6.06
30–34	174,694	5.70
35–39	183,045	5.98
40–44	213,155	6.96
45–49	213,155	7.20
50–54	201,599	6.58
55–59	186,923	6.10
60–64	204,885	6.69
65–69	166,007	5.42
70–74	134,543	4.39
75–79	108,202	3.53
80–84	79,232	2.59
85–89	49,360	1.61
90+	25,200	0.82

Source: 2011 Census: Usual resident population by five-year age group and sex, local authorities in the United Kingdom, Accessed 23 December 2012

== National identity ==
=== 2011 ===
A question on national identity was asked in the 2011 census: "What do you feel is your national identity?" Respondents could identify themselves as having one or more national identity.

An analysis of the 2011 data by Manchester University's Centre on Dynamics of Ethnicity revealed that:

- 58% identified as "Welsh only"
- 16% identified as "British only"
- 12% identified as "English only"
- 7% identified as "Welsh and British"

The remainder chose other national identities. The Welsh-Caribbean population were the most likely to respond as "Welsh Only", at 59% of 11,099 citizens.

=== 2018 ===
A 2018 poll, commissioned by the BBC and carried out by YouGov, found that almost eight in 10 (79%) people in Wales identified strongly as British; while six in 10 (62%) identified strongly as Welsh.

=== 2020 ===
A 2020 YouGov poll asking a sample of 1110 people "Which, if any, of the following best describes the way you think of yourself?" found the following responses:

- 21% "Welsh not British"
- 17% "More Welsh than British"
- 22% "Equally Welsh and British"
- 9% "More British than Welsh"
- 17% "British not Welsh"
- 11% "Other"
- 3% "Don't know"

==== Summary ====
Total Welsh at all: 69%

Total at least more Welsh than British: 38%

Total at least more British than Welsh: 26%

== Ethnicity ==
Ethnic demography of Wales from 1981–2011

Ethnic makeup of Wales in single year age groups in 2021

Population pyramid of Wales by ethnicity in 2021

According to the 2011 census, 2.2 million (73%) of usual residents of Wales were born there, two percent less than in 2001. The change can be attributed to both international and internal migration. In 2001, 590,000 (20%) of the population of Wales was born in England. In 2011, this had increased by one percent. Nearly 418,000 people identified themselves as Welsh in 2001. The 1991, 2001 and 2011 census estimated the following ethnic groups:

Ethnic demography of Wales
Ethnic group	Year											
Ethnic group	1971 estimations		1981 estimations		1991		2001		2011		2021	
Ethnic group	Population	%	Population	%	Population	%	Population	%	Population	%	Population	%
White: Total	–	99.6%	2,788,533	99.1%	2,793,522	98.5%	2,841,505	97.9%	2,928,253	95.6%	2,915,848	93.7%
White: British	–	–	–	–	–	–	2,786,605	96.0%	2,855,450	93.2%	2,814,427	90.4%
White: Irish	–	–	–	–	20,841	0.7%	17,689	0.6%	14,086	0.5%	13,214	0.4%
White: Irish Traveller/White Gypsy (Note: New category created for the 2011 census)	–	–	–	–	–	–	–	–	2,785	0.1%	3,550	0.1%
White: Roma	–	–	–	–	–	–	–	–	–	–	1,843	0.1%
White: Other	–	–	–	–	–	–	37,211	1.3%	55,932	1.8%	82,994	2.7%
Asian or Asian British: Total	–	–	–	–	24,399	0.9%	31,715	1.1%	70,128	2.3%	89,028	3.0%
Asian or Asian British: Indian	–	–	–	–	6,384	0.2%	8,261	0.3%	17,256	0.6%	21,070	0.7%
Asian or Asian British: Pakistani	–	–	–	–	5,717	0.2%	8,287	0.3%	12,229	0.4%	17,534	0.6%
Asian or Asian British: Bangladeshi	–	–	–	–	3,820	0.1%	5,436	0.2%	10,687	0.3%	15,314	0.5%
Asian or Asian British: Chinese (Note: In 2001, listed under the 'Chinese or other ethnic group' heading.)	–	–	–	–	4,801	0.2%	6,267	0.2%	13,638	0.4%	14,454	0.5%
Asian or Asian British: Asian Other	–	–	–	–	3,677	0.1%	3,464	0.1%	16,318	0.5%	20,656	0.7%
Black or Black British: Total	–	–	–	–	9,492	0.3%	7,069	0.2%	18,276	0.6%	27,554	0.8%
Black or Black British: African	–	–	–	–	2,671	0.1%	3,727	0.1%	11,887	0.4%	19,907	0.6%
Black or Black British: Caribbean	–	–	–	–	3,348	0.1%	2,597	0.1%	3,809	0.1%	3,700	0.1%
Black or Black British: Other	–	–	–	–	3,473	0.1%	745	<0.1%	2,580	0.1%	3,947	0.1%
British Mixed: Total	–	–	–	–	–	–	17,661	0.7%	31,521	1.0%	48,598	1.6%
Mixed: White and Caribbean	–	–	–	–	–	–	5,996	0.2%	11,099	0.4%	13,732	0.4%
Mixed: White and African	–	–	–	–	–	–	2,413	0.1%	4,424	0.1%	8,068	0.3%
Mixed: White and Asian	–	–	–	–	–	–	5,001	0.2%	9,019	0.3%	14,035	0.5%
Mixed: Other Mixed	–	–	–	–	–	–	4,251	0.2%	6,979	0.2%	12,763	0.4%
Other: Total	–	–	–	–	7,660	0.3%	5,135	0.2%	15,278	0.5%	26,466	0.9%
Other: Arab (Note: New category created for the 2011 census)	–	–	–	–	–	–	–	–	9,615	0.3%	11,641	0.4%
Other: Any other ethnic group	–	–	–	–	7,660	0.3%	5,135	0.2%	5,663	0.2%	14,825	0.5%
Ethnic minority: Total	–	0.4%	24,467	0.9%	41,551	1.5%	61,580	2.1%	135,203	4.4%	191,646	5.8%
Total:	–	100%	2,813,000	100%	2,835,073	100%	2,903,085	100%	3,063,456	100%	3,107,494	100%

Notes for table above

Source: Census 2001 Key Statistics - Urban area summary results for local authorities KS06 Ethnic group, Retrieved 18 June 2013
Source: Census 2011: Ethnic group, unitary authorities in Wales, Accessed 23 December 2012

=== Ethnicity of school pupils ===
White British school children in Wales

Ethnicity of school pupils within Wales
Ethnic group	School year					
Ethnic group	2008		2016		2022	
Ethnic group	Population	%	Population	%	Population	%
White: Total	383,820	93.8%	362,290	92.2	365,231	90.3%
White: British	376,870	92.1%	351,145	89.4%	350,842	86.7%
White: Irish Traveller/White Gypsy	585		996		1,183	0.3%
White: Other	6365		10,149		13,206	3.3%
Asian or Asian British: Total	7,845	1.9%	9,905	2.5%	10,520	2.6%
Asian or Asian British: Indian	1345		2,056		2,641	0.7%
Asian or Asian British: Pakistani	2225		3,009		3,285	0.8%
Asian or Asian British: Bangladeshi	2300		3,188		3,304	0.8%
Asian or Asian British: Chinese	865		720		939	0.2%
Asian or Asian British: Asian Other	1110		932		1,290	0.3%
Black or Black British: Total	2,140	0.5%	3,355	0.9%	4,446	1.1%
Black or Black British: Caribbean	200		194		198	–
Black or Black British: African	1595		2,743		3,711	0.9%
Black or Black British: Other	345		418		537	0.1%
British Mixed: Total	6,715	1.6%	10,592	2.7%	14,775	3.7%
Mixed: White and Caribbean	1750		2,314		2,754	0.7%
Mixed: White and African	730		1,398		2,198	0.5%
Mixed: White and Asian	1605		2,351		3,011	0.7%
Mixed: Other Mixed	2630		4,529		6,812	1.7%
Other: Total	2530	0.6%	4,639	1.2%	6,059	1.5%
Other: Any other ethnic group	2530	0.6%			6,059	1.5%
Unknown or not stated	6245	1.5%	2,081	0.5%	2,511	0.6%
Total:	409,295	100%	392,862	100%	404,481	100%

== Religion ==
Religion	2001		2011		2021	
Religion	Number	%	Number	%	Number	%
No religion	537,935	18.5	982,997	32.1	1,446,398	46.5
Christianity	2,087,242	71.9	1,763,299	57.6	1,354,773	43.6
Islam	21,739	0.7	45,950	1.5	66,947	2.2
Hinduism	5,439	0.2	10,434	0.3	12,242	0.4
Buddhism	5,407	0.2	9,117	0.3	10,075	0.3
Sikhism	2,015	0.1	2,962	0.1	4,048	0.1
Judaism	2,256	0.1	2,064	0.1	2,044	0.1
Other religion	6,909	0.2	12,705	0.4	15,926	0.5
Religion not stated	234,143	8.1	233,928	7.6	195,041	6.3
Total population	2,903,085	100.0	3,063,456	100.0	3,107,494	100.0

- There are no solid statistics covering Christian denominations in Wales. However it is clear that the Presbyterian Church of Wales, a Nonconformist denomination, and the Church in Wales, part of the Anglican Church, have historically been the largest. Important to Wales have been Nonconformist denominations, which became widespread in the 18th century, and Roman Catholicism until the 16th century. The translation of the Bible into Welsh by William Morgan in 1588 not only helped the survival of the Welsh language (after the Laws in Wales Acts effectively outlawed it in public life) but also enabled a faster uptake of Protestantism.
- A Jewish community has existed in Wales since the 13th century or earlier, but there are now only about 2,000 Jews left (since peaking at around 5,000 in 1913), and most live in the Cardiff area. There used to be enough Jews to sustain synagogues in valley communities like Merthyr Tydfil and Tredegar, but there are now only three active synagogues in the whole country.
- Wales before Christianity had a Celtic religion. Wales retained Celtic aspects in the church during the Middle Ages.

== Language ==
The proportion of respondents in the 2011 census who said they could speak Welsh.

The 2011 census collected information about English and Welsh language proficiency. In 2011, 2.9 million (97%) of residents age three and over spoke English or Welsh. In a further 18,000 households, at least one adult spoke English or Welsh. In 22,000 households, no resident spoke either language. There were 562,000 (19%) residents over age three proficient in at least speaking the Welsh language. This was a reduction of approximately two per cent compared to 2001, though the method of analysis differed between the two censuses. There was also a two per cent increase in those over three years of age who had no Welsh language skills. Similar trend continued in the 2010s, and by the 2021 census proficient in at least speaking Welsh has decreased to about 538,300, about 17.8% of the total number of residents aged three or over.

Welsh language skills	2001		2011		2021	
Welsh language skills	Number	%	Number	%	Number	%
No skills in Welsh	2,007,984	71.6	2,167,987	73.3	2,259,018	74.8
Can speak, read and write Welsh	457,946	16.3	430,717	14.6	429,310	14.2
Can understand spoken Welsh only	138,416	4.9	157,792	5.3	156,763	5.2
Can speak but cannot read or write Welsh	79,310	2.8	80,429	2.7	68,387	2.3
Other combination of skills in Welsh	83,661	3.0	73,392	2.5	70,721	2.3
Can speak and read but cannot write Welsh	38,384	1.4	45,524	1.5	33,970	1.1
Total	2,805,701		2,955,841		3,018,169	

Welsh language skills	1991		2001		2011		2021	
Welsh language skills	Number	%	Number	%	Number	%	Number	%
Can speak	508,098	18.66	582,368	20.76	562,016	19.01	538,287	17.83
Can read	444,575	16.32					522,411	17.31
Can write	384,605	14.12					458,462	15.19
Any skills above	546,551	20.07	659,301	23.50	630,062	21.32	602,388	19.96
Any skills (includes listening)			797,717	28.43	787,854	26.65	759,151	25.15
All skills above	369,609	13.57	457,946	16.32	430,717	14.57	429,310	14.22
Total	2,723,623		2,805,701		2,955,841		3,018,169	

The most common main languages spoken in Wales according to the 2011 census are shown below.

Language	Usual residents aged 3+	Proportion
English or Welsh	2,871,405	97.14%
Polish	17,001	0.58%
Arabic	6,800	0.23%
Bengali (with Sylheti and Chatgaya)	5,207	0.18%
Tagalog/Filipino	2,749	0.09%
Portuguese	2,451	0.08%
Urdu	2,350	0.08%
French	2,073	0.07%
German	2,050	0.07%
Italian	1,694	0.06%
Other	42,061	1.42%

== Marriage and civil partnership ==
In 2011, those who were married were still the largest marriage or civil partnership status group in Wales for residents aged 16 and over, though since 2001 this group has decreased by 37,000 (over 5%). In contrast, single people (i.e. those who have never married or been part of a same sex partnership), have increased by 190,000 (6%) in the ten-year period. Civil partnerships, which were given legal status in 2005, appear for the first time in the census results. The number of widows, widowers and surviving partners is 20,000 lower than in 2001. The final groups, relating to separation and divorce or legal dissolution of civil partnerships, have both seen an increase in both numerical and relative terms since 2001.

Status	2001		2011	
Status	Thousands	%	Thousands	%
Married	1,204	52.0	1,167	46.6
Single	650	28.1	840	33.5
Divorced or legally dissolved	201	8.7	242	9.7
Widowed or surviving partner	218	9.4	198	7.9
Separated	44	1.9	55	2.2
Civil partnership	n/a	n/a	5	0.2

Table key

- Single = Single never married or registered a same-sex civil partnership)
- Divorced or legally dissolved = divorced or formerly in a same-sex civil partnership which is now legally dissolved
- Widowed or surviving partner = Widowed or surviving partner from a same-sex civil partnership
- Separated = Separated (but still legally married or still legally in a same-sex civil partnership)
- Civil partnership = In a registered same-sex civil partnership

Source: 2011 Census: KS103EW Marital and civil partnership status, unitary authorities in Wales, Accessed 23 December 2012

== Military staff and veterans ==
Out of all the armed services, the Army has the largest presence in Wales, with over 1,400 personnel based there. As of 2019, there were 3,230 military and civilian personnel based in Wales.

In the 2021 census, around 115,000 people in Wales reported that they had previously served in the armed forces, around 4.5% of usual residents in Wales aged 16 years or older.

== Miscellaneous data ==
- Population density (2006): 143 people per square kilometre
- Fertility rate: 1.90 (2007)
- In 2010, 58% of births were outside marriage in Wales. Currently, Wales and Scotland are the only countries of the United Kingdom where the majority of births are outside of marriage (51.3% of births in Scotland in 2012 were outside of marriage). Wales (along with Scotland) also had the highest death rate (10.9 per thousand) in 2005.

== See also ==
- Demographics of the United Kingdom
- Demographics of England
- Demographics of Scotland
- Demographics of Northern Ireland
