= Demographics of the Victorian era =

Demographics of the Victorian era refers to the demographics of the United Kingdom during the reign of Queen Victoria.

== Demographic transition ==
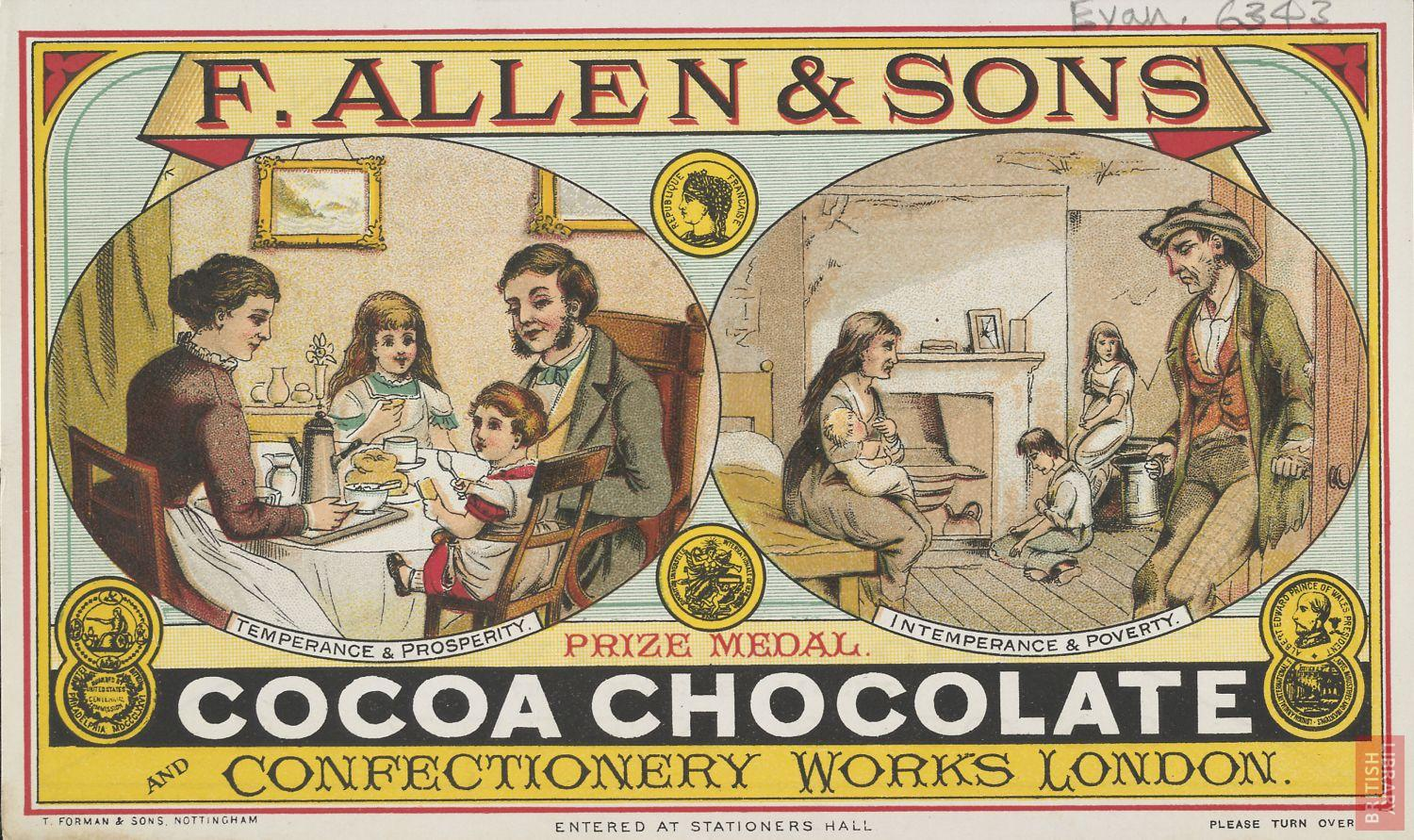
1880 London magazine ad links prosperity to temperance.

Britain had the lead in rapid economic and population growth. At the time, Thomas Malthus believed this lack of growth outside Britain was due to the carrying capacity of their local environments. That is, the tendency of a population to expand geometrically while resources grew more slowly, reaching a crisis (such as famine, war, or epidemic) which would reduce the population to a more sustainable size. Great Britain escaped the 'Malthusian trap' because the scientific and technological breakthroughs of the Industrial Revolution dramatically improved living standards, reducing mortality and increasing longevity.

The Victorian era was a time of unprecedented population growth in Britain. The population rose from 13.9 million in 1831 to 32.5 million in 1901. Two major contributory factors were fertility rates and mortality rates. Britain was the first country to undergo the demographic transition and the Agricultural and Industrial Revolutions. The population of England and Wales almost doubled from 16.8 million in 1851 to 30.5 million in 1901, and Scotland's population also rose rapidly, from 2.8 million in 1851 to 4.4 million in 1901. However, Ireland's population decreased sharply, from 8.2 million in 1841 to less than 4.5 million in 1901, mostly due to emigration and the Great Famine.

Economist Gary Becker argued that at first, falling fertility is due to urbanisation and lower infant mortality rates, which diminished the benefits and increased the costs of raising children. In other words, it became more economically sensible to invest more in fewer children. This is known as the first demographic transition. This trend continued till around 1950. (The second demographic transition occurred due to the significant cultural shifts of the 1960s, leading to the decline in the desire for children.)

== Mortality rates ==
There was no catastrophic epidemic or famine in England or Scotland in the nineteenth century—it was the first century in which a major epidemic did not occur throughout the whole country, and deaths per 1000 of population per year in England and Wales fell from 21.9 from 1848 to 1854 to 17 in 1901 (cf, for instance, 5.4 in 1971). Social class had a significant effect on mortality rates: the upper classes had a lower rate of premature death early in the nineteenth century than poorer classes did.

In the Victorian era, fertility rates increased in every decade until 1901, when the rates started evening out. There were several reasons for this. One is biological: with improving living standards, a higher proportion of women were biologically able to have children. Another possible explanation is social. In the 19th century, the marriage rate increased, and people were getting married at a very young age until the end of the century, when the average age of marriage started to increase again slowly. The reasons why people got married younger and more frequently are uncertain. One theory is that greater prosperity allowed people to finance marriage and new households earlier than previously possible. With more births within marriage, it seems inevitable that marriage rates and birth rates would rise together.

Birth rates were originally measured by the 'crude birth rate' – births per year divided by total population. This is indeed a crude measure, as key groups and their fertility rates are not clear. It is likely to be affected mainly by changes in the age distribution of the population. The Net Reproduction Rate was then introduced as an alternative measure: it measures the average fertility rate of women of child-bearing ages.

High rates of birth also occurred because of a lack of birth control. Mainly because women lacked knowledge of birth control methods and the practice was seen as unrespectable. The evening out of fertility rates at the beginning of the 20th century was mainly the result of a few big changes: availability of forms of birth control, and changes in people's attitude towards sex.

Environmental and health standards rose throughout the Victorian era. Improvements in nutrition may also have played a role, though its importance is still debated.

== See also ==
- History of public health in the United Kingdom
