= Mixed White and Asian (United Kingdom ethnicity category) =

Total population
- 488,225

Languages
- British English

Religion
- Mostly Irreligious, Significant minority of Christianity and of Islam

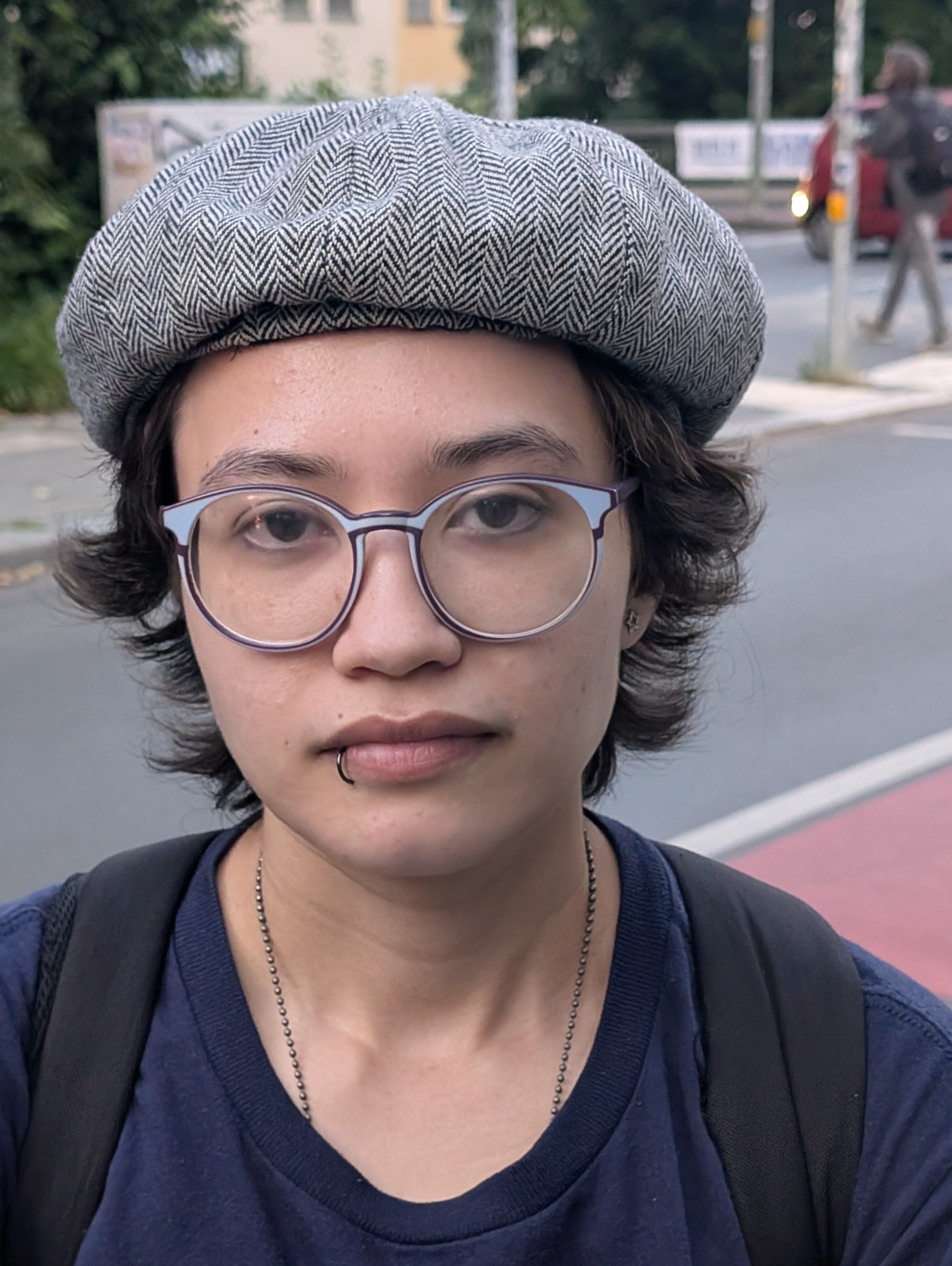
A person with both German and Filipino roots

Mixed White and Asian is an ethnic group category that was first introduced by the United Kingdom's Office for National Statistics for the 2001 Census. Colloquially it refers to British citizens or residents whose parents are of a White (unspecified) ethnic background and Asian (unspecified) ethnic background. This classification is only used in England and Wales, as Scotland and Northern Ireland do not have sub categories for their mixed group options.

They have a total population of 488,225 representing 0.8% of England and Wales, an increase from 341,727 in 2011 and 189,015 in 2001.

== Demographics ==
Mixed White and Asian population pyramid in 2021

The White and Asian Mixed population has increased with each decennial census, starting from 189,015 people with the category's introduction in 2001, rising to 341,727 in 2011 to now 488,225 in 2021 in England and Wales.

=== Religion ===
Religion	England and Wales			
Religion	2011		2021	
Religion	Number	%	Number	%
Christianity	120,158	35.16%	133,944	27.43%
No religion	114,497	33.51%	228,521	46.81%
Islam	49,689	14.54%	56,265	11.52%
Judaism	1,235	0.36%	1,204	0.25%
Buddhism	5,789	1.69%	6,667	1.37%
Hinduism	6,406	1.87%	8,023	1.64%
Sikhism	3,838	1.12%	5,610	1.15%
Other religions	2,149	0.63%	5,036	1.03%
Not Stated	37,966	11.11%	42,955	8.80%

== See also ==
- Mixed (United Kingdom ethnicity category)
- Mixed White and Black African people in the United Kingdom
- Mixed White and Black Caribbean (United Kingdom ethnicity category)
