= Peter J. Aspinall =

British social scientist

Peter J. Aspinall is a social scientist whose research focuses on health services, the terminology and classification of ethnicity, and the relationship between ethnicity and health.

== Career ==
He is Emeritus Reader in Population Health at the Centre for Health Services Studies at the University of Kent. Aspinall is an Honorary Special Advisor to the London Health Observatory, now part of Public Health England, and advises the Office for National Statistics on the cultural questions included in the United Kingdom Census. He acts as a director and trustee of the charity People in Harmony, with focuses on the experience of mixed-race people in the UK, and was an academic consultant for the series of BBC programmes, Mixed Britannia.

Aspinall joined the South East Institute of Public Health at Guy's, King's and St Thomas' School of Medicine, University of London, in 1992, and transferred to the University of Kent when the South East Institute moved to the Centre for Health Services Studies in 2000. Prior to 1992, he had worked at the University of Birmingham and then in research and management roles in regional and district health authorities.
