= Mixed White and Black Caribbean (United Kingdom ethnicity category) =

Mixed White & Black Caribbean
Total population
- 513,042 (in England and Wales)

Regions with significant populations
- England predominantly, small amounts in Wales

Languages
- British English

Religion
- Mostly irreligious. Significant minority of Christianity and small minority of Islam

Mixed White and Black Caribbean is an ethnic group category that was first introduced by the United Kingdom's Office for National Statistics for the 2001 Census. Colloquially it refers to British citizens or residents whose parents are of a White ethnic background and Black Caribbean ethnic background. This classification is only used in England and Wales, as Scotland and Northern Ireland do not have sub categories for their mixed group options.

They have a total population of 513,042, representing 0.9% of England and Wales, an increase from 426,715 in 2011 and 237,420 in 2001.

== Demographics ==
The White and Black Caribbean Mixed population has increased with each decennial census, starting from 237,420 people with the category's introduction in 2001, rising to 426,715 in 2011 to now 513,042 in 2021 in England and Wales.

Mixed White and Black Caribbean population pyramid in 2021

=== Religion ===
Religion	England and Wales			
Religion	2011		2021	
Religion	Number	%	Number	%
Christianity	217,615	51.00%	195,964	38.20%
No religion	159,785	37.45%	264,228	51.50%
Islam	5,384	1.26%	5,527	1.08%
Judaism	784	0.18%	786	0.15%
Buddhism	1,011	0.24%	1,168	0.23%
Hinduism	390	0.09%	214	0.04%
Sikhism	272	0.06%	105	0.02%
Other religions	1,949	0.46%	3,450	0.67%
Not Stated	39,525	9.26%	41,600	8.11%
Total	426,715	100%	513,042	100%

== See also ==
- Mixed (United Kingdom ethnicity category)
- Mixed White and Black African people in the United Kingdom
