= Other Asian (United Kingdom ethnicity category) =

Total population
- United Kingdom: 1,010,209 - 1.5% (2021/22 Census)
- England: 952,127 – 1.7%
- Scotland: 32,187 – 0.6%
- Wales: 20,656 – 0.7%
- Northern Ireland: 8,985 – 0.47%

Religion
- Christianity, Islam, Hinduism, Sikh, Buddhism

Other Asians is an ethnic classification within the United Kingdom and has been used within the 2021 census to describe individuals who self-identify as a corresponding Asian ethnicity but do not fall under the largest four being British Indians, British Pakistanis, British Bangladeshis, and British Chinese.

The category itself is not a single group but rather a collection of a wide range of ethnicities who come from a variety of countries of birth and have a variety of languages and religions.

In 2021, they had a total population of 972,783 in England and Wales, corresponding to 1.6% of the population, an increase from 835,720 in 2011.

== Demographics ==
The Other Asian population is largely of working age.

=== Birthplace ===
In 2001, 1 in every 4 Other Asians originated from Sri Lanka.

Other Asian as a population pyramid in 2021

== Religion ==
Religion	England and Wales			
Religion	2011		2021	
Religion	Number	%	Number	%
Christianity	221,234	26.47%	254,248	26.14%
No religion	69,671	8.34%	104,487	10.74%
Judaism	960	0.11	472	0.05
Islam	194,485	23.27%	237,253	24.39%
Buddhism	93,581	11.20%	112,088	11.52%
Hinduism	148,438	17.76%	160,553	16.50%
Sikhism	50,564	6.05%	38,417	3.95%
Other religions	4,369	0.52%	12,844	1.32%
Not Stated	52,418	6.27%	52,463	5.39%
Total	835,720	100%	972,783	100%

== Ethnic groups ==
Ethnic group within the Asian Other group (in England and Wales)	2021		
Ethnic group within the Asian Other group (in England and Wales)	Population	% of total population	% of group makeup
Asian, Asian British or Asian Welsh: Filipino	162,138	0.3	16.7%
Asian, Asian British or Asian Welsh: Sri Lankan	149,239	0.3	15.3%
Asian, Asian British or Asian Welsh: Afghan	95,518	0.2	9.8%
Asian, Asian British or Asian Welsh: Nepali (includes Gurkha)	88,461	0.1	9.1%
Asian, Asian British or Asian Welsh: Tamil	45,863	0.1	4.7%
Asian, Asian British or Asian Welsh: Thai	39,962	0.1	4.1%
Asian, Asian British or Asian Welsh: Kashmiri	39,268	0.1	4.0%
Asian, Asian British or Asian Welsh: Iranian	39,135	0.1	4.0%
Asian, Asian British or Asian Welsh: Vietnamese	37,458	0.1	3.9%
Asian, Asian British or Asian Welsh: Japanese	29,510	0.0	3.0%
Asian, Asian British or Asian Welsh: Other Asian, Asian unspecified	23,362	0.0	2.4%
Asian, Asian British or Asian Welsh: Sikh	22,814	0.0	2.3%
Asian, Asian British or Asian Welsh: Korean	21,118	0.0	2.2%
Asian, Asian British or Asian Welsh: Mauritian/Seychellois/Maldivian/Sao Tomean/St Helenian	17,285	0.0	1.8%
Asian, Asian British or Asian Welsh: Any other ethnic group	17,098	0.0	1.8%
Asian, Asian British or Asian Welsh: Asian British	15,638	0.0	1.6%
Asian, Asian British or Asian Welsh: Other East Asian/ East Asian unspecified	14,563	0.0	1.5%
Asian, Asian British or Asian Welsh: Other Middle East	14,053	0.0	1.4%
Asian, Asian British or Asian Welsh: Malaysian	12,872	0.0	1.3%
Asian, Asian British or Asian Welsh: Kurdish	12,290	0.0	1.3%
Asian, Asian British or Asian Welsh: Punjabi	8,153	0.0	0.8%
Asian, Asian British or Asian Welsh: Turkish	7,619	0.0	0.8%
Asian, Asian British or Asian Welsh: Myanmar or Burmese	7,514	0.0	0.8%
Asian, Asian British or Asian Welsh: Indonesian	7,344	0.0	0.8%
Asian, Asian British or Asian Welsh: Other Mixed	7,095	0.0	0.7%
Asian, Asian British or Asian Welsh: Mixed South Asian	6,436	0.0	0.7%
Asian, Asian British or Asian Welsh: African Asian	5,553	0.0	0.6%
Asian, Asian British or Asian Welsh: Arab	5,288	0.0	0.5%
Asian, Asian British or Asian Welsh: Taiwanese	4,222	0.0	0.4%
Asian, Asian British or Asian Welsh: Tajikistani/Kazakhstani/Kyrgystani/Turkmenistani/Uzbekistani	3,661	0.0	0.4%
Asian, Asian British or Asian Welsh: African unspecified	3,296	0.0	0.3%
Asian, Asian British or Asian Welsh: Sinhalese	2,514	0.0	0.3%
Asian, Asian British or Asian Welsh: English/Welsh/Scottish/Northern Irish/British	2,394	0.0	0.2%
Asian, Asian British or Asian Welsh: Anglo Indian	2,065	0.0	0.2%
Asian, Asian British or Asian Welsh: Black and Asian	1,979	0.0	0.2%

== See also ==
- Sri Lankians in the United Kingdom
- Filipinos in the United Kingdom
