= Mixed White and Black African people in the United Kingdom =

Total population
- England and Wales: 249,596 – 0.42% (2021); Scotland and Northern Ireland: Figures unavailable

Regions with significant populations
- London; Manchester; Birmingham; Leeds; Liverpool; Bristol; Cardiff; Milton Keynes

Languages
- British English · Multicultural London English · African languages Afrikaans · French · Portuguese

Religion
- Predominantly Christianity (49.2%); minority follows Islam (9.2%), other faiths (1.1%) (Note: Including Buddhism (0.2%), Judaism (0.2%), Hinduism (0.1%), Sikhism (0.02%) and others) or are irreligious (33.1%); 2021 census, England and Wales only

Mixed White and Black African people in the United Kingdom are a multi-ethnic and biracial group of UK-residents who identify with, or are perceived to have, both White and Black African ancestry.

They constitute a growing minority of the people living in the United Kingdom, with 165,974 (0.3% of the population) persons identifying as 'Mixed White and Black African' in the 2011 United Kingdom census. This represented a national demographic increase of 54% from the 107,700 persons (0.2% of the population) in 2001.

In the United Kingdom censuses, 'Mixed White and Black African' is one of four subcategories of self-reported mixed ethnicity. The others are 'Mixed White and Black Caribbean', 'Mixed White and Asian', and 'Other Mixed'. Outside of the census, academics have studied the grouping, and resources regarding self-identity have explored emerging versions of mixed, white, black, and African identities in the United Kingdom.

== Terminology ==
Mixed White and Black African people are referenced and categorised across a multitude of areas of media, journalism and academia, as well as in relation to perceptions of personhood and self-identity. At times informally, they have been referred to as Mixed or Mixed-race White and Black African persons, people, and other variants, in the study and reporting of the group in the United Kingdom.

Within government-derived naming conventions, such as within the corresponding Office for National Statistics 'ethnic group' census category ('Mixed White and Black African'); the grouping is also widely referenced in relation to demographics of the country. This census category has been utilised by government, policing, the NHS, as well as non-governmental agencies, including charities, universities and other organisations.

=== Census ===
The option for the 'Mixed White and Black African' ethnic group was first introduced in the 2001 United Kingdom census. The category was listed alongside, and distinct from, various 'Mixed' subcategories, including 'Mixed White and Asian', 'Mixed White and Black Caribbean', and 'Mixed Other'.

=== Other organisations and government ===
Kirklees Council uses the abbreviated 'Ethnicity Code' of MWBA for Mixed White and Black African persons. The Equality and Human Rights Commission use it to study ethnic groups in the United Kingdom. In the country's education system, UCAS and HESA collect statistics on the grouping, providing analysis to improve participation in higher education for person who identify with both white and black African ancestry. NHS in Central Bedfordshire defines members of the group as an ethnic minority. The Welsh Government has used the category to analyse different ethnic minority groups and population compositions in the UK.

=== Use in academia ===
Ethnicity expert Peter J. Aspinall has made use of the category to evaluate changing perceptions of self-identity within the grouping between UK censuses. Professor of infectious disease epidemiology Ibrahim Abubakar has co-authored research in relation to COVID-19 which uses the grouping to analysis health outcomes of people with white and black African heritage within Britain.

== Demographics ==
White and Black African population by region and country
Region / Country	Population	Per cent of region
England	241,528	0.43%
Greater London	77,341	0.88%
South East	38,633	0.42%
North West	30,011	0.40%
East of England	27,376	0.43%
West Midlands	16,011	0.27%
Yorkshire and The Humber	15,644	0.29%
South West	15,644	0.27%
East Midlands	14,341	0.29%
North East	6,527	0.25%
Wales	8,068	0.26%
Figures based on the 2021 United Kingdom Census; Figures unavailable for Scotland and Northern Ireland (Note: The censuses for Scotland and Northern Ireland only provide data for a 'Mixed' category. No breakdown of the mixed ethnicities is provided.)

Mixed White and Black African population pyramid in 2021

=== Population and distribution ===
The population of persons of Mixed White and Black African ancestry rose from 107,700 to 165,974 between the 2001 and 2011 censuses. This represented a national demographic rise from 0.2% to 0.3% for the whole UK population.

In England, the share of the population of persons identifying as Mixed White and Black African declined from 0.4% to 0.3%. With regards census-based identity, according to research by academic Peter J. Aspinall, 56.8 percent of those identifying with the category, chose the same ethnic group in the following UK census.

== Religion ==
Religion	England and Wales			
Religion	2011		2021	
Religion	Number	%	Number	%
Christianity	94,405	56.88%	122,830	49.21%
No religion	39,204	23.62%	82,522	33.06%
Islam	15,681	9.45%	23,078	9.25%
Judaism	432	0.26%	447	0.18%
Buddhism	464	0.28%	552	0.22%
Hinduism	339	0.20%	208	0.08%
Sikhism	105	0.06%	51	0.02%
Other religions	708	0.43%	1,477	0.59%
Not Stated	14,636	8.82%	18,441	7.39%
Total	165,974	100%	249,596	100%

== Culture and society ==
=== Education ===
In 2016 data, Mixed White and Black African pupils had a 20% eligibility rate for free school meals. Of those eligible, 43% achieved 5 or more A* to C grade GCSEs, while those ineligible had a 60% rate, representing an 18% achievement gap. Chinese Britons had the smallest gap at 3% and White British had the highest at 33%. In contrast with other mixed groupings in the local authority, Mixed White and Black African pupils performed near to the group's national average in Lambeth.

People who identify with mixed white and black African ancestry are eligible for Newcastle University's Partner Programme. The Universities and Colleges Admissions Service, along with the Higher Education Statistics Agency, has attempted to identify underrepresentation within the grouping, and encourage higher education participation.

=== Health ===
In 2020 research on COVID-19-related deaths on different ethnic groups in the UK, data for standardised mortality ratios and confidence intervals showed that, while White British persons were at lower risk than the national average, and Black African persons were at higher risk; persons identifying as Mixed White and Black African demonstrated neither increased or reduced risk of mortality. A 2010 study also found the group demonstrating a median data position between the same two other census categories. They were found to be less likely to consume alcohol than White British persons, and more likely than Black African persons.

=== Representations ===
Many public figures from various fields and professions in the United Kingdom have spoken about their experiences as mixed race persons who possess what they, or various media, have defined as white and black African ancestry. Raised in Wales by an English mother and Nigerian father, singer Shirley Bassey's upbringing as a "mixed-race child brought up by a white mother" has been described as "highly unusual" for 1930s Britain. Also a singer, Emeli Sandé has referred to "the Talk" as a conversation that parents are faced with when black and mixed-race children first experience racism. Sandé, who has a white mother and black Zimbabwean father, was responding to the George Floyd protests in 2020. Fellow singer Raye, who has English, Swiss and Ghanaian heritage, believes that being mixed race has contributed to her ability to span music genres.

Actress Ashley Madekwe has stated "I'm mixed race, and I'm very proud of that fact." Madwekwe suggested that "I don't look white. I can't really play white" characters. Also relating to casting in the film industry, Carmen Ejogo, who has Scottish and Nigerian ancestry, has proposed that her mixed-race heritage made her susceptible to a form of exoticism-based typecasting. With English, German Jewish, and Ghanaian ancestry, journalist Afua Hirsch concurs that the perceived exoticism of mixed race people has been exploited in media and advertising:

And where as a child I longed for the normality of seeing a physical resemblance in others, now images of mixed-race people are everywhere. The trademark look; curly hair, brown skin, features that are a touch exotic but not so different as to be threatening to the mainstream, is used to sell sofas, house insurance, gym memberships and mobile phones. It's as if we have become the new, acceptable face of blackness.

Politicians Chuka Umunna and Helen Grant self-identify as mixed race; both being of English and Nigerian extraction. Actress Tupele Dorgu believes that her black Nigerian father and white English mother's marriage was judged in a discriminatory manner by members of her community growing up in Manchester, England.

== Notable contributions ==
=== Arts and entertainment ===
Notable actors and actresses who are from or based in the UK have been described as being mixed race, and either referenced in media with or identify themselves as having both white and black African ancestry. Thandie Newton has English and Zimbabwean ancestry. Nimmy March, and Gugu Mbatha-Raw are of South African and English ancestry. Sophie Okonedo has maternal Polish Jewish and Russian Jewish heritage, and paternal Nigerian ancestry. Georgina Campbell has English and Jamaican ancestry.

Actors O-T Fagbenle, and Luti Fagbenle, and actresses Ashley Madekwe, Fola Evans-Akingbola, Nina Sosanya, and Tupele Dorgu are of English and Nigerian heritage. Carmen Ejogo has Scottish and Nigerian ancestry, while Richard Ayoade, and Hannah John-Kamen are of Norwegian and Nigerian descent. Kananu Kirimi has Scottish and Kenyan ancestry, and Adjoa Andoh is of English and Ghanaian descent.

=== Broadcasting and journalism ===
Afua Hirsch is of English, German Jewish, and Ghanaian descent.

=== Music ===
Many notable musicians and singers based in or originating from the United Kingdom have been identified as having both white and black African ancestry. Sade and Shirley Bassey are of English and Nigerian extraction. Emeli Sandé has English and Zimbabwean ancestry. Raye is of English, Swiss and Ghanaian descent, and MC Harvey has English and Sierra Leonean heritage.

=== Politics ===
Several notable politicians, including current and former members of Parliament, have self-identified, or otherwise have been described as being of mixed heritage, with both white and black African ancestry. Helen Grant has English and Nigerian ancestry, whereas Chuka Umunna is of English, Irish and Nigerian descent. Adam Afriyie is of English and Ghanaian, and Paul Boateng of Scottish and Ghanaian extraction. Linda Bellos has Polish Jewish and Nigerian, Vaughan Gething is of Welsh and Zambian, and Mark Hendrick has English and Somali heritage.

== See also ==
- Ethnic groups in the United Kingdom
- British Black English
- UK Mixed ethnicity categories
