= Cvetković Brdo =

- Village
- Location within Croatia
- Coordinates: 45°34′5″N 15°58′23″E
- Country: Croatia
- Region: Central Croatia
- County: Zagreb County
- Municipality: Velika Gorica

Area
  - Total: 2.7 km^{2} (1.0 sq mi)

Population (2021)
  - Total: 25
  - Density: 9.3/km^{2} (24/sq mi)
- Time zone: UTC+1 (CET)
  - Summer (DST): UTC+2 (CEST)

Cvetković Brdo is a village in Vukomericke Gorice, Zagreb County, Croatia. It is located above the valley of the Kravaršćica stream. The 2011 census recorded 32 inhabitants living in 17 households. It occupies an area of 2.90 square kilometers, and has a population density of approximately 11 inhabitants per square kilometer. Once a much more populous place, it was devastated by two great waves of displacement. The first occurred in 1939, on the eve of World War II, and the second after the war, from 1945 onwards. The largest part of the population permanently settled in Slavonia, in Nijemci (near Vinkovci), Nard (near Valpovo) and Cret Bizovački (near Osijek).

== Population ==
Village of Cvetković Brdo: Population trends 1857–2021
v

population	174	188	173	185	200	217	202	213	158	146	127	120	101	69	45	32	25
	1857	1869	1880	1890	1900	1910	1921	1931	1948	1953	1961	1971	1981	1991	2001	2011	2021

Sources: Publikacije Državnog zavoda za statistiku Republike Hrvatske

== Monuments and landmarks ==
- Chapel of St. Roka
