= Donja Lomnica =

Donja Lomnica may refer to:

- Donja Lomnica (Vlasotince), a village near Vlasotince, Serbia
- Donja Lomnica, Croatia, a village near Velika Gorica, Croatia
