= Šiljakovina =

- Village
- Location within Croatia
- Coordinates: 45°38′6″N 16°1′8″E
- Country: Croatia
- Region: Central Croatia
- County: Zagreb County
- Municipality: Velika Gorica

Area
  - Total: 16.5 km^{2} (6.4 sq mi)

Population (2021)
  - Total: 654
  - Density: 39.6/km^{2} (103/sq mi)
- Time zone: UTC+1 (CET)
  - Summer (DST): UTC+2 (CEST)

Šiljakovina is a village in Croatia.
