= Bukovčak =

- Village
- Location within Croatia
- Coordinates: 45°37′26″N 15°56′20″E
- Country: Croatia
- Region: Central Croatia
- County: Zagreb County
- Municipality: Velika Gorica

Area
  - Total: 3.2 km^{2} (1.2 sq mi)

Population (2021)
  - Total: 61
  - Density: 19/km^{2} (49/sq mi)
- Time zone: UTC+1 (CET)
  - Summer (DST): UTC+2 (CEST)

Bukovčak is a village in Croatia.
