= Turopolje, Zagreb County =

Turopolje
- Village
- Location within Croatia
- Coordinates: 45°38′56″N 16°8′24″E
- Country: Croatia
- Region: Central Croatia
- County: Zagreb County
- Municipality: Velika Gorica

Area
  - Total: 1.3 km^{2} (0.50 sq mi)

Population (2021)
  - Total: 776
  - Density: 600/km^{2} (1,500/sq mi)
- Time zone: UTC+1 (CET)
  - Summer (DST): UTC+2 (CEST)

Turopolje is a village in Croatia.
