= Ribnica, Croatia =

Ribnica
- Village
- Interactive map of Ribnica
- Coordinates: 45°43′N 16°08′E
- Country: Croatia
- Region: Central Croatia
- County: Zagreb County
- Town: Velika Gorica

Area
  - Total: 6.8 km^{2} (2.6 sq mi)

Population (2021)
  - Total: 790
  - Density: 120/km^{2} (300/sq mi)
- Time zone: UTC+1 (CET)
  - Summer (DST): UTC+2 (CEST)

Ribnica is a small village in Croatia, 25 km south-east of Zagreb. It is administratively a part of the city of Velika Gorica and it has a population of 803 (census 2011).
