= Obrezina =

- Village
- Location within Croatia
- Coordinates: 45°46′16″N 16°6′32″E
- Country: Croatia
- Region: Central Croatia
- County: Zagreb County
- Municipality: Velika Gorica

Area
  - Total: 1.8 km^{2} (0.69 sq mi)

Population (2021)
  - Total: 403
  - Density: 220/km^{2} (580/sq mi)
- Time zone: UTC+1 (CET)
  - Summer (DST): UTC+2 (CEST)

Obrezina is a village in Croatia.
