= Bapča =

- Village
- Location within Croatia
- Coordinates: 45°44′35″N 16°6′4″E
- Country: Croatia
- Region: Central Croatia
- County: Zagreb County
- Municipality: Velika Gorica

Area
  - Total: 1.6 km^{2} (0.62 sq mi)

Population (2021)
  - Total: 109
  - Density: 68/km^{2} (180/sq mi)
- Time zone: UTC+1 (CET)
  - Summer (DST): UTC+2 (CEST)

Bapča is a village in Croatia.
