= Strmec Bukevski =

- Village
- Location within Croatia
- Coordinates: 45°44′42″N 16°10′1″E
- Country: Croatia
- Region: Central Croatia
- County: Zagreb County
- Municipality: Velika Gorica

Area
  - Total: 6.1 km^{2} (2.4 sq mi)

Population (2021)
  - Total: 378
  - Density: 62/km^{2} (160/sq mi)
- Time zone: UTC+1 (CET)
  - Summer (DST): UTC+2 (CEST)

Strmec Bukevski is a village located in the municipality of Velika Gorica in Zagreb County, Croatia.
