= Poljana Čička =

- Village
- Location within Croatia
- Coordinates: 45°40′59″N 16°10′48″E
- Country: Croatia
- Region: Central Croatia
- County: Zagreb County
- Municipality: Velika Gorica

Area
  - Total: 7.5 km^{2} (2.9 sq mi)

Population (2021)
  - Total: 623
  - Density: 83/km^{2} (220/sq mi)
- Time zone: UTC+1 (CET)
  - Summer (DST): UTC+2 (CEST)

Poljana Čička is a village in Croatia.
