= Obilić =

Obilić may refer to:

- Miloš Obilić (died 1389), a legendary medieval Serbian knight who died in the Battle of Kosovo

== Places ==
- Obilić, Kosovo, a town and municipality in central Kosovo
- Obilić, Bojnik, a village in Serbia

== Honours ==
- Obilić Medal, founded in 1847 by Njegoš as the highest military decoration in Montenegro
- Golden Medal of Miloš Obilić or Medal for Bravery, a Serbian state decoration founded in 1913 by King Peter I
- Order of Miloš Obilić, an Order of the Republic of Srpska established in 1993

== Sports ==
- FK Obilić, a football club based in Belgrade, Serbia
- FK Obilić Stadium, a multi-purpose stadium in Belgrade, Serbia
- FK Obilić Herceg Novi, a football club from the village Herceg Zelenika, Montenegro

== See also ==
- Kobilić
