= Črnkovec =

- Village
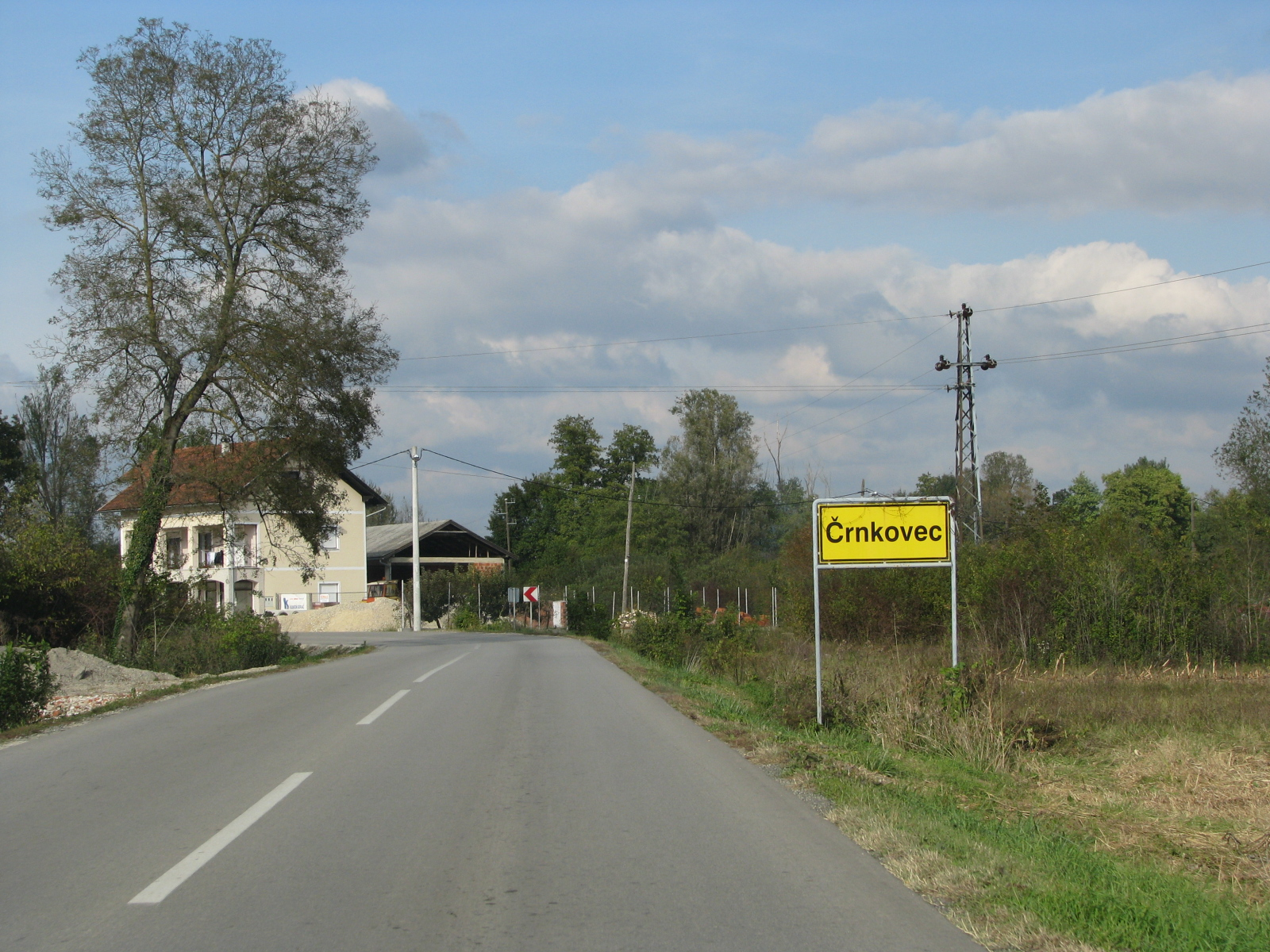

- Location within Croatia
- Coordinates: 45°45′4″N 16°7′12″E
- Country: Croatia
- Region: Central Croatia
- County: Zagreb County
- Municipality: Velika Gorica

Area
  - Total: 4.2 km^{2} (1.6 sq mi)

Population (2021)
  - Total: 339
  - Density: 81/km^{2} (210/sq mi)
- Time zone: UTC+1 (CET)
  - Summer (DST): UTC+2 (CEST)

Črnkovec is a village in Croatia.
