= Kozjača =

Coordinates: 45°36′N 16°01′E

- Village
- Interactive map of Kozjača
- Country: Croatia
- Region: Central Croatia
- County: Zagreb County
- Municipality: Velika Gorica

Area
  - Total: 6.1 km^{2} (2.4 sq mi)

Population (2021)
  - Total: 305
  - Density: 50/km^{2} (130/sq mi)
- Time zone: UTC+1 (CET)
  - Summer (DST): UTC+2 (CEST)

Kozjača is a village in Croatia.
