= Velika Gorica =

City in Zagreb County, Croatia

- City
- Grad Velika Gorica; City of Velika Gorica
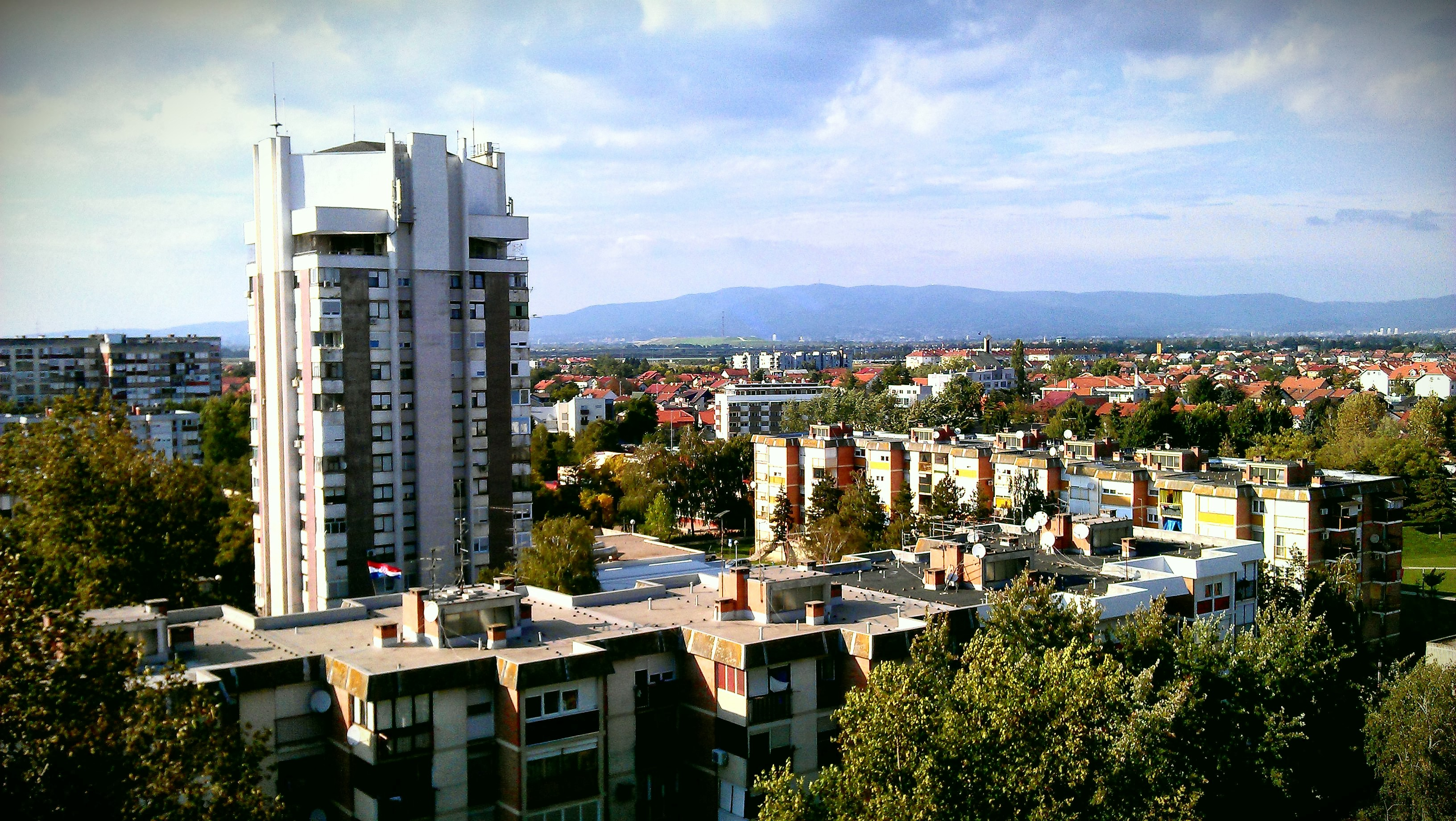
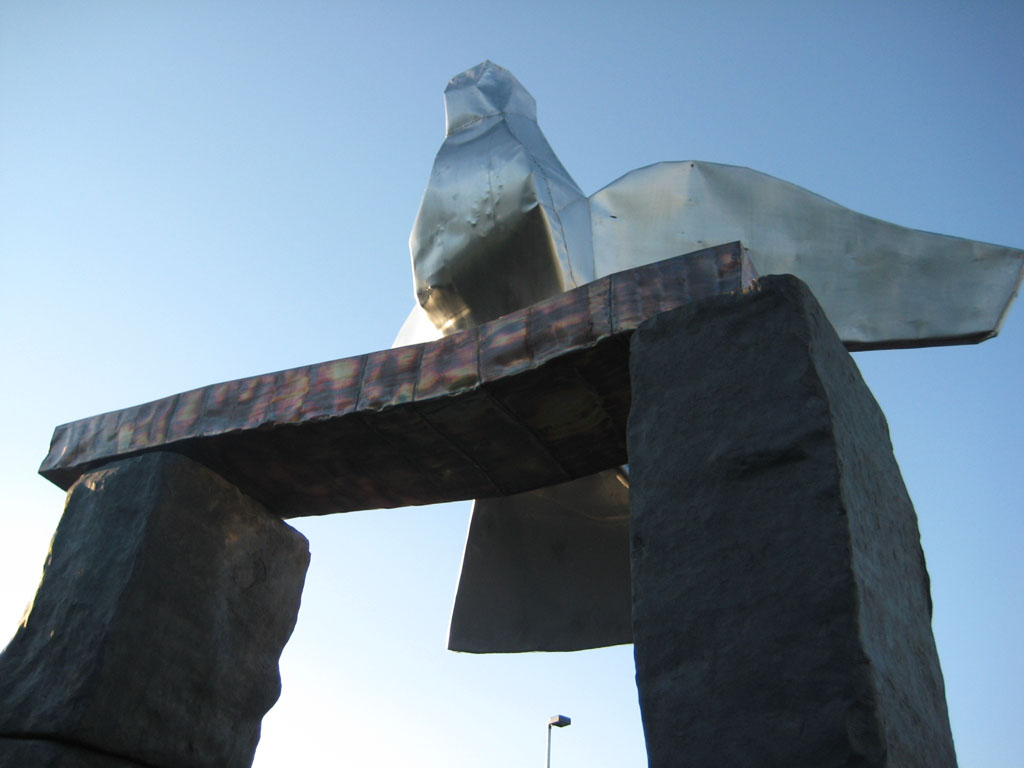
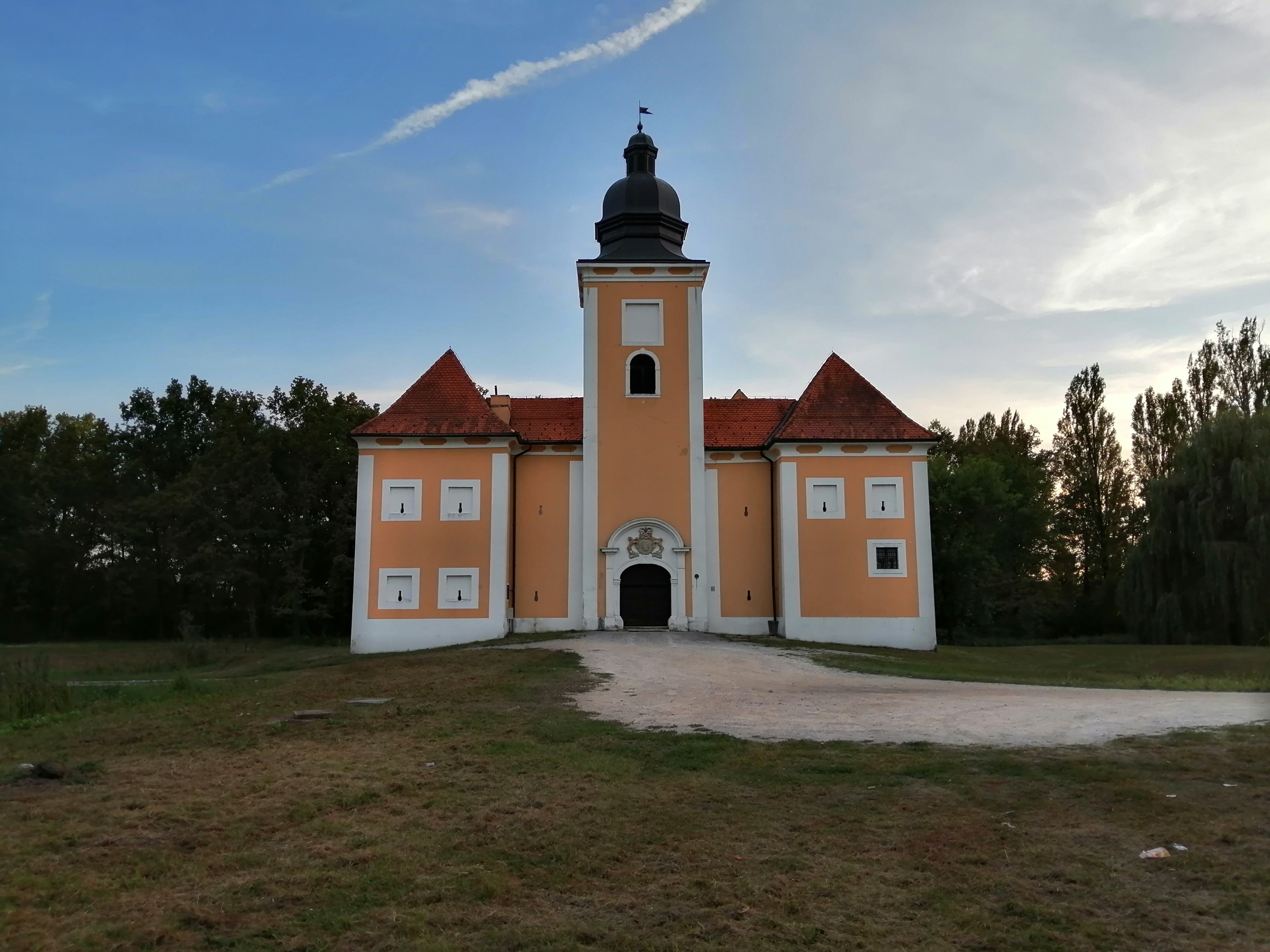
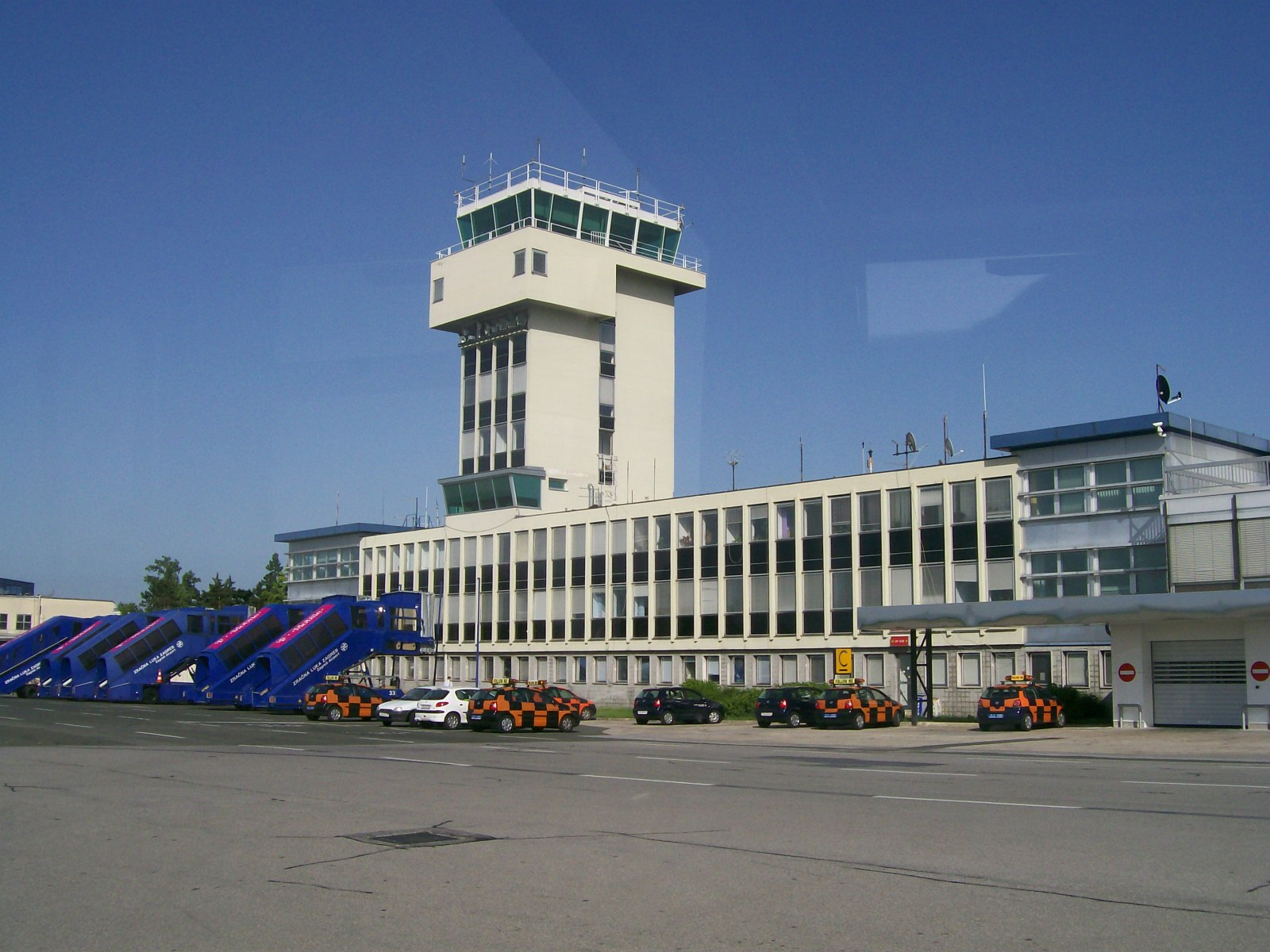
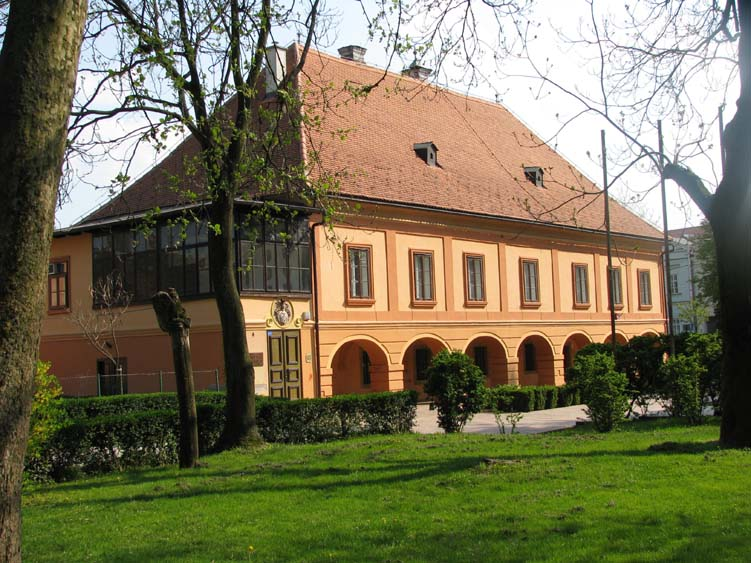
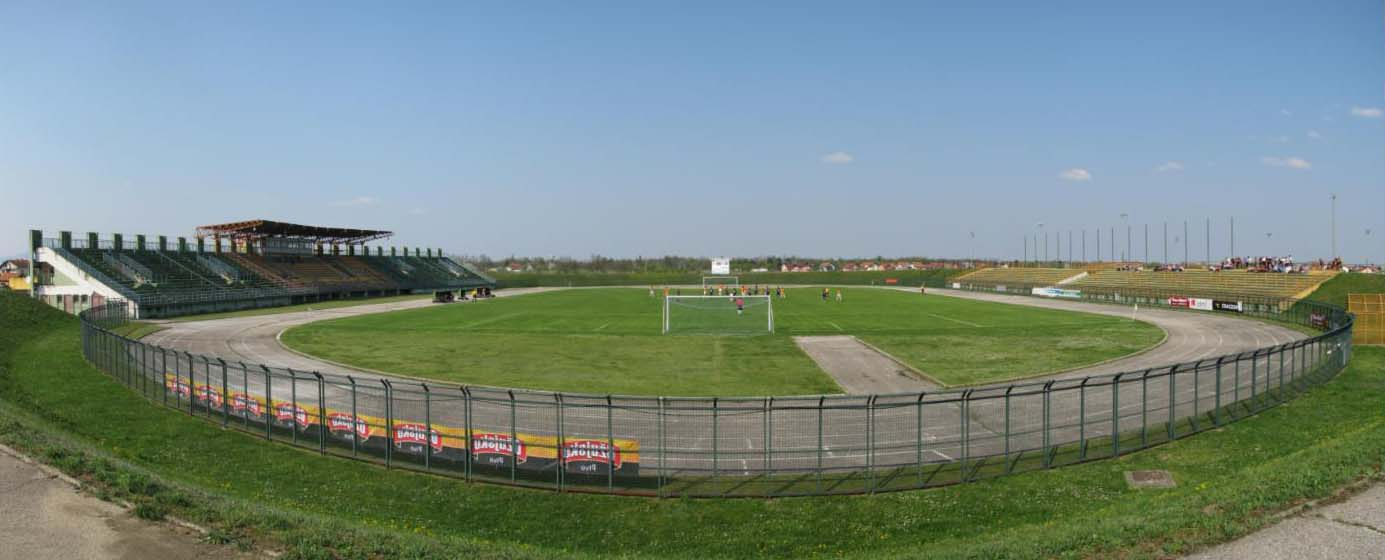
- From top left: Panorama of Velika Gorica, Old castle Lukavec, Turopolje Museum, Stadion Radnik, Zagreb Airport and Monument to fallen soldiers in the Croatian War of Independence

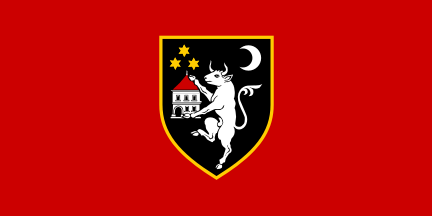
- Flag Coat of arms
- Nicknames: Gorica, VeGe
- Interactive map of Velika Gorica
- Location of Velika Gorica within Croatia
- Coordinates: 45°42′N 16°04′E
- Country: Croatia
- Region: Central Croatia (Turopolje)
- County: Zagreb County

Government
  - Mayor: Krešimir Ačkar (HDZ)

Area
  - City: 326.6 km^{2} (126.1 sq mi)
  - Urban: 36.9 km^{2} (14.2 sq mi)
- Elevation: 96 m (315 ft)

Population (2021)
  - City: 61,075
  - Density: 187.0/km^{2} (484.3/sq mi)
  - Urban: 30,036
  - Urban density: 814/km^{2} (2,110/sq mi)
- Time zone: UTC+1 (CET)
  - Summer (DST): UTC+2 (CEST)
- Postal code: HR-10 410
- Area code: +385 1
- License plate: ZG
- Patron saints: St. Lucia
- Website: gorica.hr

Velika Gorica (Croatian pronunciation: [ʋêlikaː ɡǒritsa]) is the largest and most populous city in Zagreb County, Croatia. According to the 2011 census, the city itself has a population of 31,341, and the municipality has a population of 63,517 inhabitants.

Velika Gorica is the centre of the historical Turopolje region. Franjo Tuđman Airport, the largest and busiest airport in Croatia, is located in the area of Velika Gorica.

== Name ==
The name of the city consists of two words. The first one, Velika, is an adjective, meaning 'big'. The second one is Gorica, which in standard Croatian is a diminutive of the word gora 'hill'. However, in the local Kajkavian dialect, gorica means 'vineyard', hence the city's name literally translated is 'big vineyard'. This is because this area has produced wine since ancient times.

Velika Gorica also has (or had) names in other languages, notably Hungarian Nagygoricza and German Gross-Gorica.

== Geography ==
The City of Velika Gorica, located 16 km (9.94 mi) south of Zagreb, is the centre of an area covering 552 square kilometres (213 square miles). Up until 1990 Velika Gorica had the status of a municipality and after that it became a part of Zagreb. Velika Gorica gained city status in 1995. The area of the old Municipality of Velika Gorica was split into three municipalities – Kravarsko, Orle and Pokupsko.

Velika Gorica is the largest settlement and the administrative centre of the traditional Turopolje region. Regarding the Turopolje name, among the most common opinions is that the name, meaning "Tur field", comes from an old Slavic word "tur" which means Aurochs, an ancient type of cattle with long horns, which was a symbol of fertility and the sun god. These cattle died out in the 16th century. The cattle were closely related to agriculture. Plowing had a symbolic meaning, the fertilization of Mother Earth, so these cattle were often assumed to have "sacred" characteristics. Because of its importance in the life of the plowmen, "tur" became the basis for numerous toponyms. However, as recently as the 16th century, Turopolje was called Campus Zagrebiensis, i.e. "Zagreb field", or just Campus (field). At that time the name was replaced by "Tur field", i.e. Turopolje.

The A11 (Zagreb-Sisak) highway is planned to become the western bypass of Velika Gorica. State route D31 will be the eastern bypass. It is planned that these bypasses will relieve the traffic along the overcrowded Velikogorička road, the fastest link between Zagreb and Velika Gorica as of 2007.

== Population ==
Historical population
Year	Pop.	±%
1857	12,534	—
1869	13,822	+10.3%
1880	14,716	+6.5%
1890	17,056	+15.9%
1900	18,998	+11.4%
1910	20,840	+9.7%
1921	20,124	−3.4%
1931	22,544	+12.0%
1948	23,717	+5.2%
1953	24,965	+5.3%
1961	25,804	+3.4%
1971	28,392	+10.0%
1981	47,104	+65.9%
1991	56,884	+20.8%
2001	63,517	+11.7%
2011	63,517	+0.0%
2021	61,075	−3.8%
Source: Naselja i stanovništvo Republike Hrvatske 1857–2021, DZS

In the census of 2011, the total population of administrative area of the city (the municipality) was 63,517, in the following settlements:

- Bapča, population 129
- Bukovčak, population 65
- Buševec, population 886
- Cerovski Vrh, population 93
- Cvetković Brdo, population 32
- Črnkovec, population 412
- Donja Lomnica, population 1,732
- Donje Podotočje, population 375
- Drenje Šćitarjevsko, population 203
- Dubranec, population 349
- Gornja Lomnica, population 580
- Gornje Podotočje, population 491
- Gradići, population 1,860
- Gudci, population 374
- Gustelnica, population 118
- Jagodno, population 521
- Jerebić, population 41
- Ključić Brdo, population 214
- Kobilić, population 533
- Kozjača, population 342
- Kuče, population 1,453
- Lazi Turopoljski, population 57
- Lazina Čička, population 566
- Lekneno, population 383
- Lukavec, population 1,140
- Mala Buna, population 261
- Mala Kosnica, population 49
- Markuševec Turopoljski, population 328
- Mičevec, population 1,286
- Mraclin, population 1,074
- Novaki Šćitarjevski, population 158
- Novo Čiče, population 1,255
- Obrezina, population 555
- Ogulinec, population 292
- Okuje, population 467
- Petina, population 213
- Petravec, population 76
- Petrovina Turopoljska, population 708
- Poljana Čička, population 688
- Prvonožina, population 42
- Rakitovec, population 570
- Ribnica, population 802
- Sasi, population 159
- Selnica Šćitarjevska, population 535
- Sop Bukevski, population 85
- Staro Čiče, population 790
- Strmec Bukevski, population 366
- Šćitarjevo, population 442
- Šiljakovina, population 672
- Trnje, population 62
- Turopolje, population 952
- Velika Buna, population 856
- Velika Gorica, population 31,553
- Velika Kosnica, population 770
- Velika Mlaka, population 3,334
- Vukomerić, population 158
- Vukovina, population 947
- Zablatje Posavsko, population 61
City of Velika Gorica: Population trends 1857–2021
v

population	12534	13822	14716	17056	18998	20840	20124	22544	23717	24965	25804	28392	47104	56884	63517	63517	61075
	1857	1869	1880	1890	1900	1910	1921	1931	1948	1953	1961	1971	1981	1991	2001	2011	2021

Sources: Croatian Bureau of Statistics publications

== History ==
Velika Gorica and surrounding plain area by the Sava river have always been fertile and lush so it has been constantly inhabited since Neolithic. First major settlement was Andautonia, founded in 1st century where village of Šćitarjevo stands nowadays. It was an important Roman port on Sava river and city on roads connecting Siscia with Emona and Poetovio. The Roman town was large at the beginning of the 5th century.

Croats came to these parts in the 8th century and remains from early Croat culture were found in numerous places around city of Velika Gorica. Velika Gorica is first mentioned in 1228 as a seat of the Catholic parish. In 1278 noblemen from Turopolje joined into a union called Plemenita opčina turopoljska ("Noble municipality of Turopolje"). Plemenita opčina turopoljska was granted a rule over Turopolje by Croatian monarchs and exists still today with mainly ceremonial and not political role.

In the late 19th and early 20th century, Velika Gorica was a district capital in the Zagreb County of the Kingdom of Croatia-Slavonia.

The 20th century was by far the most important one in history of Velika Gorica as it grew from a village of 2,871 inhabitants to an important and one of the largest cities in Croatia with population over 60 thousand inhabitants. Until 1995 Velika Gorica was part of City of Zagreb and since then it has a city status of its own.

During the Croatian War of Independence the city played an important role because of two airports in its near distance. Velika Gorica's 153rd brigade of Croatian Army fought on battlefields all around Croatia.

A ceremonial parade, with more than 300 firefighters from 40 volunteer fire departments throuought Croatia, was held on June 13th, 2026, on the occasion of the 150th anniversary of the Velika Gorica Voluntary Fire Department (Dobrovoljno vatrogasno društvo Velika Gorica).

== Landmarks and sights ==
Main Velika Gorica's sight is the Turopolje Museum (Muzej Turopolja) which traces human presence in Turopolje since Neolithic. There are also a number of monuments scattered around the city and its environs.

Vrata od krča ("The Timber Gate") is a unique wooden monument to human labour, risen up in forest near the city. Monument was risen in 1779 as a symbol of reclaiming the fertile land from forest. It was torn down by the flood in 1914 and restored two years later.

Old town Lukavec is a very well preserved fortification first mentioned in 1256 as Caput Lukavec. It was built by wood as a defense from Ottoman invasion. It was first owned by Zagreb noblemen and Turopolje noblemen gained control over castle in 1553 when it already became a ruin. It was soon rebuild in stone and became a regular site of assembly of Turopolje noblemen.

Wooden chapels from Turopolje and Pokuplje are unique in the world. They can be traced far back in the early Middle Ages, but most of the preserved ones date from the 17th century. Today there are only 11 preserved wooden chapels left, three in Turopolje, two in Vukomeričke gorice and six in Pokuplje. They were built by groups of timber-workers and as a rule they were made of oak-tree.

There are several small monuments to World War II partisan movement (most famous being The Bomber Man in near city center) and also many monuments to Croatian soldiers who fought in Croatian War of Independence. The city has a monument to soldiers from the city who lost their lives in the Croatian War of Independence.

In a competition held among 5,300 European cities, Velika Gorica was awarded the Silver Flower of Europe – an award presented by the European Association for Flowers and Landscape Entente Florale. The award was accepted on 9 September 2004, in the French town of Aix-les-Bains.

== Education ==
Velika Gorica has four elementary schools (Eugen Kvaternik, Eugen Kumičić, Juraj Habdelić and Nikola Hribar) and four high schools (Vocational School Velika Gorica, Gymnasium Velika Gorica, Economy School of Velika Gorica and Aviation Technical School Rudolf Perešin). In addition, there is a higher education institute, the Velika Gorica University of Applied Sciences (Veleučilište Velika Gorica).

== Culture ==
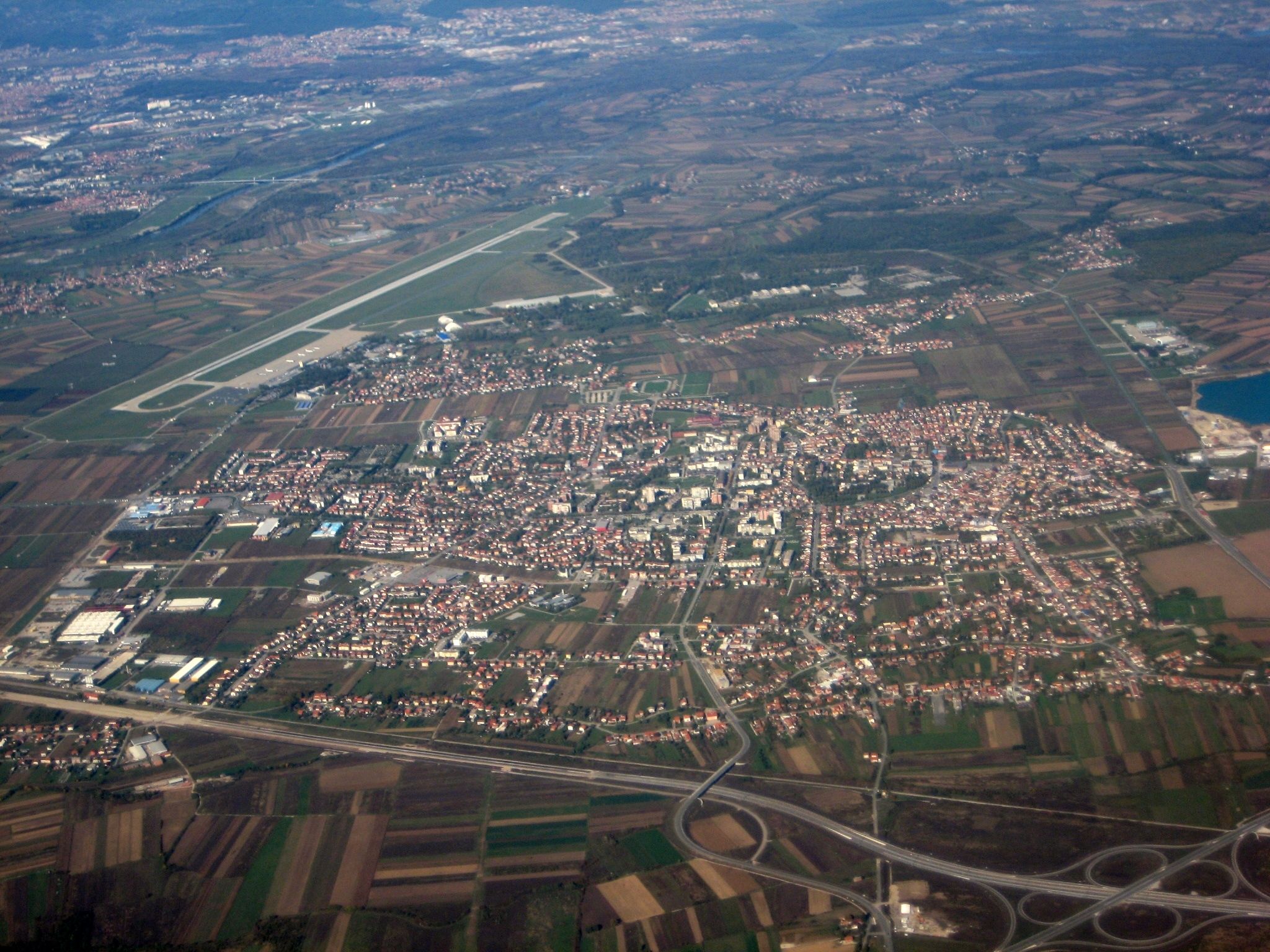
Velika Gorica from air

=== People's Open University ===
Established in 1960, the People's Open University (hr: Pučko otvoreno učilište Velika Gorica, shortform POUVG) began a phase of rich and complex development in its first home, a building which was previously an inn, and which was situated opposite the present-day building of this institution at 37 Zagrebačka Street. In the year of its establishment the institution as connected with the already existing Public Library, and three years later, in 1963, by the Cinema Company “Prosvjeta”. Together, they conducted their activities in the former House of Cooperatives “Zadružni dom”, where the present administration is situated and a part of the POU's activities are still performed today.

By initiating and developing numerous activities the university has spread out to new locations. The most important step was made in 1980, when the Cultural Centre was built, with an art gallery, an additional library and a chamber hall in Galženica, a part of Velika Gorica.

In the late 1980s the university was also using space in the old Secondary School at 5 Zagrebačka Street (the Music School), in the House of Social Protection (Dom društvene samozaštite), today’s Fire Brigade building (the radio-station) and in the Podbrežnica settlement (the library). In 1993 the Music School moved to a new building in Kolarova Street where it has remained until the present day.

Today, the People's Open University conducts theatre, gallery, concerts, publishing, cinema and other activities. During the mandate of the actress Senka Bulić (2006-2010) as head of the POU the university's theatre, Scena Gorica, came to the attention of the theatre public throughout the country. During her tenure Klub 100, a multimedia space for the development of urban culture, was additionally founded and became an important part of the cultural landscape for young people especially.

=== Libraries and galleries ===
Libraries and reading rooms have a long tradition in Turopolje. The Velika Gorica city library is the descendant of the Reading Room (Čitaonica) in Velika Gorica, established in 1886. Since October 1999 it has operated independently in two locations: the Central Library at 37 Zagrebačka Street and the Regional Galženica Library at 5 Stjepan Radić Square.

=== Turopolje Museum ===
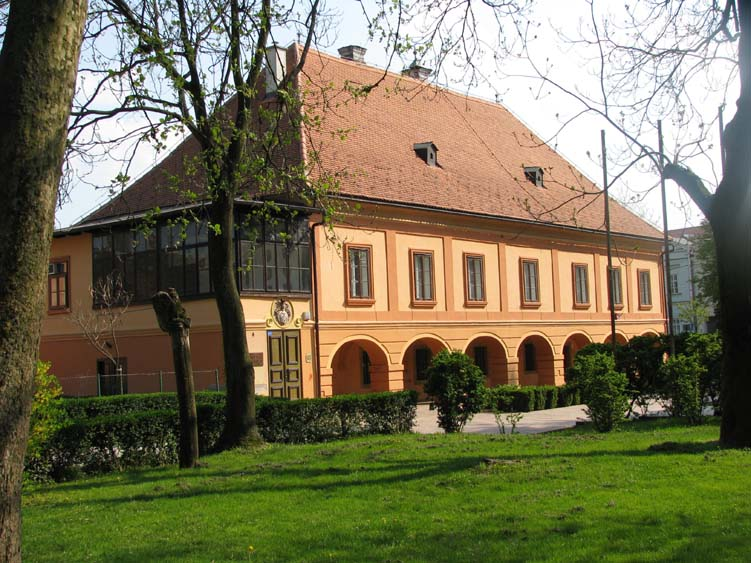
Turopolje Museum.

Founded in 1960, the Turopolje Museum is concerned with the preservation and promotion of the cultural heritage of the historic Turopolje, Pokuplje, Posavina and Vukomeričke gorice regions. The Museum is housed in a building dating from 1750, which previously served as the city hall of the Noble Commune of Turopolje. It is situated in the centre of Velika Gorica, on the eastern edge of the main park. This two-storey building with a colonnade on the ground floor was built in a Baroque style with elements of the traditional Turopolje architectural style. Assemblies called “spravišća” were once held in the large hall on the upper floor. The rooms next to the hall were archives where the important documents of the Noble Commune were kept. The ground floor at one time housed prison cells. The Museum has a collection comprising some 3,500 objects and over 10,000 photographical records. The Museum library has around 700 volumes on subjects relating to the region's history.

=== Public monuments ===
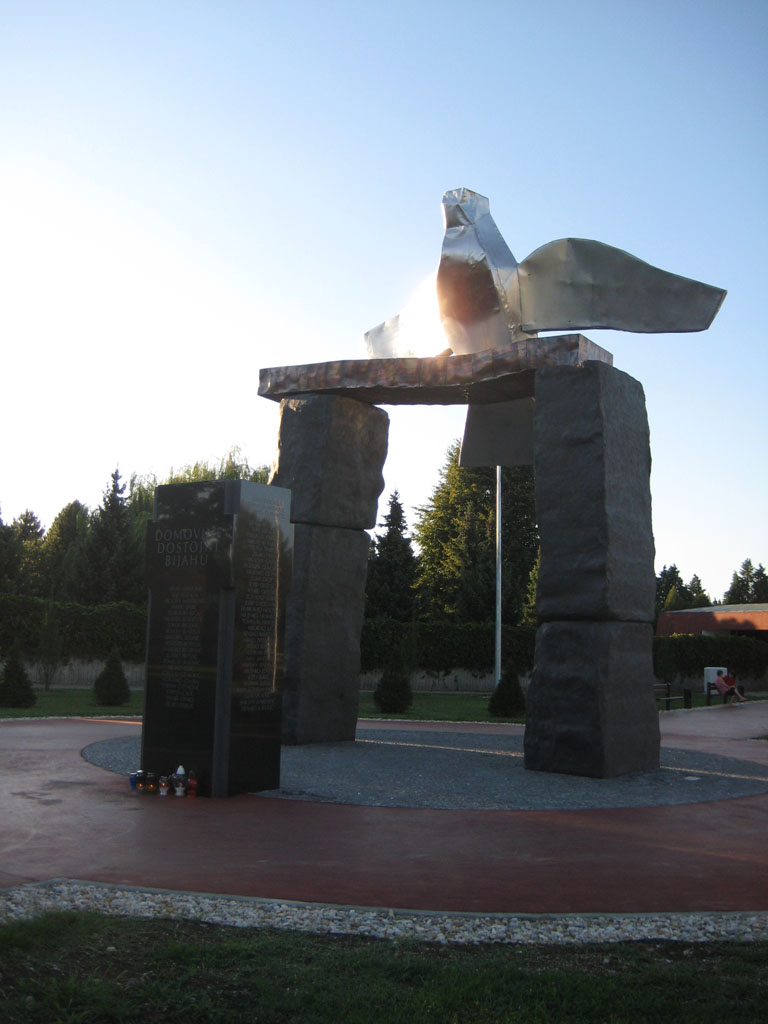
A monument to fallen soldiers in the Croatian War of Independence.

At the end of the 1970s in particular, moderately intensive development of Velika Gorica's city centre and the surrounding districts took place. In an attempt to accommodate the need both for green space and for an aesthetic dimension to development, over the city history a number of parks have been created, most of which contain pieces of public sculpture.

The beginning of the 21st century was most important for urban uprising of Velika Gorica. New central park was created that carries the name of first Croatian president, dr. Franjo Tuđman. Tuđman's park soon became one of the most important urban spaces in Velika Gorica.

== Sport ==
Sports clubs in Velika Gorica include the football clubs HNK Gorica and NK Udarnik, a men's handball club HRK Gorica, a women's volleyball club OK Azena and a men's basketball club KK Gorica.

HNK Gorica plays its home games at Stadion Radnik, built for 1987 Summer Universiade while NK Udarnik has its own field in Kurilovec neighborhood. Indoor sports are mainly played in the city sports hall. There also three elementary school sports halls in the city that are used by sports clubs for trainings and youth categories.

== People ==
- Vladimir Bakarić - communist politician in Socialist Yugoslavia
- Ivana Banfić - pop singer
- Igor Bišćan - former football player
- Tomislav Butina - former football player
- Mario Cvitanović - former football player
- Martina Dalić - former Croatian Minister of Finance
- Barbara Jelić-Ružić - former volleyball player
- Gordan Kožulj - swimmer
- Tonino Picula - former Croatian Minister of Foreign Affairs
- Ivo Pukanić - journalist and editor of Nacional
- Rene Medvešek - actor
- Sonja Smolec - writer
- Ivan Šuker - former Croatian Minister of Finance
- Robert Troha - basketball player
- Jacques Houdek - singer
- Marcelo Brozović - football player
- Joe Raduka - soccer player

== Sources ==
- Cresswell, Peterjon; Atkins, Ismay; Dunn, Lily (10 July 2006). Time Out Croatia (First ed.). London, Berkeley & Toronto: Time Out Group Ltd & Ebury Publishing, Random House Ltd. 20 Vauxhall Bridge Road, London SV1V 2SA. ISBN 978-1-904978-70-1.
