= Petravec =

Petravec may refer to places:

- Petráveč, a municipality and village in the Czech Republic
- Petravec, Croatia, a village near Velika Gorica
