= Gradići =

- Village
- Location within Croatia
- Coordinates: 45.707937°N 16.040993°E
- Country: Croatia
- Region: Central Croatia
- County: Zagreb County
- Municipality: Velika Gorica

Area
  - Total: 2.1 km^{2} (0.81 sq mi)

Population (2021)
  - Total: 1,871
  - Density: 890/km^{2} (2,300/sq mi)
- Time zone: UTC+1 (CET)
  - Summer (DST): UTC+2 (CEST)

Gradići is a village in Croatia.
