= Rakitovec =

Coordinates: 45°40′N 16°09′E

- Village
- Interactive map of Rakitovec
- Country: Croatia
- Region: Central Croatia
- County: Zagreb County
- Municipality: Velika Gorica

Area
  - Total: 12.0 km^{2} (4.6 sq mi)

Population (2021)
  - Total: 558
  - Density: 46.5/km^{2} (120/sq mi)
- Time zone: UTC+1 (CET)
  - Summer (DST): UTC+2 (CEST)

Rakitovec is a village in Croatia.
