= Mala Kosnica =

- Village
- Location within Croatia
- Coordinates: 45°45′18″N 16°5′2″E
- Country: Croatia
- Region: Central Croatia
- County: Zagreb County
- Municipality: Velika Gorica

Area
  - Total: 0.3 km^{2} (0.12 sq mi)

Population (2021)
  - Total: 44
  - Density: 150/km^{2} (380/sq mi)
- Time zone: UTC+1 (CET)
  - Summer (DST): UTC+2 (CEST)

Mala Kosnica is a village in Croatia.
