= Zablatje Posavsko =

- Village
- Location within Croatia
- Coordinates: 45°44′31″N 16°11′33″E
- Country: Croatia
- Region: Central Croatia
- County: Zagreb County
- Municipality: Velika Gorica

Area
  - Total: 2.7 km^{2} (1.0 sq mi)

Population (2021)
  - Total: 69
  - Density: 26/km^{2} (66/sq mi)
- Time zone: UTC+1 (CET)
  - Summer (DST): UTC+2 (CEST)

Zablatje Posavsko is a village in Croatia.
