= Gustelnica =

- Village
- Location within Croatia
- Coordinates: 45°36′18″N 15°58′37″E
- Country: Croatia
- Central Croatia: Region
- County: Zagreb County
- Municipality: Velika Gorica

Area
  - Total: 4.0 km^{2} (1.5 sq mi)

Population (2021)
  - Total: 100
  - Density: 25/km^{2} (65/sq mi)
- Time zone: UTC+1 (CET)
  - Summer (DST): UTC+2 (CEST)

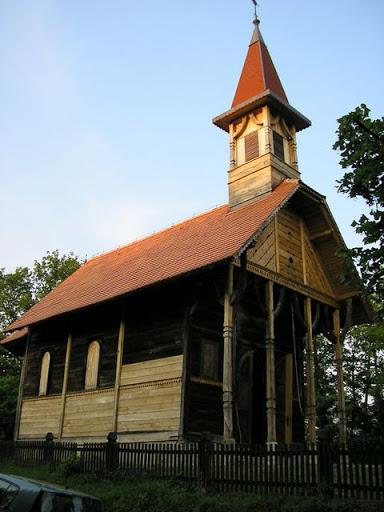
Church in Gustelnica

Gustelnica is a village located in the municipality of Velika Gorica in Zagreb County, Croatia.
