= Selnica Šćitarjevska =

- Village
- Location within Croatia
- Coordinates: 45°45′0″N 16°5′49″E
- Country: Croatia
- Region: Central Croatia
- County: Zagreb County
- Municipality: Velika Gorica

Area
  - Total: 1.6 km^{2} (0.62 sq mi)

Population (2021)
  - Total: 468
  - Density: 290/km^{2} (760/sq mi)
- Time zone: UTC+1 (CET)
  - Summer (DST): UTC+2 (CEST)

Selnica Šćitarjevska is a village in Croatia.
