= Prvonožina =

- Village
- Location within Croatia
- Coordinates: 45°35′28″N 15°57′42″E
- Country: Croatia
- Region: Central Croatia
- County: Zagreb County
- Municipality: Velika Gorica

Area
  - Total: 1.2 km^{2} (0.46 sq mi)

Population (2021)
  - Total: 28
  - Density: 23/km^{2} (60/sq mi)
- Time zone: UTC+1 (CET)
  - Summer (DST): UTC+2 (CEST)

Prvonožina is a village in Croatia.
