= Drenje Šćitarjevsko =

- Village
- Interactive map of Drenje Šćitarjevsko
- Location within Croatia
- Coordinates: 45°46′44″N 16°7′30″E
- Country: Croatia
- Region: Central Croatia
- County: Zagreb County
- Municipality: Velika Gorica

Area
  - Total: 2.1 km^{2} (0.81 sq mi)

Population (2021)
  - Total: 179
  - Density: 85/km^{2} (220/sq mi)
- Time zone: UTC+1 (CET)
  - Summer (DST): UTC+2 (CEST)

Drenje Šćitarjevsko is a village located in the Municipality of Velika Gorica in Zagreb County, Croatia. It is one of the smaller settlements in Turopolje and is located very close to the Sava River. According to the 2011 census, Drenje Šćitarjevsko had 203 inhabitants, living in an area of 2.23 square kilometers. The population density is 91 inhabitants per square kilometer.
