= Novaki Šćitarjevski =

- Village
- Location within Croatia
- Coordinates: 45°46′37″N 16°6′14″E
- Country: Croatia
- Region: Central Croatia
- County: Zagreb County
- Municipality: Velika Gorica

Area
  - Total: 2.3 km^{2} (0.89 sq mi)

Population (2021)
  - Total: 152
  - Density: 66/km^{2} (170/sq mi)
- Time zone: UTC+1 (CET)
  - Summer (DST): UTC+2 (CEST)

Novaki Šćitarjevski is a village in Croatia.
