= Gornje Podotočje =

- Village
- Location within Croatia
- Coordinates: 45°41′N 16°08′E
- Country: Croatia
- Region: Central Croatia
- County: Zagreb County
- Municipality: Velika Gorica

Area
  - Total: 3.0 km^{2} (1.2 sq mi)

Population (2021)
  - Total: 492
  - Density: 160/km^{2} (420/sq mi)
- Time zone: UTC+1 (CET)
  - Summer (DST): UTC+2 (CEST)

Gornje Podotočje is a village in Croatia.
