= Okuje =

Coordinates: 45°41′N 16°04′E

- Village
- Interactive map of Okuje
- Country: Croatia
- Region: Central Croatia
- County: Zagreb County
- Municipality: Velika Gorica

Area
  - Total: 4.5 km^{2} (1.7 sq mi)

Population (2021)
  - Total: 430
  - Density: 96/km^{2} (250/sq mi)
- Time zone: UTC+1 (CET)
  - Summer (DST): UTC+2 (CEST)

Okuje is a village in Croatia with a population of 467 (census 2011).
