= Sop Bukevski =

- Village
- Location within Croatia
- Coordinates: 45°44′28″N 16°12′54″E
- Country: Croatia
- Region: Central Croatia
- County: Zagreb County
- Municipality: Velika Gorica

Area
  - Total: 2.8 km^{2} (1.1 sq mi)

Population (2021)
  - Total: 68
  - Density: 24/km^{2} (63/sq mi)
- Time zone: UTC+1 (CET)
  - Summer (DST): UTC+2 (CEST)

Sop Bukevski is a village located in the municipality of Velika Gorica in Zagreb County, Croatia.
