= Lazi Turopoljski =

- Village
- Location within Croatia
- Coordinates: 45°38′57″N 16°06′20″E
- Country: Croatia
- Region: Central Croatia
- County: Zagreb County
- Municipality: Velika Gorica

Area
  - Total: 2.1 km^{2} (0.81 sq mi)

Population (2021)
  - Total: 30
  - Density: 14/km^{2} (37/sq mi)
- Time zone: UTC+1 (CET)
  - Summer (DST): UTC+2 (CEST)

Lazi Turopoljski is a village in Croatia.
