= Sasi, Croatia =

Sasi
- Village
- Location within Croatia
- Coordinates: 45°46′55″N 16°6′29″E
- Country: Croatia
- Region: Central Croatia
- County: Zagreb County
- Municipality: Velika Gorica

Area
  - Total: 1.3 km^{2} (0.50 sq mi)

Population (2021)
  - Total: 169
  - Density: 130/km^{2} (340/sq mi)
- Time zone: UTC+1 (CET)
  - Summer (DST): UTC+2 (CEST)

Sasi is a village located in the municipality of Velika Gorica in Zagreb County, Croatia.
