= Trnje, Zagreb County =

Trnje
- Village
- Location within Croatia
- Coordinates: 45°45′47″N 16°8′20″E
- Country: Croatia
- Region: Central Croatia
- County: Zagreb County
- Municipality: Velika Gorica

Area
  - Total: 1.3 km^{2} (0.50 sq mi)

Population (2021)
  - Total: 48
  - Density: 37/km^{2} (96/sq mi)
- Time zone: UTC+1 (CET)
  - Summer (DST): UTC+2 (CEST)

Trnje is a village in Croatia.
