= Lazina Čička =

- Village
- Location within Croatia
- Coordinates: 45°40′48″N 16°10′48″E
- Country: Croatia
- Central Croatia: Region
- County: Zagreb County
- Municipality: Velika Gorica

Area
  - Total: 7.0 km^{2} (2.7 sq mi)

Population (2021)
  - Total: 582
  - Density: 83/km^{2} (220/sq mi)
- Time zone: UTC+1 (CET)
  - Summer (DST): UTC+2 (CEST)

Lazina Čička is a village in Croatia.
