= Jagodno, Croatia =

Jagodno
- Village
- Location within Croatia
- Coordinates: 45°42′22″N 16°8′27″E
- Country: Croatia
- Central Croatia: Region
- County: Zagreb County
- Municipality: Velika Gorica

Area
  - Total: 1.9 km^{2} (0.73 sq mi)

Population (2021)
  - Total: 533
  - Density: 280/km^{2} (730/sq mi)
- Time zone: UTC+1 (CET)
  - Summer (DST): UTC+2 (CEST)

Jagodno is a village located in municipality of Velika Gorica in Zagreb County, Croatia.
