= Jerebić =

- Village
- Location within Croatia
- Coordinates: 45°34′41″N 15°57′47″E
- Country: Croatia
- Central Croatia: Region
- County: Zagreb County
- Municipality: Velika Gorica

Area
  - Total: 3.6 km^{2} (1.4 sq mi)

Population (2021)
  - Total: 38
  - Density: 11/km^{2} (27/sq mi)
- Time zone: UTC+1 (CET)
  - Summer (DST): UTC+2 (CEST)

Jerebić is a village located in the municipality of Velika Gorica in Zagreb County, Croatia.
