= Kuče =

Coordinates: 45°41′N 16°09′E

- Village
- Interactive map of Kuče
- Country: Croatia
- Region: Central Croatia
- County: Zagreb County
- Municipality: Velika Gorica

Area
  - Total: 32.8 km^{2} (12.7 sq mi)

Population (2021)
  - Total: 1,370
  - Density: 41.8/km^{2} (108/sq mi)
- Time zone: UTC+1 (CET)
  - Summer (DST): UTC+2 (CEST)

Kuče is a village in Croatia.
