= Markuševec Turopoljski =

- Village
- Location within Croatia
- Coordinates: 45°39′32″N 15°57′54″E
- Country: Croatia
- Region: Central Croatia
- County: Zagreb County
- Municipality: Velika Gorica

Area
  - Total: 3.9 km^{2} (1.5 sq mi)

Population (2021)
  - Total: 378
  - Density: 97/km^{2} (250/sq mi)
- Time zone: UTC+1 (CET)
  - Summer (DST): UTC+2 (CEST)

Markuševec Turopoljski is a village in Croatia.
