= Dubranec =

Coordinates: 45°37′N 15°58′E

- Village
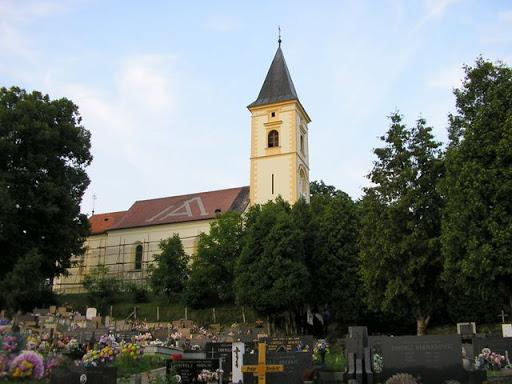
- Interactive map of Dubranec
- Country: Croatia
- Region: Central Croatia
- County: Zagreb County
- Municipality: Velika Gorica

Area
  - Total: 12.4 km^{2} (4.8 sq mi)

Population (2021)
  - Total: 346
  - Density: 27.9/km^{2} (72.3/sq mi)
- Time zone: UTC+1 (CET)
  - Summer (DST): UTC+2 (CEST)

Dubranec is a village in Croatia.
