= Novo Čiče =

Coordinates: 45°42′N 16°07′E

- Village
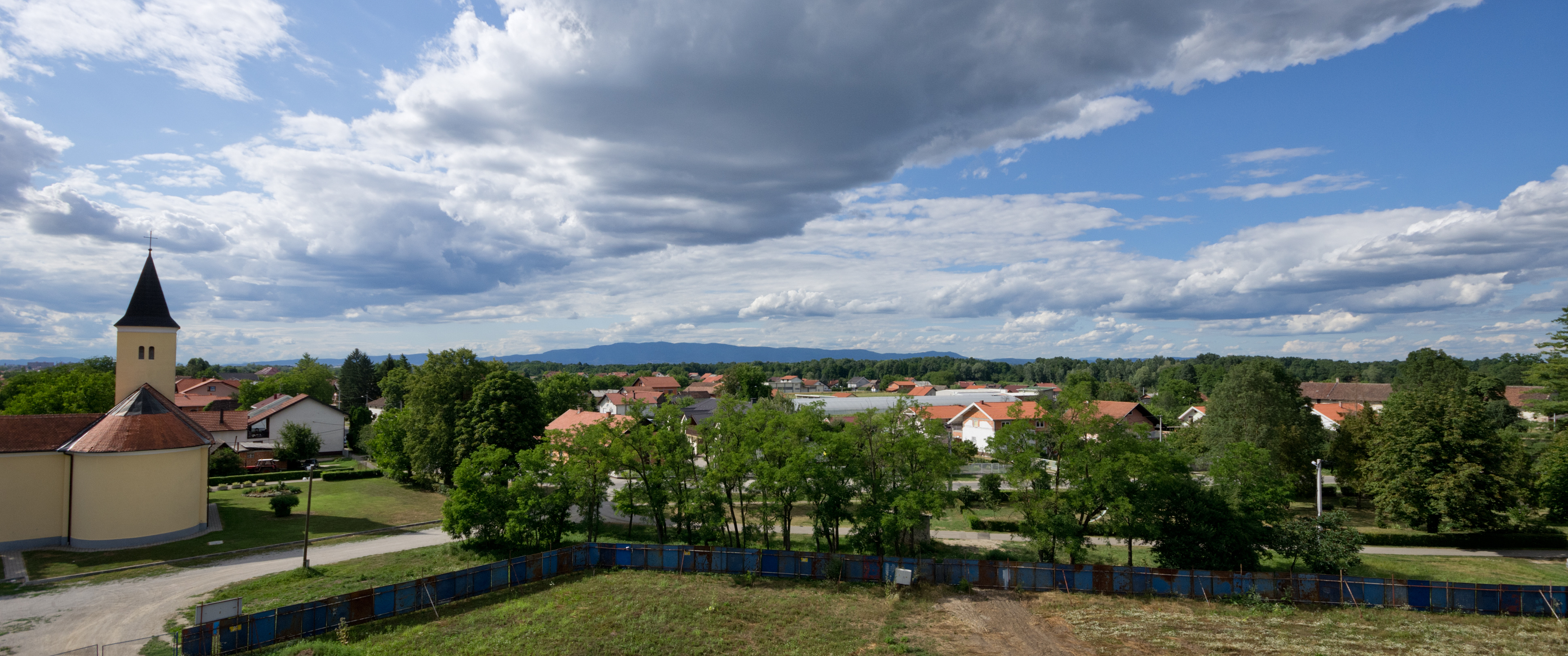
- Panorama of Novo Čiče
- Interactive map of Novo Čiče
- Country: Croatia
- Region: Central Croatia
- County: Zagreb County
- Municipality: Velika Gorica

Area
  - Total: 5.7 km^{2} (2.2 sq mi)
- Elevation: 105 m (344 ft)

Population (2021)
  - Total: 1,142
  - Density: 200/km^{2} (520/sq mi)
- Time zone: UTC+1 (CET)
  - Summer (DST): UTC+2 (CEST)
- Postal code: 10415
- Area code: 01
- Website: www.novocice.info

Novo Čiče is a village in Croatia, situated about 4 km south east from center of Velika Gorica. Novo Čiče is well known for its lake, created by gravel mining.

First records of the village date from 14th century when it was recorded as fiefdom near castle Želin.
