= Petrovina Turopoljska =

- Village
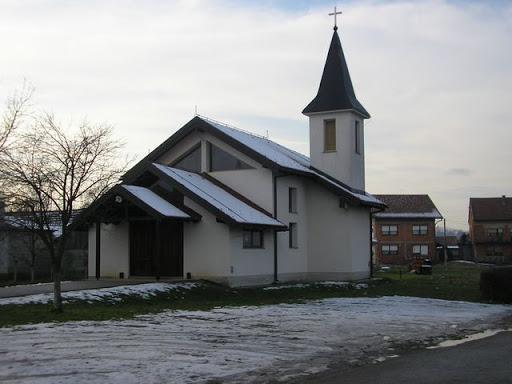
- A church in Petrovina, Croatia.

- Location within Croatia
- Coordinates: 45°41′35″N 16°1′52″E
- Country: Croatia
- Region: Central Croatia
- County: Zagreb County
- Municipality: Velika Gorica

Area
  - Total: 2.5 km^{2} (0.97 sq mi)

Population (2021)
  - Total: 765
  - Density: 310/km^{2} (790/sq mi)
- Time zone: UTC+1 (CET)
  - Summer (DST): UTC+2 (CEST)

Petrovina Turopoljska is a village in Croatia.

== History ==
On 26 March 2022 at 14:12 the ŽVOC Zagrebačke županije received a call about a wildfire in the area. 80 hectares (200 acres) burned by the time it was put out at 17:36 by JVP Velika Gorica, DVD Lukavec and DVD Gradići.
