= Ključić Brdo =

- Village
- Location within Croatia
- Coordinates: 45°37′12″N 16°02′31″E
- Country: Croatia
- Region: Central Croatia
- County: Zagreb County
- Municipality: Velika Gorica

Area
  - Total: 4.6 km^{2} (1.8 sq mi)

Population (2021)
  - Total: 233
  - Density: 51/km^{2} (130/sq mi)
- Time zone: UTC+1 (CET)
  - Summer (DST): UTC+2 (CEST)

Ključić Brdo is a village in Croatia.
