= Cerovski Vrh =

- Village
- Location within Croatia
- Coordinates: 45°34′34″N 15°56′31″E
- Country: Croatia
- Region: Central Croatia
- County: Zagreb County
- Municipality: Velika Gorica

Area
  - Total: 3.7 km^{2} (1.4 sq mi)

Population (2021)
  - Total: 90
  - Density: 24/km^{2} (63/sq mi)
- Time zone: UTC+1 (CET)
  - Summer (DST): UTC+2 (CEST)

Cerovski Vrh is a village in Croatia.
