= Vukomerić =

- Village
- Location within Croatia
- Coordinates: 45°37′N 15°57′E
- Country: Croatia
- Region: Central Croatia
- County: Zagreb County
- Municipality: Velika Gorica

Area
  - Total: 3.6 km^{2} (1.4 sq mi)

Population (2021)
  - Total: 125
  - Density: 35/km^{2} (90/sq mi)
- Time zone: UTC+1 (CET)
  - Summer (DST): UTC+2 (CEST)

Vukomerić is a village in Croatia.
