= Donja Lomnica, Croatia =

Donja Lomnica
- Village
- Location within Croatia
- Coordinates: 45°42′50″N 16°1′8″E
- Country: Croatia
- Region: Central Croatia
- County: Zagreb County
- Municipality: Velika Gorica

Area
  - Total: 13.5 km^{2} (5.2 sq mi)

Population (2021)
  - Total: 1,603
  - Density: 119/km^{2} (308/sq mi)
- Time zone: UTC+1 (CET)
  - Summer (DST): UTC+2 (CEST)

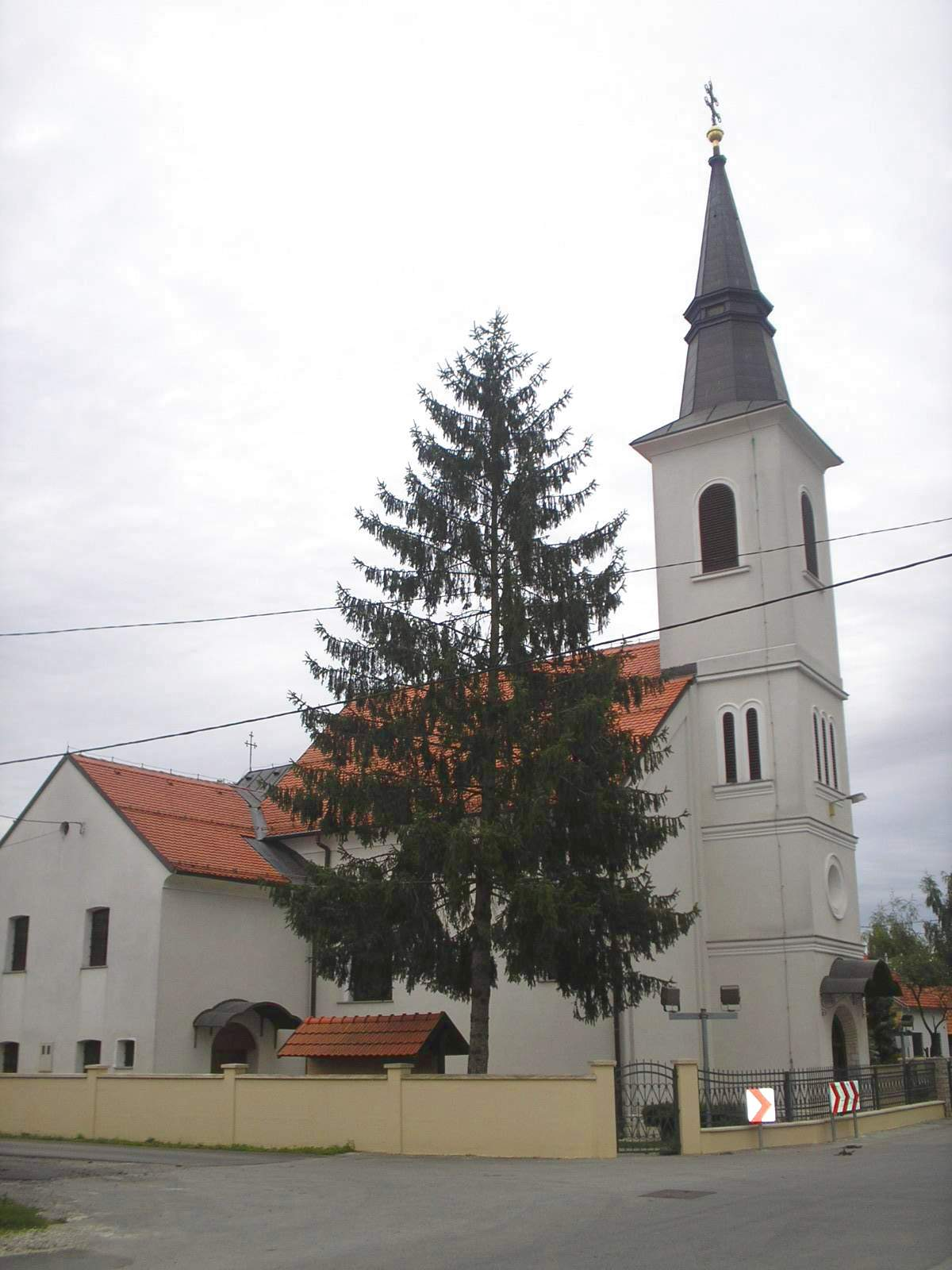

Donja Lomnica is a village in Croatia.
