= Kobilić =

Coordinates: 45°43′48″N 16°10′48″E

- Village
- Interactive map of Kobilić
- Country: Croatia
- Region: Central Croatia
- County: Zagreb County
- Municipality: Velika Gorica

Area
  - Total: 1.3 km^{2} (0.50 sq mi)

Population (2021)
  - Total: 536
  - Density: 410/km^{2} (1,100/sq mi)
- Time zone: UTC+1 (CET)
  - Summer (DST): UTC+2 (CEST)

Kobilić is a village in Croatia.
