= Vukomeričke gorice =

Wooded low mountain range in Zagreb County, Croatia

Coordinates: 45°34′45″N 16°00′11″E

Vukomeričke gorice (English: Vukomerić Hills) or Vrhovje, is a wooded low mountain range in Zagreb County, central Croatia. It is located on southwestern border of Turopolje region and up to 255 metres high. The name of the mountains comes from the village Vukomerić which got its name from Vukomer, leader of Vukota tribe that once lived in this area.

The area was settled since ancient times due to marshes surrounding it. Viticulture and fruit-growing are most important activities.

The Croatian state forestry company Hrvatske šume monitors the forests of Vukomeričke gorice. The most common trees are various species of oak, beech, and hornbeam.
