= Gudci =

Coordinates: 45°39′N 15°59′E

- Village
- Interactive map of Gudci
- Country: Croatia
- County: Zagreb County

Area
  - Total: 3.8 km^{2} (1.5 sq mi)

Population (2021)
  - Total: 384
  - Density: 100/km^{2} (260/sq mi)
- Time zone: UTC+1 (CET)
  - Summer (DST): UTC+2 (CEST)

Gudci is a village in Croatia.
