= Central Croatia =

Historical region of Croatia

Central Croatia / Croatia Proper Središnja/Uža Hrvatska
- Historical region of Croatia^{1}
- Flag Coat of arms

- Central Croatia; Striped area: Gračac Municipality
- Country: Croatia
- Largest city: Zagreb

Area^{2}
  - Total: 29,302 km^{2} (11,314 sq mi)

Population^{2}
  - Total: 2,224,623
  - Density: 75.921/km^{2} (196.63/sq mi)
- Croatia proper is not an official subdivision of the Republic of Croatia, it is a historical region. The flag and arms below are also unofficial/historical; none are legally defined at present. The figures are an approximation based on the statistical data for ten Croatian counties (Bjelovar-Bilogora, Karlovac, Koprivnica-Križevci, Krapina-Zagorje, Lika-Senj, Littoral-Gorski Kotar, Međimurje, Sisak-Moslavina, Varaždin, Zagreb) and the City of Zagreb.

In contemporary geography, the terms Central Croatia (Croatian: Središnja Hrvatska) and Mountainous Croatia (Gorska Hrvatska) are used to describe most of the area sometimes historically known as Croatia Proper (Uža Hrvatska), one of the four historical regions of the Republic of Croatia, together with Dalmatia, Istria, and Slavonia. It is located between Slavonia in the east, the Adriatic Sea in the west, and Dalmatia to the south. The region is not officially defined, and its borders and extent are described differently by various sources. The term Central Croatia refers to the northeastern part, and the term Mountainous Croatia refers to the southwestern part of the territory; the far western part is known as the Croatian Littoral; likewise the terms 'Zagreb macroregion' and 'Rijeka macroregion' can be used instead. Central Croatia is the most significant economic area of the country, contributing well over 50% of Croatia's gross domestic product. The capital of the Republic of Croatia, Zagreb, is the largest city and most important economic centre in Central Croatia.

Croatia proper comprises several smaller regions of its own: Lika, Gorski Kotar, Zagorje, Međimurje, the Croatian Littoral, Podravina, Posavina, Kordun, Banovina, Prigorje, Turopolje, Moslavina, and Žumberak. The region covers 28,337 square kilometres (10,941 square miles) of land and has a population of 2,418,214. Croatia proper straddles the boundary between the Dinaric Alps and the Pannonian Basin. The boundary of these two geomorphological units runs from Žumberak to Banovina, along the Sava River. The Dinaric Alps area is typified by karst topography, while the Pannonian Basin exhibits plains, especially in the river valleys—along the Sava, Drava, and Kupa—interspersed with hills and mountains developed as horst and graben structures. Lika and Gorski Kotar are part of the Dinaric Alps, and contain five out of eight mountains in Croatia higher than 1,500 metres (4,900 feet). Karst topography predominates in that area, resulting in specific landforms and hydrology because of the interaction of the karst and the region's watercourses—this is exemplified by the Plitvice Lakes. Most of the region has a moderately warm and rainy continental climate, although there is considerable seasonal snow at greater elevations. The region belongs almost exclusively to the Black Sea drainage basin and includes most of the large rivers flowing in Croatia.

The boundaries of Croatia proper were shaped by territorial losses of medieval Croatia to the Republic of Venice and the Ottoman conquest starting in the 15th century. In effect, Croatia proper loosely corresponds to what was termed reliquiae reliquiarum olim magni et inclyti regni Croatiae (the relics of the relics of the formerly great and glorious Kingdom of Croatia) and the subsequent Kingdom of Croatia within the Habsburg monarchy. Central Croatia contains most of the 180 preserved or restored castles and manor houses in Croatia, as it sustained less large-scale war damage in history. Varaždin and Zagreb occupy prominent spots in terms of culture among the region's cities. The west of the region represents a natural barrier between the Adriatic Sea and the Pannonian Basin, and this, along with Ottoman conquest and resulting military frontier status, has contributed to the relatively poor development of the economy and infrastructure of that area.

== Geography ==
Croatia proper is a historical region of Croatia that encompasses territory around Zagreb, located between Slavonia in the east and the Adriatic Sea in the west. Its exact borders are determined ambiguously, and the extent of the region is defined differently by various sources. The border with Slavonia to the east was variously defined throughout history, depending on the political divisions of Croatia.

Modern-day Croatian sources often discuss different kinds of regional division of Croatia, where the historical region of Croatia proper is not typically used, and instead its territory is variously classified under Pannonian Croatia (Croatian: Panonska Hrvatska), Central Croatia (Središnja Hrvatska), Mountainous Croatia (Gorska Hrvatska), Zagreb macroregion (Zagrebačka makroregija), Rijeka macroregion (Riječka makroregija).

Croatia proper roughly corresponds to the area of Zagreb and ten Croatian counties: Bjelovar-Bilogora, Karlovac, Koprivnica-Križevci, Krapina-Zagorje, Lika-Senj, Međimurje, Primorje-Gorski Kotar, Sisak-Moslavina, Varaždin, and Zagreb County.

In the NUTS-2 statistical classification, Međimurje County, Varaždin County, Koprivnica-Križevci County, Krapina-Zagorje County, and Zagreb County make up Northern Croatia, Primorje-Gorski Kotar and Lika-Senj counties are part of Adriatic Croatia, while Bjelovar-Bilogora, Karlovac and Sisak-Moslavina counties are part of the Pannonian Croatia.

The ten counties and Zagreb cover 28,337 square kilometres (10,941 square miles) of land, corresponding to 50% of the territory of Croatia, and have a population of 2,418,214 yielding a population density of 85.3377/km^{2} (221.024/sq mi).

Croatia proper comprises several smaller historical regions of its own: the Croatian Littoral, Lika, Gorski Kotar, Zagorje, Međimurje, Podravina, Posavina, Kordun, Banovina, Prigorje, Turopolje, Moslavina, and Žumberak. The sociogeographical distinction between Central Croatia, the Croatian Littoral and Mountainous Croatia has become more pronounced over time, as the western, mountainous areas of Lika and Gorski Kotar suffered from population depletion during the 20th century, especially during World War II and the Croatian War of Independence. The 2001 census indicated a large proportion of elderly, when 31.5% of population of Lika was over 60 years of age. The Ogulin-Plaški Valley contains the largest settlement of the area, Ogulin, with a population of 8,216. The second-largest settlement in Mountainous Croatia, and the largest in Lika, is Gospić.

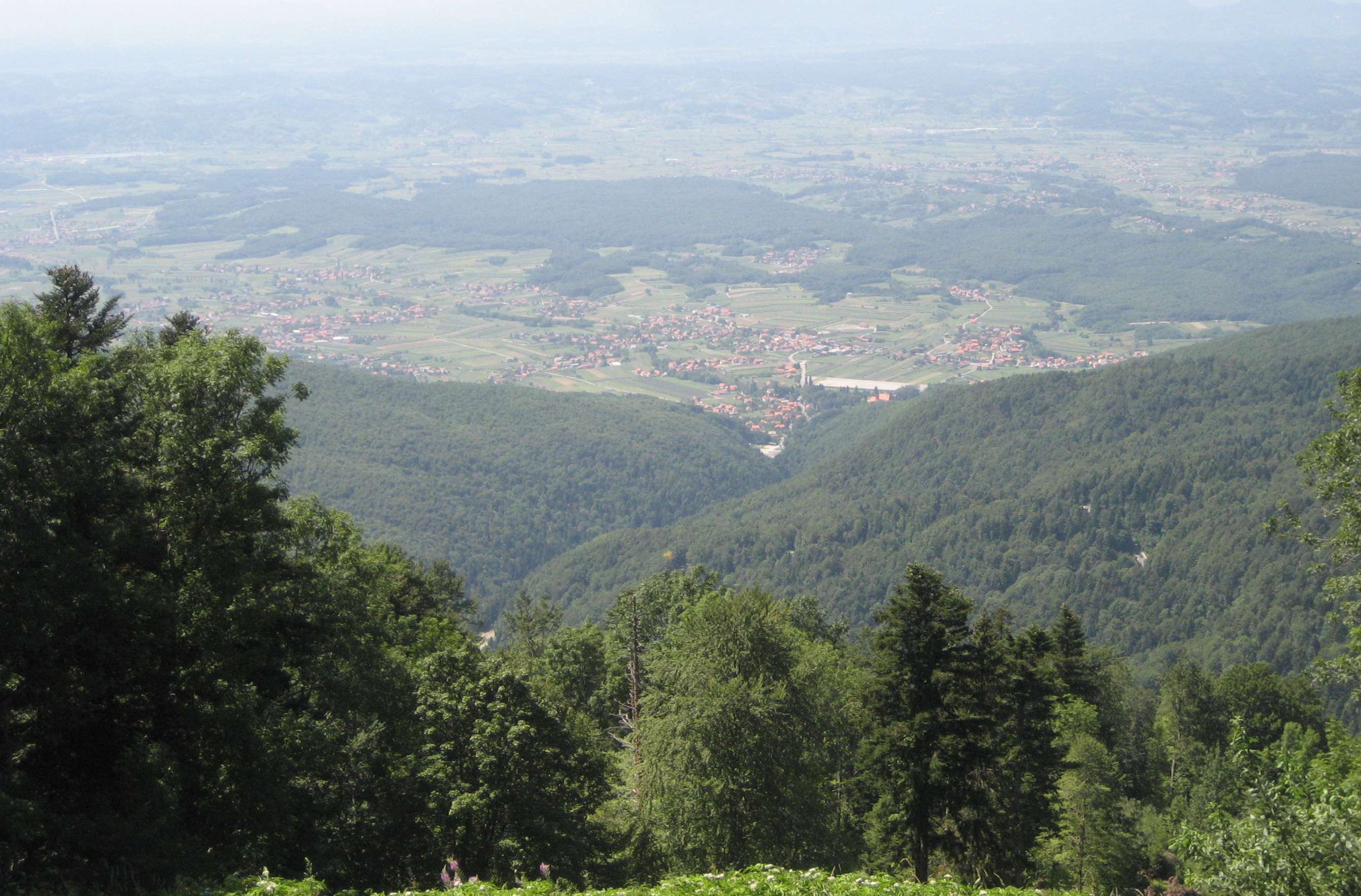
A view of Hrvatsko Zagorje from Medvednica mountain

| County | Seat | Area (km^{2}) | Population |
|---|---|---|---|
| Bjelovar-Bilogora | Bjelovar | 2,640 | 119,743 |
| Karlovac | Karlovac | 3,626 | 128,749 |
| Koprivnica-Križevci | Koprivnica | 1,748 | 115,582 |
| Krapina-Zagorje | Krapina | 1,229 | 133,064 |
| Lika-Senj | Gospić | 5,352 | 50,927 |
| Međimurje | Čakovec | 729 | 114,414 |
| Primorje-Gorski Kotar | Rijeka | 3,582 | 296,195 |
| Sisak-Moslavina | Sisak | 4,468 | 172,977 |
| Varaždin | Varaždin | 1,262 | 176,046 |
| Zagreb | Zagreb | 3,060 | 317,642 |
| City of Zagreb | Zagreb | 641 | 792,875 |
| TOTAL: | | 28,337 | 2,418,214 |
Source: Croatian Bureau of Statistics

=== Topography ===
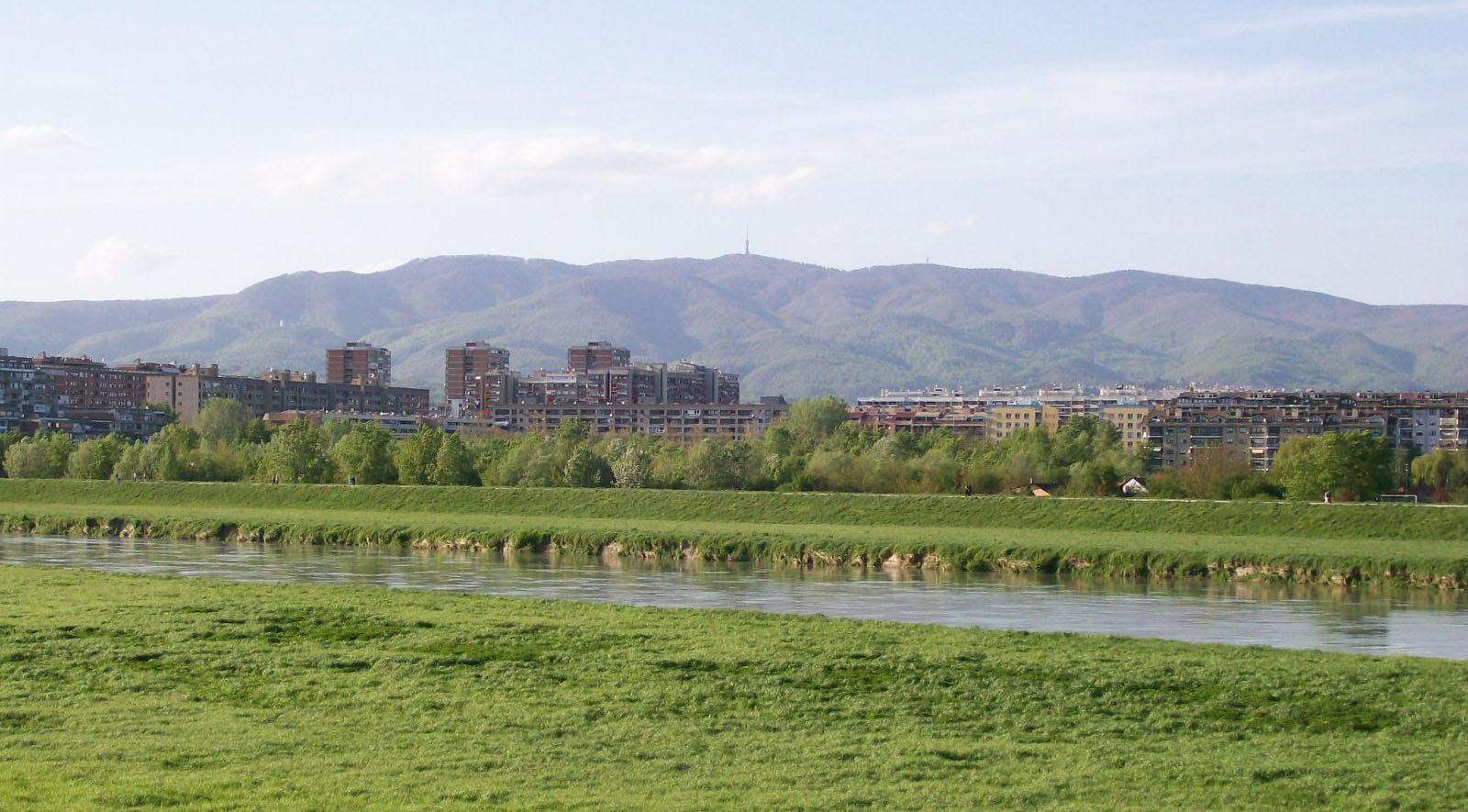
Sava River in Zagreb, with Medvednica in the background

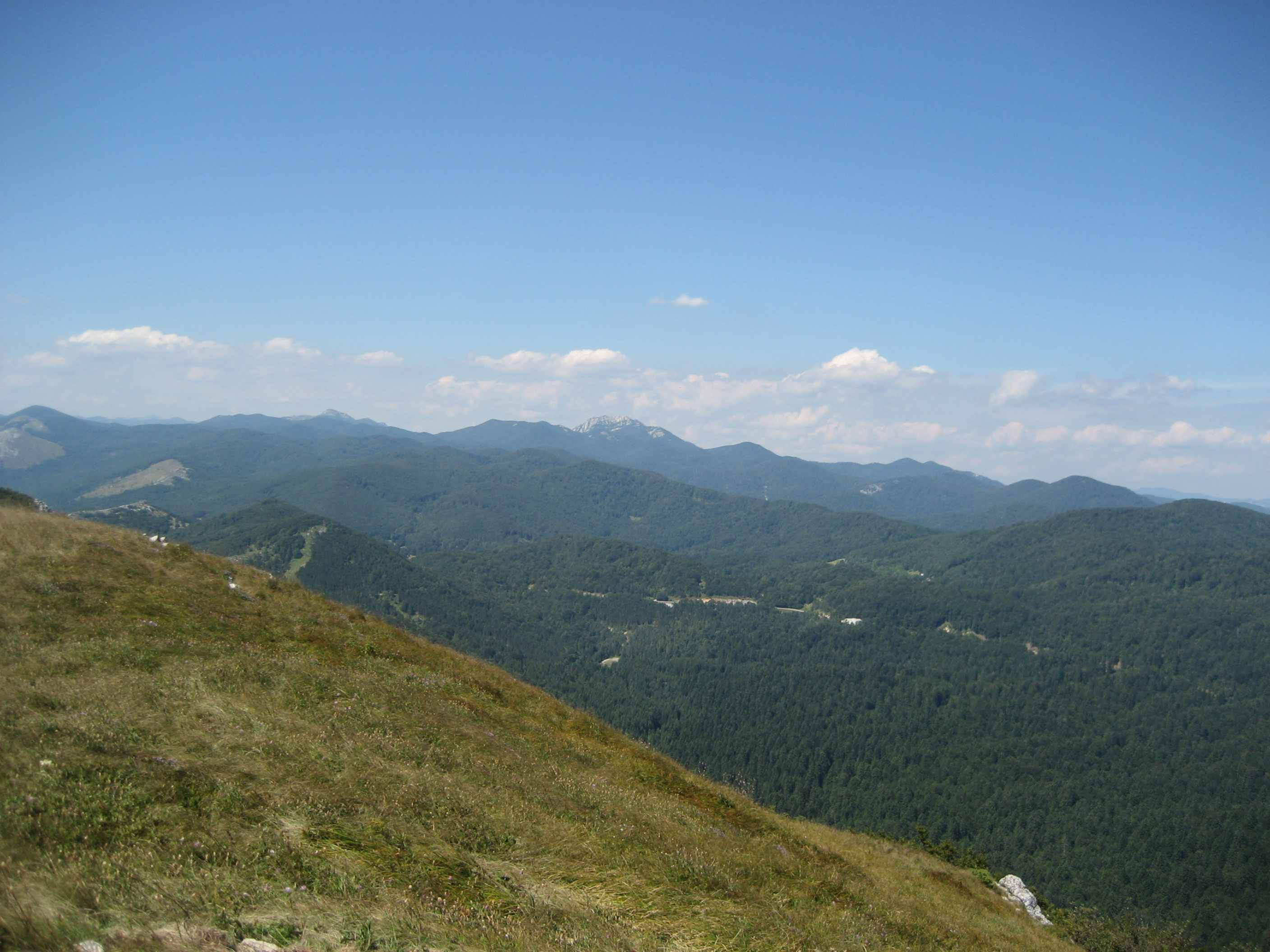
Risnjak Mountain in Gorski Kotar

Croatia proper straddles the boundary between the Dinaric Alps and the Pannonian Basin, two of three major geomorphological parts of Croatia. The boundary runs from the 1,181-metre (3,875 ft) Žumberak range to the Banovina area, along the Sava River. The Dinaric Alps are linked to a fold and thrust belt active from the Late Jurassic to recent times, and is itself part of the Alpine orogeny that extends southeast from the southern Alps. Karst topography is especially prominent in the Dinaric Alps.

The Pannonian Basin took shape through Miocenian thinning and subsidence of crust structures formed during the Late Paleozoic Variscan orogeny. Paleozoic and Mesozoic structures are visible in Papuk and other Slavonian mountains. The processes also led to the formation of a stratovolcanic chain in the basin 12–17 Mya; intensified subsidence was observed until 5 Mya as well as flood basalts at about 7.5 Mya. The contemporary tectonic uplift of the Carpathian Mountains cut off the flow of water to the Black Sea, and the Pannonian Sea formed in the basin. Sediments were transported to the basin from the uplifting Carpathian and Dinaric mountains, with particularly deep fluvial sediments being deposited in the Pleistocene epoch during the formation of the Transdanubian Mountains. Ultimately up to 3,000 metres (9,800 ft) of sediment was deposited in the basin, and the sea eventually drained through the Iron Gate gorge. The result is large plains, particularly in river valleys, and especially along the Sava, Drava, and Kupa rivers. The plains are interspersed with horst and graben structures, believed to have broken the Pannonian Sea's surface as islands. The tallest among these landforms are 1,059-metre (3,474 ft) Ivanščica and 1,035-metre (3,396 ft) Medvednica, north of Zagreb. Parts of 489-metre (1,604 ft) Moslavačka gora, along with igneous landforms on Papuk and Požeška gora mountains in Slavonia to the east, are possibly remnants of a volcanic arc from the same tectonic plate collision that caused the Dinaric Alps.

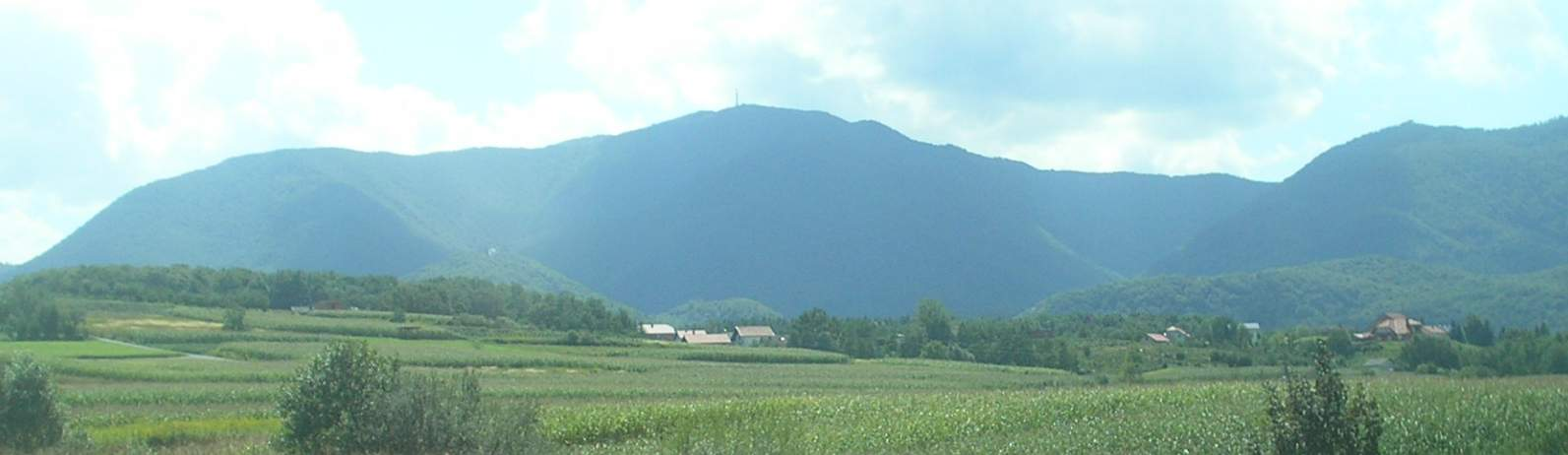
Ivanščica, south of Varaždin

Highest mountains of Croatia proper
| Mountain | Peak | Elevation | Coordinates |
|---|---|---|---|
| Velebit | Vaganski vrh | 1,757 m (5,764 ft) | 44°32′N 15°14′E |
| Plješivica | Ozeblin | 1,657 m (5,436 ft) | 44°47′N 15°45′E |
| Velika Kapela | Bjelolasica-Kula | 1,533 m (5,030 ft) | 45°16′N 14°58′E |
| Risnjak | Risnjak | 1,528 m (5,013 ft) | 45°25′N 14°45′E |
| Snježnik | Snježnik | 1,506 m (4,941 ft) | 45°26′N 14°35′E |
| Žumberak | Sveta Gera | 1,181 m (3,875 ft) | 45°47′N 15°23′E |
| Ivanščica | Ivanščica | 1,059 m (3,474 ft) | 46°11′N 16°6′E |
| Medvednica | Sljeme | 1,035 m (3,396 ft) | 45°55′N 15°58′E |
| Samoborska gora | Japetić | 879 m (2,884 ft) | 45°48′N 15°41′E |
| Strahinščica | Strahinščica | 846 m (2,776 ft) | 46°11′N 15°54′E |
| Plešivica | Plešivica | 777 m (2,549 ft) | 45°44′N 15°40′E |
| Ravna gora (Trakošćan) | Ravna gora | 686 m (2,251 ft) | 46°16′N 15°59′E |
| Kalničko gorje | Kalnik | 642 m (2,106 ft) | 46°8′N 16°28′E |
| Zrinska gora | Piramida | 616 m (2,021 ft) | 45°11′N 16°14′E |
| Vodenica | Vodenica | 537 m (1,762 ft) | 45°36′N 15°25′E |
| Petrova gora | Veliki Petrovac | 512 m (1,680 ft) | 45°14′N 15°48′E |

The region is a part of the Dinaric Alps, linked to a Late Jurassic to recent times fold and thrust belt, itself part of the Alpine orogeny, extending southeast from the southern Alps. The Dinaric Alps in Croatia encompass the entire Gorski Kotar and Lika regions, as well as considerable parts of Dalmatia, with their northeastern edge running from 1,181-metre (3,875 ft) Žumberak to the Banovina region, along the Sava River, and their westernmost landforms being 1,272-metre (4,173 ft) Ćićarija and 1,396-metre (4,580 ft) Učka mountains in Istria. The Mountainous Croatia contains five out of eight mountains in Croatia higher than 1,500 metres (4,900 feet): Velebit, Plješivica, Velika Kapela, Risnjak and Snježnik. Karst topography makes up about half of Croatia and is especially prominent in the Dinaric Alps and in turn, the Mountainous Croatia. There are numerous caves in the Mountainous Croatia. The longest cave in Croatia and in the entire Dinaric Alps, 20,656-metre (67,769 ft) Kita Gaćešina, is located in southern Velebit area of the Mountainous Croatia.

=== Hydrology and climate ===
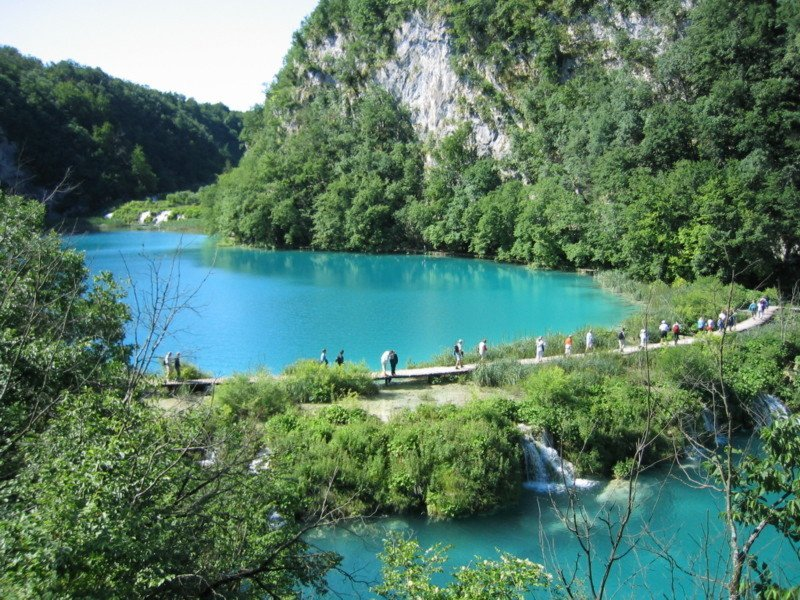
Plitvice Lakes—a World Heritage Site

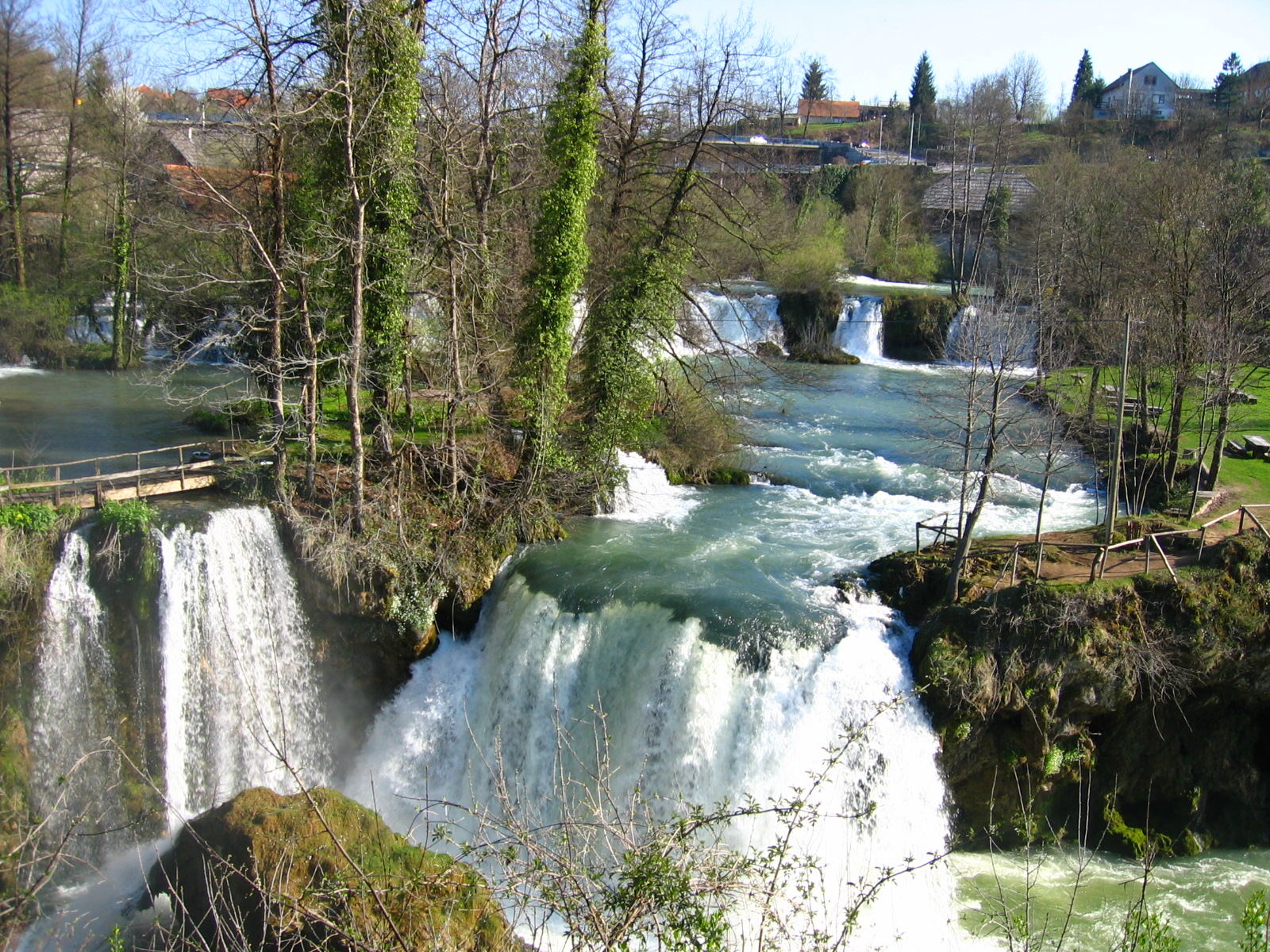
Slunjčica River waterfalls in Rastoke

The vast majority of the region is encompassed by the Black Sea drainage basin. The area includes all the largest rivers flowing in the country—Sava, Drava, Mura, and Kupa—except the Danube. The largest lakes in Croatia proper are 17.1-square-kilometre (6.6 sq mi) Lake Dubrava and 10.1-square-kilometre (3.9 sq mi) Lake Varaždin reservoirs, both near Varaždin, through which the Drava River flows. Croatia proper has a wealth of wetlands. Two out of the four Croatian wetlands included in the Ramsar list of internationally important wetlands are located in the region—Lonjsko Polje along the Sava and Lonja rivers near Sisak, and Crna Mlaka near Jastrebarsko. A high degree of karstification of the terrain in the Dinaric Alps has resulted in an increased permeability of soil and rocks and the formation of travertine barriers and waterfalls. The finest examples of the interaction of watercourses and karst are the Plitvice Lakes, listed as a UNESCO World Heritage Site, and Rastoke, to the north of the Plitvice Lakes.

Lika and Gorski Kotar are marked by several significant rivers draining north towards the Pannonian Basin. Those are the Kupa, tracing the northern boundary of the region, Dobra, Mrežnica and the Korana—forming travertine barriers and waterfalls before discharging into Kupa in area of Karlovac, as well as Una, in the eastern part of the region, at the border of Bosnia and Herzegovina. Furthermore, there are losing streams such as Gacka, Krbava and Lika rivers, reflecting a high degree of karstification of the terrain in the region, resulting in increased permeability of soil and rocks. Ingress of water underground resulted in formation of subterranean watercourses and lakes. Probably the finest example of interaction of karst terrain and watercourses in the area are Plitvice Lakes—16 interlinked lakes between Mala Kapela and Plješevica, through which Korana River flows. The area is abundant in travertine barriers, waterfalls and caves of biological origin—created through deposition of calcium carbonate through agency of moss, algae and aquatic bacteria. The Plitvice Lakes are listed as a UNESCO World Heritage Site, and they are a part of one of three Croatia's national parks located in the Mountainous Croatia, along with Risnjak and Sjeverni Velebit.

Croatia proper has a moderately warm and rainy continental climate (Dfb) as defined by the Köppen climate classification. Mean monthly temperatures range between −3 °C (27 °F) (in January) and 18 °C (64 °F) (in July). Temperature peaks are pronounced in the region compared to parts of Croatia closer to the Adriatic Sea, because of the absence of its moderating effect. The lowest temperature of −35.5 °C (−31.9 °F) was recorded on 3 February 1919 in Čakovec, and the highest temperature of 42.4 °C (108.3 °F) was recorded on 5 July 1950 in Karlovac. Gorski Kotar and Lika represent the coldest parts of Croatia as mean annual temperature there ranges between 8 and 10 °C (46 and 50 °F) at lower elevations and 2 and 4 °C (36 and 39 °F) at greater elevations. Gorski Kotar mountain peaks of Risnjak and Snježnik receive the greatest precipitation in Croatia—3,500 millimetres (140 inches) per year. Overall, the region has no arid periods of the year. Gorski Kotar also receives the least sunlight—1,700 hours per year on average.

=== Demographics ===
Historical population
| Year | Pop. | ±% |
|---|---|---|
| 1857 | 1,273,611 | — |
| 1869 | 1,388,343 | +9.0% |
| 1880 | 1,439,400 | +3.7% |
| 1890 | 1,643,880 | +14.2% |
| 1900 | 1,812,257 | +10.2% |
| 1910 | 1,955,937 | +7.9% |
| 1921 | 1,945,200 | −0.5% |
| 1931 | 2,150,941 | +10.6% |
| 1948 | 2,144,103 | −0.3% |
| 1953 | 2,218,578 | +3.5% |
| 1961 | 2,318,101 | +4.5% |
| 1971 | 2,466,475 | +6.4% |
| 1981 | 2,571,920 | +4.3% |
| 1991 | 2,645,360 | +2.9% |
| 2001 | 2,482,298 | −6.2% |
| 2011 | 2,418,768 | −2.6% |
| 2021 | 2,224,623 | −8.0% |
Source: Croatian Bureau of Statistics publications^{2}

According to the 2011 census, the total population of the ten counties of Croatia proper, together with that of the city of Zagreb, is 2,418,214—representing 56.4% of the population of Croatia. The largest proportion of the total population lives in the city of Zagreb, followed by Zagreb County. Lika-Senj County is the least populous county of Croatia proper. The population density of the counties ranges from 156.9 to 9.5 persons per square kilometre, with the highest density recorded in Međimurje County and the lowest in Lika-Senj County. The highest population density is recorded in the city of Zagreb area, at 1,236.9 persons per square kilometre. Zagreb is the largest city in Croatia proper, followed by Rijeka, Karlovac, Varaždin, Sisak, and Velika Gorica. Other cities in Croatia proper have populations below 30,000. According to the 2001 census, Croats account for 92.0 percent of population of the region, and the most significant ethnic minority are Serbs, comprising 3.4 percent of the population. The largest proportion of the Serb minority was recorded in the Sisak-Moslavina and Karlovac counties (11.7 percent and 11.0 percent respectively), while a significant Czech minority was observed in Bjelovar-Bilogora County, comprising 5.3 percent of population of the county.

The most populous urban areas in Croatia proper
| Rank | City | County | Urban population | Municipal population |
|---|---|---|---|---|
| 1 | Zagreb | City of Zagreb | 686,568 | 792,875 |
| 2 | Rijeka | Primorje-Gorski Kotar | 128,624 | 213,666 |
| 3 | Karlovac | Karlovac | 46,827 | 55,981 |
| 4 | Varaždin | Varaždin | 38,746 | 47,055 |
| 5 | Sisak | Sisak-Moslavina | 33,049 | 47,699 |
| 6 | Velika Gorica | Zagreb | 31,341 | 63,511 |
| 7 | Bjelovar | Bjelovar-Bilogora | 27,099 | 40,443 |
| 8 | Koprivnica | Koprivnica-Križevci | 23,896 | 30,872 |
| 9 | Zaprešić | Zagreb | 19,574 | 25,226 |
| 10 | Samobor | Zagreb | 15,867 | 37,607 |

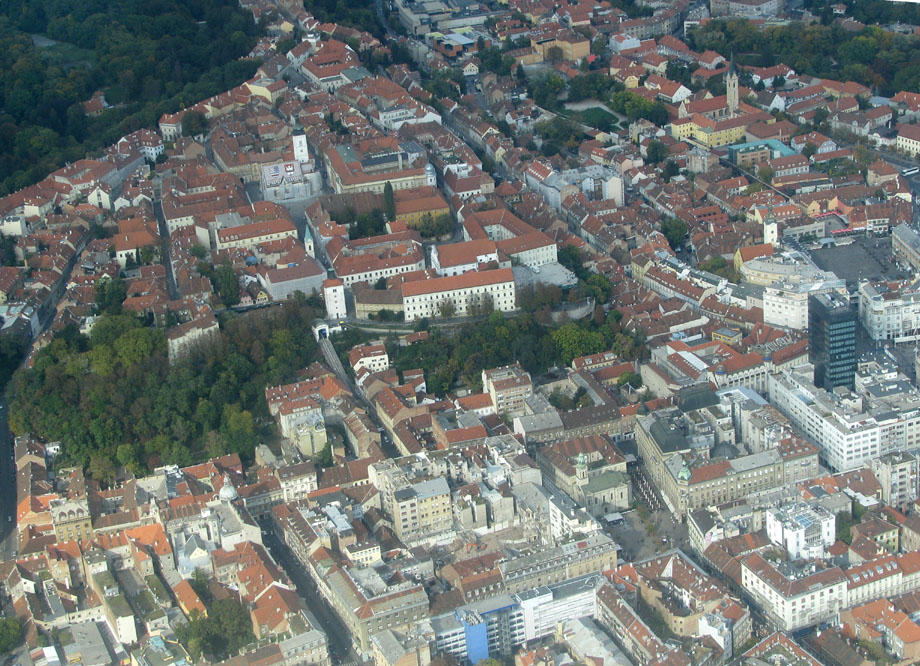
Zagreb

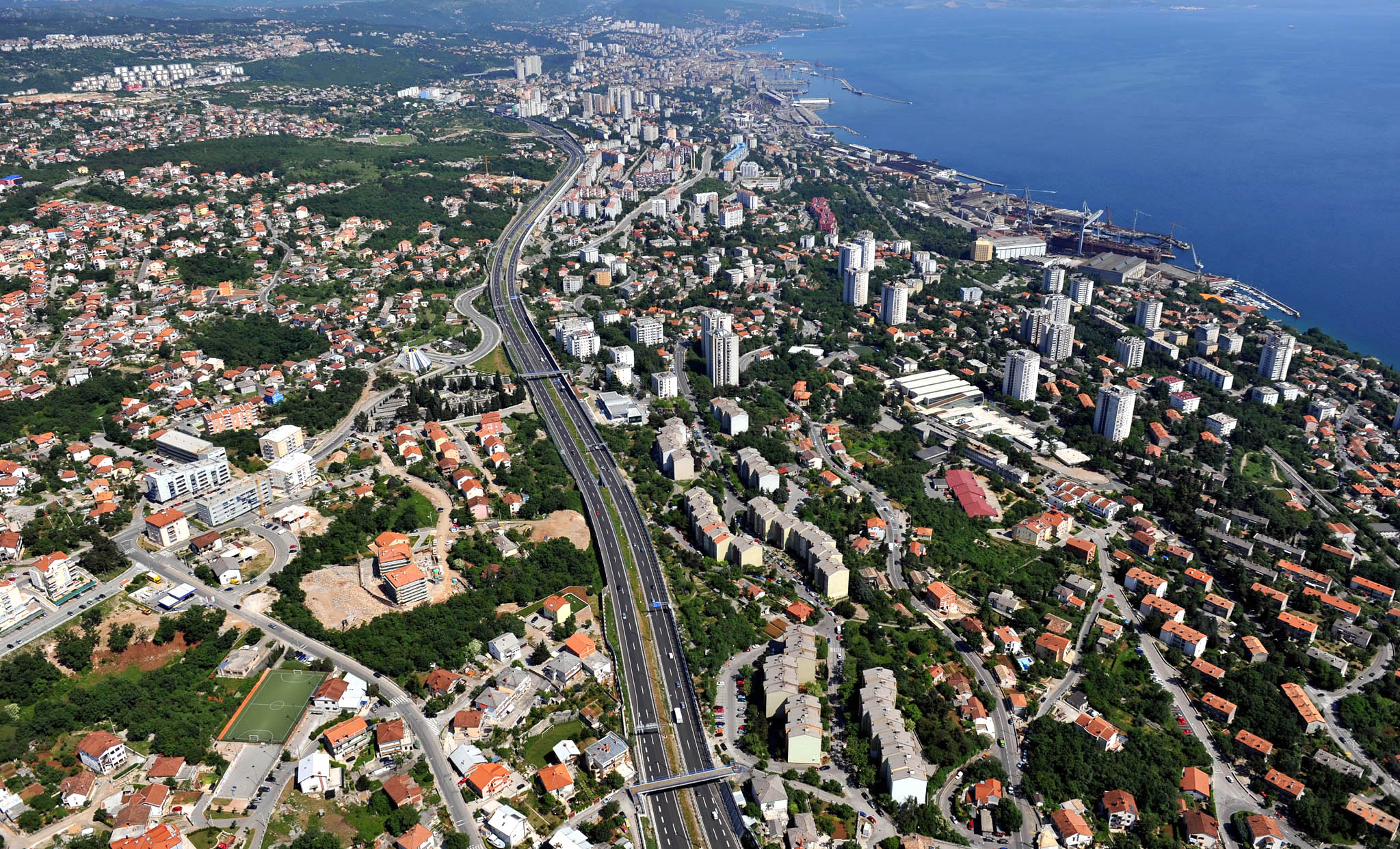
Rijeka

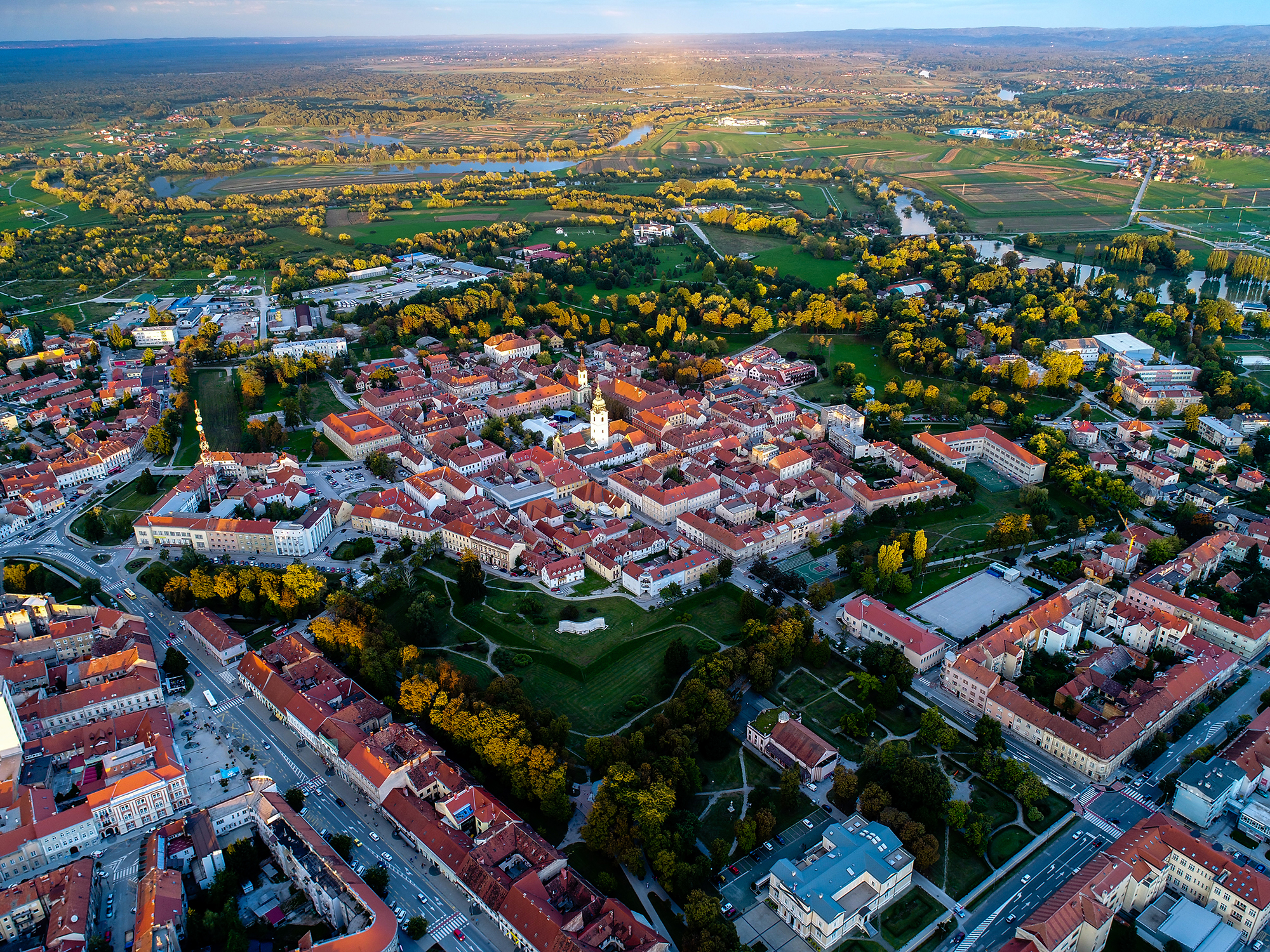
Karlovac

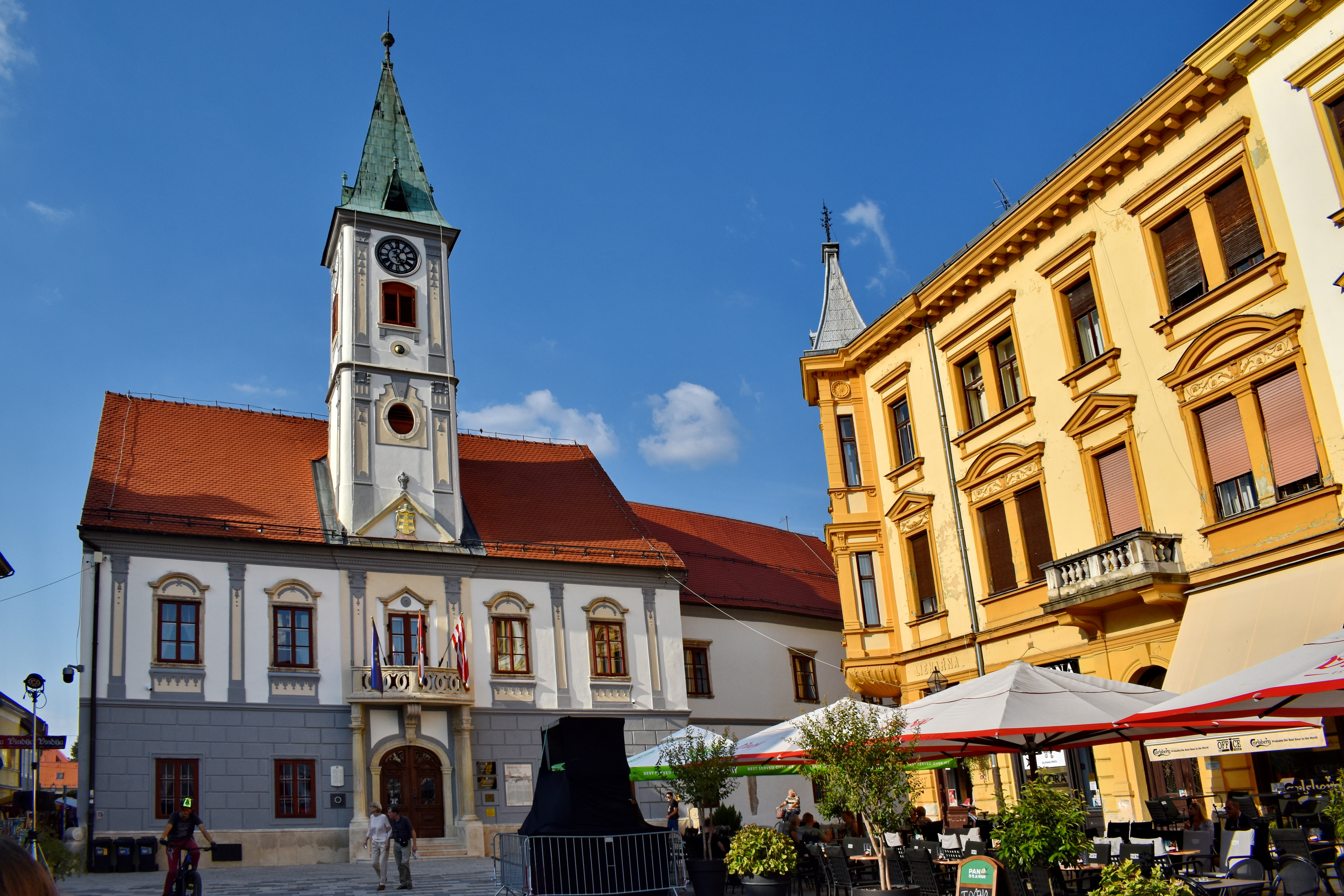
Varaždin

== Economy ==
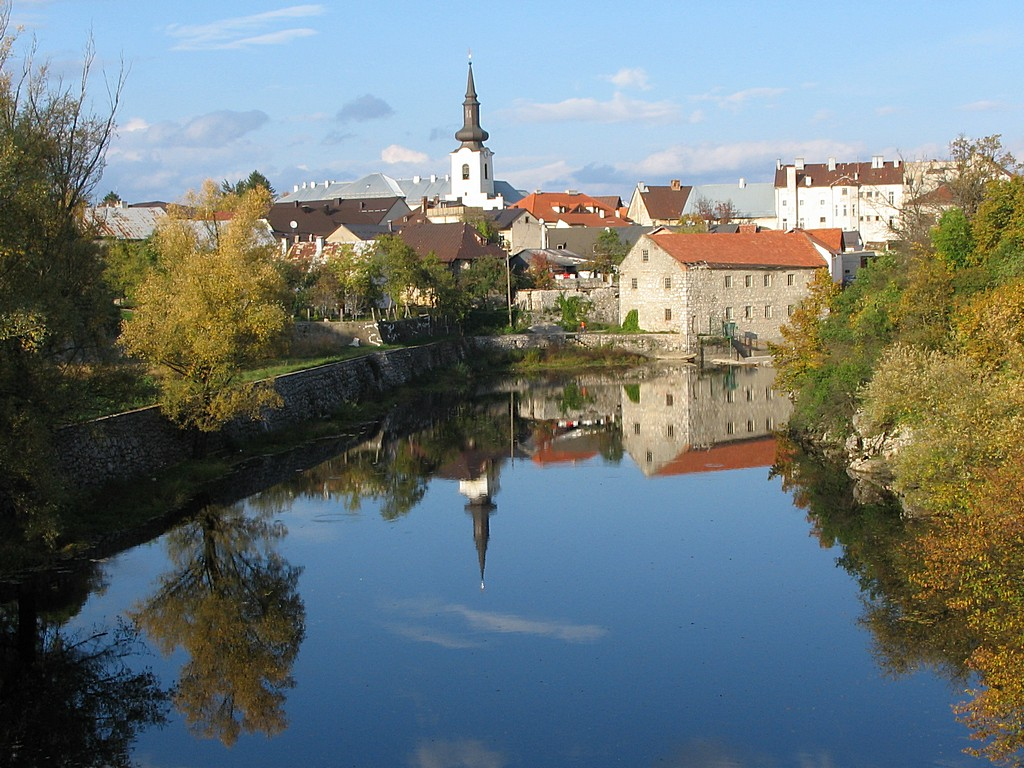
Gospić, the largest town in Lika

The lowland regions of Croatia proper are the most significant economic area of Croatia in terms of its contribution to the national gross domestic product (GDP). The city of Zagreb alone contributes 34.3 % of Croatia's GDP, followed by Primorje-Gorski Kotar, Zagreb and Varaždin counties contributing 8.3, 5.9 and 3.6 percent of the nation's GDP respectively. The area contributes 65.5 percent of Croatia's GDP and has an average GDP per capita of 14,414 euros—17.5 percent above the national average.

The economy of the city of Zagreb represents the bulk of the economy of Croatia proper. Its most significant components are wholesale and retail trade, accounting for 38.1% of the city's economic income, followed by the processing industry, encompassing 20.3% of the economy of Zagreb. Further industries, by income share, are the energy industry—the supply of electric power, natural gas, steam, and air conditioning (7.8%); information and communications (7.2%); civil engineering (5.4%), professional technical and scientific services (4.6%); financial services (4.5%); and transport and storage services (3.9%). These account for 91.8% of the total income of the city's economy. Small businesses generate 22% of the total income; 14.4% is attributed to medium enterprises and the rest to large companies. The economy of Zagreb County, largely contiguous with Zagreb's metropolitan area, is dominated by wholesale and retail trade (53.5% of total income) and the processing industry (25.7%), followed by transport (6.1%) and civil engineering (5.3%). Unlike the economy of the city of Zagreb, the county's economic income is largely generated by small and medium businesses (64.6%). The city of Zagreb and Zagreb County dominate the economy of the Croatia proper and Croatia as a whole: nearly 91% of all Croatia's wholesale and retail trade companies and 45% of the Croatian processing industry is headquartered there.

In 2020, largest companies headquartered in the Croatia proper by income among were INA, Konzum plus (a part of Fortenova Grupa corporate group) and Hrvatska elektroprivreda — all of them headquartered in Zagreb.

The largest company by income in Zagreb County is 5th-ranked Lidl Hrvatska, while the 8th-ranked retail chain Plodine is the largest company in Primorje-Gorski Kotar County.The largest company by income in Varaždin County is the 22nd-ranked food processing industry company Vindija, while the 31st-ranked also food processing industry company Podravka, based in Koprivnica, is the largest company in Koprivnica-Križevci County.The 41st-ranked petrochemical plant Petrokemija, based in Kutina is the largest company in Sisak-Moslavina County, while the 57th-ranked PPK Karlovac a meat processing company headquartered in Karlovac is the largest company in Karlovac County.The 106th-ranked glass-packaging producing company Vetropack Straža is the largest company in Krapina-Zagorje County, while the 168th-ranked meat processing company headquartered in Čakovec is the largest company in Međimurje County.The largest company in Lika-Senj County is 237th-ranked Calcit Lika.

| County | GDP | | GDP per capita | |
| County | million € | Index (Croatia=100) | € | Index (Croatia=100) |
|---|---|---|---|---|
| Bjelovar-Bilogora | 925 | 1.8 | 7,986 | 65.1 |
| Karlovac | 1,035 | 2.0 | 8,301 | 67.7 |
| Koprivnica-Križevci | 979 | 1.9 | 8,711 | 71.0 |
| Krapina-Zagorje | 1,021 | 2.0 | 7,919 | 64.5 |
| Lika-Senj | 436 | 0.9 | 8,878 | 72.4 |
| Međimurje | 1,142 | 2.2 | 10,302 | 84.0 |
| Primorje-Gorski Kotar | 4,270 | 8.3 | 14,797 | 120.6 |
| Sisak-Moslavina | 1,309 | 2.6 | 7,868 | 64.1 |
| Varaždin | 1,865 | 3.6 | 10.899 | 88.8 |
| Zagreb | 3,011 | 5.9 | 9,710 | 79.1 |
| City of Zagreb | 17,544 | 30.9 | 22,695 | 185.0 |
| TOTAL: | 33,537 | 65.5 | 14,414 | 117.5 |
Source: Croatian Bureau of Statistics (2018 data)

In contrast, the regions of Lika and Gorski Kotar are the least developed area of the region and the country in general. The main source of income in the area was forestry, farming and animal husbandry. Forests represent a development potential of the area as 45% of Lika and as much as 83% of Gorski Kotar is forested. Industrialisation of the region started after the World War II, with a particular emphasis on development of wood processing industry in Gorski Kotar and other industries elsewhere in the region, but it did not create sufficient jobs to prevent economic migrations. Furthermore, the economic structure of the area sustained great downturn in the 1990s during the Croatian War of Independence. Since the 2000s, an increasing prominence is given to tourism sector, especially rural tourism.

=== Infrastructure ===
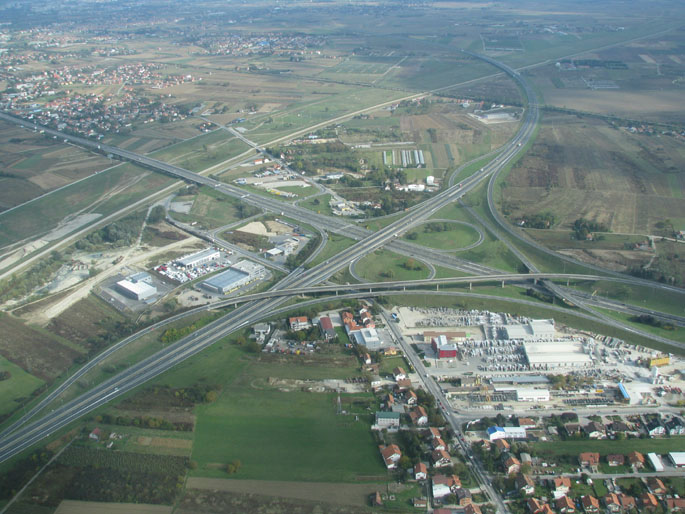
Lučko interchange—junction of two Pan-European corridors in Zagreb

Three Pan-European transport corridors and corridor branches run through Croatia proper. The corridor Vb encompasses the A4 motorway, spanning from Zagreb to Varaždin and the border of Hungary, and a section of the A1 and A6 motorways, extending south of Zagreb towards Karlovac and Rijeka. The transport corridor also contains a parallel railway line connecting the Port of Rijeka and Budapest via Zagreb. The second major transport route is the corridor X, represented as the A3 motorway and a double-track railway spanning the region from west to east, as well as the A2 motorway—the Xa branch of the corridor X. The three routes form junctions near Zagreb.

The region is also home to the largest airport in Croatia—the Zagreb Airport. In April 2012, a 30-year concession contract to develop and manage the airport as a regional transport centre was signed by the Government of Croatia and Zagreb Airport International Company Limited. The only navigable river in the region is the Sava, downstream of Sisak. The navigable route became disused after onset of the Croatian War of Independence in 1991, and it has not been fully restored since the end of the war, limiting the size of vessels that may reach Sisak.

Pipeline transport infrastructure in the region comprises the Jadranski naftovod (JANAF) pipeline, connecting the Sisak and Virje crude oil storage facilities and terminals to a terminal in Slavonski Brod further east on the Sava River, and the Omišalj oil terminal—a part of the Port of Rijeka. The JANAF system also includes a petroleum derivatives pipeline to a fuel handling terminal in Zagreb. The region forms a center of Croatia's natural gas supply system, based on an underground storage facility located approximately 50 kilometres (31 miles) east of Zagreb.

The Dinaric mountain ranges of Lika and Gorski Kotar in the region's western reaches represent a natural barrier between the Adriatic Sea to its west and the Pannonian Basin and to its east, traversed by few high-performance transport routes until recently. The region was first spanned by a trading route between Senj and Pannonia in classical antiquity and later in Middle Ages, but the first modern road in the area was the Caroline road, completed in 1732 connecting Rijeka and Karlovac via Fužine, Mrkopalj, Ravna Gora and Vrbovsko, and named after Charles VI who ordered its construction. The same emperor commissioned construction of a narrow road between Karlobag and Gospić—the first to span Velebit. Those first roads were replaced by the more modern Josephina connecting Karlovac to Senj, largely tracing the Roman trading route across the Vratnik pass, and the Theresiana following a different route between Karlobag and Gospić, completed in 1779 and 1784 respectively. In 1789, a road to Dalmatia, branching from the Josephine road at Žuta Lokva towards Gračac via Gospić. Louisiana road was completed in 1809, also running between Rijeka and Karlovac, although via Delnice. The first railway built in the region was the Zagreb – Rijeka railway, completed in 1875. Since the 2000s, the region is spanned by modern motorways.

== Culture ==
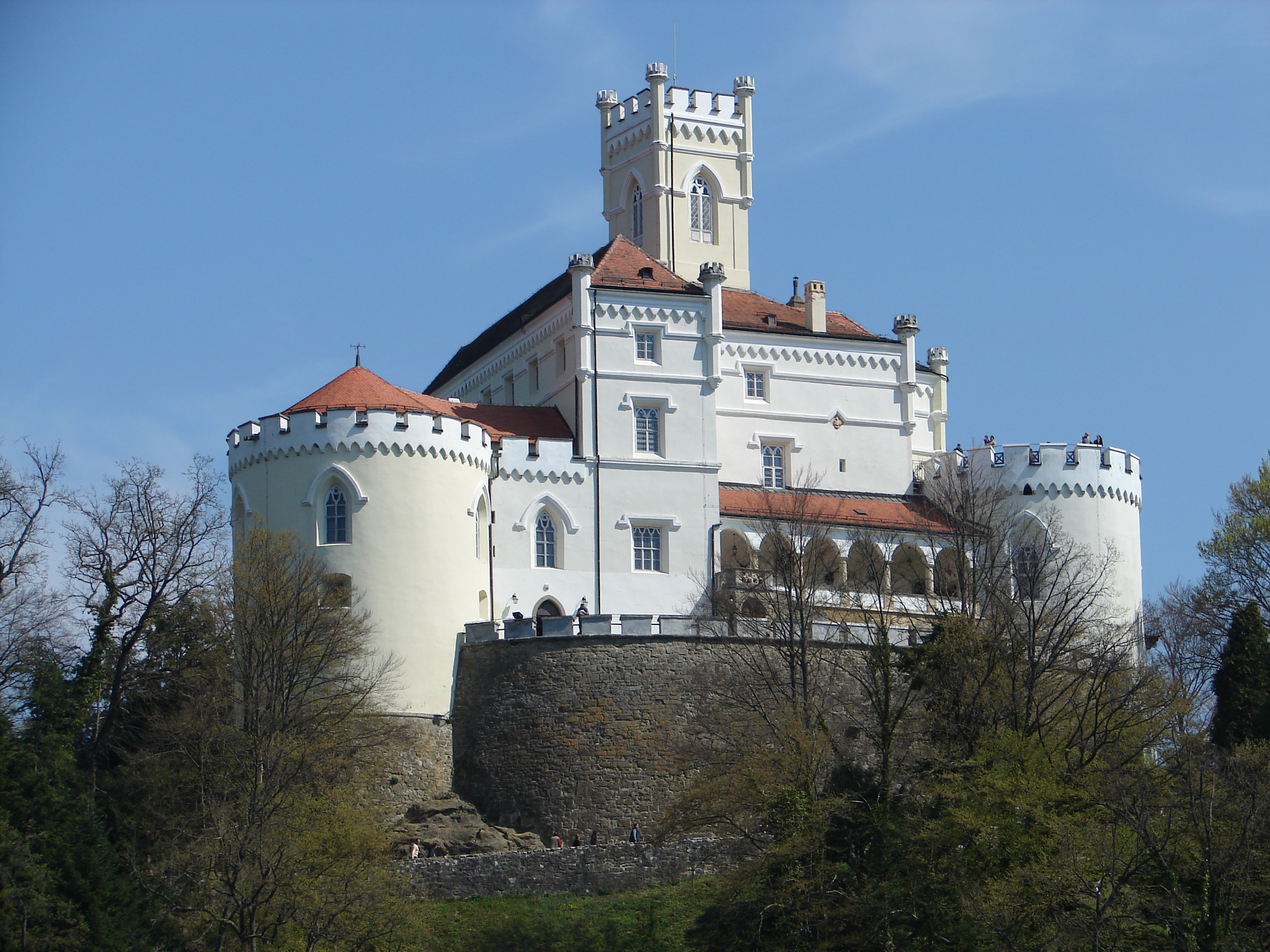
Trakošćan Castle located north of Krapina

Most of Central Croatia is distinguished in Croatia by its relatively high population density – a consequence of the fact that the region was largely spared from large-scale war damage. This also allowed preservation of numerous cultural heritage sites, including medieval city cores, hill forts, manor houses, castles, palaces, and churches. Because the medieval Kingdom of Croatia was governed by rulers based further south, in areas closer to the Adriatic Sea coast, there are few Early and High Middle Ages monuments preserved in the region—most of them date back to the Late Middle Ages and later periods. There are, however, archaeological sites with features from prehistory and classical antiquity. The most significant prehistoric site in the region is a Homo neanderthalensis site discovered in Krapina.

The region contains most of the 180 preserved or restored castles and manor houses in Croatia—most of the best preserved-ones were built in the 17th and 18th centuries, when the Ottoman conquest was no longer a threat. A substantial number of buildings were destroyed in the Second World War. The largest number of preserved castles and manor houses are situated in Hrvatsko Zagorje, including the Trakošćan Castle—the most beautiful castle in Croatia. Its construction started in the 14th century, and it has been substantially expanded and rebuilt since. Another example is the Veliki Tabor Castle—the best-preserved medieval castle in Croatia—completed in the second half of the 15th century.

Among the cities in the region, Varaždin and Zagreb occupy particularly prominent places in terms of culture. Varaždin is often considered the most significant centre of baroque culture and heritage in Croatia. That claim is reflected in the city's historical architecture and cultural events, based on traditions of the city from the era. Zagreb, on the other hand, is the largest cultural centre, not only in the region, but also in Croatia as a whole. It is home to dozens of galleries, museums, and theatres as well as being the site of numerous landmarks. The landmarks include the Zagreb Cathedral, founded in 1093 and rebuilt numerous times since, the last major reconstruction being after the 1880 earthquake. The cathedral is the tallest structure in Croatia. Zagreb is the most significant centre of scientific work and education in the region and the entire country. It is the site of the University of Zagreb—the oldest place of higher education in Croatia and Southeast Europe, operating continuously since 1669. It is also home to the Ruđer Bošković Institute—the leading Croatia's scientific research institute—and to the Croatian Academy of Sciences and Arts.

== History ==
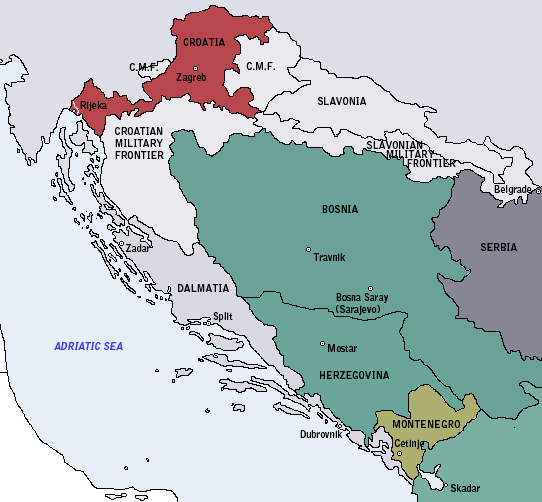
Kingdom of Croatia in 1867

Croatia proper as a region has defined itself historically through territorial losses of the medieval Kingdom of Croatia to the Republic of Venice and Ottoman conquest starting in the 15th century. Modern history recorded the first Ottoman raids in the area in the late 15th century after fall of the Medieval Kingdom of Bosnia—culminating in the Battle of Krbava Field in 1493. The region now known as Croatia proper only became so in 1522, when the capital of Croatia was moved from Dalmatia to Bihać. In response, Croatian Military Frontier was established under direct Habsburg imperial rule. By 1528, nearly all of Lika was under Ottoman control. Venice seized the area of present-day Dalmatia as the Ottomans advanced, winning the decisive Battle of Krbava Field in 1493 and the Battle of Mohács in 1526. This led to the loss of Slavonia and the defeat of the Kingdom of Hungary, to which Croatia was tied through a personal union. The extent of the Ottoman conquest still marks the southern and eastern boundaries of Croatia proper as a geographical region. In effect, Croatia proper loosely corresponds to what was termed the relics of the relics of the formerly great and glorious Kingdom of Croatia (Latin: reliquiae reliquiarum olim magni et inclyti regni Croatiae) and subsequent Kingdom of Croatia within the Habsburg Empire. The Croatian Military Frontier was gradually established in the second half of the 16th century, removing further territory from the Kingdom of Croatia and placing the military zone under direct imperial rule. Ottoman advances into Croatian territory continued until the 1593 Battle of Sisak, the first decisive Ottoman defeat, which led to a more lasting stabilisation of the frontier. As the Ottoman control of the area waned, the Military Frontier expanded to include the entirety of Lika. In 1881, that region was incorporated into the Kingdom of Croatia-Slavonia, together with Gorski Kotar, which remained a part of the Kingdom of Croatia throughout the Croatian–Ottoman Wars.

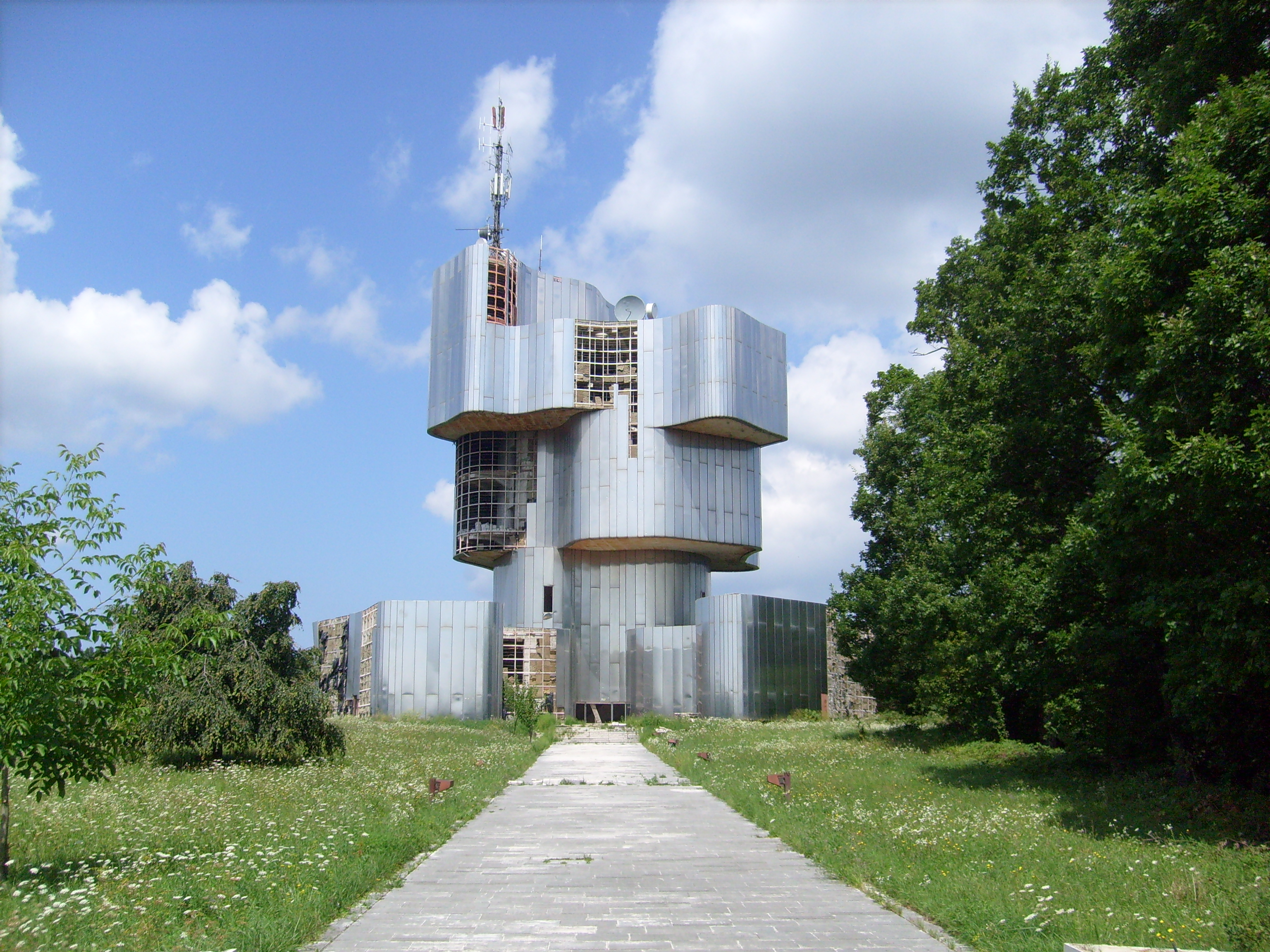
Monument to the uprising of the people of Kordun and Banija

After the Ottoman defeat in the Great Turkish War and the Treaty of Karlowitz (1699), a separate Kingdom of Slavonia was formed out of the regained territories, confirming the established borders of the Kingdom of Croatia. Pursuant to provisions of the Croatian–Hungarian Settlement of 1868, Slavionia was added to the Kingdom of Croatia-Slavonia—the territory ruled from Zagreb—and the military frontier was abolished. Rijeka was removed from the new kingdom, as the Corpus separatum attached it to Hungary instead. Following World War I and the Treaty of Trianon, Hungary lost Rijeka and Međimurje, as well as other territories, to the newly established Kingdom of Serbs, Croats and Slovenes. The 1921 constitution defined the country as a unitary state and abolished the historical administrative divisions, effectively ending Croatia's autonomy. Međimurje was assigned to Croatia in 1947—when all the borders of the former Yugoslav constituent republics were defined by demarcation commissions, pursuant to decisions of the AVNOJ of 1943 and 1945.

After the break-up of Yugoslavia and Croatia's declaration of independence in 1991, the Republic of Serbian Krajina (RSK) was proclaimed in parts of Croatia, including parts of the Croatia—Banovina and Kordun—encompassing areas east of Karlovac and south of Sisak, marking the start of the Croatian War of Independence. After the January 1992 ceasefire, a United Nations peacekeeping force was deployed to the area. The area remained outside control of the government of Croatia until August 1995, when it was recaptured in Operation Storm. The Croatian Army campaign ended following the surrender of the last operational corps of the RSK military in Viduševac, near Glina. After the war, a number of towns and municipalities in the region were designated Areas of Special State Concern.

== See also ==
- Civil Croatia
- Kajkavian
- Northern Croatia
