= Russians of Croatia =

Ethnic group in Croatia

Total population
- 1,481

Regions with significant populations
- Zagreb: 380
- Split-Dalmatia: 211
- Istria: 186
- Primorje-Gorski Kotar: 153
- Međimurje: 118
- Zagreb County: 100

Languages
- Croatian, Russian

Religion
- Russian Orthodox Church

Related ethnic groups
- Ukrainians, Rusyns

Russians of Croatia (Croatian: Rusi u Hrvatskoj, Russian: Русские в Хорватии, romanized: Russkie v Khorvatii) are one of the twenty-two national minorities expressly mentioned and defined by law of Croatia. According to the 2021 Census, there were 1,481 Croatian citizens in the country, who identified themselves as Russians, most of them living in Zagreb (380).

== Statistics ==
Official name of Croatia	Year	Number
-	1931	9,831^{1}
PR Croatia	1948	3,210
PR Croatia	1953	2,138
PR Croatia	1961	3,311
SR Croatia	1971	1,240
SR Croatia	1981	758
Republic of Croatia	1991	706
Republic of Croatia	2001	906
Republic of Croatia	2011	1,279
Republic of Croatia	2021	1,481
^1 Russians and Ukrainians were considered one group in 1931 Census (Central Bureau of Statistics)

== History and legal status ==
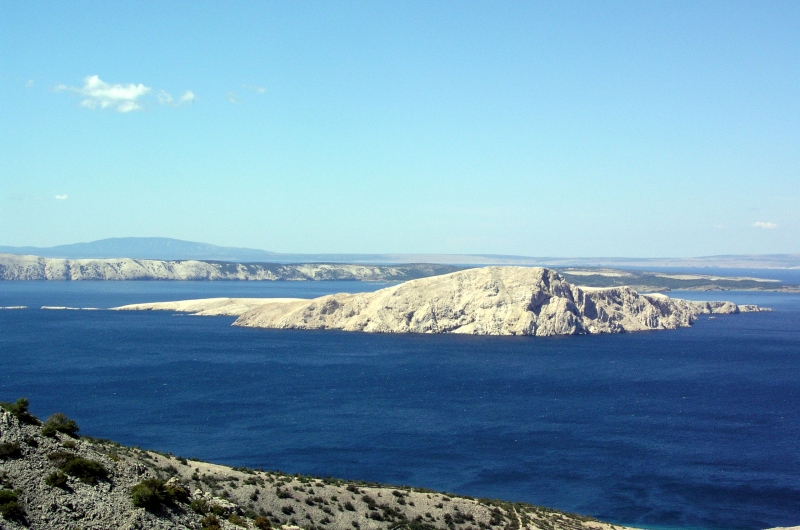
Goli otok, an uninhabited island in the northern Adriatic Sea, where Russian PoWs were jailed during WWI

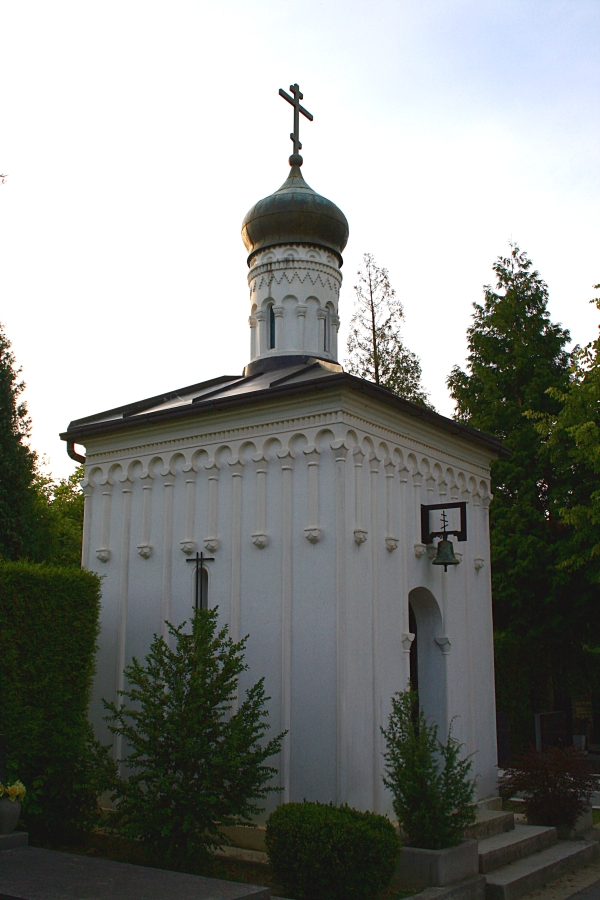
The Resurrection of Christ chapel in the Mirogoj Cemetery in Zagreb, built in 1928, architect Andrey Shavtsov

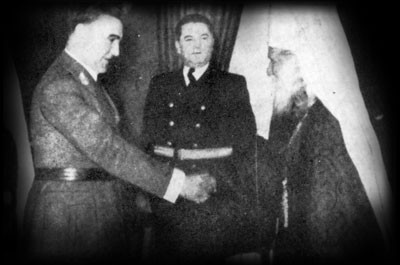
NDH′s Poglavnik Ante Pavelić, minister Andrija Artuković and Germogen (Maximov), head of the Croatian Orthodox Church (1942)

A significant number of Russian nationals were first brought to the territory of modern Croatia, then a part of the Austro-Hungarian Empire, as prisoners of war during the First World War; some of them remained there after the war ended in 1918. In 1920, there began mass immigration of refugees fleeing the Soviet-controlled Russia to the Kingdom of Serbs, Croats and Slovenes; some of those people settled in what is now Croatia, first mainly in Dubrovnik and Split, later in Zagreb and elsewhere. The government of the Kingdom of SHS in early 1920 established the State Commission for Russian Refugees at the Ministry of Foreign Affairs (that category then included all arrivals from the former Russian Empire irrespective of their actual ethnicity). But even before that, the government had appointed a special official who was charged with reception and accommodation of arrivals from Russia; the position was given to Sergei Nikolayevich Paleolog, a former senior official in the Russian Ministry of the Interior. Major Russian communities (″colonies″) were established in Dubrovnik, Split, Crikvenica, Zagreb, and some other towns in the early 1920s, while the majority of those arriving in the Kingdom eventually settled in Serbia. The government of the Kingdom of SHS explained its hospitality afforded to Russian exiles by presenting it as paying back the debt Serbia owed Russia for the latter′s intervention on the side of Serbia at the outbreak of World War I.

The first large group of mostly wealthy Russians arrived in Dubrovnik in March 1920 and some of those went further west. Russians arriving in Dubrovnik as refugees were sent on to Vojvodina, whereas those who arrived in Bakar (since December 1920) were mostly settled all over Croatia. Multiple Russian clubs, associations, as well as cultural, educational, political and professional institutions were founded in Zagreb. The Russian All-Military Union, an organisation set up by Gen Pyotr Wrangel in Karlovci in September 1924 that sought to embrace all the veterans of the Imperial Russian Armed Forces the world over, had an office in Zagreb. Zagreb′s Russian colony was in 1924 headed up by Stepan Stanislavovich Skovronsky and totaled about 2,000 members. For academic year 1922/1923, the University of Zagreb enrolled 232 students from Russia (10.10 percent of all those enrolled). According to the Kingdom′s Ministry of the Interior′s documents, the local population occasionally displayed hostility towards Russian refugees, usually due to the view that Russians were taking away jobs, but also due to the fact that the left-leaning strata of society tended to see all Russian émigrés as "counter revolutionists". In 1921, a Russian religious community was founded in Zagreb by admiral Vyatkin who chaired it until his death in 1943.

In Crikvenica, an Orthodox church of St Nicholas was built in 1923–1924 specifically for Russian worshippers and survives as a building. There is also a ″Russian″ chapel in Zagreb′s Mirogoj cemetery, which was consecrated on 4 November 1928. Those were erected by White Russian exiles, mainly former Russian Imperial Army officers and intelligentsia, who had fled Russia and moved to what was then the Kingdom of Serbs, Croats and Slovenes, as part of a massive Russian exodus that resulted from the Russian Revolution in 1917 and the ensuing Civil War. Most of those refugees from the former Russian Empire did not initially intend to stay outside Russia permanently and hoped to return.

Notable figures of the interwar period include: Margarita Froman, a principal dancer and choreographer of the Croatian National Theatre in Zagreb; generals Alexander Adlerberg, Daniil Dratsenko and Ivan Polyakov, who consecutively headed the Zagreb chapter of the Russian All-Military Union (ROVS); counter admiral Fyodor Vyatkin (Vjatkin) who in 1931 took over as chairman of Zagreb′s chapter of the Union of Russian Officers; generals Nikolai Stremoukhov, Alexander Ozarovsky and Pavel Panchenko-Krivorotenko; Archbishop Germogen (Maximov), who became the primate of the Croatian Orthodox Church in 1942.

After the German invasion of Yugoslavia in April 1941 and the establishment of the Independent State of Croatia (NDH), the number of registered Russians who resided in the territory of the NDH totaled 5,000. In August 1941, the NDH government issued a directive that exempted Russians in the NDH from any discrimination or reprisals as long as they were politically loyal; political loyalty was to be certified by Russian colonies′ leadership, namely the Representation of Russian Emigration (Predstavništvo ruske emigracije) in Zagreb. As early as in July 1941, a campaign was launched to recruit the Russians in the NDH to what would be in September instituted as the Separate Russian Corps (later known in German as Russisches Schutzkorps Serbien). The commander of the Corps, with headquarters in Belgrade, was Russian general Boris Shteifon, who died in Zagreb′s Esplanade hotel in April 1945 while leading his men to Austria. According to a report received by the Main Ustaša Headquarters in early 1942, in the territory of the NDH there were forty Russian colonies with about 5.500 people. Since most of the Russians in the NDH were of anti-Communist and anti-Soviet political orientation, a significant number of them had left Zagreb months before the end of WWII and the establishment of the Communist regime in Croatia, the final massive departures occurring in the autumn of 1944 and in early spring of 1945; a considerable number of those who stayed were later in 1945 subjected to reprisals and prosecution. All Russian clubs and associations were terminated after May 1945. Germogen (Maximov), along with three priests of the Croatian Orthodox Church, was court-martialled on 29 June 1945 and executed the next day.

Some former citizens of the Russian Empire and the Soviet Union left for the USSR, a move that was facilitated by the Decree of the Supreme Soviet of 14 June 1946. The situation for the Russians in Yugoslavia became still worse in 1948, following the Cominform Resolution of 28 June 1948 that resulted from the Tito–Stalin Split. Some Russians, who already had Yugoslavian citizenship, were stripped of it, especially in the summer and autumn of 1948; some were deported to the USSR as exposed Soviet spies. After 1948, Russians′ social and cultural life in Zagreb in any form virtually ceased.

In the 1960s and 1970s, the Socialist Federal Republic of Yugoslavia developed economic ties with the Soviet Union, which caused immigration of Soviets to Croatia, usually Soviet women through marriage. During the period of dissolution of Yugoslavia, Croatia′media created a negative perception of those residents of Croatia who were Orthodox Christians; teaching of the Russian language in schools was largely abandoned. Nevertheless, the number of Russians in Croatia nearly doubled in the period between 1991 and 2011.

In modern Croatia, ethnic Russians (persons who identify themselves as such), who are citizens of Croatia, are expressly cited as one of the twenty-two ″national minorities″ recognised by the Constitution of Croatia (″the Republic of Croatia is hereby established as the nation state of the Croatian nation and the state of the members of its national minorities: [...]″). According to 2011 Census, there were 1,279 Russians in Croatia. Their rights, like the rights of other "national minorities" (Croatian: nacionalne manjine) in Croatia, are regulated by the Constitutional Act on The Rights of National Minorities in the Republic of Croatia adopted in 2002 and amended in 2010. Chapter 16 thereof reads as follows: ″Members of national minorities, their associations and national minority councils and representatives may freely maintain contacts with people with whom they share the same ethnic, linguistic, cultural and/ or religious traits, and with legal entities based in the country of that people which engage in educational, scholarly, cultural, publishing and humanitarian activities.″ According to 2021 Census, there were 1,481 Russians in Croatia.

== See also ==
- Croatia–Russia relations
- Ethnic groups in Croatia
- Russian diaspora
