= Croatia–Russia relations =

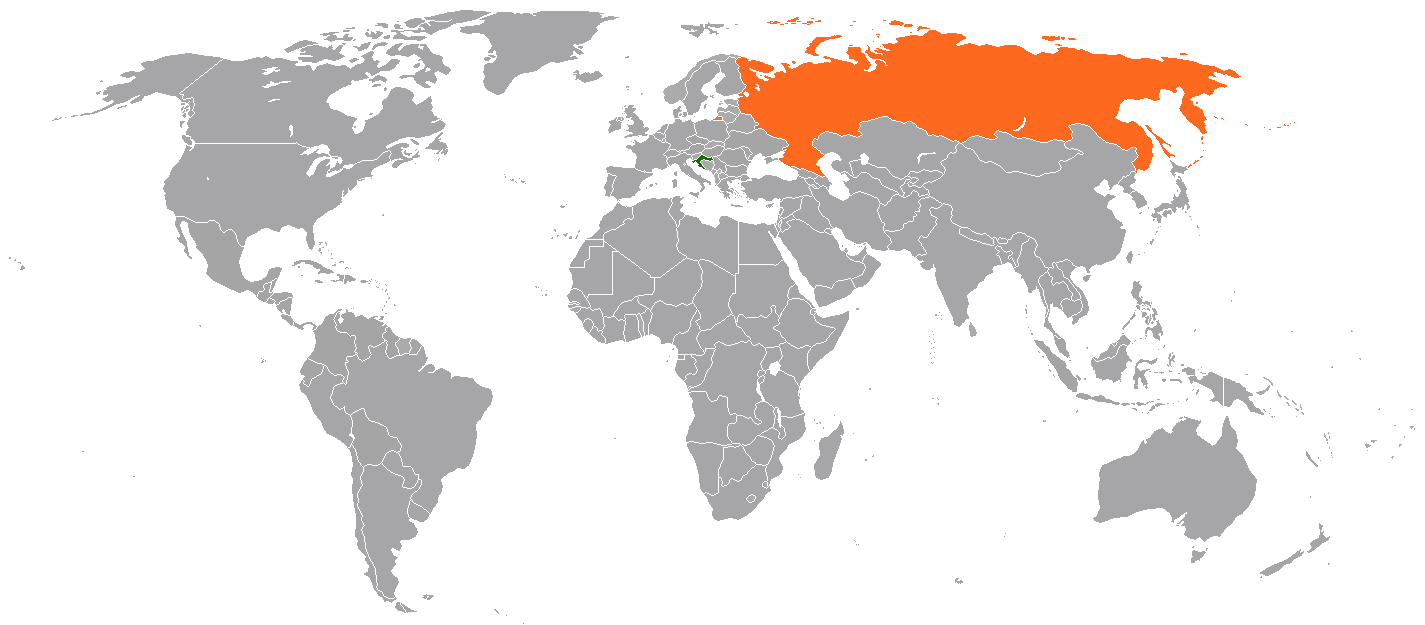

- Croatia: Russia

Diplomatic mission
- Croatian embassy in Moscow: Russian embassy in Zagreb

Envoy
- Tomislav Car: Andrey Nesterenko

Croatia and Russia established diplomatic relations on 25 May 1992. Croatia has an embassy in Moscow and honorary consulates in Kaliningrad, Novosibirsk, and Sochi. Russia has an embassy in Zagreb and honorary consulates in Pula and Split. The two nations are geographically distant within Europe. They are both Slavic countries and thus share distant language heritage. Both are members of the OSCE.

Since the 2010s, Russian–Croatian relations have been cold due to divergent political ideologies. Croatia is strongly aligned with the Western world, alongside the United States, NATO, and the European Union. Russian influence in Serbia and within Montenegro routinely complicate trilateral relations with Croatia. Croatia sanctioned Russia over the Russo-Ukrainian war, limiting Russian access to both its tourism and energy sectors.

== Background ==
Cultural and personal ties between Russia and persons from the territory of modern Croatia date far back prior to Croatian independence in 1991, such as a trip to Moscow by Croatian Catholic missionary Juraj Križanić in 1659 who later was exiled to Tobolsk in Siberia where he spent 16 years writing manuscripts that promoted Pan-Slavism.

Against the backdrop of the Illyrian movement, a pan-South-Slavist movement, regarded in Croatian historiography as part of the Croatian national revival (Hrvatski narodni preporod), some prominent Croats in the 19th century (the lands of modern Croatia then being largely part of the Austrian Empire, later Austria-Hungary) sought to develop a stronger relationship with Russia because "they saw in Imperial Russia a world power and brotherly Slavic nation from which they had hoped to gain help during the Croatian National Revival."

Croatian nationalist Eugen Kvaternik, who was one of the two founders of the Croatian nationalist Party of Rights, traveled, among other countries, to Russia at the end of 1857 and stayed there for most of 1858 hoping to enlist help for the cause of the Croatian independence from the Austrian empire (Russo-Austrian relations were poor in the wake of the Crimean War), but did not accomplish much. He later came to view Russia as a threat to the cause of the Catholics in the Croatian lands as he believed that Russia sought to enhance its own influence in the Balkans by promoting the Orthodox faith and therefore supported the Orthodox Serbs. One of the notable figures of the Illyrian movement, Ivan Kukuljević Sakcinski, maintained contacts with a number of Russian academics, slavists, university professors, his contact person with them being the Russian priest at the Russian Embassy in Vienna, Mihail Fjodorović Rajevski. He wrote to Russian scientist Alexander Stepanovich Popov in 1877: "You in Moscow know very well for how long South Slavs had been waiting for salvation. You also know that the eyes of the Slavs are fixed on you and that our hearts are full with you".

While Russia's relations with Serbia, a country popularly viewed as a traditional ally of Russia, deteriorated following the Russo-Turkish War and the 1878 Congress of Berlin (the public in Serbia viewed the terms thereof as overly favourable for Bulgaria, Russia's client state, at the expense of Serbia), her influence in the Croatian lands increased: the Party of Rights under Ante Starčević adopted a Russophile orientation, a tactic in their bid to achieve Croatian independence of the Habsburgs. Such aspirations notwithstanding, the visit to Saint Petersburg by Austrian Emperor Franz Joseph and his conference with Nicholas II of Russia in 1897 heralded a secret agreement between the two empires to honour and seek to maintain the status quo in the Balkans.

In 1914–1917, several formations of the Royal Croatian Home Guard within the Austro-Hungarian Army, as well as the Common Army′s (K.u.K.) regiments recruited from the Kingdom of Croatia-Slavonia (such as the 79th Infantry Regiment from Otočac), participated in the WWI campaigns fighting against the Imperial Russian Army in Galicia and Bukovina; they incurred heavy losses in August—September 1914 and especially during the first phase of the Russian offensive in June 1916.

During the period between the world wars, in the 1920s–1930s, the Kingdom of Yugoslavia, which had incorporated the Croatian lands, hosted a sizable part of the White exiles who fled Soviet Russia during the Russian Civil War. Along with Serbia, Croatia accepted thousands of mainly indigent Russian refugees led by General Pyotr Wrangel and Metropolitan Anthony Khrapovitsky. Until his death in 1936, Metropolitan Anthony was regarded as a leader of all the Russian refugees in Yugoslavia, a country whose staunchly anti-Soviet, anti-Communist monarchist regime refused to establish diplomatic relations with the USSR until June 1940. Zagreb and some other Croatian cities had numerous military, religious, educational and professional Russian establishments, all of which were closed down in May 1945, after the imposition of the Communist regime in Croatia. Most of those few Russians who had failed to leave for the West, were subjected to reprisals and prosecution, or forced to leave for the USSR.

During the German-Soviet War (June 1941–May 1945), the 369th Croatian Reinforced Infantry Regiment (a unit of Germany′s 100th Jäger Division of the German Army, under Croatian officers Viktor Pavičić and later Marko Mesić) was the only non-German military unit that was assigned to fight inside the city itself (unlike the Italian and Romanian troops) and went on to distinguish itself, in the Battle of Stalingrad, but nonetheless surrendered along with the German 6th Army in early February 1943. The Luftwaffe's Croatian Air Force Legion was in active combat against the Soviets from October 1941 until July 1944. Kriegsmarine's Croatian Naval Legion was active along the Soviet coast of the Black Sea and was from May 1942 based in Mariupol on the northern coast of the Sea of Azov (the city had been captured virtually without a fight by the LSSAH on 8 October 1941).

At the end of the war in Europe, units of the Red Army′s 3rd Ukrainian Front fought in some Croat-populated territories, then mostly outside the borders of the pro-Germany Independent State of Croatia (the NDH). On the day Germany attacked the Soviet Union, 22 June 1941, the Communist Party of Yugoslavia (CPY) received orders from the Moscow-based Comintern to come to the Soviet Union's aid and on the same day, Croatian communists set up the 1st Sisak Partisan Detachment, the first armed anti-fascist guerrilla unit formed in occupied Yugoslavia during World War II. From July 1941, Tito's Yugoslav Partisans, supported by the USSR, fought against Germany, the NDH, and allies thereof, as well as Chetniks. In November 1944, during the Battle of Batina (now in Croatia), 1,237 men of the Red Army were killed fighting against the combined Axis forces. On the other hand, the 1st Cossack Cavalry Division and the 2nd Cossack Cavalry Division merged into the XV SS Cossack Cavalry Corps in February 1945 under German command and manned mainly by Cossacks from the USSR, from 1943 conducted successful tactical operations in Croatia against both Communist guerrillas and — from late 1944 — the Red Army. Also fighting on the territory of the NDH from October 1944 — against the Communist partisans and the Soviet troops — were the retreating units of the Russian Protective Corps, whose commander, Russian general Boris Shteifon, died in Zagreb on 30 April 1945.

The defeat of the NDH in mid-May 1945 was followed by mass killings of Croat prisoners and the establishment later that year of a pro-Soviet (until mid-1948) one-party Communist Federal People's Republic of Yugoslavia, the People's Republic of Croatia being one of its constituent republics. The USSR maintained a consulate general in Zagreb.

Social scientists concurred that for most people in Croatia, a constituent republic of Yugoslavia until 1991 where the equality of ethnic Serbs and Croats, as constituent nations, was formally recognized in every aspect, the dominant political narrative that tended to determine voting at elections, perpetuated their respective families′ political affiliation during WWII: either with Tito's Communist partisans, or supporters of the Nazi-backed Ustasha regime of the NDH, a schism in Croatia's society that had grown even wider since the consensus-based political goal of acceding to the EU was accomplished in 2013. A number of prominent Croats in Socialist Yugoslavia had close ties with the USSR and these people's influence in the government of independent Croatia that emerged in 1991 continued thereafter.

== History ==
=== 1990s ===
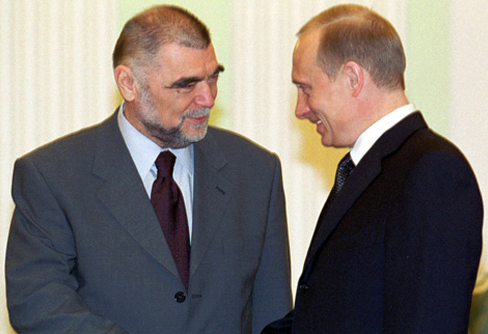
Croatian president Stjepan Mesić and Russian president Vladimir Putin in Moscow in 2002

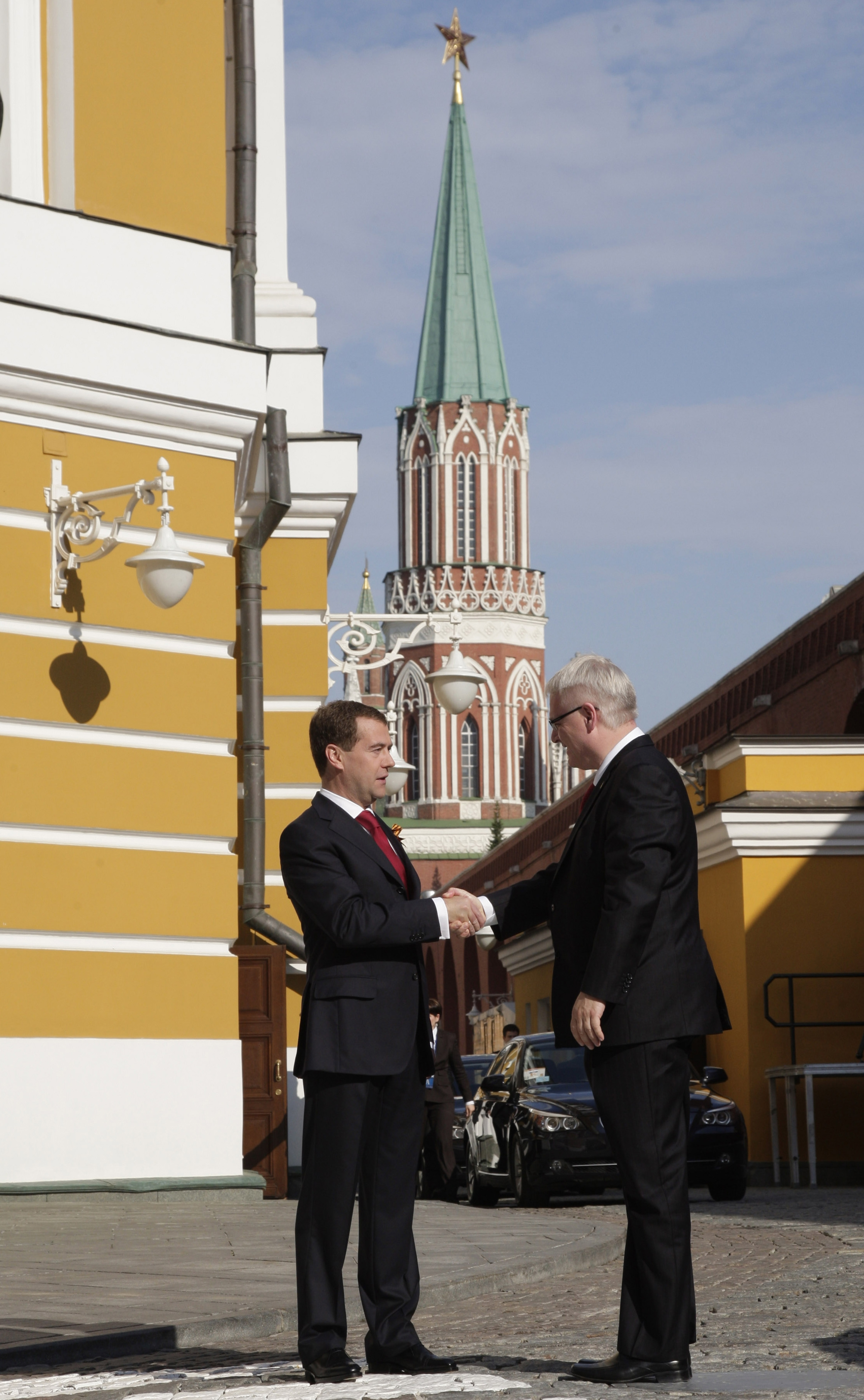
Croatian president Ivo Josipović and Russian president Dmitri Medvedev in Moscow in 2010

According to the allegations in the Croatian press, in violation of the UN arms embargo imposed on the former Yugoslavia, during the Croatian War of Independence, significant amounts of arms were delivered from Russia to Croatia. Russian president Boris Yeltsin allegedly approved shipments of weapons by 150 airplanes, which took off from a military base 200 kilometers east of Moscow in the period from 1992 to 1997. There were 150 to 160 flights that transported hundreds of tons of weaponry per year. In 2016, Croatian daily Večernji List published an article in which Marin Tomulić, representative of the Croatian Government's Office for the Protection of the Constitutional Order in negotiations on weaponry, stated that he received a catalog of all types of ″Russian″ weapons from the French Government. In 2017, Večernji List published an article in which businessmen Zvonko Zubak, owner of a company that was Croatia's main weapons supplier during the war, claimed that Russian ambassador to Croatia Anvar Azimov had summoned him to the Russian Embassy asking for an "inventory of all arms that arrived to Croatia via Russia between 1992 and 1997"; the article cited Azimov as allegedly stating that Croatia "should be reminded of who was arming and rescuing it during the embargo". The inventory, that Večernji List has seen, cites 16,000 tonnes of various Russian weapons, including two MiG 21 jets, few squadrons of transport and assault helicopters, including Mil Mi-24, and anti-aircraft systems, including the S-300 missile system. In April 2017, former Croatian president Ivo Josipović said that "during the war, Russia helped Croatia, not only with weaponry, but also politically". In April 2017, Russian Foreign Ministry officials rejected such allegations as false.

On 4 November 1996, Russian president Yeltsin awarded Croatian president Franjo Tuđman with Medal of Zhukov.

During the 1990s, major fortunes were made in Russia by some Croatian nationals such as Danko Končar, who attributed his business success in Russia, among other things, to his "normal human contact" with the FSB, Russia's successor agency to the USSR's KGB.

=== 2000—2020 ===
In the 2000s and early 2010s, consecutive presidents of Croatia, Stjepan Mesić and Ivo Josipović, made multiple official and working visits to Russia.

According to former Croatian ambassador to Russia Božo Kovačević, Russia's leadership stopped taking the Croatian government seriously by the end of the 2000s, as they had realised that successive governments of Croatia had been consciously deceiving their Russian counterparts when pledging cooperation on the Druzhba Adria pipeline project, whose eventual rejection by the Croatian side Kovačević puts down primarily to pressure on the part of the U.S. Instead, in order to create a powerful instrument of influence and secure Russian capture of Croatia's political establishment, Russia embarked on its tried-and-tested strategy of weakening the market position of a national oil and gas company, namely INA d.d., whose dominant role in the Croatian gas market had by 2017 been assumed by the Prvo Plinarsko Društvo (PPD) gas trading company, a proxy for importing Gazprom’s gas (PPD is owned by the Energia Naturalis Group). Among other things, by extending a loan, PPD financed the 2014–15 presidential election campaign of Kolinda Grabar-Kitarović, who went on to win the election. In the opinion of Denis Kuljiš, Russia had always sought to exercise control over Croatia′s president as it was understood that Croatia′s government "must take orders from Brussels". Additionally, Russian state-controlled oil company Zarubezhneft attempted, in the early 2010s, to get hold of INA's oil exploration concessions and to this end set up the Russian-Croatian company, Zarubezhneft Adria, with a minority stake owned by Croatian state-controlled crude oil transportation company JANAF (Jadranski naftovod). JANAF's consecutive CEOs, Ante Markov and Dragan Kovačević, were reputed to have close ties to Russia and lobby Russia's business interests in Croatia.

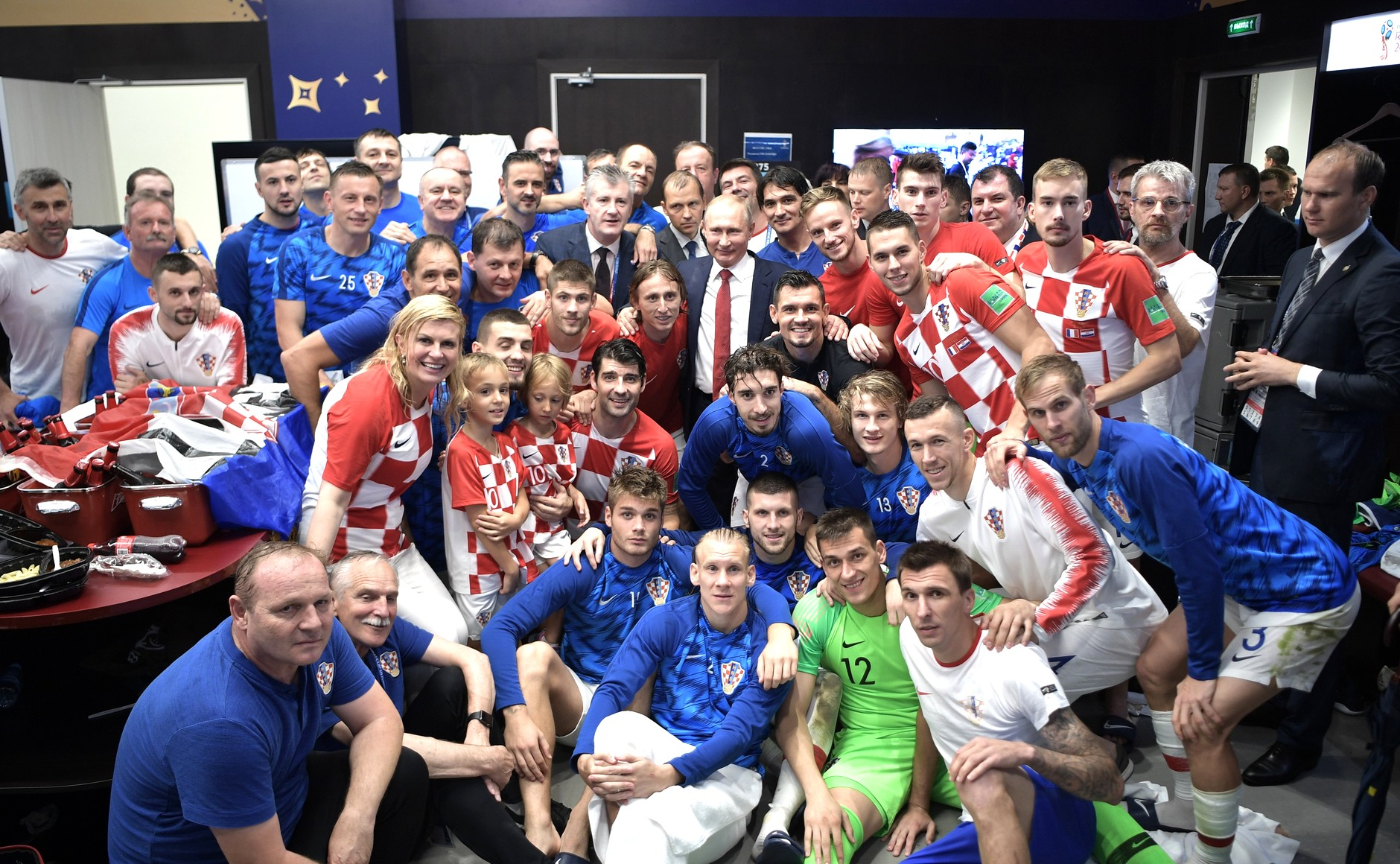
Croatia football players pose with presidents, Vladimir Putin and Kolinda Grabar-Kitarović, following the 2018 FIFA World Cup Final, which Croatia lost to France 4–2, the Luzhniki Stadium, Moscow.

In February 2015, the Milanović government went ahead with the pre-planned Russian-Croatian Economic Forum held in Moscow, thus defying the publicly made warning against doing so on the part of the U.S.; the Croatian delegation was led by the minister of economy Ivan Vrdoljak. At the beginning of 2016, Russian ambassador to Croatia Anvar Azimov complained publicly that none of the ten Croatian ministers invited by him to attend various events in Russia had visited Russia. At the end of 2016, Russian experts were cited as assessing Russian–Croatian relations as "cold".

In September 2016, Jutarnji list reported that Croatia had expelled one Russian diplomat suspected of spying. An unnamed source, described as "a former Croatian diplomat who was well familiar with the situation in Russia", stated that he knew for a fact that "the Russians were very hurt" and that they responded by expelling one Croatian diplomat. An article published in the Foreign Affairs magazine in July 2017 referred to Andrej Plenković′s government as "currently the West’s strongest ally against Russian expansion in the Balkans."

The visit to Russia by Croatia's president Kolinda Grabar-Kitarović in October 2017 was seen by Russian commentators as a sign of tentative warming of relations that had been ″semi-frozen″ on the official level since 2009. President Grabar-Kitarović stressed the prospects of economic cooperation between the countries.

On 26 March 2018, Croatia expelled one Russian diplomat as a show of solidarity with the United Kingdom which accused Russia of poisoning Sergei and Yulia Skripal. In retaliation, Russia on 30 March banned the chief of staff of the Croatian foreign minister Marija Pejčinović Burić — Rina Eterović Goreta, who had from 2015 until 2017 been Croatia's chargé d'affaires in Moscow, — from entering its territory in an official capacity. Russia's choice of person was judged to be a surprise by experts. According to mass media reports, some Croat businesspeople and politicians, namely Milijan Brkić, during the 2018 Bosnian general election campaign in Bosnia and Herzegovina were closely coordinating their activities with Russia's security and intelligence officials, specifically Nikolai Patrushev, Secretary of the Security Council of Russia and previously Director of the Russian Federal Security Service (in the opinion of the former minister of the interior of Croatia, Vlaho Orepić, published in the autumn of 2019, Milijan Brkić, while not holding any position in the government, was the de facto coordinator of Croatia's secret services; Milijan Brkić was also widely viewed as the kingmaker in the Croatian Democratic Union (HDZ), one of the country's two major political parties, as well as head of the informal "para-intelligence" grouping within the HDZ that had sought to undermine the Plenković administration, the country's judicial institutions, and individual state officials and had infiltrated Croatia's state institutions such as the Ministry of the Interior and the Military Security and Intelligence Agency, the activity of the latter having come to resemble, under his influence, that of "a mafia-type organisation", according to the agency's employees′ accusations published in early 2021). Following the 2018 Bosnian election, at which the Bosnian Croat candidate and leader of the Croatian Democratic Union of Bosnia and Herzegovina (HDZ BiH) party, Dragan Čović, failed to get elected Croat member of the BiH Presidency, Dragan Čović became a close political ally of the Bosnian Serb leader and Member of the Presidency, Milorad Dodik, who is known to enjoy support of Russia's leadership in his attempts to undermine the BiH statehood.

According to Croatian political observer Boris Rašeta, Russia's influence in Croatia had been steadily in the ascendant and, prior to Andrej Plenković's chairmanship of the HDZ, the party's leadership had enjoyed strong support in the Kremlin. Special friendly relationship with Russia's leadership fostered by Milan Bandić, the mayor of Zagreb (2005–2021), given multiple criminal investigations against him in Croatia, prompted Croatian press to speculate in the spring of 2020 that he was in a position to reckon on claiming political asylum in Russia to avoid subsequent extradition from his patrimonial BiH. In early September 2020, the outgoing Russian Ambassador to Croatia (2015–2020), Anvar Azimov, told a far-right Croatian weekly that his best friends in Croatia had been former president Stipe Mesić and mayor Milan Bandić and the three men addressed one another "brother" (brat); Azimov also said he had had meetings with Bandić "nearly each week" whereas Mesić, according to Azimov, had been awaiting him inside the Russian embassy the day Azimov arrived in Zagreb. According to Croatian political observers, the relationship between mayor Bandić and the HDZ-led government in the latter half of the 2010s grew into a political "symbiosis" that even survived the 2020 parliamentary election in which Bandić's party fared poorly. Stipe Mesić went on participating actively in Croatia's official foreign policy into 2021.

According to the statistics of the Croatian Ministry of the Interior published in early 2019, in the period from 2000 until 2017, sixty-six Russian nationals had been granted Croatian citizenship in the expedited procedure as provided for by Article 12 of the Law on Croatian Citizenship; some of these persons are believed to be members of Vladimir Putin′s inner circle of friends.

On 1 April 2019, Russia's Sberbank announced it had formally acquired ownership of ″about 40 per cent of the net assets of Fortenova Group". The latter was set up as part of the debt-for-equity swap deal agreed upon between the government-appointed extraordinary administration of the demised Agrokor, the biggest privately owned company in the Balkans founded by Ivica Todorić, and its creditors such as Sberbank and VTB Bank. The deal was viewed by experts as having given Vladimir Putin ″indirect leverage on the Croatian economy and on the largest firm in the former Yugoslavia″, Croatia’s Centre for Development Cooperation writing that "Russia ha[d] bought itself a NATO country". Sberbank's pointman for Agrokor had been Maxim Poletaev, whose wife, Yelena, was granted Croatian citizenship in 2015. Maxim Poletaev became chairman of Fortenova's board of directors. By having PPD acquire 6,4 per cent of Fortenova Group in early 2020, Russian business achieved majority control of the company.

=== Since 2020 ===
Miroslav Škoro′s political movement (DPMŠ) that emerged at the end of 2010s and was hailed as Croatia's Third Way party was reported to be financed by and have strong personal connections to, PPD and its owner, Pavao Vujnovac. The DPMŠ-led coalition came in third in the Croatian parliamentary election held in July 2020.

Following the valedictory visit that Russian ambassador to Croatia Anvar Azimov paid Croatian minister of defence Mario Banožić in early September 2020, the Croatian ministry of defence published a statement that said, "The minister of defence and the Russian ambassador have agreed that the two countries enjoy good and friendly relations". The Croatian Security and Intelligence Agency′s annual unclassified report for 2019 published a few days later stated that the Croatian ministry of defence, along with other government institutions, had been one of the targets of a series of sophisticated state-sponsored cyber attacks (advanced persistent threats); while the agency did not name the perpetrator, Croatian press cited Russia's intelligence services (FSB and GRU) as being the culprits. President Zoran Milanović's verbal attacks on the Plenković government as well as criticism of the U.S.′ policies voiced by him in the autumn of 2020 earned him praise from Russia's pro-government media.

Russian foreign minister Sergey Lavrov′s visit to Croatia that was to take place in late October 2020 was cancelled without any formal announcement and explanation from the Russia side, whereas his planned visit to Serbia was made longer. Russian media suggested the reason for calling off the previously announced stop in Zagreb within Lavrov's tour of the Balkans was Croatian prime minister Andrej Plenković's refusal to receive the Russian minister. However, the Croatian prime minister's office and the Croatian foreign minister dismissed such allegations saying the visit was postponed at the Russian side's request due to the epidemiological situation at the Russian Embassy in Zagreb. During Lavrov's visit to Zagreb that finally took place in mid-December 2020, Croatian foreign minister Gordan Grlić-Radman praised his Russian counterpart as a poet whose poems had been published shortly prior. Several weeks later, Russian ambassador Andrey Nesterenko in an interview referred to Grlić-Radman as "Lavrov′s friend"

The floating LNG terminal in Omišalj that began operations on 1 January 2021 had been hailed as a way for Croatia to ease its dependence on natural gas imported from Russia as well as bring greater gas diversity and competition to Central and Eastern Europe.

On 25 January 2022, against the backdrop of a renewed flare-up of confronation between Russia and the West over Ukraine, Croatia's president Zoran Milanović, whose prior public statements and foreign policy moves Croatian political analyst Davor Gjenero had attributed to Milanović being beholden to Russia's geopolitical agenda in the region, told the press that the crisis over Ukraine was due to the U.S.′ foreign policy and domestic politics; he also said that an "arrangement to meet Russia′s security interests" ought to be found and that he guaranteed that no Croatian troops would be dispatched in case of an escalation. On the same day, prime minister Plenković reacted to those statements by saying that on hearing those he thought it was being said "by some Russian official"; he also offered apologies to Ukraine and reiterated that Croatia supported Ukraine's territorial integrity. Politico commented on Milanović's statements by writing: "In the midst of the Ukraine crisis comes a surprise military maneuver — a Croatian confusion operation." The foreign ministry of Ukraine summoned Croatian ambassador Anica Djamić, whereafter the ministry issued a comment that said, "[...] Zoran Milanović's statements retransmit Russian propaganda narratives, do not correspond to Croatia's consistent official position in support of Ukraine's sovereignty and territorial integrity, harm bilateral relations and undermine unity within the EU and NATO in the face of current security threats in Europe. The Ministry of Foreign Affairs of Ukraine demands a public refutation of these insulting statements by the President of Croatia, as well as non-repetition in the future."

Following the Russian invasion of Ukraine, Croatia joined other countries in spring 2022 in declaring a number of Russian diplomats Persona non grata. In March 2022, the Government of the Russian Federation listed Croatia, along with the other EU states, as one of "foreign states and territories that commit unfriendly actions against Russia, its companies, and citizens".

In July 2022, the government of Russia added Croatia to "the list of countries committing unfriendly actions vis-à-vis Russia, particularly vis-à-vis its diplomatic and consular missions abroad"; the move specified that Croatia would not henceforth be allowed to hire staff for its diplomatic representations in Russia

Croatian President Zoran Milanović continued with his pro-Russian statements, stating in January 2023, "It is perfectly clear that Crimea will never again be part of Ukraine" whereas in October 2023 Lloyd Austin United States Secretary of Defense congratulated Croatia on it supply of military and humanitarian assistance to Ukraine.

== Economic ties ==
According to Croatian National Bank's data, Russia has invested €390.5 million in Croatia between 1993 and 2016, while Croatia invested €101 million in Russia in the same period. Croatia exports mainly food, drugs, shaving products, flasks for metal foundry and telecommunications equipment, while Russia exports oil, oil and petroleum gases, accounting 90 percent of imports from Russia to Croatia, mineral and chemical fertilizers, aluminum wrought and boilers for steam production. In 2008, according to Croatia's official statistics, trade between the countries totalled at 3.38bln US dollars. Due to mutual sanctions between the European Union and Russia introduced in 2014, the trade between Russia and Croatia declined in 2015 for 40%. According to the Federal Customs Service of Russia, the trade turnover between Croatia and Russia amounted $1.23 billion with Russian exports decreasing by 35%, amounting $988.4 million, and Croatian exports amounting $238 million, decreasing by 43.7%. In 2016, trade between two countries amounted c. $810 million. In 2017, trade between two countries amounted $807 million, and in the first half of 2018 rose by 64%.

In March 2017, more than a third of the debt incurred by Agrokor, Croatia's largest privately owned company that was put into state-run administration in April, was said to be held by Russia's two biggest banks, the state-owned Sberbank and VTB Bank. The Russian ambassador to Croatia Anvar Azimov's public threat to Agrokor in February 2017 was seen by Croatian and regional analysts as a sign that Agrokor's problems had a geopolitical dimension and were being instrumentalized by Russia to expand its influence and exert pressure. At an extradition hearing in the London court on 7 November 2017, Agrokor's owner Ivica Todorić’s lawyer stated that the criminal case against his client was linked to “perceived Russian influence” and ″ar[ose] in part from the involvement of Russian banks and financing.”

In 2021 Croatia exported goods worth $272m to Russia with medication being the main component, Russia shipped goods worth $818m in return, with crude oil being the main product.

== Tourism ==
In 2012, over 203,000 Russian citizens visited Croatia. After Croatia joined the EU in 2013, it was forced to introduce visas for Russian, Ukrainian and Turkish nationals, which consequentially led to the decline in arrivals of Russian tourists. In 2016, according to the Russian statistics, the number totaled upward of 55,000 persons.

== Resident diplomatic missions ==
- Croatia has an embassy in Moscow.
- Russia has an embassy in Zagreb.
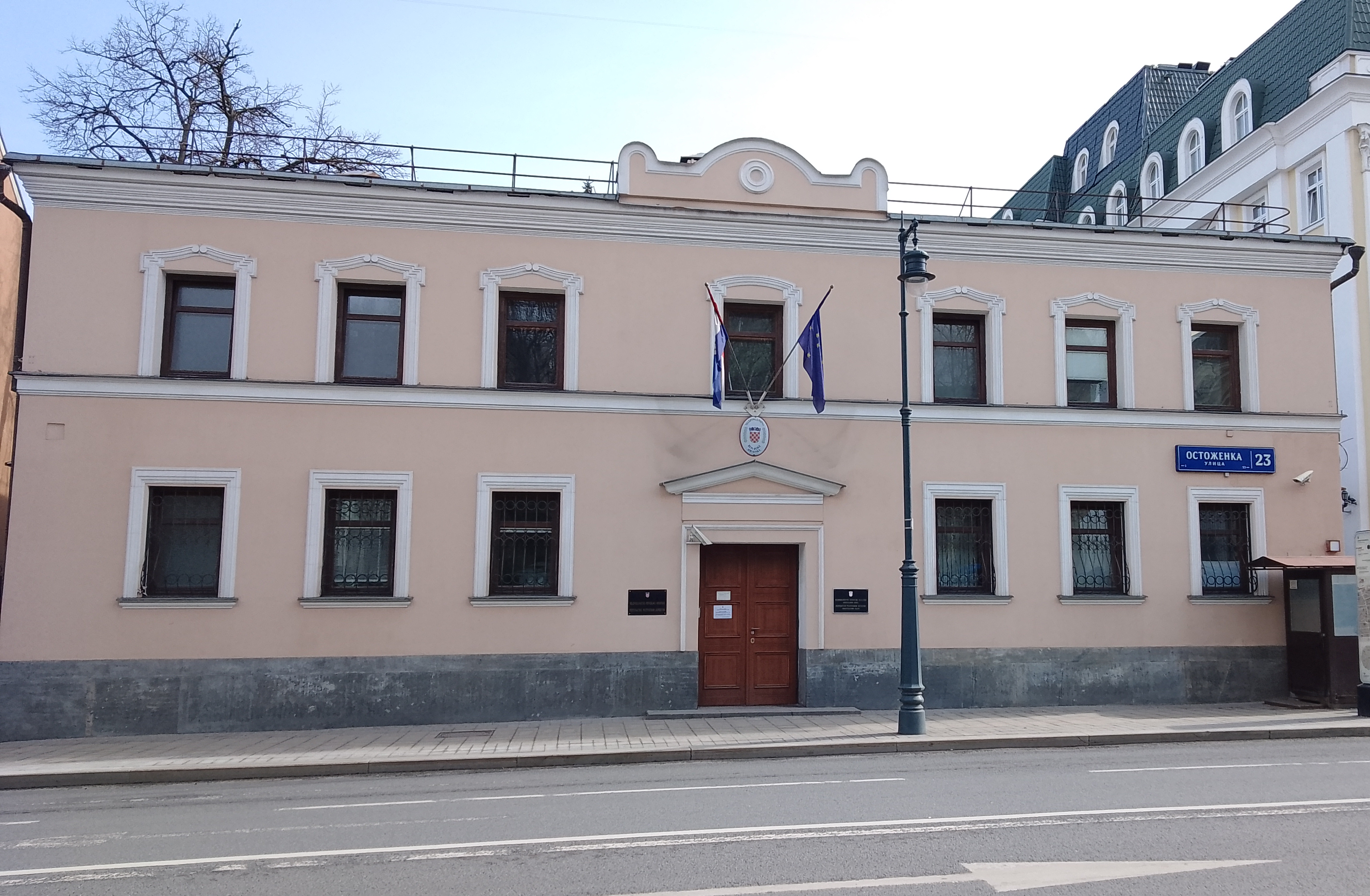
Embassy of Croatia in Moscow

== See also ==
- Russia–European Union relations
- Croatia–Ukraine relations
- Soviet Union–Yugoslavia relations
- Russians of Croatia

== Sources ==
- Enciklopedija Jugoslavije (1968). Enciklopedija Jugoslavije, Vol. 7 // Sovjetsko-jugoslovenski odnosi (in Serbo-Croatian). Zagreb, Socialist Federal Republic of Yugoslavia: Jugoslovenski leksikografski zavod.
