= Anatoly Rogozhin =

Russian military officer and Axis collaborator (1893–1972)

- Анатолий Иванович Рогожин
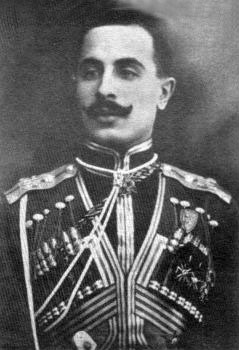
- Rogozhin in 1916
- Born: 12 April 1893; Chervlyonnaya, Terek Oblast, Caucasus Viceroyalty, Russian Empire
- Died: 6 April 1972 (aged 78); United States
- Military career
- Allegiance: (Russian Empire) Imperial Russia; (Russian Republic) White Movement; (Kingdom of Yugoslavia) Yugoslavia; Nazi Germany; Government of National Salvation
- Units: Terek Cossacks; Yugoslav Border Patrol; Russian Protective Corps
- Conflicts: World War I; Eastern Front; Russian Civil War; Southern Front; World War II; Yugoslav Campaign

Anatoly Ivanovich Rogozhin (Russian: Анатолий Иванович Рогожин; 12 April [O.S. 31 March] 1893 – 6 April 1972) was a Russian officer who served in the Imperial Russian Army, the White Army, and was the last commander of the Russian Corps in Serbia during World War II.

== Biography ==
He was born on 12 April 1893, in the stanitsa of Chervlyonnaya in the Terek Cossack Host, the son of a Cossack officer. After being raised in a cadet school and completing the Nikolaevsk Cavalry School, Rogozhin commanded several cossack units in Persia. Returning to Russia in 1914, Rogozhin fought on the South-Western front during World War I. He then served in Kiev, then went to Terek where his unit confronted rebellion in the face of the February Revolution.

== Career ==
In June 1918, Rogozhin participated in the Terek Cossack rebellion against the Bolsheviks and became a part of the White movement.

After evacuating from Russia, Rogozhin served in the Kingdom of Serbs, Croats, and Slovenes in the border patrol. During World War II he joined the Russian Corps, becoming the commander of a regiment. He received an Iron Cross second class for bravery in battle. Upon the death of General Boris Shteifon, he became the last commander of the Corps.

Rogozhin managed to negotiate a surrender with the British forces. He and his men were targeted for repatriation to the SMERSH but were saved by British general Sir James Steele. He became the commander of the refugee camp. He also helped organize the evacuation of Russian veterans of the Corps and was one of the last to leave the camp in 1951. Organizing the Russian Corps Combatants veterans organization (Союз Чинов Русского Корпуса), he also established the Nashi Vesti (Our News) periodical magazine.

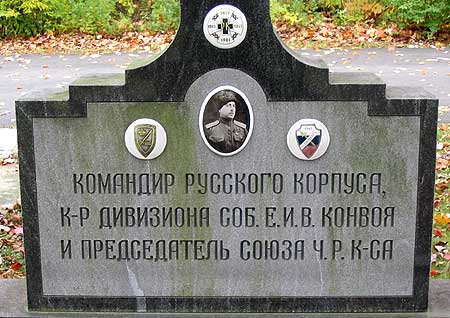
A closeup of the gravestone of Colonel Rogozhin

Rogozhin moved to the United States where he continued being active in white emigre organizations. He died on 6 April 1972, and is buried in the Novo Deveevo Russian Orthodox convent in Nanuet, New York, by a chapel dedicated to the Corps.

== See also ==
- Volunteer Army
- Russian Corps
