= Embassy of Croatia, Moscow =

Embassy

Coordinates: 55°44′19″N 37°35′57″E

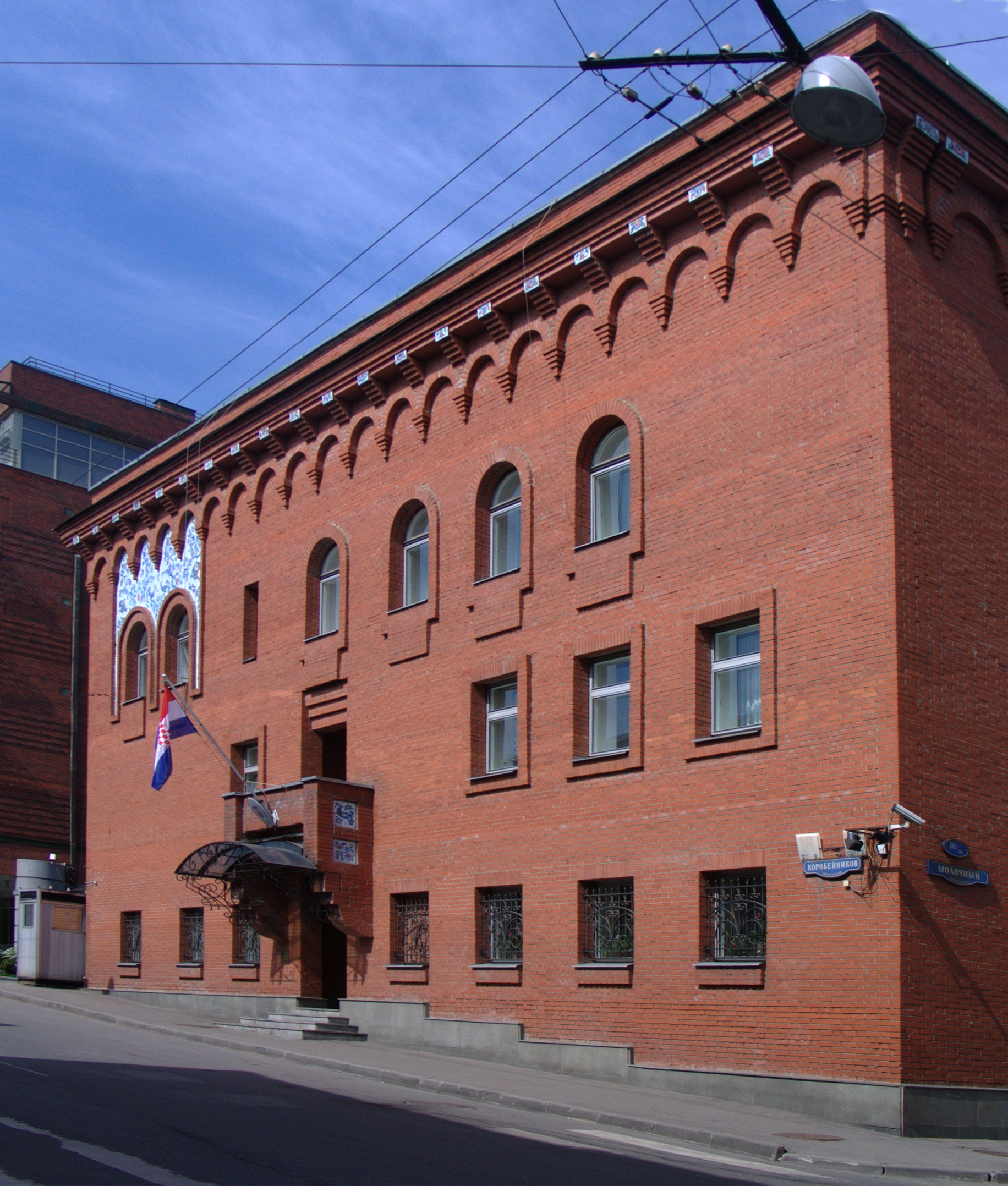
Embassy of Croatia in Moscow

The Embassy of Croatia in Moscow is the diplomatic mission of Croatia in the Russian Federation. It is located at 16 Korobeynikov Lane (Russian: Коробейников пер., 16/10) in the Khamovniki District of Moscow.

== See also ==
- Croatia–Russia relations
- List of diplomatic missions in Russia
