= Mikhail Skorodumov =

Russian general

Mikhail Fedorovich Skorodumov (Russian: Михаил Федорович Скородумов; 24 April 1892 – 15 November 1963, Los Angeles) was a Russian general who participated in World War I, the White movement, and founded the Nazi-allied Russian Corps in Serbia during World War II.

Skorodumov was born in 1892. He graduated the 1st Cadet Corps and the Pavlovsk Military Academy in 1912, as a sub-lieutenant of the Pavlovsk detachment. In 1914 with his detachment he was sent to the front. He was awarded the St. Vladimir order for bravery in battle, during which he was heavily wounded and consequently placed off duty. Skorodumov lobbied strongly to return to the front, and in 1915 was taken prisoner by the Germans. He unsuccessfully tried to escape three times, and after seven months of imprisonment returned to St. Petersburg in a prisoner exchange agreement (thanks partly to the lobbying of Grand Duchess Maria Pavlovna). He was awarded the Cross of St. George (Russia) for bravery.

In the wake of the October Revolution Skorodumov joined an underground anti-Bolshevik officer's organization. Upon its discovery by the Reds, he fled to join the Volunteer Army in the south of Russia. He served in the army as an invalid wearing a prosthesis, and was additionally wounded in the leg during the siege of Kiev in 1919. After being interred in Poland he left for the army of General Pyotr Wrangel in the Crimea.

After Wrangel's defeat, Skorodumov evacuated with the army to Gallipoli, after which he moved to Bulgaria. As a commandant in the city of Lovech, he left with General Alexander Kutepov to the Kingdom of Yugoslavia. There in Yugoslavia, Skorodumov built a memorial for the fallen Russian veterans of World War I.

In 1941, one day after the German invasion of the Soviet Union, Skorodumov proposed the formation of the Russian Protective Corps, an independent armed outfit of Russian white emigres. Many Russian emigres hoped for the opportunity to fight on the Eastern front, and liberate Russia from communism. The German forces agreed to work with Skorodumov and appointed him as the head of the Russian Corps, only to be arrested by the Gestapo three days later for proclaiming the corps as an "independent" armed force. Skorodumov passed on command to Boris Shteifon, whom the Germans approved of.

After leaving jail, Skorodumov demonstratively refused to join the Corps and worked for three years as a cobbler. In 1944, Skorodumov decided to enlist in the Corps as a private, moving to Austria. He moved to the United States and pleaded with the "Humanity Calls" organization to help the veterans of the Corps receive displaced person status, thus enabling them to seek refuge in the United States.

Skorodumov died in Los Angeles on November 15, 1963, and was buried in the Hollywood Forever Cemetery.
