= Russian Protective Corps =

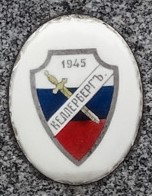
- Active: 1941–1945
- Allegiance: Nazi Germany (1941–1944); KONR (1944–1945)
- Branch: Heer
- Type: Cavalry; Infantry
- Role: Anti-partisan operations
- Size: 17,090 troops (total membership); 11,197 troops (maximum strength)
- Engagements: World War II; Belgrade Offensive; Operation Lawine

Commanders
- Notable commanders: Mikhail Skorodumov; Boris Shteifon †; Anatoly Rogozhin

The Russian Protective Corps (German: Russisches Schutzkorps, Russian: Русский охранный корпус, romanized: Russkiy okhrannyy korpus, Serbian: Руски заштитни корпус, romanized: Ruski zaštitni korpus) was a foreign volunteer unit of the Wehrmacht composed of White Russian émigrés who collaborated with Nazi Germany during World War II. Raised in the German-occupied territory of Serbia and commanded for almost its whole existence by Lieutenant General Boris Shteifon, it served primarily as a guard force for factories and mines between late 1941 and early 1944, initially as the "Separate Russian Corps" then as the Russian Factory Protective Group. Incorporated into the Wehrmacht on 1 December 1942, the Corps later clashed with the communist-led Yugoslav Partisans and briefly with the Chetniks. In late 1944, it fought against the Red Army during the Belgrade Offensive, later withdrawing to Bosnia and Slovenia as the German forces retreated from Yugoslavia and Greece. After Shteifon′s death in Zagreb in the Independent State of Croatia on 30 April 1945, Russian Colonel Anatoly Rogozhin (1893–1972) took command and led his troops farther north to surrender to the British authorities in southern Austria. The British did not treat Rogozhin and his men formally as Soviet citizens, unlike most other Russian formations which had fought for Nazi Germany. Corps members, exempted from forced repatriation to the Soviet Union, were eventually set free and allowed to re-settle in the West.

== Background and formation ==
Before World War II there were approximately 15,000 White Russian émigrés in the Balkans - their families had fled there in the aftermath of the 1917 Russian Revolution. General Pyotr Nikolayevich Wrangel relocated 25,000 of his Southern White Army to Yugoslavia through negotiations with the Yugoslav government in 1921. On 6 April 1941, Axis forces invaded the Kingdom of Yugoslavia. Poorly equipped and poorly trained, the Royal Yugoslav Army was quickly defeated. The Axis powers then dismembered Yugoslavia, with Serbia being reduced to its pre-1912 borders and placed under German military occupation. The Germans selected General Milan Nedić, a pre-war politician who was known to have pro-Axis leanings, to lead the collaborationist Government of National Salvation in the German-occupied territory of Serbia. Over the course of the uprising in Serbia in the summer of 1941, communist-led partisans killed approximately 300 Russian émigrés and injured many more, sometimes in acts of vengeance. In response, local Russians began to organize themselves into self-defense units. At the time, there were an estimated 10,000 Russian men within the former borders of Yugoslavia, the majority of whom lived in occupied Serbia.

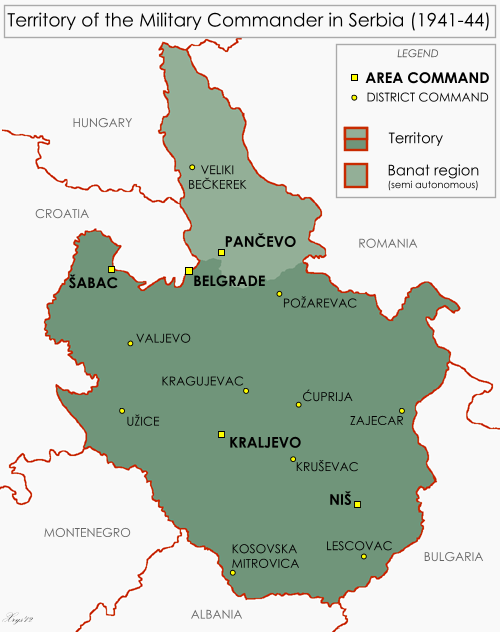
A map showing the German occupied territory of Serbia from 1941 to 1944

The Russian Protective Corps, founded in Belgrade under the command of General Mikhail Skorodumov on 12 September 1941, was initially known as the "Separate Russian Corps" (German: Das Abgesonderte Russische Korps; Russian: Отдельный русский корпус). It was established by an order of the German Military Commander in Serbia, General der Flieger Heinrich Danckelmann, with the agreement of the Nedić regime. The key German personality involved in organising the Corps was Danckelmann's chief of staff, Oberst Erich Kewisch. Recruitment and screening of volunteers was carried out by Major General Vladimir Kreyter, a White Russian émigré in German service who was the head of the Russian Intelligence Office (German: Vertrauensstelle) in Serbia. The corps drew its initial manpower from émigré White Russians and officers of the Russian Imperial Army, which had been defeated by the Red Army in the Russian Civil War twenty years earlier. The émigrés had been living in occupied Serbia, and sided with the Germans because of their opposition to communism, and because they believed that their only hope of a non-communist Russia lay in a German victory in World War II. Skorodumov's concept of the Corps was that once the Corps had fulfilled its obligation to Serbia, the land that had taken its members in, they would go to Russia to fight. The force was renamed the "White Russian Factory Protection" (German: Weissrussischer Werkschutz) on 2 October.

Skorodumov was elderly, ill, and not well known to the rank-and-file of White Russian émigrés. Two days after the formation of his Corps, the Gestapo arrested him, and command passed to Lieutenant General Boris Shteifon, who was said to have had "warm and friendly relations with [Milan] Nedić". The Germans envisaged a force 3,000-strong and organized into three regiments, tasked with protecting factories, other industrial concerns, and mines that were producing materials to support the German war-effort. The Corps initially consisted of a single regiment, organized into four battalions. Major General Egorov commanded the 1st Battalion, Colonel Shatilov the second, Colonel Endrzheevskiy the third, and Colonel Nestrenko the fourth. A second regiment was set up on 18 October, commanded by Colonel Zhukov. At first, the group was an independent force reporting to the German plenipotentiary general for economic affairs, NSFK-Obergruppenführer Franz Neuhausen.

== Operations ==
=== General ===
Although its ultimate aim was to help defeat the communist forces in the Soviet Union, the Corps was used almost exclusively to fight the Partisans in areas of occupied Yugoslavia, initially in a defensive role. At its maximum strength, it was composed of one cavalry regiment and four infantry regiments. Between the autumn of 1941 and the spring of 1944, the Corps was primarily responsible for protecting weapons factories, mines, roads, and railroads throughout occupied Serbia in accordance with priorities established by the German High Command. The Corps never operated as a unified force, the regiment being its largest operational unit. The regiments were later assigned to act as auxiliaries to German or Bulgarian occupying forces. During its existence, it was reinforced with younger émigrés and former Soviet prisoners-of-war (POW). Russian émigrés living in Bulgaria, the Axis puppet Independent State of Croatia (NDH) and Hungary also came to Belgrade to join the force. It was armed by the Germans with weapons captured from the Royal Yugoslav Army, and its command language was Russian. Throughout its existence it maintained good relations with the Nedić administration.

While guarding facilities, members of the Corps were largely assigned to manning brick bunkers, protecting the railway in the Ibar River valley, the Bor, Trepča, Majdanpek, and Krupanj mines, as well as the borders of the occupied territory along the Danube and Drina rivers. They were often deployed alongside various Serbian collaborationist forces such as the Serbian State Guard (SDS) and the Serbian Volunteer Corps (SDK), with whom they were most closely allied. The Corps also closely cooperated with the Croatian fascist Ustaše when operating in the neighbouring NDH. Members of the Corps also plundered peasants in the areas within which they operated.

=== Early actions ===
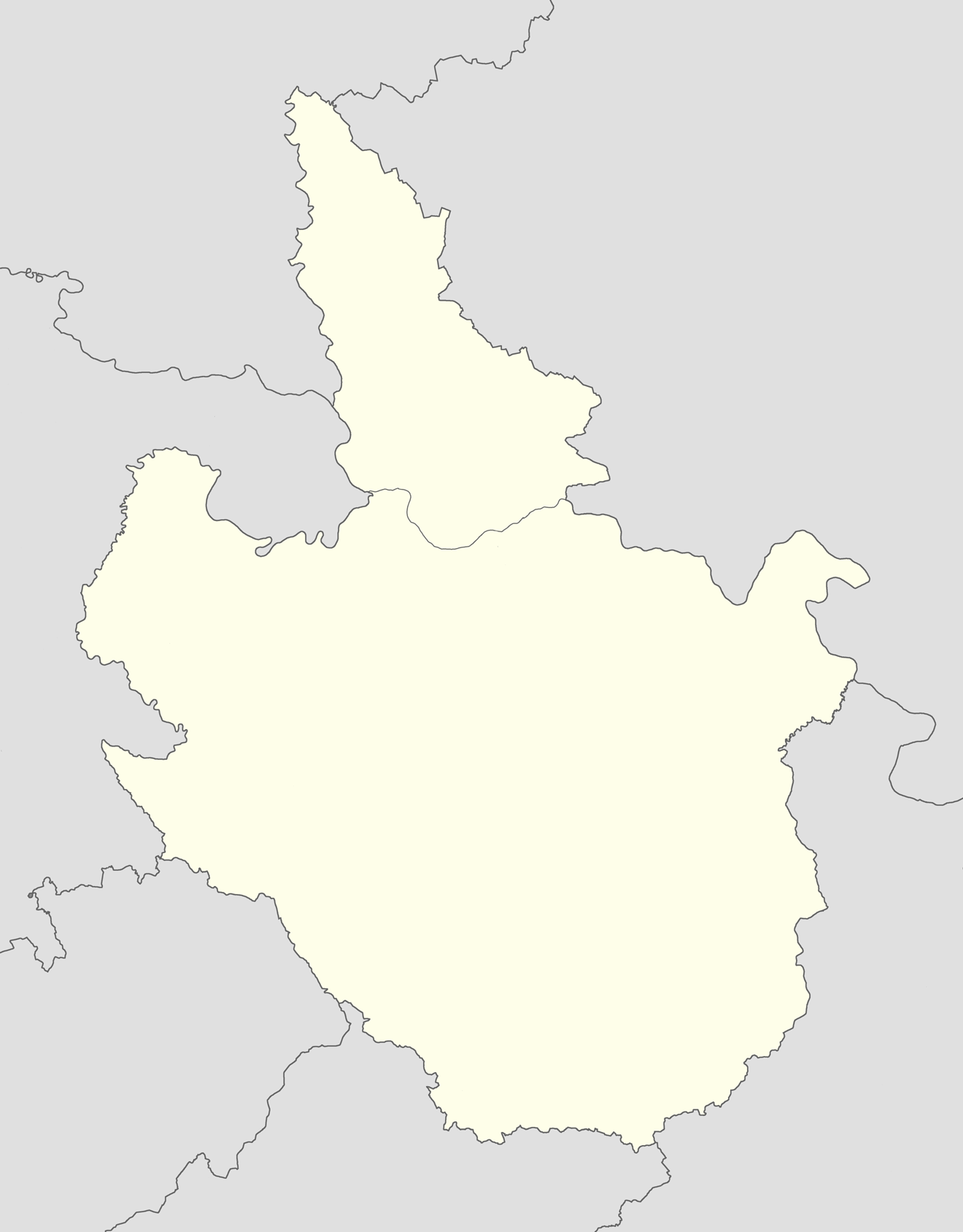
Map showing the early deployment locations of the Russian Protective Corps

The Corps was initially used to guard mines at Krupanj in the west of the territory, and later at Bor in the west and Trepča in the south. The 1st Regiment was initially deployed in Loznica, Ljubovija and other towns along the Drina river, which formed the western border of the occupied territory. The 2nd Regiment first operated in towns such as Negotin, Bor, and Majdanpek near the eastern border with Romania. At the time, the two regiments were operationally subordinated to the German 704th Infantry Division. In November 1941, the Corps began actively collaborating with the Chetniks of Draža Mihailović against the Partisans. On 8 December 1941, the Corps defended the Stolice mine near Krupanj against the Partisans. By late 1941, it had 1,500 members.

The 3rd Regiment was established in Banjica near Belgrade on 8 January 1942, placed under the command of Colonel Shapilov, and deployed to Kosovska Mitrovica near the Trepča mines in the south, where it was operationally subordinated to the Bulgarian 1st Occupation Corps. The 4th Regiment was established on 29 April with General Cherepov as commander and was deployed to the central west region of the occupied territory area around Kraljevo. In May, the Corps was divided into two brigades. The 1st Brigade was placed under the command of Major General Dratsenko and its headquarters was established in the town of Aranđelovac on 22 May. Also in May, Kewisch submitted a report stating that if he were permitted to recruit from all areas of Europe under German control, he could raise a force of about 25,000 men. He also urged the higher authorities to re-organise the Corps and integrate it more closely with the Wehrmacht. After considerable discussion, on 29 October the German High Command ordered a re-organization, renaming it the "Russian Protective Corps" and subordinating it completely to the German Commanding General in Serbia.

On 30 November, the 4th Regiment was disbanded, its 1st Battalion assigned to the 1st Regiment and the rest of its manpower assigned to the 2nd Regiment. On 1 December 1942, the Corps was incorporated into the Wehrmacht and all its members were required to swear an oath to German leader Adolf Hitler. The Corps grew in numbers throughout 1942, following an influx of volunteers from Bulgaria, Croatia, Romania and Greece. By late 1942, the Corps totalled about 7,500 men, all of whom were Russian. During the re-organization, an attempt was made to expand the Corps further by recruiting Soviet POWs, but the first experiment with 300 POWs proved unsuccessful and was not repeated. On 9 December 1942, the 1st Regiment started to be transformed with the arrival of Kuban Cossacks led by Major General Naumenko. By January 1943, it consisted entirely of Cossacks. On 17 March 1943, Major General Gontarev replaced Shapilov as commander of the 3rd Regiment. The 1st Regiment fought in Loznica in April and participated in a large operation in Zapolje just south of Krupanj over the border with the NDH on 11–15 May, where it engaged in heavy combat with Partisan forces. From 1–8 July, the regiment was again stationed in Loznica and Ljubovija, participating in the defence of the Drina Bridge at Zvornik against the Partisans. During this time the regiment allowed the passage of 379 wounded Croatian soldiers and civilians, 1,000 healthy soldiers and as many refugees, sustaining casualties of two killed and seventeen wounded. It clashed with the Partisans over the village of Nedelica on 19 July. Meanwhile, the 2nd Regiment clashed with the Partisans around the town of Negotin. The 4th Regiment was re-established on 15 December, and was based in Jagodina, Paraćin and Ćuprija in the centre of the occupied territory.

=== Retreat, surrender, disbandment ===
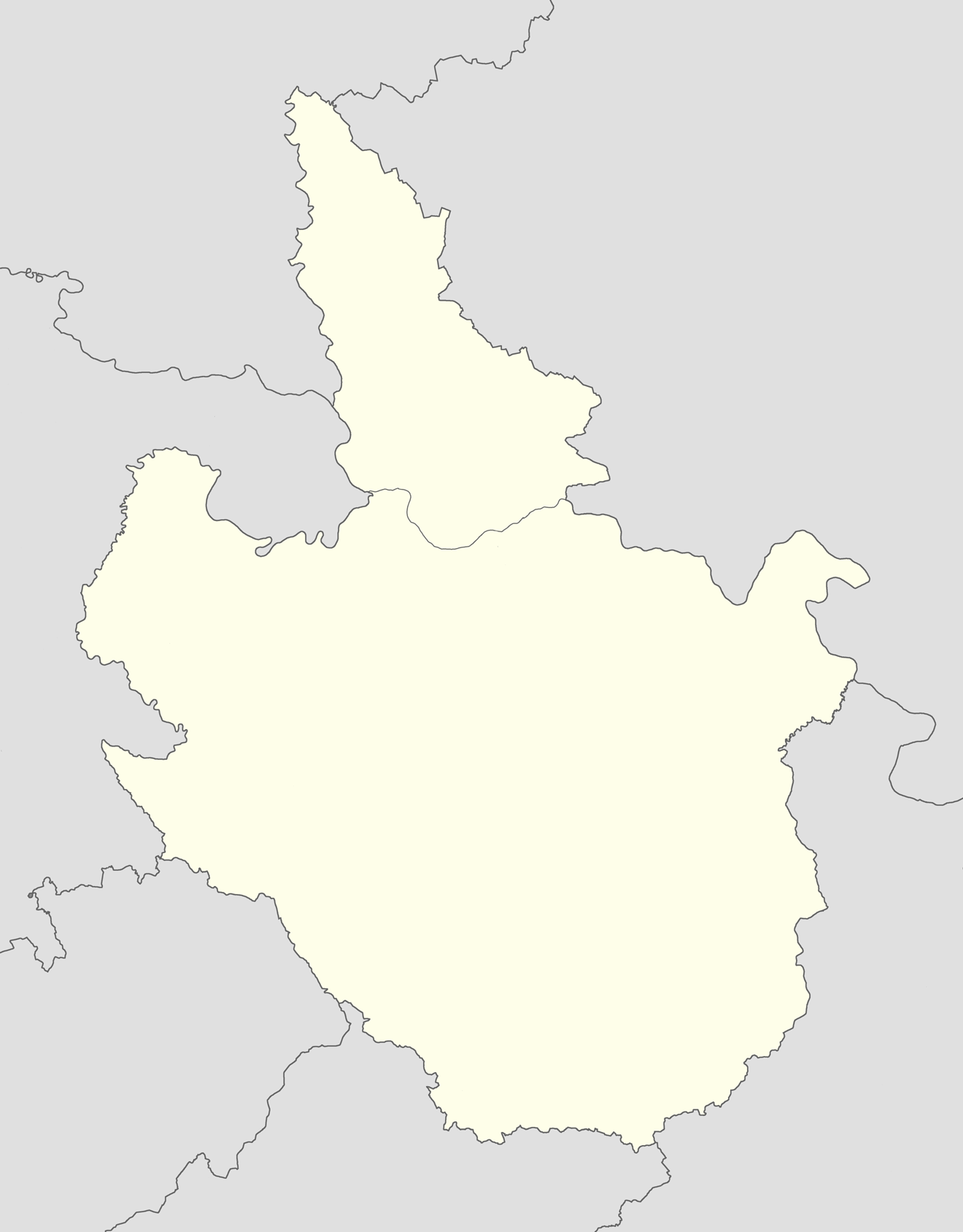
Map showing locations where the Russian Protective Corps fought in 1944–1945

From the spring of 1944, the Corps focused increasingly on fighting the Partisans penetrating Serbia from Bosnia and the Sandžak, and the first clashes with Chetnik groups did not occur until 1944. On 5 January 1944, combat with the Partisans in Klenak resulted in the deaths of three Cossacks of the 1st Regiment. On 18 January, the 5th Regiment was formed in Obrenovac. The 3rd Regiment outfought a 2,400-strong Partisan force advancing towards Jošanička Banja on 31 March. On 28 April, the 1st Regiment prepared defences along the Drina in Zvornik, Bajina Bašta and Loznica areas expecting the 16th and 17th Partisan Divisions to attempt a crossing there. On 30 April, the headquarters of the 4th Regiment was moved to Aleksinac. On 1–2 May, the 5th Regiment fought the Partisans in the village of Mravinci, sustaining casualties of 11 killed and 25 wounded. That summer, the Corps mediated an agreement between one group of Chetniks and the Germans in which the two parties agreed to fight the Partisans in Serbia. On 18 July, the 5th Regiment fought in Jošanička Banja and its regimental headquarters was moved there from Obrenovac, with battalion headquarters being established in Zvečan, Jošanička Banja, Ušće and Vučitrn. Elements of the 3rd and 5th Regiments fought the Partisans on 4–5 August near the village of Rudnik. The Partisans attacked the positions of the 5th Regiment in Leposavić on 24 August.

In September, the Corps reached its peak of 11,197 members. Several skirmishes occurred between the 1st Regiment and the Partisans in the Zvornik and Valjevo areas that month. On 7/8 September, the 2nd Regiment fought Partisans at the Ibar River, trying to deny them crossing. On 9 September, elements of the 3rd Regiment moved to Požega and on 11 September to Čačak. On 20 September, the 1st Regiment fought a group of Partisans south of Loznica. Major combat between the 1st Regiment and Partisans erupted in Loznica itself on 23 September, causing the regiment to fall back to Šabac with losses of 7 killed and 23 wounded. Combat continued daily throughout September with the 1st Regiment suffering up to 53 casualties per day. On 22 September, combined Soviet Red Army and Bulgarian People's Army forces began entering the occupied territory from the east, and joined Partisan forces as part of the Belgrade Offensive, aimed at capturing the Serbian capital. On 8 October, the 2nd Regiment headquarters in Požarevac was evacuated as Soviet armour approached the town. As parts of the regiment moved towards Belgrade and Grocka, they came into contact with Soviet troops and armour in the Ripanj area south of Belgrade, sustaining heavy casualties. On 10 October the Russian Protective Corps was renamed the "Russian Corps in Serbia". On 15 October, the headquarters of the 4th Regiment was moved to Čačak.

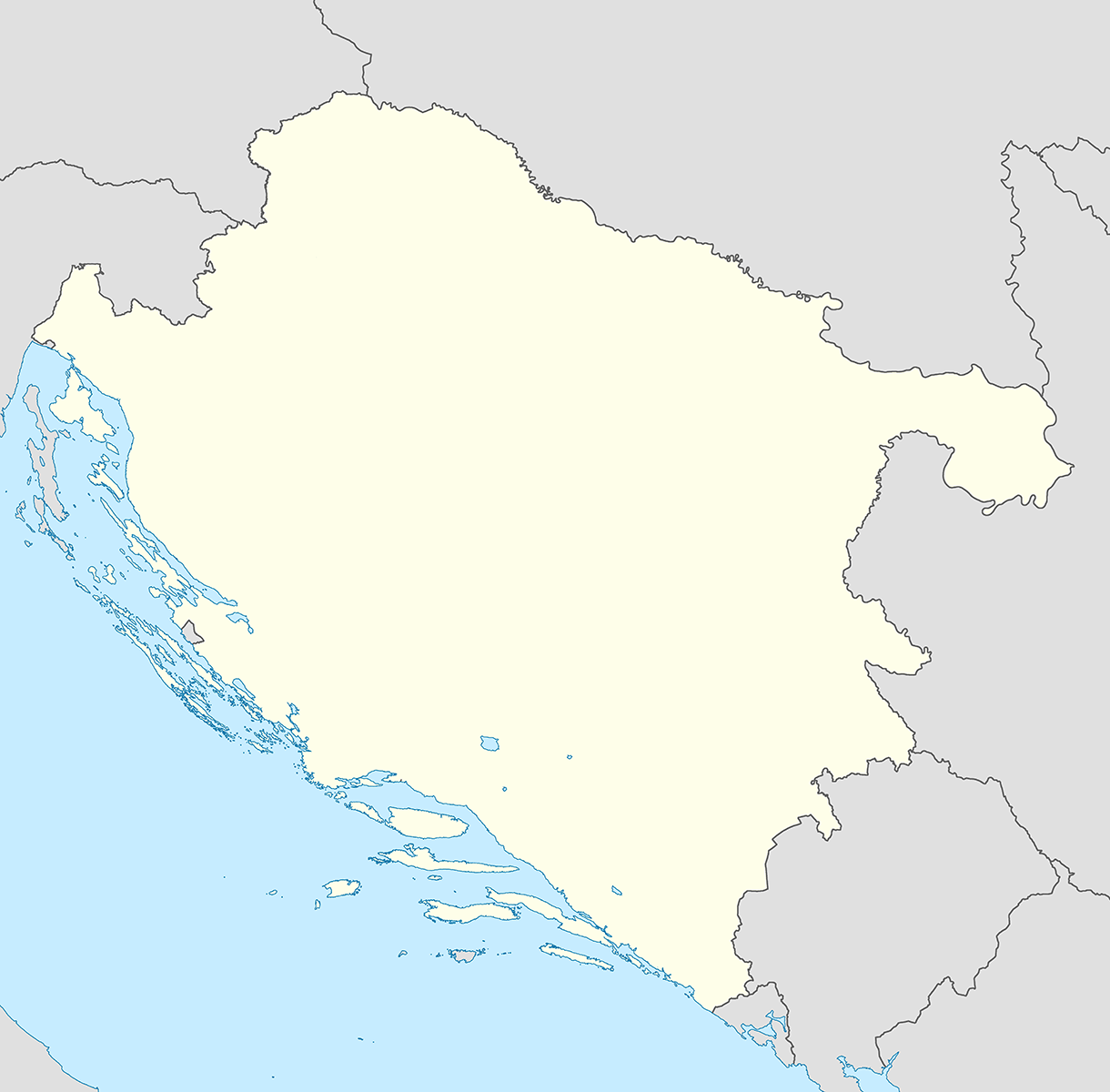
Map of the NDH showing the retreat of the Russian Protective Corps in 1944–1945

Elements of the 2nd Regiment arrived in Šabac on 22 October, then moved to Hrvatska Mitrovica in the NDH on 23 October, Vukovar two days later, Osijek on 26 October and then to Vinkovci and Stari Jankovci two days later. Further parts of the regiment moved to Zemun on 13 October, Ruma on 14 October, Vinkovci on 16 October, and Stari Jankovci on 24 October. On 19–22 October, the 4th Regiment fought advancing Soviet troops and Partisans and defended the Čačak-Kraljevo road. On 23 October, the 1st Regiment abandoned Šabac and Klenak and moved to Laćarak, and then to Tovarnik on 24 October where they were ordered to hold their ground. The 4th Regiment fought in the Čačak area from 27 October to 2 November. It faced the Red Army and the Chetnik 2nd Ravna Gora Corps before being overpowered and forced to abandon the city. The Chetniks captured 339 of its soldiers and turned them over to the Soviets. On 12 November, the 1st Regiment moved via railway through Vinkovci to Brčko, with elements deployed north across the Sava in Gunja. On 8 December it regrouped north of the Sava and on 11–13 December it fought the Partisans in and near the village of Vrbanja, killing forty-three. The 4th Regiment arrived in Sarajevo in the NDH on 13–18 December. Elements subsequently moved to nearby Kiseljak on 18 December, fighting Partisans in the Kiseljak-Busovača area on 26–27 December. During this time, the 1st Regiment and a battalion of the 2nd Regiment guarded a bridgehead north of Brčko in order to allow German forces to withdraw through the town.

In January 1945, elements of the Corps participated in the German capture of Travnik, part of Operation Lawine. Afterwards, they withdrew to Slovenia. On 30 April, Shteifon died while passing through Zagreb, in the Esplanade hotel; Colonel Anatoly Rogozhin took over as commander. On 12 May, Rogozhin surrendered to the British near Klagenfurt. At the time of surrender, the Corps consisted of 4,500 men, according to Puškadija-Ribkin; 3,500 men, according to Granitov. Members of Russian Protective Corps, alongside members of Ustaše Militia and SDK, were exempt from amnesty given by new communist authorities on August 3, because they were volunteers in a fascist unit. Timofejev writes that the Corps consisted of 5,584 men by the end of the war. Between 1941 and 1945, 6,709 of its members were killed, wounded or went missing. In total, 17,090 men served in its ranks over the course of the war. According to Rogozhin, several hundred men and their families, who had fled the camp in Lienz and who were subject to forced repatriation to the USSR, joined the Russian Corps from mid-June 1945 in order to avoid deportation to the Soviet Union. Rogozhin′s men were spared that fate because they were not regarded as Soviet citizens.

Immediately after disarmament and transfer to Austrian territory, the Corps settled in the Viktring International Camp. Next, the Corps moved to a separate camp in the area of Kl. St. Veit - Tigring and received from the British a small amount of small arms to maintain order and protect against partisan attacks. After examining the history of the Corps, the British decided to demobilise it in October. Its members were then sent in the Kellerberg DP Camp northwest of Villach, Austria; Rogozhin on 1 November 1945 issued an order that notified his subordinates of demobilisation. The Corps' badge was a white militia cross, in the middle of which was a Gallipoli cross with the dates "1917-1921, 1941-1945", indicating two periods of the anti-communist struggle. The badge was established by Order to the Russian Corps N100 of July 26, 1945. Those who had the right to wear this sign received a corresponding certificate signed by the commander and with the seal of the Russian Corps. In emigration, these signs were worn in a miniature (“tailcoat”) version or in a large size on the Cossack uniform. Most of the already disarmed ranks of the Russian Corps spent several years in the DP camp Kellerberg (Austria), which gave them the right to wear a second badge for those who were in this camp. Former members of the Corps were subsequently allowed to resettle in the West, mainly in the United States and Argentina. In exile, veterans formed the Union of Officials of the Russian Corps (СЧРК- Союз Чинов Русского Корпуса), registered as the Union of St. Alexander Nevsky.

== Order of battle ==
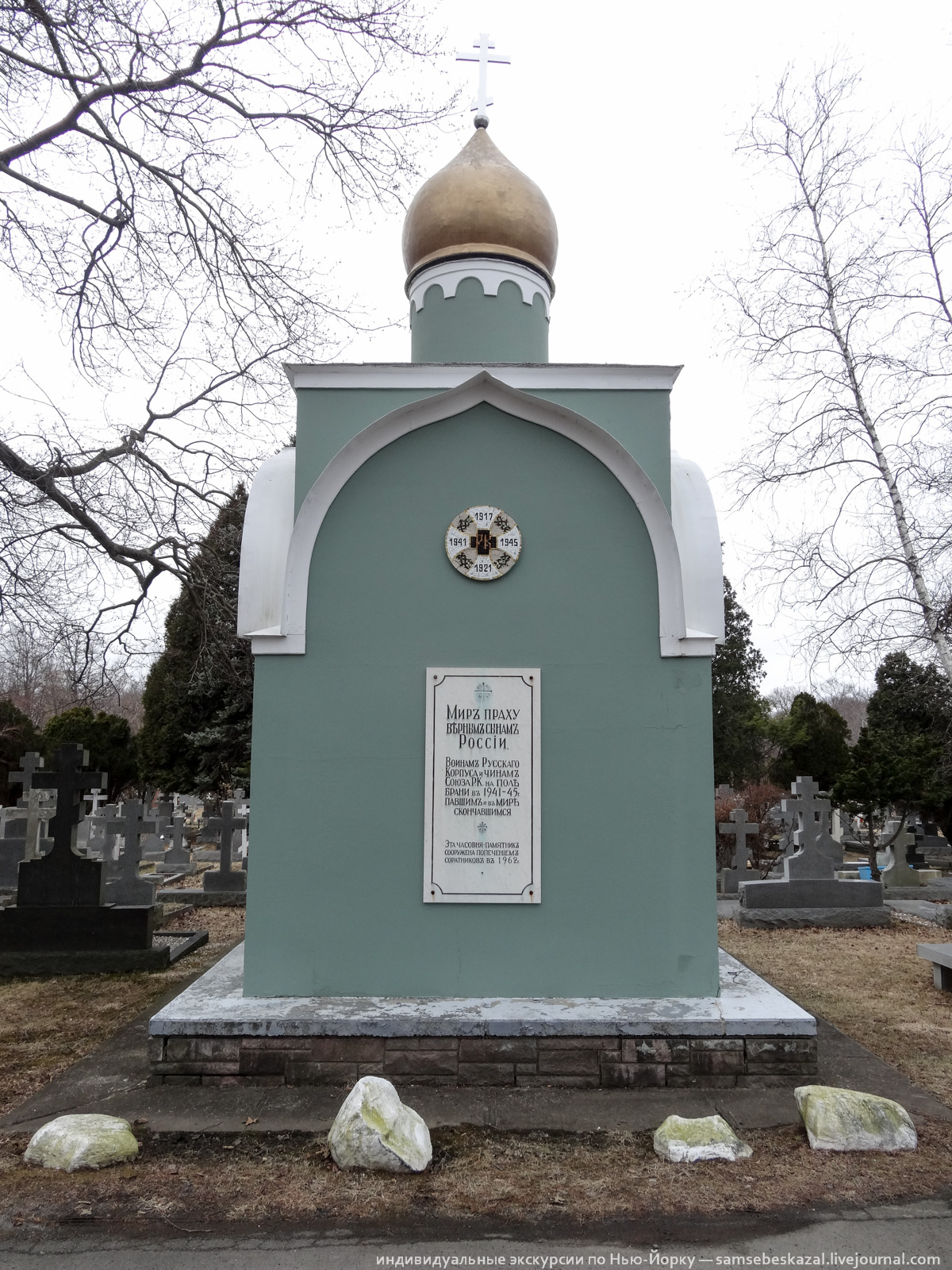
Memorial chapel for the soldiers of the Russian Protective Corps at the Russian Orthodox Novo-Diveevo cemetery

At its maximum strength, the Russian Corps was composed of:

- 1st Cossack Regiment General Zborovski
- Infantry Regiments II, III, IV, V

In May 1942, the Corps was divided into two brigades. The 4th Regiment was disbanded on 30 November 1942, and re-established on 15 December 1943. The 5th Regiment was created on 18 January 1944.

== Commanders ==
The Russian Corps had three commanders during its existence:

No.	Portrait	Commander	Took office	Left office	Time in office
1	Mikhail Skorodumov	General; Mikhail Skorodumov (1892–1963)	12 September 1941	14 September 1941	2 days
2	Boris Shteifon	Lieutenant-General; Boris Shteifon (1881–1945)	15 September 1941	30 April 1945 †	3 years, 227 days
3	Anatoly Rogozhin	Colonel; Anatoly Rogozhin (1893–1972)	30 April 1945	12 May 1945	12 days

== Uniform ==
Members of the Corps wore the uniform of the Russian Imperial Army from 12 September 1941 to 30 November 1942 as well as the Czechoslovak helmet. The uniform was sometimes worn with pips of the Royal Yugoslav Army, alongside special rank insignia on the collar. Wehrmacht uniforms and insignia were adopted on 1 December 1942, but the old uniforms continued to be worn for some time.

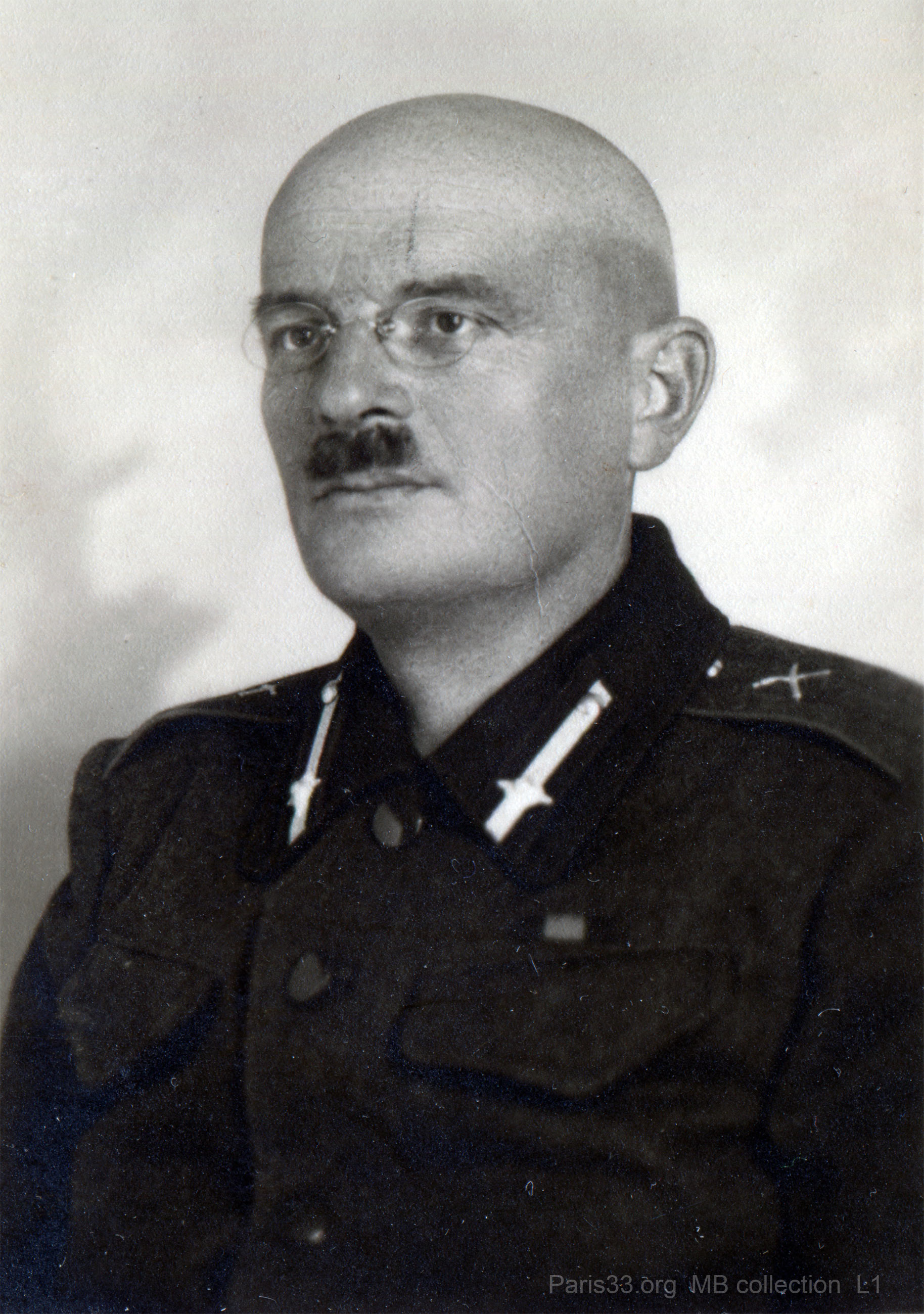
Uniform 1942, shoulder straps of an artillery colonel (WWI) and oberleutnant’s buttonholes (Russian Corps), L1

=== Rank insignia ===
Collar patches and sleeves showed the actual rank in the Corps, while those who have held Tsarist rank wore rank insignia in the form of traditional shoulder straps denoting their former rank. Both types of insignia were improvised using rank stars from the Royal Yugoslav Army.

Rank insignia	Russian	German
	Generalmayor	Generalmajor
	Polkovnik	Oberst
	Podpolkovnik	Oberstleutnant
	Mayor	Major
	Kapitan	Hauptmann
	Poruchik	Oberleutnant
	Podporuchik	Leutnant
	Feldfebel	Feldwebel
	Unterofitzer	Unteroffizier
	Yefreytor	Gefreiter
