= Palace Hotel, Zagreb =

Hotel in Zagreb

Coordinates: 45.80846°N 15.97771°E

Palace Zagreb
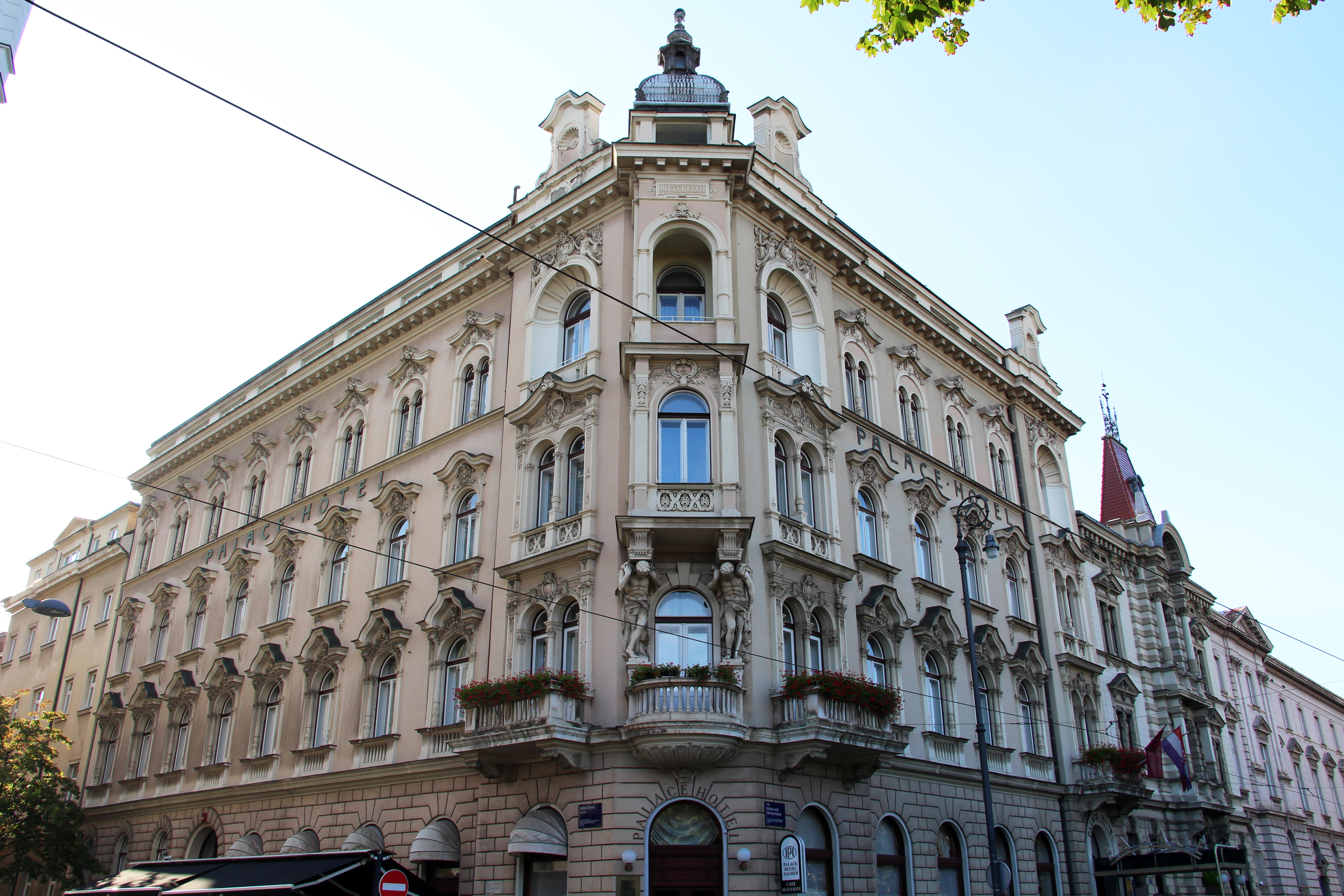
- Facade of the hotel
- Interactive map of the Palace Zagreb area

General information
- Type: Historic hotel
- Classification: 4 stars
- Location: 10 Nikola Šubić Zrinski Square, Zagreb, Croatia
- Opened: 1907
- Affiliation: World Hotels Distinctive Collection

Technical details
- Floor count: 4
- Floor area: 680 m²

Design and construction
- Developer: Hönigsberg & Deutsch

Other information
- Number of rooms: 122
- Number of suites: 6
- Number of restaurants: 1
- Parking: On-site

Website
- https://palace.hr/

Palace Hotel Zagreb is a historic hotel located in Nikola Šubić Zrinski Square in Zagreb, Croatia. The hotel opened in 1907 and is regarded as the first professionally organized hotel in the city.

== History ==
The building was originally constructed in 1891 for Carl Schlesinger, a prominent musician. It opened as a hotel in 1907, making it one of the first professionally managed hotels in Zagreb. The hotel’s architectural style is primarily Neo-Rococo. It is known for its Art Nouveau interior, which is one of the few examples of this style in the region.

In 1920, the hotel hosted the Yugoslav-Hungarian Boundary Commission, a body tasked with determining the border between the Kingdom of Yugoslavia and the Kingdom of Hungary following the First World War and the dissolution of Austria-Hungary. The commission included representatives from several countries, including the United Kingdom, Italy, France, Japan, Yugoslavia, and Hungary.

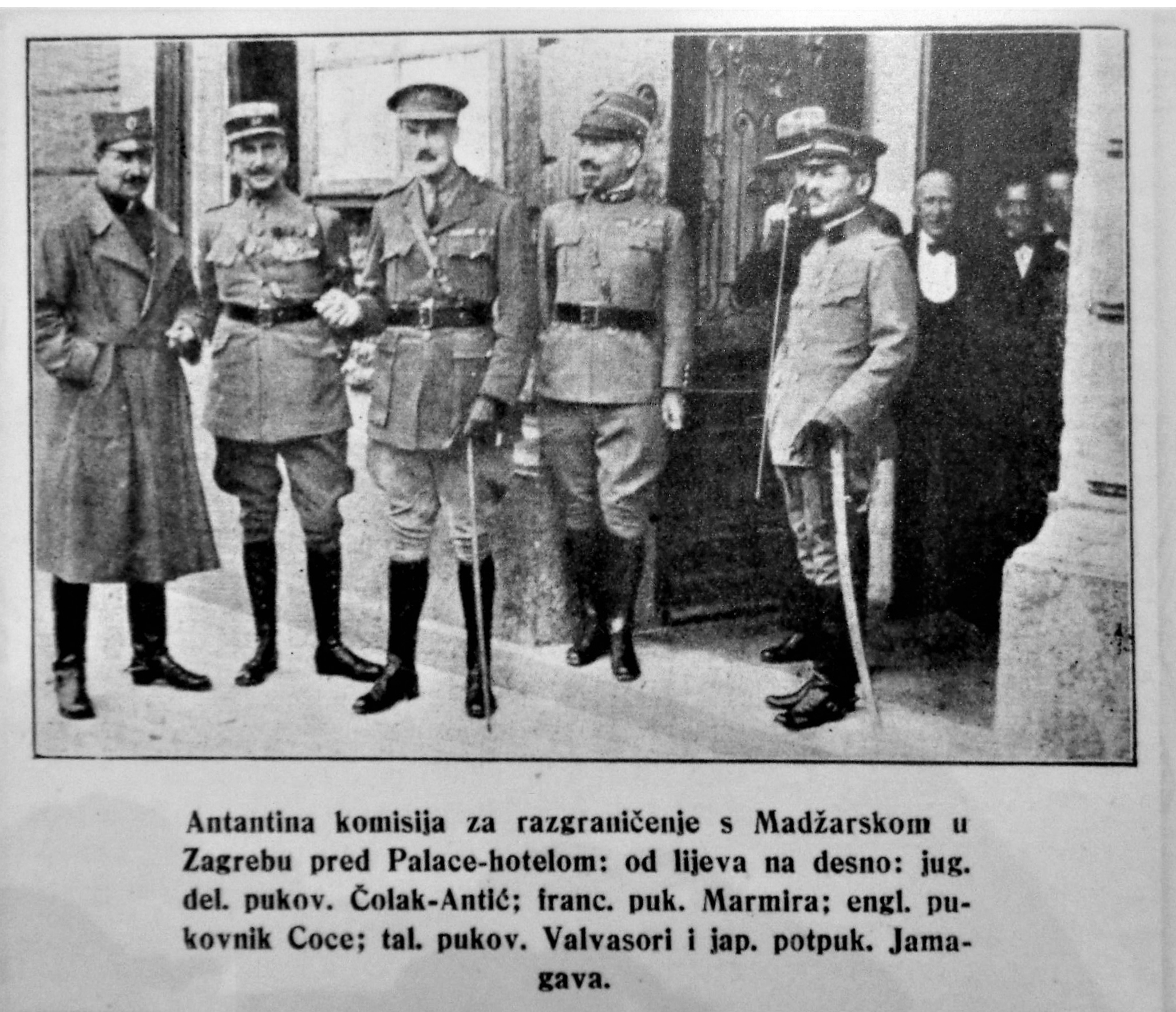
The commissioners at the Palace Hotel, 1920

== Legacy ==
In 2012, the hotel was awarded the "Hotel Baština" (Hotel Heritage) award for its cultural and historical significance to the hospitality industry and the city of Zagreb. Throughout its history, the hotel has hosted numerous dignitaries, public figures, and international guests. These have included Croatian cultural figures such as conductor Berislav Klobučar, and global personalities including actress Sophia Loren and chess grandmaster Bobby Fischer. The hotel is known for local specialty of Zagreb - Štrukli, which is made from dough stretched by hand.

Following the 2020 Zagreb earthquake, the hotel closed for repairs and extensive renovations. As of 2025, the hotel was still under reconstruction.

== Gallery ==
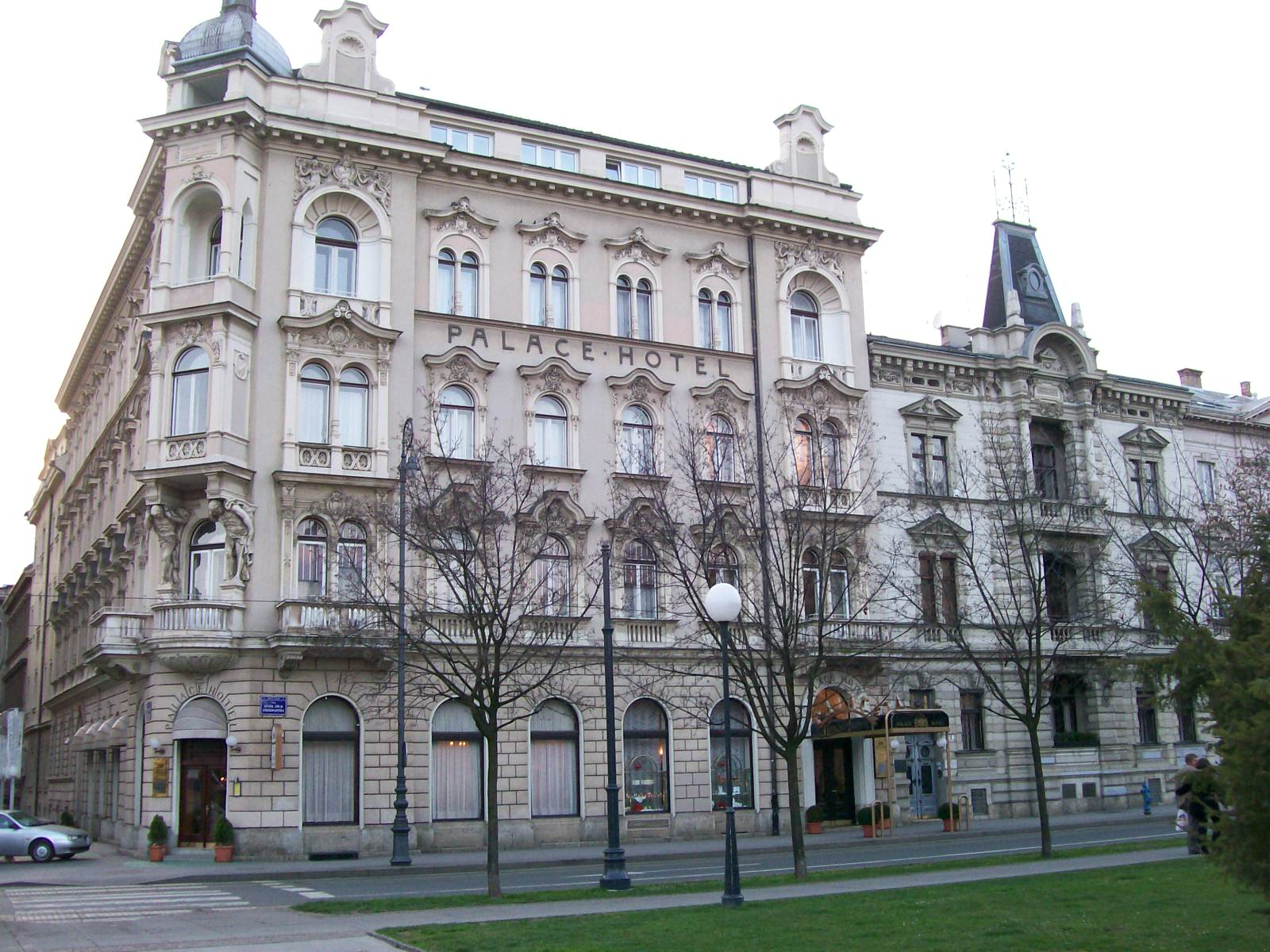
Facade of the building

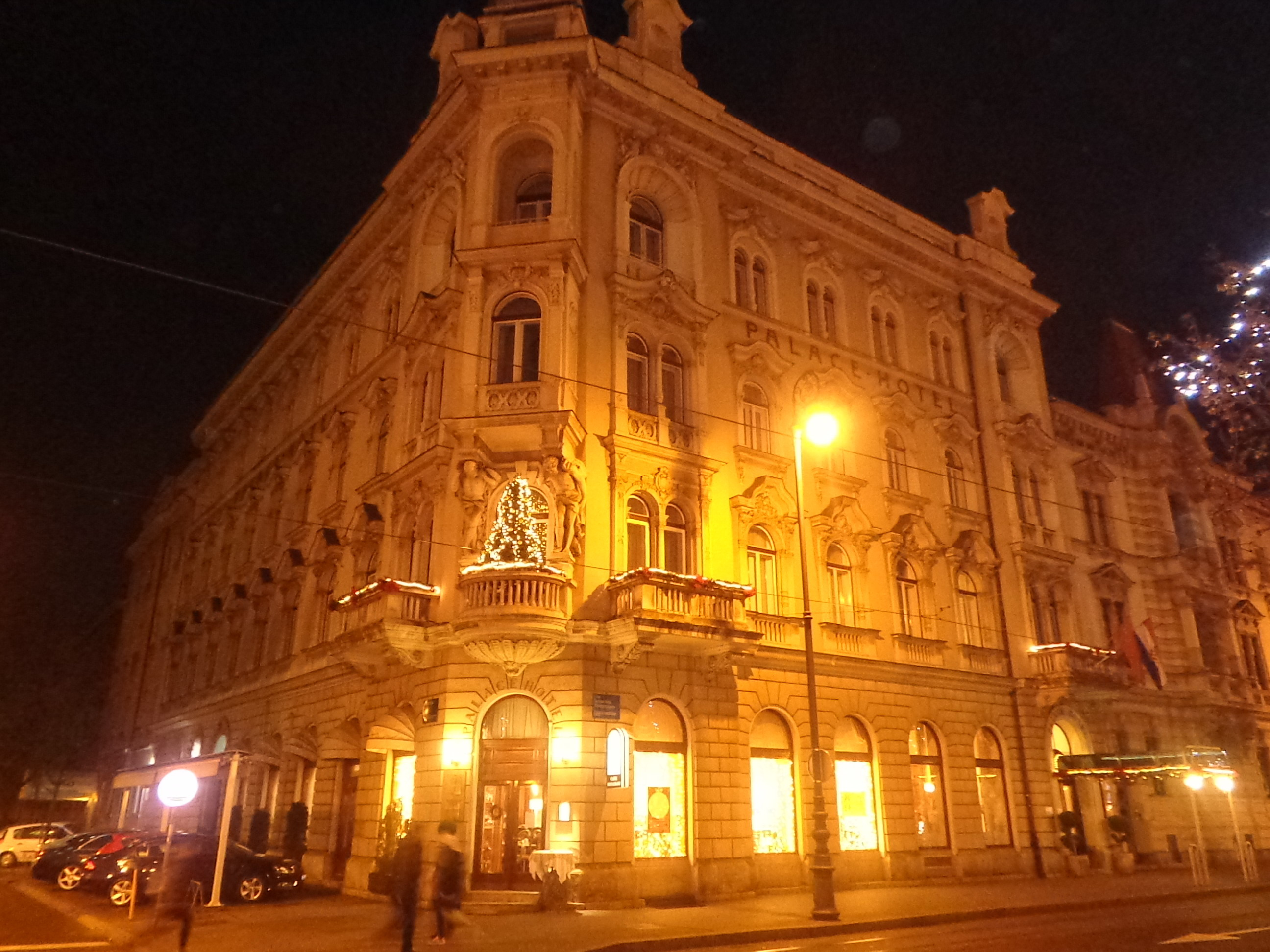
Hotel at night

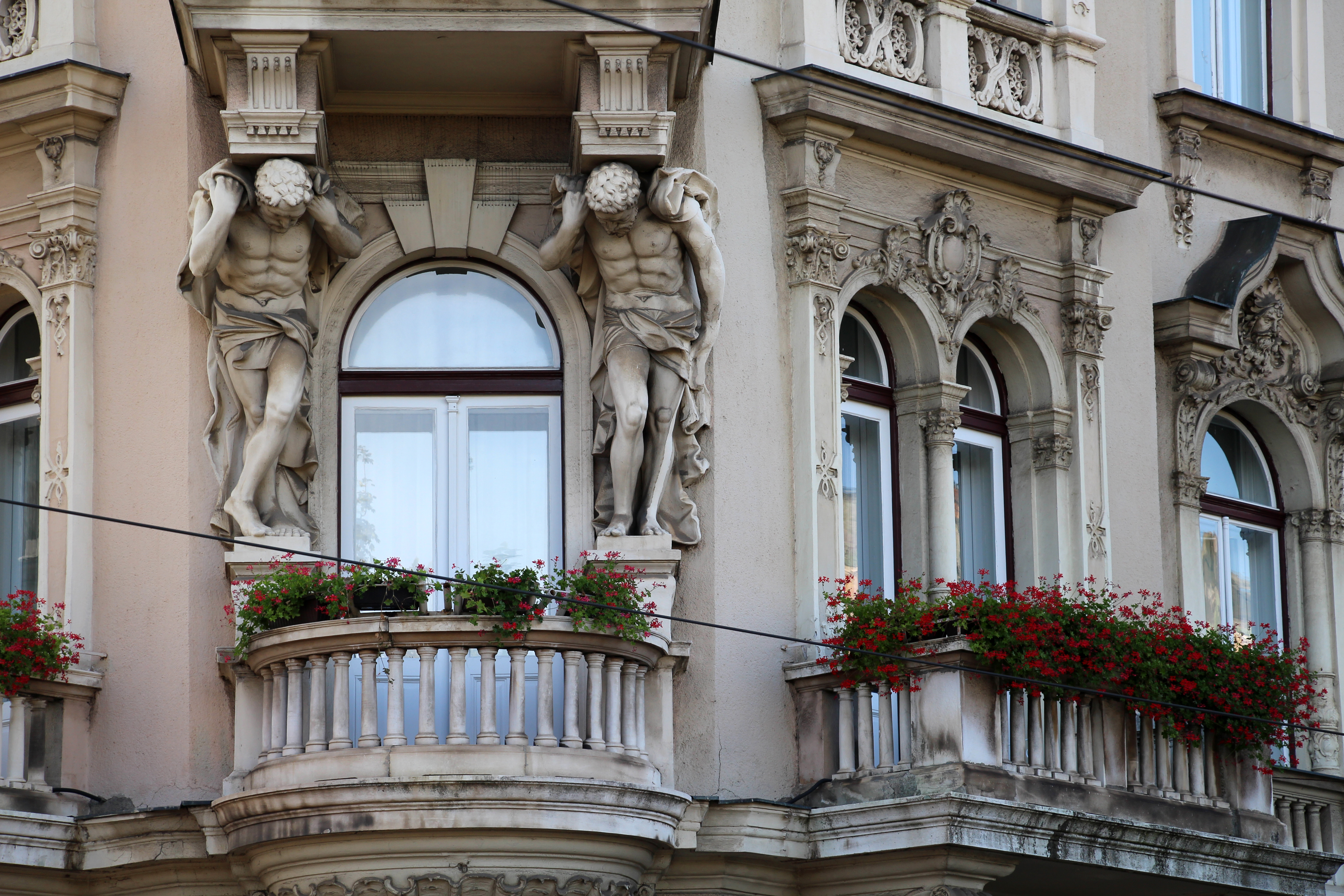
Details of the statues on the hotel's facade

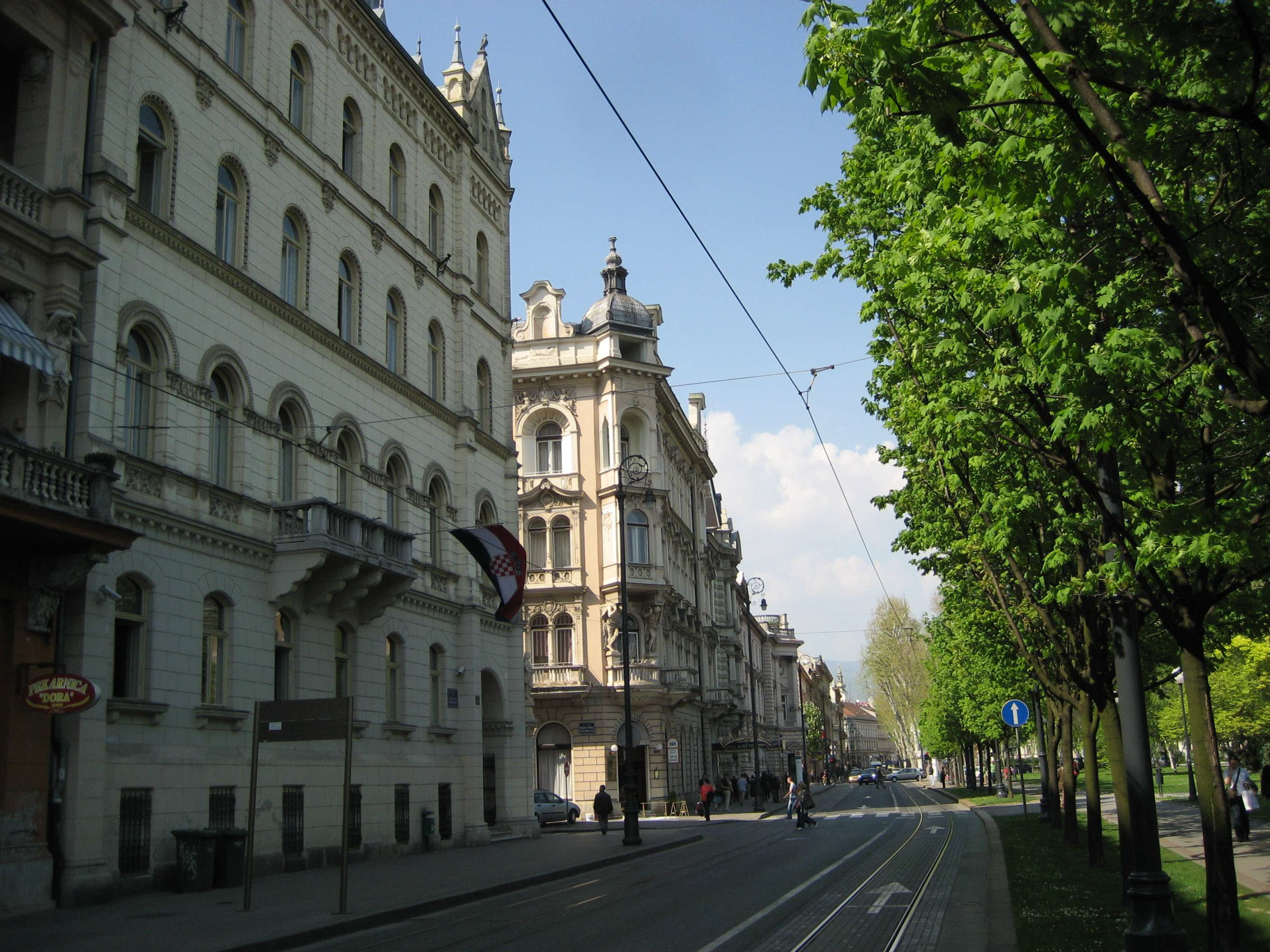
HBOR building on the left and the hotel

== See also ==
- History of Zagreb
- Tourism in Croatia
