= Esplanade Zagreb Hotel =

Hotel in Zagreb, Croatia

Coordinates: 45°48′19″N 15°58′33″E

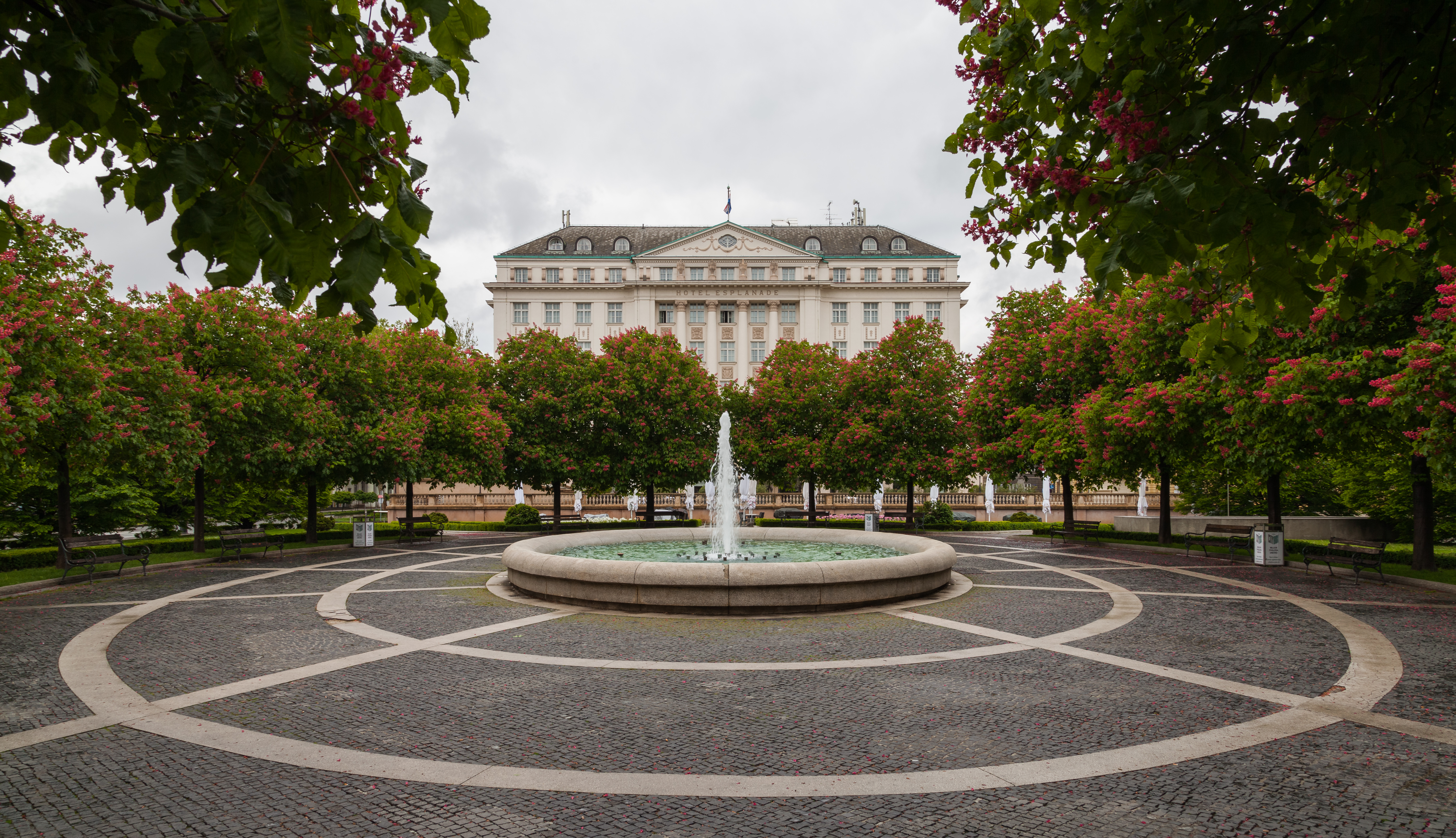
- East side view
- Interactive map of the Esplanade Zagreb Hotel area
- Former names: Esplanade InterContinental Hotel (1964 - 2002); The Regent Esplanade Zagreb (2004 - 2012); The Esplanade Zagreb Hotel (2012 - present)

General information
- Type: Luxury hotel
- Classification: _{Superior}
- Location: 1 Mihanovićeva Street, Zagreb, Croatia
- Opening: April 22, 1925; 100 years ago

Technical details
- Floor count: 5

Other information
- Number of rooms: 208
- Number of restaurants: 2 (Restaurant Zinfandel’s & Le Bistro)

Website
- www.esplanade.hr

The Esplanade Zagreb Hotel is a historic luxury hotel in Zagreb, Croatia. It was built in 1925 to provide accommodation for passengers of the famous Orient Express train, which traveled between Paris and Istanbul. Located on Starčević Square, it's the first luxury hotel in Croatia and one of Zagreb's main landmarks.

== History ==
=== Beginning ===
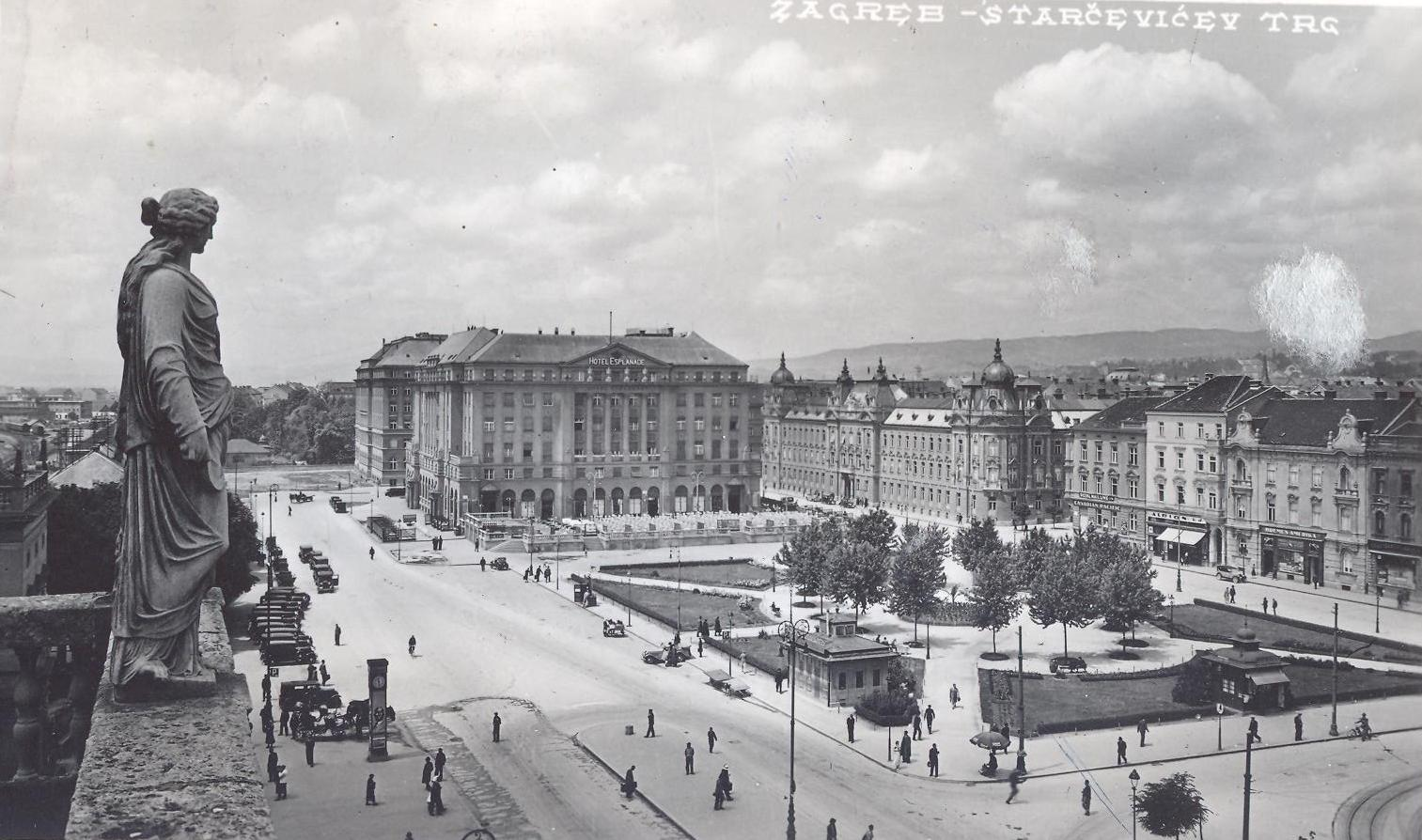
View of the Hotel between 1931 and 1942

At the beginning of the 20th century, the two hotels at the time (Palace Hotel Zagreb and Hotel Jägerhorn) became too small for the increasing number of passengers arriving in Zagreb (then Austria-Hungary) on the famous Orient Express, which traveled from Paris to Istanbul. In order to meet the needs of the developing city, the construction of a new, luxurious hotel became a priority. The hotel was to be built on a wide area (Spanish esplanade), in the immediate vicinity of the railway station - at that time the only connection with Europe and the rest of the world - which was one of the stations of the famous Orient Express on the route Paris-Venice-Istanbul. In 1917, an international tender was announced in which a number of prominent architects participated, including the famous Austrian architect Adolf Loos, who however was not awarded the contract. The winner was Germany's Otto Rehnig, whose original plans were modified by the Zagreb architect Dionis Sunko. Today, most people consider Sunko to have been the architect of this building from the Belle Epoque period. The hotel was given the name "Esplanade," which in its original form has the meaning "field", probably because it was built on a vast plain to the west of the station.

The hotel was completed in 26 months and was opened on 22 April 1925 with over 200 guests attended the grand opening. Among the guests were the mayor of Zagreb, Mr. Vjekoslav Heinzel, consuls, bankers, journalists, as well as many others.

=== 1920s ===
The hotel was the center of Zagreb social life, especially in the 1920s, when it attracted amorous couples. According to legend, the first Croatian striptease party was held there at a farewell celebration for an Italian count. The first striptease took place at an Italian count's farewell party, where caviar and champagne were served, and some of the ladies present decided to get rid of their clothes and shoes, leaving them in only their underwear. It was the Miss Yugoslavia pageant in 1926, organized by "Fanamenta", a film company from Berlin. Famous singers, including Ivo Robić, played in Hotel Esplanade.

Guests at the hotel included Asta Nielsen, a famous silent film star, and the theater and film actress Gitta Alpar, who was so popular in Zagreb that her fans would besiege the train station and the Esplanade for hours. Likewise, crowds awaited the arrival of the queen of Parisian cabaret, singer and dancer, Josephine Baker. The European shoe king, Tomáš Baťa, also stayed at the hotel, as did the greatest film lover of the time, Vladimir Gaidarov. Other guests include; Charles Lindbergh, Jules Romains, Abbas II of Egypt and others.

=== II World War ===
During World War II, Esplanade was used by the Gestapo and the Wehrmacht. At the numerous parties that the Germans organized in the hotel, the most closely guarded information could be obtained. The war atmosphere was best described by the Italian writer, Curzio Malaparte, in his novella “Kaputt”. During 1943, he was a war correspondent for a Roman newspaper from Zagreb. Following the German surrender in 1945, the hotel was used as a soup kitchen for starving residents.

=== Renovations and chain join ===
Esplanade was renovated for the first time in 1957. One of the first guests of the renovated Esplanade was the famous Italian tenor Mario del Monaco, Arthur Rubinstein, Silvana Pampanini, Yul Brynner, Jack Palance, Rossana Podestà, Belinda Lee, Liana Orfei, Orson Welles, Anita Ekberg and many other eminent artists stayed at the Esplanade. Giuseppe de Santis, who was filming the film "The Road a Year Long", stayed at the hotel for several weeks. For short period of time, The Emerald Ball room was used as diplomatic gathering for politicians and important people such as Queen Elizabeth II, Nikita Khrushchev, Leonid Brezhnev, Norodom Sihanouk, Richard Nixon, Aldo Moro, Milton Obote,

On November 6, 1964, the hotel joined Pan Am's Inter-Continental Hotels chain, following a $1 million renovation, and was renamed Hotel Esplanade Intercontinental. In 1966, the name was adjusted slightly, to Hotel Esplanade Inter-Continental, when the chain was renamed. In 1967, first casino in Croatia was opened. The brand-new Inter-Continental Zagreb (today The Westin Zagreb), opened in 1975 and the Esplanade left the chain at the same time. The hotel also received a medal from President Josip Broz Tito in 1975, with a golden wreath. Throughout the 20th century, the hotel was the site of key social events of the Croatian capital.

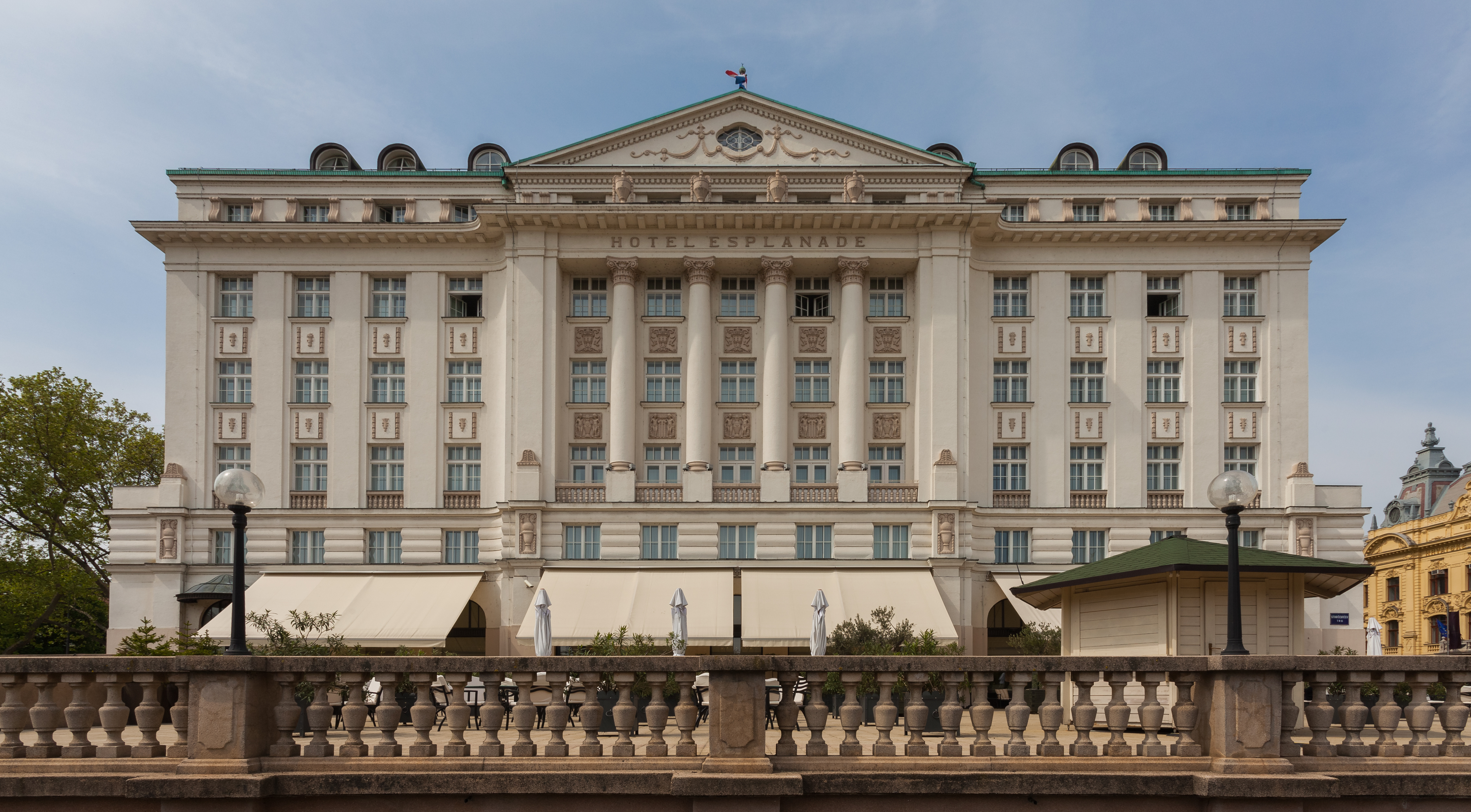
Facade

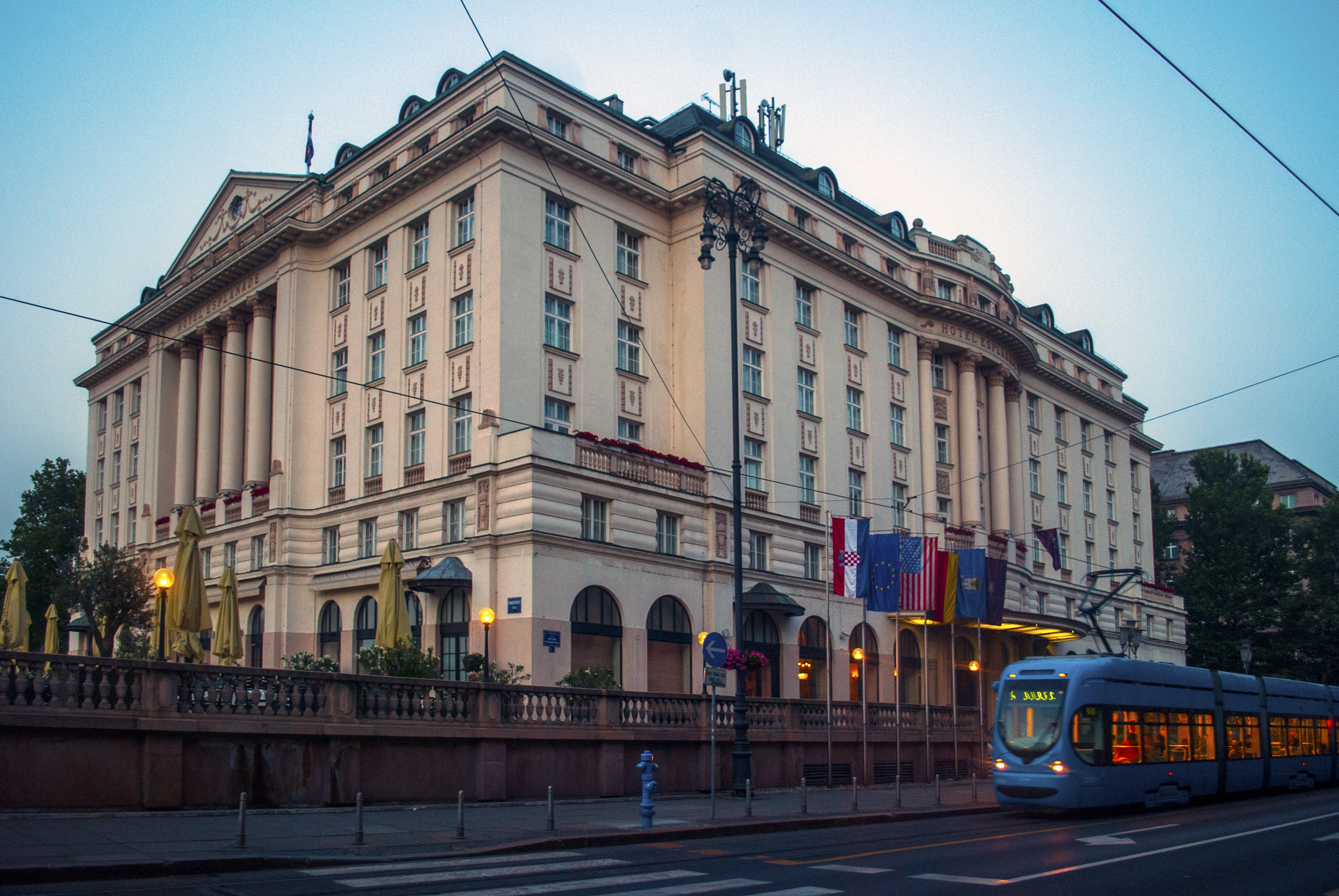
Hotel Esplanade at dawn

Many world famous personalities have stayed there, including Charles Lindbergh, Josephine Baker, Laurence Olivier, Vivien Leigh, Woody Allen, Queen Elizabeth II, Elizabeth Taylor, Richard Nixon, Emir of Qatar, Prince Albert of Monaco, Hillary Clinton, Nikita Khrushchev, Alfred Hitchcock, Louis Armstrong, Ella Fitzgerald, Catherine Deneuve, Orson Welles, Richard Burton, Yves Montand, Cliff Richard, Iron Maiden, Mick Jagger and The Rolling Stones, Ike and Tina Turner, David Beckham, Cristiano Ronaldo, Guns n Roses, Depeche Mode, Sting, Orlando Bloom, Shakira, and many others.

In the 1990s, the hotel was privatized, and in 2002 it was acquired by the Austrian WSF-Gruppe. In 1996, Esplanade is the first Croatian hotel to have its own website. The hotel closed in 2002 for a major renovation, and reopened on 18 May 2004 as The Regent Esplanade Zagreb. The hotel left the Regent chain in 2012 and operates independently since that year.

Esplanade Zagreb Hotel has a long list of awards and acknowledges for impeccable service, exceptional cuisine and sophisticated interior design based on reviews of experts and guests that it had the pleasure to accommodate.

- Esplanade Zagreb Hotel was named the Best European Historic Hotel of the Year at the Prestigious European Hotel Awards 2019 in Geneva.
- The Haute Grandeur Global Award presented the Esplanade with awards for hotel business practice, Zinfandel’s Restaurant and the Health Club in several categories.
- Chef Ana Grgic’s risotto was named one of the 101 best in the world by Riso Gallo Gastro Guide. Zinfandel’s restaurant has been feted in the Fodor’s Choice and received Michelin Guide recommendation as well as our chic Le Bistro restaurant – the only hotel restaurants in Croatia.
- In 2012, it was named the Best Hotel in Croatia in all three categories (the best hotel, the best service and the best luxury hotel) by TripAdvisor.

== In popular culture ==
- The hotel was the filming site for the 1983 miniseries The Winds of War and the 1988 television film The Great Escape II: The Untold Story.
- The exterior and interior scenes were filmed for Canary Black with Kate Beckinsale and Rupert Friend in lead roles in 2022.
- In 2014, the hotel was used in first episode of Croatian TV-series Crno-bijeli svijet.
- In 2003, Croatian singer Nina Badrić filmed music video for her song "Ti ne znaš kako je".
- In 1975, Elena Tessadri, an Italian writer, wrote a book titled "Esplanade". The romantic love story is set in the Esplanade.
- In 1944, Italian writer, Curzio Malaparte mentions the hotel in his novella “Kaputt”
