= Boris Shteifon =

Russian lieutenant general and Nazi collaborator (1881–1945)

Boris Aleksandrovich Shteifon
- Борис Александрович Штейфон
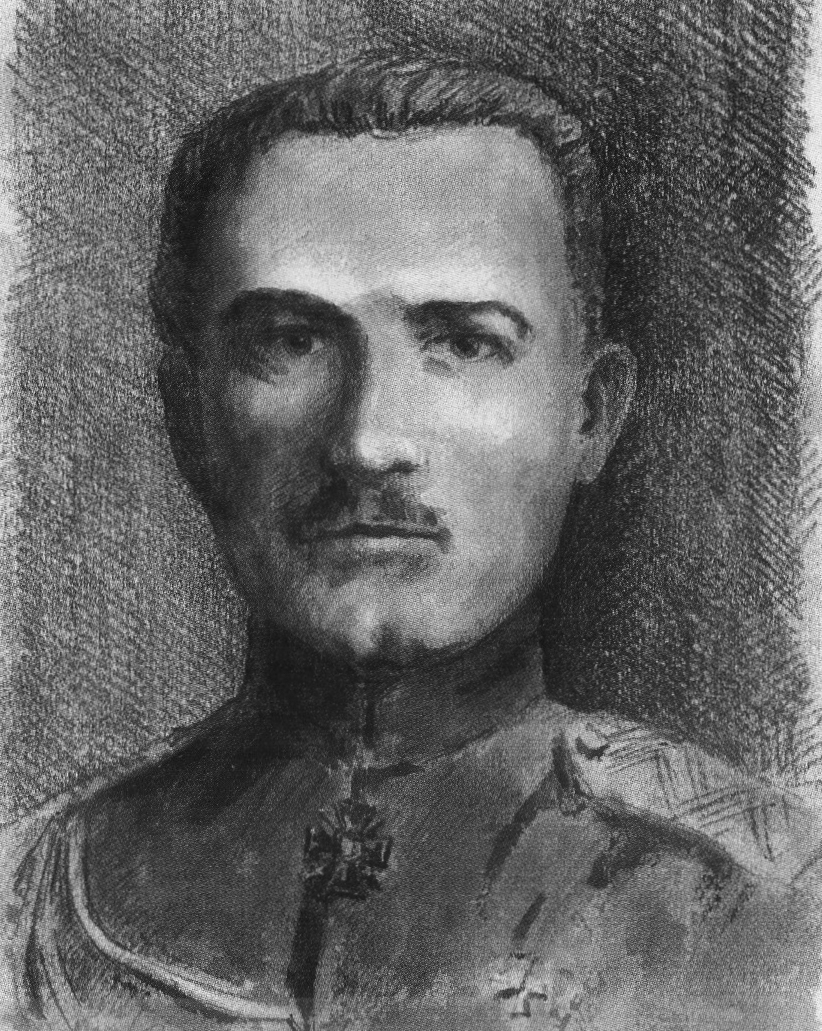
- General Shteifon in 1920
- Born: 6 December 1881; Kharkov, Russian Empire
- Died: 30 April 1945 (aged 63); Zagreb, Independent State of Croatia
- Military career
- Allegiance: Russian Empire; Nazi Germany; KONR
- Branch: Russian Imperial Army; Volunteer Army; Russian Corps
- Service years: 1902–1945
- Rank: Lieutenant general
- Conflicts: Russo-Japanese War; World War I Russian Civil War; World War II

Boris Aleksandrovich Shteifon (Russian: Борис Александрович Штейфон; 6 December 1881 – 30 April 1945) was a Russian lieutenant general in the Imperial Russian Army, who subsequently served as a general in the anti-communist White Army, and as the leader of the Nazi-allied Russian Corps in the German occupied territory of Serbia during World War II in Yugoslavia.

== Biography ==
Boris Shteifon was born in 1881 in Kharkov (now in Ukraine). His father was a Jewish merchant converted to Orthodox Christianity, his mother was the daughter of a Russian Orthodox deacon. He graduated from the Chuguyivske Junker Infantry School, one of the premier schools of the Imperial Russian Army, and went to serve as a second lieutenant in the 124th Infantry Regiment based at Voronezh. He first saw combat in the Russo-Japanese War of 1904–1905, during which he was injured with a concussion. He was also awarded for bravery and excellence five times, receiving the Order of St. Vladimir along with other decorations. He was promoted to lieutenant in September 1905. In 1911, Shteifon completed the Imperial Nicholas Military Academy with the rank of captain. He was subsequently assigned to serve in Russian Turkestan, and was a staff officer of the 2nd Turkistan Army Corps in 1914.

With the start of World War I, Shteifon served on the Caucasus front against the forces of the Ottoman Empire. He was Assistant Chief of Intelligence in the staff of the Russian Caucasian Army, and was promoted to lieutenant colonel in 1915. He played a key role in the Battle of Erzurum under General Nikolai Yudenich and was awarded the Order of St. Anne and Order of St. George for conducting intelligence operations. In January 1917 he was appointed Chief of Staff of the 161 Infantry Division and then in August of that year, the head of the Finnish 3rd Infantry Division. In 1917 he was promoted to colonel.

In the wake of the October Revolution and the collapse at the Russian front, Shteifon returned to his native Kharkov where he headed an underground organization to recruit and relay officers who wanted to join the Volunteer Army. In the fall of 1918 he arrived at Volunteer Army headquarters in Ekaterinodar. He became Chief of Staff of the 3rd Infantry Division of the Volunteer Army in April 1919, and commander of the 13th Infantry Regiment from July. He was active in operations throughout Ukraine and parts of Poland and Romania through the end of the year. In January 1920 Shteifon was promoted to the rank of lieutenant general.

However, with the growing collapse of the White movement, he was forced to evacuate into Poland with his men, then arrived in Crimea to continue active duty under General Pyotr Wrangel. He evacuated with the remnants of Wrangel's forces to Constantinople and arrived to the Gallipoli camp for White Russian refugees. On 25 April 1921, he was put in charge of the exiled 1st Army Corps, and relocated to Bulgaria. In 1922, the Bulgarian government expelled Shteifon, and he found refuge in the Kingdom of Serbs, Croats, and Slovenes. Living in Belgrade, he actively participated in the Officers' Union, but was removed by General Wrangel for insubordination. During the 1920s and 1930s, Shteifon published a series of military tactical and historical works, and became a professor of military sciences.

After occupation of the Kingdom of Yugoslavia by Nazi Germany in April 1941, Shteifon was offered a position of chief of staff of the Russian Corps organized in Belgrade on 12 September by the Germans on the initiative of former Russian general Mikhail Skorodumov and became its commander three days later. Until the spring of 1944, the principal task of the Russian Corps, which was mainly composed of former servicemen of the Russian Imperial Army and the White Army, was to guard certain sites and areas from the Communist partisans led by Josip Broz Tito, who were supported by the USSR and later in the war also by Britain; in 1944 the Corps was actively engaged in fighting against Tito's partisans; and finally, from September 1944, after the previously Germany-allied Romania and Bulgaria switched sides and regular units of the Red Army advanced into the Western Balkans, the Corps also fought against the regular Soviet troops in Serbia and later in what is now Croatia.

He died in Zagreb's Esplanade hotel on 30 April 1945. Some sources suggest that he may have committed suicide.

He was buried in Ljubljana, Slovenia, at a German military cemetery (block VIII, row 6, grave 16).
