= Demographics of Zagreb =

- Population pyramid of the City of Zagreb in 2021
- Population: 767,131 (2021)

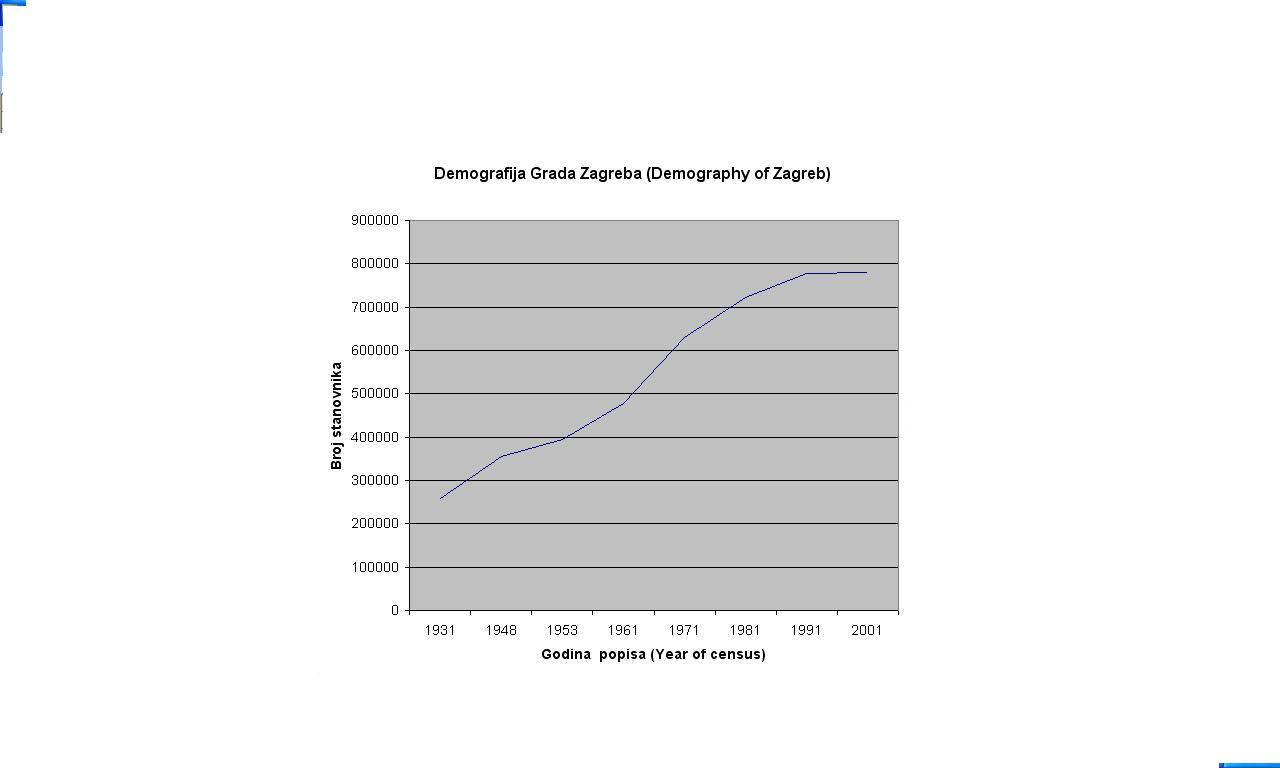
Census population of Zagreb by year.

Zagreb is the largest city in Croatia and the only one whose metropolitan area exceeds one million people. The official population of the city of Zagreb is 790,017 according to the 2011 census. According to the same census, there are 1,088,841 people in the Zagreb metropolitan area including the towns of Samobor, Velika Gorica and Zaprešić.

== Overview ==
According to the local police register department, which bases its information on the number of the applicants who wish to register to vote in Zagreb, in 2005 the city had a population of 973,667.

Most people live in the city proper. The official 2011 census counted 790,017 residents,

Zagreb metropolitan area population is slightly above 1.2 million inhabitants, as it includes the Zagreb County. In 1997, the City of Zagreb itself was given special County status, separating it from Zagreb County, although it remains the administrative center of both.

The majority of its citizens are Croats making up 92% of the city's population (2001 census). The same census records 60,066 residents belonging to ethnic minorities. Such ethnic minorities comprise: 18,811 Serbs (2.41%), 8,030 ethnic Muslims (1.02%), 6,389 Albanians (0.83%), 6,204 Bosniaks (0.80%), 3,946 Romani (0.55%), 3,225 Slovenes (0.41%), 2,315 Macedonians (0.27%), 2,131 Montenegrins (0.27%), together with other smaller minor ethnic communities, especially the historically present Germans.

Below is the demographic data of Zagreb from the 2011 census.

== Ethnicities ==
Source: Croatian Central Bureau of Statistics, Census 2001

Ethnicity	Number	Percentage
Croats	716,344	91.94%
Serbs	18,811	2.41%
Bosniaks	6,204	0.80%
Albanians	3,389	0.43%
Slovenes	3,225	0.41%
Romani	1,946	0.25%
Macedonians	1,315	0.17%
Montenegrins	1,313	0.17%
Hungarians	841	0.11%
Czechs	813	0.10%
Jews	368	0.05%
Ukrainians	333	0.04%
Germans	288	0.04%
Italians	277	0.04%
Russians	250	0.03%
Slovaks	171	0.02%
Poles	133	0.02%
Ruthenians	123	0.02%
Bulgarians	110	0.01%
Turks	65	0.01%
Austrians	53	0.01%
Romanians	37	0.00%
Vlachs	1	0.00%
Non committed	15,649	2.02%
Other ^{1}	4,764	0.61%
Unknown	2,322	0.30%
Total	790.017	100%

^{1} This mode includes, among others:

Ethnicity	Number	Percentage
ethnic Muslims	4,030	0.52%
Yugoslavs	36	0.00%

== Religions ==
Source: Croatian Central Bureau of Statistics, Census 2001

Religion	Number	Percentage
Roman Catholic	678,538	87.09%
Islam	16,215	2.08%
Eastern Orthodox Church	15,634	2.01%
Jehovah's Witness	1,500	0.19%
Greek Catholic	807	0.10%
Evangelical Church	569	0.07%
Adventist Church	459	0.06%
Judaism	323	0.04%
Baptist Church	310	0.04%
Pentecostal Church	141	0.02%
Calvinist Church	42	0.01%
Old Catholic	39	0.01%
Methodist Church	2	0.00%
Other religions	1,393	0.18%
Agnostic & uncommitted	31,645	4.06%
Non-believers	27,617	3.54%
Unknown	3,911	0.50%
Total	790.017	100%
