= 1991 Croatian census =

The 1991 population census in Croatia was the last census of the population of Croatia taken before the Croatian War of Independence. It was conducted by the Croatian Bureau of Statistics during the final week of March 1991. For the 1991 census there were 106 municipalities of which five were part of Zagreb.

== Population by ethnicity ==
- TOTAL = 4,784,265
- Croats = 3,736,356 (78.1%)
- Serbs = 581,663 (12.2%)
- Yugoslavs = 106,041 (2.2%)
- ethnic Muslims = 43,469 (0.9%)
- Slovenes = 22,376 (0.5%)
- Hungarians = 22,355 (0.5%)
- Italians = 21,303 (0.4%)
- Czechs = 13,086 (0.3%)
- Albanians = 12,032 (0.3%)
- Montenegrins = 9,724 (0.2%)
- Romani = 6,695 (0.1%)
- Macedonians = 6,280 (0.1%)
- Slovaks = 6,606 (0.1%)
- Rusyns 3,253 (0.1%)
- Germans = 2,635 (0.1%)
- Ukrainians = 2,494
- Romanians = 810
- Russians = 706
- Poles = 679
- Jews = 600
- Bulgarians = 458
- Turks = 320
- Greeks = 281
- Austrians = 214
- Vlachs and Morlachs = 22
- others = 3,012
- unspecified = 73,376
- regional affiliation = 45,493
- unknown = 62,926

=== By municipality ===
Ethnic composition of Croatia, by municipalities, 1991. Census
municipality	total	Croats	Serbs	Yugoslavs	ethnic Muslims	others
total	4,784,265 (100.00%)	3,736,356 (78.09%)	581,663 (12.15%)	106,041 (2.21%)	43,469 (0.90%)	316,736 (6.62%)
City of Zagreb	933,914	803,681	49,965	16,067	13,100	51,101
* City of Zagreb (central area)	729,467	615,473	45,054	14,321	11,402	43,217
* Samobor	47,743	45,086	524	279	149	1,705
* Sesvete	51,128	47,089	1,206	412	644	1,777
* Velika Gorica	63,494	57,095	2,352	787	697	2,563
* Zaprešić	42,082	38,938	829	268	208	1,839
Beli Manastir	54,265	22,740	13,851	4,265	160	13,249
Benkovac	33,378	13,553	18,986	154	25	660
Biograd na Moru	17,661	16,260	679	150	34	538
Bjelovar	66,039	53,113	5,898	2,631	88	4,309
Brač	13,824	12,985	182	137	61	459
Buje	23,877	9,422	1,000	787	643	12,025
Buzet	7,439	4,419	58	78	108	2,776
Cres-Lošinj	11,796	8,917	777	469	254	1,379
Crikvenica	19,154	16,288	913	539	284	1,130
Čabar	5,169	4,740	64	40	16	309
Čakovec	119,866	112,660	421	625	76	6,084
Čazma	15,263	13,897	685	234	24	423
Daruvar	30,092	10,459	10,074	1,653	62	7,844
Delnice	17,848	16,072	614	241	176	745
Donja Stubica	30,760	30,197	82	76	29	376
Donji Lapac	8,054	44	7,854	65	22	69
Donji Miholjac	20,365	17,033	2,404	348	10	570
Drniš	24,169	18,732	4,974	76	21	366
Dubrovnik	71,419	58,836	4,765	1,189	2,866	3,763
Duga Resa	30,485	27,253	1,978	141	39	1,074
Dugo Selo	19,693	17,342	773	236	172	1,170
Dvor	14,555	1,395	12,591	311	31	227
Đakovo	52,954	48,578	2,002	393	43	1,938
Đurđevac	40,901	39,700	204	198	15	784
Garešnica	18,442	14,297	2,058	556	16	1,515
Glina	23,040	8,041	13,975	473	62	489
Gospić	29,049	18,613	8,976	513	76	871
Gračac	10,434	1,697	8,371	111	9	246
Grubišno Polje	14,206	6,015	4,540	636	8	3,007
Hvar	11,459	10,511	207	179	103	459
Imotski	39,052	37,130	1,140	66	12	704
Ivanec	41,680	40,844	99	50	12	675
Ivanić-Grad	25,592	24,034	334	354	68	802
Jastrebarsko	32,422	31,160	367	176	57	662
Karlovac	81,319	51,880	21,732	2,764	486	4,457
Kaštela	32,286	29,713	879	256	197	1,241
Klanjec	10,917	10,588	43	27	5	254
Knin	42,954	3,886	37,888	502	31	647
Koprivnica	61,052	54,886	3,066	1,084	95	1,921
Korčula	19,651	18,076	206	328	104	937
Korenica	11,393	1,996	8,585	385	93	334
Kostajnica	14,851	4,295	9,343	581	119	513
Krapina	26,382	25,963	51	25	7	336
Križevci	39,248	37,112	927	402	30	777
Krk	16,402	14,379	496	302	272	953
Kutina	39,520	32,772	3,105	781	161	2,701
Labin	25,983	11,545	523	534	2,013	11,368
Lastovo	1,228	991	51	43	25	118
Ludbreg	21,848	21,171	168	109	8	392
Makarska	21,041	18,657	418	677	185	1,104
Metković	22,818	21,292	749	160	83	534
Našice	40,829	32,891	4,486	750	88	2,614
Nova Gradiška	60,749	43,692	12,572	1,810	100	2,575
Novi Marof	29,254	28,826	54	34	7	333
Novska	24,696	16,556	5,402	675	58	2,005
Obrovac	11,557	3,761	7,572	53	15	156
Ogulin	29,095	17,566	10,113	580	62	774
Omiš	25,784	25,066	112	77	77	452
Opatija	29,799	23,574	1,153	825	246	4,001
Orahovica	15,631	10,907	3,328	540	38	818
Osijek	165,253	110,934	33,146	8,351	711	12,111
Otočac	24,992	16,355	7,781	183	26	647
Ozalj	14,787	13,908	142	167	4	566
Pag	7,612	7,259	53	27	17	256
Pakrac	27,589	9,896	12,813	1,346	37	3,497
Pazin	19,006	15,026	100	192	63	3,625
Petrinja	35,565	15,790	15,969	1,814	424	1,568
Ploče	13,008	11,091	551	439	221	706
Podravska Slatina	31,227	17,898	11,212	1,092	47	978
Poreč	22,988	12,535	900	647	281	8,625
Pregrada	16,939	16,509	21	23	11	375
Pula	85,326	47,359	6,424	4,642	2,838	24,063
Rab	9,562	8,861	120	98	51	432
Rijeka	206,229	148,046	21,669	8,014	5,659	22,841
Rovinj	19,727	11,290	749	421	278	6,989
Senj	9,205	8,549	207	27	30	392
Sinj	60,210	55,789	2,785	332	65	1,239
Sisak	84,348	54,621	19,209	3,719	2,452	4,347
Slavonska Požega	71,745	57,277	9,759	1,546	90	3,073
Slavonski Brod	114,249	97,379	7,385	3,307	446	5,732
Slunj	18,962	12,091	5,540	239	509	583
Solin	27,402	26,224	481	117	61	519
Split	207,147	181,356	8,703	5,100	1,228	10,760
Sveti Ivan Zelina	17,152	16,734	80	46	24	268
Šibenik	85,002	71,386	8,971	1,010	278	3,357
Trogir	22,168	20,444	278	254	148	1,044
Valpovo	33,108	30,000	947	679	29	1,453
Varaždin	94,373	89,728	1,055	712	128	2,750
Vinkovci	98,445	78,313	13,170	1,882	342	4,738
Virovitica	46,661	35,850	7,271	1,214	79	2,247
Vis	4,354	3,825	101	140	34	254
Vojnić	8,236	116	7,366	158	436	160
Vrbovec	28,074	26,397	552	181	41	903
Vrbovsko	7,528	4,274	2,594	253	49	358
Vrginmost	16,599	4,043	11,729	278	123	426
Vrgorac	7,497	7,268	15	42	11	161
Vukovar	84,189	36,910	31,445	6,124	253	9,457
Zabok	36,309	35,484	99	87	24	615
Zadar	136,572	113,170	14,112	1,875	418	6,997
Zlatar-Bistrica	31,291	30,712	67	62	10	440
Županja	49,026	42,960	1,209	680	2,106	2,071
