= Demographics of Croatia =

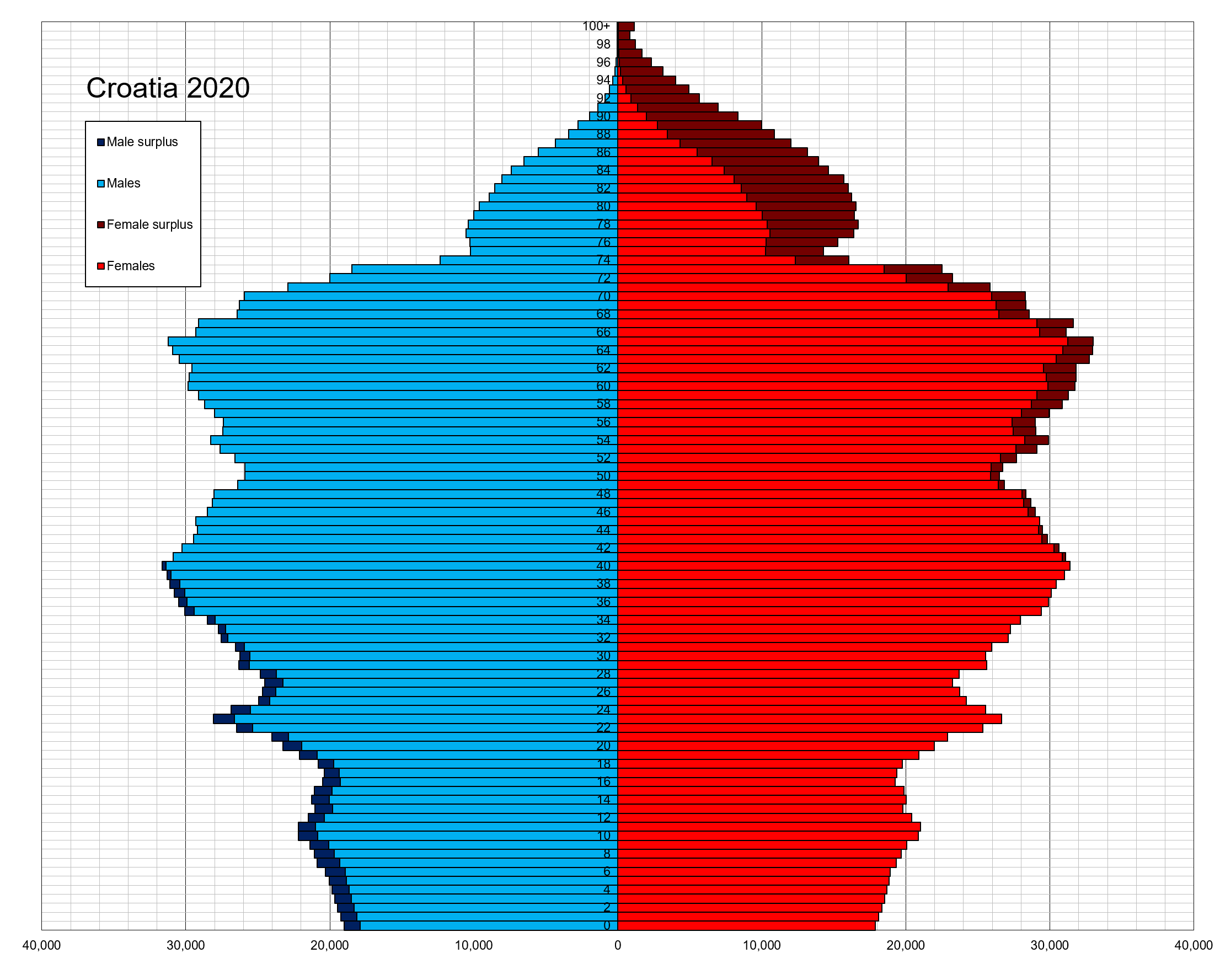
- Croatia population pyramid in 2020
- Population: ▲3,876,002 (31 December 2025)
- Growth rate: ▼0.4 per 1,000 pop. (2025)
- Birth rate: ▲8.4 per 1,000 pop. (2025)
- Death rate: ▼12.9 per 1,000 pop. (2025)
- Life expectancy: ▲79.3 years (2025)
  - male: ▲76.4 years (2025)
  - female: ▲82.3 years (2025)
- Fertility rate: ▲1.49 children born/woman (2025)
- Infant mortality: ▼3.1 deaths/1,000 infants (2025)
- Net migration rate: ▼4.9 migrant(s)/1,000 pop. (2025)
- Immigrant share: 13.6% (2024)

Age structure
- 0–14 years: ▼13.7% (2024)
- 15–64 years: ▼62.8% (2024)
- 65 and over: ▲23.5% (2024)

Sex ratio
- Total: 0.84 male(s)/female (2009 est.)
- At birth: 1.06 male(s)/female
- Under 15: 1.06 male(s)/female
- 15–64 years: 0.99 male(s)/female
- 65 and over: 0.64 male(s)/female

Nationality
- Nationality: noun: Croatian(s) adjective: Croatian
- Major ethnic: Croats (91.63%) (2021)
- Minor ethnic: Serbs (3.2%) (2021) and others <2% individually (2021)

Language
- Official: Croatian at national level; Italian, Czech, Hungarian, Ruthenian, Serbian and Slovak are in official use in some local government areas
- Spoken: Croatian, languages of the minorities

Historical population
Year	Pop.	±% p.a.
1857	2,181,499	—
1869	2,398,292	+0.79%
1880	2,506,228	+0.40%
1890	2,854,558	+1.31%
1900	3,161,456	+1.03%
1910	3,460,584	+0.91%
1921	3,443,375	−0.05%
1931	3,785,455	+0.95%
1948	3,779,858	−0.01%
1953	3,936,022	+0.81%
1961	4,159,696	+0.69%
1971	4,426,221	+0.62%
1981	4,601,469	+0.39%
1991	4,784,265	+0.39%
2001	4,437,460	−0.75%
2011	4,284,889	−0.35%
2021	3,871,833	−1.01%
2025	3,874,993	+0.02%
Source: Croatian Bureau of Statistics

The demographic characteristics of the population of Croatia are known through censuses, normally conducted in ten-year intervals and analysed by various statistical bureaus since the 1850s. The Croatian Bureau of Statistics has performed this task since the 1990s. The latest census in Croatia was performed in autumn of 2021. According to final results published on 22 September 2022 the permanent population of Croatia at the 2021 census (31st Aug) stood at 3.87 million. The population density is 68.7 inhabitants per square kilometre, and the overall life expectancy in Croatia at birth was 78,2 years in 2018. The population rose steadily (with the exception of censuses taken following the two world wars) from 2.1 million in 1857 until 1991, when it peaked at 4.7 million. Since 1991, Croatia's death rate has continuously exceeded its birth rate; the natural growth rate of the population is negative. This population drop is also caused by emigration rates. Because of this, Croatia's population fell below 4 million again in 2018, and the apex of its mass emigration occurred in 2022, while population didn't increase again until 2023 due to immigration compensating for the negative natural change. Croatia is in the fourth (or fifth) stage of the demographic transition. In terms of age structure, the population is dominated by the 15 to 64 year‑old segment. The median age of the population is 43.4, and the gender ratio of the total population is 0.93 males per 1 female.

Croatia is inhabited mostly by Croats (91.63%), while minorities include Serbs (3.2%), and 21 other ethnicities (less than 1% each). The demographic history of Croatia is marked by significant migrations, including the arrival of the Croats in the area growth of Hungarian and German-speaking population since the union of Croatia and Hungary, and joining of the Habsburg Empire, migrations set off by Ottoman conquests and growth of Italian speaking population in Istria and in Dalmatia during Venetian rule there. After the collapse of Austria-Hungary, the Hungarian population declined, while the German-speaking population was forced or compelled to leave after World War II and similar fate was suffered by the Italian population. Late 19th century and the 20th century were marked by large scale economic migrations abroad. The 1940s and the 1950s in Yugoslavia were marked by internal migrations in Yugoslavia, as well as by urbanisation. Recently, significant migrations came as a result of the Croatian War of Independence when hundreds of thousands were displaced, while the 2010s brought a new wave of emigration which strengthened after Croatia's accession to the EU in 2013.

Croatian is the official language, but minority languages are officially used in some local government units. Croatian is declared as the native language by 95.60% of the population. A 2009 survey revealed that 78% of Croatians claim knowledge of at least one foreign language—most often English. The main religions of Croatia are Roman Catholic (86.28%), Eastern Orthodoxy (4.44%) and Islam (1.47%). Literacy in Croatia stands at 98.1%. The proportion of the population aged 15 and over attaining academic degrees grew rapidly since 2001, doubling and reaching 16.7% by 2008. An estimated 4.5% of the GDP is spent for education. Primary and secondary education are available in Croatian and in languages of recognised minorities. Croatia has a universal health care system and in 2010, the nation spent 6.9% of its GDP on healthcare. Net monthly income in August 2023 averaged 1,163 euro. The most significant sources of employment in 2023 were manufacturing industry, wholesale and retail trade and construction. In August 2023, the unemployment rate was 6.9%. Croatia's median equivalent household income tops average Purchasing Power Standard of the ten countries which joined the EU in 2004, while trailing the EU average. 2011 census recorded a total of 1.5 million private households, which predominantly owned their own housing. The average urbanisation rate in Croatia stands at 56%, with an augmentation of the urban population and a reduction of the rural population.

== Population ==
2011 Croatian population density by county in persons per km^{2}.

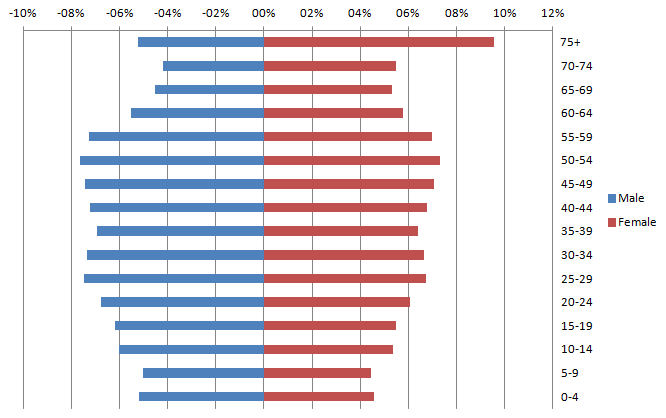
2009 Croatian population pyramid

With a population of 3,871,833 in 2021, Croatia ranks 128th in the world by population. Its population density is 75.8 inhabitants per square kilometre. The overall life expectancy in Croatia at birth is 78 years.

The total fertility rate of 1.50 children per mother is one of the lowest in the world. Since 1991, Croatia's death rate has nearly continuously exceeded its birth rate. The Croatian Bureau of Statistics forecast that the population may even shrink to 3.1 million by 2051, depending on the actual birth rate and the level of net migration. The population of Croatia rose steadily from 2.1 million in 1857 until 1991, when it peaked at 4.7 million, with the exception of censuses taken in 1921 and 1948, i.e. following two world wars. The natural growth rate of the population is negative. Croatia started advancing from the first stage of the demographic transition in the late 18th and early 19th centuries (depending on where in Croatia is being discussed). Croatia is in the fourth or fifth stage of the demographic transition.

An explanation for the population decrease in the 1990s is the Croatian War of Independence. During the war, large sections of the population were displaced and emigration increased. In 1991, in predominantly Serb areas, more than 400,000 Croats and other non-Serbs were either removed from their homes by the Croatian Serb forces or fled the violence. In 1995, during the final days of the war, more than 120,000 and perhaps as many as 200,000 Serbs fled the country before the arrival of Croatian forces during Operation Storm. Within a decade following the end of the war, only 117,000 Serb refugees returned out of the 300,000 displaced during the entire war. According to 2001 Croatian census there were 201,631 Serbs in Croatia, compared to the census from 1991 when the number was 581,663. Most of Croatia's remaining Serbs never lived in areas occupied in the Croatian War of Independence. Serbs have been only partially re-settled in the regions they previously inhabited, while some of the settlements previously inhabited by Serbs were settled by Croat refugees from Bosnia and Herzegovina, mostly from Republika Srpska.

In 2014, there were 39,566 live births in Croatia, comprising 20,374 male and 19,192 female children. Virtually all of those were performed in medical facilities; only 19 births occurred elsewhere. Out of the total number, 32,677 children were born in wedlock or within 300 days after the end of the marriage, and the average age of mothers at the birth of their first child was 28.4 years. General fertility rate, i.e. number of births per 1,000 women aged 15–49 is 42.9, with the age specific rate peaking at 101.0 per million for women aged 25–29. In 2009, 52,414 persons died in Croatia, 48.5% of whom died in medical facilities and 90.0% of whom were receiving medical treatment at the time. Cardiovascular disease and cancer were the primary causes of death in the country, with 26,235 and 13,280 deaths respectively. In the same year, there were 2,986 violent deaths, including 2,121 due to accidents. The latter figure includes 616 deaths in traffic accidents. In 2014, the birth rate was 9.3 per mille, exceeded by the mortality rate of 12.0 per mille. The infant mortality rate was 5.0 per mille in 2014. In terms of age structure, the population of Croatia is dominated by the 15–64 year older segment (68.1%), while the size of the population younger than 15 and older than 64 is relatively small (15.1% and 16.9% respectively). The median age of the population is 41.4. The sex ratio of the population is 1.06 males per 1 female at birth and up to 14 years of age, and 0.99 males per 1 female between the ages of 15 and 64. But at ages over 64 the ratio is 0.64 males per 1 female. The ratio for the total population is 0.93 males per 1 female.

In contrast to the shrinking native population, since the late 1990s there has been a positive net migration into Croatia, reaching a level of more than 7,000 net immigrants in 2006. In accordance with its immigration policy, Croatia is also trying to entice emigrants to return. Croatian citizenship is acquired in a multitude of ways, based on origin, place of birth, naturalization and international treaties. In recent years, the Croatian government has been pressured each year to add 40% to work permit quotas for foreign workers.

There were 8,468 immigrants to Croatia in 2009, more than half of them (57.5%) coming from Bosnia and Herzegovina, a sharp decline from the previous year's 14,541. In the same year, there were 9,940 emigrants from the country, 44.8% of them leaving to Serbia. The number of emigrants represents a substantial increase compared to the figure of 7,488 recorded in 2008. In 2009, the net migration to and from abroad peaked in the Sisak-Moslavina County (−1,093 persons) and the city of Zagreb (+830 persons).

In 2009, a total of 22,382 marriages were performed in Croatia as well as 5,076 divorces. The 2001 census recorded 1.47 million households in the country.

View source data.
View source data.
View source data.
View source data.

=== Census data ===
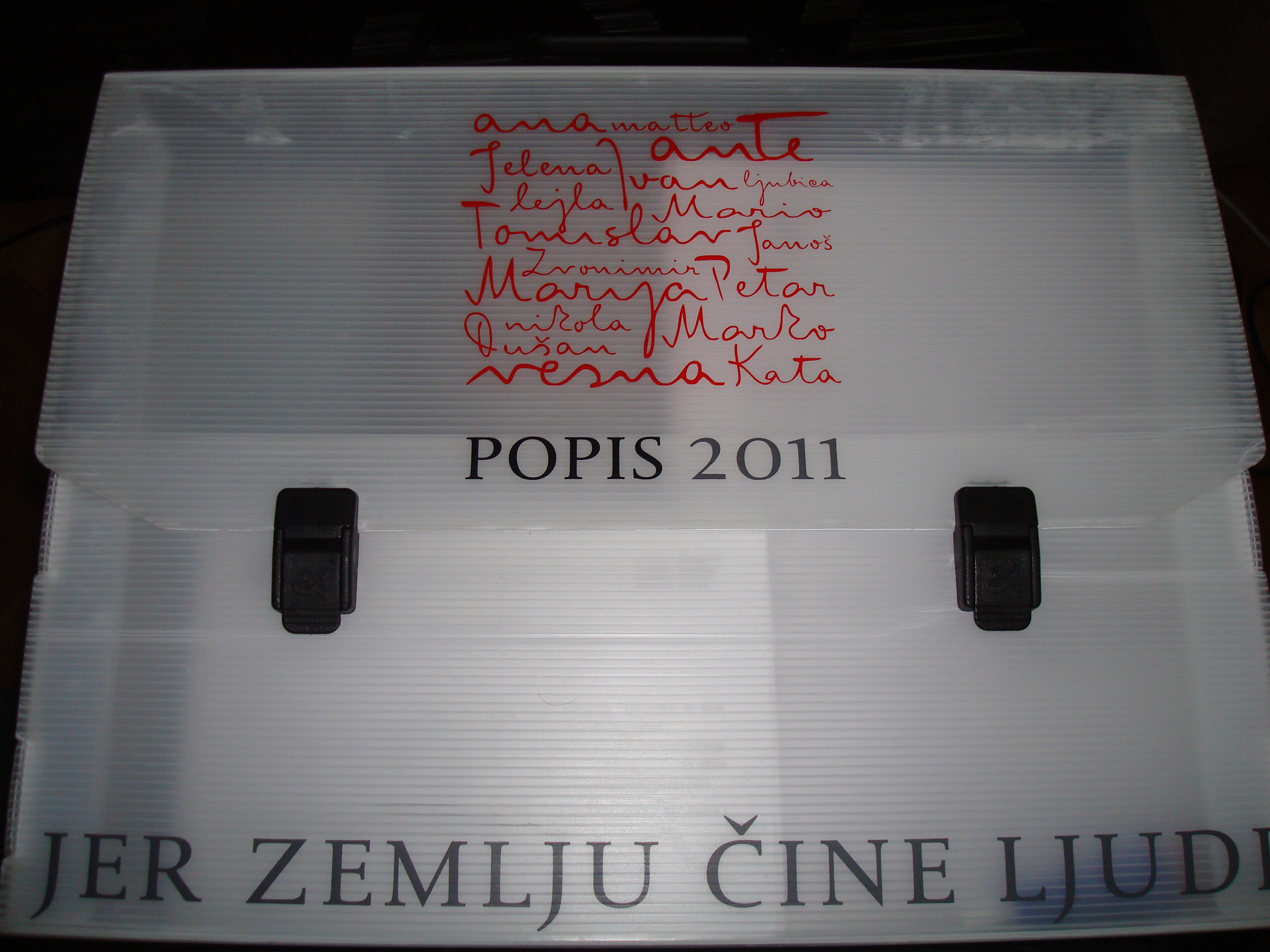
An official briefcase used by the Croatian Bureau of Statistics census takers for the purposes of the 2011 census

The first modern population census in the country was conducted in 1857, and 15 more have been performed since then. Since 1961 the censuses are conducted in regular ten-year intervals, with the latest one in 2011. The first institution set up in the country specifically for the purposes of maintaining population statistics was the State Statistical Office, founded in 1875. Since its founding, the office changed its name and structure several times and was alternately subordinated to other institutions and independent, until the most recent changes in 1992, when the institution became the Croatian Bureau of Statistics. The 2011 census was performed on 1–28 April 2011, recording situation as of 31 March 2011. The first census results, containing the number of the population by settlement, were published on 29 June 2011, and the final comprehensive set of data was published in December 2012. The 2011 census and processing of the data gathered by the census was expected to cost 171.9 million kuna (23.3 million euro). The 2011 census was performed using new methodology: the permanent population was determined as the enumerated population who lived in the census area for at least 12 months prior to the census, or plans to live in the same area for at least 12 months after the census. This method was also retroactively applied to the 2001 census data.

Year	Enumerated population	Permanent population	Average annual growth rate	Population density per km^{2}
1857	2,181,499	—N/a	–	38.5
1869	2,398,292	—N/a	0.83%	42.4
1880	2,506,228	—N/a	0.41%	44.3
1890	2,854,558	—N/a	1.39%	50.4
1900	3,161,456	—N/a	1.08%	55.9
1910	3,460,584	—N/a	0.95%	61.1
1921	3,443,375	—N/a	−0.05%	60.8
1931	3,785,455	—N/a	0.99%	66.9
1948	3,779,858	—N/a	−0.01%	66.8
1953	3,936,022	—N/a	0.83%	69.5
1961	4,159,696	—N/a	0.71%	73.5
1971	4,426,221	—N/a	0.64%	78.2
1981	4,601,469	—N/a	0.40%	81.3
1991	4,784,265	—N/a	0.40%	84.5
2001	4,492,049	4,437,460	−0.72%	78.4
2011	4,456,096	4,284,889	−0.34%	75.7
2021	3,937,024	3,871,833	−0.96%	68.4
Source: Croatian Bureau of Statistics; Note: From 2001 population density is calculated using the permanent population figure.

=== Total Fertility Rate from 1880 to 1899 ===
The total fertility rate is the number of children born per woman. It is based on fairly good data for the entire period. Sources: Our World in Data and Gapminder Foundation.

Years	1880	1881	1882	1883	1884	1885	1886	1887	1888	1889	1890
Total Fertility Rate in Croatia	5.75	5.75	5.86	5.96	6.07	6.18	6	5.83	5.65	5.48	5.31

Years	1891	1892	1893	1894	1895	1896	1897	1898	1899
Total Fertility Rate in Croatia	5.42	5.53	5.64	5.76	5.83	5.79	5.7	5.7	5.54

=== Total Fertility Rate from 1915 to 1940 ===
Years	1915	1916	1917	1918	1919	1920
Total Fertility Rate in Croatia	5	5.09	5.19	5.28	5.37	5.31

Years	1921	1922	1923	1924	1925	1926	1927	1928	1929	1930
Total Fertility Rate in Croatia	5.26	5.2	5.14	5.08	4.98	4.87	4.77	4.67	4.57	4.47

Years	1931	1932	1933	1934	1935	1936	1937	1938	1939	1940
Total Fertility Rate in Croatia	4.36	4.26	4.16	4.06	3.96	3.85	3.75	3.65	3.55	3.45

== Vital statistics ==
=== Births and deaths before WWI ===
	Average population	Live births	Deaths	Natural change	Crude birth rate (per 1000)	Crude death rate (per 1000)	Natural change (per 1000)	Total fertility rates
1900	2,375,000	97,000	65,000	32,000	40.7	27.5	13.2	5.45
1901	2,432,000	95,000	67,000	28,000	39.2	27.4	11.8	5.41
1902	2,431,000	101,000	67,000	34,000	41.5	27.6	13.9	5.38
1903	2,462,000	97,000	66,000	31,000	39.3	26.9	12.4	5.34
1904	2,477,000	99,000	65,000	34,000	40.0	26.2	13.8	5.30
1905	2,493,000	100,000	75,000	25,000	40.1	30.1	10.0	5.26
1906	2,515,000	100,000	66,000	34,000	39.7	26.3	13.4	5.22
1907	2,550,000	100,000	65,000	35,000	39.3	25.4	13.9	5.18
1908	2,560,000	100,000	70,000	30,000	39.2	27.2	12.0	5.14
1909	2,588,000	108,000	69,000	39,000	41.7	26.7	15.0	5.10
1910	2,616,000	99,000	65,000	34,000	37.9	24.8	13.1	5.06
1911	2,628,000	95,000	69,000	26,000	36.0	26.4	9.6	5.02
1912	2,654,000	101,000	67,000	34,000	38.1	25.2	12.9	4.98
1913	2,663,000	95,000	68,000	27,000	35.7	25.5	10.2	4.94
1914	2,675,000	98,000	66,000	32,000	36.6	24.7	11.9	4.90
Source: Brian R. Mitchell, European historical statistics, 1750–1975

=== Births and deaths after WWII ===
Source: Croatian Bureau of Statistics

	Average population	Live births	Deaths	Natural change	Crude birth rate (per 1000)	Crude death rate (per 1000)	Natural change (per 1000)	Crude migration rate (per 1000)	Total fertility rate	Female fertile population (15–49 years)
1950	3,850,991	95,174	47,292	47,882	24.7	12.3	12.4		2.94	1,091,313
1951	3,881,986	87,181	49,804	37,377	22.5	12.8	9.6	−1.6	2.66	1,091,156
1952	3,912,983	91,225	43,512	47,713	23.3	11.1	12.2	−4.3	2.77	1,090,994
1953	3,945,997	90,200	46,662	43,538	22.9	11.8	11.0	−2.7	2.68	1,090,834
1954	3,978,125	89,309	41,071	48,238	22.5	10.3	12.1	−4.0	2.61	1,097,788
1955	4,013,015	88,657	42,035	46,622	22.1	10.5	11.6	−2.9	2.56	1,104,740
1956	4,039,992	86,171	43,772	42,399	21.3	10.8	10.5	−3.8	2.47	1,111,693
1957	4,067,005	81,414	40,261	41,153	20.0	9.9	10.1	−3.5	2.30	1,113,448
1958	4,088,987	77,771	37,980	39,791	19.0	9.3	9.7	−4.4	2.19	1,115,826
1959	4,114,979	78,233	40,688	37,545	19.0	9.9	9.1	−2.8	2.24	1,093,146
1960	4,140,181	76,156	41,361	34,795	18.4	10.0	8.4	−2.3	2.23	1,079,109
1961	4,167,292	74,190	37,796	36,394	17.8	9.1	8.7	−2.2	2.23	1,065,072
1962	4,196,712	72,267	42,134	30,133	17.2	10.0	7.2	−0.2	2.11	1,083,743
1963	4,225,675	69,878	38,597	31,281	16.5	9.1	7.4	−0.5	2.05	1,088,767
1964	4,252,876	68,873	43,013	25,860	16.2	10.1	6.1	0.3	2.04	1,095,023
1965	4,280,923	71,186	39,936	31,250	16.6	9.3	7.3	−0.7	2.19	1,096,232
1966	4,310,701	71,325	37,941	33,384	16.5	8.8	7.7	−0.8	2.20	1,113,169
1967	4,338,683	67,103	41,381	25,722	15.5	9.5	6.0	0.5	2.06	1,138,279
1968	4,365,628	65,431	43,720	21,711	15.0	10.0	5.0	1.2	1.99	1,141,548
1969	4,391,490	63,635	46,844	16,791	14.5	10.7	3.8	2.1	1.91	1,170,146
1970	4,412,252	61,103	44,148	16,955	13.8	10.0	3.8	0.9	1.81	1,173,533
1971	4,431,275	64,890	44,878	20,012	14.6	10.1	4.5	−0.2	1.97	1,174,488
1972	4,450,564	66,035	47,881	18,154	14.8	10.8	4.1	0.3	1.96	1,176,673
1973	4,470,161	67,389	45,680	21,709	15.1	10.2	4.9	−0.5	1.97	1,170,468
1974	4,490,660	67,251	44,950	22,301	15.0	10.0	5.0	−0.4	1.93	1,164,291
1975	4,512,082	67,016	45,640	21,376	14.9	10.1	4.7	0	1.90	1,177,334
1976	4,535,934	67,054	45,074	21,980	14.8	9.9	4.8	0.4	1.88	1,177,247
1977	4,559,571	68,035	45,156	22,879	14.9	9.9	5.0	0.2	1.90	1,165,123
1978	4,581,085	68,704	48,715	19,989	15.0	10.6	4.4	0.3	1.92	1,170,862
1979	4,594,778	69,229	48,426	20,803	15.1	10.5	4.5	−1.5	1.95	1,166,817
1980	4,599,782	68,220	50,100	18,120	14.8	10.9	3.9	−2.9	1.92	1,162,773
1981	4,611,509	67,455	51,420	16,035	14.6	11.2	3.5	−0.9	1.93	1,152,704
1982	4,634,234	66,737	50,770	15,967	14.4	11.0	3.4	1.5	1.90	1,130,858
1983	4,658,254	65,599	55,147	10,452	14.1	11.8	2.2	2.9	1.88	1,139,362
1984	4,680,285	64,888	54,169	10,719	13.9	11.6	2.3	2.4	1.87	1,131,152
1985	4,701,417	62,665	52,067	10,598	13.3	11.1	2.3	2.2	1.82	1,117,142
1986	4,721,446	60,226	51,740	8,486	12.8	11.0	1.8	2.4	1.76	1,161,753
1987	4,739,745	59,209	53,080	6,129	12.5	11.2	1.3	2.6	1.74	1,102,815
1988	4,755,207	58,525	52,686	5,839	12.3	11.1	1.2	2.0	1.74	1,125,627
1989	4,767,260	55,651	52,569	3,082	11.7	11.0	0.6	1.9	1.67	1,169,437
1990	4,777,368	55,409	52,192	3,217	11.6	10.9	0.7	1.4	1.68	1,134,934
1991	4,733,938	51,829	54,832	−3,003	10.9	11.6	−0.6	−8.5	1.59	1,125,917
1992	4,690,509	46,970	51,800	−4,830	10.0	11.0	−1.0	−9.2	1.46	1,116,900
1993	4,647,079	48,535	50,846	−2,311	10.4	10.9	−0.5	−8.8	1.52	1,107,883
1994	4,603,649	48,584	49,482	−898	10.6	10.7	−0.2	−9.2	1.54	1,098,867
1995	4,560,220	50,182	50,536	−354	11.0	11.1	−0.1	−9.4	1.62	1,089,849
1996	4,516,790	53,811	50,636	3,175	11.9	11.2	0.7	−10.3	1.76	1,080,833
1997	4,473,361	55,501	51,964	3,537	12.4	11.6	0.8	−10.5	1.84	1,071,815
1998	4,429,931	47,068	52,311	−5,243	10.6	11.8	−1.2	−8.6	1.59	1,062,799
1999	4,386,501	45,179	51,953	−6,774	10.3	11.8	−1.5	−8.4	1.55	1,053,782
2000	4,343,072	43,746	50,246	−6,500	10.1	11.6	−1.5	−8.5	1.52	1,044,765
2001	4,299,642	40,993	49,552	−8,559	9.5	11.5	−2.0	−8.1	1.45	1,035,748
2002	4,302,174	40,094	50,569	−10,475	9.3	11.8	−2.4	3.0	1.43	1,033,822
2003	4,303,399	39,668	52,575	−12,907	9.2	12.2	−3.0	3.3	1.41	1,029,271
2004	4,304,600	40,307	49,756	−9,449	9.4	11.6	−2.2	2.5	1.43	1,025,538
2005	4,310,145	42,492	51,790	−9,298	9.9	12.0	−2.2	3.4	1.50	1,019,358
2006	4,311,159	41,446	50,378	−8,932	9.6	11.7	−2.1	2.3	1.47	1,012,512
2007	4,310,217	41,910	52,367	−10,457	9.7	12.1	−2.4	2.2	1.49	1,005,073
2008	4,309,705	43,753	52,151	−8,398	10.2	12.1	−1.9	1.8	1.56	998,329
2009	4,305,181	44,577	52,414	−7,837	10.4	12.2	−1.8	0.8	1.59	989,751
2010	4,295,427	43,361	52,096	−8,735	10.1	12.1	−2.0	−0.2	1.55	979,563
2011	4,280,622	41,197	51,019	−9,822	9.6	11.9	−2.3	−1.2	1.48	970,458
2012	4,260,368	41,771	51,710	−9,939	9.8	12.1	−2.3	−2.4	1.52	960,549
2013	4,233,922	39,939	50,386	−10,447	9.4	11.9	−2.5	−3.8	1.47	949,241
2014	4,201,598	39,566	50,839	−11,273	9.4	12.1	−2.7	−5	1.48	936,294
2015	4,151,725	37,503	54,205	−16,702	9.0	13.1	−4.0	−7.9	1.43	917,853
2016	4,106,867	37,537	51,542	−14,005	9.1	12.6	−3.4	−7.4	1.46	898,385
2017	4,041,407	36,556	53,477	−16,921	9.0	13.2	−4.1	−11.8	1.47	872,669
2018	3,988,775	36,945	52,706	−15,761	9.3	13.2	−3.9	−9.1	1.53	850,224
2019	3,949,390	36,135	51,794	−15,659	9.1	13.1	−3.9	−5.7	1.54	830,836
2020	3,914,206	35,845	57,023	−21,178	9.2	14.6	−5.4	−3.5	1.57	815,720
2021	3,878,981	36,508	62,712	−26,204	9.4	16.2	−6.7	−2.3	1.62	804,303
2022	3,855,641	33,883	56,979	−23,096	8.8	14.8	−6.0	−0.1	1.53	794,595
2023	3,859,686	32,170	51,275	−19,105	8.3	13.3	−5.0	6	1.46	792,162
2024	3,866,233	32,069	51,080	−19,011	8.3	13.2	−4.9	6.6	1.46	789,060
2025	3,874,993	32,479	50,007	−17,528	8.4	12.9	−4.5	4.9	1.49	789,040

=== Current vital statistics ===
Period	Live births	Deaths	Natural increase
January–September 2025	24,072	38,160	–14,088
January–September 2026	25,064	37,773	–12,709
Difference	▲ +992 (+4.12%)	▼ –387 (–1.01%)	▲ +1,379

View source data.

=== Vital statistics by county ===
	Population	Live births	Deaths	Natural change	Crude birth rate (per 1000)	Crude death rate (per 1000)	Natural change (per 1000)
Zagreb	312,678	2,797	3,558	−761	8.9	11.4	−2.4
Krapina-Zagorje	118,726	895	1,600	−705	7.5	13.5	−5.9
Sisak-Moslavina	132,371	1,073	2,152	−1,079	8.1	16.3	−8.2
Karlovac	108,539	815	1,740	−925	7.5	16.0	−8.5
Varaždin	158,080	1,213	2,072	−859	7.7	13.1	−5.4
Koprivnica-Križevci	98,412	860	1,452	−592	8.7	14.8	−6.0
Bjelovar-Bilogora	97,492	832	1,532	−700	8.5	15.7	−7.2
Primorje-Gorski Kotar	266,480	1,760	3,701	−1,941	6.6	13.9	−7.3
Lika-Senj	43,591	342	727	−385	7.8	16.7	−8.8
Virovitica-Podravina	66,594	549	1,011	−462	8.2	15.2	−6.9
Požega-Slavonia	60,091	525	911	−386	8.7	15.2	−6.4
Brod-Posavina	124,900	1,059	1,932	−873	8.5	15.5	−7.0
Zadar	167,501	1,502	2,114	−612	9.0	12.6	−3.7
Osijek-Baranja	248,607	2,011	3,524	−1,513	8.1	14.2	−6.1
Šibenik-Knin	96,477	747	1,427	−680	7.7	14.8	−7.0
Vukovar-Srijem	135,748	1,177	2,157	−980	8.7	15.9	−7.2
Split-Dalmatia	432,478	3,790	4,793	−1,003	8.8	11.1	−2.3
Istria	206,934	1,433	2,483	−1,050	6.9	12.0	−5.1
Dubrovnik-Neretva	117,270	1,050	1,278	−228	9.0	10.9	−1.9
Međimurje	104,849	1,013	1,235	−222	9.7	11.8	−2.1
City of Zagreb	778,184	7,036	8,608	−1,572	9.0	11.1	−2.0
Note: data shown in the table are for 2025

=== Total fertility rates by counties ===
2024
Counties	TFR
Bjelovar-Bilogora	1.81
Brod-Posavina	1.72
Koprivnica-Križevci	1.69
Požega-Slavonia	1.69
Vukovar-Srijem	1.67
Zadar	1.62
Međimurje	1.60
Šibenik-Knin	1.58
Dubrovnik-Neretva	1.55
Lika-Senj	1.55
Sisak-Moslavina	1.54
Zagreb	1.52
Virovitica-Podravina	1.51
Osijek-Baranja	1.50
Split-Dalmatia	1.48
Karlovac	1.42
Krapina-Zagorje	1.35
Varaždin	1.35
City of Zagreb	1.33
Istria	1.25
Primorje-Gorski Kotar	1.20

=== Structure of the population ===
View source data.
Population by Sex and Age Group (Census 01.IV.2011):

Age Group	Male	Female	Total	%
Total	2 066 335	2 218 554	4 284 889	100
0–4	109 251	103 458	212 709	4.96
5–9	104 841	99 476	204 317	4.77
10–14	120 633	114 769	235 402	5.49
15–19	124 918	119 259	244 177	5.70
20–24	133 455	128 203	261 658	6.11
25–29	147 416	141 650	289 066	6.75
30–34	149 998	144 621	294 619	6.88
35–39	143 984	140 770	284 754	6.65
40–44	143 603	143 330	286 933	6.70
45–49	152 446	155 115	307 561	7.18
50–54	157 981	162 521	320 502	7.48
55–59	153 750	158 068	311 818	7.28
60–64	127 851	144 889	272 740	6.37
65–69	89 364	112 638	202 002	4.71
70–74	88 912	123 489	212 401	4.96
75–79	66 456	109 070	175 526	4.10
80–84	35 999	72 105	108 104	2.52
85–89	12 415	35 226	47 641	1.11
90–94	2 580	8 178	10 758	0.25
95–99	446	1 557	2 003	0.05
100+	36	162	198	<0.01
Age group	Male	Female	Total	Percent
0–14	334 725	317 703	652 428	15.23
15–64	1 435 402	1 438 426	2 873 828	67.07
65+	296 208	462 425	758 633	17.70

Population Estimates by Sex and Age Group (01.I.2021):

Age Group	Male	Female	Total	%
Total	1 964 930	2 071 425	4 036 355	100
0–4	93 094	88 456	181 550	4.50
5–9	98 610	92 382	190 992	4.73
10–14	103 861	98 484	202 345	5.01
15–19	100 760	95 080	195 840	4.85
20–24	121 362	111 639	233 001	5.77
25–29	124 266	113 882	238 148	5.90
30–34	129 589	120 925	250 514	6.21
35–39	142 764	134 641	277 405	6.87
40–44	143 900	136 684	280 584	6.95
45–49	137 002	132 354	269 356	6.67
50–54	135 156	136 496	271 652	6.73
55–59	139 894	147 579	287 473	7.12
60–64	139 203	153 445	292 648	7.25
65–69	126 789	144 282	271 071	6.72
70–74	94 333	124 596	218 929	5.42
75–79	59 495	91 040	150 535	3.73
80–84	46 485	82 214	128 699	3.19
85–89	21 993	48 425	70 418	1.74
90–94	5 737	15 973	21 710	0.54
95–99	619	2 734	3 353	0.08
100+	18	114	132	<0.01
Age group	Male	Female	Total	Percent
0–14	295 565	279 322	574 887	14.24
15–64	1 313 896	1 282 725	2 596 621	64.33
65+	355 469	509 378	864 847	21.43

== Marriages and divorces ==
	Average population	Marriages	Divorces	Crude marriage rate (per 1000)	Crude divorce rate (per 1000)	Divorces per 1000 marriages
1950	3,850,991	38,163	3,137	9.9	0.8	82.2
1951	3,881,986	35,079	2,947	9.0	0.8	84.0
1952	3,912,983	39,492	3,175	10.1	0.8	80.4
1953	3,945,997	37,022	3,924	9.4	1.0	106.0
1954	3,978,125	40,715	3,854	10.2	1.0	94.7
1955	4,013,015	39,219	4,499	9.8	1.1	114.7
1956	4,039,992	38,677	4,419	9.6	1.1	114.3
1957	4,067,005	36,627	4,746	9.0	1.2	129.6
1958	4,088,987	37,359	5,272	9.1	1.3	141.1
1959	4,114,979	36,651	5,053	8.9	1.2	137.9
1960	4,140,181	36,761	4,811	8.9	1.2	130.9
1961	4,167,292	36,634	5,057	8.8	1.2	138.0
1962	4,196,712	36,149	4,883	8.6	1.2	135.1
1963	4,225,675	33,976	5,114	8.0	1.2	150.5
1964	4,252,876	35,965	5,217	8.5	1.2	145.1
1965	4,280,923	38,474	5,663	9.0	1.3	147.2
1966	4,310,701	36,896	5,390	8.6	1.3	146.1
1967	4,338,683	35,815	4,861	8.3	1.1	135.7
1968	4,365,628	35,447	4,891	8.1	1.1	138.0
1969	4,391,490	35,466	5,474	8.1	1.2	154.3
1970	4,412,252	37,319	5,333	8.5	1.2	142.9
1971	4,431,275	37,701	5,427	8.5	1.2	143.9
1972	4,450,564	37,779	5,567	8.5	1.3	147.4
1973	4,470,161	36,967	5,781	8.3	1.3	156.4
1974	4,490,660	36,034	6,331	8.0	1.4	175.7
1975	4,512,082	36,290	5,928	8.0	1.3	163.4
1976	4,535,934	35,019	6,099	7.7	1.3	174.2
1977	4,559,571	35,524	5,511	7.8	1.2	155.1
1978	4,581,085	35,629	5,959	7.8	1.3	167.3
1979	4,594,778	34,041	5,036	7.4	1.1	147.9
1980	4,599,782	33,310	5,342	7.2	1.2	160.4
1981	4,611,509	33,855	5,704	7.3	1.2	168.5
1982	4,634,234	33,143	5,355	7.2	1.2	161.6
1983	4,658,254	33,135	5,263	7.1	1.1	158.8
1984	4,680,285	32,161	5,295	6.9	1.1	164.6
1985	4,701,417	30,953	5,375	6.6	1.1	173.7
1986	4,721,446	30,495	5,946	6.5	1.3	195.0
1987	4,739,745	31,395	5,577	6.6	1.2	177.6
1988	4,755,207	29,719	5,647	6.2	1.2	190.0
1989	4,767,260	28,938	5,369	6.1	1.1	185.5
1990	4,777,368	27,924	5,466	5.8	1.1	195.7
1991	4,733,938	21,583	4,877	4.6	1.0	226.0
1992	4,690,509	22,169	3,676	4.7	0.8	165.8
1993	4,647,079	23,021	4,667	5.0	1.0	202.7
1994	4,603,649	23,966	4,630	5.2	1.0	193.2
1995	4,560,220	24,385	4,236	5.3	0.9	173.7
1996	4,516,790	24,596	3,612	5.4	0.8	146.9
1997	4,473,361	24,517	3,899	5.5	0.9	159.0
1998	4,429,931	24,243	3,962	5.5	0.9	163.4
1999	4,386,501	23,778	3,721	5.4	0.8	156.5
2000	4,343,072	22,017	4,419	5.1	1.0	200.7
2001	4,299,642	22,076	4,670	5.1	1.1	211.5
2002	4,302,174	22,806	4,496	5.3	1.0	197.1
2003	4,303,399	22,337	4,934	5.2	1.1	220.9
2004	4,304,600	22,700	4,985	5.3	1.2	219.6
2005	4,310,145	22,138	4,883	5.1	1.1	220.6
2006	4,311,159	22,092	4,651	5.1	1.1	210.5
2007	4,310,217	23,140	4,785	5.4	1.1	206.8
2008	4,309,705	23,373	5,025	5.4	1.2	215.0
2009	4,305,181	22,382	5,076	5.2	1.2	226.8
2010	4,295,427	21,294	5,058	5.0	1.2	237.5
2011	4,280,622	20,211	5,662	4.7	1.3	280.1
2012	4,260,368	20,323	5,659	4.8	1.3	278.5
2013	4,233,922	19,169	5,992	4.5	1.4	312.6
2014	4,201,598	19,501	6,570	4.6	1.6	336.9
2015	4,151,725	19,834	6,010	4.7	1.4	303.0
2016	4,106,867	20,467	7,036	4.9	1.7	343.8
2017	4,041,407	20,310	6,265	4.9	1.5	308.5
2018	3,988,775	19,921	6,125	4.9	1.5	307.5
2019	3,949,390	19,761	5,936	5.0	1.5	300.4
2020	3,914,206	15,196	5,153	3.9	1.3	339.1
2021	3,878,981	18,203	5,100	4.7	1.3	280.2
2022	3,855,641	18,074	4,808	4.7	1.3	266.0
2023	3,859,686	17,306	4,407	4.5	1.1	254.7
2024	3,866,233	17,206	4,961	4.5	1.3	288.3
2025	3,875,000	17,270	5,674	4.5	1.5	328.5

== Ethnic groups ==
Ethnic structure of Croatia in 2021.

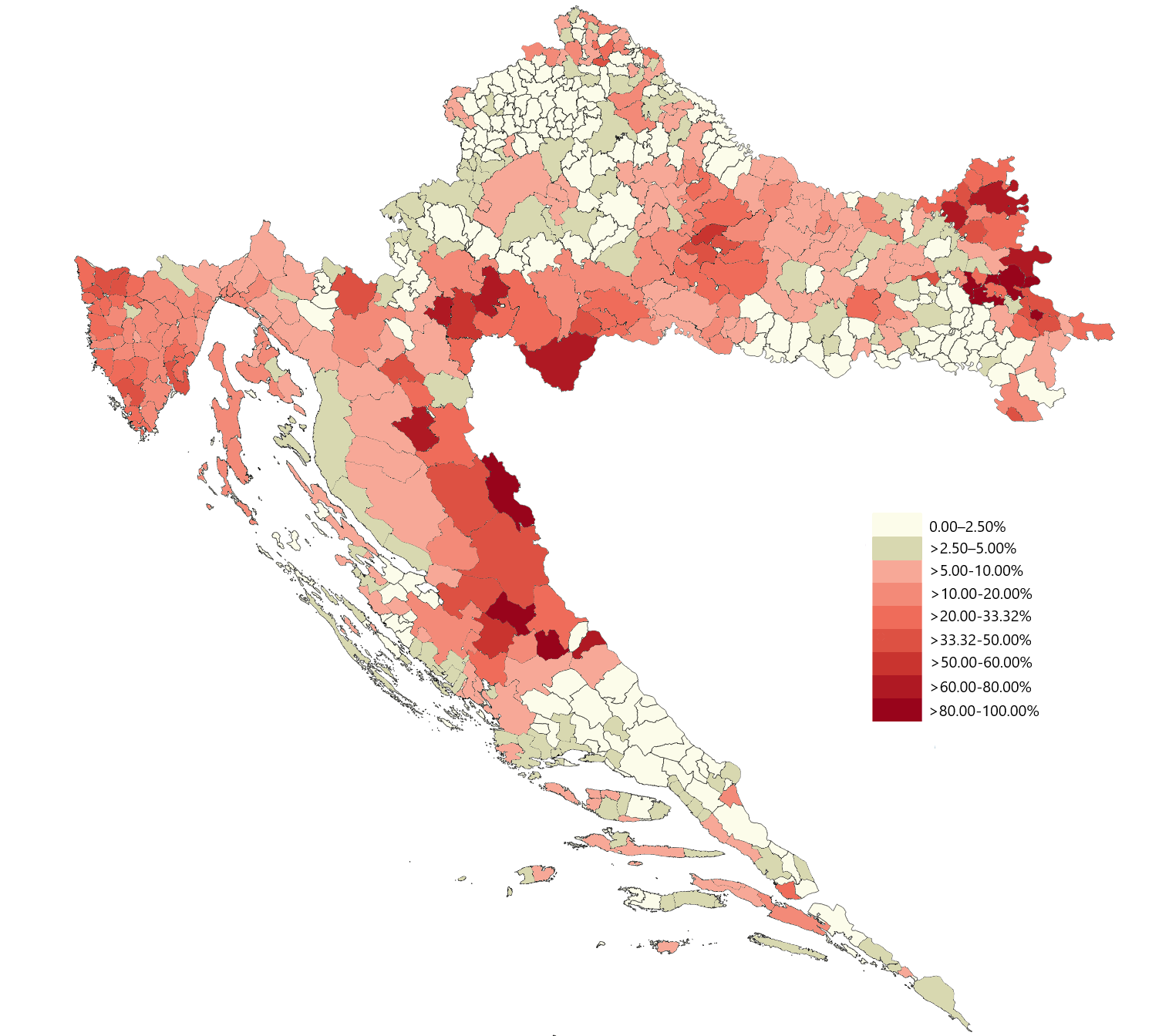
Municipalities and cities in Croatia per percentage of residents declaring ethnicity other than Croat in 2021 census (including undeclared and unknown).

Ethnic map of Croatia by municipalities (2021)

Croatia is inhabited mostly by Croats (91.63%), while minority groups include: Serbs (3.2%), Bosniaks, Hungarians, Italians, Albanians, Slovenes, Germans, Czechs, Roma and others (less than 1% each). The Constitution of the Republic of Croatia explicitly identifies 22 minorities. Those are Serbs, Czechs, Slovaks, Italians, Istro-Romanians ("Vlachs"), Hungarians, Jews, Germans, Austrians, Ukrainians, Romanians, Ruthenians, Macedonians, Bosniaks, Slovenes, Montenegrins, Russians, Bulgarians, Poles, Roma, Turks and Albanians.

=== 1900–1931 ===
Population of the present territory of Croatia according to ethnic group 1900–1931
Ethnic group	census 1900		census 1910		census 1921		census 1931	
Ethnic group	Number	%	Number	%	Number	%	Number	%
Croats	2,159,888	68.3	2,371,634	68.5	2,374,752	68.9	2,641,144	69.8
Serbs	548,302	17.3	575,922	16.6	584,058	16.9	636,518	16.8
Italians	140,365	4.4	155,749	4.5	210,336	6.1	230,000	6.1
Germans	115,948	3.7	119,587	3.5	99,808	2.9	99,670	2.6
Hungarians	101,617	3.2	121,408	3.5	81,835	2.4	69,671	1.8
Slovenes	28,485	0.9	28,179	0.8	32,023	0.9	37,143	1.0
Czechs	31,484	1.0	31,479	–	42,444	1.2	37,366	–
Slovaks	7,660	0.2	9,807	–	–	–	7,172	–
Ruthenians / Ukrainians (see Pannonian Rusyns)	2,075	0.1	5,596	–	3,883	0.1	4,242	–
Others	24,582	0.9	40,840	2.6	18,455	0.6	18,964	1.8
Total	3,160,406		3,460,201		3,447,594		3,785,455	

=== 1948–2021 ===
Population of Croatia according to ethnic group 1948–2021^{1}
Ethnic group	census 1948		census 1953		census 1961		census 1971		census 1981		census 1991		census 2001		census 2011		census 2021	
Ethnic group	Number	%	Number	%	Number	%	Number	%	Number	%	Number	%	Number	%	Number	%	Number	%
Croats	2,975,399	79.2	3,117,513	79.6	3,339,841	80.3	3,513,647	79.4	3,454,661	75.1	3,736,356	78.1	3,977,171	89.6	3,874,321	90.4	3,547,614	91.6
Serbs	543,795	14.5	588,411	15.0	624,985	15.0	626,789	14.2	531,502	11.6	581,663	12.2	201,631	4.5	186,633	4.4	123,892	3.2
Bosniaks	1,077	0.0	16,185	0.4	3,113	0.1	18,457	0.4	23,740	0.5	43,459	0.9	20,755	0.5	31,479	0.7	24,131	0.6
Muslims	1,077	0.0	16,185	0.4	3,113	0.1	18,457	0.4	23,740	0.5	43,459	0.9	19,677	0.4	7,558	0.2	3,902	0.1
Italians	76,093	2.0	33,316	0.9	21,103	0.5	17,433	0.4	11,661	0.3	21,303	0.4	19,636	0.4	17,807	0.4	13,763	0.4
Albanians	635	0.0	1,001	0.0	2,126	0.1	4,175	0.1	6,006	0.1	12,032	0.3	15,082	0.3	17,513	0.4	13,817	0.4
Roma	405	0.0	1,261	0.0	313	0.0	1,257	0.0	3,858	0.1	6,695	0.1	9,463	0.2	16,975	0.4	17,980	0.5
Hungarians	51,399	1.4	47,711	1.2	42,347	1.0	35,488	0.8	25,439	0.6	22,355	0.5	16,595	0.4	14,048	0.3	10,315	0.3
Slovenes	38,734	1.0	43,010	1.1	39,101	0.9	32,497	0.7	25,136	0.5	22,376	0.5	13,173	0.3	10,517	0.3	7,729	0.2
Czechs	28,991	0.8	25,954	0.7	23,391	0.6	19,001	0.4	15,061	0.3	13,086	0.3	10,510	0.2	9,641	0.2	7,862	0.2
Montenegrins	2,871	0.1	5,128	0.1	7,465	0.2	9,706	0.2	9,818	0.2	9,724	0.2	4,926	0.1	4,517	0.1	3,127	0.1
Macedonians	1,387	0.0	2,385	0.1	4,381	0.1	5,625	0.1	5,362	0.1	6,280	0.1	4,270	0.1	4,138	0.1	3,555	0.1
Yugoslavs					15,559	0.4	84,118	1.9	379,057	8.2	106,041	2.2	176	0.0	331	0.0	942	0.0
Others/undeclared	36,021	1.0	36,942	0.9	35,971	0.9	58,028	1.3	110,168	2.4	246,354	5.1	124,395^{2}	2.8	84,991^{3}	2.0	93,204^{4}	2.4
Total	3,756,807		3,918,817		4,159,696		4,426,221		4,601,469		4,784,265		4,437,460		4,284,889		3,871,833	
^{1} Source: Croatian Bureau of Statistics^{2} including Austrians 247 0.01%, Bulgarians 331 0.01%, Germans 2,902 0.07%, Jews 576 0.01%, Poles 567 0.01%, Romanians 475 0.01%, Russians 906 0.02%, Ruthenians 2,337 0.05, Slovaks 4,712 0.11% Turks 300 0.01%, Ukrainians 1,977 0.04%, Koreans 211 0.01%, Istro-Romanians 12 0.00%^{3} including Austrians 297 0.01%, Bulgarians 350 0.01%, Germans 2,965 0.07%, Jews 509 0.01%, Poles 672 0.02%, Romanians 435 0.01%, Russians 1,279 0.03%, Ruthenians 1,936 0.05, Slovaks 4,753 0.11% Turks 367 0.01%, Ukrainians 1,878 0.04%, Vlachs 29 0.00%^{4} including Austrians 365 0.01%, Bulgarians 262 0.01%, Germans 3,034 0.08%, Jews 410 0.01%, Poles 657 0.02%, Romanians 337 0.01%, Russians 1,481 0.04%, Ruthenians 1,343 0.03, Slovaks 3,688 0.10% Turks 404 0.01%, Ukrainians 1,905 0.05%, Vlachs 22 0.00%

== Significant migrations ==
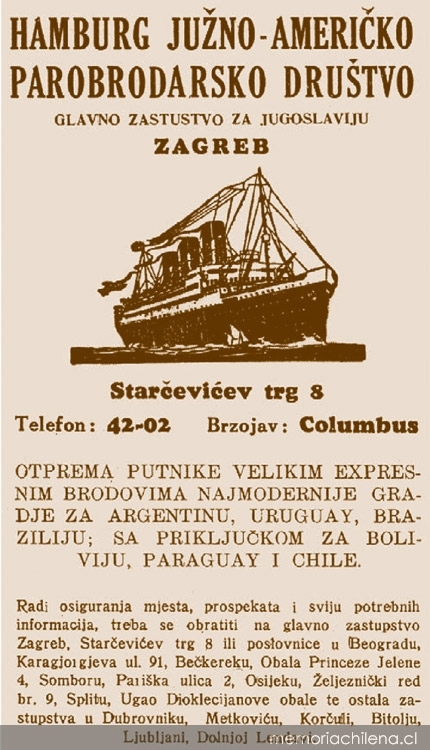
A 1930s ad for shipping lines to South America

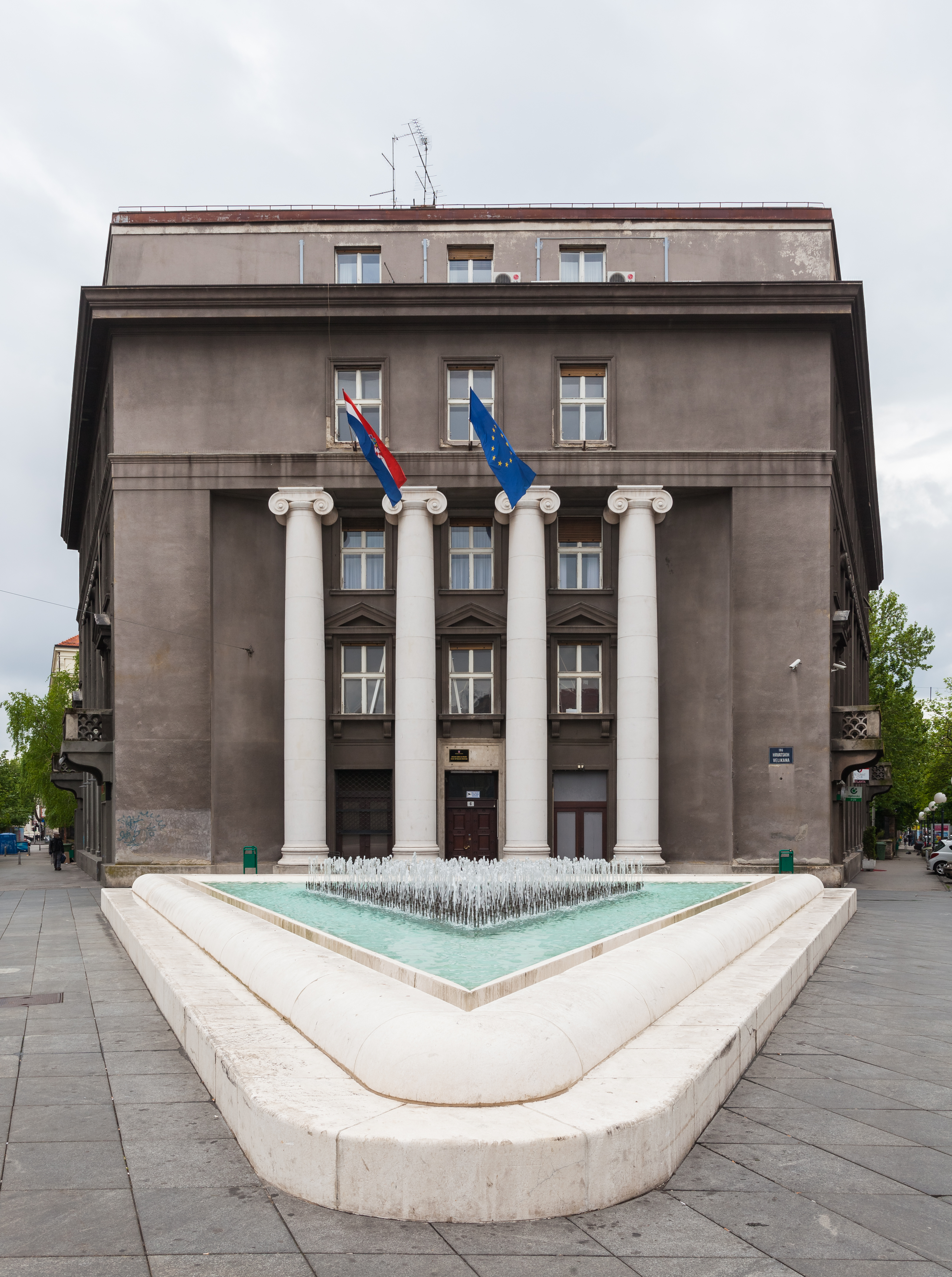
State Office for Croats Abroad in Zagreb

The demographic history of Croatia is characterised by significant migrations, starting with the arrival of the Croats in the area. According to the work De Administrando Imperio written by the 10th-century Byzantine Emperor Constantine VII, the Croats arrived in the area of modern-day Croatia in the early 7th century. However, that claim is disputed, and competing hypotheses date the event between the 6th and the 9th centuries. Following the establishment of a personal union of Croatia and Hungary in 1102, and the joining of the Habsburg Empire in 1527, the Hungarian and German-speaking population of Croatia began gradually increasing in number. The processes of Magyarization and Germanization varied in intensity but persisted to the 20th century. The increased military activity and Orthodox refugee populations from Bosnia and Serbia initiated by Ottoman conquests also caused a westward migration of parts of the Croatian population; the Burgenland Croats are direct descendants of some of those settlers. Serb migration into this region peaked during the Great Serb Migrations of 1690 and 1737–39. Similarly, Venetian Republic rule in Istria and in Dalmatia, following the Fifth and the Seventh Ottoman–Venetian Wars ushered gradual growth of Italian speaking population in those areas. Following the collapse of Austria-Hungary in 1918, the Hungarian population declined, especially in the areas north of the Drava river, where they represented the majority before World War I.

The period between 1890 and World War I was marked by large economic emigration from Croatia to the United States, and particularly to the areas of Pittsburgh, Pennsylvania, Cleveland, Ohio, and Chicago, Illinois. Besides the United States, the main destination of the migrants was South America, especially Argentina, Chile, Bolivia and Peru. It is estimated that 500,000 people left Croatia during this period. After World War I, the main focus of emigration shifted to Canada, where about 15,000 people settled before the onset of World War II. During World War II and in the period immediately following the war, there were further significant demographic changes as the German-speaking population, the Volksdeutsche, were either forced or otherwise compelled to leave—reducing their number from the prewar German population of Yugoslavia of 500,000, living in parts of present-day Croatia and Serbia, to the figure of 62,000 recorded in the 1953 census.

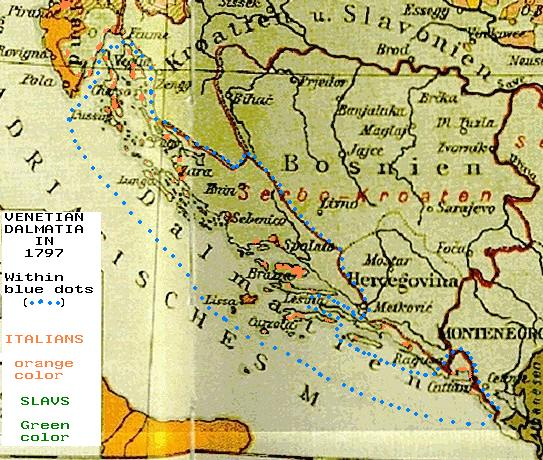
Austrian linguistic map from 1896. In green the areas where Slavs were the majority of the population, in orange the areas where Istrian Italians and Dalmatian Italians were the majority of the population. The boundaries of Venetian Dalmatia in 1797 are delimited with blue dots.

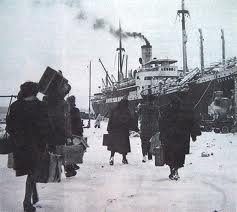
Istrian Italians leave Pola in 1947 during the Istrian-Dalmatian exodus.

After the fall of Napoleon (1814), Istria, Kvarner and Dalmatia were annexed to the Austrian Empire. Many Istrian Italians and Dalmatian Italians looked with sympathy towards the Risorgimento movement that fought for the unification of Italy. However, after the Third Italian War of Independence (1866), when the Veneto and Friuli regions were ceded by the Austrians to the newly formed Kingdom Italy, Istria and Dalmatia remained part of the Austro-Hungarian Empire, together with other Italian-speaking areas on the eastern Adriatic. This triggered the gradual rise of Italian irredentism among many Italians in Istria, Kvarner and Dalmatia, who demanded the unification of the Julian March, Kvarner and Dalmatia with Italy. Moreover, as Italian was the language of administration, education, the press, and the Austrian navy before 1859, people who wished to acquire higher social standing and separate from the Slav peasantry became Italians. In the years after 1866, Italians lost their privileges in Austria-Hungary, their assimilation of the Slavs came to an end, and they found themselves under growing pressure by other rising nations; with the rising Slav tide after 1890, italianized Slavs reverted to being Croats. Austrian rulers found use of the racial antagonism and financed Slav schools and promoted Croatian as the official language, and many Italians chose voluntary exile. Austrians carried out an aggressive anti-Italian policy.

Istrian Italians made up about a third of the population in Istria in 1900. The Italian-speaking population in Dalmatia, comprising 12.5% of the total population in 1865, was concentrated in the major coastal cities. In the city of Split in 1890 there were 1,971 Dalmatian Italians (9% of the population), in Zadar 7,672 (27%), in Šibenik 1,090 (5%), in Kotor 646 (12%) and in Dubrovnik 356 (3%). In the 1910 Austro-Hungarian census, Istria had a population of 57.8% Slavic-speakers (Croat and Slovene), and 38.1% Italian speakers. For the Austrian Kingdom of Dalmatia, (i.e. Dalmatia), the 1910 numbers were 96.2% Slavic speakers and 2.8% Italian speakers. In Rijeka the Italians were the relative majority in the municipality (48.61% in 1910), and in addition to the large Croatian community (25.95% in the same year), there was also a fair Hungarian minority (13.03%). According to the official Croatian census of 2011, there are 2,445 Italians in Rijeka (equal to 1.9% of the total population).

The 1947 Treaty of Peace with Italy provided for the right of option of Italian citizens living in the territories that were to be taken over by Greece, France, and Yugoslavia to remain Italian citizens, provided the possibility of request by those states that they moved out of the area within a year; it granted a similar right of option to Italian citizens who habitually spoke "one of the Yugoslav languages (Serbian, Croatian or Slovene)" and who lived in Italian territory. Some 300,000 inhabitants of the taken-over areas—predominantly ethnic Italians, but also tens of thousands of Croats and Slovenes—eventually left, in what was later called the Istrian–Dalmatian exodus. The emigrants, who had lived in the now Yugoslav territories of the Julian March (Karst Region and Istria), Kvarner and Dalmatia, largely went to Italy, but some joined the Italian diaspora in the Americas, Australia and South Africa.

According to the census organized in Croatia in 2001 and that organized in Slovenia in 2002, there were 2,258 Italians in Slovenia and 19,636 in Croatia. Since the dissolution of Yugoslavia, a significant portion of the population of Istria opted for a regional declaration in the census instead of a national one. As such, more people have Italian as a first language than those having declared Italian. In 2001, about 500 Dalmatian Italians were counted in Dalmatia. In particular, according to the official Croatian census of 2011, there are 83 Dalmatian Italians in Split (equal to 0.05% of the total population), 16 in Šibenik (0.03%) and 27 in Dubrovnik (0.06%). According to the official Croatian census of 2021, there are 63 Dalmatian Italians in Zadar (equal to 0.09% of the total population). According to the official Montenegrin census of 2011, there are 31 Dalmatian Italians in Kotor (equal to 0.14% of the total population).

The 1940s and the 1950s in Yugoslavia were marked by colonisation of settlements where the displaced Germans used to live by people from the mountainous parts of Bosnia and Herzegovina, Serbia and Montenegro, and migrations to larger cities spurred on by the development of industry. In the 1960s and 1970s, another wave of economic migrants left Croatia. They largely moved to Canada, Australia, New Zealand and Western Europe. During this period, 65,000 people left for Canada, and by the mid-1970s there were 150,000 Croats who moved to Australia. Particularly large European emigrant communities of Croats exist in Germany, Austria and Switzerland, which largely stem from the 1960s and 1970s migrations.

A series of significant migrations came as a result of the 1991–1995 Croatian War of Independence. In 1991, more than 100,000 Croats and other non-Serbs were displaced by the Croatian Serb forces or fled the violence in areas with significant Serb populations. During the final days of the war, in 1995, between 200,000 and 250,000 Serbs fled the country following the Operation Storm. Ten years after the war, only a small portion of Serb refugees returned out of the 400,000 displaced during the entire war. Most of the Serbs in Croatia who remained never lived in areas occupied during the Croatian War of Independence. Serbs have been only partially re-settled in the regions they previously inhabited; some of these areas were later settled by Croat refugees from Bosnia and Herzegovina.

Significant migrations have been happening after the accession of Croatia to the European Union, with a persistent growth since 2013, and the population leaving is largely younger and more educated.

=== Demographic losses in the 20th century wars and pandemics ===
In addition to demographic losses through significant migrations, the population of Croatia suffered significant losses due to wars and epidemics. In the 20th century alone, there were several such events. The first was World War I, when the loss of the population of Croatia amounted to an estimated 190,000 persons, or about 5.5% of the total population recorded by the 1910 census. The 1918 flu pandemic started to take its toll in Croatia in July 1918, with peaks of the disease occurring in October and November. Available data is scarce, but it is estimated that the pandemic caused at least 15,000–20,000 deaths. Around 295,000 people were killed on the territory of present-day Croatia during World War II, according to the demographer Bogoljub Kočović. The demise of the armed forces of the Independent State of Croatia and of the civilians accompanying the troops at the end of World War II was followed by the Yugoslav death march of Nazi collaborators. A substantial number of people were executed, but the exact number is disputed. The claims range from 12,000 to 15,000 to as many as 80,000 killed in May 1945. Finally, approximately 20,000 were killed or went missing during the 1991–1995 Croatian War of Independence. The figure pertains only to those persons who would have been recorded by the 1991 census as living in Croatia.

== Migration ==
=== International migration data of Croatia, 2014–present ===
Year	Immigrants	Emigrants	Net Migration
2014	10,638	20,858	−10,220
2015	11,706	29,651	−17,945
2016	13,985	36,436	−22,451
2017	15,553	47,352	−31,799
2018	26,029	39,515	−13,486
2019	37,726	40,148	−2,422
2020	33,414	34,046	−632
2021	35,912	40,424	−4,512
2022	57,972	46,287	11,685
2023	69,396	39,218	30,178
2024	70,391	38,997	31,394
2025	56,665	37,485	19,180

== Other demographic statistics ==
Demographic statistics according to the World Population Review.

- One birth every 14 minutes
- One death every 10 minutes
- Net loss of one person every 22 minutes
- One net migrant every 72 minutes

The following demographic statistics are from the CIA World Factbook.

Population
4,270,480 (July 2018 est.)

Age structure

Population pyramid of Croatia in 2017

0-14 years: 14.21% (male 312,805 /female 293,931)
15-24 years: 11.09% (male 242,605 /female 230,853)
25-54 years: 40.15% (male 858,025 /female 856,455)
55-64 years: 14.65% (male 304,054 /female 321,543)
65 years and over: 19.91% (male 342,025 /female 508,184) (2018 est.)

Median age
total: 44.4 years
male: 42.6 years
female: 46.1 years (2018 est.)

Birth rate
8.3 births/1,000 population (2023 est.)

Death rate
13.3 deaths/1,000 population (2023 est.)

Total fertility rate
1.53 children born/woman (2023 est.)

Net migration rate
−1.4 migrant(s)/1,000 population (2018 est.) Country comparison to the world: 150th

Population growth rate
−0.51% (2018 est.) Country comparison to the world: 221st

Mother's mean age at first birth
28 years (2014 est.)

Life expectancy at birth
total population: 76.3 years (2018 est.) Country comparison to the world: 87th
male: 73.2 years (2018 est.)
female: 79.6 years (2018 est.)

Ethnic groups
Croat 90.4%, Serb 4.4%, other 4.4% (including Bosniak, Hungarian, Slovene, Czech, and Romani), unspecified 0.8% (2011 est.)

Languages
Croatian (official) 95.6%, Serbian 1.2%, other 3% (including Hungarian, Czech, Slovak, and Albanian), unspecified 0.2% (2011 est.)

Religions
Roman Catholic 86.3%, Orthodox 4.4%, Muslim 1.5%, other 1.5%, unspecified 2.5%, not religious or atheist 3.8% (2011 est.)

Nationality
noun: Croat(s), Croatian(s)
adjective: Croatian
note: the French designation of "Croate" to Croatian mercenaries in the 17th century eventually became "Cravate" and later came to be applied to the soldiers' scarves – the cravat; Croatia celebrates Cravat Day every 18 October

Dependency ratios
total dependency ratio: 50.9 (2015 est.)
youth dependency ratio: 22.4 (2015 est.)
elderly dependency ratio: 28.5 (2015 est.)
potential support ratio: 3.5 (2015 est.)

Urbanization
urban population: 56.9% of total population (2018)
rate of urbanization: −0.08% annual rate of change (2015–20 est.)

Literacy

definition: age 15 and over can read and write (2015 est.)

total population: 99.3%
male: 99.7%
female: 98.9% (2015 est.)

School life expectancy (primary to tertiary education)
total: 15 years
male: 14 years
female: 16 years (2016)

Unemployment, youth ages 15–24
total: 31.3% (2016 est.) Country comparison to the world: 26th
male: 31.2% (2016 est.)
female: 31.3% (2016 est.)

== Languages ==
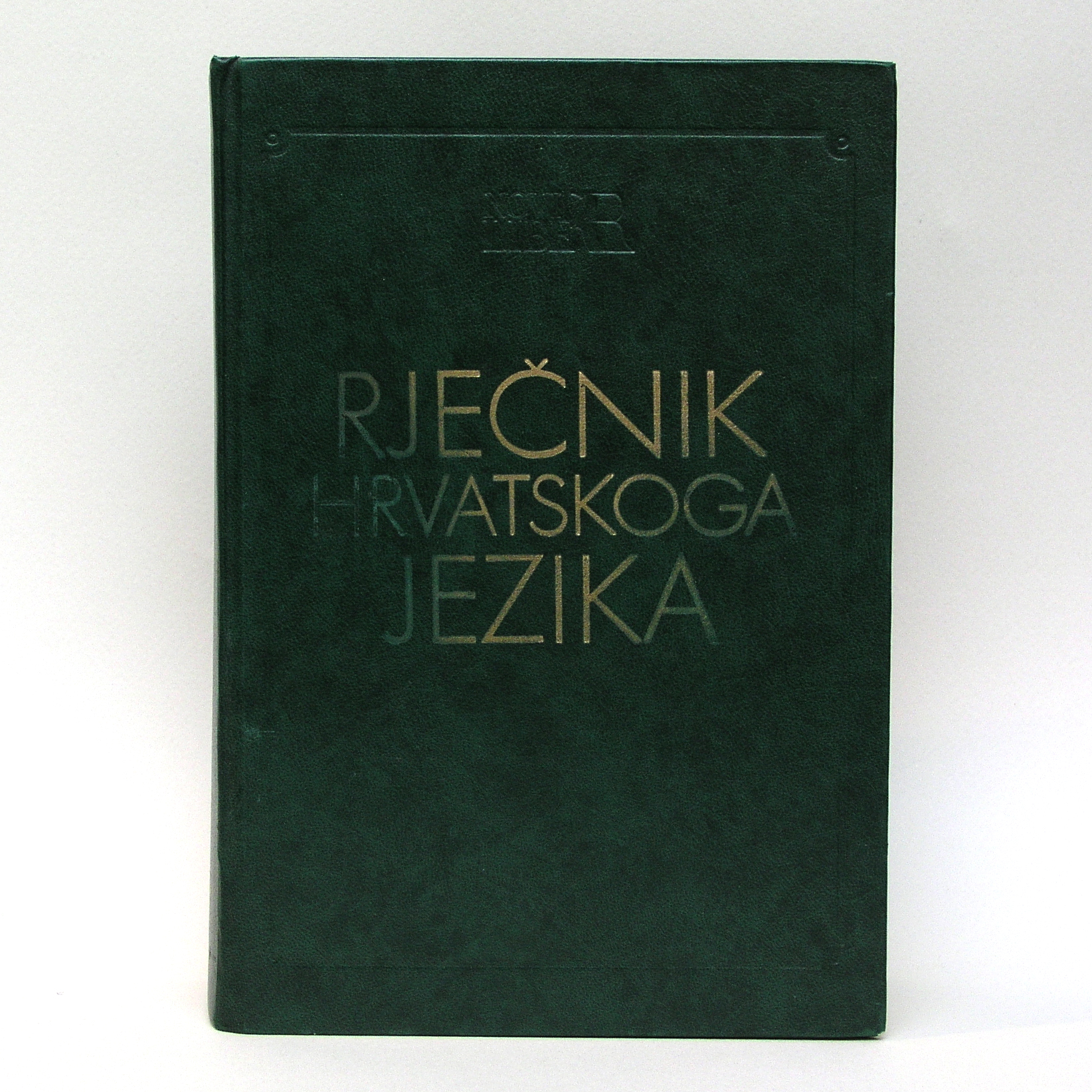
Croatian dictionary published by Vladimir Anić in 1991

Croatian is the official language of Croatia, and one of 24 official languages of the European Union since 2013. Minority languages are in official use in local government units where more than a third of the population consists of national minorities or where local legislation mandates their use. These languages are Czech, German, Hungarian, Italian, Ruthenian, Serbian, Slovene, and Slovak. Besides these, the following languages are also recognised: Albanian, Bosnian, Bulgarian, German, Hebrew, Macedonian, Montenegrin, Polish, Romanian, Romani, Russian, Rusyn, Slovenian, Turkish and Ukrainian. According to the 2021 Census, 95.25% of citizens of Croatia declared Croatian as their native language, 1.16% declared Serbian as their native language, while no other language is represented in Croatia by more than 0.5% of native speakers among the population of Croatia.

In the region of Dalmatia, each city historically spoke a variant of the Dalmatian language. It developed from Latin like all Romance languages, but became heavily influenced by Venetian and Croatian. The language fell out of use in the region by the 16th century and went extinct when the last speaker died in 1898.

Croatian replaced Latin as the official language of the Croatian government in 1847. The Croatian lect is generally viewed as one of the four standard varieties of the Shtokavian dialect of Serbo-Croatian, a South Slavic language. Croatian is written using the Latin alphabet and there are three major dialects spoken on the territory of Croatia, with the Shtokavian idiom used as the literary standard. The Chakavian and Kajkavian dialects are distinguished by their lexicon, phonology, and syntax.

From 1961 to 1991, the official language was formally designated as Serbo-Croatian or Croato-Serbian. Even during socialist rule, Croats often referred to their language as Croato-Serbian (instead of Serbo-Croatian) or as Croatian. Croatian and Serbian variants of the language were not officially recognised as separate at the time, but referred to as the "West" and "East" versions, and preferred different alphabets: the Gaj's Latin alphabet and Karadžić's Cyrillic alphabet. Croats are protective of their language from foreign influences, as the language was under constant change and threats imposed by previous rulers (i.e. Austrian German, Hungarian, Italian and Turkish words were changed and altered to "Slavic" looking/sounding ones).

A 2009 survey revealed that 78% of Croats claim knowledge of at least one foreign language. According to a survey ordered by the European Commission in 2005, 49% of Croats speak English as their second language, 34% speak German, and 14% speak Italian. French and Russian are spoken by 4% each, and 2% of Croats speak Spanish. A substantial proportion of Slovenes (59%) have a certain level of knowledge of Croatian.

== Religion ==
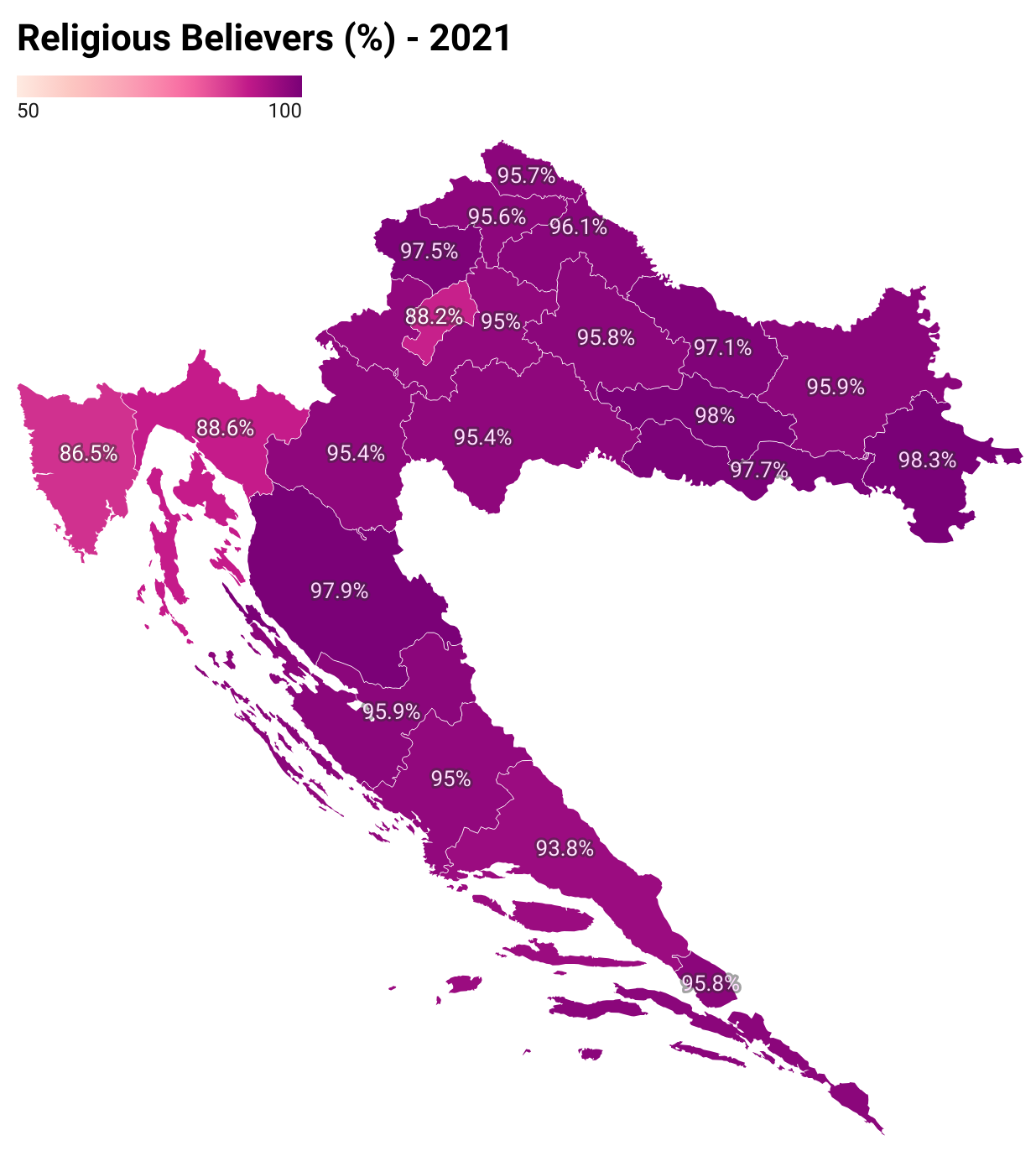
Religious Believers (%) by County – 2021 Census

Religion in Croatia (2021 census)
1. Catholicism (83.0%)
2. Eastern Orthodoxy (3.35%)
3. Protestantism (0.26%)
4. Other Christian (0.73%)
5. No religion (6.39%)
6. Others (1.87%)
7. Islam (1.32%)
8. Undeclared (3.86%)

The main religions of Croatia are Roman Catholicism 83.04%, no religion 6.39%, other Christianity 0.73%, undeclared 3.86%, Eastern Orthodoxy 3.35%, Islam 1.32%, Protestantism 0.26%, others 1.87%. In the Eurostat Eurobarometer Poll of 2005, 67% of the population of Croatia responded that "they believe there is a God" and 7% said they do not believe "there is any sort of spirit, God, or life force", while 25% expressed a belief in "some sort of spirit or life force". In a 2009 Gallup poll, 70% answered affirmatively when asked "Is religion an important part of your daily life?" Significantly, a 2008 Gallup survey of the Balkans indicated church and religious organisations as the most trusted institutions in the country. The survey revealed that 62% of the respondents assigned "a lot" or "some" trust to those institutions, ranking them ahead of all types of governmental, international or non-governmental institutions.

Public schools allow religious education, in cooperation with religious communities that have agreements with the government, but attendance is not mandatory. The classes are organized widely in public elementary and secondary schools. In 2009, 92% of elementary school pupils and 87% of secondary school students attended the religious education classes. Public holidays in Croatia also include the religious festivals of Epiphany, Easter Monday, Feast of Corpus Christi, Assumption Day, All Saints' Day, Christmas, and St. Stephen's or Boxing Day. The religious festival public holidays are based on the Catholic liturgical year, but citizens of the Republic of Croatia who celebrate different religious holidays have the right not to work on those dates. This includes Christians who celebrate Christmas on 7 January per the Julian calendar, Muslims on the days of Eid al-Fitr and Eid al-Adha, and Jews on the days of Rosh Hashanah and Yom Kippur. Marriages performed by the religious communities having agreements with the state are officially recognized, eliminating the need to register the marriages in a registrar office.

The legal position of religious communities is defined by special legislation, specifically regarding government funding, tax benefits, and religious education in schools. Other matters are left to each religious community to negotiate separately with the government. Registration of the communities is not mandatory, but registered communities become legal persons and enjoy tax and other benefits. The law stipulates that to be eligible for registration, a religious group must have at least 500 believers and be registered as a civil association for 5 years. Religious groups based abroad must submit written permission for registration from their country of origin.

== Education ==
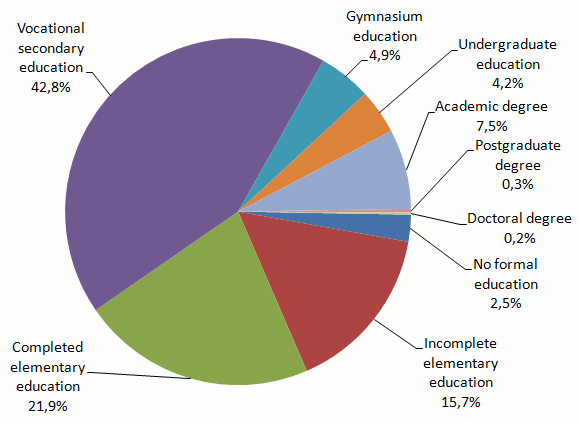
Education completed by population of Croatia (over age of 14) according to 2001 census. The segment achieving academic degrees more than doubled by 2008.

Literacy in Croatia is 98.1 percent. The 2001 census reported that 15.7% of the population over the age of 14 has an incomplete elementary education, and 21.9% has only an elementary school education. 42.8% of the population over the age of 14 has a vocational education and 4.9% completed gymnasium. 4.2% of the same population received an undergraduate degree, while 7.5% received an academic degree, and 0.5% received a postgraduate or a doctoral degree. Croatia recorded a substantial growth of the population attaining academic degrees and by 2008, this population segment was estimated to encompass 16.7% of the total population of Croatians 15 and over. A worldwide study about the quality of living in different countries published by Newsweek in August 2010 ranked the Croatian education system at 22nd, a position shared with Austria. In 2004, it was estimated that 4.5% of the GDP is spent for education, while schooling expectancy was estimated to 14 years on average. Primary education in Croatia starts at the age of six or seven and consists of eight grades. In 2007 a law was passed to increase free, noncompulsory education until 18 years of age. Compulsory education consists of eight grades of elementary school. Secondary education is provided by gymnasiums and vocational schools. As of 2010, there are 2,131 elementary schools and 713 schools providing various forms of secondary education. Primary and secondary education are also available in languages of recognised minorities in Croatia, where classes are held in Czech, Hungarian, Italian, Serbian and German languages.

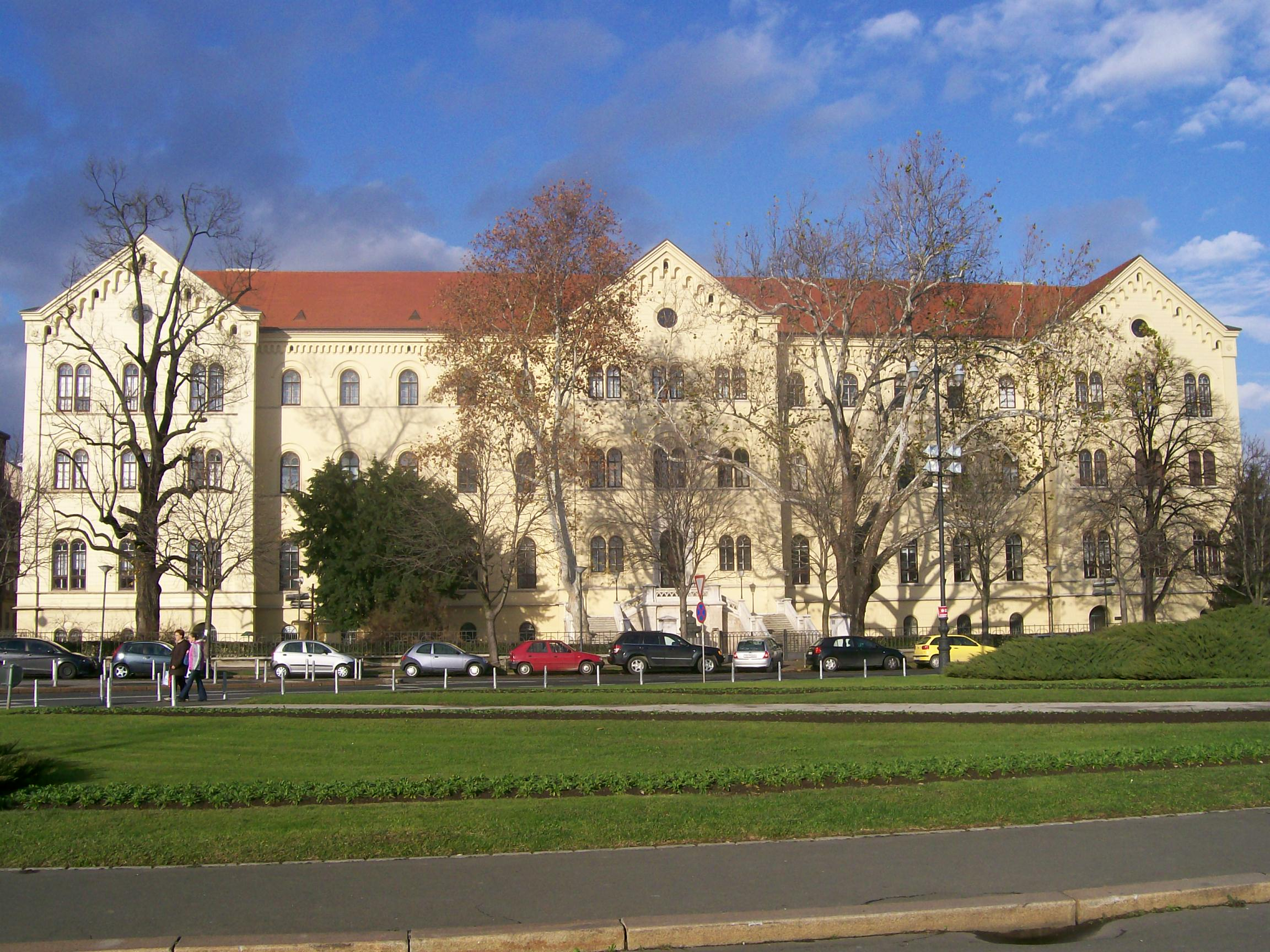
The University of Zagreb

There are 84 elementary level and 47 secondary level music and art schools, as well as 92 schools for disabled children and youth and 74 schools for adults. Nationwide leaving exams (Croatian: državna matura) were introduced for secondary education students in the 2009–2010 school year. It comprises three compulsory subjects (Croatian language, mathematics, and a foreign language) and optional subjects and is a prerequisite for a university education.

Croatia has ten public universities, the University of Zagreb, University of Split, University of Rijeka, University of Osijek, University of Zadar, University of Dubrovnik, University of Pula, University of Slavonski Brod, and Dr. Franjo Tuđman University of Defence and Security. The University of Zadar, the first university in Croatia, was founded in 1396 and remained active until 1807, when other institutions of higher education took over. It was reopened in 2002. The University of Zagreb, founded in 1669, is the oldest continuously operating university in Southeast Europe. There are also 11 polytechnics and 23 higher education institutions, of which 19 are private. In total, there are 132 institutions of higher education in Croatia, attended by more than 145 thousand students.

There are 205 companies, government or education system institutions and non-profit organizations in Croatia pursuing scientific research and the development of technology. Combined, they spent more than 3 billion kuna (400 million euro) and employed 10,191 full-time research staff in 2008. Among the scientific institutes operating in Croatia, the largest is the Ruđer Bošković Institute in Zagreb. The Croatian Academy of Sciences and Arts in Zagreb is a learned society promoting language, culture, arts and science since its inception in 1866. Scientists from Croatia include inventors and Nobel Prize winners.

== Health ==
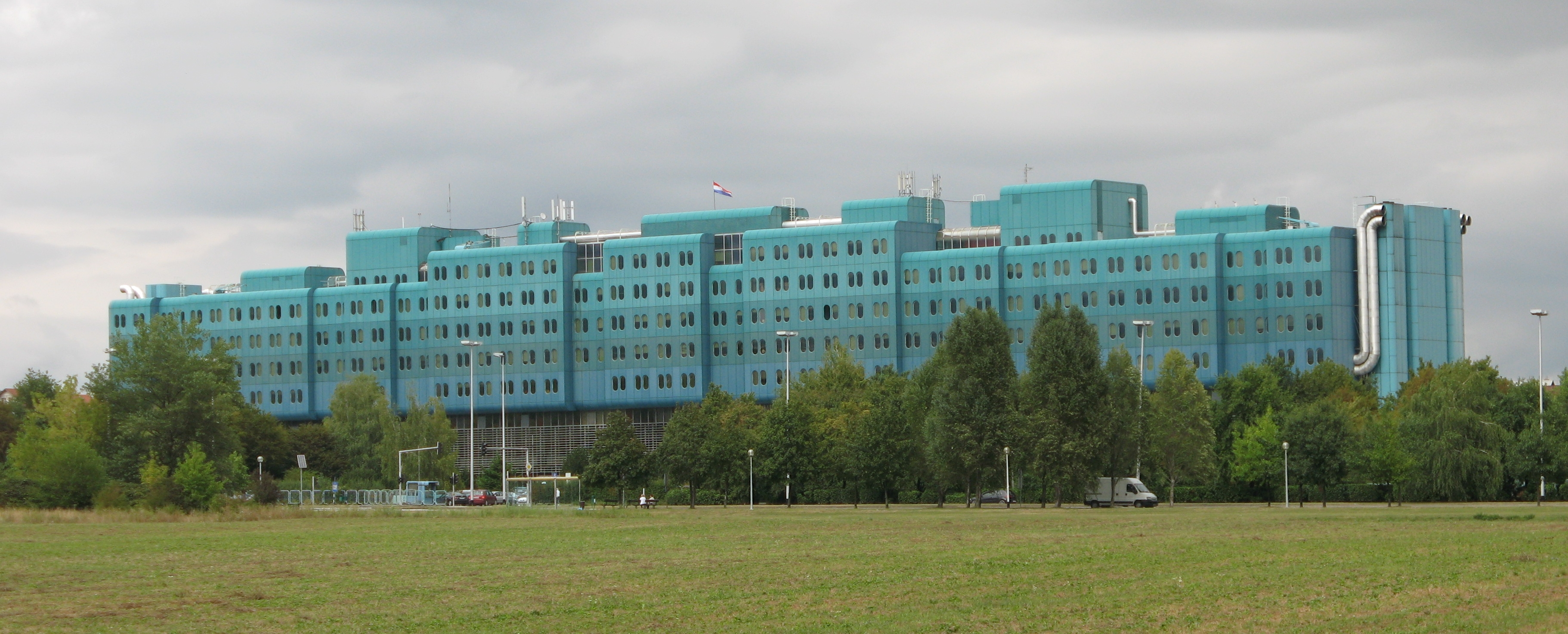
Clinical Hospital Dubrava in Zagreb

Croatia has a universal health care system, the roots of which can be traced back to the Hungarian-Croatian Parliament Act of 1891, providing a form of mandatory insurance for all factory workers and craftsmen. The population is covered by a basic health insurance plan provided by statute and optional insurance. In 2014, the annual compulsory healthcare related expenditures reached 21.8 billion kuna (2.9 billion euro). Healthcare expenditures comprise only 0.6% of private health insurance and public spending. In 2010, Croatia spent 6.9% of its GDP on healthcare, representing a decline from approximately 8% estimated in 2008, when 84% of healthcare spending came from public sources. According to the World Health Organization (WHO), Croatia ranks around the 50th in the world in terms of life expectancy.

There are hundreds of healthcare institutions in Croatia, including 79 hospitals and clinics with 23,967 beds. The hospitals and clinics care for more than 700 thousand patients per year and employ 5,205 medical doctors, including 3,929 specialists. There are 6,379 private practice offices, and a total of 41,271 health workers in the country. There are 63 emergency medical service units, responding to more than a million calls. The principal cause of death in 2008 was cardiovascular disease at 43.5% for men and 57.2% for women, followed by tumours, at 29.4% for men and 21.4% for women. Other significant causes of death are injuries, poisonings and other external causes (7.7% men/3.9% women), digestive system diseases (5.7% men/3.6% women), respiratory system diseases (5.1% men/3.5% women) and endocrine, nutritional and metabolic diseases (2.1% men/3.0% women). There is no other cause of disease affecting more than 3% of the population. In 2014 only 22 Croatians had been infected with HIV/AIDS and 4 had died from the disease. In 2008 it was estimated by the WHO that 27.4% of Croatians over age of 15 were smokers. According to 2003 WHO data, 22% of the Croatian adult population is obese.

Life expectancy in Croatia since 1950

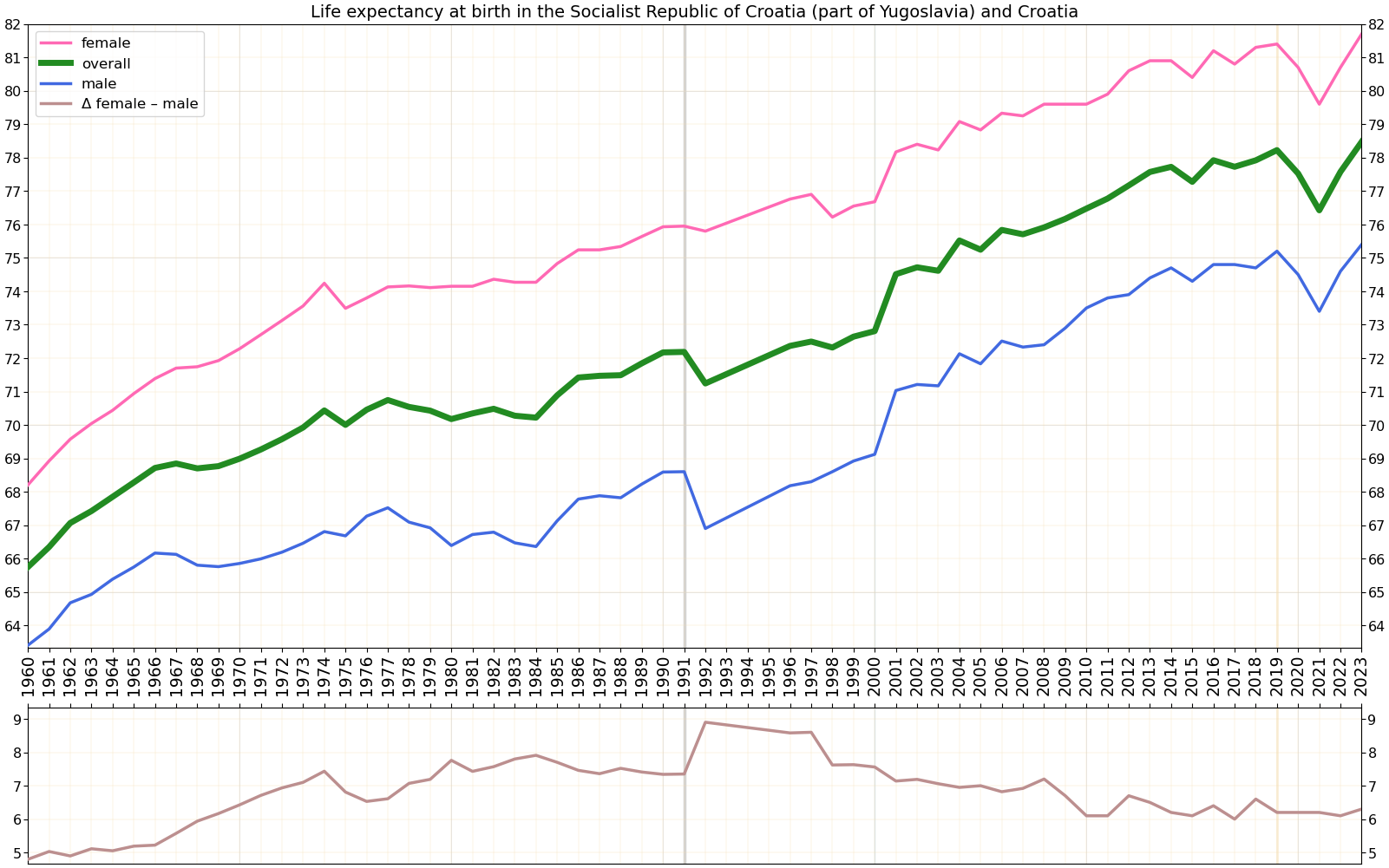
Life expectancy in Croatia since 1960 by gender

Period	Life expectancy in Years
1950–1955	61.26
1955–1960	▲63.64
1960–1965	▲65.72
1965–1970	▲67.46
1970–1975	▲69.02
1975–1980	▲69.90
1980–1985	▲70.59
1985–1990	▲71.88
1990–1995	▲72.81
1995–2000	▲74.58
2000–2005	▲74.94
2005–2010	▲76.09
2010–2015	▲77.05

== Economic indicators ==
=== Personal income, jobs and unemployment ===
Net monthly income in September 2011 averaged 5,397 kuna (c. 729 euro), dropping 2.1% relative to the previous month. In the same month, gross monthly income averaged 7,740 kuna (c. 1,046 euro), and it includes the net salary along with income tax, retirement pension insurance, healthcare insurance, occupational safety and health insurance and employment promotion tax. The average net monthly income grew compared to 5,311 kuna (c. 717 euro) in 2009 or 3,326 kuna (c. 449 euro) in 2000. The highest net salaries were paid in financial services sector, and in April 2011 those averaged 10,041 kuna (c. 1,356 euro), while the lowest ones, paid in the same month, were in the manufacturing and leather processing industries, averaging at 2,811 kuna (c. 380 euro). Since January 2016, the minimum wage in Croatia is 3,120 kuna before tax (c. 400 euro).

Number of employed persons recorded steady growth between 2000 and 2008 when it peaked, followed by 4% decline in 2009. That year, there were 1.499 million employed persons, with 45% of that number pertaining to women. The total number of employed persons includes 252,000 employed in crafts and freelance professionals and 35,000 employed in agriculture. The most significant sources of employment in 2008 were manufacturing industry and wholesale and retail trade (including motor vehicle repair services) employing 278,640 and 243,640 respectively. Further significant employment sector was construction industry comprising 143,336 jobs that year. In the same year, more than 100,000 were employed in public administration, defence and compulsory social insurance sector as well as in education. Since 2009, negative trends persisted in Croatia with jobs in the industry declined further by 3.5%. Number of unemployed and retired persons combined exceeded number of employed in August 2010, as it fell to 1.474 million. In 2009, labour force consisted of 1.765 million persons out of 3.7 million working age population—aged 15 and over. In October 2011, unemployment rate stood at 17.4%. 7.2% of employed persons hold a second job.

In comparison with the member states of the European Union (EU), Croatia's median equivalent household income in terms of the Purchasing Power Standard (PPS) stands at 470, topping average PPS of the ten countries which joined the EU in 2004 (EU10), as well as Romania and Bulgaria, while significantly lagging behind the EU average. Within Croatia, the highest PPS is recorded in Istria County (769), the City of Zagreb (640) and the Primorje-Gorski Kotar County (576). The lowest PPS is observed in the Bjelovar-Bilogora County and the Virovitica-Podravina County (267).

=== Urbanisation and housing ===
2011 census recorded a total of 1,534,148 private households in Croatia as well as 1,487 other residential communities such as retirement homes, convents etc. At the same time, there were 1,923,522 permanent housing units—houses and apartments. 2001 census recorded 1.66 million permanent housing units, including 196 thousand intermittently occupied and 42 thousand abandoned ones. Average size of a permanently used housing unit is 74.4 square metres (801 square feet). The intermittently used housing units include 182 thousand vacation houses and 8 thousand houses used during agricultural works. The same census also recorded 25 thousand housing units used for business purposes only. As of 2007, 71% of the households owned their own housing and had no mortgage or other loans to repay related to the housing, while further 9% were repaying loans for their housing. The households vary by type and include single households (13%), couples (15%), single parent households (4%), couples with children (27%) and extended family households (20%). There are approximately 500 homeless persons in Croatia, largely living in Zagreb.

Average urbanisation rate in Croatia stands at 56%, with the maximum rate recorded within the territory of the City of Zagreb, where it reached 94.5% and Zagreb metropolitan area comprising the City of Zagreb and the Zagreb County, where it stands at 76.4%. Very significant rate of urbanisation was observed in the second half of the 20th century. 1953 census recorded 57% of population which was active in agriculture, while a census performed in 1991 noted only 9.1% of population active in that field. This points to augmentation of urban population and reduction of rural population.

== See also ==
- Croats
- Croatian diaspora
- Croatian Bureau of Statistics
- Yugoslavia § Demographics
  - Demographics of the Kingdom of Yugoslavia
  - Demographics of the Socialist Federal Republic of Yugoslavia

== Sources ==
- Ostroški, Ljiljana, ed. (December 2015). Statistički ljetopis Republike Hrvatske 2015 [Statistical Yearbook of the Republic of Croatia 2015] (PDF). Statistical Yearbook of the Republic of Croatia (in Croatian and English). Vol. 47. Zagreb: Croatian Bureau of Statistics. ISSN 1333-3305.
- Seton-Watson, Christopher (1967). Italy from Liberalism to Fascism, 1870–1925. Methuen & Co.
