= Montenegrins of Croatia =

Montenegrins of Croatia Crnogorci Hrvatske Црногорци Хрватске
- (Croatia) (Montenegro)

Total population
- 3,127 (2021)

Regions with significant populations
- City of Zagreb, Istria County, Primorje-Gorski Kotar County, Split-Dalmatia County, Osijek-Baranja County, Dubrovnik-Neretva County

Languages
- Montenegrin, Croatian

Religion
- Montenegrin Orthodox, Roman Catholic and Muslim minority

Related ethnic groups
- Montenegrins

The Montenegrins of Croatia (Croatian: Crnogorci Hrvatske) are a national minority in the republic. According to the 2021 census, there are 3,127 ethnic Montenegrins in Croatia. The highest number of Montenegrins in Croatia is in the Croatian capital Zagreb.

Montenegrins are officially recognized as an autochthonous national minority, and as such, they elect a special representative to the Croatian Parliament, shared with members of four other national minorities.

== History ==
In 1657, the Doge of Venice Bertuccio Valiero, resettled the Istria regional city of Peroj (modern-day Croatia), with five families (Brcela, Draković, Brajić, Vučeta, and Ljubotina) from the Cernizza region (modern-day Montenegro). Following the Cretan War of 1645–1669, twenty other families originally migrated to Peroj. Today Peroj is the centre of the Montenegrins in Istria County, Croatia.

== Demographics ==
Montenegrins in the 2001 and 2011 censuses:

County	Number in the 2001 census	% of all Montenegrins in Croatia	Number in the 2011 census	% of all Montenegrins in Croatia
City of Zagreb	1,313	26.65%	1,191	26.37%
Istria County	732	14.86%	759	16.80%
Primorje-Gorski Kotar County	643	13.05%	642	14.21%
Split-Dalmatia County	593	12.04%	485	10.74%
Dubrovnik-Neretva County	370	7.51%	307	6.80%
Osijek-Baranja County	352	7.15%	319	7.08%
Zagreb County	135	2.74%	130	2.88%
Vukovar-Srijem County	119	2.41%	97	2.15%
Zadar County	112	2.27%	100	2.21%
Bjelovar-Bilogora County	83	1.68%	63	1.39%
Šibenik-Knin County	75	1.52%	66	1.46%
Karlovac County	74	1.50%	62	1.37%
Sisak-Moslavina County	70	1.42%	68	1.51%
Brod-Posavina County	54	1.10%	41	0.91%
Virovitica-Podravina County	43	0.87%	42	0.93%
Varazdin County	42	0.85%	43	0.95%
Međimurje County	31	0.63%	26	0.58%
Koprivnica-Krizevci County	29	0.59%	36	0.80%
Pozega-Slavonia County	22	0.45%	14	0.31%
Krapina-Zagorje County	13	0.26%	10	0.22%
Lika-Senj County	8	0.16%	16	0.35%
Total	4,926	100%	4,517	100%

== See also ==
- Croatia–Montenegro relations
- Demographics of Croatia
- Croats of Montenegro

== Sources ==
- 2001 census of Croatia
