= Poles in Croatia =

Ethnic group in Croatia

Polacy w Chorwacji Poljaci u Hrvatskoj

Total population
- 672

Regions with significant populations
- Zagreb: 166

Languages
- Croatian, Polish

Religion
- Roman Catholicism

Related ethnic groups
- Czechs, Slovaks

Poles in Croatia (Croatian: Poljaci u Hrvatskoj; Polish: Polacy w Chorwacji) are one of 22 national minorities in Croatia. According to the 2011 Census, there were 672 Poles living in Croatia, with the largest concentration in Zagreb.

== History ==
The first Poles arrived in the Republic of Dubrovnik during the Middle Ages, primarily as military mercenaries. In the late 18th century, Dubrovnik served as a temporary residence for the Bar Confederates, who planned to move to the Ottoman Empire to establish a Polish legion. During the 19th and early 20th centuries, Croatia became a destination for Polish intellectuals, political elites, and highly skilled professionals (such as engineers and physicians). Polish students attended military schools in Rijeka and Pula. Under Habsburg rule in the late 19th century, Polish farmers were settled in parts of Bosnia and Herzegovina to introduce modern agricultural techniques. Large groups of them also relocated to Croatian Slavonia. According to the 1910 census, the Polish population in Croatia and Slavonia was 2,312; by 1931, it increased to 3,875. During the interwar period, many Poles were employed in the textile industry. After World War II, in 1946–1948, around a thousand Poles returned from Croatia to Poland through government-organized repatriation.

Another period of Polish migration to Croatia occurred between the 1960s and 1980s, largely due to mixed marriages. By the beginning of the 21st century, Croatia was home to about 2,000 people of Polish background. At that time, university-trained individuals made up most of the Polish minority, which was predominantly composed of women.

The remnants of the Polish community that settled in Slavonia in the 19th century has become Croatized, but its descendants retain knowledge of their Polish origins. Migrants from the second half of the 20th century, now concentrated in Zagreb, tend to preserve their Polish identity and participate in Polish organizations, while within their families, two national identities often coexist.

== Culture and education ==
Poles are officially recognized as an ethnic minority in Croatia. Croatian Poles have established several Polish organizations and cultural societies – Ognisko Polskie, active during the interwar period, and modern Polish cultural associations: Mikolaj Kopernik in Zagreb, Fryderyk Chopin in Rijeka, Polonez in Split, Wisła in Osijek, and Morskie Oko in Zadar. Additionally, there is the Polish Educational Society and two Polish schools located in Zagreb and Split. The University of Zagreb hosts a Department of Polish Language and Literature.

== Past population figures ==
Official name of Croatia	Year	Number
–	1910	2,312
–	1931	3,875
PR Croatia	1948	27,830^{1}
PR Croatia	1953	1,575
PR Croatia	1961	1,151
SR Croatia	1971	819
SR Croatia	1981	758
Republic of Croatia	1991	679
Republic of Croatia	2001	567
^1 In the 1948 census the Poles were amongst the "others" (Central Bureau of Statistics)

== Notable people of Polish ancestry in Croatia ==
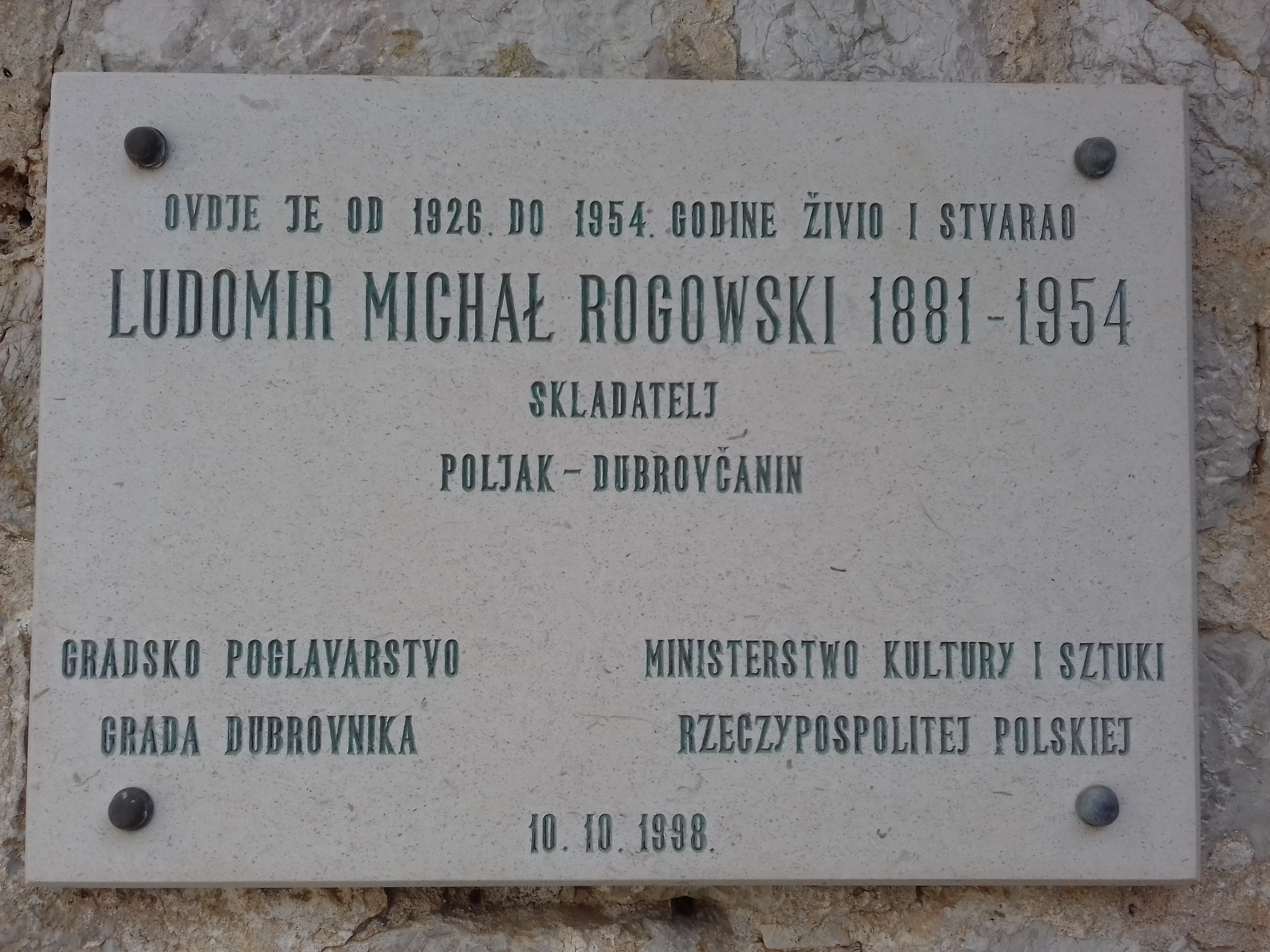
Plaque in memory of conductor Ludomir Michał Rogowski at St. Jakov Monastery in Dubrovnik

- Ferdo Becić (1844–1916), writer
- Aleksandar Flaker (1924–2010), literary scholar
- Fostač family
  - Benedikt Fostač
  - Antun Fostač
  - Verena (Janja) Fostač
  - Ignacije Fostač
- Adolf Hudovski (1828–1900), businessman and financial expert
- Vanda Kochansky-Devidé (1915–1990), paleontologist
- Alfred Freddy Krupa (1915–1989), artist and inventor
- Emilij Laszowski (1868–1949) (paternally Polish), historian and archivist
- Matilda Lesić (1845–1909), mezzosopranist
- Adolf Mošinsky (1843–1907) (Polish: Adolf Moszyński), descendant of Bar Confederates, three-time mayor of Zagreb
- Feliks Niedzielski (1912−1947), poet
- Milivoj Omašić (born 1945, grandfather was Polish), basketball player and television producer
- Slavoljub Penkala (1871–1922) (paternally Polish), inventor
- Bronisława Prašek-Całczyńska (1887−1969), physician
- Ludomir Michał Rogowski (1881−1954), conductor

== See also ==
- Croatia–Poland relations
- Polish diaspora
- Ethnic groups in Croatia
- Poles in Bosnia and Herzegovina
