= Slovenes of Croatia =

Slovenes of Croatia Slovenci u Hrvatskoj
Total population
- 10,517

Regions with significant populations
- Primorje-Gorski Kotar: 2,300
- Zagreb: 2,132
- Istria County: 1,793

Languages
- Slovene; Croatian

Religion
- Roman Catholicism

Slovenes of Croatia (Croatian: Slovenci Hrvatske, Slovene: Slovenci na Hrvaškem) are one of 22 national minorities in Croatia. According to 2011 census, there were 10,517 Slovenes in Croatia, with majority (approximately 60%) living in only three counties Istria County, Primorje-Gorski Kotar County and consolidated city-county Zagreb.

Slovenes are officially recognized as an autochthonous national minority, and as such, they elect a special representative to the Croatian Parliament, shared with members of four other national minorities.

== Demographics ==
=== Historical ===
Official name of Croatia	Year	Number of Slovenes
Sava Banovina and Littoral Banovina (later Banovina of Croatia)	1931	37,066
People's Republic of Croatia	1948	38,734
People's Republic of Croatia	1953	43,482
People's Republic of Croatia	1961	39,103
Socialist Republic of Croatia	1971	32,497
Socialist Republic of Croatia	1981	25,360
Republic of Croatia	1991	22,376
Republic of Croatia	2001	13,173
Republic of Croatia	2011	10,517
(Croatian Bureau of Statistics)

=== 2011 Census ===
County	Number of Slovenes
Primorje-Gorski Kotar	2,300
City of Zagreb	2,132
Istria	1,793
Split-Dalmatia	575
Zagreb	527
Međimurje	516
Varaždin	496
Osijek-Baranja	480
Krapina-Zagorje	408
Remaining counties combined	1290
Total	10,517
(2011 Census)

== Culture ==
Slovene minority in Croatia has "Central library of Slovenes in Republic of Croatia" in Karlovac.

== Associations ==
- Association of Slovenian Societies in Croatia (umbrella organization of most listed below)
- Cultural and Educational Society "Slovenski dom", Zagreb
- Cultural and Educational Society "Slovenski dom Bazovica", Rijeka
- Slovene Cultural Society "Triglav", Split
- Society of Slovenes "Dr. France Prešeren", Šibenik
- Slovene Cultural Society "Lipa", Dubrovnik
- Slovene Cultural Society "Lipa", Zadar
- Slovene Cultural Society "Istra", Pula
- Slovene Cultural and Artistic Society "Snežnik", Lovran
- Society of Slovenes "Labin", Labin
- Cultural Society "Slovenski dom Karlovac", Karlovac
- Slovene Cultural Society "Stanko Vraz", Osijek
- Slovene Cultural Society "Oljka", Poreč

== Notable people ==
Notable people with Slovene roots include:

- Stanko Vraz - poet (Slovene born)
- Anton Mahnič - bishop (Slovene born)
- Josip Križaj - opera singer
- Josip Broz Tito - president (Slovene mother)
- Mišo Broz - diplomat
- Žarko Dolinar - biologist and table tennis player
- Ivan Snoj - handball player
- Iztok Puc - handball player (Slovene born)
- Dragan Holcer - football player
- Franjo Bučar - writer and sport populazer
- Mira Furlan - actress and singer (Slovene father)
- Vladko Maček - politician (Slovene father)
- Josip Srebrnič - prelate
- Marijan Žužej - water polo player
- Dubravko Šimenc - water polo player
- Zlatko Šimenc - water polo player
- Josip Bobi Marotti - actor
- Marin Šotiček - football player (Born in Slovenia, to ethnic Slovenian parents from Croatia)

== See also ==
- Croatia–Slovenia relations
- Croats of Slovenia
- Slovenian diaspora
- Ethnic groups in Croatia
