= Bulgarians in Croatia =

Total population
- 350

Languages
- Croatian, Bulgarian

Religion
- Bulgarian Orthodox (45%) Catholic (23%)

Related ethnic groups
- Croatian Macedonians

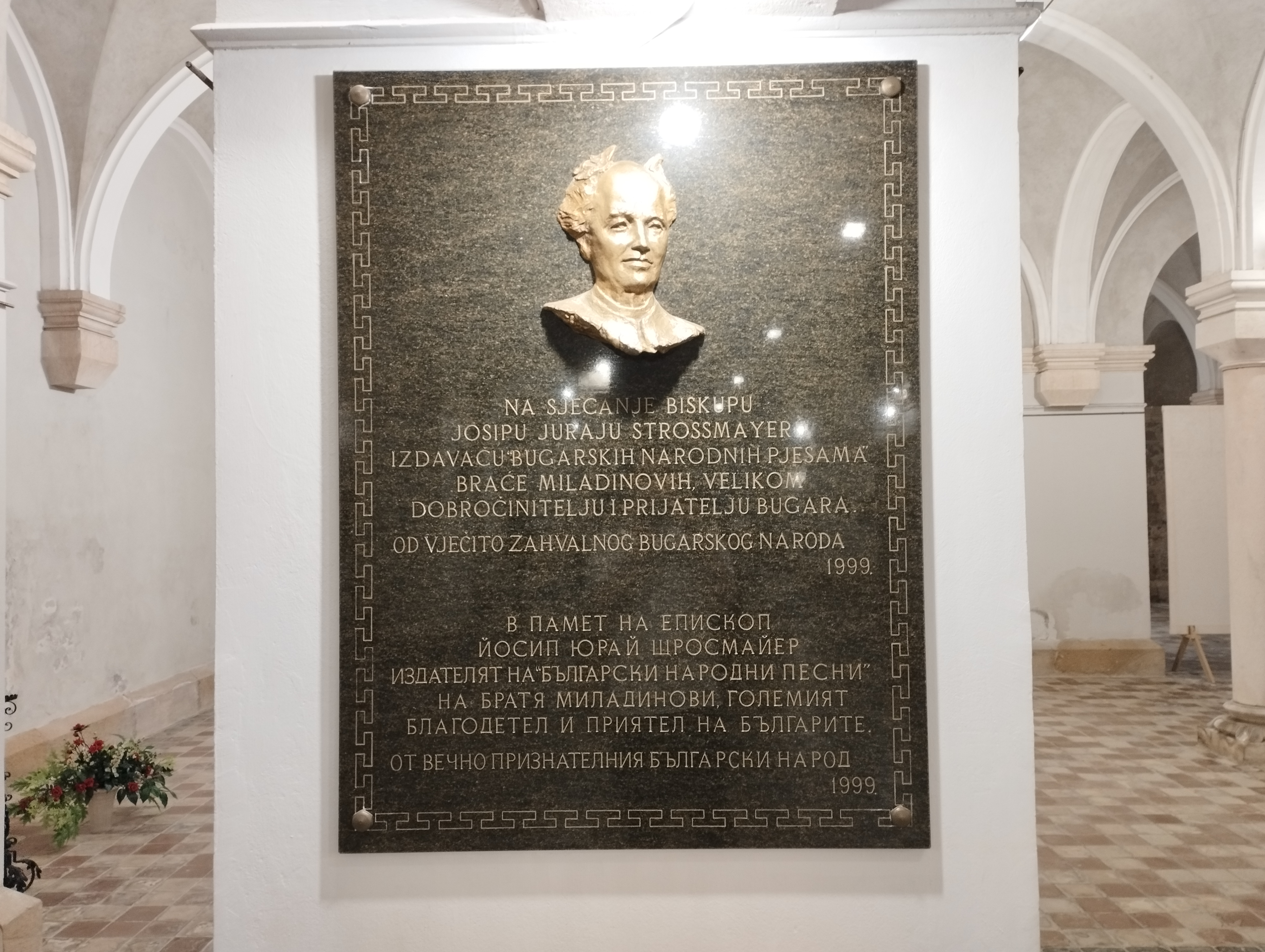
Bulgarian memorial in the krypt of the Đakovo Cathedral.

Bulgarians in Croatia (Croatian: Bugari Hrvatske, Bulgarian: Българи в Хърватия) are one of 22 national minorities in Croatia. According to the last census from 2011, there were 872 Bulgarians living in Croatia, most of them in Zagreb.

Bulgarians are officially recognized as an autochthonous national minority, and as such, they elect a special representative to the Croatian Parliament, shared with members of eleven other national minorities.

== Number of Bulgarians ==
Formal name of Croatia	Year	Number of Bulgarians
part of Yugoslavia	1931	606
People's Republic of Croatia	1948	637
People's Republic of Croatia	1953	464
People's Republic of Croatia	1961	593
Socialist Republic of Croatia	1971	676
Socialist Republic of Croatia	1981	441
Republic of Croatia	1991	458
Republic of Croatia	2001	331
Republic of Croatia	2011	350
(Croatian Bureau of Statistics)

== 2011 census ==
County	Bulgarians	Total percentage
City of Zagreb	120	42.86%
Split-Dalmatia	48	13.71%
Istria	34	9.71%
Osijek-Baranja	26	7.43%
Primorje-Gorski Kotar	24	6.86%
Zagreb	16	4.57%
Bjelovar Bilogora	12	3.43%
Brod-Posavina	10	2.86%
Zadar	10	2.86%
Varaždin	9	2.57%
Šibenik-Knin	8	2.29%
Vukovar-Syrmia	7	2.00%
Sisak-Moslavina	6	1.71%
Karlovac	5	1.43%
Dubrovnik Neretva	3	0.86%
Požega-Slavonia	3	0.86%
Virovitica-Podravina	3	0.86%
Lika-Senj	2	1.57%
Krapina-Zagorje	1	0.29%
Međimurje	1	0.29%
Total	350	100%
(2011 census)

== Notable people ==
- Nikolaj Pešalov (b. 1970), weightlifter
- Marianna Radev (1913–1973), contralto
- Dubravka Ugrešić (1949–2023), writer, Bulgarian mother

== See also ==
- Bulgaria–Croatia relations
- Bulgarian diaspora
- Ethnic groups in Croatia
- Croats in Bulgaria
