= Austrians of Croatia =

Austrians of Croatia Austrijanci u Hrvatskoj
Total population
- 297

Languages
- German · Croatian

Religion
- Roman Catholicism

Related ethnic groups
- Austrians, Austrian diaspora

Austrians of Croatia are officially recognized as a minority in the Republic of Croatia, and therefore have their own permanent seat in the Croatian Parliament.

== History ==
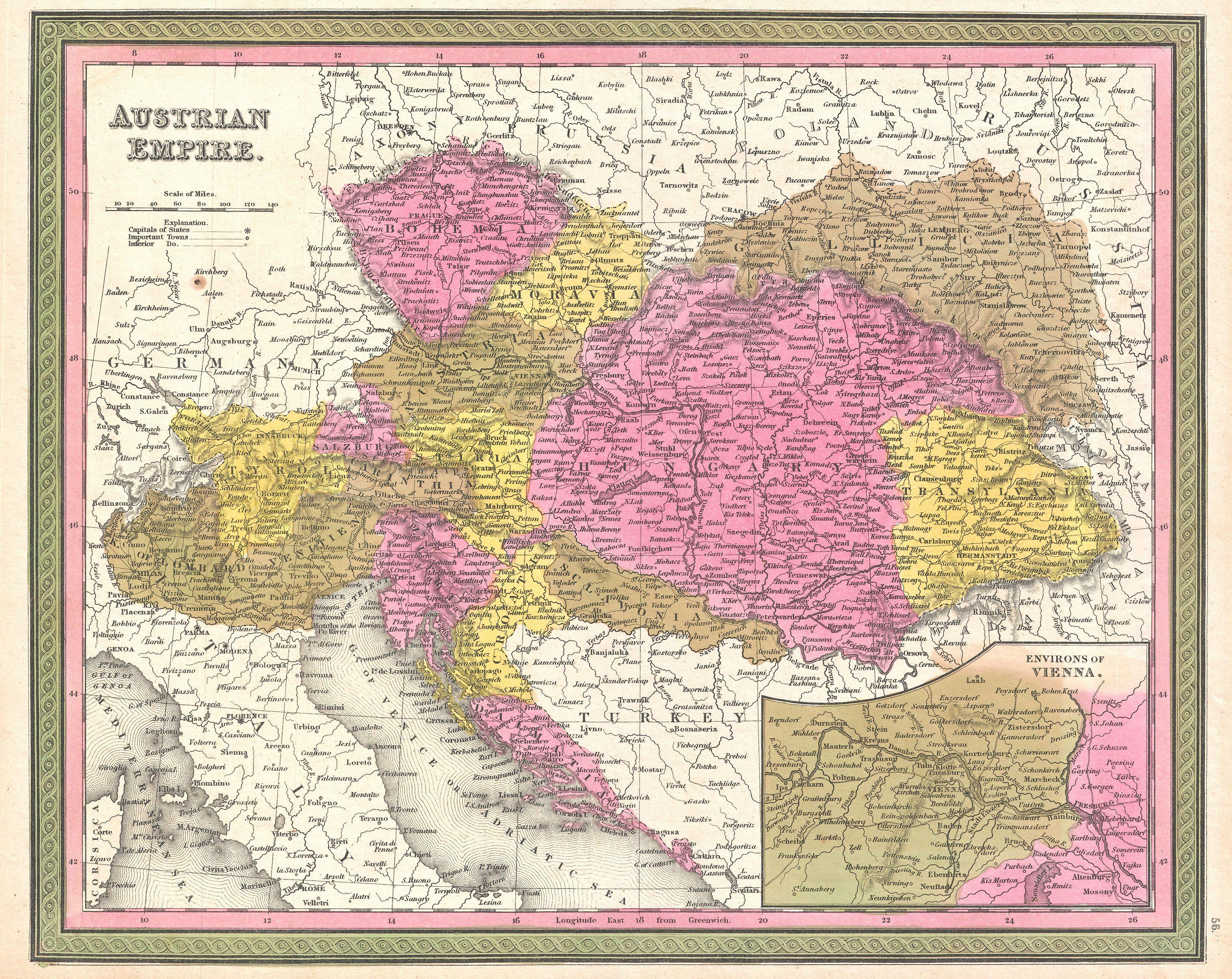
Austrian Empire in 1850

Austrians first began settling in Croatia as military personnel after the Croatian nobles met in Cetin to elect Ferdinand I, Archduke of Austria as their king, and in return the Habsburgs would defend Croatia from the Ottoman invasion. This led to the creation of the Military Frontier (Vojna Krajina, German Militaergrenze) within Croatian territory which would be ruled directly from Vienna's military headquarters. This led to an increase of Austrian and other settlers and military elite within the Military Frontier. In 1815, the Habsburgs finally secured possession of Dalmatia and Istria after the fall of Venice. In time the Austrian elite began flocking to the Adriatic for holiday and sunbathing. Towns such as Opatija gained reputations as health resorts and became populated by mainly Austrian season-goers.

== Geographic representation ==
According to the 2011 census, there are 297 people who consider themselves Austrians, with the largest group (35% of Croatia's ethnic Austrians) residing in Zagreb.

County	Number of Austrians	Percent of total
City of Zagreb	104	35.0%
Primorje-Gorski Kotar	36	12.1%
Istria	32	10.8%
Osijek-Baranja	23	7.7%
Split-Dalmatia	21	7.1%
Zadar	15	5.0%
Varaždinska	12	4.0%
Zagreb	11	3.7%
Međimurje	10	3.4%

== Notable individuals ==
- Gordon Schildenfeld, Croatian football player
- Diana Budisavljević, humanitarian

== See also ==
- Austria–Croatia relations
- Austrian diaspora
- Ethnic groups in Croatia
- Croats in Austria
