= Turks of Croatia =

Ethnic group in Croatia

Total population
- 404 (2021 census) est. 2,000

Regions with significant populations
- City of Zagreb: 134
- Primorje-Gorski Kotar County: 91
- Istria County: 50
- Split-Dalmatia County: 37
- Zadar County: 17

Languages
- Croatian; Turkish

Religion
- Sunni Islam

Turks of Croatia, also referred to as Turkish Croatians or Croatian Turks, (Croatian: Turci u Hrvatskoj; Turkish: Hırvatistan Türkleri) are one among 22 recognised national minorities in Croatia. According to the 2021 census, there were 404 Turks living in Croatia, most of which most lived in Primorje-Gorski Kotar County and later in the City of Zagreb. Only 368 native Turkish-language speakers live in that country.

Turks compose approximately 0.01% of the total population. The majority of Croatian Turks are Sunni Muslims, and make up 0.6% of Croatia's Muslim population (50,981 Muslims in total).

== History ==
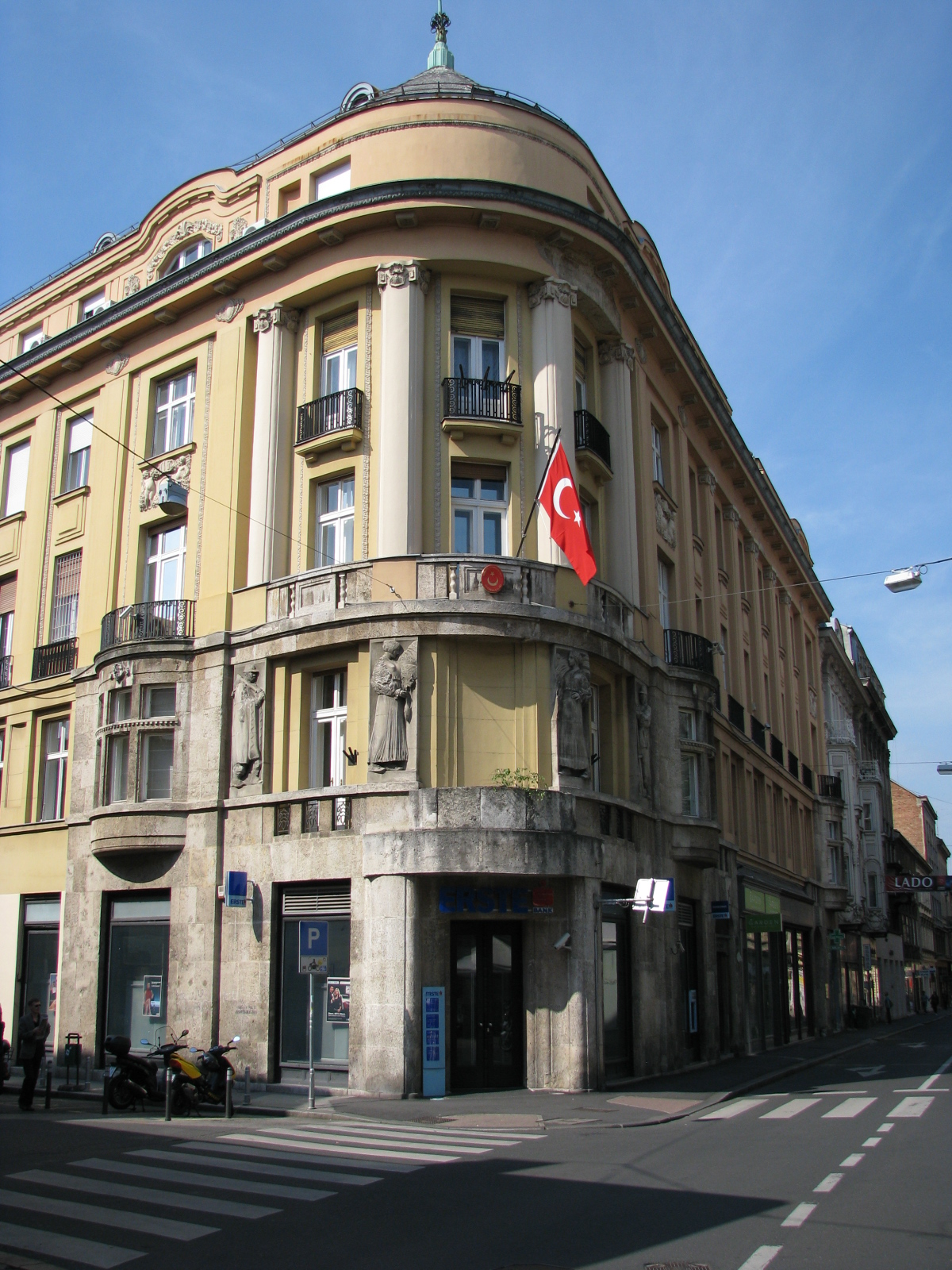
Turkish Embassy in Zagreb, Croatia

During the Croatian-Ottoman Wars of the 15th and 16th centuries, parts of Croatia were incorporated into the Ottoman Empire and settled by Turks. However, the majority of these retreated to other parts of Rumelia or Anatolia after the end of Ottoman rule. Many ethnic Turks in Croatia today are from more recent immigrations from the mid-20th century onwards.

== Culture ==
In the Independent State of Croatia, the Croatian Muslim Printing House issued a magazine in Turkish language intended for the Turkish public, the European turkologists and those in the Independent State of Croatia who spoke Turkish language. The magazine was called The East and the West: the Cultural, Economic, Social and Political Magazine (Turkish: Doğu ve Batı. Kültür, iktisat, sosyal ve siyasi mecmuası). It was issued between 6 April 1943 and 15 August 1944. It was the first magazine in Turkish language on the territory of the present-day Croatia and Bosnia and Herzegovina, and second on the territory of the former Yugoslavia.

== Population ==
Official name of Croatia	Year	Number of Turks
-	1931	186
PR Croatia	1948	13
PR Croatia	1953	276
PR Croatia	1961	2,710
SR Croatia	1971	221
SR Croatia	1981	279
Croatia	1991	320
Croatia	2001	300
Croatia	2011	367
Croatia	2021	404
(Croatian Bureau of Statistics)

== Notable people ==
- Banu Alkan, Turkish actress

== See also ==
- Croatia–Turkey relations
- Turkish minorities in the former Ottoman Empire
  - Turks in the Balkans
  - Turks in Bosnia and Herzegovina
  - Turks in Kosovo
  - Turks in Montenegro
  - Turks in North Macedonia
  - Turks in Serbia
