= Counties of Croatia =

First-level administrative division of Croatia

Counties of Croatia Hrvatske županije (Croatian)
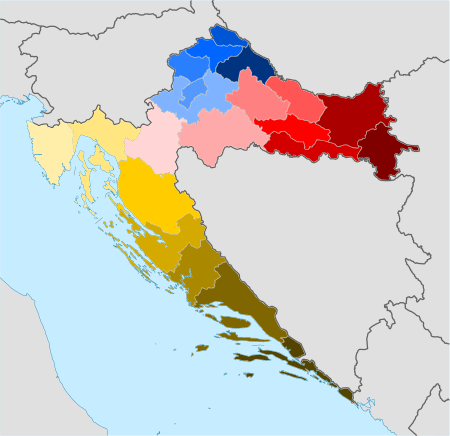
- Counties of Croatia: Bjelovar-Bilogora Brod-Posavina Dubrovnik-Neretva Istria Karlovac Koprivnica-Križevci Krapina-Zagorje Lika-Senj Međimurje Osijek-Baranja Požega-Slavonia Primorje-Gorski Kotar Šibenik-Knin Sisak-Moslavina Split-Dalmatia Varaždin Virovitica-Podravina Vukovar-Srijem Zadar City of Zagreb Zagreb County
- Category: Unitary state
- Location: Republic of Croatia
- Number: 20 counties plus the City of Zagreb
- Populations: 43,058 (Lika-Senj) – 774,225 (Zagreb)
- Areas: 640 km^{2} (247 sq mi) (Zagreb) – 5,350 km^{2} (2,067 sq mi) (Lika-Senj)
- Government: County government, National government
- Subdivisions: Municipality and City

The counties of Croatia (Croatian: hrvatske županije) are the first-level administrative subdivisions of the Republic of Croatia. Since they were re-established in 1992, Croatia has been divided into 20 counties and the capital city of Zagreb, which has the authority and legal status of both a county and a city (separate from the surrounding Zagreb County). As of 2015, the counties are subdivided into 128 cities and 428 (mostly rural) municipalities. The divisions have changed over time since the medieval Croatian state. They reflected territorial losses and expansions; changes in the political status of Dalmatia, Dubrovnik and Istria; and political circumstances, including the personal union and subsequent development of relations between the Kingdom of Croatia-Slavonia and the Kingdom of Hungary.

== Government ==
County assembly (županijska skupština) is a representative and deliberative body in each county. Assembly members are elected for a four-year term by popular vote (proportional system with closed lists and d'Hondt method) in local elections.

The executive branch of each county's government is headed by a county prefect (župan), except that a mayor heads the city of Zagreb's executive branch. Croatia's county prefects (with two deputy prefects), mayor of Zagreb (with two deputy mayors) (Note: Also city mayors and municipality presidents with deputies.) are elected for a four-year term by a majority of votes cast within applicable local government units, with a runoff election if no candidate achieves a majority in the first round of voting (majoritarian vote, two-round system). County prefects (with deputy prefects and mayor of Zagreb with his/her deputies) can be recalled by a referendum. County administrative bodies are administrative departments and services which are established for the performance of works in the self-governing domain of the county, as well as for the performance of works of state administration transferred to the county. Administrative departments and services are managed by heads (principals) nominated by the county prefect based on a public competition.

== Funding and tasks ==
The counties are funded by the central government, as well as by revenue generated by county-owned businesses, county taxes and county fees. The county taxes include a five per cent inheritance and gift tax, a motor vehicle tax, a vessel tax and an arcade game machine tax. The counties are tasked with performing general public administration services, primary and secondary education, government funded healthcare, social welfare, administration pertaining to agriculture, forestry, hunting, fisheries, mining, industry and construction, and other services to the economy at the county level, as well as road transport infrastructure management and issuing of building and location permits and other documents concerning construction in the county area excluding the area of the big city and the county seat city; the central government and local (city and municipal) governments may also perform each of those tasks at their respective levels according to the law. The Croatian County Association (Hrvatska zajednica županija) was established in 2003 as a framework for inter-county cooperation.

County spending accounts for 15 per cent of the total local-government spending in Croatia. The balance is spent by cities and municipalities. Approximately one half of the total spent by the counties is channeled into their primary fields of competence – secondary and vocational education, and financing of maintenance and running costs of healthcare and social welfare institutions. There are instances where individual counties also provide services otherwise delegated to lower-level self-government, such as primary education and spatial planning in cases where those units could not set up those services. The counties are criticized for inefficient spending. The criticism primarily stems from the fact that the counties receive the bulk of the funds needed for specific purposes from the central government budget and transfers them on. This contributes to the sense of absence of responsibility of the counties for the funds. In turn, that leads to very little or no incentive for improvements to spending efficiency or better collection of the county-level taxes. After year 2000, all those considerations have contributed to an ongoing debate in Croatia on the need of consolidation or abolition of the counties in political forums. Opinions on the matter differ considerably. They range from improving efficiency while retaining the existing counties, to consolidation to obtain nine counties, and abolition of the counties in favour of establishment of an administrative division of Croatia in five regions and potentially sub-regions.

== Lists of counties ==
=== Current ===
Counties of Croatia established in 1992
County	Seat	Regions	Statistical Regions	Area (2006)	Population (2021)	GDP per capita (2019)	Arms	Geographic coordinates
Bjelovar-Bilogora	Bjelovar	Central Croatia	Pannonian Croatia	2,640 km^{2} (1,020 sq mi)	101,879	€9,132	Coat of arms of Bjelovar-Bilogora County	45°54′10″N 16°50′51″E
Brod-Posavina	Slavonski Brod	Slavonia	Pannonian Croatia	2,030 km^{2} (780 sq mi)	130,267	€8,211	Coat of arms of Brod-Posavina County	45°09′27″N 18°01′13″E
Dubrovnik-Neretva	Dubrovnik	Dalmatia	Adriatic Croatia	1,781 km^{2} (688 sq mi)	115,564	€14,673	Coat of arms of Dubrovnik-Neretva County	42°39′13″N 18°05′41″E
Istria	Pazin	Istria	Adriatic Croatia	2,813 km^{2} (1,086 sq mi)	195,237	€15,960	Coat of arms of Istria County	45°14′21″N 13°56′19″E
Karlovac	Karlovac	Central Croatia	Pannonian Croatia	3,626 km^{2} (1,400 sq mi)	112,195	€9,510	Coat of arms of Karlovac County	45°29′35″N 15°33′21″E
Koprivnica-Križevci	Koprivnica	Central Croatia	Northern Croatia	1,748 km^{2} (675 sq mi)	101,221	€10,110	Coat of arms of Koprivnica-Križevci County	46°10′12″N 16°54′33″E
Krapina-Zagorje	Krapina	Central Croatia	Northern Croatia	1,229 km^{2} (475 sq mi)	120,702	€8,954	Coat of arms of Krapina-Zagorje County	46°7′30″N 15°48′25″E
Lika-Senj	Gospić	Central Croatia	Adriatic Croatia	5,353 km^{2} (2,067 sq mi)	42,748	€10,725	Coat of arms of Lika-Senj County	44°42′25″N 15°10′27″E
Međimurje	Čakovec	Central Croatia	Northern Croatia	729 km^{2} (281 sq mi)	105,250	€11,476	Coat of arms of Međimurje County	46°27′58″N 16°24′50″E
Osijek-Baranja	Osijek	Slavonia	Pannonian Croatia	4,155 km^{2} (1,604 sq mi)	258,026	€10,232	Coat of arms of Osijek-Baranja County	45°38′13″N 18°37′5″E
Požega-Slavonia	Požega	Slavonia	Pannonian Croatia	1,823 km^{2} (704 sq mi)	64,084	€8,217	Coat of arms of Požega-Slavonia County	45°18′40″N 17°44′24″E
Primorje-Gorski Kotar	Rijeka	Central Croatia	Adriatic Croatia	3,588 km^{2} (1,385 sq mi)	265,419	€15,232	Coat of arms of Primorje-Gorski Kotar County	45°27′14″N 14°35′38″E
Sisak-Moslavina	Sisak	Central Croatia	Pannonian Croatia	4,468 km^{2} (1,725 sq mi)	139,603	€9,706	Coat of arms of Sisak-Moslavina County	45°13′15″N 16°15′5″E
Split-Dalmatia	Split	Dalmatia	Adriatic Croatia	4,540 km^{2} (1,750 sq mi)	423,407	€10,759	Coat of arms of Split-Dalmatia County	43°10′0″N 16°30′0″E
Šibenik-Knin	Šibenik	Dalmatia	Adriatic Croatia	2,984 km^{2} (1,152 sq mi)	96,381	€11,325	Coat of arms of Šibenik-Knin County	43°55′44″N 16°3′43″E
Varaždin	Varaždin	Central Croatia	Northern Croatia	1,262 km^{2} (487 sq mi)	159,487	€12,112	Post-1992 coat of arms of Varaždin County	46°19′16″N 16°13′52″E
Virovitica-Podravina	Virovitica	Slavonia	Pannonian Croatia	2,024 km^{2} (781 sq mi)	70,368	€7,869	Coat of arms of Virovitica-Podravina County	45°52′23″N 17°30′18″E
Vukovar-Srijem	Vukovar	Slavonia	Pannonian Croatia	2,454 km^{2} (947 sq mi)	143,113	€8,606	Coat of arms of Vukovar-Srijem County	45°13′43″N 18°55′0″E
Zadar	Zadar	Central Croatia (Through Gračac) and Dalmatia	Adriatic Croatia	3,646 km^{2} (1,408 sq mi)	159,766	€11,544	Coat of arms of Zadar County	44°1′5″N 15°53′42″E
Zagreb	Zagreb	Central Croatia	Northern Croatia	3,060 km^{2} (1,180 sq mi)	299,985	€10,769	Post-1992 coat of arms of Zagreb County	45°44′56″N 15°34′16″E
City of Zagreb (Note: The city of Zagreb acts as both a county and a city, and is not part of any other county—Zagreb County is a separate administrative unit encompassing territory outside the city of Zagreb.)	Zagreb	Central Croatia	City of Zagreb	641 km^{2} (247 sq mi)	767,131	€23,742	Coat of arms of the city of Zagreb	45°49′0″N 15°59′0″E

== History ==
=== Middle Ages ===
Approximate positions of the first counties of 10th century Croatia, overlaid on a map of modern Croatia and Bosnia-Herzegovina

Medieval Croatia under the House of Trpimirović was territorially organised for purposes of administration into areas named župa. Each župa was governed either by the king directly or his representative for the territory. The title given to such representatives was župan. Gradually, the term župa was replaced in practice with županija – meaning "the territory governed by a župan. Since the 12th century, the counties have also been referred to by the Latin term comitatus. Since the 20th century, English-language sources use the term county to refer to županija.

The number of counties, their extent and authority have varied significantly, reflecting: changes in the relative levels of power wielded by kings and nobility; territorial changes in the course of the Croatian–Ottoman Wars; and societal and political changes through several centuries. Sources disagree on the number of counties in the medieval Croatian state. The situation is further complicated by existence of nobility-owned lands enjoying special statuses. Historians Ivan Beuc and Josip Vrbošić note that the following eleven counties are normally listed as the oldest known:

- Livno (encompassing the Livanjsko polje)
- Cetina (centered on the Cetina river, with its seat in Stolac)
- Imotski (south of Livno County and north of the Biokovo Mountain, seat in Imotski)
- Pliva (around the Pliva and Vrbas rivers)
- Pset or Pesenta (between the Una and Unac in the West, and Sana in the East)
- Primorje or Klis (along the Adriatic's coast between Šibenik and Omiš, with its seat in the Klis Fortress)
- Bribir (to the west of Primorje County, with the seat in the Bribir Fortress)
- Nin (around Nin as the seat of the county, and Zadar)
- Knin (with its seat in the Knin Fortress)
- Sidraga (in the area between Bribir County and Zadar, likely with seat in Biograd)
- Nona, later renamed Luka (between Knin, Nin, Sidraga and Bribir counties)

In addition to the above, other sources like historian Neven Budak list further three 10th-century counties located to the northwest of the territory encompassed by the eleven counties centered around Gacka, Krbava and Lika – and named after those toponyms. There are indications that there were further contemporary counties in Lower Pannonia north of Gvozd Mountain (referred to as the Pannonian Croatia in some sources) in the same period. However, their existence is poorly documented. The prevailing opinion in Croatian historiography is that the Pannonian counties were directly subject to the ruler of the Croatian state, while the counties in the south were largely hereditary, controlled by nobility. In the area between the Kvarner Gulf of the Adriatic Sea, the Mala Kapela mountain, and the rivers of Kupa and Korana, there was the Modruš County in existence in the late 11th century.

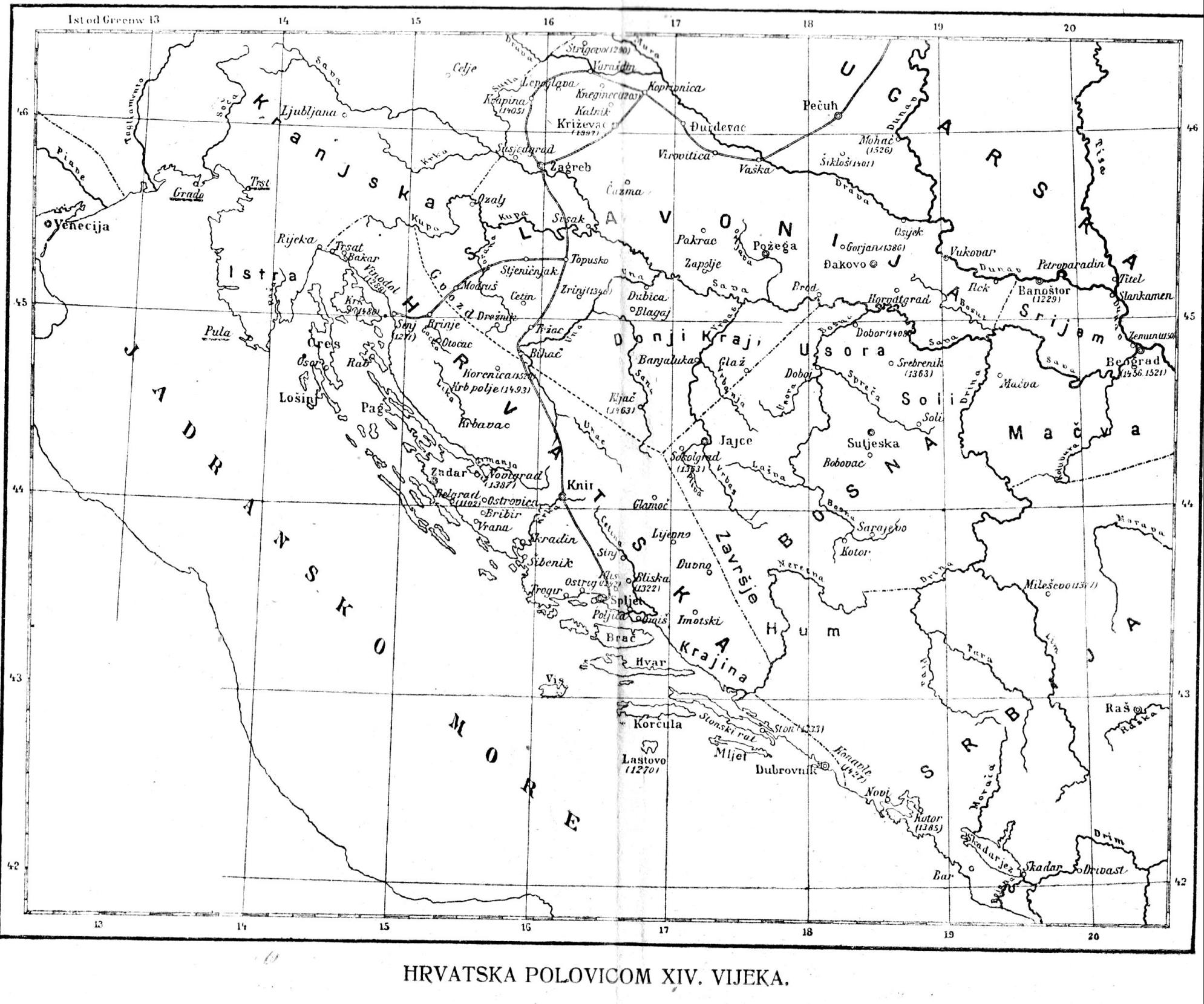
Map of Croatia in personal union with Hungary in mid-14th century according to historian Ferdo Šišić

The earliest recorded counties in the area between Sava and Drava rivers date back to the 12th century. Those counties are identified as the Zagreb, Varaždin, Virovitica, and Križevci counties – with the Križevci County reported as the largest of them all. At the same time, Vrbas, Sana and Dubica counties were established to the south of the Sava River (in areas around Vrbas, Sana and the Dubica Fortress near present-day Dubica respectively) as territories administered by royal appointees on behalf of the king. Another county established south of Sava in the same period was the Glaž County. Just as the Vrbas, Sana, and Dubica counties, sources locate the Glaž County to the northwestern Bosnia, but disagree on its location, placing it around the Ukrina river or, like historian Pál Engel, equating its seat Glaž with the city of Banja Luka. Engel further noted that Tvrtko I of Bosnia may have surrendered the seat of the county to Hungarian rule by a treaty of 1357. Under the treaty, a part of Hum lands was ceded as dowry of Elizabeth of Bosnia. In the 13th century, the Požega and Vuka counties were established in the area of the modern-day Slavonia to the east of Virovitica and Križevci counties. The Požega, Vuka, Virovitica and Križevci counties were also referred to as the south-Hungarian counties.

In the 13th and 14th century, the Croatian nobility grew stronger and the counties defined by the king were reduced to a formal framework, while military and financial power was wielded by the nobility and especially the king. Other forms of administration that overlapped with county administration in this period included the Roman Catholic Church and the free royal cities, and separately the cities of Dalmatia. In such circumstances, the nobility had little incentive to perform county duties and often appointed deputies to preside over county court proceedings hearing matters of little importance once every two weeks – as all major issues were normally delegated by royal exemptions to be ruled upon on a case-by-case basis. This further diminished significance of the counties. Modruš County ceased to exist as an administrative unit as it was broken up into multiple feudal estates. Vuka, Požega and Virovitica counties were lost to the Ottoman conquest. The Vuka County became defunct in the early 16th century, Požega was conquered in 1537, and Virovitica in 1552. The Vrbas, Sana and Dubica counties also existed until the Ottoman conquest, while Glaž was last mentioned in preserved historical records in 1469.

=== Habsburg era ===
At the time of 1527 election in Cetin and the start of rule of the House of Habsburg, only three counties remained due to territorial losses to the Ottoman Empire – Zagreb, Varaždin, and Križevci counties. The gradual decline of importance of the counties, already present before the Habsburg era, continued as the Ottoman threat increased. Following the Ottoman defeat in the Great Turkish War and the subsequent 1699 Treaty of Karlowitz, as well as the Ottoman defeat in the 1716–1718 Austro-Turkish War, the territories organised in counties were expanded in 1745. The territorial expansion was accompanied by an expansion of county prerogatives: The head of the county – supremus comes (veliki župan) – was authorised to govern in a range administrative, judicial and military affairs in the name of the king. Males of legal age residing in the county whose family originates from the county were eligible to be appointed the supremus comes. His duties were discharged through two deputies for judiciary and administration respectively, judges, as well as other professionals such as lawyers, physicians, engineers, tax collectors, etc. This expansion saw establishment of the Virovitica, Požega, and Syrmia counties. In 1778, the Severin County was established south of Zagreb, extending to the Adriatic Sea. In 1786, the Severin County was abolished. Its coastal areas extending from Fiume (modern-day Rijeka) to Senj to form the Hungarian Littoral, while the remainder was added to the Zagreb County.

In the 1850s, during the period of Bach's absolutism that followed the revolutions in the Austrian Empire Križevci and Syrmia counties were abolished and their territories added to neighbouring counties and to the Serbian Vojvodina respectively. At the same time, the Rijeka County was established in the territories previously included in the Hungarian Littoral – bringing the total number of counties to five. Virtually all these changes were reversed by the 1868 Croatian–Hungarian Settlement. However, the Hungarian Littoral was abolished and the legal Corups separatum was carved out of Fiume and its immediate surroundings to be ruled directly by Hungary, while the remainder of the Rijeka County (also referred to as the Croatian Littoral) was a part of the Kingdom of Croatia-Slavonia – itself a product of merger of Croatia and Slavonia, consisting of seven counties after the settlement.

In 1871, the Varaždin Generalate of the Croatian Military Frontier was abolished by the central authorities of the recently established Austria-Hungary and the bulk of the Bjelovar County spanning the territory previously under military control between the kingdoms of Croatia and Slavonia and including the cities of Bjelovar (as the county capital) and Ivanić Grad. A small part of the former Varaždin Generalate (the town of Kutina) was added to the Požega County. At the same time, the military part of Sisak was transferred to the civilian rule and added to the Zagreb County, while the Rijeka County received demilitarised Senj.

Population of the counties of the kingdoms of Croatia and Slavonia in 1773–1871
County	Seat	Population (1773)	Population (1785–87)	Population (1802)	Population (1871)
Križevci	Križevci	53,523	66,493	61,566	87,878
Požega	Požega	54,108	66,161	66,987	76,881
Syrmia	Vukovar	63,532	81,886	89,721	120,559
Varaždin	Varaždin	56,969	90,916	102,616	173,088
Virovitica	Osijek	92,852	116,578	129,641	185,352
Zagreb	Zagreb	182,071	187,106	188,343	267,720
Littoral (Note: Not a county specifically; Comprises the city of Fiume (modern-day Rijeka) included in the Corpus Separatum directly governed by the Kingdom of Hungary, the city of Bakar and further territories of the former Severin County outside the Corpus Separatum not transferred to the Zagreb County, but governed as a part of the Kingdom of Croatia.)/Rijeka	Rijeka	–	27,951	28,156	90,070
Bjelovar	Bjelovar	–	–	–	158,007

=== Abolition of the Military Frontier ===
In 1873, the remainder of the Croatian and Slavonian Military Frontiers was demilitarised and transferred to the civil authority. Ban Ivan Mažuranić organised the thus acquired territory by establishing six districts. Area of responsibility of each of the three Slavonian Military Frontier regiments was made a district. Elsewhere, two regimental areas of responsibility were combined to form a new district each. All the districts were named after the town hosting the regimental headquarters, except the district formed in First and the Second Ban's regiments' areas of responsibility which became the Ban's District (Banski okrug, also referred to as Banovina). Territories of the existing eight counties were reorganised internally in 1875. Districts were abolished as their subdivisions and each county was divided into two to four sub-counties (podžupanija). There were also some changes to the borders of the counties. The most significant was transfer of a portion of the Bjelovar County to the Križevci County.

In 1886, new legislation on the territories of the counties. Rijeka, Bjelovar, and Križevci counties were abolished, but the Lika-Krbava, Bjelovar-Križevci, and Modruš-Rijeka counties were established. Five of the eight counties kept their existing names, but most of them were expanded to encompass (together with the newly established counties) the former districts previously established in place of the Military Frontier. The sub-counties were abolished, and subdivisions of the counties into districts and administrative municipalities was introduced. This arrangement remained in effect until the Croatian counties were abolished in 1922, while some minor adjustments of county boundaries happened in 1913. Through 1886 reform, the counties were set up as self-governmental units in contrast to earlier county incarnations since the Middle Ages. Each had an assembly with the wealthiest taxpayers comprising half the assembly members and elected members comprising the remaining half. One assembly member was meant to represent 2000 county residents. The assemblies appointed administrative committees as their executive bodies The supremus comes was appointed by the king and county officials by the Ban. Administration of each county had six members elected by the county assembly, while the remaining members were county officials ex officio (supremus comes and deputies, county health supervisor etc.). Counties were divided into districts (Croatian kotari as government units similar to Austrian Bezirke), while municipalities (općine) and cities (gradovi) were units of local self-government. In the 1870 reform following the Croatian–Hungarian Settlement, powers of the counties were transformed. They became less independent from the central government in determination of local government policies.

Sub-counties introduced by the 1875 reform
County	Seat	Area	Sub-counties
Bjelovar	Bjelovar	3,475 km^{2} (1,342 sq mi)	Bjelovar, Križ
Križevci	Križevci	2,163 km^{2} (835 sq mi)	Križevci, Koprivnica
Požega	Požega	2,379 km^{2} (919 sq mi)	Požega, Pakrac
Rijeka	Ogulin	1,601 km^{2} (618 sq mi)	Rijeka, Delnice
Syrmia	Vukovar	2,476 km^{2} (956 sq mi)	Vukovar, Ruma
Varaždin	Varaždin	2,322 km^{2} (897 sq mi)	Varaždin, Zlatar, Krapina-Toplice
Virovitica	Osijek	4,781 km^{2} (1,846 sq mi)	Osijek, Virovitica, Đakovo
Zagreb	Zagreb	4,076 km^{2} (1,574 sq mi)	Zagreb, Karlovac, Sisak, Jastrebarsko

Counties of the Kingdom of Croatia-Slavonia, and location of the kingdom within Austria-Hungary (inset, orange)

Size and population of the counties of Croatia-Slavonia after the 1886 reform
County	Seat	Area (1886–1912)	Population (1910)	Arms	Geographic coordinates
Bjelovar-Križevci	Bjelovar	5,048 km^{2} (1,949 sq mi)	331,385	Coat of arms of Bjelovar-Križevci County	45°55′14″N 16°45′54″E
Lika-Krbava	Gospić	6,217 km^{2} (2,400 sq mi)	203,973	Coat of arms of Lika-Krbava County	44°42′28″N 15°21′12″E
Modruš-Rijeka	Ogulin	4,874 km^{2} (1,882 sq mi)	231,354		45°19′30″N 14°58′28″E
Požega	Požega	4,938 km^{2} (1,907 sq mi)	263,690	Coat of arms of Požega County	45°22′45″N 17°31′4″E
Syrmia	Vukovar	6,848 km^{2} (2,644 sq mi)	410,007	Coat of arms of Syrmia County	45°4′53″N 19°15′33″E
Varaždin	Varaždin	2,521 km^{2} (973 sq mi)	305,558	Pre-1922 coat of arms of Varaždin County	46°15′7″N 16°11′38″E
Virovitica	Osijek	4,852 km^{2} (1,873 sq mi)	269,199	Coat of arms of Virovitica County	45°38′27″N 17°51′30″E
Zagreb	Zagreb	7,215 km^{2} (2,786 sq mi)	587,378	Pre-1922 coat of arms of Zagreb County	45°38′27″N 16°11′57″E

Defunct counties of Croatia
County	Period of existence
Livno	From c. 10th century until an undetermined time. Defunct by the 16th century.
Cetina	From c. 10th century until an undetermined time. Defunct by the 16th century.
Imotski	From c. 10th century until an undetermined time. Defunct by the 16th century.
Pliva	From c. 10th century until an undetermined time. Defunct by the 16th century.
Pset/Pesenta	From c. 10th century until an undetermined time. Defunct by the 16th century.
Primorje/Klis	From c. 10th century until an undetermined time. Defunct by the 16th century.
Bribir	From c. 10th century until an undetermined time. Defunct by the 16th century.
Nona	From c. 10th century until an undetermined time. Defunct by the 16th century.
Knin	From c. 10th century until an undetermined time. Defunct by the 16th century.
Sidraga	From c. 10th century until an undetermined time. Defunct by the 16th century.
Nina/Luka	From c. 10th century until an undetermined time. Defunct by the 16th century.
Gacka	From c. 10th century until an undetermined time. Defunct by the 16th century.
Krbava	From c. 10th century until an undetermined time. Defunct by the 16th century.
Lika	From c. 10th century until an undetermined time. Defunct by the 16th century.
Modruš	11th – 13th/14th century
Vrbas	From c. 12th century until an undetermined time. Defunct by the 16th century.
Sana	From c. 12th century until an undetermined time. Defunct by the 16th century.
Dubica	From c. 12th century until an undetermined time. Defunct by the 16th century.
Glaž	From c. 12th century until an undetermined time. Defunct by the 16th century.
Zagreb	12th century – 1922
Varaždin	12th century – 1922
Križevci	12th century – 1886
Vuka	13th – 16th century
Virovitica	13th – 16th century; 1745 – 1922
Požega	13th – 16th century; 1745 – 1922
Syrmia	1745 – 1848; 1868 – 1922
Severin	1778 – 1786
Rijeka	1851 – 1886
Bjelovar	1871 – 1886
Bjelovar-Križevci	1886 – 1922
Lika-Krbava	1886 – 1922
Modruš-Rijeka	1886 – 1922
In 1922, all counties in existence at the time were abolished.

=== Modernity ===
The traditional division of Croatia into counties was abolished in 1922, when the oblasts of the Kingdom of Serbs, Croats and Slovenes were introduced; these were later replaced by the banovinas of Yugoslavia. Socialist Republic of Croatia, as a constituent part of post-World War II Yugoslavia had approximately 100 municipalities as main governmental units and local government entities. The counties were reintroduced in 1992, but with significant territorial alterations from the pre-1922 subdivisions; for instance, before 1922 Transleithanian Croatia was divided into eight counties, but the new legislation established fourteen counties in the same territory. Međimurje County was established in the eponymous region acquired through the 1920 Treaty of Trianon. The county borders have sometimes changed since their 1992 restoration (for reasons such as historical ties and requests by cities); the latest revision took place in 2006. After the end of the Croatian War of Independence and during the UNTAES process in eastern Croatia, local Serb population and representatives unsuccessfully proposed various initiatives to preserve the former rebel region as one territorial unit within Croatia, including the proposal to create a new "Serb county" in the region. Present-day counties correspond to the 2021 classification of tier three of the European Union NUTS statistical regions of Croatia.

== See also ==
- Administrative divisions of Croatia
- Flags of the counties of Croatia
- List of county prefects of Croatia
- List of Croatian counties by Human Development Index
- History of Croatia
- Administrative divisions of the Banovina of Croatia
- Counties of the Independent State of Croatia
- ISO 3166-2:HR

== Sources ==
- Babić, Nikica (2011). "Srpska oblast Istočna Slavonija, Baranja i Zapadni Srijem – od "Oluje" do dovršetka mirne reintegracije hrvatskog Podunavlja (prvi dio)" [The Serb District of Eastern Slavonia, Baranja and Western Syrmia - From the Croatian Operation "Storm" to the Completion of the Peaceful Reintegration of the Croatian Danube Region (part one)]. Scrina Slavonia (in Croatian). 11 (1). Slavonski Brod: 393–454. ISSN 1332-4853. Archived from the original on 29 September 2021.
- Bajo, Anto; Bronić, Mihaela (2004). "Fiskalna decentralizacija u Hrvatskoj: problemi fiskalnog izravnanja" [Fiscal Decentralisation in Croatia: Problems of Fiscal Equalisation]. Financijska Teorija I Praksa (in Croatian). 28 (4). Zagreb: Institut za javne financije: 445–467. ISSN 1332-3970. Archived from the original on 15 November 2022.
- Bejaković, Predrag (2016). "Treba li očuvati postojeće županije u Hrvatskoj?" [Should the Existing Counties of Croatia be Preserved?]. Političke analize: Tromjesečnik za hrvatsku i međunarodnu politiku (in Croatian). 7 (26). Zagreb: Croatian Politological Society: 18–25. ISSN 1847-4977. Archived from the original on 17 November 2022.
- Biondich, Mark (2000). Stjepan Radić, the Croat Peasant Party, and the politics of mass mobilization, 1904–1928. Toronto: University of Toronto Press. ISBN 9780802082947. Archived from the original on 12 April 2024.
- Budak, Neven (2018). Hrvatska povijest od 550. do 1100 [Croatian history from 550 to 1100] (in Croatian). Zagreb: Leykam international. ISBN 978-953-340-061-7. Archived from the original on 3 October 2022.
- "Croatian County Association - Home". Croatian County Association. Archived from the original on 3 January 2019.
- Čajkušić, Suzana; Pipp, Patrik; Omerzo, Ingrid (14 February 2022). "Bruto domaći proizvod za Republiku Hrvatsku, HR NUTS 2 i županije u 2019" [Gross domestic product for the Republic of Croatia, HR NUTS 2 and counties in 2019]. Priopćenje Državnog zavoda za statistiku Republike Hrvatske (in Croatian). LIX (2022–2–1). Croatian Bureau of Statistics. ISSN 1334-0557. Archived from the original on 5 July 2022.
- Ćošković, Pejo (1998). "Elizabeta". Croatian Biographical Lexicon (in Croatian). Miroslav Krleža Institute of Lexicography. Archived from the original on 21 November 2022.
- Dubravica, Branko (2001). "Političko-teritorijalna podjela i opseg civilne Hrvatske u godinama sjedinjenja s vojnom Hrvatskom 1871–1886" [Political and territorial division and scope of civilian Croatia in the period of unification with the Croatian military frontier 1871–1886]. Politička Misao (in Croatian). 38 (3). Zagreb: University of Zagreb, Faculty of Political Sciences: 159–172. ISSN 0032-3241. Archived from the original on 4 July 2016.
- Engel, Pál (1998). "Neki problemi bosansko-ugarskih odnosa" [Some Problems of Bosnian-Hungarian Relationships in the Middle Ages]. Zbornik Odsjeka za povijesne znanosti Zavoda za povijesne i društvene znanosti Hrvatske akademije znanosti i umjetnosti (in Croatian). 16. Zagreb: Croatian Academy of Sciences and Arts: 57–72. ISSN 1330-7134. Archived from the original on 21 November 2022.
- Engel, Pál (1999). Ayton, Andrew (ed.). The realm of St. Stephen: a history of medieval Hungary, 895–1526 Volume 19 of International Library of Historical Studies. Penn State Press. ISBN 0-271-01758-9.
- Font, Márta (2005). "Ugarsko Kraljevstvo i Hrvatska u srednjem vijeku" [Hungarian Kingdom and Croatia in the Middle Ages]. Povijesni prilozi (in Croatian). 24 (28). Zagreb: Croatian Institute of History: 7–22. ISSN 0351-9767. Archived from the original on 16 November 2022.
- Frucht, Richard C. (2005). Eastern Europe: An Introduction to the People, Lands, and Culture. Santa Barbara: ABC-Clio. ISBN 9781576078006. Archived from the original on 21 January 2023.
- "Glaž". Croatian Encyclopedia, on-line edition (in Croatian). Miroslav Krleža Institute of Lexicography. Archived from the original on 21 November 2022.
- Goldstein, Ivo (1996). Hrvatske županije kroz stoljeća [Croatian Counties Through the Centuries] (in Croatian). Zagreb: Školska knjiga. ISBN 9789530613676.
- "Gospodarski profil Grada Zagreba i Zagrebačke županije" [Economic profile of the City of Zagreb and the Zagreb County] (in Croatian). Croatian Chamber of Economy. Archived from the original on 7 May 2006.
- Kolar-Dimitrijević, Mira (1991). "Utjecaj Prvog svjetskog rata na kretanje stanovništva i stočarstva na području Hrvatske i Slavonije" [Impact of World War I on population and animal husbandry trends in the area of Croatia and Slavonia]. Radovi Zavoda Za Hrvatsku Povijest (in Croatian). 24 (1). Zagreb: University of Zagreb, Croatian History Institute: 41–56. ISSN 0353-295X. Archived from the original on 3 January 2019.
- Korunić, Petar (2013). "Stanovništvo Hrvatske 1802. godine" [The Population of Croatia in 1802]. Historijski zbornik (in Croatian). 66 (1). Zagreb: Društvo za hrvatsku povjesnicu: 47–99. ISSN 0351-2193. Archived from the original on 16 November 2022.
- Mujadžević, Dino (2009). "Osmanska osvajanja u Slavoniji 1552. u svjetlu osmanskih arhivskih izvora" [The 1552 Ottoman Invasions in Slavonia According to the Ottoman Archival Sources]. Povijesni prilozi (in Croatian). 28 (36). Zagreb: Croatian Institute of History: 89–107. ISSN 0351-9767.
- "Nacionalna klasifikacija statističkih regija 2021 (HR_NUTS 2021.)" [National Classification of Statistical Regions 2021 (HR_NUTS 2021)]. Narodne novine (in Croatian) (125). Republic of Croatia. 2019. ISSN 0027-7932. Archived from the original on 16 November 2022.
- Nadilo, Branko (2002). "Neistražene ruševine modruške utvrde i naselja" [Unexplored Ruins of the Fortress and Town of Modruš] (PDF). Građevinar (in Croatian). 54 (8). Zagreb: Croatian Association of Civil Engineers: 499–505. doi:10.14256/JCE. ISSN 0350-2465. Archived (PDF) from the original on 21 November 2022.
- "Objavljeni konačni rezultati Popisa 2021" [Final Results of the 2021 Census Published] (in Croatian). Croatian Bureau of Statistics. 22 September 2022. Archived from the original on 1 June 2023.
- Petković, Danijel (2006). "Hrvatsko ime u srednjovjekovnoj Slavoniji prema nekoliko primjera u diplomatičkim izvorima od 13. do 15. stoljeća" [Croatian Name in Medieval Slavonia According to Several Examples in Diplomatic Sources from the 13th to the 15th Century]. Starohrvatska Prosvjeta (in Croatian). 3 (33). Split: Museum of Croatian Archaeological Monuments: 243–281. ISSN 0351-4536. Archived from the original on 16 November 2022.
- Radman, Zoran (2016). "Reforma lokalne samouprave: mogući smjerovi" [Local Self-Government Reform: Possible Directions]. Političke analize: Tromjesečnik za hrvatsku i međunarodnu politiku (in Croatian). 7 (26). Zagreb: Croatian Politological Society: 26–31. ISSN 1847-4977. Archived from the original on 17 November 2022.
- Skenderović, Robert (2010). "Popis stanovništva hrvatskih i slavonskih županija iz 1773. godine ("Tabella Impopulationis pro Anno 1773")" [The 1773 Census Of Croatian And Slavonian Counties]. Povijesni prilozi (in Croatian). 29 (39). Zagreb: Croatian Institute of History: 73–92. ISSN 0351-9767. Archived from the original on 16 November 2022.
- Slukan-Altić, Mirela (2007). "Razvoj i prostorna organizacija srednjovjekovne Kostajnice" [The Development and Spatial Organisation of Medieval Kostajnica]. Zbornik Odsjeka za povijesne znanosti Zavoda za povijesne i društvene znanosti Hrvatske akademije znanosti i umjetnosti (in Croatian). 25. Zagreb: Croatian Academy of Sciences and Arts: 1–23. ISSN 1330-7134. Archived from the original on 21 November 2022.
- "The Constitution of the Republic of Croatia (consolidated text)". Croatian Parliament. Archived from the original on 15 November 2022.
- "The Croatian tax system". Croatian Tax Administration. Archived from the original on 15 June 2012.
- "Popovača dobila status grada" [Popovača Receives City Status]. Poslovni dnevnik (in Croatian). HINA. 12 April 2013. Archived from the original on 21 February 2014.
- Vlašić, Anđelko (2016). "Iskorištavanje šuma u Slavoniji u osmanskom razdoblju (1526.–1691.)" [The Exploitation of Forests in Slavonia During the Ottoman Period (1526–1691)]. Scrina Slavonia (in Croatian). 16 (1). Slavonski Brod: 71–90. ISSN 1332-4853. Archived from the original on 17 November 2022.
- Vrbošić, Josip (1992). "Povijesni pregled razvitka županijske uprave i samouprave u Hrvatskoj" [Historical Survey of the Development of the County Government and Autonomy in Croatia]. Društvena istraživanja: časopis za opća društvena pitanja (in Croatian). 1 (1). Zagreb: Institute for Social Sciences Ivo Pilar: 55–68. ISSN 1330-0288. Archived from the original on 15 November 2022.
- "Vukovska županija" [Vuka County]. Croatian Encyclopedia, on-line edition (in Croatian). Miroslav Krleža Institute of Lexicography. Archived from the original on 17 November 2022.
- "Zakon o lokalnim izborima" [Local Elections Act]. Narodne novine (in Croatian) (144). Zagreb: Republic of Croatia. 2012. ISSN 0027-7932. Archived from the original on 4 November 2016.
- "Zakon o lokalnoj i područnoj (regionalnoj) samoupravi (pročišćeni tekst)" [Local and Regionsal Self-Government Act (Consolidated Text)]. Narodne novine (in Croatian) (19). Zagreb: Republic of Croatia. 2013. ISSN 0027-7932. Archived from the original on 28 September 2016.
- "Zakon o područjima županija, gradova i općina u Republici Hrvatskoj" [Territories of Counties, Cities and Municipalities of the Republic of Croatia Act]. Narodne novine (in Croatian) (90). Republic of Croatia. 1992. ISSN 0027-7932. Archived from the original on 28 August 2013.
- "Zakon o područjima županija, gradova i općina u Republici Hrvatskoj" [Territories of Counties, Cities and Municipalities of the Republic of Croatia Act]. Narodne novine (in Croatian) (10). Republic of Croatia. 1997. ISSN 0027-7932. Archived from the original on 12 June 2018.
- "Zakon o područjima županija, gradova i općina u Republici Hrvatskoj" [Territories of Counties, Cities and Municipalities of the Republic of Croatia Act]. Narodne novine (in Croatian) (86). Republic of Croatia. 2006. ISSN 0027-7932. Archived from the original on 4 March 2016.
- "županija" [County]. Croatian Encyclopedia, on-line edition (in Croatian). Miroslav Krleža Institute of Lexicography. Archived from the original on 15 November 2022.
- "Županije – velike gospodarske razlike na malom prostoru" [Counties – Great Economic Differences in a Small Space] (PDF) (PDF) (in Croatian). Croatian Chamber of Economy. 2016. Archived (PDF) from the original on 16 November 2022.
