= List of acts of the 11th Sabor =

Laws passed by 2024-2028 session of the Croatian Parliament

This is a list of laws enacted by the 11th Croatian Sabor, which began on May 16, 2024.

== List ==
NN edition	Date of enactment	Official title	Official title in Croatian	Full text
57/2024	May 16, 2024	Amendments to the Act on the Organization and Scope of Work of State Administration Bodies	Zakon o izmjenama i dopunama Zakona o ustrojstvu i djelokrugu tijela državne uprave	
78/2024	June 21, 2024	Amendments to the Act on the Government of the Republic of Croatia	Zakon o izmjenama i dopuni Zakona o Vladi Republike Hrvatske	
85/2024	July 12, 2024	Act on the Implementation of Regulation (EU) 2023/1114 on Crypto-Asset Markets	Zakon o provedbi Uredbe (EU) 2023/1114 o tržištima kriptoimovine	
85/2024	July 12, 2024	Accounting Act	Zakon o računovodstvu	
85/2024	July 12, 2024	Amendments to the Audit Act	Zakon o izmjenama i dopunama Zakona o reviziji	
85/2024	July 12, 2024	Amendments to the Capital Market Act	Zakon o izmjenama i dopunama Zakona o tržištu kapitala	
85/2024	July 12, 2024	Amendments to the Act on Civil Servants	Zakon o izmjenama i dopunama Zakona o državnim službenicima	
123/2024	October 11, 2024	Amendments to the Nursing Act	Zakon o izmjenama i dopunama Zakona o sestrinstvu	
123/2024	October 11, 2024	Amendments to the Act on Lease and Purchase of Business Premises	Zakon o izmjenama i dopunama Zakona o zakupu i kupoprodaji poslovnoga prostora	
123/2024	October 11, 2024	Amendments to the Audiovisual Activities Act	Zakon o izmjenama i dopunama Zakona o audiovizualnim djelatnostima	
125/2024	October 25, 2024	Amendments to the State Budget of the Republic of Croatia for 2024 and projections for 2025 and 2026	Izmjene i dopune Državnog proračuna Republike Hrvatske za 2024. godinu i projekcija za 2025. i 2026. godinu	
125/2024	October 25, 2024	Amendments to the Act on the Execution of the State Budget of the Republic of Croatia for 2024	Zakon o izmjenama i dopuni Zakona o izvršavanju Državnog proračuna Republike Hrvatske za 2024. godinu	
127/2024	October 25, 2024	Amendments to the Land Registry Act	Zakon o izmjenama i dopunama Zakona o zemljišnim knjigama	
136/2024	November 15, 2024	Act on the implementation of European Union regulations in the field of payment transactions	Zakon o provedbi uredbi Europske unije iz područja platnog prometa	
136/2024	November 15, 2024	Act on the implementation of Regulation (EU) 2022/2554 on digital operational resilience for the financial sector	Zakon o provedbi Uredbe (EU) 2022/2554 o digitalnoj operativnoj otpornosti za financijski sektor	
136/2024	November 15, 2024	Amendments to the Payment Transactions Act	Zakon o izmjenama i dopunama Zakona o platnom prometu	
136/2024	November 15, 2024	Amendments to the Act on Electronic Money	Zakon o izmjenama i dopunama Zakona o elektroničkom novcu	
136/2024	November 15, 2024	Amendments to the Act on Settlement Finality in Payment Systems and Financial Instruments Settlement Systems	Zakon o izmjenama i dopuni Zakona o konačnosti namire u platnim sustavima i sustavima za namiru financijskih instrumenata	
136/2024	November 15, 2024	Amendments to the Act on the Financial Inspectorate of the Republic of Croatia	Zakon o izmjenama i dopunama Zakona o Financijskom inspektoratu Republike Hrvatske	
136/2024	November 15, 2024	Amendments to the Air Protection Act	Zakon o izmjenama i dopunama Zakona o zaštiti zraka	
136/2024	November 15, 2024	Amendments to the Companies Act	Zakon o izmjenama i dopunama Zakona o trgovačkim društvima	
136/2024	November 15, 2024	Amendments to the Road Transport Act	Zakon o izmjenama i dopunama Zakona o prijevozu u cestovnom prometu	
136/2024	November 15, 2024	Amendments to the Investment Promotion Act	Zakon o izmjenama i dopunama Zakona o poticanju ulaganja	
145/2024	December 6, 2024	Act on the Authority of the Government of the Republic of Croatia to Regulate Certain Issues from the Scope of the Croatian Parliament by Decrees	Zakon o ovlasti Vlade Republike Hrvatske da uredbama uređuje pojedina pitanja iz djelokruga Hrvatskoga sabora	
145/2024	December 6, 2024	Act on Temporary Support	Zakon o privremenom uzdržavanju	
145/2024	December 6, 2024	Protection and Preservation of Cultural Property Act	Zakon o zaštiti i očuvanju kulturnih dobara	
145/2024	December 6, 2024	Amendments to the Act on Credit Institutions	Zakon o izmjenama i dopunama Zakona o kreditnim institucijama	
145/2024	December 6, 2024	Amendments to the Act on Rehabilitation of Credit Institutions and Investment Companies	Zakon o izmjenama i dopunama Zakona o sanaciji kreditnih institucija i investicijskih društava	
145/2024	December 6, 2024	Amendments to the Accounting Act	Zakon o izmjenama i dopuni Zakona o računovodstvu	
145/2024	December 6, 2024	Amendments to the Audit Act	Zakon o izmjenama i dopuni Zakona o reviziji	
145/2024	December 6, 2024	Amendments to the Construction Act	Zakon o izmjenama i dopunama Zakona o gradnji	
145/2024	December 6, 2024	Amendments to the Act on Construction Inspection	Zakon o dopunama Zakona o građevinskoj inspekciji	
145/2024	December 6, 2024	Amendments to the Act on Municipal Economy	Zakon o izmjenama i dopunama Zakona o komunalnom gospodarstvu	
145/2024	December 6, 2024	Amendments to the Road Traffic Safety Act	Zakon o izmjenama i dopunama Zakona o sigurnosti prometa na cestama	
145/2024	December 6, 2024	Amendments to the Act implementing Council Regulation (EU) 2017/1939 from 12 October 2017 implementing enhanced cooperation on the establishment of the European Public Prosecutor's Office (EPPO)	Zakon o izmjeni Zakona o provedbi Uredbe Vijeća (EU) 2017/1939 od 12. listopada 2017. o provedbi pojačane suradnje u vezi s osnivanjem Ureda Europskog javnog tužitelja (»EPPO«)	
149/2024	December 6, 2024	State Budget of the Republic of Croatia for 2025 and projections for 2026 and 2027	Državni proračun Republike Hrvatske za 2025. godinu i projekcije za 2026. i 2027. godinu	
149/2024	December 6, 2024	Act on the Execution of the State Budget of the Republic of Croatia for 2025	Zakon o izvršavanju Državnog proračuna Republike Hrvatske za 2025. godinu	
152/2024	December 13, 2024	Act on the implementation of Regulation (EU) 2023/1542 of the European Parliament and of the Council from 12 July 2023 on batteries and waste batteries, amending Directive 2008/98/EC and Regulation (EU) 2019/1020 and repealing Directive 2006/66/EC	Zakon o provedbi Uredbe (EU) 2023/1542 Europskog parlamenta i Vijeća od 12. srpnja 2023. o baterijama i otpadnim baterijama, izmjeni Direktive 2008/98/EZ i Uredbe (EU) 2019/1020 te stavljanju izvan snage Direktive 2006/66/EZ	
152/2024	December 13, 2024	Act on Management and Maintenance of Buildings	Zakon o upravljanju i održavanju zgrada	
152/2024	December 13, 2024	Amendments to the Act on State Survey and the Real Estate Cadastre	Zakon o izmjenama i dopunama Zakona o državnoj izmjeri i katastru nekretnina	
152/2024	December 13, 2024	Amendments to the Local Taxes Act	Zakon o izmjenama i dopuni Zakona o lokalnim porezima	
152/2024	December 13, 2024	Amendments to the Income Tax Act	Zakon o izmjenama i dopunama Zakona o porezu na dohodak	
152/2024	December 13, 2024	Amendments to the Contributions Act	Zakon o izmjenama Zakona o doprinosima	
152/2024	December 13, 2024	Amendments to the Tax Administration Act	Zakon o izmjenama i dopunama Zakona o poreznoj upravi	
152/2024	December 13, 2024	Amendments to the Act on Value Added Tax	Zakon o izmjenama i dopunama Zakona o porezu na dodanu vrijednost	
152/2024	December 13, 2024	Amendments to the General Tax Act	Zakon o izmjenama i dopunama Općeg poreznog zakona	
152/2024	December 13, 2024	Amendments to the Act on Open-Ended Investment Funds with Public Offering	Zakon o izmjenama i dopunama Zakona o otvorenim investicijskim fondovima s javnom ponudom	
152/2024	December 13, 2024	Amendments to the Act on Alternative Investment Funds	Zakon o izmjenama i dopunama Zakona o alternativnim investicijskim fondovima	
152/2024	December 13, 2024	Amendments to the Insurance Act	Zakon o izmjenama i dopunama Zakona o osiguranju	
152/2024	December 13, 2024	Amendments to the Act on the Implementation of Regulation (EU) No. 909/2014 of the European Parliament and of the Council from 23 July 2014 on improving securities settlement in the European Union and on central securities depositories and amending Directives 98/26/EC and 2014/65/EU and Regulation (EU) No. 236/2012	Zakon o izmjenama i dopunama Zakona o provedbi Uredbe (EU) br. 909/2014 Europskog parlamenta i Vijeća od 23. srpnja 2014. o poboljšanju namire vrijednosnih papira u Europskoj uniji i o središnjim depozitorijima vrijednosnih papira te izmjeni direktiva 98/26/EZ i 2014/65/EU te Uredbe (EU) br. 236/2012	
152/2024	December 13, 2024	Amendments to the Hospitality Industry Act	Zakon o izmjenama i dopunama Zakona o ugostiteljskoj djelatnosti	
152/2024	December 13, 2024	Amendments to the Minimum Wage Act	Zakon o izmjenama i dopunama Zakona o minimalnoj plaći	
152/2024	December 13, 2024	Amendments to the Labor Market Act	Zakon o izmjenama i dopunama Zakona o tržištu rada	
152/2024	December 13, 2024	Amendments to the Agriculture Act	Zakon o izmjenama i dopunama Zakona o poljoprivredi	
152/2024	December 13, 2024	Amendments to the Foreign Affairs Act	Zakon o izmjenama i dopunama Zakona o vanjskim poslovima	
152/2024	December 13, 2024	Amendments to the Act on State Support for Research and Development Projects	Zakon o izmjenama i dopunama Zakona o državnoj potpori za istraživačko-razvojne projekte	
17/2025	January 24, 2025	Act implementing Regulation (EU) 2023/2631 on European Green Bonds and optional disclosures for bonds marketed as environmentally sustainable and for sustainability-related bonds	Zakon o provedbi Uredbe (EU) 2023/2631 o europskim zelenim obveznicama i neobveznim objavama za obveznice koje se stavljaju na tržište kao okolišno održive i za obveznice povezane s održivošću	
17/2025	January 24, 2025	Act on the Transfer of Real Estate Ownership to the Trade Union Real Estate Fund and to Trade Unions	Zakon o prijenosu vlasništva nekretnina na Sindikalni fond nekretnina i na sindikate	
17/2025	January 24, 2025	Act on the exchange of data between the law enforcement authorities of the member states of the European Union	Zakon o razmjeni podataka između tijela za provedbu zakona država članica Europske unije	
17/2025	January 24, 2025	Amendments to the Act on International and Temporary Protection	Zakon o izmjenama i dopunama Zakona o međunarodnoj i privremenoj zaštiti	
17/2025	January 24, 2025	Amendments to the Act on Representation in the Field of Industrial Property Rights	Zakon o izmjenama i dopunama Zakona o zastupanju u području prava industrijskog vlasništva	
17/2025	January 24, 2025	Amendments to the Act on Short Rotation Woody Crops	Zakon o izmjenama i dopunama Zakona o drvenastim kulturama kratkih ophodnji	
17/2025	January 24, 2025	Amendments to the Act on Officials and Employees in Local and Regional Self-Government	Zakon o izmjenama i dopunama Zakona o službenicima i namještenicima u lokalnoj i područnoj (regionalnoj) samoupravi	
17/2025	January 24, 2025	Amendments to the Act on the Electricity Market	Zakon o izmjenama Zakona o tržištu električne energije	
31/2025	February 11, 2025	Amendments to the Act on Regulation of the Railway Services Market and Protection of Passenger Rights in Railway Transport	Zakon o izmjenama i dopunama Zakona o regulaciji tržišta željezničkih usluga i zaštiti prava putnika u željezničkom prijevozu	
31/2025	February 11, 2025	Amendments to the Act on the Institutional Framework for the Use of European Union Funds in the Republic of Croatia	Zakon o izmjenama Zakona o institucionalnom okviru za korištenje fondova Europske unije u Republici Hrvatskoj	
34/2025	February 21, 2025	Amendments to the Act on Maternity and Parental Benefits	Zakon o izmjenama i dopunama Zakona o rodiljnim i roditeljskim potporama	
34/2025	February 21, 2025	Amendments to the Act on Salaries and Other Material Rights of Judicial Officials	Zakon o izmjeni Zakona o plaći i drugim materijalnim pravima pravosudnih dužnosnika	
40/2025	February 21, 2025	Act on Exceptional Price Control Measures	Zakon o iznimnim mjerama kontrole cijena	
40/2025	February 21, 2025	Act on the implementation of Regulation (EU) 2021/2282 of the European Parliament and of the Council of 15 December 2021 on health technology assessment and amending Directive 2011/24/EU	Zakon o provedbi Uredbe (EU) 2021/2282 Europskog parlamenta i Vijeća od 15. prosinca 2021. o procjeni zdravstvenih tehnologija i izmjeni Direktive 2011/24/EU	
40/2025	February 21, 2025	Act implementing Regulation (EU) 2023/1322 of the European Parliament and of the Council of 27 June 2023 on the European Union Drugs Agency (EUDA) and repealing Regulation (EC) No 1920/2006	Zakon o provedbi Uredbe (EU) 2023/1322 Europskog parlamenta i Vijeća od 27. lipnja 2023. o Agenciji Europske unije za droge (EUDA) i stavljanju izvan snage Uredbe (EZ) br. 1920/2006	
40/2025	February 21, 2025	Amendments to the Act on the Quality of Health Care	Zakon o izmjenama i dopunama Zakona o kvaliteti zdravstvene zaštite	
40/2025	February 21, 2025	Amendments to the Energy Efficiency Act	Zakon o izmjenama i dopunama Zakona o energetskoj učinkovitosti	
40/2025	February 21, 2025	Amendments to the Act on Foreigners	Zakon o izmjenama i dopunama Zakona o strancima	
40/2025	February 21, 2025	Amendments to the Act on Special Rights from Pension Insurance for Employees in Demining Operations	Zakon o izmjenama Zakona o posebnim pravima iz mirovinskog osiguranja zaposlenika na poslovima razminiranja	
40/2025	February 21, 2025	Amendments to the Act on the National Center for External Evaluation of Education	Zakon o izmjeni i dopuni Zakona o nacionalnom centru za vanjsko vrednovanje obrazovanja	
52/2025	March 14, 2025	Amendments to the Act on Voluntary Pension Funds	Zakon o izmjenama i dopunama Zakona o dobrovoljnim mirovinskim fondovima	
52/2025	March 14, 2025	Amendments to the Act on Pension Insurance Companies	Zakon o izmjenama i dopunama Zakona o mirovinskim osiguravajućim društvima	
52/2025	March 14, 2025	Amendments to the Act on the Implementation of the Customs Legislation of the European Union	Zakon o izmjenama i dopunama Zakona o provedbi carinskog zakonodavstva Europske unije	
52/2025	March 14, 2025	Amendments to the Act on Value Added Tax	Zakon o izmjeni Zakona o porezu na dodanu vrijednost	
52/2025	March 14, 2025	Amendments to the Act on Ownership and Other Real Rights	Zakon o izmjeni Zakona o vlasništvu i drugim stvarnim pravima	
61/2025	March 28, 2025	Amendments to the Social Welfare Act	Zakon o izmjenama i dopunama Zakona o socijalnoj skrbi	
67/2025	March 28, 2025	Climate Change and Ozone Layer Protection Act	Zakon o klimatskim promjenama i zaštiti ozonskog sloja	
67/2025	March 28, 2025	Act on the Central Population Registry	Zakon o Središnjem registru stanovništva	
67/2025	March 28, 2025	Act implementing Regulation (EU) 2022/2065 of the European Parliament and of the Council from 19 October 2022 on the single market for digital services and amending Directive 2000/31/EC (Digital Services Act)	Zakon o provedbi Uredbe (EU) 2022/2065 Europskog parlamenta i Vijeća od 19. listopada 2022. o jedinstvenom tržištu digitalnih usluga i izmjeni Direktive 2000/31/EZ (Akt o digitalnim uslugama)	
67/2025	March 28, 2025	Amendments to the Thermal Energy Market Act	Zakon o izmjenama i dopunama Zakona o tržištu toplinske energije	
72/2025	April 11, 2025	Act on Sports Inspection	Zakon o sportskoj inspekciji	
72/2025	April 11, 2025	Act on State Information Infrastructure	Zakon o državnoj informacijskoj infrastrukturi	
72/2025	April 11, 2025	Amendments to the Criminal Procedure Act	Zakon o izmjenama i dopuni Zakona o kaznenom postupku	
72/2025	April 11, 2025	Amendments to the Act on Holidays, Memorial Days and Non-Working Days in the Republic of Croatia	Zakon o dopuni Zakona o blagdanima, spomendanima i neradnim danima u Republici Hrvatskoj	
72/2025	April 11, 2025	Amendments to the Act on Gambling Games	Zakon o izmjenama i dopunama Zakona o igrama na sreću	
72/2025	April 11, 2025	Amendments to the Act on Socially Incentive Housing Construction	Zakon o izmjenama i dopunama Zakona o društveno poticanoj stanogradnji	
78/2025	April 30, 2025	Cemeteries Act	Zakon o grobljima	
78/2025	April 30, 2025	Act on the Termination of the General Product Safety Act	Zakon o prestanku važenja Zakona o općoj sigurnosti proizvoda	
78/2025	April 30, 2025	Act on the Implementation of Regulation (EU) 2023/988 on General Product Safety	Zakon o provedbi Uredbe (EU) 2023/988 o općoj sigurnosti proizvoda	
78/2025	April 30, 2025	Amendments to the Act on Renewable Energy Sources and High-Efficiency Cogeneration	Zakon o izmjenama i dopunama Zakona o obnovljivim izvorima energije i visokoučinkovitoj kogeneraciji	
78/2025	April 30, 2025	Amendments to the Act on the Consolidation of Agricultural Land	Zakon o izmjenama i dopunama Zakona o komasaciji poljoprivrednog zemljišta	
80/2025	May 14, 2025	Correction of the Cemeteries Act	Ispravak Zakona o grobljima	
89/2025	June 6, 2025	Act on Accessibility Requirements for Products and Services	Zakon o zahtjevima za pristupačnost proizvoda i usluga	
89/2025	June 6, 2025	Critical Infrastructure Act	Zakon o kritičnoj infrastrukturi	
89/2025	June 6, 2025	Fiscalization Act	Zakon o fiskalizaciji	
96/2025	June 27, 2025	Pension Insurance Act	Zakon o mirovinskom osiguranju	
98/2025	June 27, 2025	Amendments to the Act on Notary Fees	Zakon o izmjenama i dopuni Zakona o javnobilježničkim pristojbama	
98/2025	June 27, 2025	Amendments to the Act on the Legal Profession	Zakon o izmjenama i dopunama Zakona o odvjetništvu	
98/2025	June 27, 2025	Amendments to the Act on Restricting the Use of Tobacco and Related Products	Zakon o izmjenama i dopunama Zakona o ograničavanju uporabe duhanskih i srodnih proizvoda	
98/2025	June 27, 2025	Amendments to the Act on Relations between the Republic of Croatia and Croats Outside the Republic of Croatia	Zakon o izmjenama i dopunama Zakona o odnosima Republike Hrvatske s Hrvatima izvan Republike Hrvatske	
102/2025	July 15, 2025	Act on Legal Entities Owned by the Republic of Croatia	Zakon o pravnim osobama u vlasništvu Republike Hrvatske	
102/2025	July 15, 2025	Act on the Center for Restructuring and Sale	Zakon o Centru za restrukturiranje i prodaju	
102/2025	July 15, 2025	Amendments to the Health Care Act	Zakon o izmjenama i dopunama Zakona o zdravstvenoj zaštiti	
105/2025	July 15, 2025	Act on Logopedic Practice	Zakon o logopedskoj djelatnosti	
105/2025	July 15, 2025	Amendments to the Act on Compulsory Health Insurance	Zakon o izmjenama i dopuni Zakona o obveznom zdravstvenom osiguranju	
105/2025	July 15, 2025	Amendments to the Act on the Internal Control System in the Public Sector	Zakon o izmjenama i dopunama Zakona o sustavu unutarnjih kontrola u javnom sektoru	
105/2025	July 15, 2025	Amendments to the Act on Comparability of Fees, Transfer of Payment Accounts and Access to the Basic Account	Zakon o izmjenama i dopunama Zakona o usporedivosti naknada, prebacivanju računa za plaćanje i pristupu osnovnom računu	
105/2025	July 15, 2025	Amendments to the Act on Textbooks and Other Educational Materials for Primary and Secondary Schools	Zakon o izmjenama i dopunama Zakona o udžbenicima i drugim obrazovnim materijalima za osnovnu i srednju školu	
124/2025	September 24, 2025	Correction of the Official Statistics Act	Ispravak Zakona o službenoj statistici	
126/2025	September 26, 2025	Act on the implementation of Regulation (EU) 2022/868 on European data management and amending Regulation (EU) 2018/1724 (Data Management Act)	Zakon o provedbi Uredbe (EU) 2022/868 o europskom upravljanju podacima i izmjeni Uredbe (EU) 2018/1724 (Akt o upravljanju podacima)	
126/2025	September 26, 2025	Amendments to the Capital Market Act	Zakon o izmjenama i dopunama Zakona o tržištu kapitala	
126/2025	September 26, 2025	Amendments to the Act on the Provision of Services in Tourism	Zakon o izmjenama Zakona o pružanju usluga u turizmu	
126/2025	September 26, 2025	Amendments to the Act on Regulated Professions and Recognition of Foreign Professional Qualifications	Zakon o izmjenama Zakona o reguliranim profesijama i priznavanju inozemnih stručnih kvalifikacija	
134/2025	September 26, 2025	Amendments to the Act on the Execution of the State Budget of the Republic of Croatia for 2025	Zakon o izmjeni i dopuni Zakona o izvršavanju Državnog proračuna Republike Hrvatske za 2025. godinu	
134/2025	October 24, 2025	Amendments to the State Budget of the Republic of Croatia for 2025 and projections for 2026 and 2027	Izmjene i dopune Državnog proračuna Republike Hrvatske za 2025. godinu i projekcija za 2026. i 2027. godinu	
136/2025	October 24, 2025	Act on the Protection of Geographical Indications for Craft and Industrial Products	Zakon o zaštiti oznaka zemljopisnog podrijetla za obrtničke i industrijske proizvode	
136/2025	October 24, 2025	Act on Verification of Foreign Investments	Zakon o provjeri stranih ulaganja	
136/2025	October 24, 2025	Amendments to the Defense Act	Zakon o izmjenama i dopunama Zakona o obrani	
136/2025	October 24, 2025	Amendments to the Act on Service in the Armed Forces of the Republic of Croatia	Zakon o izmjenama i dopunama Zakona o službi u oružanim snagama Republike Hrvatske	
136/2025	October 24, 2025	Amendments to the Agricultural Land Act	Zakon o dopuni Zakona o poljoprivrednom zemljištu	
136/2025	October 24, 2025	Amendments to the Medicines Act	Zakon o izmjenama i dopunama Zakona o lijekovima	
136/2025	October 24, 2025	Amendments to the Act on the State Attorney's Office	Zakon o izmjenama i dopunama Zakona o državnom odvjetništvu	
136/2025	October 24, 2025	Amendments to the Act on Courts	Zakon o izmjenama i dopunama Zakona o sudovima	
136/2025	October 24, 2025	Amendments to the Act on the Office for the Suppression of Corruption and Organised Crime	Zakon o izmjenama i dopunama Zakona o uredu za suzbijanje korupcije i organiziranog kriminaliteta	
136/2025	October 24, 2025	Amendments to the Criminal Code	Zakon o izmjenama i dopunama Kaznenog zakona	
136/2025	October 24, 2025	Amendments to the Act on the Protection of Whistleblowers	Zakon o izmjenama i dopunama Zakona o zaštiti prijavitelja nepravilnosti	
146/2025	November 21, 2025	Act on the Authority of the Government of the Republic of Croatia to Regulate Certain Issues from the Scope of the Croatian Parliament by Decrees	Zakon o ovlasti Vlade Republike Hrvatske da uredbama uređuje pojedina pitanja iz djelokruga Hrvatskoga sabora	
146/2025	November 21, 2025	Amendments to the Act on Administrative Cooperation in the Field of Taxation	Zakon o izmjenama i dopunama Zakona o administrativnoj suradnji u području poreza	
146/2025	November 21, 2025	Amendments to the Act on Civil Procedure	Zakon o izmjeni i dopunama Zakona o parničnom postupku	
151/2025	December 5, 2025	Contaminants Act	Zakon o kontaminantima	
151/2025	December 5, 2025	Act on the Implementation of Regulation (EU) 2023/1115 on making available on the Union market and exporting from the Union certain goods and certain products related to deforestation and forest degradation	Zakon o provedbi Uredbe (EU) 2023/1115 o stavljanju na raspolaganje na tržištu Unije i izvozu iz Unije određene robe i određenih proizvoda povezanih s deforestacijom i degradacijom šuma	
151/2025	December 5, 2025	Act on cross-border acquisition of electronic evidence in criminal proceedings	Zakon o prekograničnom pribavljanju elektroničkih dokaza u kaznenim postupcima	
151/2025	December 5, 2025	Amendments to the Act on Housing in Subsidized Areas	Zakon o izmjenama i dopunama Zakona o stambenom zbrinjavanju na potpomognutim područjima	
151/2025	December 5, 2025	Amendments to the Act on Restrictive Measures	Zakon o izmjenama i dopunama Zakona o mjerama ograničavanja	
151/2025	December 5, 2025	Amendments to the Act on the Protection and Preservation of Cultural Property	Zakon o izmjeni Zakona o zaštiti i očuvanju kulturnih dobara	
151/2025	December 5, 2025	Amendments to the Act on the Croatian Agriculture and Food Agency	Zakon o izmjeni i dopunama Zakona o Hrvatskoj agenciji za poljoprivredu i hranu	
151/2025	December 5, 2025	Amendments to the Accounting Act	Zakon o izmjenama i dopunama Zakona o računovodstvu	
151/2025	December 5, 2025	Amendments to the Audit Act	Zakon o izmjenama i dopunama Zakona o reviziji	
151/2025	December 5, 2025	Amendments to the Financial Conglomerates Act	Zakon o dopunama Zakona o financijskim konglomeratima	
151/2025	December 5, 2025	Amendments to the Insurance Act	Zakon o izmjenama i dopunama Zakona o osiguranju	
151/2025	December 5, 2025	Amendments to the Act on Issuance of Covered Bonds and Public Supervision of Covered Bonds	Zakon o izmjenama i dopunama Zakona o izdavanju pokrivenih obveznica i javnom nadzoru pokrivenih obveznica	
151/2025	December 5, 2025	Amendments to the Act on Takeover of Joint Stock Companies	Zakon o izmjenama i dopunama Zakona o preuzimanju dioničkih društava	
151/2025	December 5, 2025	Amendments to the Act on Minimum Global Profit Tax	Zakon o izmjenama i dopunama Zakona o minimalnom globalnom porezu na dobit	
151/2025	December 5, 2025	Amendments to the Corporate Tax Act	Zakon o izmjenama i dopunama Zakona o porezu na dobit	
151/2025	December 5, 2025	Amendments to the Act on Value Added Tax	Zakon o izmjenama i dopunama Zakona o porezu na dodanu vrijednost	
151/2025	December 5, 2025	Amendments to the General Tax Act	Zakon o izmjenama i dopunama Općeg poreznog zakona	
152/2025	December 5, 2025	State Budget of the Republic of Croatia for 2026 and projections for 2027 and 2028	Državni proračun Republike Hrvatske za 2026. godinu i projekcije za 2027. i 2028. godinu	
152/2025	December 5, 2025	Act on the Execution of the State Budget of the Republic of Croatia for 2026	Zakon o izvršavanju Državnog proračuna Republike Hrvatske za 2026. godinu	
155/2025	December 15, 2025	Act on Physical Planning	Zakon o prostornom uređenju	
155/2025	December 15, 2025	Construction Act	Zakon o gradnji	
155/2025	December 15, 2025	Act on Energy Efficiency in Buildings	Zakon o energetskoj učinkovitosti u zgradarstvu	
155/2025	December 15, 2025	Energy Efficiency Act	Zakon o energetskoj učinkovitosti	
156/2025	December 15, 2025	Toll Collection Act	Zakon o naplati cestarine	
156/2025	December 15, 2025	Act on the Construction of a Center for the Disposal of Radioactive Waste	Zakon o izgradnji Centra za zbrinjavanje radioaktivnog otpada	
13/2026	January 29, 2026	Act on Islands	Zakon o otocima	
13/2026	January 29, 2026	Amendments to the Act implementing Regulation (EU) 2017/852 of the European Parliament and of the Council of 17 May 2017 on mercury and repealing Regulation (EC) No 1102/2008	Zakon o izmjenama i dopunama Zakona o provedbi Uredbe (EU) 2017/852 Europskog parlamenta i Vijeća od 17. svibnja 2017. o živi i stavljanju izvan snage Uredbe (EZ) br. 1102/2008	
13/2026	January 29, 2026	Amendments to the Criminal Procedure Act	Zakon o izmjenama i dopunama Zakona o kaznenom postupku	
13/2026	January 29, 2026	Amendments to the Act on Civilian Victims of the Homeland War	Zakon o izmjenama i dopunama Zakona o civilnim stradalnicima iz Domovinskog rata	
13/2026	January 29, 2026	Amendments to the Act on State Border Surveillance	Zakon o izmjenama i dopunama Zakona o nadzoru državne granice	
13/2026	January 29, 2026	Amendments to the Act on Voluntary Pension Funds	Zakon o izmjenama i dopunama Zakona o dobrovoljnim mirovinskim fondovima	
13/2026	January 29, 2026	Amendments to the Act on Pension Insurance Companies	Zakon o izmjenama i dopunama Zakona o mirovinskim osiguravajućim društvima	
13/2026	January 29, 2026	Amendments to the Act on Open-Ended Investment Funds with Public Offering	Zakon o izmjenama i dopunama Zakona o otvorenim investicijskim fondovima s javnom ponudom	
13/2026	January 29, 2026	Amendments to the Act on Alternative Investment Funds	Zakon o izmjenama i dopunama Zakona o alternativnim investicijskim fondovima	
22/2026	February 20, 2026	Act on Credit Institutions	Zakon o kreditnim institucijama	
22/2026	February 20, 2026	Act implementing Regulation (EU) No. 2024/900 of the European Parliament and of the Council on transparency and targeting of political advertising	Zakon o provedbi Uredbe (EU) br. 2024/900 Europskog parlamenta i Vijeća o transparentnosti i ciljanju u političkom oglašavanju	
22/2026	February 20, 2026	Amendments to the Act on Preschool Education	Zakon o izmjenama i dopuni Zakona o predškolskom odgoju i obrazovanju	
27/2026	March 6, 2026	Act on the Proclamation of the "Zagorske Gore" Nature Park	Zakon o proglašenju Parka prirode »Zagorske gore«	
27/2026	March 6, 2026	Act on the implementation of Regulation (EU) 2024/1083 establishing a common framework for media services in the internal market and amending Directive 2010/13/EU (European Media Freedom Act)	Zakon o provedbi Uredbe (EU) 2024/1083 o uspostavi zajedničkog okvira za medijske usluge na unutarnjem tržištu i izmjeni Direktive 2010/13/EU (Europski akt o slobodi medija)	
27/2026	March 6, 2026	Act on Mediation	Zakon o medijaciji	
27/2026	March 6, 2026	Foreign Exchange Act	Zakon o deviznom poslovanju	
32/2026	March 27, 2026	Amendments to the Act on Value Added Tax	Zakon o izmjeni Zakona o porezu na dodanu vrijednost	
37/2026	March 27, 2026	Act on Railway Transport Contracts	Zakon o ugovorima o prijevozu u željezničkom prometu	
37/2026	March 27, 2026	Act on the implementation of Regulation (EU) 2024/1787 on the reduction of methane emissions in the energy sector	Zakon o provedbi Uredbe (EU) 2024/1787 o smanjenju emisija metana u energetskom sektoru	
37/2026	March 27, 2026	Amendments to the Act on the Implementation of Regulation (EU) 2016/1011 on Indices Used as Reference Values	Zakon o izmjenama i dopunama Zakona o provedbi Uredbe (EU) 2016/1011 o indeksima koji se upotrebljavaju kao referentne vrijednosti	
45/2026	April 21, 2026	Affordable Housing Act	Zakon o priuštivom stanovanju	
45/2026	April 21, 2026	Act on Regional Development of the Republic of Croatia	Zakon o regionalnom razvoju Republike Hrvatske	
45/2026	April 21, 2026	Amendments to the Capital Market Act	Zakon o dopunama Zakona o tržištu kapitala	
45/2026	April 21, 2026	Amendments to the Act on Electronic Communications	Zakon o izmjenama i dopunama Zakona o elektroničkim komunikacijama	
48/2026	April 30, 2026	Act on the List of Occupational Diseases	Zakon o Listi profesionalnih bolesti	
48/2026	April 30, 2026	Amendments to the Act on Value Added Tax	Zakon o dopuni Zakona o porezu na dodanu vrijednost	
48/2026	April 30, 2026	Amendments to the Act on Mandatory Health Surveillance of Workers Occupationally Exposed to Asbestos	Zakon o izmjenama Zakona o obveznom zdravstvenom nadzoru radnika profesionalno izloženih azbestu	
48/2026	April 30, 2026	Amendments to the Act on Indemnification of Workers Professionally Exposed to Asbestos	Zakon o izmjenama Zakona o obeštećenju radnika profesionalno izloženih azbestu	
48/2026	April 30, 2026	Amendments to the Act on Compulsory Liquidation of Credit Institutions	Zakon o izmjeni i dopunama Zakona o prisilnoj likvidaciji kreditnih institucija	
48/2026	April 30, 2026	Amendments to the Act on Rehabilitation of Credit Institutions and Investment Companies	Zakon o izmjenama i dopuni Zakona o sanaciji kreditnih institucija i investicijskih društava	
48/2026	April 30, 2026	Amendments to the Act on Handling Illegally Constructed Buildings	Zakon o izmjenama i dopuni Zakona o postupanju s nezakonito izgrađenim zgradama	
48/2026	April 30, 2026	Amendments to the Public Procurement Act	Zakon o izmjenama i dopunama Zakona o javnoj nabavi	
48/2026	April 30, 2026	Amendments to the Act on Construction Products	Zakon o izmjenama i dopunama Zakona o građevnim proizvodima	
55/2026	May 15, 2026	Act on the Croatian Bank for Reconstruction and Development	Zakon o Hrvatskoj banci za obnovu i razvitak	
55/2026	May 15, 2026	Act on the Development of Nuclear Energy for Civil Purposes	Zakon o razvoju nuklearne energije u civilne svrhe	
55/2026	May 15, 2026	Amendments to the Act on Foreigners	Zakon o izmjenama i dopunama Zakona o strancima	
59/2026	May 29, 2026	Act on the Implementation of Regulation (EU) no. 648/2012 on OTC derivatives, central counterparty and trade repository	Zakon o provedbi Uredbe (EU) br. 648/2012 o OTC izvedenicama, središnjoj drugoj ugovornoj strani i trgovinskom repozitoriju	
59/2026	May 29, 2026	Amendments to the Accounting Act	Zakon o izmjenama i dopunama Zakona o računovodstvu	
59/2026	May 29, 2026	Amendments to the Consumer Protection Act	Zakon o izmjenama i dopunama Zakona o zaštiti potrošača	
59/2026	May 29, 2026	Amendments to the Trade Act	Zakon o izmjenama i dopunama Zakona o trgovini	
59/2026	May 29, 2026	Amendments to the Act on the Legal Profession	Zakon o izmjenama i dopunama Zakona o odvjetništvu	
59/2026	May 29, 2026	Amendments to the Act on Working Hours, Mandatory Rest Periods for Mobile Workers and Recording Devices in Road Transport	Zakon o izmjenama i dopunama Zakona o radnom vremenu, obveznim odmorima mobilnih radnika i uređajima za bilježenje u cestovnom prijevozu	
59/2026	May 29, 2026	Amendments to the Act on International and Temporary Protection	Zakon o izmjenama i dopunama Zakona o međunarodnoj i privremenoj zaštiti	
69/2026	May 29, 2026	Act implementing Regulation (EU) 2024/1991 of the European Parliament and of the Council from 24 June 2024 on nature restoration and amending Regulation (EU) 2022/869	Zakon o provedbi Uredbe (EU) 2024/1991 Europskog parlamenta i Vijeća od 24. lipnja 2024. o obnovi prirode i izmjeni Uredbe (EU) 2022/869	
69/2026	June 19, 2026	Act on Mediation in Real Estate Transactions	Zakon o posredovanju u prometu nekretnina	
69/2026	June 19, 2026	Free Zones Act	Zakon o slobodnim zonama	
69/2026	June 19, 2026	Act on Veterinary Medicines and Veterinary Medical Products	Zakon o veterinarskim lijekovima i veterinarskim medicinskim proizvodim	
69/2026	June 19, 2026	Act on the Protection of Persons Involved in Public Activities	Zakon o zaštiti osoba uključenih u javno djelovanje	
69/2026	June 19, 2026	Amendments to the Civil Obligations Act	Zakon o izmjenama i dopunama Zakona o obveznim odnosima	
69/2026	June 19, 2026	Amendments to the Consumer Bankruptcy Act	Zakon o izmjenama i dopuni Zakona o stečaju potrošača	
69/2026	June 19, 2026	Amendments to the Act on Suppression of Undeclared Work	Zakon o izmjenama i dopunama Zakona o suzbijanju neprijavljenoga rada	
69/2026	June 19, 2026	Amendments to the Act on Official Statistics	Zakon o izmjenama i dopunama Zakona o službenoj statistici	
77/2026	July 3, 2026	Act on the implementation of Regulation (EU) 2023/1805 on the use of renewable and low-carbon fuels in maritime transport and amending Directive 2009/16/EC	Zakon o provedbi Uredbe (EU) 2023/1805 o upotrebi obnovljivih i niskougljičnih goriva u pomorskom prometu i izmjeni Direktive 2009/16/EZ	
77/2026	July 3, 2026	Amendments to the Road Transport Act	Zakon o izmjenama i dopunama Zakona o prijevozu u cestovnom prometu	
77/2026	July 3, 2026	Amendments to the Act on the State Judicial Council	Zakon o izmjenama i dopunama Zakona o Državnom sudbenom vijeću	
77/2026	July 3, 2026	Amendments to the Act on the State Attorney's Council	Zakon o izmjenama i dopunama Zakona o Državnoodvjetničkom vijeću	
77/2026	July 3, 2026	Amendments to the Act on the Judicial Academy	Zakon o izmjenama Zakona o Pravosudnoj akademiji	
86/2026	July 15, 2026	Consumer Loans Act	Zakon o potrošačkim kreditima	
86/2026	July 15, 2026	Act on Judicial Cooperation in Criminal Matters with the Member States of the European Union	Zakon o pravosudnoj suradnji u kaznenim stvarima s državama članicama Europske unije	
86/2026	July 15, 2026	Amendments to the Misdemeanor Act	Zakon o izmjenama i dopunama Prekršajnog zakona	
110/2026	September 25, 2026	Amendments to the Act on Higher Education and Scientific Activity	Zakon o izmjenama i dopunama Zakona o visokom obrazovanju i znanstvenoj djelatnosti	
114/2026	September 25, 2026	Act on exploration and exploitation of energy georesources	Zakon o istraživanju i eksploataciji energetskih georesursa	
114/2026	September 25, 2026	Act on the Implementation of Regulation (EU) 2024/1781 of the European Parliament and of the Council of 13 June 2024 establishing a framework for setting ecodesign requirements for sustainable products, amending Directive (EU) 2020/1828 and Regulation (EU) 2023/1542, and repealing Directive 2009/125/EC	Zakon o provedbi Uredbe (EU) 2024/1781 Europskog parlamenta i Vijeća od 13. lipnja 2024. o uspostavi okvira za utvrđivanje zahtjeva za ekološki dizajn održivih proizvoda, izmjeni Direktive (EU) 2020/1828 i Uredbe (EU) 2023/1542 te stavljanju izvan snage Direktive 2009/125/EZ	
114/2026	September 25, 2026	Amendments to the Electricity Market Act	Zakon o izmjenama i dopunama Zakona o tržištu električne energije	
114/2026	September 25, 2026	Amendments to the Crafts Act	Zakon o izmjenama i dopunama Zakona o obrtu	
114/2026	September 25, 2026	Amendments to the Act on Accessibility Requirements for Products and Services	Zakon o izmjenama i dopunama Zakona o zahtjevima za pristupačnost proizvoda i usluga	
123/2026	October 21, 2026	Amendments to the Capital Market Act	Zakon o izmjenama i dopunama Zakona o tržištu kapitala	
126/2026	October 30, 2026	Amendments to the State Budget of the Republic of Croatia for 2026 and projections for 2027 and 2028	Izmjene i dopune Državnog proračuna Republike Hrvatske za 2026. godinu i projekcija za 2027. i 2028. godinu	
126/2026	October 30, 2026	Amendments to the Act on the Execution of the State Budget of the Republic of Croatia for 2026	Zakon o izmjenama i dopunama Zakona o izvršavanju Državnog proračuna Republike Hrvatske za 2026. godinu	
128/2026	October 30, 2026	Act on the Implementation of Regulation (EU) 2023/1230 of the European Parliament and of the Council of 14 June 2023 on machinery, and repealing Directive 2006/42/EC of the European Parliament and of the Council and Council Directive 73/361/EEC	Zakon o provedbi Uredbe (EU) 2023/1230 Europskog parlamenta i Vijeća od 14. lipnja 2023. o strojevima te stavljanju izvan snage Direktive 2006/42/EZ Europskog parlamenta i Vijeća i Direktive Vijeća 73/361/EEZ	
128/2026	October 30, 2026	Act on the Implementation of Regulation (EU) 2023/956 of the European Parliament and of the Council of 10 May 2023 establishing a carbon border adjustment mechanism	Zakon o provedbi Uredbe (EU) 2023/956 Europskog parlamenta i Vijeća od 10. svibnja 2023. o uspostavi mehanizma za ugljičnu prilagodbu na granicama	
128/2026	October 30, 2026	Amendments to the Act on Persons Missing in the Homeland War	Zakon o izmjenama i dopuni Zakona o osobama nestalim u Domovinskom ratu	
128/2026	October 30, 2026	Amendments to the Hunting Act	Zakon o izmjenama i dopunama Zakona o lovstvu	

== See also ==
- List of members of the Sabor, 2024–present
- 2024 Croatian parliamentary election
