= 2021 Croatian census =

4th decennial census in Croatia

2021 Census of population, households and apartments in the Republic of Croatia
← 2011	August 31, 2021

General information
- Country: Croatia
- Topics: Census topics: Population; Household; Housing and other residential units
- Authority: Croatian Bureau of Statistics
- Website: dzs.gov.hr

Results
- Total population: 3,871,833 (▼9.64%)
- Most populous state: Zagreb (767,131)
- Least populous state: Lika-Senj county (42,748)

The Census of population, households and apartments in the Republic of Croatia in 2021 (Croatian: Popis stanovništva, kućanstva i stanova u Republici Hrvatskoj 2021. godine; shortened: Census 2021, Popis 2021.) was the 4th decennial Croatian census. Census Day, the reference day used for the census, was August 31, 2021. This was the first Croatian census to offer options to online self-numeration, in addition to the paper response form used for previous censuses. The census was taken during the COVID-19 pandemic, which affected its administration. The census recorded a resident population of 3,871,833 in the twenty counties and the City of Zagreb, a decrease of 9.64 percent, or 413,056 over the preceding decade. The fall rate was the biggest ever recorded.

== Questions and data uses ==
The Census collects the following data:

1. Population
  - surname and first name, gender, personal identification number (PIN), date of birth, marital status; the type of living community in which a person lives; number of live births; place of residence/residence; presence in the census settlement at the time of the Census; reason for absence/presence; time of absence/presence; time of intention of absence/presence; place of absence/place of residence; birthplace; place of residence of the mother at the time of the person's birth; the place from which the person immigrated and the year and reason for immigrating; the foreign country where the person resided for a year or longer, the year of moving to the Republic of Croatia and the reason for staying abroad; citizenship; nationality (national affiliation); mother tongue; religious affiliation; achieved education; attending school/studies; economic activity, position in employment; interest; activities; main sources of livelihood; place of work/school; frequency of returning to the place of residence; means of travel to work/school/study
2. Households
  - relative and family composition of the household; type of household; the basis on which the household uses the apartment; area of used agricultural land and ownership of livestock or poultry
3. Housing and other residential units
  - type and manner of use of the residential unit; apartment ownership; surface area of the apartment; number of rooms in the apartment; kitchen, bathroom and toilet in the apartment; types of installations in the apartment (water supply, sewage, electricity, gas installations); method of heating the apartment; type of energy source; air conditioning; type of building in which the apartment is located; the number of apartments in the building where the apartment is located, the location of the apartment in the building; year of construction of the building in which the apartment is located.

== Timeline ==
- 3 April 2021: Law on the Census of Population, Households and Apartments in the Republic of Croatia in 2021 entered into force
- 13–26 September 2021: citizens could be registered independently using the census questionnaire in electronic form that was available on the e-Citizens portal, simultaneously listing the household and the apartment in which they live
- 27 September – 14 November 2021: enumerators used electronic devices to enumerate all census units that were not self-enumerated and controlled the data collected by self-enumeration
- 22 September 2022: the final results of the Census 2021 have been published

== County rankings ==
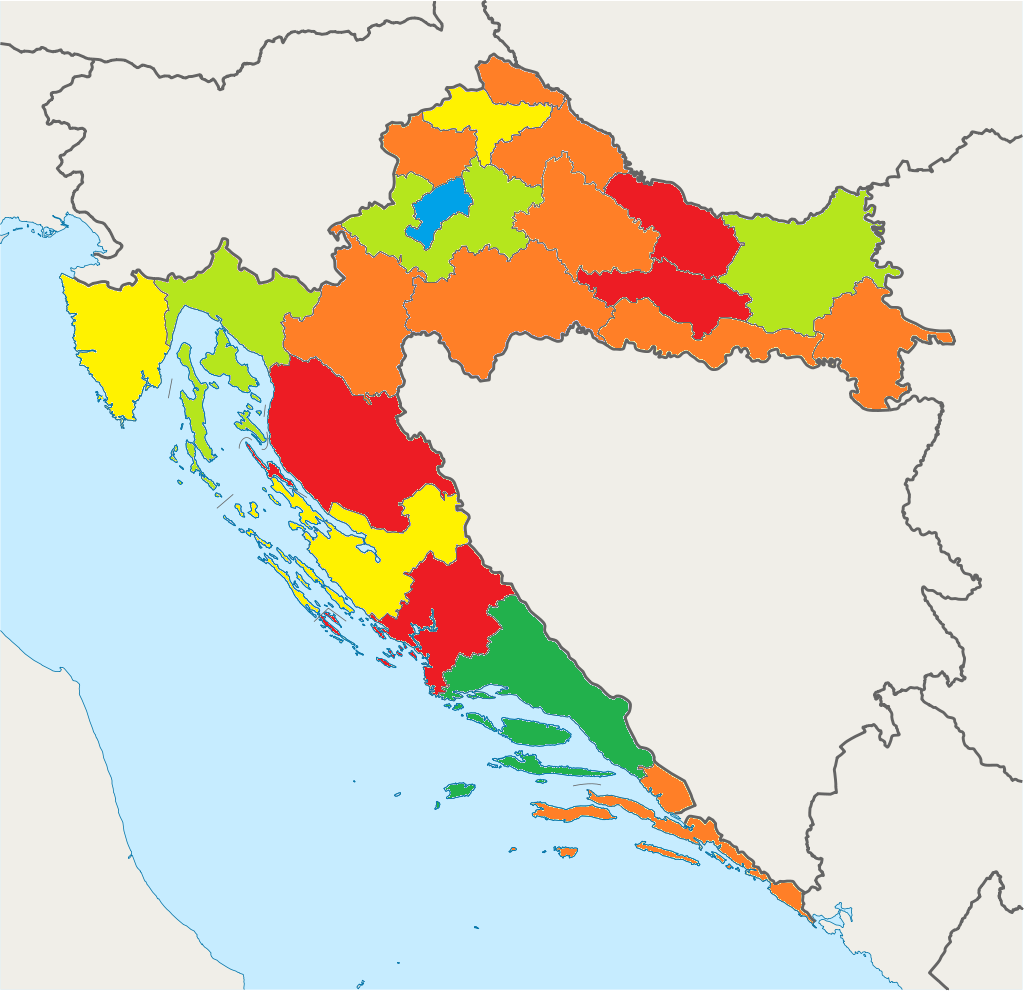
2021 Croatian census by counties

A population decline was recorded in each of 20 counties and the City of Zagreb. The biggest decline in apsolute numbers was in Osijek-Baranja County, which lost 47,006 inhabitants, while the relative decrease was the strongest in Vukovar-Srijem and Sisak-Moslavina County, at 20.3 and 19.0 percent respectively. The 2020 Petrinja earthquake caused a lot of damage in Sisak-Moslavina County. On the other hand, Zagreb had a large influx of citizens from other parts of Croatia, giving it the smallest relative change.

Population and population change in Croatia by county
Rank	County	Population as of 2021 census	Population as of 2011 census	Change	Percent change
1	Zagreb	767,131	790,017	▼22,886	▼2.9
2	Split-Dalmatia	423,407	454,798	▼31,391	▼6.9
3	Zagreb County	299,985	317,606	▼17,621	▼5.5
4	Primorje-Gorski Kotar	265,419	296,195	▼30,776	▼10.4
5	Osijek-Baranja	258,026	305,032	▼47,006	▼15.4
6	Istria	195,237	208,055	▼12,818	▼6.2
7	Zadar	159,766	170,017	▼10,251	▼6.0
8	Varaždin	159,487	175,951	▼16,464	▼9.4
9	Vukovar-Srijem	143,113	179,521	▼36,408	▼20.3
10	Sisak-Moslavina	139,603	172,439	▼32,836	▼19.0
11	Brod-Posavina	130,267	158,575	▼28,308	▼17.9
12	Krapina-Zagorje	120,702	132,892	▼12,190	▼9.2
13	Dubrovnik-Neretva	115,564	122,568	▼7,004	▼5.7
14	Karlovac	112,195	128,899	▼16,704	▼13.0
15	Međimurje	105,250	113,804	▼8,554	▼7.5
16	Bjelovar-Bilogora	101,879	119,764	▼17,885	▼14.9
17	Koprivnica-Križevci	101,221	115,584	▼14,363	▼12.4
18	Šibenik-Knin	96,381	109,375	▼12,994	▼11.9
19	Virovitica-Podravina	70,368	84,836	▼14,468	▼17.1
20	Požega-Slavonia	64,084	78,034	▼13,950	▼17.9
21	Lika-Senj	42,748	50,927	▼8,179	▼16.1
Croatia		3,871,833	4,284,889	▼413,056	▼9.6

== City rankings ==
2021 Census showed decrease of population in all ten biggest cities with Zagreb staying the largest and followed by Split, most populated city in the south, Rijeka, most populated city in the west and Osijek, most populated city in the east.

Rank	City	County	Population	Region
1	Zagreb	City of Zagreb	769,944	City of Zagreb
2	Split	Split-Dalmatia	161,312	Adriatic Croatia
3	Rijeka	Primorje-Gorski Kotar	108,622	Adriatic Croatia
4	Osijek	Osijek-Baranja	96,848	Pannonian Croatia
5	Zadar	Zadar	70,829	Adriatic Croatia
6	Velika Gorica	Zagreb	61,198	Northern Croatia
7	Pula	Istria	52,411	Adriatic Croatia
8	Slavonski Brod	Brod-Posavina	50,039	Pannonian Croatia
9	Karlovac	Karlovac	49,594	Pannonian Croatia
10	Varaždin	Varaždin	43,999	Northern Croatia

== Population by ethnicity and religion ==
Ethnic structure of Croatia in 2021.

Ethnic map of Croatia by municipalities (2021)

Ten biggest nations in Croatia
1. Croats (91.63%)
2. Serbs (3.2%)
3. Bosniaks (0.62%)
4. Roma (0.46%)
5. Albanians (0.36%)
6. Italians (0.36%)
7. Hungarians (0.27%)
8. Czechs (0.2%)
9. Slovenians (0.2%)
10. Slovaks (0.1%)
11. Regional affiliation (0.33%)
12. Declared religion (0.15%)
13. Not classified (0.08%)
14. Not declared (0.58%)
15. Unknown (0.69%)
16. Other (0.77%)

Census information with a number of Croats and 22 official recognized minorities of Croatia.

Ethnicity	Population	Share
Croats	3,547,614	91.63%
Serbs	123,892	3.20%
Bosniaks	24,131	0.62%
Roma	17,980	0.46%
Albanians	13,817	0.36%
Italians	13,763	0.36%
Hungarians	10,315	0.27%
Czechs	7,862	0.20%
Slovenians	7,729	0.20%
Slovaks	3,688	0.10%
Macedonians	3,555	0.09%
Montenegrins	3,127	0.08%
Germans	3,034	0.08%
Ukrainians	1,905	0.05%
Russians	1,481	0.04%
Ruthenians	1,343	0.03%
Poles	657	0.02%
Jews	410	0.01%
Turks	404	0.01%
Austrians	365	0.01%
Romanians	337	0.01%
Bulgarians	262	0.01%
Vlachs	22	0.00%
Others	13,196	0.34%
Regional affiliation	12,712	0.33%
Declared religion	5,874	0.15%
Not classified	3,108	0.08%
Not declared	22,388	0.58%
Unknown	26,862	0.69%

Census also included religion with a connection to nations of Croatia.

Religion/ Ethnicity	Total	Catholics	Orthodox	Protestants	Other Christians	Muslims	Jews	Oriental religions	Other religions, movements and life philosophies	Agnostics and sceptics	Not religious and atheists	Not declared	Unknown
Total	3,871,833	3,057,735	128,395	9,956	186,960	50,981	573	3,392	37,066	64,961	182,188	66,581	83,045
Croats	3,547,614	2,988,051	15,980	5,142	179,159	10,841	301	2,264	33,999	57,216	150,430	51,147	53,084
Albanians	13,817	5,311	11	3	242	7,421	-	4	79	80	235	143	288
Austrians	365	180	7	16	15	4	2	2	9	15	75	19	21
Bosniaks	24,131	255	158	9	37	21,119	-	5	87	367	1,113	407	574
Bulgarians	262	46	114	7	16	3	-	-	4	13	40	10	9
Montenegrins	3,127	257	1,078	10	77	101	-	4	30	251	992	139	188
Czechs	7,862	6,487	12	152	224	-	-	10	53	159	507	128	130
Hungarians	10,315	6,399	64	2,414	325	2	1	5	66	130	453	219	237
Macedonians	3,555	399	1,889	26	133	200	-	6	37	130	479	121	135
Germans	3,034	1,579	36	417	102	18	2	13	20	80	422	149	196
Poles	657	518	2	-	30	-	-	1	10	14	53	14	15
Romani	17,980	10,093	2,406	51	811	3,287	-	3	90	20	245	312	662
Romanians	337	102	114	5	39	4	2	-	4	7	29	7	24
Russians	1,481	173	790	3	49	9	-	4	14	42	229	71	97
Ruthenians	1,343	1,098	40	8	62	-	-	3	6	24	56	16	30
Slovaks	3,688	2,397	11	872	107	1	1	2	23	38	132	60	44
Slovenians	7,729	5,151	32	47	319	13	2	9	62	307	1,186	255	346
Serbs	123,892	2,042	101,250	192	2,076	38	7	67	468	2,342	11,406	1,650	2,354
Italians	13,763	10,027	20	26	767	12	4	16	102	336	1,473	475	505
Turks	404	2	2	-	7	305	-	1	5	8	26	26	22
Ukrainians	1,905	952	574	32	85	1	-	3	9	30	107	42	70
Vlachs	22	3	4	-	-	-	-	1	2	5	7	-	-
Jews	410	9	2	-	5	-	210	1	7	42	97	14	23
Other	13,196	3,088	806	419	508	3,251	29	753	313	481	2,011	770	767
Regional affiliation	12,712	7,967	78	15	558	31	1	45	345	591	2,098	473	510
Declared religion	5,874	475	1,266	6	79	3,436	-	5	55	64	243	100	145
Not classified	3,108	238	50	15	104	19	1	64	698	351	1,115	301	152
Not declared	22,388	1,999	1,131	44	741	615	4	71	355	1,565	6,012	9,368	483
Unknown	26,862	2,437	468	25	283	250	6	30	114	253	917	145	21,934

== Population by first language ==
Croatian citizens by first language, including non-official recognized Serbo-Croatian and Croato-Serbian:

Language	Population	Share
Croatian	3,687,735	95,25%
Serbian	45,004	1,16%
Bosnian	17,531	0,45%
Romani	15,269	0,39%
Albanian	13,503	0,35%
Italian	12,890	0,33%
Serbo-Croatian	8,182	0,21%
Slovenian	7,620	0,20%
Hungarian	7,218	0,19%
Czech	4,915	0,13%
Croato-Serbian	4,278	0,11%
German	3,358	0,09%
Macedonian	3,334	0,09%
Slovak	2,859	0,07%
Russian	2,081	0,05%
Ukrainian	1,198	0,03%
Ruthenian	1,011	0,03%
Montenegrin	943	0,02%
Polish	730	0,02%
Romanian	671	0,02%
Turkish	368	0,01%
Bulgarian	263	0,01%
Hebrew	82	0,00%
Vlach (Romanian or Istro-Romanian)	40	0,00%
Others	9,910	0,26%
Unknown	20,840	0,54%

== Population by sex and age structure ==
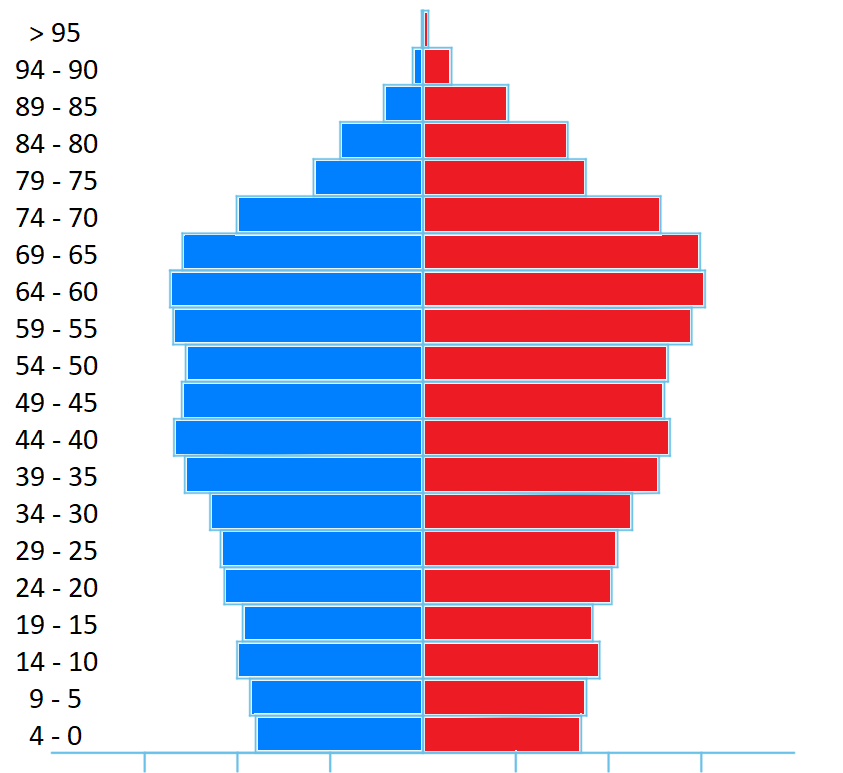
Population pyramid of 2021 Croatian Census

Sex and age structure of the population of Croatia:

Age and sex	All	Men	Women
Total	3,871,833	1,865,129	2,006,704
0–4	175,535	90,245	85,290
5–9	181,445	93,311	88,134
10–14	195,436	100,216	95,220
15–19	188,729	97,228	91,501
20–24	208,852	107,102	101,750
25–29	214,023	109,139	104,884
30–34	227,551	114,778	112,773
35–39	255,617	128,398	127,219
40–44	267,349	134,213	133,136
45–49	260,146	130,035	130,111
50–54	260,056	127,953	132,103
55–59	279,504	134,655	144,849
60–65	288,351	136,338	152,013
66–69	279,106	129,728	149,378
70–74	228,612	100,506	128,106
75–79	146,855	59,065	87,790
80–84	122,719	44,672	78,047
85–89	67,249	21,206	46,043
90–94	21,019	5,604	15,415
>95	3,679	737	2,942
