= Petrova Gora =

Mountain in central Croatia

- Location within Croatia

Highest point
- Elevation: 512 m (1,680 ft)
- Coordinates: 45°18′40″N 15°48′29″E

Geography
- Location: Croatia

Petrova Gora (Croatian: Peter's Hill) is a mountain in the Kordun region of central Croatia. It is administratively part of the Karlovac County and the Sisak-Moslavina County. It extends northeast-southwest, some 25 kilometers along the border with Bosnia and Herzegovina.

== Etymology ==
In the past, the mountain was called as Slatska Gora until 1445, and only from 1536 as Petrova Gora. The latter name was in honor of the Croatian King Petar Snačić who died in the Battle of Gvozd Mountain. The traditional Croatian historiography erroneously identified the Gvozd Mountain with Petrova Gora, as the more probable location of the battle was in the Mala Kapela mountain pass of central Croatia.

== Geology ==
It is an old geological formation, which means that it is relatively rich in water and especially in forest vegetation. This also implies a certain mountaineering restraint because it lacks broad visibility, but there is also a large identification of reliefs with numerous significant reefs and deep ravines enriched with numerous streams. It composed of Paleozoic and Mesozoic rocks.

== Hilltop monument ==
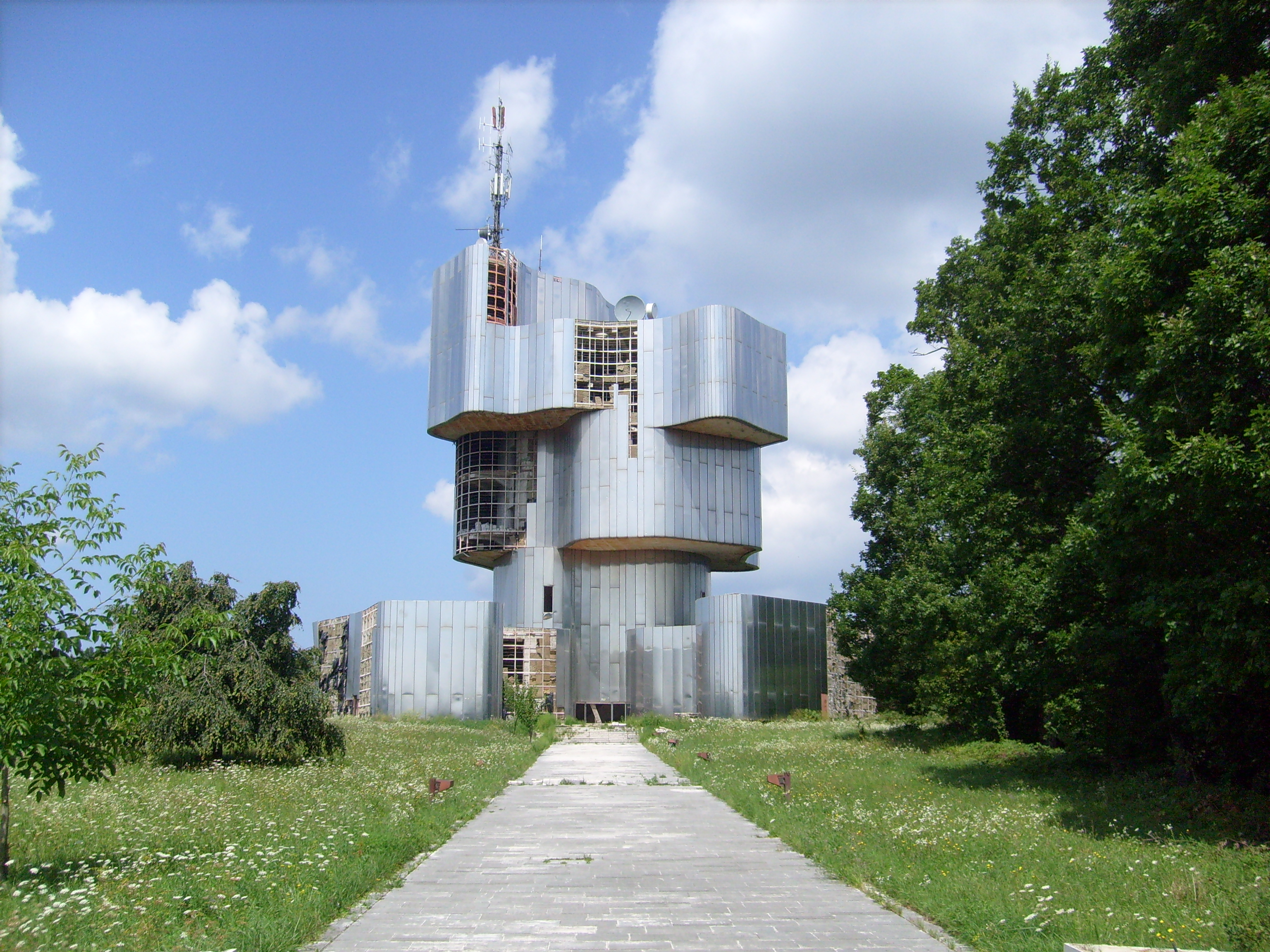
Monument to the uprising of the people of Kordun and Banija

The foundation stone for the Monument to the uprising of the people of Kordun and Banija on Mali Petrovac was laid on 6 May 1946, but construction began only after 34 years, in mid 1980, according to the original plans of the Croatian Serb sculptor Vojin Bakić. The monument was unveiled on October 4, 1981. The monument is a masterpiece of monumental commemorative sculpture of its time and highlights the role of Petrova Gora in the antifascist struggle in this region.

== Bibliography ==
- Poljak, Željko (February 1959). "Zrinjska i Petrova gora". Kazalo za "Hrvatski planinar" i "Naše planine" 1898—1958 (PDF). Naše planine. Vol. XI. p. 8. ISSN 0354-0650.
