= Pannonian Croatia (NUTS-2) =

Pannonian Croatia Panonska Hrvatska
- Region
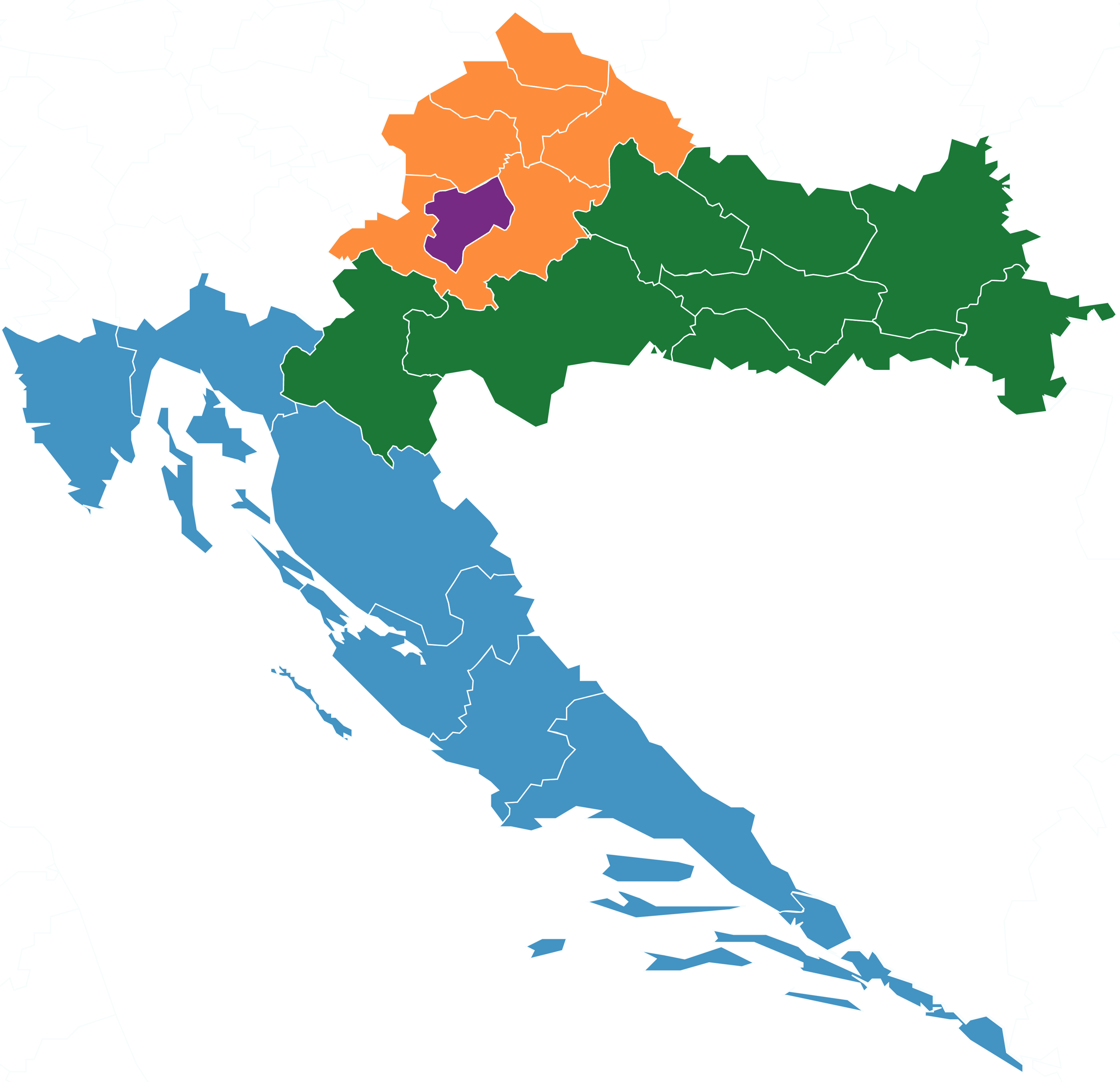
- The region marked in green is referred to as HR02 Pannonian Croatia
- Country: Croatia

Area
  - Total: 23,220 km^{2} (8,970 sq mi)

Population (2020 estimate)
  - Total: 1,053,690
  - Density: 45.38/km^{2} (117.5/sq mi)

GDP
  - Total: €14.810 billion (2024)
  - Per capita: €15,081 (2024)
- NUTS code: HR02

Pannonian Croatia (Croatian: Panonska Hrvatska) is a subdivision of Croatia as defined by the Nomenclature of Territorial Units for Statistics (NUTS). It is one of the four classified NUTS-2 statistical regions of Croatia. The region incorporates the eastern parts of the country. It encompasses an area of 23,220 km^{2} (8,970 sq mi), and includes eight counties. With a population of over 1.05 million, it is the second most populated of the all the regions in Croatia.

== Classification ==
The country of Croatia has been organized into 20 counties (apart from the capital of Zagreb) for administrative purposes by the County Territories Act of 1997. The Nomenclature of Territorial Units for Statistics (NUTS) organizes the country into four broader level sub-divisions. These are classified as a NUTS-2 statistical regions of Croatia, and incorporate one or more counties within it. The counties form the NUTS-3 territorial units under them. Pannonic Croatia incorporates seven such counties.

== Geography ==
Pannonian Croatia incorporates the southern parts of the country in continental Europe. Encompassing an area of 14,197 km^{2} (5,481 sq mi), it is completely land-locked. It shares an international land border with Bosnia and Herzegovina in the south, and is bordered by Adriatic Croatia to the west, and Northern Croatia to the north.

The Pannonian Croatian region has a warm and humid climate. Summers are warmer with average temperatures of 22 °C (72 °F) and winters are cooler with average temperatures of −1 °C (30 °F). The temperature raises and precipitation levels fall while traversing from west to east due to altitude changes. The Pannonian region consists of vast plains, watered by rivers and lakes.

== See also ==
- NUTS statistical regions of Croatia
