= Mala Kapela =

- Location within Croatia

Highest point
- Elevation: 1,279 m (4,196 ft)
- Coordinates: 44°54′N 15°31′E

Geography
- Location: Croatia
- Parent range: Dinaric Alps

Mala Kapela (pronounced [mâːlaː kǎpɛla], lit. Small Chapel) is a mountain range in Croatia, part of the Dinaric Alps. It stretches in the direction northwest–southeast, and it extends from the mountain pass called "Kapela" or "Vrh Kapele" (alt. 887 m), that separates it from Velika Kapela, down to the mountain pass that connects Otočac and Plitvice and from then on to Plješevica. The highest peak is Seliški vrh at 1279 meters, located in the southern part of the mountain. The Mala Kapela Tunnel goes through the northern section of the mountain.

== Etymology ==
In the past, the mountain pass until 1522 was known as Iron Mountain (Alpes ferreae), Gvozd (Gozdia) and Petrov Gvozd (Peturgoz) when due to the chapel of St. Nikola (previously St. Mikula) the population started to call it as Kapela. The pass is considered to have been the place where Croatian King Petar Snačić died in the Battle of Gvozd Mountain (1097), which was previously erroneously identified with Petrova Gora.

== Bibliography ==
- Šašić, Martina; Nahirnić, Ana; Tarmann, Gerhard M. (2016-12-31). "Zygaenidae (Lepidoptera) in the Lepidoptera collections of the Croatian Natural History Museum". Natura Croatica: Periodicum Musei Historiae Naturalis Croatici. 25 (2): 233–248. doi:10.20302/NC.2016.25.19. eISSN 1848-7386.
