= Adriatic Croatia =

Adriatic Croatia Jadranska Hrvatska
- Region
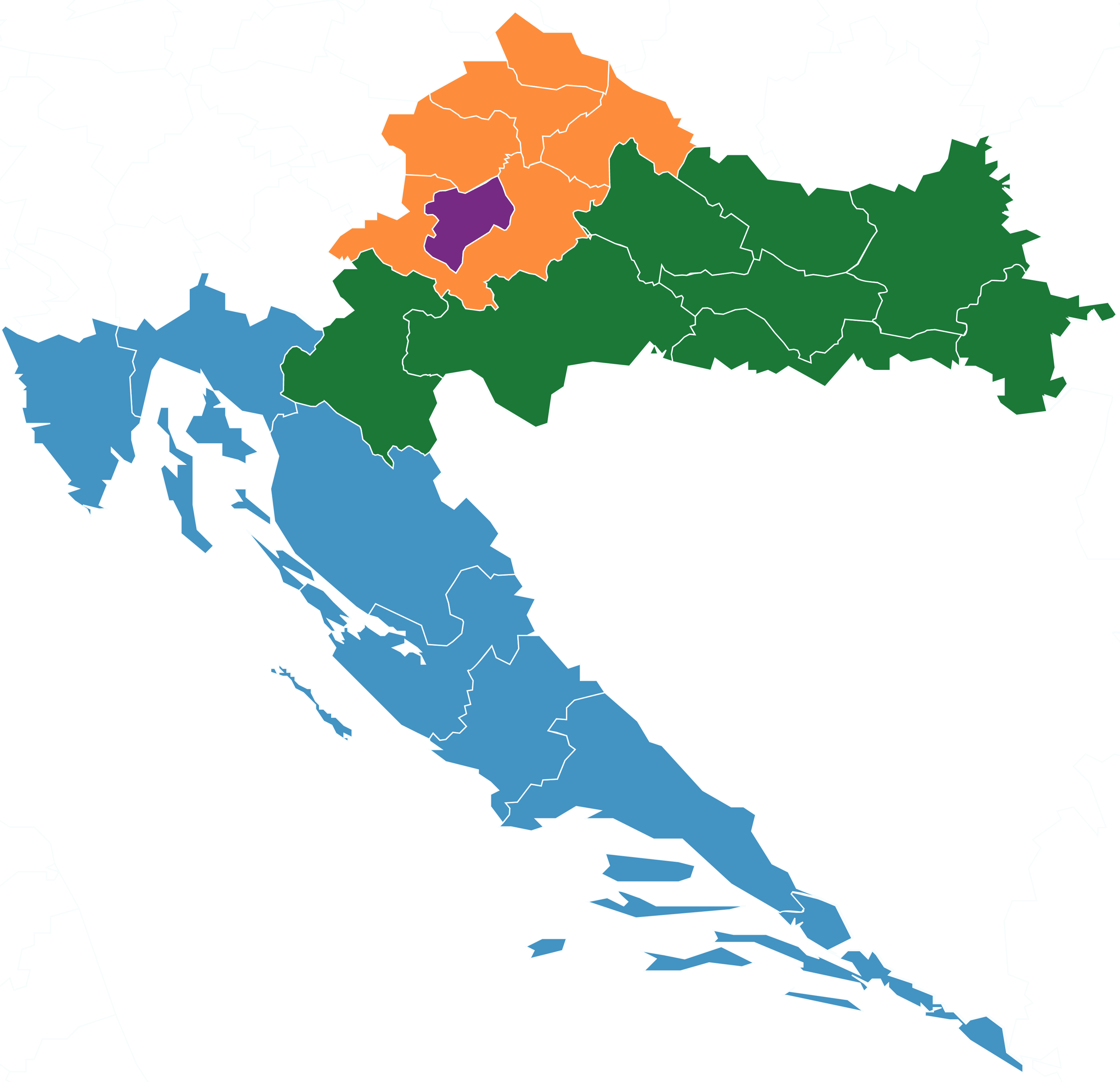
- Adriatic Croatia in blue

- Location within Croatia Location within Balkans
- Country: Croatia

Area
  - Total: 24,705 km^{2} (9,539 sq mi)

Population (2025)
  - Total: 1,322,482
  - Density: 53.531/km^{2} (138.64/sq mi)

GDP
  - Total: €27.579 billion (2024)
  - Per capita: €20,900 (2024)
  - Per capita PPS: €29,200 (2024)
- NUTS code: HR03

Adriatic Croatia (Croatian: Jadranska Hrvatska) is a subdivision of Croatia as defined by the Nomenclature of Territorial Units for Statistics (NUTS). It is one of the four classified NUTS-2 statistical regions of Croatia. The region incorporates the western parts of the country along the Adriatic Sea. It encompasses an area of 24,705 km^{2} (9,539 sq mi), and includes the counties–Lika-Senj, Primorje-Gorski Kotar, Dubrovnik-Neretva, Zadar, Split-Dalmatia, Istria, and Šibenik-Knin. With a population of over 1.3 million, it is the most populated of the all the regions in Croatia.

== Classification ==
The country of Croatia has been organized into 20 counties (apart from the capital of Zagreb) for administrative purposes by the County Territories Act of 1997. The Nomenclature of Territorial Units for Statistics (NUTS) organizes the country into four broader level sub-divisions. These are classified as a NUTS-2 statistical regions of Croatia, and incorporate one or more counties within it. The counties form the NUTS-3 territorial units under them.

== Geography ==
Adriatic Croatia incorporates the western parts of the country, along the Adriatic Sea. Encompassing an area of 14,197 km^{2} (5,481 sq mi), it has a 1,777 km (1,104 mi) coastline. It shares an international land border with Slovenia in the north, and is bordered by Pannonian Croatia to the east.

The Adriatic Croatian region has a Mediterranean climate. It is characterized by hot, dry summers, and rainy winters. During summers, there is lower precipitation, and heat waves result in sudden temperature rises. The region is also subject to erratic climate conditions. There is sparse vegetation, with low ground water, and thin soil. The coastal regions are heavily eroded. Due to its proximity to the sea, the region is low-lying, and is in the danger of flooding due to rising sea levels.

=== Sub-regions ===
Adriatic Croatia incorporates the counties of Lika-Senj, Primorje-Gorski Kotar, Dubrovnik-Neretva, Zadar, Split-Dalmatia, Istria, and Šibenik-Knin.

County	Seat	Regions	Area (2006)	Population (2021)	Arms	Geographic coordinates
Dubrovnik-Neretva	Dubrovnik	Dalmatia	1,781 km^{2} (688 sq mi)	115,564	Coat of arms of Dubrovnik-Neretva County	42°39′13″N 18°05′41″E
Istria	Pazin	Istria	2,813 km^{2} (1,086 sq mi)	195,237	Coat of arms of Istria County	45°14′21″N 13°56′19″E
Lika-Senj	Gospić	Central Croatia and Dalmatia	5,353 km^{2} (2,067 sq mi)	42,748	Coat of arms of Lika-Senj County	44°42′25″N 15°10′27″E
Primorje-Gorski Kotar	Rijeka	Central Croatia, Dalmatia and Istria	3,588 km^{2} (1,385 sq mi)	265,419	Coat of arms of Primorje-Gorski Kotar County	45°27′14″N 14°35′38″E
Split-Dalmatia	Split	Dalmatia	4,540 km^{2} (1,750 sq mi)	423,407	Coat of arms of Split-Dalmatia County	43°10′0″N 16°30′0″E
Šibenik-Knin	Šibenik	Dalmatia	2,984 km^{2} (1,152 sq mi)	96,381	Coat of arms of Šibenik-Knin County	43°55′44″N 16°3′43″E
Zadar	Zadar	Central Croatia and Dalmatia	3,646 km^{2} (1,408 sq mi)	159,766	Coat of arms of Zadar County	44°1′5″N 15°53′42″E

== Demographics ==
With a population of over 1.3 million, it is the most populated of the all the regions in Croatia. Agriculture, livestock and fisheries form a major part of the economy of the region. In 2021, the region had about 441,105 ha (1,089,990 acres) of land under cultivation. Major produce include vegetables, citrus fruits, olives, and grapes. The region has about 84% of the grasslands in the country, and is used for livestock rearing.

== Economy ==
The economy of Adriatic Croatia is dominated by the service sector, particularly tourism, which accounts for a substantial share of regional economic activity. The region generated a GDP of €27.6 billion in 2024, equivalent to 32.1% of Croatia's total GDP, with a GDP per capita of €20,900. Besides tourism, important industries include maritime transport, shipbuilding, fisheries, food processing, and agriculture, particularly olive growing and viticulture. Major ports at Rijeka, Zadar, Split, and Ploče play a key role in Croatia's maritime trade, while the region's economy remains characterized by strong seasonal fluctuations due to its dependence on tourism. IN 2024, GDP per capita in purchasing power standards (PPS) amounted to €29,200, equivalent to 73% of the European Union average.

=== GDP in sub-regions ===
County	Nominal GDP (2024) million EUR	Nominal GDP per capita (2024)	GDP PPS per capita (2024)	GDP PPS per capita (2024) as % of EU average
Dubrovnik-Neretva	2,553.31	22,000	30,700	77
Istria	5,082.15	24,900	34,800	87
Lika-Senj	810.95	18,800	26,300	66
Primorje-Gorski Kotar	6,687.73	25,200	35,200	88
Split-Dalmatia	7,803.49	18,100	25,400	64
Šibenik-Knin	1,646.54	17,200	24,000	60
Zadar	2,994.59	18,100	25,300	63

== See also ==
- NUTS statistical regions of Croatia
