= Narodne novine =

Government gazette of Croatia

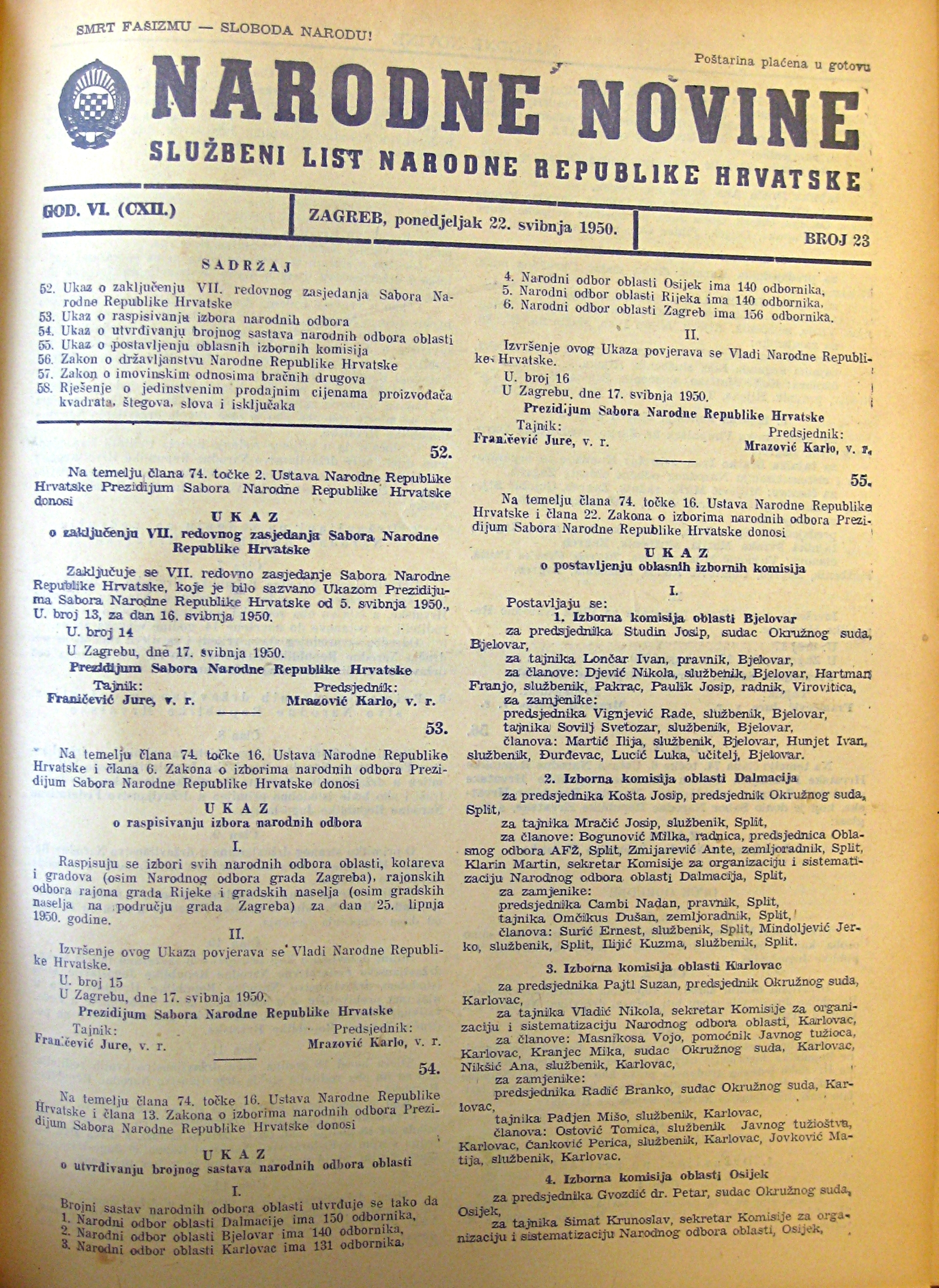
- Narodne novine, May 22, 1950
- Type: Official gazette
- Owner: Croatia
- Publisher: Narodne novine d.d.
- Founded: 6 January 1835; 191 years ago
- Language: Croatian
- Headquarters: Savski gaj XIII. 6, Zagreb, Croatia

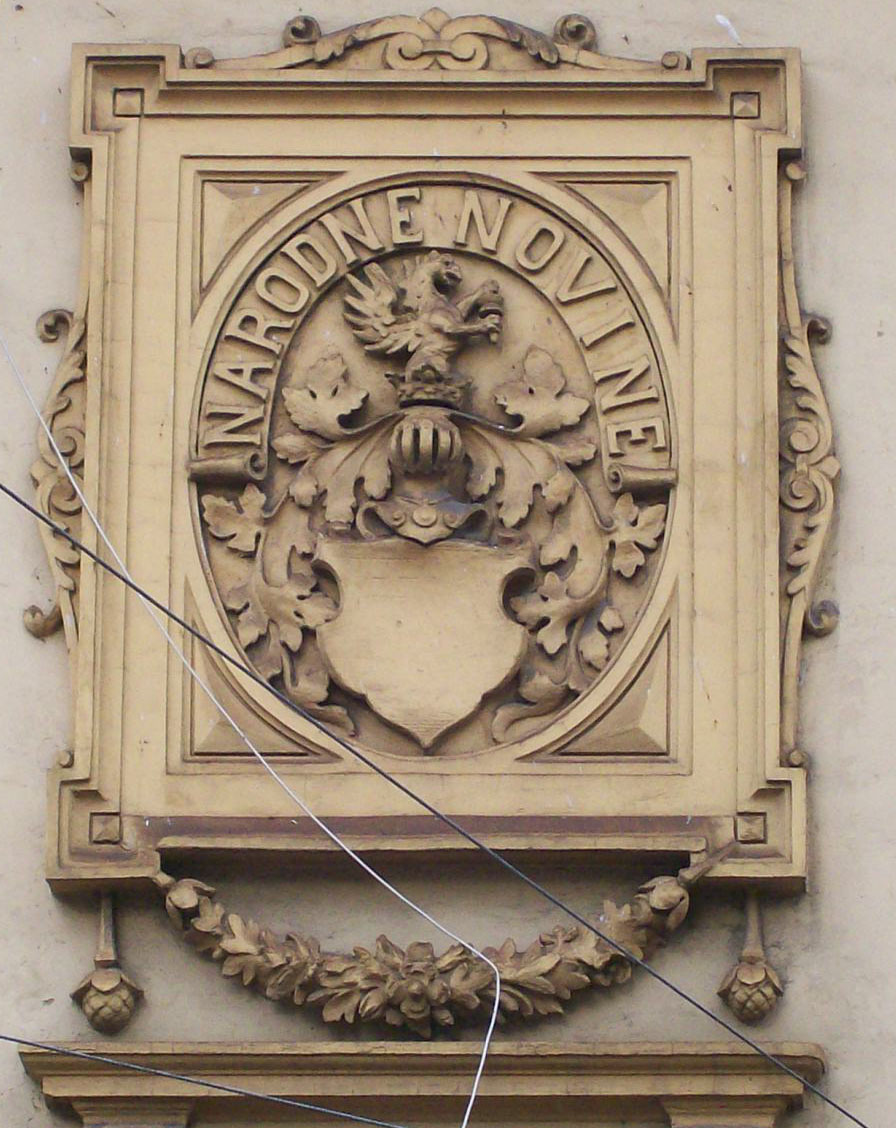
A relief of Narodne novine in Frankopanska street in Zagreb

Narodne novine (lit. 'The People's Newspaper') is the official gazette (or newspaper of public record) of the Republic of Croatia which publishes laws, regulations, appointments and official decisions and releases them in the public domain. It is published by the eponymous public company.

The Narodne novine started as the Novine Horvatzke ('Croatian Newspaper'), first published on 6 January 1835, by Ljudevit Gaj, who created and printed the paper. The first usage of the term "Narodne novine" was in 1843, but the paper changed several names over the years, usually according to the name of the state that Croatia was part of.

Gaj sold the original publishing company to the government in 1868. The current incarnation of the company was officially founded in 1952. In 2001 the company became a public company (Croatian: dioničko društvo).

The Narodne novine as the official gazette of the Republic of Croatia promulgates acts, laws and other rules and regulations of the Croatian Parliament, bylaws of the Croatian Government and also Decrees of the President of Croatia. On publication, legislation begins a brief period (usually 8 days) known as vacatio legis, allowing it to become widely known before taking legal effect.
