= D5 road (Croatia) =

Road in Croatia

D5 state road

Route information
- Part of
- Length: 123.1 km (76.5 mi)

Major junctions
- From: Terezino Polje border crossing to Hungary
- D2 in Virovitica; D28 in Veliki Zdenci; D45 in Veliki Zdenci; D26 in Daruvar; D38 in Pakrac; D45 in Lipik; A3 in Okučani interchange
- To: Stara Gradiška border crossing to Bosnia and Herzegovina

Location
- Country: Croatia
- Counties: Virovitica-Podravina, Bjelovar-Bilogora, Požega-Slavonia, Brod-Posavina
- Major cities: Virovitica, Daruvar, Pakrac, Lipik

Highway system
- Highways in Croatia

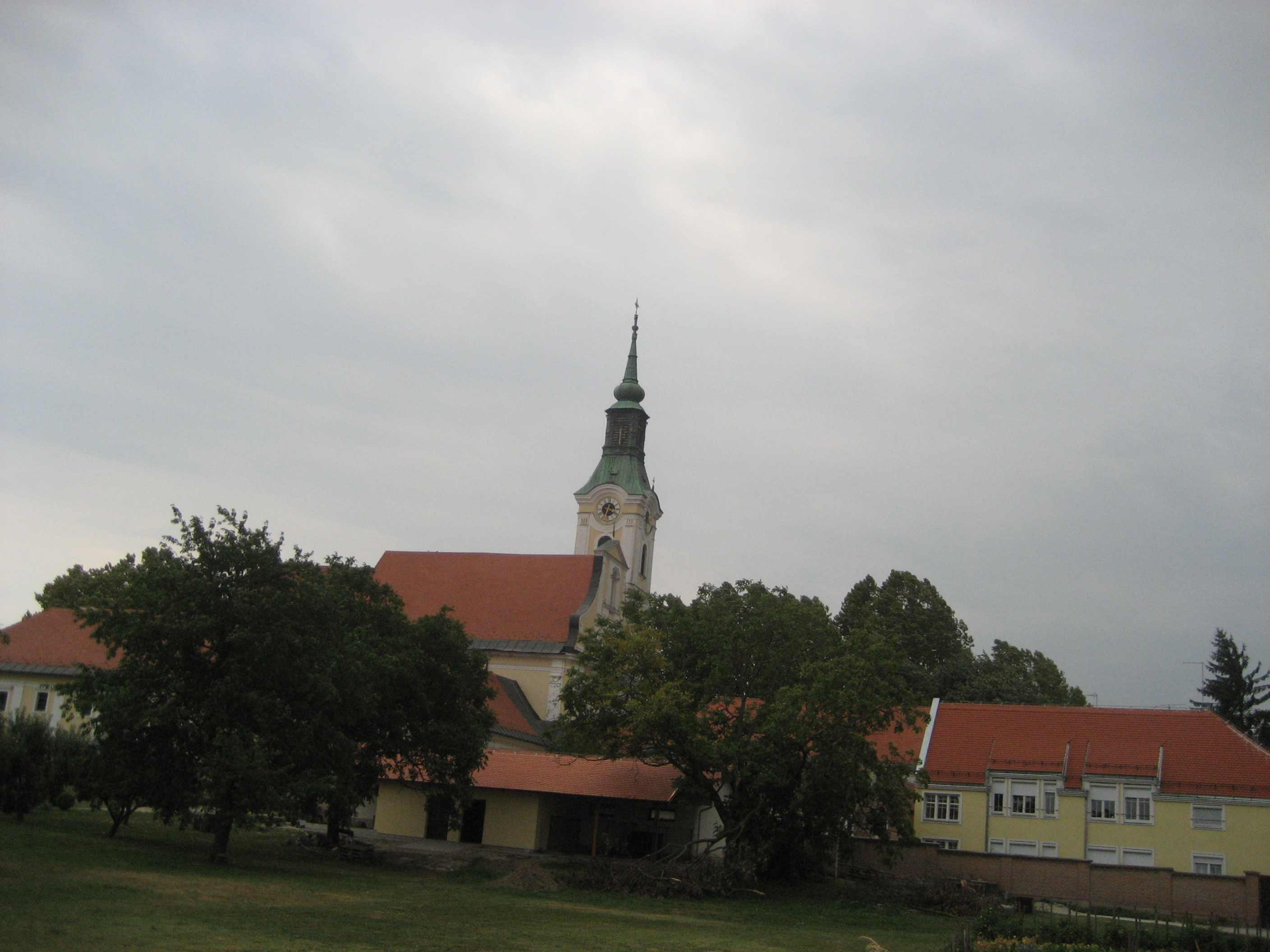
Virovitica, on the D5 route

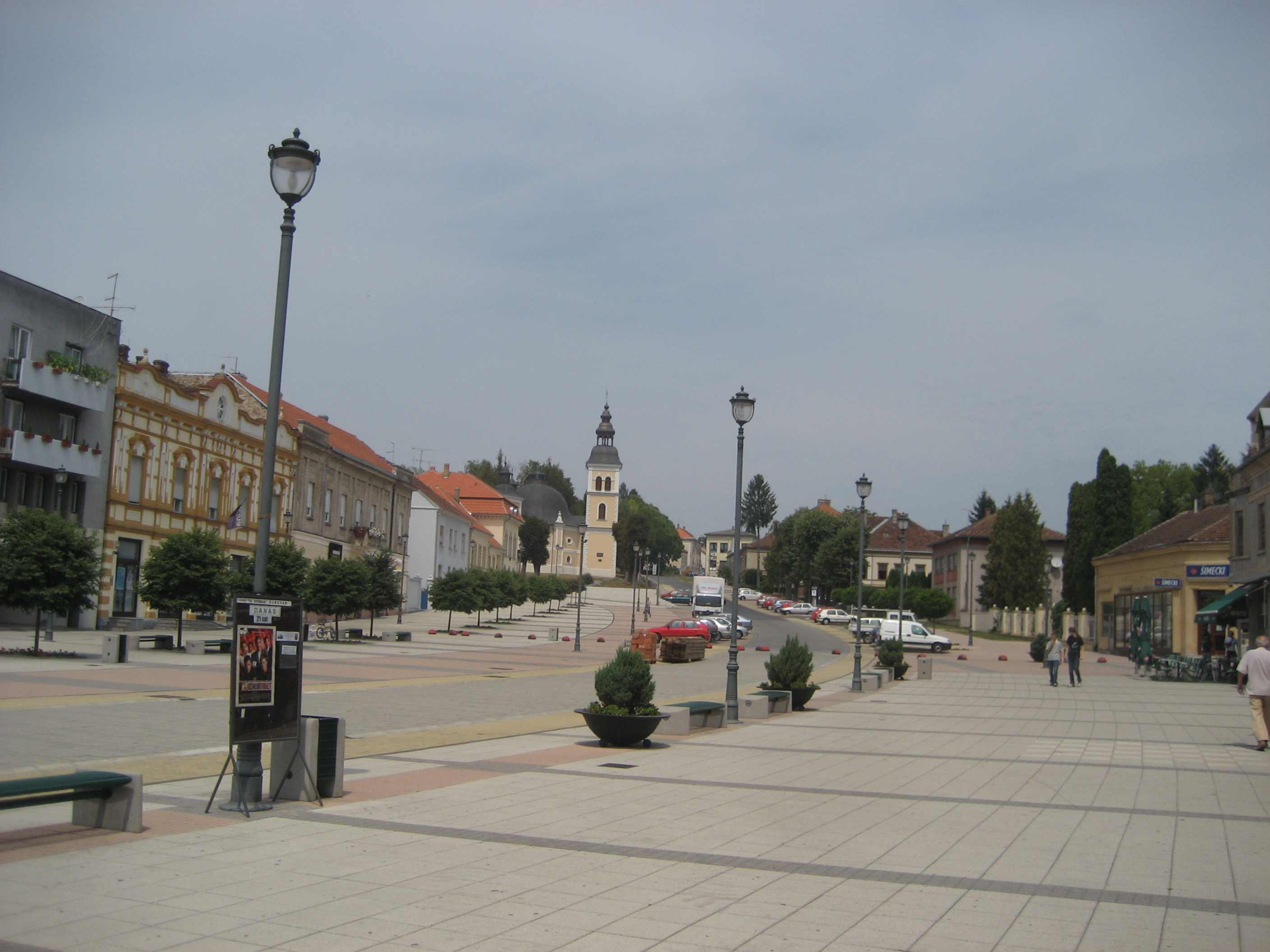
Daruvar, on the D5 route

D5 is a state road in the eastern Croatia the A3 motorway Okučani interchange to a number of cities in the western Slavonia region, including Pakrac and Daruvar, as well as to Drava River valley city of Virovitica. The road also links international border crossings Terezino Polje and Stara Gradiška providing access to Barcs, Hungary and Bosanska Gradiška, Bosnia and Herzegovina respectively. The road is 123.1 km (76.5 mi) long.

The road, as well as all other state roads in Croatia, is managed and maintained by Hrvatske ceste, a state-owned company.

== Traffic volume ==
Traffic is regularly counted and reported by Hrvatske ceste, operator of the road.

D5 traffic volume
Road	Counting site	AADT	ASDT	Notes
D5	2202 Terezino Polje	760	1,071	Adjacent to the Ž4004 junction.
D5	2214 Virovitica bypass north	780	974	Between the D2 and the Ž4249 junctions.
D5	2215 Virovitica bypass south	1,296	1,580	Between the D2 and the Ž4251 junctions.
D5	2205 Grubišno Polje	2,917	3,011	Between the Ž3094 and the Ž3139 junctions.
D5	2206 Končanica west	2,484	2,580	Adjacent to the Ž3138 junction.
D5	2210 Kip	1,853	2,167	Adjacent to the Ž3171 junction.
D5	2213 Badljevina	2,178	2,278	Adjacent to the Ž3272 junction.
D5	3411 Lipik	4,722	5,018	Adjacent to the D47 junction.
D5	3406 Cage	1,451	1,497	Adjacent to the Ž3252 junction.
D5	3412 Okučani	3,592	3,918	Between the Ž3241 and the Ž4158 junctions.
D5	3410 Stara Gradiška	3,470	4,140	Between the Ž4226 and the Ž4227 junctions.The AADT figure estimated by Hrvatske ceste.

== Road junctions and populated areas ==
D5 junctions/populated areas
Type	Slip roads/Notes
	Terezino Polje border crossing to Hungary; Route 6 to Barcs, Hungary. The northern terminus of the road.
	Terezino Polje
	Gornje Bazje; Ž4004 to Veliko Polje.
	Kapela Dvor; Ž4009 to Turanovac.
	Lukač; Ž4007 to Rogovac (D2) and Gradina.
	Virovitica; D2 to Pitomača, Koprivnica and Varaždin (to the west) and to Slatina, Našice and Osijek (to the east).
	Lončarica
	Velika Dapčevica
	Grubišno Polje; Ž3094 to Veliki Grđevac (D28) and Ivanovo Selo.
	Orlovac Zdenački; Ž3139 to Grbavac
	Mali Zdenci
	Veliki Zdenci; D28 to Bjelovar and D10 expressway Gradec interchange . D45 Garešnica, Kutina and A3 motorway Kutina interchange.
	Končanica; Ž3138 to D26 state road.
	Donji Daruvar; Ž3301 to Đulovac Suhopolje (D2).
	Daruvar; D26 to Dežanovac, Garešnica, Čazma and D10 expressway Dubrava interchange. Ž3170 to Vrbovac and Markovac. Ž3287 within Daruvar itself.
	Ž3172 to Doljani and Sirač.
	Ž3171 to Šibovac.
	Kip
	Badljevina; Ž3169 to Trojeglava. Ž3272 to Sirač.
	Ž3291 to Dereza, Sirač and Pakrani.
	Ž4097 to Gornja Obrijež and Donja Obrijež.
	Pakrac; D38 to Požega (D51), Pleternica (D49) and Đakovo (D7). Ž4098 to Prekopakra. Ž4099 to Šeovica.
	Lipik; D47 to Novska, A3 motorway Novska interchange, Hrvatska Dubica, Hrvatska Kostajnica and Dvor (D6).
	Donji Čaglić
	Bjelanovac
	Bijela Stijena
	Benkovac
	Cage
	Okučani; Ž3252 to Novska (D312). Ž4153 to Vrbovljani. Ž4158 to Nova Gradiška, Staro Petrovo Selo and Batrina (D49). Ž4241 to Okučani railway station (M105 railway).
	Dubovac
	A3 in Okučani interchange to Zagreb (to the west) and to Slavonski Brod (to the east).
	Novi Varoš
	Ž4226 to Stara Gradiška and Gornji Varoš.
	Ž4227 to Donji Varoš.
	Stara Gradiška border crossing to Bosnia and Herzegovina; Route M-16 to Bosanska Gradiška, Bosnia and Herzegovina. The southern terminus of the road.
