= RIT (disambiguation) =

RIT is a common abbreviated name for Rochester Institute of Technology in Rochester, New York, USA.

RIT or rit may also refer to:

== Business ==
- Recherche et Industrie Thérapeutiques, the former name of what is now GlaxoSmithKline Biologicals in Belgium
- Rede Internacional de Televisão, a Brazilian religious television channel
- RiT Technologies, a company specializing in structured cabling management systems
- Rothschild Investment Trust, now RIT Capital Partners, a large British investment trust
- Rit Dye, a household clothing dye manufactured by Phoenix Brands

== Education ==
- Rajiv Gandhi Institute of Technology, Kottayam
- Royal Institute of Thailand, the office of Royal Society of Thailand
- Rochester Institute of Technology, a private research university in the town of Henrietta in the Rochester, New York metropolitan area

== Medicine ==
- Radioimmunotherapy, radioisotope therapy with monoclonal antibodies
- Radioisotope therapy, a form of radiation therapy
- Rit (protein), a member of the ras superfamily of proteins

== Music ==
- Recording Industry Foundation in Taiwan, the organization representing the music industry in Taiwan
- Rit (album), a 1981 album by Lee Ritenour
- Rit's House, a 2002 album by Lee Ritenour
- rit., abbreviation for ritardando or ritenuto

== Transit ==
- Rede Integrada de Transporte, a bus rapid transit system in Curitiba, Brazil
- Riffelalp tram (RiT), a mountain tram line near Zermatt, Switzerland
- Roosevelt Island Tramway, a tram connecting Manhattan and Roosevelt Island in New York City

== Places ==
- Rit, Croatia, a village near Lukač
- Kopački Rit, a nature park in eastern Croatia
- Jabučki Rit, a suburb of Belgrade, Serbia
- Glogonjski Rit, a suburb of Belgrade, Serbia

== Other uses ==
- Rapid intervention team, firefighter assist and search team

== See also ==
- Ritt
- Reet (disambiguation)
- Writ (disambiguation)
