= 16th Krajina Motorized Brigade =

- 16. крајишка моторизована бригада
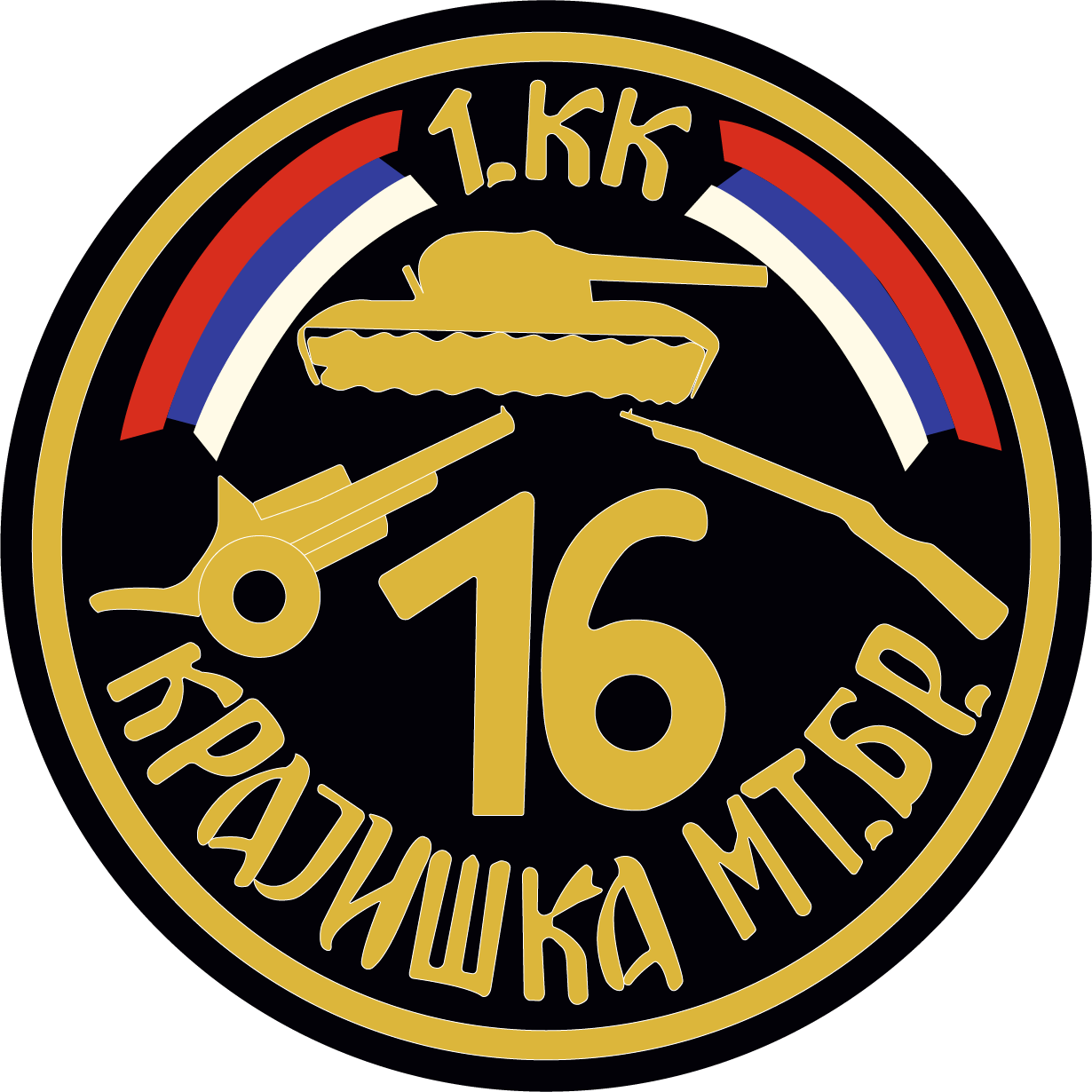
- Badge of the 16th Krajina Motorized Brigade
- Active: 1942–1945; Postwar; 1990s
- Country: Socialist Federal Republic of Yugoslavia; Republika Srpska (1992–95)
- Branch: Ground forces
- Type: Motorized brigade
- Size: 23,000 (peak); 12,000 (1995)
- Part of: 1st Krajina Corps
- Garrison/HQ: Banja Luka
- Nickname: 16. garava
- Engagements: Bosnian War: Operation Corridor 92; Operation Sadejstvo; Operation Drina 93; Operation Vaganj 95
- Decorations: Order of Nemanjići

Commanders
- Commander: Milan Čeleketić
- Ceremonial chief: Novica Simić
- Colonel of the Regiment: Vukadin Makagić
- Command Sergeant Major: Vlado Topić

Insignia
- Badge of the Army of Republika Srpska

The 16th Krajina Motorized Brigade (Serbian: 16. Крајишка моторизована бригада; 16. Krajiška motorizovana brigada) was a motorized unit based in Banja Luka part of the 1st Krajina Corps of the Army of Republika Srpska.

== History ==
The 16th Krajina Brigade was the successor of the Krajina Strike Proletarian Brigade (Serbian: Крајишка ударна пролетерска бригада; Krajiška udarna proleterska brigada), established in 1942 by Yugoslav Partisans in the village of Lamovita near Prijedor, Bosnia. After the second world war the brigade was re-established in Travnik and later moved to Banja Luka as the 16th Regiment. In 1985 the 16th Krajina Regiment was renamed 16th Krajina Brigade. In the late 1980s it became part of the 5th (Banja Luka) Corps of the First Military Region (Yugoslavia).

With the Breakup of Yugoslavia, the brigade entered into service with the Army of Republika Srpska.

== Order of Battle (1992-1995) ==
- 1st Motorized Battalion
- 2nd Motorized Battalion
- 3rd Motorized Battalion
- Armored Battalion
- Mixed anti-tank artillery battalion
- Artillery Battalion (122 mm howitzer)
- Reconnaissance company
- Military Police company
- Signals company
- Light Air Defense Battalion
- Engineer Battalion
- Rear Echelon Battalion
- NBC Platoon

== Yugoslav Wars ==
=== War in Slavonia ===
The decision to mobilize the 16th Krajina Brigade was made after the Yugoslav government decided to intervene after the declaration of independence by Croatia. As such, between 13 June 13 and 15 August, 1991 the brigade conducted mobilization activities and preparatory exercises were in the villages of Mašići, Han Šibić, and Berek.

As ordered, on 16 September 1991 the first elements of the brigade crossed the Sava River into the Socialist Republic of Croatia near Gradiška joining the 329th JNA Armored Brigade (later the 1st Armored Brigade). In their first action, the soldiers of the 16th Krajina Brigade took the villages of Donja Varoš, Gornja Varoš, Nova Varoš and broke into the Brotherhood and Unity Highway. The next day, with the first few wounded, and the first soldier of the 16th Brigade killed was Bojan Majstorovic.

After a few days, the rest of the brigade crossed the Sava River and in a rush took over settlements in the direction of Kosovac–Gornji Bogicevci, Nova Varoš–Donji Bogicevci, and then the villages of Gornji Rajici, Rozdanik, Jazavica, Voćarica, Paklenica, and part of Stari Grabovac.

Under the command of then commander Milan Čeleketić, the 16th Brigade took over 65 km2 of the territory of Western Slavonia, which was mostly inhabited by the Serbian population.

=== War in Bosnia ===
In the spring of 1992, a portion of the brigade returned to Banja Luka, and several troops were deployed to Mount Vlašić. By the end of May 1992, a new mobilization was carried out near Mount Manjača were 1,500 new troops were added to the brigade. In 1992, a smaller element of the brigade was deployed to the Republic of Serbian Krajina, with a larger portion deploying to Posavina by the 1st Krajina Corps to take part in Operation Corridor. The VRS tasked the 1st Krajina Corps with the main effort of the offensive, organized into four Tactical Groups, the 16th Krajina Motorized Brigade, and Operational Group Doboj. In mid–June 1992, the 16th Brigade systematically liberated villages from Doboj to Modriča (Johovac, Galići, Gornja Foča, Karamatići, Lušići, Vukovac (partially) and Živkovo Polje (partially). In the afternoon of June 26, 1992, combatants of the 16th Brigade took over the village of Miloševac, and a little later Captain Dmitry Zaric's 2nd Company broke through the last enemy strongholds and merged with the units of the East Bosnian Corps. In this way, a corridor (also known as the Path of Life) between Krajina and Serbia was established. Subsequently, the 16th Brigade participated in the takeover of the territories in Posavina from 3 to 17 July 1992, taking over 13 villages (122 km2 of territory) and breaking out to the Sava River, achieving their mission as directed by VRS headquarters. After breaking out to the Sava River, the 16th Brigade was tasked to defend the Donji Svilaj–Obodni Canal, and portions of the 16th brigade engaged in combat operations near Ostra Luka, at the Gradačac front in order to ensure that the corridor with Serbia was not compromised. During this time, Lieutenant Colonel Milan Čeleketić was replaced by Colonel Novica Simić as brigade commander. Shortly thereafter, VRS command promoted Colonel Simić to general, appointing him commander of the Eastern Bosnia Corps of the Army of Republika Srpska. The new commander of the 16th Brigade become Lieutenant Colonel Vukadin Makagić.

From mid-August to early November 1992, units of the 16th Brigade, under the command of Colonel Slavko Lisica, participated in the takeover of Bosanski Brod. At midnight on October 6, units of the 16th Brigade entered Bosanski Brod again reaching the Sava River.

After the takeover of Bosanski Brod, most of the brigade returned to frontline positions on the Donji Svilaj–Brusnica route, and about a month later the 16th Brigade was tasked to the Oraško front. In late December, the 16th Brigade received Lieutenant Colonel Vlado Topić as commander, and proceeded to the Brčko front in defense of the corridor along with the East Bosnian Corps of the Republika Srpska Army, headed by their former commander Major General Novica Simić. From the beginning of 1993 until the summer of the same year, the 16th Brigade took over 13 populated areas and expanded the corridor between Republika Srpska and Serbia by 33 km2 (as part of Operation Cooperation). Following this action, the brigade took a short break before being moved to the Doboj–Teslić front. This brigade participated in Operation Drina in early 1994.

Following the fall of a number of Krajina municipalities during Operation Maestral 2 in September 1995, as part of Operation Vaganj, the 16th Krajina Motorized Brigade, along with the 43rd Prijedor, 6th Sanska, 5th Kozarska, 65th Protection Regiment and other units returned 5th Corps to the river Una. Prior to entering Bosanska Krupa, the brigade was relocated to the Manjača region, where it was tasked, in cooperation with other units (Serbian Guard, 2nd Krajina Brigade and the Special Police Brigade of the RS MUP), to suppress the 5th ARBiH Corps from Mrkonjić Grad and take overKljuc. In just three days (October 3–6), the 16th Krajina arrived near Kljuc, when the General Staff decided to return the brigade to the Doboj front.

This unit's combat tour lasted 1,727 days between 1992 and 1995, where the brigade lost 437 soldiers, approximately 2,000 wounded and 11 reported missing.

== Decorations ==
The brigade was awarded the Order of Nemanjići, the highest military recognition of Republika Srpska, for its merits in the 1992-95 war, as well as organizing and defending the Serbian state and people.

== Gallery ==
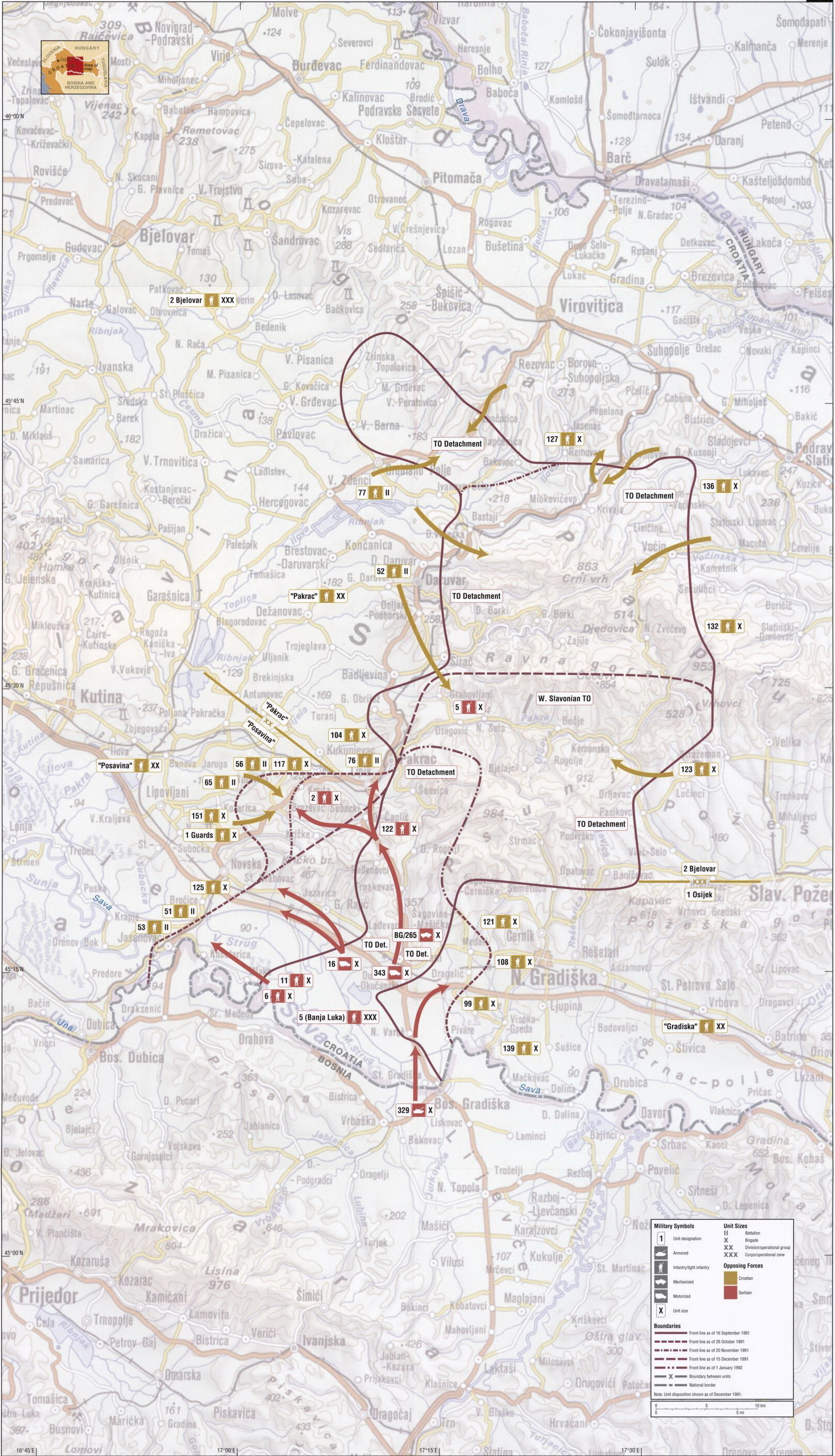
Croatia, Western Slavonia; September 1991 - January 1992

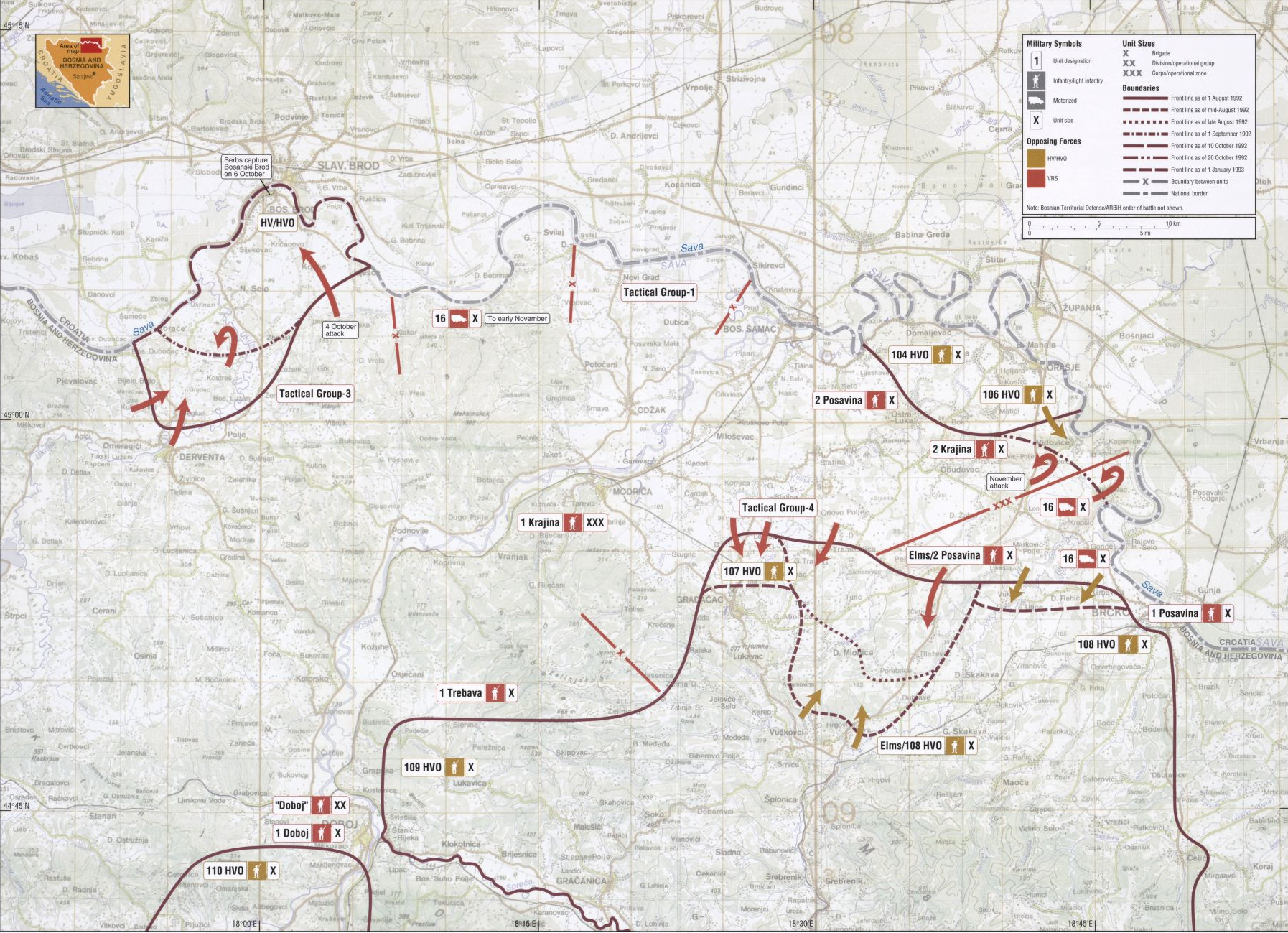
Bosnia, Posavina Corridor; August 1992-January 1993

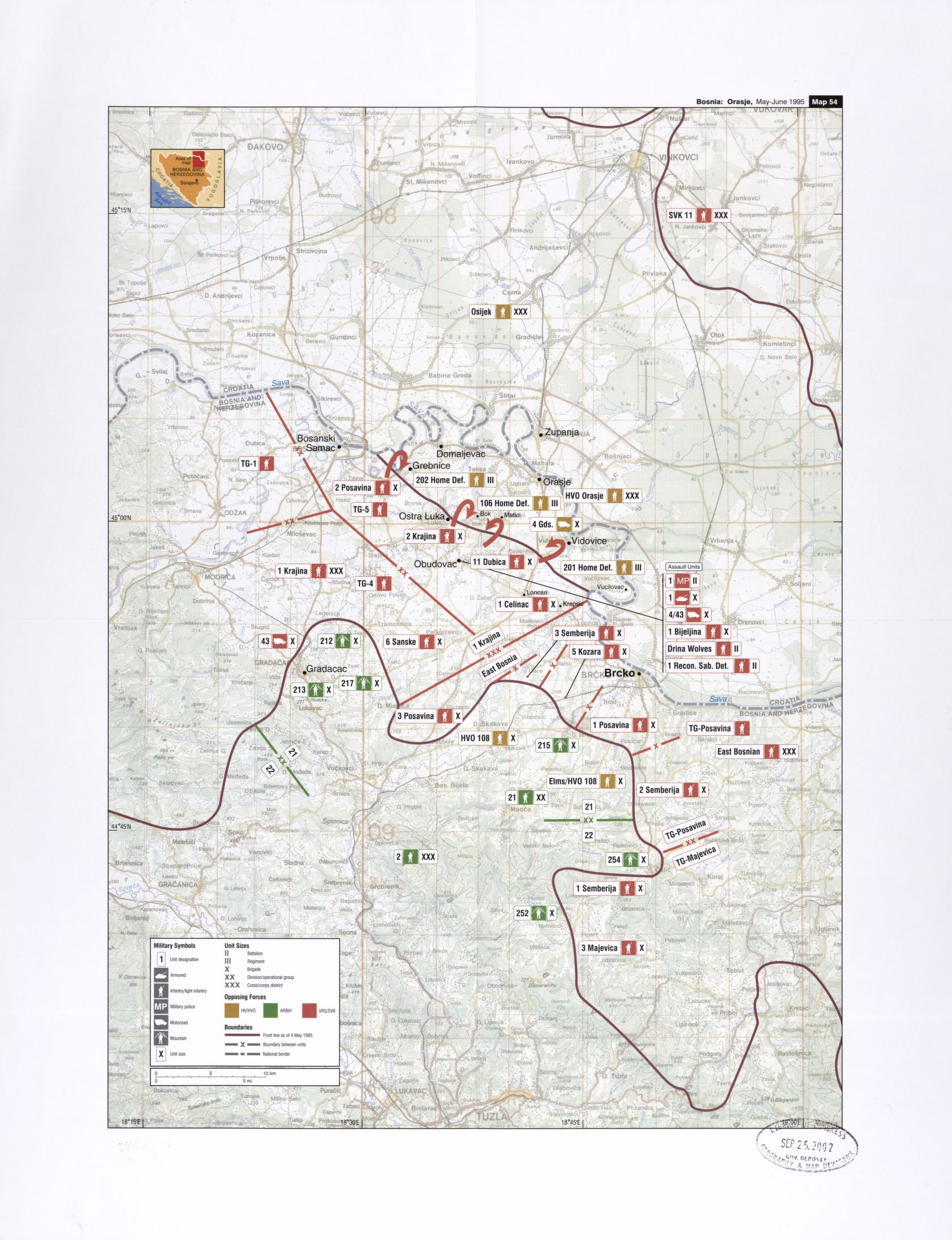
Bosnia, Orašje; May-June 1995

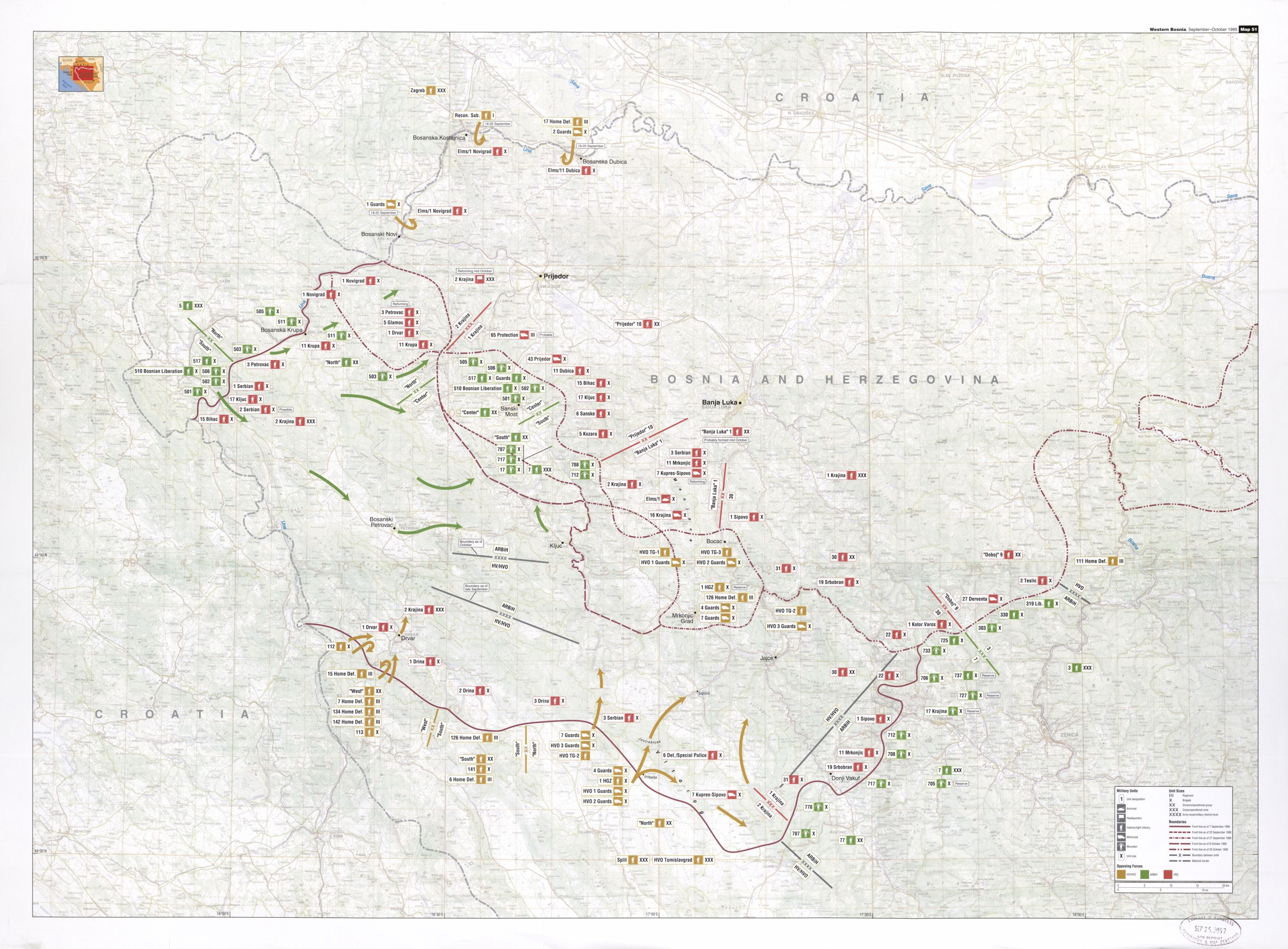
Western Bosnia; September-October 1995

== See also ==
- Army of Republika Srpska
- 1st Krajina Corps
- 2nd Krajina Brigade
- Operation Corridor 92
- Battle of Orašje
- Operation Mistral 2
- Milan Čeleketić
- Novica Simić
