= Ivan Ivanković =

Croatian musician (born 1988)

- Born: 23 September 1988 (age 38); Virovitica, Yugoslavia
- Occupations: Guitarist; singer
- Instruments: Guitar
- Years active: 2007–present

Ivan Ivanković (born 23 September 1988) is a Croatian musician who served as the guitarist of Thompson Band led by Marko Perković.

== Early life ==
Ivanković grew up in the small town of Orlovac Zdenački in Bjelovar-Bilogora County. He learned his first chords at the age of ten on a borrowed classic guitar. At the age of thirteen, Ivanković received an electric guitar as a gift and began guitar training for eight hours a day. With patience, he sat for hours with the old tape recorder and learned to play the songs by his favourite bands, including Guns 'n' Roses, Metallica, and Iron Maiden. After graduating from elementary school in Grubišno Polje, Ivanković moved to Osijek, where he began to attend an art high school.

Ivanković was a member of the rock band Nuspojava in Osijek, with which he spent most of his time and played many concerts. At the end of high school, music and guitar became his priority.

== Career ==
Ivanković started his professional music career at the age of 21, having attended open-air rock concerts throughout Croatia, Slovenia, and Bosnia and Herzegovina. In 2010, he applied for the Master 2010 guitar competition in Zagreb and won first place. Ivanković soon became a member of Thompson Band and spent most of his guitar career with Marko Perković.

From 2014 to 2017, Ivanković also published several solo projects in English. In 2018, he announced his departure from Thompson Band. In 2019, Ivanković devoted himself to his solo career, signed a contract for the publishing house Croatia Records, and introduced himself to the audience with the song "Bijeg od sjećanja". On 5 July 2025, he participated in Thompson's new album Pilgrima and was featured with him at the Zagreb Hippodrome.

== Discography ==
Title	Year	Notes	Ref.
"Srce za Ljubav"	2019	Debut single	
"Bijeg Od Sjećanja"	2019		
"U ovaj grad"	2019		
"Dani Prolaze"	2020		
"Kad Sklopim Svoje Oči"	2020		
