= Stara Gradiška =

- Municipality
- Općina Stara Gradiška; Municipality of Stara Gradiška
- Interactive map of Stara Gradiška
- Location within Croatia
- Coordinates: 45°9′N 17°15′E
- Country: Croatia
- County: Brod-Posavina County

Government
  - Mayor: Velimir Paušić (HDZ)

Area
  - Municipality: 77.3 km^{2} (29.8 sq mi)
  - Urban: 0.5 km^{2} (0.19 sq mi)

Population (2021)
  - Municipality: 911
  - Density: 11.8/km^{2} (30.5/sq mi)
  - Urban: 207
  - Urban density: 410/km^{2} (1,100/sq mi)
- Time zone: UTC+1 (CET)
  - Summer (DST): UTC+2 (CEST)
- Postal code: 35430 Okučani
- Vehicle registration: NG
- Website: staragradiska.com

Stara Gradiška (pronounced [stâːraː ɡrǎdiʃka], German: Altgradisch) is a village and a municipality in Slavonia, in the Brod-Posavina County of Croatia. It is located on the left bank of the river Sava, across from Gradiška in Bosnia and Herzegovina. The place is well known for the Stara Gradiška prison and Stara Gradiška concentration camp.

== Etymology ==
The first word in the name means Old as there's also a New Gradiška nearby, the town of Nova Gradiška.

== History ==
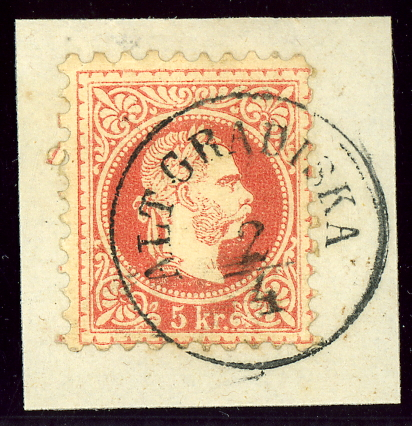
Austrian KK stamp cancelled ca 1870

The Ottoman built a fortress opposite it, which served as the Bosnia Eyalet's northern defense line. That fortress was also called Berbir or Turska Gradiška. During the Austro-Turkish War, the battle for Turska Gradiška began on 23 June 1789. After the forces of Generalfeldmarschall Ernst Gideon von Laudon captured the fortress on 9 July, Johann Thomas Trattnern made a map of it and Stara Gradiška.

Until 1918, Stara Gradiška (then Alt-Gradiska) was part of the Habsburg monarchy (Kingdom of Croatia-Slavonia after the compromise of 1867), in the Croatia-Slavonia Military Border District. The post-office was opened in 1859.

In the late 19th and early 20th century, Stara Gradiška was part of the Požega County of the Kingdom of Croatia-Slavonia.

The municipality is home to the cultural organization KUD Posavina. It celebrates the feast of St. Michael as its municipal day. Stara Gradiška is underdeveloped municipality which is statistically classified as the First Category Area of Special State Concern by the Government of Croatia.

== Demographics ==
In 2021, the municipality had 911 residents in the following 7 settlements:

- Donji Varoš, population: 206
- Gornji Varoš, population: 189
- Gređani, population: 105
- Novi Varoš, population: 113
- Pivare, population: 20
- Stara Gradiška, population: 207
- Uskoci, population: 71
Stara Gradiška: Population trends 1857–2021
v

population	2650	3280	3519	3466	3494	3814	3469	4090	3270	3449	3448	3000	2633	2531	1717	1363	911
	1857	1869	1880	1890	1900	1910	1921	1931	1948	1953	1961	1971	1981	1991	2001	2011	2021

Sources: Croatian Bureau of Statistics publications

== Politics ==
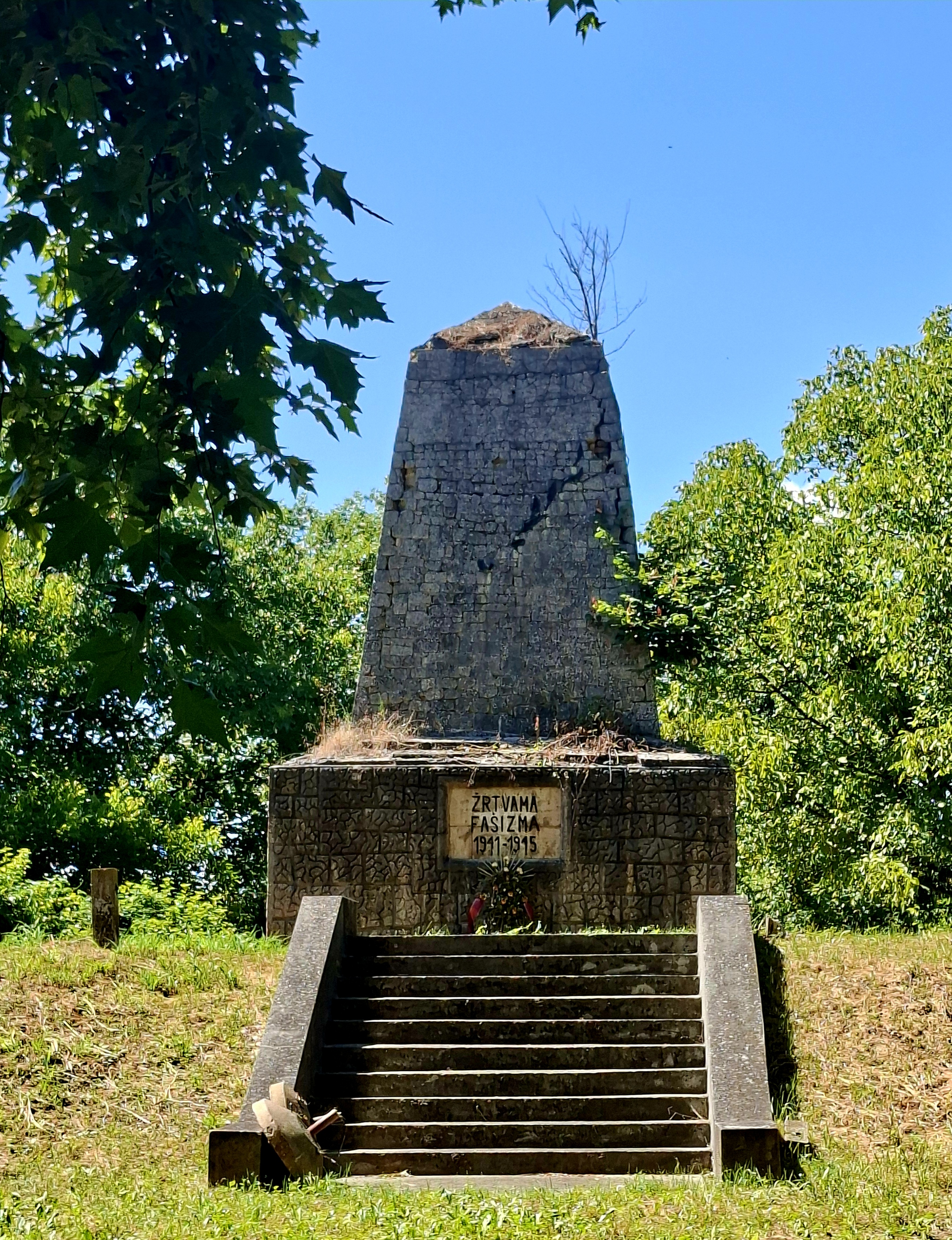
Yugoslav-era memorial to the victims of fascism in Stara Gradiška

=== Minority councils ===
Directly elected minority councils and representatives are tasked with consulting tasks for the local or regional authorities in which they are advocating for minority rights and interests, integration into public life and participation in the management of local affairs. At the 2023 Croatian national minorities councils and representatives elections Serbs of Croatia fulfilled legal requirements to elect 10 members minority councils of the Municipality of Stara Gradiška.

== Bibliography ==
- Trattnern, Johann Thomas (1789). Carte der Belagerung und Eroberung der Festung Berbir oder Türkisch Gradisca (Map). Signature HR-ZaNSK S-JZ-XVIII-147.
