= Okučani =

- Municipality
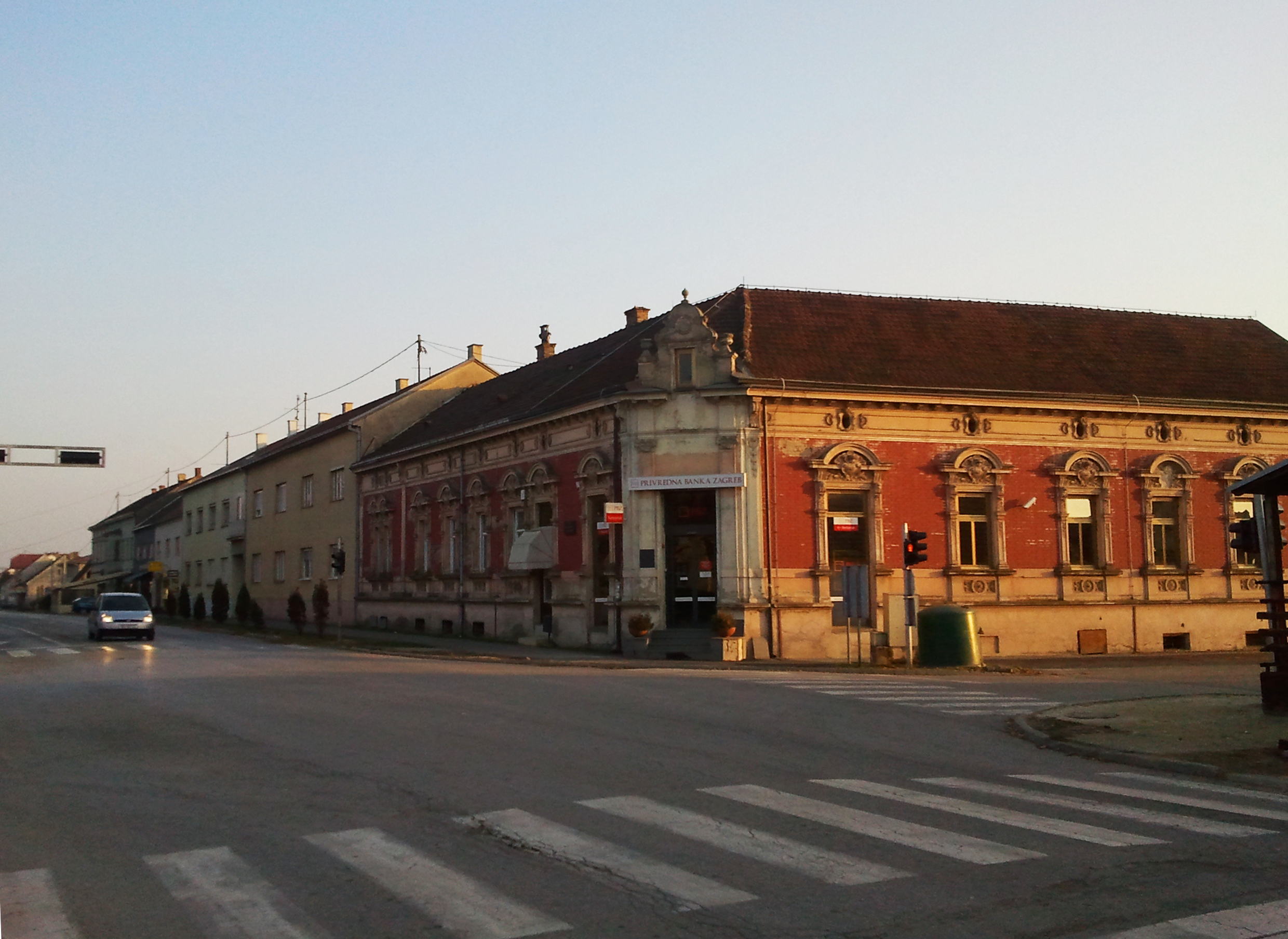
- Interactive map of Okučani
- Location of Okučani in Croatia
- Coordinates: 45°15′N 17°12′E
- Country: Croatia
- County: Brod-Posavina County

Government
  - Mayor: Aca Vidaković (HDZ)

Area
  - Municipality: 159.6 km^{2} (61.6 sq mi)
  - Urban: 5.7 km^{2} (2.2 sq mi)

Population (2021)
  - Municipality: 2,323
  - Density: 14.56/km^{2} (37.70/sq mi)
  - Urban: 1,143
  - Urban density: 200/km^{2} (520/sq mi)
- Postal code: 35430 Okučani
- Website: okucani.hr

Okučani is a village and municipal centre in Brod-Posavina, western Slavonia, Croatia. It is located 19 km southeast of Novska and 17 km west of Nova Gradiška.

== Demographics ==
In 2021, the municipality had 2,323 residents in the following 17 settlements:

- Benkovac, population 78
- Bijela Stijena, population 7
- Bobare, population 8
- Bodegraj, population 262
- Cage, population 290
- Čaprginci, population 2
- Čovac, population 74
- Donji Rogolji, population 24
- Gornji Rogolji, population 15
- Lađevac, population 185
- Lještani, population 10
- Okučani, population 1,143
- Šagovina Mašićka, population 5
- Širinci, population 0
- Trnakovac, population 84
- Vrbovljani, population 135
- Žuberkovac, population 1
Okučani: Population trends 1857–2021
v

population	3962	4228	4273	5218	5600	6424	6279	6835	5470	5615	5810	6203	5851	5712	4224	3447	2323
	1857	1869	1880	1890	1900	1910	1921	1931	1948	1953	1961	1971	1981	1991	2001	2011	2021

Sources: Croatian Bureau of Statistics publications

== History ==
Before 18th century, village was known by the name of Dijanovci, when it was renamed in Okučani, by the meander ("okuka") of the Sloboština river.

Okučani was captured and incorporated into the Serbian Autonomous Oblast of Western Slavonia early in the Croatian War for Independence. After being annexed by the unrecognized Republic of Serbian Krajina, Okučani and the rest of the pocket were liberated by Croatian Forces after Operation Flash on May 1, 1995.

== Politics ==
=== Minority councils ===
Directly elected minority councils and representatives are tasked with consulting tasks for the local or regional authorities in which they are advocating for minority rights and interests, integration into public life and participation in the management of local affairs. At the 2023 Croatian national minorities councils and representatives elections Serbs of Croatia fulfilled legal requirements to elect 10 members minority councils of the Municipality of Okučani.

== See also ==
- Okučani railway station
