= Mali Zdenci =

Mali Zdenci Zdenci
- Village
- Location within Croatia
- Country: Croatia
- County: Bjelovar-Bilogora County
- Municipality: Grubišno Polje

Area
  - Total: 3.0 sq mi (7.7 km^{2})
- Elevation: 469 ft (143 m)

Population (2021)
  - Total: 352
  - Density: 120/sq mi (46/km^{2})
- Time zone: UTC+1 (CET)
  - Summer (DST): UTC+2 (CEST)
- Postal code: 43293

Mali Zdenci is a village in Croatia. It is connected by the D5 highway. It is located in the Bjelovar-Bilogora County. The village's sister village is Veliki Zdenci. It is a part of Grubišno Polje municipality.

== Religion ==
Serbian Orthodox church of the Nativity of the Virgin Mary built in 1761 is protected cultural heritage of the Republic of Croatia. Serb Orthodox minority community settled in the village during the Ottoman Empire rule of the area, but its numbers significantly decreased during the period of Independent State of Croatia as well as during the Croatian War of Independence. In 1991 the church was completely destroyed. Its reconstruction was financed by the Ministry of Culture of the Republic of Croatia. The church's reopening in 2009 was attended by the Jovan Pavlović.

== Demographics ==
According to the 2021 census, its population was 352.
