= Romeo Van Dessel =

Belgian footballer

Personal information
- Date of birth: 9 April 1989 (age 37)
- Place of birth: Reet, Belgium
- Height: 1.91 m (6 ft 3 in)
- Position: Midfielder

Youth career
- Reet S.K.
- FC Duffel
- Mechelen

Senior career*
Years	Team	Apps	(Gls)
2008–2012	Mechelen	23	(3)
2011–2012	→ Royal Antwerp (loan)	26	(0)
2012–2013	Dender EH	34	(6)
2013–2017	Berchem Sport		
- * Club domestic league appearances and goals

Romeo Van Dessel (born 9 April 1989) is a Belgian retired football (soccer) midfielder. He started his career at Mechelen in 2008, before completing a loan move to Antwerp in 2011. In 2012, he moved to Dender EH.
