= Uskoci (disambiguation) =

Uskoci may refer to:

- Uskoks (Uskoci)
- Uskoci (tribe), tribe of Montenegro in Old Herzegovina
- Uskoci, Croatia, a village in the municipality of Stara Gradiška
