= Grigor Vitez =

Yugoslav writer and translator

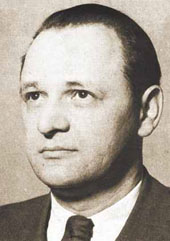
- Portrait of Vitez
- Born: Grigor Vitez; 15 February 1911; Kosovac near Gornji Bogićevci, Kingdom of Croatia-Slavonia, Austro-Hungary
- Died: 23 November 1966 (aged 55); Zagreb, SR Croatia, SFR Yugoslavia
- Resting place: Kosovac
- Citizenship: Yugoslav
- Occupation: Writer
- Writing career
- Language: Serbo-Croatian
- Notable awards: Order of Labour; Order of the Republic

Grigor Vitez (Serbo-Croatian Cyrillic: Григор Витез; 15 February 1911 – 23 November 1966) was a Yugoslav writer and translator. He is best remembered as the author of children's poetry and other forms of literature for children and youth.

== Biography ==
Grigor Vitez was born to a Serb family in the village of Kosovac near Okučani. In a 1969 book on children's writers, Vitez published how his father's family were named Alavanja and had come to Okučani from north Dalmatia. One of his ancestors held the honorary title of knight (Serbo-Croatian: vitez), which turned into the family surname. His mother's family was named Milosavljević and they are believed to have come to Slavonia from Bosnia or in the 17th-century great migration.

He went to elementary school in Okučani and to a gymnasium in Nova Gradiška. As a high school student he started collecting folk poetry of the area. Vitez went on to finish the state school for teachers.

In 1933, he joined the Communists and fought in the World War II as a member of the Yugoslav Partisans. After the World War II, he worked in the Ministry of Education and as editor for Mladost publishing house, in charge for children's and youth edition. Vitez was also working for the Novo pokoljenje publishing company. He edited thirteen publishing series for children and youth.

In 1956, when the publishing house Svjetlost from Sarajevo had him review a Borislav Pavić anthology of children's poetry they intended to publish, Vitez criticised him because, even though Serbian literature for children was de facto richer than Croatian, he should have included more poets from Croatia.

Vitez was a prolific translator, mostly from Russian. He translated poems by Alexander Pushkin, Mikhail Lermontov, Boris Pasternak, Sergei Yesenin, Vladimir Mayakovsky, Eduard Bagritsky, Vera Inber, Alexey Surkov, Mikhail Golodny, Stepan Shchipachev, Aleksandr Tvardovsky etc., and prose from the works of Leo Tolstoy, Anton Chekhov, Maxim Gorky and Aleksey Nikolayevich Tolstoy. He also translated Pavel Golia, Fran Levstik, Srečko Kosovel, Matjaž Klopčič, Alojz Gradnik, Cene Vipotnik, Tone Pavček, Janez Menart and other Slovenian poets. Alongside Russian and Slovenian he translated works from French language.

He held a correspondence with Nobel Prize winning writer Boris Pasternak. Vitez died at the age of 55 and was buried in his hometown.

== Legacy ==
He was awarded the Yugoslav Order of Labour, Order of the Republic and Award of the City of Zagreb.

Grigor Vitez Award for literature written for children was established in 1967. It is the oldest awards of its kind in modern-day Croatia.

Most of the works by Serbian writers was removed from the textbooks and schools from Croatia during and after the Croatian War of Independence, but Vitez's works was continuously part of the school curriculum in Croatia.

Prosvjeta published his selected works in 2011, marking 100 years of his birth.

Schools in Osijek, Sveti Ivan Žabno, Poljana and Zagreb are named after him, as well as the local library in Gornji Bogićevci.

== Works ==
- San boraca u zoru, Nakladni zavod Hrvatske, Zagreb, 1948
- Pjesme, Zora Državno izdavačko poduzeće Hrvatske, Zagreb, 1950
- Naoružane ruže, Kultura, Zagreb, 1955
- Vesele zamke, Mladost, Zagreb, 1955
- Prepelica, Prosvjeta, Zagreb, 1956
- Lirika o Slavoniji, urednik, Slavonija danas, Osijek, 1956
- Povjerenje životu, Narodna prosvjeta, Sarajevo, 1957
- Sto vukova, i druge pjesme za djecu, "Svjetlost", Sarajevo, 1957
- Perzijske bajke, Mladost, Zagreb, 1958.
- Kad bi drveće hodalo, Mladost, Zagreb, 1959
- Kao lišće i trava: pjesme, Matica hrvatska, Zagreb, 1960
- Maksimir, Mladost, Zagreb, 1960
- Iza brda plava: izbor pjesama za djecu, Matica hrvatska, Zagreb, 1961
- Jednog jutra u gaju, editor, 1961
- Hvatajte lopova, "Svjetlost", Sarajevo, 1964
- Gdje priče rastu, Mladost, Zagreb, 1965.
- Zekina kuća, Mladost, Zagreb, 1965
- Igra se nastavlja, posthumous, 1967
- Pjesme četiri vjetra, editor, 1968
- Nevidljive ptice, Mozaik knjiga, 2002

== Sources ==
- Kukić Rukavina, Ivana (2015). Nakladnički nizovi Grigora Viteza za djecu i mladež (PDF) (Thesis) (in Croatian). Zagreb: Faculty of Philosophy, University of Zagreb. p. 338.
