= Rastovac =

Rastovac may refer to:

- Rastovac, Kalinovik, a village near Kalinovik, Bosnia and Herzegovina
- Rastovac, Grubišno Polje, a village near Grubišno Polje, Bjelovar-Bilogora County, Croatia
- Rastovac, Ivanska, a village near Ivanska, Bjelovar-Bilogora County, Croatia
- Rastovac, Zagvozd, a village near Zagvozd, Split-Dalmatia County, Croatia
- Rastovac, Marina, a village near Marina, Split-Dalmatia County, Croatia
- Rastovac Budački, a village near Krnjak, Karlovac County, Croatia
- Rastovac (Nikšić), a small town in Nikšić Municipality, Montenegro
