= Reet =

Reet may refer to:

- Reet, Belgium, a town near Rumst
- Reet S.K., a football club from Reet, Belgium
- Reet (given name), Estonian feminine name
- Danny Reet, English footballer
- Mary Reet, one of the witnessess against serial killer Beverley Allitt
- Real estate investment trust (REIT, pronounced "reet"), a type of company that owns, and in most cases operates, income-producing real estate
