= Terezino Polje =

Coordinates: 45°56′N 17°28′E

- Village
- Interactive map of Terezino Polje
- Country: Croatia
- County: Virovitica-Podravina County
- Municipality: Lukač

Area
  - Total: 3.3 km^{2} (1.3 sq mi)

Population (2021)
  - Total: 196
  - Density: 59/km^{2} (150/sq mi)
- Time zone: UTC+1 (CET)
  - Summer (DST): UTC+2 (CEST)

Terezino Polje is a village in Croatia, on the border with Hungary. It is connected by the D5 highway to Virovitica in the south and the eponymous border crossing over the Drava to Barcs, Hungary in the north.
