= Donja Rašenica =

- Village
- Location within Croatia
- Coordinates: 45.6747741°N 17.1848451°E
- Country: Croatia
- County: Bjelovar-Bilogora County
- Municipality: Grubišno Polje

Area
  - Total: 2.6 sq mi (6.7 km^{2})

Population (2021)
  - Total: 129
  - Density: 50/sq mi (19/km^{2})
- Time zone: UTC+1 (CET)
  - Summer (DST): UTC+2 (CEST)

Donja Rašenica is a village in Croatia.

== Demographics ==
According to the 2021 census, its population was 129.
