= Munije =

- Village
- Location within Croatia
- Coordinates: 45.6785896°N 17.2786132°E
- Country: Croatia
- County: Bjelovar-Bilogora County
- Municipality: Grubišno Polje

Area
  - Total: 2.1 sq mi (5.4 km^{2})

Population (2021)
  - Total: 26
  - Density: 12/sq mi (4.8/km^{2})
- Time zone: UTC+1 (CET)
  - Summer (DST): UTC+2 (CEST)

Munije is a village in Croatia.

== Demographics ==
According to the 2021 census, its population was 26.
