= Bjelanovac =

Coordinates: 45°22′N 17°11′E

- Village
- Interactive map of Bjelanovac
- Country: Croatia
- County: Požega-Slavonia
- Municipality: Lipik

Area
  - Total: 1.8 sq mi (4.7 km^{2})

Population (2021)
  - Total: 4
  - Density: 2.2/sq mi (0.85/km^{2})
- Time zone: UTC+1 (CET)
  - Summer (DST): UTC+2 (CEST)

Bjelanovac is a village in Croatia. It is connected by the D5 highway.
