= First Military Region (Yugoslavia) =

The First Military Region of the Yugoslav Ground Forces was a military district active in various forms from the 1960s to the 1990s. It was headquartered in Belgrade-Topčider, and responsible for coordinating the defence of central and north-eastern Yugoslavia. It was initially the First Military Area/District or Prva vojna oblast, later Prva armijska oblast, and finally reformed back to 1. vojna oblast under the 1988 Jedinstvo ("Unity") plan.

In the 1980s its region covered the 4th Motorised Division at Sarajevo; the 5th Infantry Division at Banja Luka; and the 12th Motorised Division at Osijek.

Under the 1988 Jedinstvo plan it had an estimated strength was 40,000 troops organized into six corps formations, plus units directly subordinate to the MD.

In 1988 the Yugoslav Army had placed the Bosnian provincial Territorial Defence Force under the First Military Region, and reduced its strength two-thirds to 86,362 in December 1991.

Military district units subordinate to the 1st MD included:

- 389 Missile Artillery Brigade, Banja Luka (9K52 Luna-M (NATO "Frog-7") rockets)
- 1 Mixed Anti-Tank Brigade, Belgrade
- 152 Mixed Artillery Brigade, Cuprija
- 240 Self-propelled Medium Air Defence Missile Regiment, Sarajevo-Lukavica (Kub-M, NATO-Code SA-6 Gainful)
- 310th Self-propelled Medium Air Defence Missile Regiment, Kragujevac-Sumarice (Kub-M)
- 46th Protection Regiment, Beograd-Topcider (security unit for district headquarters)
- 12th Sabotage and Reconnaissance Battalion, Vrdnik
- 1st Guards Proletarian Mechanized Division (HQ in Belgrade-Banjica)
  - 1st Guards Mechanised Brigade (Belgrade)
  - 2nd Guards Mechanised Brigade (Valjevo)
  - 3rd Guards Mechanised Brigade (Pozarevac)
- Belgrade City Defence Command
  - 505th Motorised Brigade

Corps headquarters subordinate to the 1st MD included:

- 4th Corps, headquartered at Sarajevo;
  - Two motorised brigades, one light infantry brigade, one mountain brigade
- 5th Corps, headquartered at Banja Luka;
  - 329th Armored Brigade, Banja Luka - B (upgraded to A in 1990)
  - 16th Proletarian Motorized Brigade, Banja Luka
  - 343rd Motorized Brigade, Prijedor
  - 10th, 13th, and 40th Partisan Divisions
- 12th Corps, headquartered at Novi Sad. Upgraded from 12th Motorised Division. Major General Mladen Bratić, commander of the corps, was killed during the Battle of Vukovar in 1991;
- 17th Corps, headquartered at Tuzla. This corps later became the East Bosnia Corps of the Army of Republika Srpska;
  - 12th Proletarian Mechanised Brigade, Osijek
- 24th Corps, headquartered at Kragujevac; and
- 37th Corps, headquartered at Titovo Uzice.

In addition to these forces, the 1st MD had a rocket artillery brigade directly subordinate to the MD headquarters. The district was thought to have 968 tanks, 633 armoured fighting vehicles and 1,392 artillery pieces, including 92 multiple rocket launchers.

The Yugoslav Air Force helicopter squadron supporting the district was the 896 Reconnaissance & Liaison Squadron at Sarajevo-Rajlovac with a detachment stationed at Batajnica Air Base in Belgrade.

After the commitment of the 1st Guards Proletarian Mechanized Division to the Battle of Vukovar in 1991, much of the 5th Corps in Banja Luka changed allegiance to become the 1st Krajina Corps of the Army of Republika Srpska. The remnants of the First Military District/Region in Serbia proper became the basis of the new FRY Ground Forces First Army.

The new First Army comprised the Mechanized Corps (the 1st Guards Proletarian Mechanized Division, having lost its "Proletarian" title); the Novi Sad Corps; the Belgrade City Command; the Kragujevac Corps; the Special Corps; two smaller divisions; three anti-aircraft rocket regiments; and smaller units. The new Mechanized Corps comprised the three previous divisional mechanized brigades plus the 252nd Armored Brigade from Kraljevo. The Corps did not exist for long; the 1st Mechanized Brigade was transformed into the 1st Armored Brigade, while the 2nd Mechanized Brigade became the 20th Motorized Brigade. The brigades' locations remained unchanged—they stayed in Belgrade and Valjevo.

== Commanders ==
1st Army Era (1964–1988)

- Colonel General Miloje Milojević (Commanded from 1959 to 1964).
- Colonel General Mirko Jovanović (1969-75)
- Colonel General Petar Gračanin (Commanded from May 1982 to September 1985)

1st Military District Era (1988–1991)

- General sr:Anton Lukežić
- Colonel General sr:Aleksandar Spirkovski (Commanded from 1989 to September 1991)
- Colonel General Života Panić or Zivota Avramovic (Commanded from July 1991 to January 1992)
