= Barica =

- Village
- Location within Croatia
- Coordinates: 45.5162134°N 17.2668076°E
- Country: Croatia
- County: Bjelovar-Bilogora County
- Municipality: Sirač

Area
  - Total: 0.66 sq mi (1.7 km^{2})

Population (2021)
  - Total: 43
  - Density: 66/sq mi (25/km^{2})
- Time zone: UTC+1 (CET)
  - Summer (DST): UTC+2 (CEST)

Barica is a village in Bjelovar-Bilogora County, Croatia. The village is part of the municipality of Sirač.

== Demographics ==
According to the 2021 census, its population was 43.
