= Miljanovac =

Milijanovac
- Village
- Location within Croatia
- Country: Croatia
- County: Bjelovar-Bilogora County
- Municipality: Sirač

Area
  - Total: 2.2 sq mi (5.7 km^{2})

Population (2021)
  - Total: 103
  - Density: 47/sq mi (18/km^{2})
- Time zone: UTC+1 (CET)
  - Summer (DST): UTC+2 (CEST)

Miljanovac is a village in Croatia. It is part of the municipality of Sirač.

== Demographics ==
The population, which was 160 in 2011, had declined to 103 by the 2021 census.
