= Ritt =

Given name

Ritt is a given name and a surname. Notable people with the name include:

- Eugène Ritt (1817–1898), French theatermaker
- Joseph Ritt (1893–1951), American mathematician at Columbia University
- Martin Ritt (1914–1990), American director, actor, and playwright in both film and theater
- Stefan Ritt (born 1964), German physicist
- Ritt Bjerregaard (1941–2023), Danish politician
- Ritt Momney (born 1999), American singer

== See also ==
- Der letzte Ritt nach Santa Cruz, (The Last Ride to Santa Cruz), 1964 German Western film
- Der Ritt auf dem Schmetterling, controversial song by German punk band Die Ärzte
- Rit (disambiguation)
- Writ
