= Šagovina Mašićka =

- Coordinates: 45.307°N 17.283°E

Šagovina Mašićka, also referred to as Mašićka Šagovina, is a village near Okučani, Croatia.

== Population ==
Šagovina Mašićka: Population trends 1857–2021
v

population	175	169	128	164	195	236	239	267	224	209	231	228	239	209	18	7	5
	1857	1869	1880	1890	1900	1910	1921	1931	1948	1953	1961	1971	1981	1991	2001	2011	2021

Note:Named Šagovina until the census of 1900. Sources:Croatian Bureau of Statistics publications
