= Velika Jasenovača =

- Village
- Location within Croatia
- Coordinates: 45.7245288°N 17.0622016°E
- Country: Croatia
- County: Bjelovar-Bilogora County
- Municipality: Grubišno Polje

Area
  - Total: 2.3 sq mi (6.0 km^{2})

Population (2021)
  - Total: 35
  - Density: 15/sq mi (5.8/km^{2})
- Time zone: UTC+1 (CET)
  - Summer (DST): UTC+2 (CEST)

Velika Jasenovača is a village in Croatia.

== Demographics ==
According to the 2021 census, its population was 35.
