= Benkovac, Brod-Posavina County =

Coordinates: 45°18′22″N 17°12′07″E

Benkovac
- Village
- Interactive map of Benkovac
- Country: Croatia
- County: Brod-Posavina County
- Municipality: Okučani

Area
  - Total: 10.7 km^{2} (4.1 sq mi)

Population (2021)
  - Total: 78
  - Density: 7.3/km^{2} (19/sq mi)
- Time zone: UTC+1 (CET)
  - Summer (DST): UTC+2 (CEST)

Benkovac is a village in Croatia. It is connected by the D5 highway.

== Notable individuals ==
- Miloš N. Đurić
