= Bijela, Croatia =

Bijela
- Village
- Location within Croatia
- Coordinates: 45.5628515°N 17.2718298°E
- Country: Croatia
- County: Bjelovar-Bilogora County
- Municipality: Sirač

Area
  - Total: 1.6 sq mi (4.2 km^{2})

Population (2021)
  - Total: 27
  - Density: 17/sq mi (6.4/km^{2})
- Time zone: UTC+1 (CET)
  - Summer (DST): UTC+2 (CEST)

Bijela is a village in Croatia.

== Demographics ==
According to the 2021 census, its population was 27.
