= Kip, Croatia =

Kip
- Village
- Location within Croatia
- Coordinates: 45°33′N 17°12′E
- Country: Croatia
- County: Bjelovar-Bilogora County
- Municipality: Sirač

Area
  - Total: 2.0 sq mi (5.1 km^{2})

Population (2021)
  - Total: 146
  - Density: 74/sq mi (29/km^{2})
- Time zone: UTC+1 (CET)
  - Summer (DST): UTC+2 (CEST)

Kip is a village in Bjelovar-Bilogora County, Croatia. Part of the municipality of Sirač, the village is connected by the D5 highway.

== Demographics ==
Its population of 148 in 2011 was largely unchanged a decade later at 146, according to the 2021 census.
