= Gornje Bazje =

Bazje
- Village
- Location within Croatia
- Coordinates: 45.909246°N 17.441091°E
- Country: Croatia
- County: Virovitica-Podravina County
- Municipality: Lukač

Area
  - Total: 11.6 km^{2} (4.5 sq mi)

Population (2021)
  - Total: 397
  - Density: 34.2/km^{2} (88.6/sq mi)
- Time zone: UTC+1 (CET)
  - Summer (DST): UTC+2 (CEST)

Bazje is a village in Croatia. It is connected by the D5 highway.
