= Gređani, Brod-Posavina County =

Gređani
- Village
- Location within Croatia
- Country: Croatia
- County: Brod-Posavina County
- Municipality: Stara Gradiška

Area
  - Total: 25.4 km^{2} (9.8 sq mi)

Population (2021)
  - Total: 105
  - Density: 4.13/km^{2} (10.7/sq mi)
- Time zone: UTC+1 (CET)
  - Summer (DST): UTC+2 (CEST)

Gređani is a village in Croatia.
