= Dugo Selo Lukačko =

- Interactive map of Dugo Selo Lukačko
- Coordinates: 45°52′33″N 17°27′01″E

Dugo Selo Lukačko is a village near Lukač, Croatia. In the 2011 census, it had 570 inhabitants.
