= 2nd Krajina Brigade =

2nd Krajina Brigade Друга крајишка бригада Druga krajiška brigada
- Brigade patch
- Active: 18 September 1991—1996
- Country: Republika Srpska
- Branch: Yugoslav Ground Forces (Yugoslav People's Army); Army of Republika Srpska
- Type: Infantry
- Size: 23.000
- Part of: 1st Krajina Corps
- Engagements: Croatian War: Operation Swath-10; Operation Hurricane-91; Bosnian War: Operation Corridor 92; Operation Flame 95; Operation Vaganj 95

Commanders
- Former commander: colonel Jovo Vukobrad

2nd Krajina Brigade (full name in Serbian: 2. крајишка бригада 1. крајишког корпуса Војске Републике Српске, 2. krajiška brigada 1. krajiškog korpusa Vojske Republike Srpske; translation: 2nd Krajina Brigade of 1st Krajina Corps of the Army of Republika Srpska) was infantry brigade of the Army of Republika Srpska and Yugoslav People's Army founded on 1991 in Rakovačke bare settlement, Banja Luka.

== History ==
The brigade was founded as part of the Yugoslav People's Army in the 5th Banja Luka Corps. It was sent to Western Slavonia in present-day Croatia where it remained active until 1992. After engagement in Croatia the brigade moved to Serbian corridor where it was part of the security forces during Operation Corridor with force of around 3000 fighters. Together with an armoured battalion of the 1st Armoured Brigade, the 2nd Krajina Brigade was part of security forces for side parts of the front, helping the 2nd Posavina Brigade from direction of Orašje and protection of the road Brčko-Lončari-Modriča.

After success in the corridor, the 2nd Brigade stayed in Posavina. Its last activities in that northeastern part of Republika Srpska were during Battle of Orašje in 1995 when it had operations in Obudovac, Šamac as part of Tactical Group 5. Their task was to use artillery and penetrate behind defence lines of Croatian Defence Council making moves toward the Sava river in the direction of Obudovac-Bok-Tolisa. Later the brigade was moved to Manjača mountain. The mission of the 2nd Krajina Infantry Brigade lasted 1700 days. 226 fighters fell in battle, 1750 were wounded and 8 fighters are still missing.

== Memorial Center ==
In 2001 a memorial center to the 2nd Krajina Brigade and a monument to the fallen fighters was raised in Rakovačke Bare, Drakulić, Banja Luka where are 234 marble posts with names of fallen soldiers.

== Gallery ==
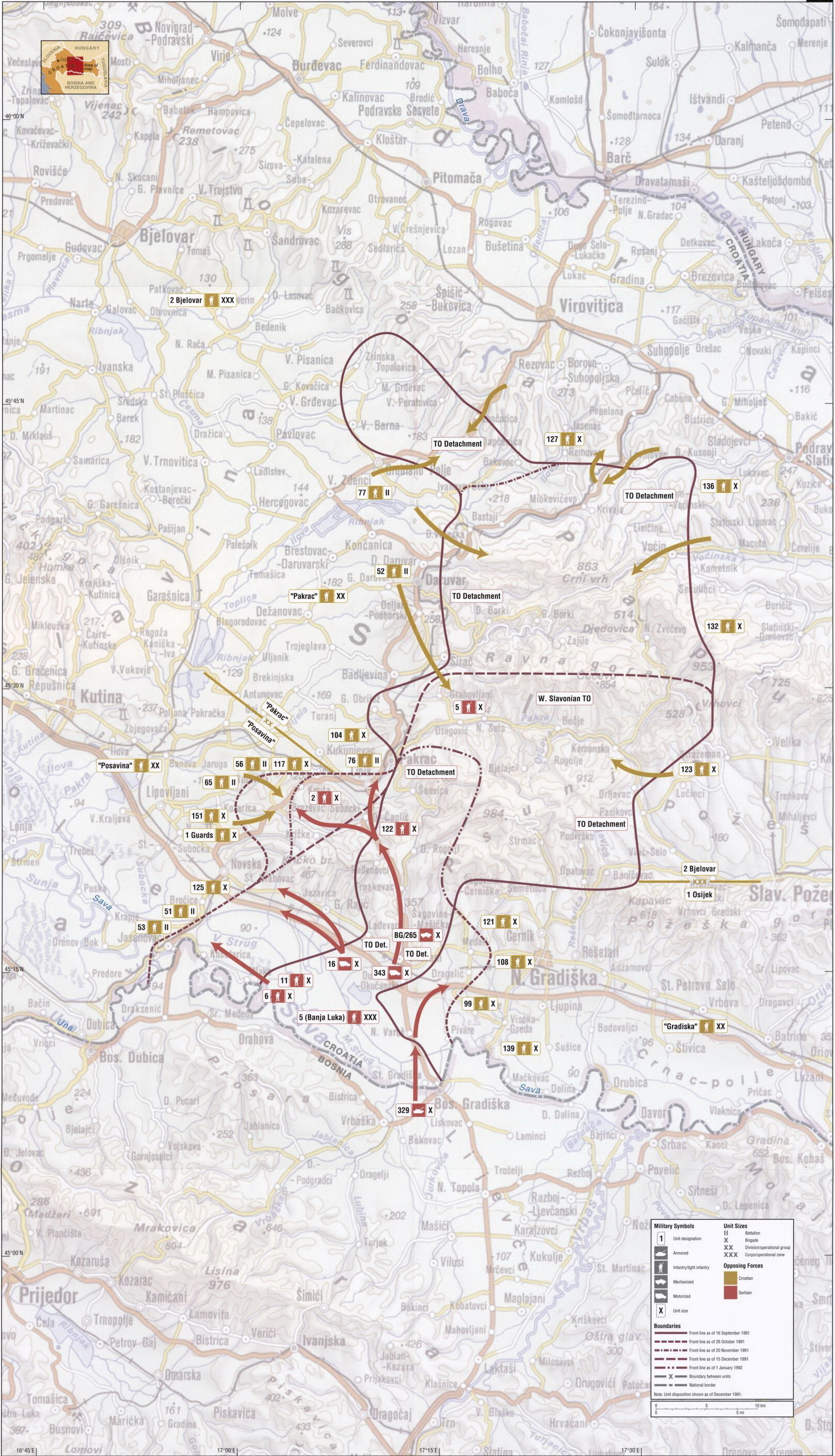
Map of situation of fights in Western Slavonia between September 1991 and January 1992 where is seeable 2nd Krajina Brigade under command of 5th Banja Luka Corps of YPA

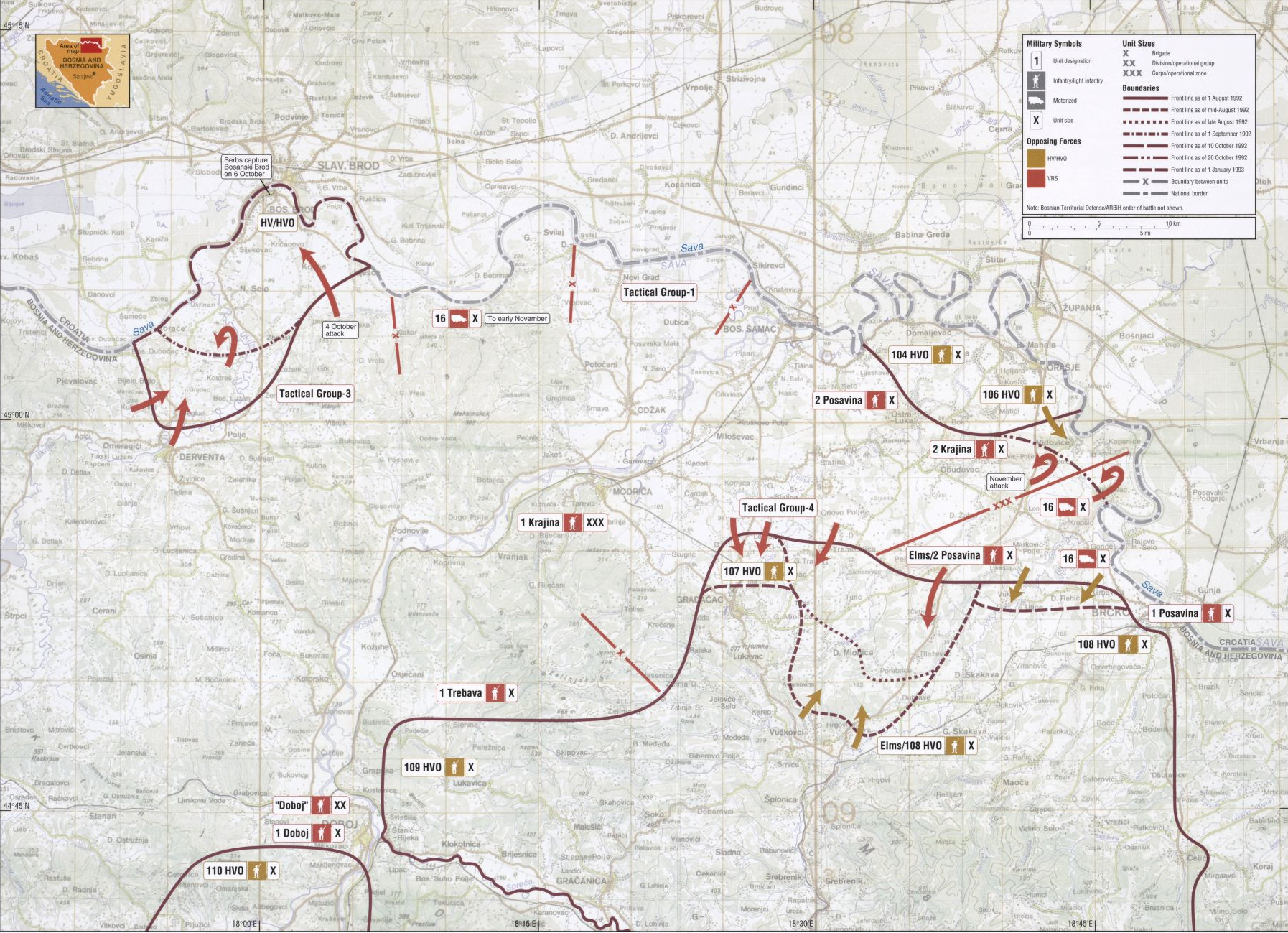
Map where is depicted fight in Posavina and 2nd Krajina Brigade is seeable around Obudovac village

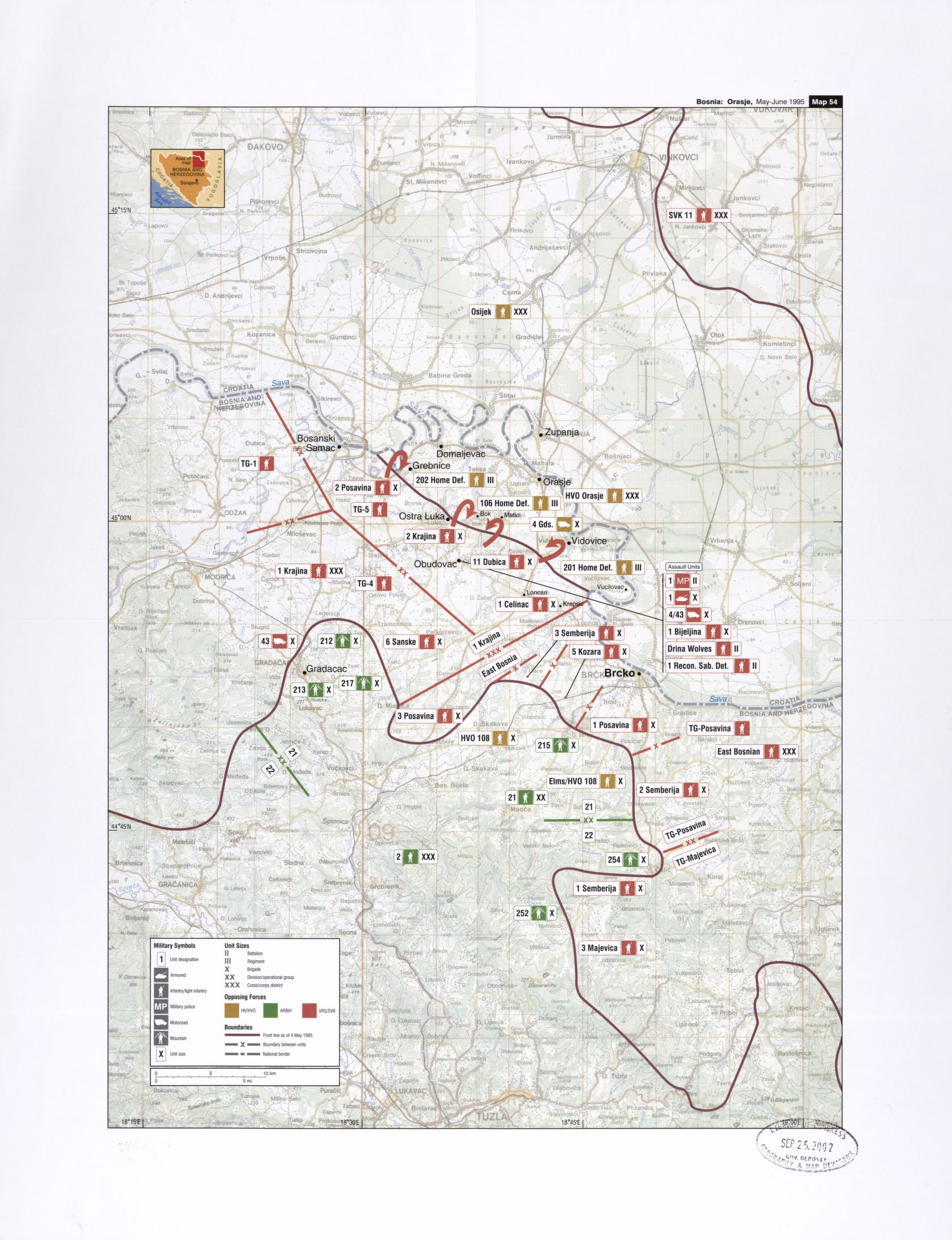
Battle of Orašje map

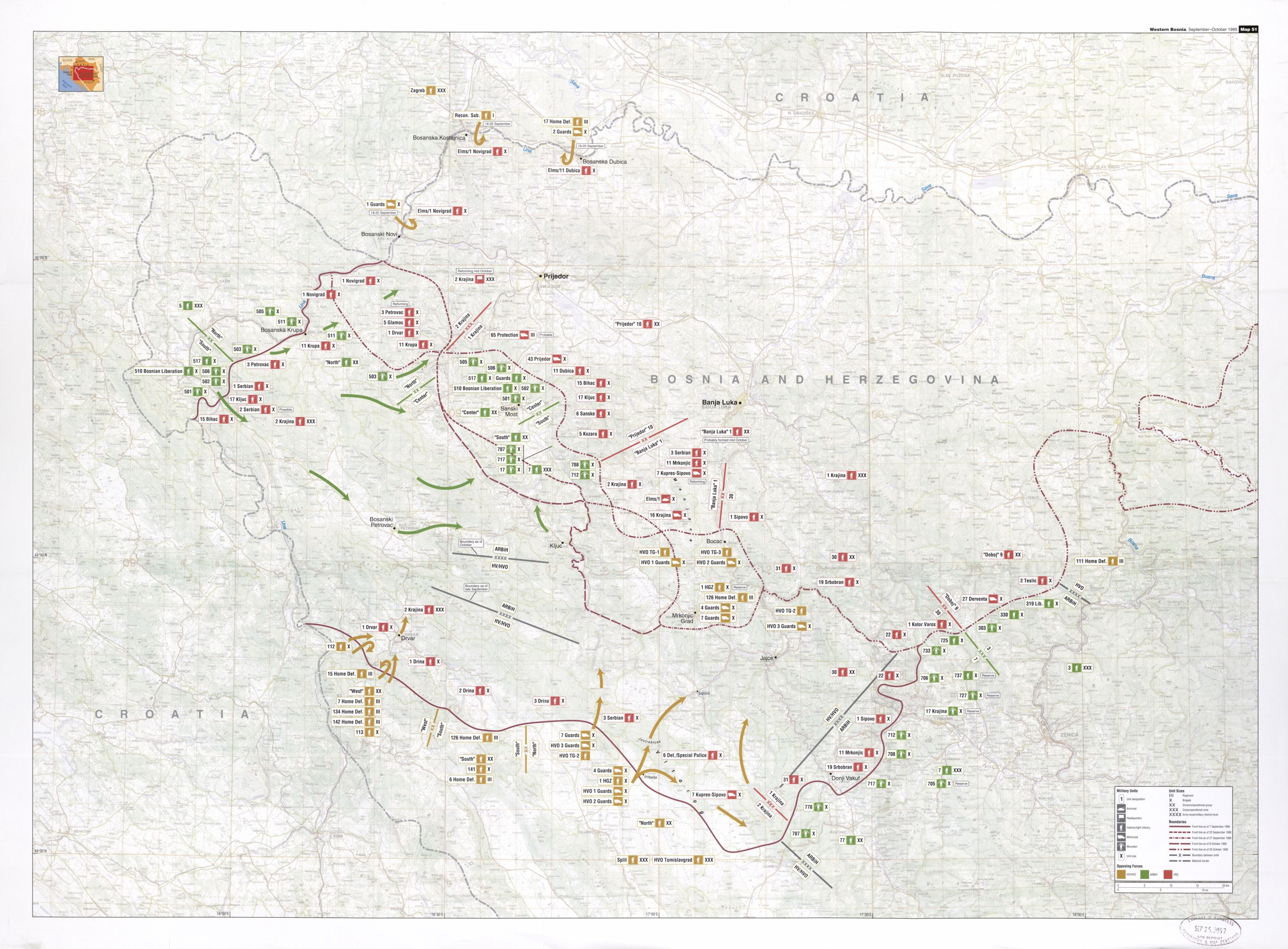
Battles in western Bosnia and Herzegovina in Autumn 1995 (2nd Krajina Brigade seeable on map south-western from Banja Luka around Gornje Ratkovo village

=== Memorial Center in Rakovačke Bare ===
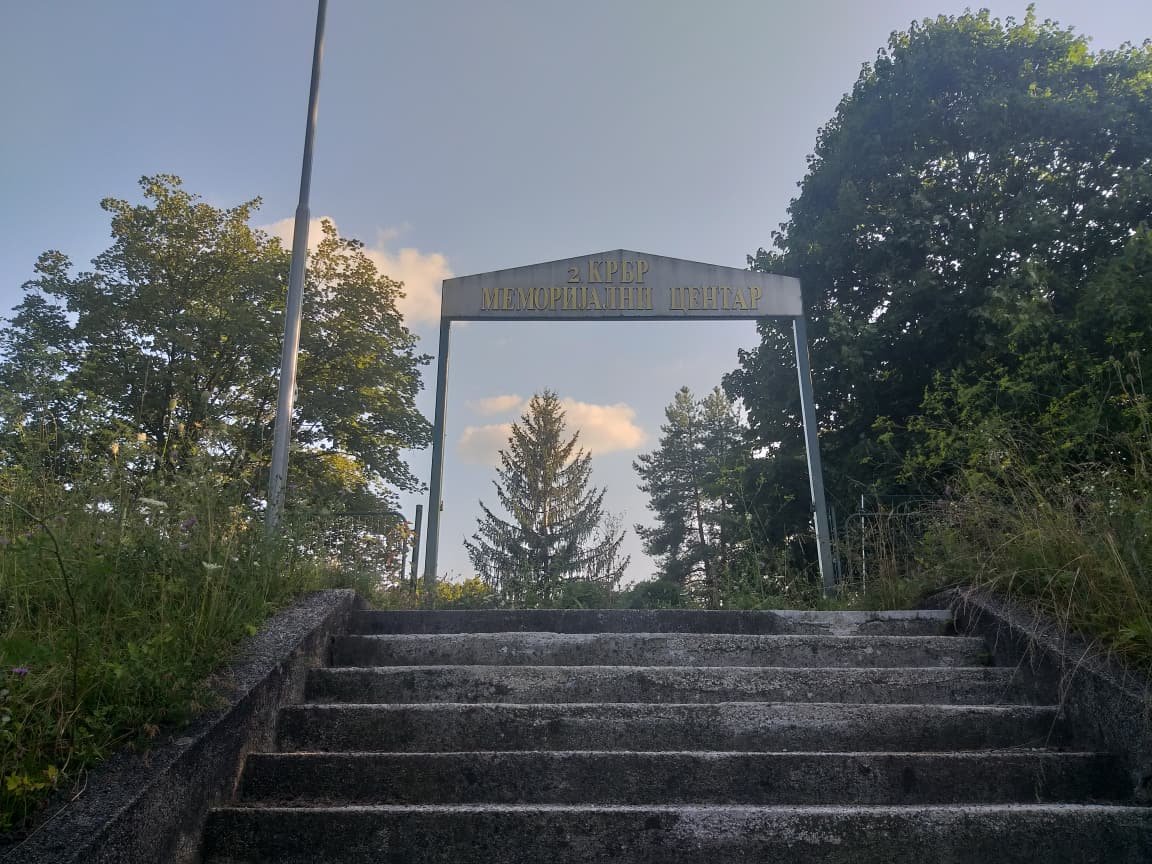
Entrance to the Memorial Center

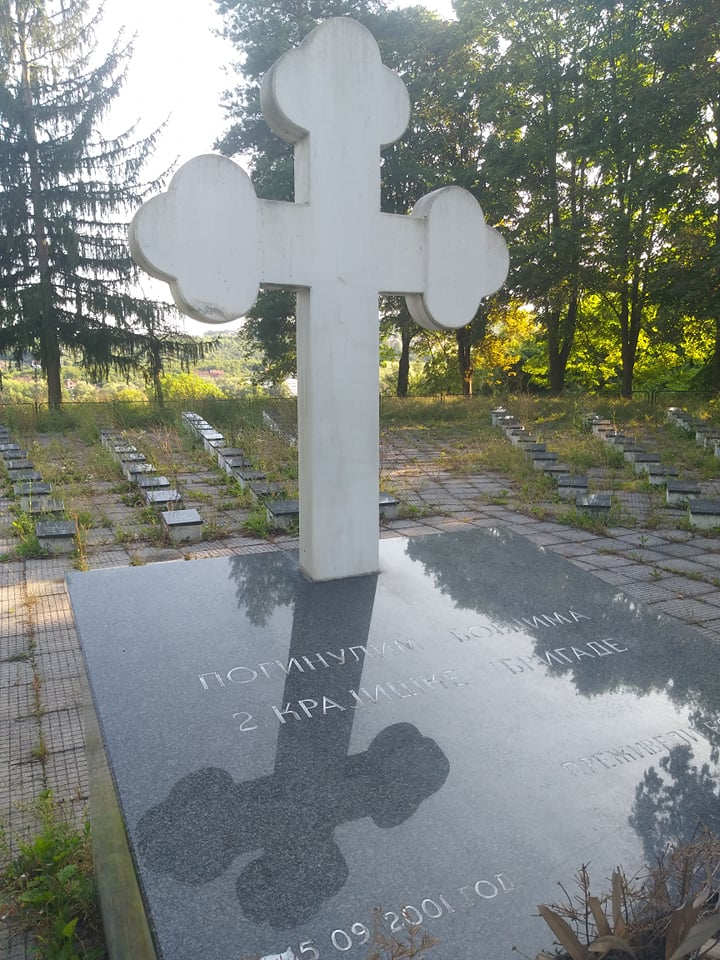
Monument to the fallen fighters of 2nd Krajina Brigade

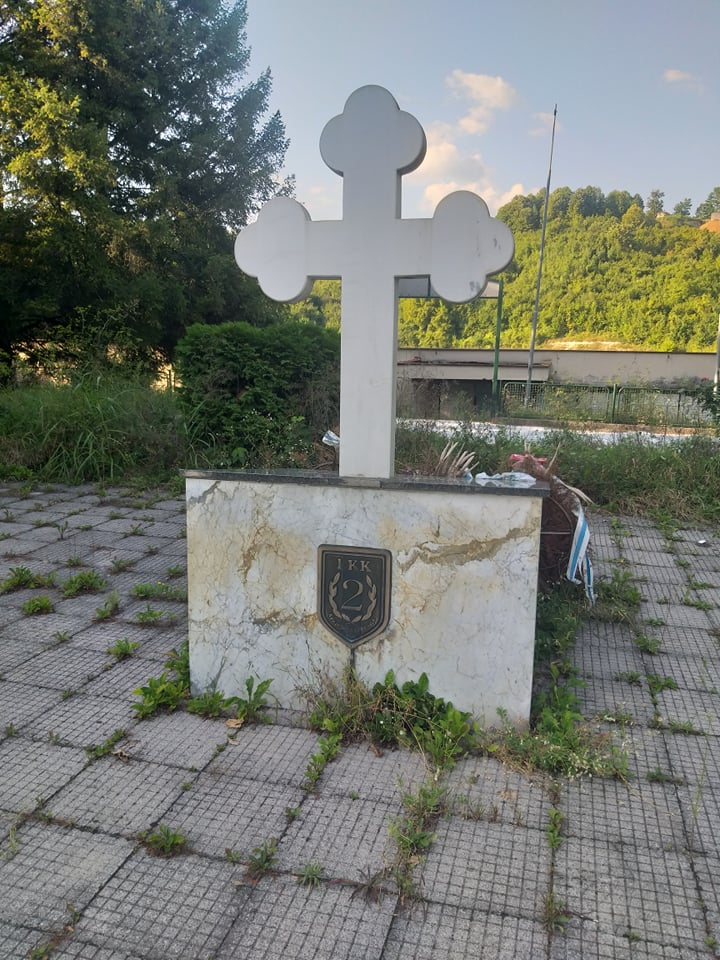
Monument from back side

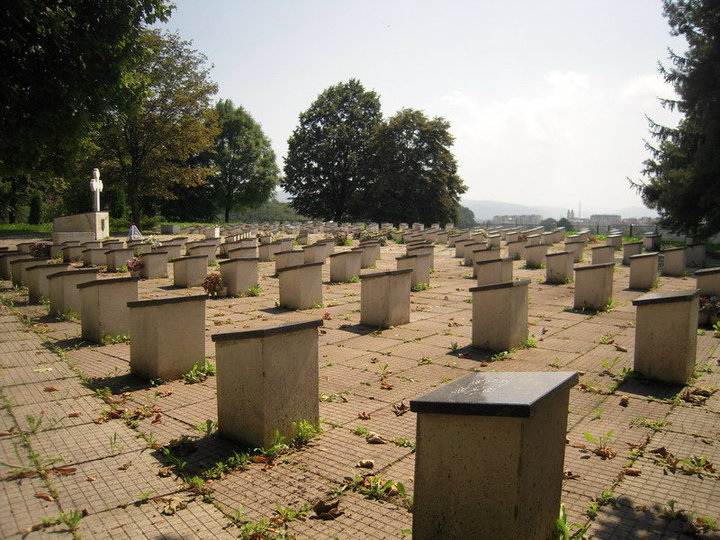
Marble posts with names of the fallen soldiers (in image description there are names of the fallen soldiers)

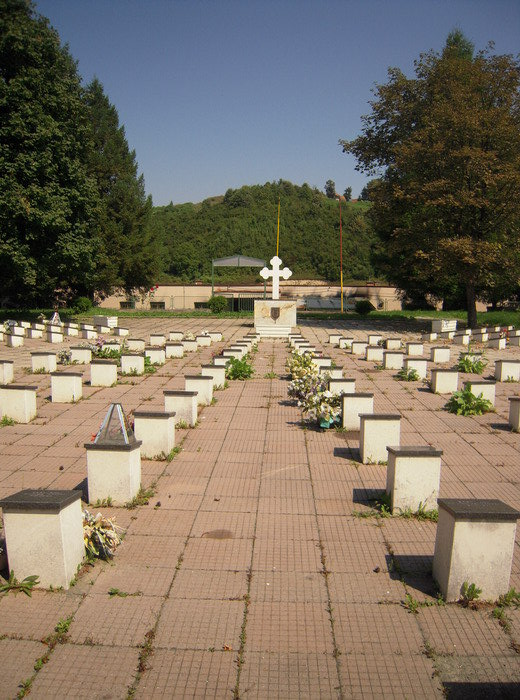
Memorial Center
