= Pivare =

- Village
- Location within Croatia
- Country: Croatia
- County: Brod-Posavina County
- Municipality: Stara Gradiška

Area
  - Total: 3.5 km^{2} (1.4 sq mi)

Population (2021)
  - Total: 20
  - Density: 5.7/km^{2} (15/sq mi)
- Time zone: UTC+1 (CET)
  - Summer (DST): UTC+2 (CEST)

Pivare is a village in Croatia.
