= Velika Barna =

Village in Croatia

- Village
- Location within Croatia
- Country: Croatia
- County: Bjelovar-Bilogora County
- Municipality: Grubišno Polje

Area
  - Total: 12.5 sq mi (32.3 km^{2})

Population (2021)
  - Total: 246
  - Density: 19.7/sq mi (7.62/km^{2})
- Time zone: UTC+1 (CET)
  - Summer (DST): UTC+2 (CEST)

Velika Barna is a village in Croatia.

== Demographics ==
According to the 2021 census, its population was 246. It was 335 in 2011.
