= Mala Barna =

- Village
- Location within Croatia
- Coordinates: 45.7417596°N 17.196435°E
- Country: Croatia
- County: Bjelovar-Bilogora County
- Municipality: Grubišno Polje

Area
  - Total: 1.3 sq mi (3.3 km^{2})

Population (2021)
  - Total: 28
  - Density: 22/sq mi (8.5/km^{2})
- Time zone: UTC+1 (CET)
  - Summer (DST): UTC+2 (CEST)

Mala Barna is a village in Croatia.

== Demographics ==
According to the 2021 census, its population was 28.
