= Gornja Rašenica =

- Village
- Location within Croatia
- Coordinates: 45.6934293°N 17.1974558°E
- Country: Croatia
- County: Bjelovar-Bilogora County
- Municipality: Grubišno Polje

Area
  - Total: 1.9 sq mi (4.9 km^{2})

Population (2021)
  - Total: 65
  - Density: 34/sq mi (13/km^{2})
- Time zone: UTC+1 (CET)
  - Summer (DST): UTC+2 (CEST)

Gornja Rašenica is a village in Croatia.

== Demographics ==
According to the 2021 census, its population was 65.
