= Dapčevački Brđani =

- Village
- Location within Croatia
- Coordinates: 45.7282795°N 17.2335073°E
- Country: Croatia
- County: Bjelovar-Bilogora County
- Municipality: Grubišno Polje

Area
  - Total: 2.2 sq mi (5.6 km^{2})

Population (2021)
  - Total: 41
  - Density: 19/sq mi (7.3/km^{2})
- Time zone: UTC+1 (CET)
  - Summer (DST): UTC+2 (CEST)

Dapčevački Brđani is a village in Croatia.

== Demographics ==
According to the 2021 census, its population was 41.
