= Velika Dapčevica =

- Village
- Location within Croatia
- Country: Croatia
- County: Bjelovar-Bilogora County
- Municipality: Grubišno Polje

Area
  - Total: 3.3 sq mi (8.5 km^{2})

Population (2021)
  - Total: 30
  - Density: 9.1/sq mi (3.5/km^{2})
- Time zone: UTC+1 (CET)
  - Summer (DST): UTC+2 (CEST)

Velika Dapčevica is a village in Croatia. It is connected by the D5 highway.

== Demographics ==
According to the 2021 census, its population was 30.
