= Gornji Bogićevci =

- Municipality
- Interactive map of Gornji Bogićevci
- Location of Gornji Bogićevci in Croatia
- Coordinates: 45°16′N 17°14′E
- Country: Croatia
- County: Brod-Posavina County

Government
  - Mayor: Pavo Klarić (HDZ)

Area
  - Municipality: 41.8 km^{2} (16.1 sq mi)
  - Urban: 6.7 km^{2} (2.6 sq mi)

Population (2021)
  - Municipality: 1,428
  - Density: 34.2/km^{2} (88.5/sq mi)
  - Urban: 538
  - Urban density: 80/km^{2} (210/sq mi)
- Postal code: 35430 Okučani
- Website: opcinagornjibogicevci.hr

Gornji Bogićevci is a village and a municipality in the Brod-Posavina County, Croatia.

== Demographics ==
In 2021, the municipality had 1,428 residents in the following settlements:

- Dubovac, population 262
- Gornji Bogićevci, population 538
- Kosovac, population 135
- Ratkovac, population 146
- Smrtić, population 197
- Trnava, population 150
Gornji Bogićevci: Population trends 1857–2021
v

population	1352	1486	1432	1921	2202	2628	2872	3339	2920	2919	3142	3217	3095	2900	2319	1975	1428
	1857	1869	1880	1890	1900	1910	1921	1931	1948	1953	1961	1971	1981	1991	2001	2011	2021

Sources: Croatian Bureau of Statistics publications

In 2011, 89% of the people were Croats.

== Politics ==
=== Minority councils ===
Directly elected minority councils and representatives are tasked with consulting tasks for the local or regional authorities in which they are advocating for minority rights and interests, integration into public life and participation in the management of local affairs. At the 2023 Croatian national minorities councils and representatives elections Serbs of Croatia fulfilled legal requirements to elect 10 members minority councils of the Municipality of Gordnji Bogićevci.

== Notable people ==
- Grigor Vitez, born in Kosovac
