= Kapela Dvor =

Coordinates: 45°53′20″N 17°25′08″E

- Village
- Interactive map of Kapela Dvor
- Country: Croatia
- County: Virovitica-Podravina County
- Municipality: Lukač

Area
  - Total: 1.6 km^{2} (0.62 sq mi)

Population (2021)
  - Total: 204
  - Density: 130/km^{2} (330/sq mi)
- Time zone: UTC+1 (CET)
  - Summer (DST): UTC+2 (CEST)

Kapela Dvor is a village in Croatia. It is connected by the D5 highway.
