= Lončarica =

- Village
- Location within Croatia
- Country: Croatia
- County: Bjelovar-Bilogora County
- Municipality: Grubišno Polje

Area
  - Total: 5.6 sq mi (14.5 km^{2})

Population (2021)
  - Total: 62
  - Density: 11/sq mi (4.3/km^{2})
- Time zone: UTC+1 (CET)
  - Summer (DST): UTC+2 (CEST)

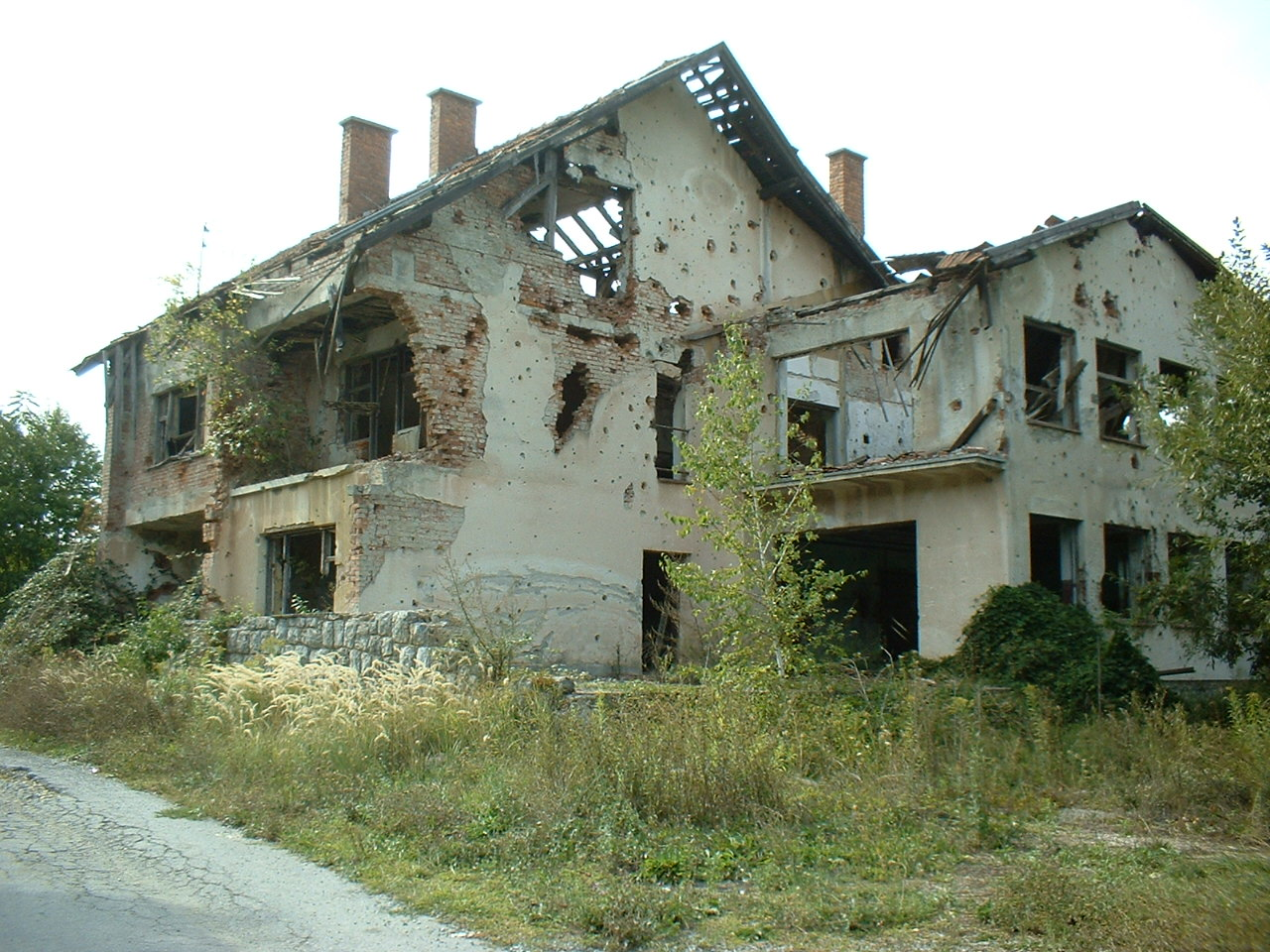
Building in Lončarica damaged in the 1991 war. Former location of the UNPROFOR WA 7 Check Point.

Lončarica is a village in Croatia. It is off of the D5 highway, located between the towns of Grubisno Polje and Verovitica.

== Demographics ==
According to the 2021 census, its population was 62.
