= Veliki Zdenci =

- Village
- Location within Croatia
- Country: Croatia
- County: Bjelovar-Bilogora County
- Municipality: Grubišno Polje

Area
  - Total: 10.8 sq mi (27.9 km^{2})

Population (2021)
  - Total: 727
  - Density: 67.5/sq mi (26.1/km^{2})
- Time zone: UTC+1 (CET)
  - Summer (DST): UTC+2 (CEST)
- Postal code: 43293 Veliki Zdenci
- Area code: +385 (0)43

Veliki Zdenci is a village in Croatia that administratively belongs to the town of Grubišno Polje. It's located about 30 km south of Virovitica and about 20 km north of Garešnica in Bjelovar-Bilogora county. It is connected by the D5 highway. Beside the village flows the Ilova river.

== Demographics ==
According to the 2021 census, the village population was 727, down from 914 inhabitants in 2011.
