= Rit, Croatia =

Settlement in Virovitica-Podravina County, Croatia

Rit
- Settlement
- Interactive map of Rit
- Location of Rit in Croatia
- Coordinates: 45°54′07″N 17°27′54″E
- Country: Croatia
- County: Virovitica-Podravina
- Municipality: Lukač

Area
  - Total: 1.8 km^{2} (0.69 sq mi)

Population (2021)
  - Total: 29
  - Density: 16/km^{2} (42/sq mi)
- Time zone: UTC+1 (CET)
  - Summer (DST): UTC+2 (CEST)
- Postal code: 33000 Virovitica
- Area code: +385 (0)33

Rit is a settlement in the Municipality of Lukač in Croatia. In 2021, its population was 29.

== Demographics ==
Rit: Population trends 1857–2021
v

population			117	111	137	126	104	86	101	103	115	95	74	69	63	38	29
	1857	1869	1880	1890	1900	1910	1921	1931	1948	1953	1961	1971	1981	1991	2001	2011	2021

Sources: Croatian Bureau of Statistics publications
