= Sirač =

- Municipality
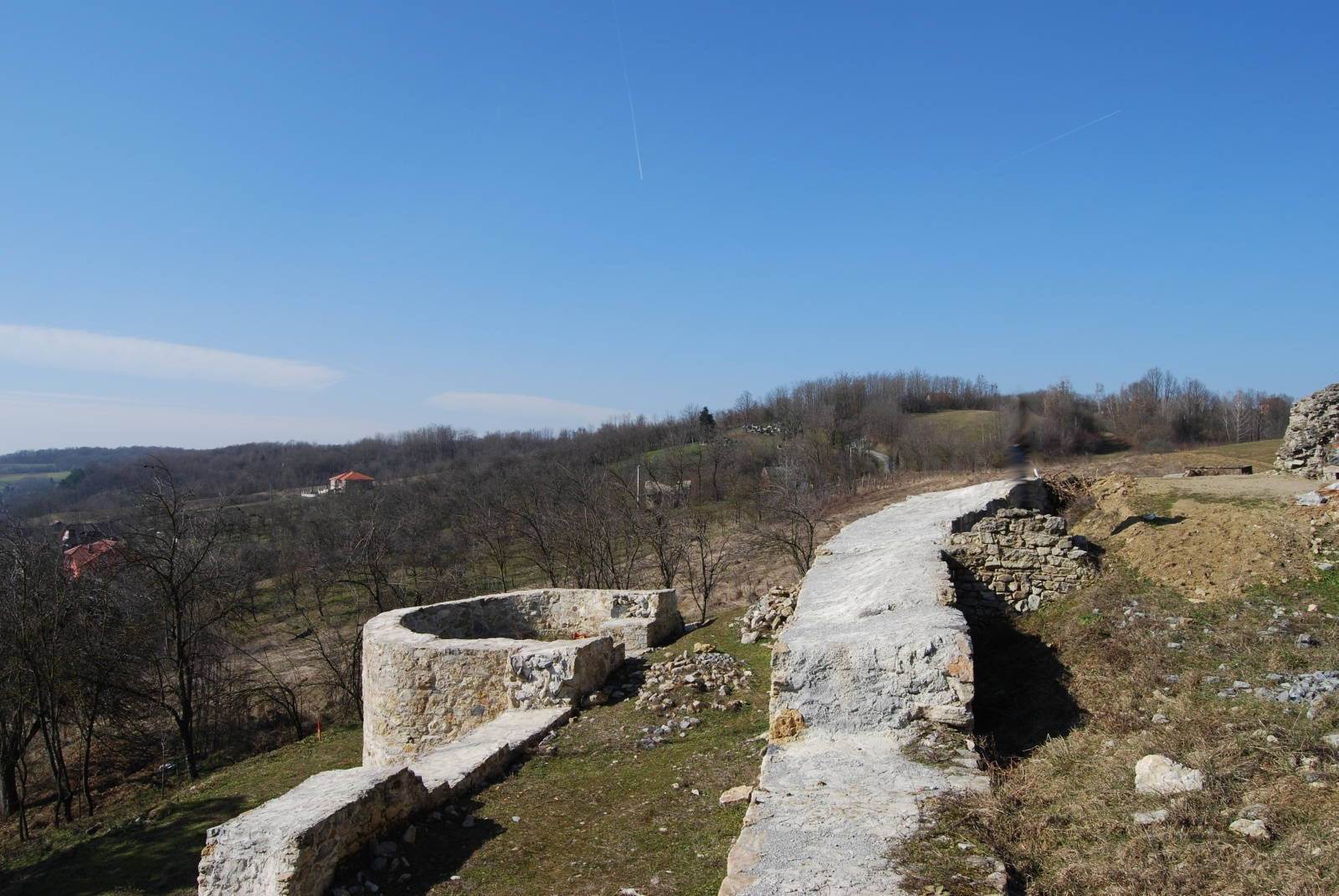
- Ruins in Sirač
- Interactive map of Sirač
- Location within Croatia
- Country: Croatia
- County: Bjelovar-Bilogora County

Government
  - Mayor: Igor Supan (HSS)

Area
  - Total: 10.7 sq mi (27.8 km^{2})

Population (2021)
  - Total: 1,152
  - Density: 107/sq mi (41.4/km^{2})
- Time zone: UTC+1 (CET)
  - Summer (DST): UTC+2 (CEST)

Sirač (Hungarian: Szircs or Szirács; German: Siratsch) is a settlement and municipality in Bjelovar-Bilogora County, Croatia.

== History ==
It is believed that the settlement of Gornji Borki contains a mass grave from World War II, though no exhumation has been carried out.

== Demographics ==
According to the 2021 census, the population of the municipality was 1,796, with 1,152 living in the town proper. In 2011, there were 2,218 inhabitants; 73% Croats, 14% Serbs, and 11% Czechs. The following settlements make up the municipality: Barica, Bijela, Donji Borki, Gornji Borki, Kip, Miljanovac, Pakrani, Sirač, Šibovac.

The municipality consists of the following settlements:

- Orovac, population 253
- Severin, population 449
Severin: Population trends 1857–2021
v

population	972	1149	1137	1460	1654	1889	1968	2021	1812	1742	1678	1483	1295	1111	1038	877	702
	1857	1869	1880	1890	1900	1910	1921	1931	1948	1953	1961	1971	1981	1991	2001	2011	2021

Sources: Croatian Bureau of Statistics publications

== Politics ==
=== Minority councils and representatives ===
Directly elected minority councils and representatives are tasked with consulting tasks for the local or regional authorities in which they advocate for minority rights and interests, integration into public life and participation in the management of local affairs. At the 2023 Croatian national minorities councils and representatives elections, Czechs, Germans and Serbs of Croatia each fulfilled legal requirements to elect their own 10 members minority councils of the Municipality of Sirač.

== Notable people ==
- Josip Reihl-Kir
- Dragomir Čumić
