= Šibovac =

- Village
- Location within Croatia
- Country: Croatia
- County: Bjelovar-Bilogora County
- Municipality: Sirač

Area
  - Total: 2.4 sq mi (6.1 km^{2})

Population (2021)
  - Total: 182
  - Density: 77/sq mi (30/km^{2})
- Time zone: UTC+1 (CET)
  - Summer (DST): UTC+2 (CEST)

Šibovac is a village in Croatia.

== Demographics ==
According to the 2021 census, its population was 182.
