= Reet (given name) =

Female given name

- Gender: Female
- Language: Estonian
- Name day: 13 July

Origin
- Region of origin: Estonia

Other names
- Derived: From Margareeta
- Related names: Greta, Grete, Kreet, Kreeta, Mare, Maret, Mareta, Marge, Margit, Marit, Marita, Meeta, Meta, Reeda

Reet is an Estonian feminine given name. It is a variant and often a diminutive of the given name Margareeta, a cognate of Margaret.

As of 1 January 2021, 2,833 women in Estonia have the first name Reet, making it the 46th most popular female name in the country. The name is most commonly found in Viljandi County, where 32.43 per 10,000 inhabitants of the county bear the name.

Individuals bearing the name Reet include:

- Reet Aus (born 1974), Estonian fashion, theatre and film artist
- Helle-Reet Helenurm (1944–2003), Estonian actress
- Reet Jürvetson (1950–1969), Estonian-Canadian murder victim
- Reet Kasik (born 1946), Estonian linguist
- Reet Krusten (1934–2021), Estonian literary scholar
- Reet Linna (born 1944), Estonian TV and radio journalist, singer and lyricist
- Reet Palm (born 1959), Estonian rower and coach
- Reet Roos (born 1973), Estonian politician
- Reet Valgmaa (born 1952), Estonian badminton player
