= Dubovac, Brod-Posavina County =

Dubovac
- Interactive map of Dubovac
- Coordinates: 45°14′26″N 17°12′18″E

Dubovac is a village near Gornji Bogićevci, Croatia. In the 2011 census, it had 378 inhabitants.
