= Bijela Stijena =

Coordinates: 45°21′N 17°12′E

- Village
- Interactive map of Bijela Stijena
- Country: Croatia

Area
  - Total: 4.8 km^{2} (1.9 sq mi)

Population (2021)
  - Total: 7
  - Density: 1.5/km^{2} (3.8/sq mi)
- Time zone: UTC+1 (CET)
  - Summer (DST): UTC+2 (CEST)

Bijela Stijena is a village in Croatia. It is connected by the D5 highway.
