= Grbavac, Bjelovar-Bilogora County =

Grbavac
- Village
- Location within Croatia
- Country: Croatia
- County: Bjelovar-Bilogora County
- Municipality: Grubišno Polje

Area
  - Total: 2.4 sq mi (6.2 km^{2})

Population (2021)
  - Total: 145
  - Density: 61/sq mi (23/km^{2})
- Time zone: UTC+1 (CET)
  - Summer (DST): UTC+2 (CEST)

Grbavac is a village in Croatia.

== Demographics ==
According to the 2021 census, its population was 145. It was 211 in 2011.
