= Cage, Croatia =

Coordinates: 45°17′N 17°13′E

Cage
- Village
- Interactive map of Cage
- Country: Croatia

Area
  - Total: 4.4 km^{2} (1.7 sq mi)

Population (2021)
  - Total: 290
  - Density: 66/km^{2} (170/sq mi)
- Time zone: UTC+1 (CET)
  - Summer (DST): UTC+2 (CEST)

Cage is a village in Croatia. It is connected by the D5 highway.
