= Rastovac, Grubišno Polje =

Rastovac
- Village
- Location within Croatia
- Coordinates: 45.6841852°N 17.2564542°E
- Country: Croatia
- County: Bjelovar-Bilogora County
- Municipality: Grubišno Polje

Area
  - Total: 2.7 sq mi (7.0 km^{2})

Population (2021)
  - Total: 27
  - Density: 10/sq mi (3.9/km^{2})
- Time zone: UTC+1 (CET)
  - Summer (DST): UTC+2 (CEST)

Rastovac is a village in Croatia.

== Demographics ==
According to the 2021 census, its population was 27.
