= Drakulić =

.

Drakulić is a Serbian surname, derived from the Greek δράκων (drakōn) and its Latin cognate draco (dragons). Dragons play a significant role in Greek and Serbian mythology.

- Saša Drakulić (born 1972), Serbian footballer
- Slavenka Drakulić (1949-2026), Croatian writer and publicist
