= Brusnica, Maglaj =

Village in Maglaj, Bosnia and Herzegovina

Brusnica
- Village
- Location within Bosnia and Herzegovina
- Coordinates: 44°35′04″N 18°08′14″E
- Country: Bosnia and Herzegovina
- Entity: Federation of Bosnia and Herzegovina
- Canton: Zenica-Doboj
- Municipality: Maglaj

Area
  - Total: 2.80 sq mi (7.25 km^{2})

Population (2013)
  - Total: 9
  - Density: 3.2/sq mi (1.2/km^{2})
- Time zone: UTC+1 (CET)
  - Summer (DST): UTC+2 (CEST)

Brusnica is a village in the municipality of Maglaj, Bosnia and Herzegovina.

== Demographics ==
According to the 2013 census, its population was 9, all Serbs.
