= Writ (disambiguation) =

A writ is a legal document.

Writ may also refer to:

- Writ of election, a writ issued by a state ordering that an election be held
- Writ (website), an online legal commentary
- Ogg Writ, a text-phrase codec
- "The Writ" (also appears as "The Writ/Blow on a Jug"), a song from Black Sabbath's 1975 album Sabotage
- Holy Writ, an old-fashioned term for the Bible and other religious texts
- WRIT-FM, a variety hits radio station in Milwaukee, Wisconsin
- WRIT (Welsh Rates of Income Tax), a Welsh income tax for people living in Wales.
