= Rit (dye) =

Brand of dye

Rit is an American brand of dye first sold in 1916. It is owned by Nakoma Products.

Rit is a commercial dye used for household purposes, including dyeing clothes and wood. It is sold in solid and powdered forms. The items being dyed are soaked with Rit in hot water.

Cloth dyed with Rit can be undyed with Rit Color Remover.
