= Turanovac =

Coordinates: 45°54′N 17°24′E

- Village
- Interactive map of Turanovac
- Country: Croatia
- County: Virovitica-Podravina County
- Municipality: Lukač

Area
  - Total: 19.9 km^{2} (7.7 sq mi)

Population (2021)
  - Total: 563
  - Density: 28.3/km^{2} (73.3/sq mi)
- Time zone: UTC+1 (CET)
  - Summer (DST): UTC+2 (CEST)

Turanovac is a village in Croatia.
