= Uskoci, Croatia =

Uskoci
- Location within Croatia
- Coordinates: 45°08′52″N 17°13′44″E
- Country: Croatia
- County: Brod-Posavina
- Municipality: Stara Gradiška

Area
  - Total: 2.9 km^{2} (1.1 sq mi)

Population (2021)
  - Total: 71
  - Density: 24/km^{2} (63/sq mi)
- Time zone: UTC+1 (CET)
  - Summer (DST): UTC+2 (CEST)

Uskoci is a village near Stara Gradiška, Croatia, population 100 (census 2011).

== See also ==
- Uskoks (Uskoci), irregular soldiers in Habsburg Croatia during the Ottoman wars in Europe
