= Grubišno Polje =

- Town
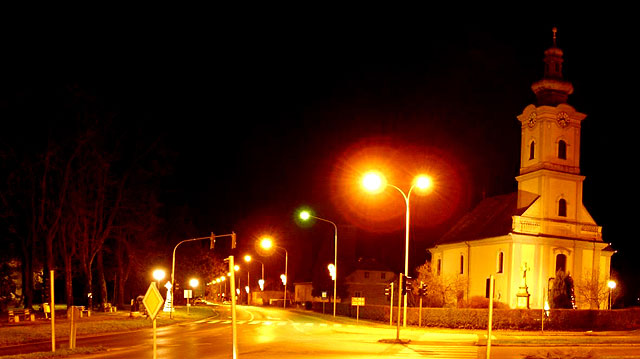
- Church of Saint Joseph in the town center

- Location of Grubišno Polje in Croatia
- Coordinates: 45°42′08″N 17°10′20″E
- Country: Croatia
- Region: Central Croatia (Bilogora)
- County: Bjelovar-Bilogora County

Government
  - Mayor: Zlatko Pavičić (HDZ)

Area
  - Town: 265.2 km^{2} (102.4 sq mi)
  - Urban: 26.9 km^{2} (10.4 sq mi)
- Elevation: 165 m (541 ft)

Population (2021)
  - Town: 5,367
  - Density: 20.24/km^{2} (52.42/sq mi)
  - Urban: 2,588
  - Urban density: 96.2/km^{2} (249/sq mi)
- Time zone: UTC+1 (CET)
  - Summer (DST): UTC+2 (CEST)
- Website: grubisnopolje.hr

Grubišno Polje (Czech: Hrubečné Pole, Hungarian: Grobosinc, German: Poglack) is a town in Bjelovar-Bilogora County, Croatia.

== Demographics ==
In the 1991 census, the settlement had equal numbers of Serbs and Croatians, but during the Croatian War of Independence the Croatian Serbs largely left the town, and only part of them returned later in the 1990s.

In the 2001 census, the municipality had 7,523 inhabitants, with the following ethnic makeup:

- 4,692 (62.37%) Croats
- 1,356 (18.02%) Czechs
- 872 (11.56%) Serbs
- 228 (3.03%) Hungarians
Town of Grubišno Polje: Population trends 1857–2021
v

population	6930	8119	9069	12664	14785	15809	15532	16101	13037	13792	13370	11772	10506	9716	7523	6478	5367
	1857	1869	1880	1890	1900	1910	1921	1931	1948	1953	1961	1971	1981	1991	2001	2011	2021

Sources: Croatian Bureau of Statistics publications

== Politics ==
=== Minority councils and representatives ===
Directly elected minority councils and representatives are tasked with consulting tasks for the local or regional authorities in which they are advocating for minority rights and interests, integration into public life and participation in the management of local affairs. At the 2023 Croatian national minorities councils and representatives elections Czechs, Hungarians, Roma and Serbs of Croatia each fulfilled legal requirements to elect their own 15 members minority council of the Town of Grubišno Polje with Serb community electing 14 members into their council.

== History ==
In the late 19th and early 20th century, Grubišno Polje was a district capital in the Bjelovar-Križevci County of the Kingdom of Croatia-Slavonia.

== Sights ==
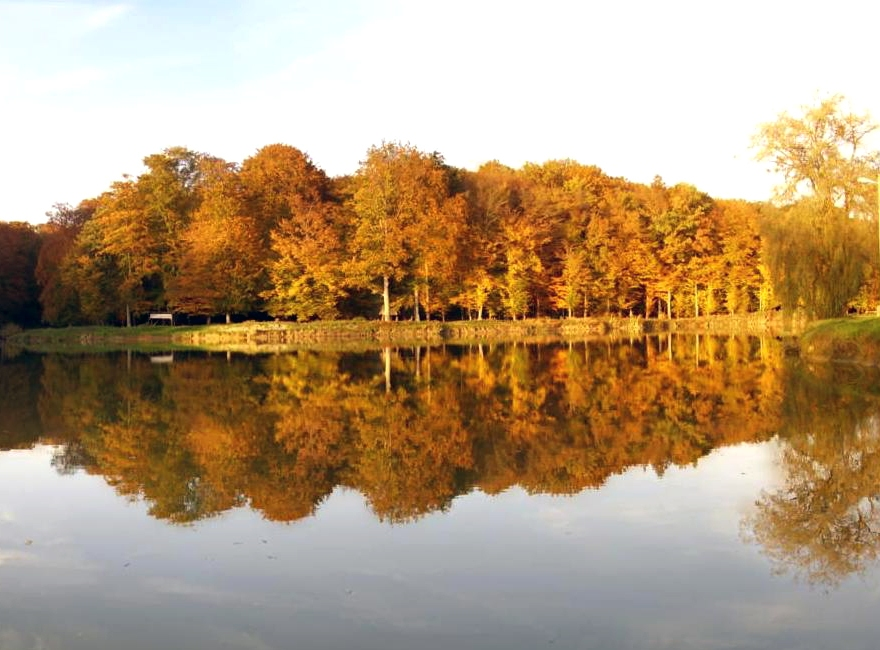
Bara excursion site

The town has a memorial to its deceased from the Croatian War of Independence.

== Settlements ==
The administrativne area of the Town consists of 24 settlements (as of 2011), namely:

- Dapčevački Brđani, population 50
- Dijakovac, population 32
- Donja Rašenica, population 164
- Gornja Rašenica, population 89
- Grbavac, population 211
- Grubišno Polje, population 2,917
- Ivanovo Selo, population 264
- Lončarica, population 79
- Mala Barna, population 30
- Mala Dapčevica, population 3
- Mala Jasenovača, population 5
- Mala Peratovica, population 65
- Mali Zdenci, population 436
- Munije, population 35
- Orlovac Zdenački, population 285
- Poljani, population 261
- Rastovac, population 40
- Treglava, population 103
- Turčević Polje, population 44
- Velika Barna, population 335
- Velika Dapčevica, population 32
- Velika Jasenovača, population 58
- Velika Peratovica, population 26
- Veliki Zdenci, population 914
