= Reet SK =

Belgian football club

K Reet SK
- Full name: Koninklijke Reet Sportkring (Royal Reet Sport Society)
- Nickname: De Koninklijke (The Royals)
- Founded: 1945; 81 years ago
- Ground: terrein Reet SK, Reet
- Coordinates: 51°6′12.82″N 4°24′31.72″E
- Head coach: Peter Schrauwen
- League: Belgian Provincial League Antwerp 3rd Division B
- Website: https://www.kreetsk.be/
Home colours	Away colours

The Koninklijke Reet Sportkring (Reet SK) meaning "Royal Reet Sport Society" is a Belgian association football club based in Reet, Rumst in the province of Antwerp. It is currently playing in the third division of the Belgian Provincial leagues third division of the Antwerp province.

== History ==
The club was founded in 1945 and joined the Belgian Football Association in 1946 to receive the matricule no. 4423. The club opted to play in yellow and red as they are the predominant colours in the town's coat of arms. The coat of arms can also be seen in the club's logo.

== Home ground ==
The home games are played at the club's own stadium in Reet located at the Processieweg road. The stadium does not have a name. Currently the club makes use of three full sized football pitches. Two are used for official matches and one is a training ground only. Two pitches have floodlights for training or evening matches.

== Rivalry ==
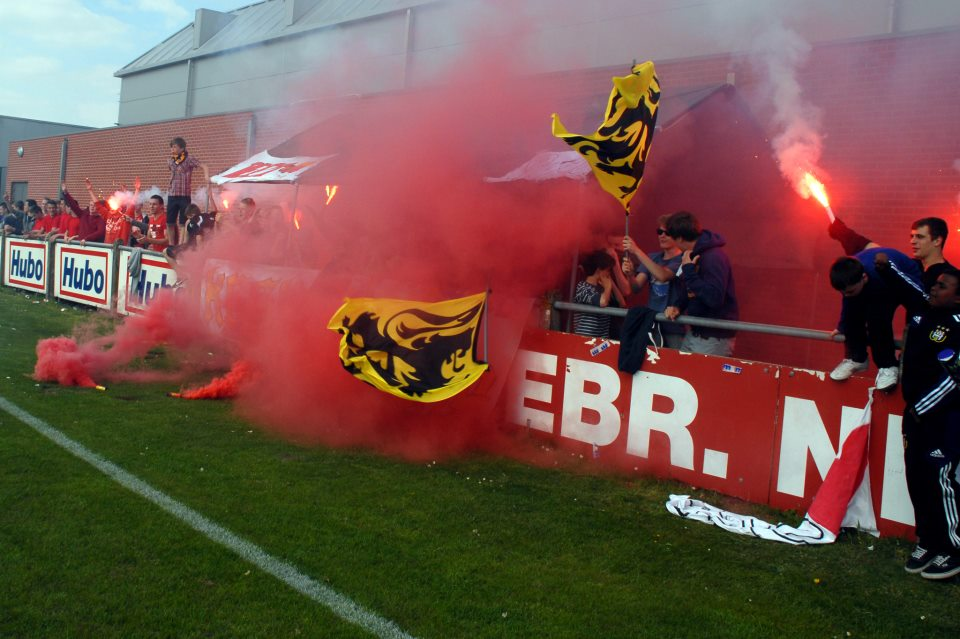
Reet SK fans celebrate during 'Reet SK – Rumstse SK' 1 May 2013

Reet SK has a long-standing rivalry with Rumstse SK with whom it contests the Rumst Derby. Both teams are located in the municipality of Rumst, however the towns only merged in 1976 so this merger only happened long after both teams were founded.

The latest Rumst Derby was played on 1 May 2013 and marked the final game of the season 2012/2013. It was a title deciding game as Reet SK could clinch the title if it did not lose. After a real cup-tie Reet SK held on to a goalless draw and celebrated promotion to Belgian Provincial leagues third division.
