= Vrbovljani =

Coordinates: 45°15′N 17°10′E

- Village
- Interactive map of Vrbovljani
- Country: Croatia
- County: Brod-Posavina County

Area
  - Total: 15.2 km^{2} (5.9 sq mi)

Population (2021)
  - Total: 135
  - Density: 8.88/km^{2} (23.0/sq mi)
- Time zone: UTC+1 (CET)
  - Summer (DST): UTC+2 (CEST)

Vrbovljani is a village in Croatia.
