= Lukač, Croatia =

Village and municipality in Croatia

Lukač
- Location within Croatia
- Coordinates: 45°52′12″N 17°25′12″E
- Country: Croatia
- County: Virovitica-Podravina County

Area
  - Total: 82.9 km^{2} (32.0 sq mi)

Population (2021)
  - Total: 2,759
  - Density: 33.3/km^{2} (86.2/sq mi)
- Time zone: UTC+1 (CET)
  - Summer (DST): UTC+2 (CEST)
- Website: opcina-lukac.hr

Lukač (German: Lukasdorf) is a village and municipality in Podravina, in the Virovitica-Podravina County of Croatia.

In the 2011 census, the municipality had a total population of 3,634, in the following settlements:

- Brezik, population 213
- Budrovac Lukački, population 138
- Dugo Selo Lukačko, population 570
- Gornje Bazje, population 498
- Kapela Dvor, population 259
- Katinka, population 41
- Lukač, population 443
- Rit, population 38
- Terezino Polje, population 269
- Turanovac, population 695
- Veliko Polje, population 341
- Zrinj Lukački, population 129

In the 2001 census, 92% were Croats.

== History ==
In the late 19th and early 20th century, Lukač was part of the Virovitica County of the Kingdom of Croatia-Slavonia.

Colonist settlements of Ada, Brezovo Polje, Neteča, Rit, and Zrinj were established on the territory of the village municipality during the land reform in interwar Yugoslavia.

== Politics ==
=== Minority councils ===
Directly elected minority councils and representatives are tasked with consulting tasks for the local or regional authorities in which they are advocating for minority rights and interests, integration into public life and participation in the management of local affairs. At the 2023 Croatian national minorities councils and representatives elections Serbs of Croatia fulfilled legal requirements to elect 10 members minority councils of the Municipality of Lukač.
