= Orlovac Zdenački =

- Village
- Interactive map of Orlovac Zdenački
- Location within Croatia
- Coordinates: 45.6898882°N 17.1162696°E
- Country: Croatia
- County: Bjelovar-Bilogora County
- Municipality: Grubišno Polje

Area
  - Total: 1.7 sq mi (4.3 km^{2})

Population (2021)
  - Total: 248
  - Density: 150/sq mi (58/km^{2})
- Time zone: UTC+1 (CET)
  - Summer (DST): UTC+2 (CEST)

Orlovac Zdenački is a village in Croatia.

== Demographics ==
According to the 2021 census, its population was 248.
