= Donji Varoš =

Coordinates: 45°09′22″N 17°15′11″E

- Village
- Interactive map of Donji Varoš
- Country: Croatia
- County: Brod-Posavina County

Area
  - Total: 6.7 km^{2} (2.6 sq mi)

Population (2021)
  - Total: 206
  - Density: 31/km^{2} (80/sq mi)
- Time zone: UTC+1 (CET)
  - Summer (DST): UTC+2 (CEST)

Donji Varoš is a village in Croatia.
