= Gornji Varoš =

Coordinates: 45°09′N 17°13′E

- Village
- Interactive map of Gornji Varoš
- Country: Croatia
- County: Brod-Posavina County

Area
  - Total: 23.8 km^{2} (9.2 sq mi)

Population (2021)
  - Total: 189
  - Density: 7.94/km^{2} (20.6/sq mi)
- Time zone: UTC+1 (CET)
  - Summer (DST): UTC+2 (CEST)

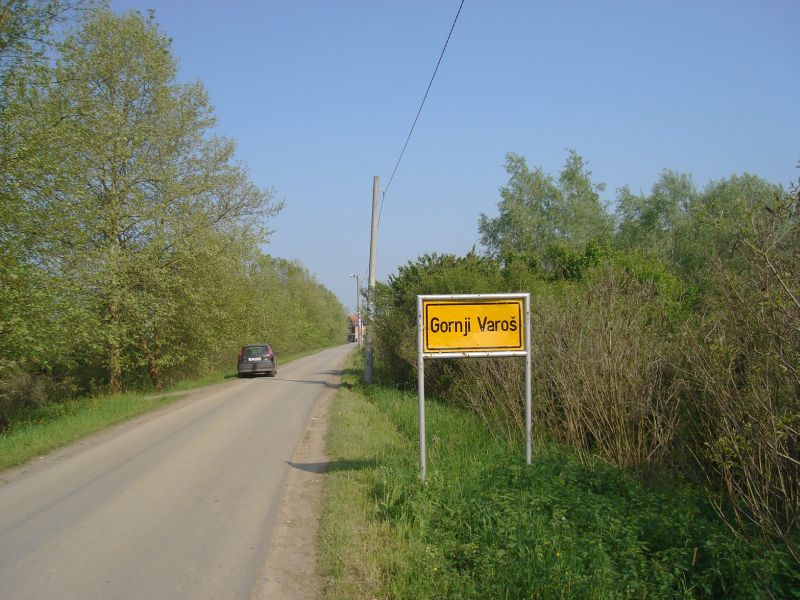
Sign for the village

Gornji Varoš is a village in Croatia.
