= List of massacres during the Croatian War of Independence =

The following is a list of massacres that occurred in the Croatian War of Independence. Numbers may be approximate.

Name	Date	Location	Deaths	Notes
Borovo Selo massacre	2 May 1991	Borovo Selo	12	Croatian policemen killed at Borovo Selo by Serb paramilitaries. Some of them were found to have been mutilated, their ears cut, their eyes gouged out and their throats slit.
Killings of Serbs in Vukovar	May–July 1991	Vukovar and surroundings	43–120	Kidnappings and summary executions of ethnic Serbs living in and near Vukovar during the summer of 1991 by forces associated with the Croatian National Guard under the command of Tomislav Merčep.
Sisak killings	July 1991 – June 1992	Sisak	24–107	Illegal detainment, torture and killings of at least 24 Serbian civilians from Sisak by members of the HV and police forces. Other reports claim that up to 107 Serbian civilians were murdered or disappeared during this time period
Tenja massacre	July–November 1991	Tenja	29	Members of the Serbian Volunteer Guard, Yugoslav People's Army (JNA) forces, and local Serb Territorial Defense (TO) and police units killed 29 Croat civilians the village of Tenja.
Osijek killings	July–December 1991	Osijek	11	Serb civilians killed by Croat paramilitaries, led by Branimir Glavaš.
Operation Stinger	26–27 July 1991	Banovina	22	Forces of the SAO Krajina, an unrecognized Croatian Serb region, killed 22 Croat civilians as well as captured policemen in Glina, Kozibrod and Struga, where the rebel Serb forces employed a human shield consisting of Croat civilians taken from their homes in Struga and the nearby village of Zamlača.
Struga and Kuljani killings	26 July 1991	Struga and Kuljani, near Dvor	17	Rebel Serb forces killed seventeen Croat civilians in Struga and Kuljani, near Dvor. This is reportedly believed to be the first mass-killings of civilians during the Croatian War of Independence.
Dvor medical centre massacre	26 July 1991	Dvor	10	SAO Krajina forces killed eight wounded Croat civilians and two police officers who were being treated at a medical centre during the capture of Dvor.
Aljmaš massacre	August 1991	Aljmaš	58	JNA forces from the 51st Mechanised Brigade killed 58 Croat civilians after capturing Aljmaš.
Dalj massacre	1 August 1991 – May 1992	Dalj	135	SAO Krajina forces, TO units and Serbian Volunteer Guard members massacre Croatian police and Croatian National Guard (ZNG) POWs, Croat and Hungarian civilians.
Sarvaš massacre	2 August 1991	Sarvaš	9	Croatian police and ZNG forces massacre 9 Serb civilians after attacking the village.
Lovinac massacre	8 August 1991	Lovinac	5	SAO Krajina paramilitary units massacred 5 elderly Croat civilians in Lovinac.
Kraljevčani and Pecki killings	14 and 16 August 1991	Kraljevčani and Pecki, near Petrinja	9	Serb paramilitaries killed five Croat civilians in Kraljevčani and then another four Croat civilians in nearby Pecki.
Banija killings	22 August 1991	Blinjski Kut and neighbouring villages	15	ZNG forces killed 15 Serb civilians and POWs.
Skela massacre	29 August 1991	Skela, near Glina	10	10 Croat civilians killed by local Serb rebels.
Berak killings	September 1991	Berak, Croatia	45	45 Croats killed by Serb forces throughout September 1991, during the Battle of Vukovar.
Petrinja killings	September 1991 – June 1992	Petrinja	250+	After the fall of Petrinja to Serb forces in September 1991, more than 250 Croat civilians and POWs were killed during the occupation.
Četekovac massacre	3 September 1991	Četekovac, Balinci, Čoljug, near Podravska Slatina	22	Serb paramilitaries massacred 20 Croat civilians and 2 PoWs.
Sajmište killings	5 September 1991	Sajmište, Vukovar	120	JNA and Serb paramilitaries killed 120 Croat civilians after seizing the Sajmište suburb, during the Battle of Vukovar.
Pakrac killings	6–14 September 1991	Pakrac municipality	176	Croats killed by JNA and Serb paramilitary groups during the occupation of Pakrac and surrounding areas.
Toranj massacre	8 September 1991	Toranj, Mali Banovac, Batinjani, near Pakrac	12	Croat civilians massacred by SAO Krajina rebels.
Kusonje massacre	9 September 1991	Kusonje	7	SAO Krajina forces massacre seven Croat POWs.
Jasenice massacre	11 September 1991	Jasenice and Meki Doci	16	10 elderly Croat civilians from Jasenice and another 6 civilians from the nearby hamlet of Meki Doci were massacred by Serb paramilitaries.
Korana massacre	13 September 1991	Korana, near Karlovac	13	Croat forces massacre thirteen JNA POWs over the Korana bridge, near Karlovac.
Trpinja massacre	14 September–November 1991	Trpinja	24	Croat civilians and POWs massacred by Serb paramilitaries.
Ivanovo Selo massacre	21 September 1991	Ivanovo Selo	7	Seven Czech civilians massacred by Serb paramilitaries.
Svinjarevci massacre	22 September 1991	Svinjarevci	34	Thirty-four Croat civilians killed by the JNA and Serb paramilitaries.
Tovarnik massacre	22 September 1991	Tovarnik	80	JNA forces killed 80 Croat civilians during and after capturing the village of Tovarnik in September 1991.
Grabovac attack	26 September 1991	Grabovac	3 killed, 5 wounded	JNA and rebel Serb mortar attack on a refugee camp near Grabovac killed three Croat civilians (including two children) and wounded five others.
Antin massacre	29 September 1991	Antin and Korođ	27 killed, 10 wounded	A civilian refugee column, fleeing a JNA attack, was deliberately shelled by mortar fire between the villages of Antin and Korođ.
Ravno massacre	1 October 1991	Ravno, near Trebinje, Herzegovina	24–58	Yugoslav People's Army (JNA) Around 450 Serbian soldiers attacked the village of Ravno during operations linked to the siege of Dubrovnik. Homes were destroyed, civilians were killed, and the village was largely razed. A JNA lieutenant colonel later admitted the attack on Montenegrin state television.
Kijev Do Killing	October 1991	Kijev Do, Ravno municipality	8	Eight elderly Croat civilians—seven women and one man—were killed in a targeted operation by JNA units and affiliated forces.
Donji Čaglić massacre	2 October 1991	Donji Čaglić	10	Serb paramilitaries and JNA reservists killed 10 Croat civilians.
Bogdanovci killings	2 October-10 November 1991	Bogdanovci, near Vukovar	87	87 Croat civilians were killed by JNA forces and Serb paramilitary groups, during the occupation of Bogdanovci.
Novo Selo Glinsko massacre	3 and 16 October 1991	Novo Selo Glinsko, near Glina	32	SAO Krajina forces massacred thirty-two Croat civilians in two separate incidents in October 1991, in the village of Novo Selo Glinsko, near Glina.
Lovas killings	10–18 October 1991	Lovas and Opatovac	70	Serb forces killed 70 Croats in the village of Lovas. A total of around 90 Croats were killed in Lovas by Serb forces between October and November 1991.
Borovo Naselje executions	Early-mid October 1991	Borovo Naselje, Vukovar	15	Serbia alleges that ZNG forces tortured and executed 15 Serb civilians in Borovo Naselje who were taken from shelters.
Široka Kula massacre	13 October 1991	Široka Kula, near Gospić	41	SAO Krajina police force massacre of Croat and Serb civilians in the village of Široka Kula.
Gospić massacre	16–18 October 1991	Gospić	100	About 100 Serb civilians massacred by Croatian forces over a period of several days in October 1991.
Baćin massacre	21 October 1991 – February 1992	Baćin, near Hrvatska Dubica	118	SAO Krajina paramilitaries killed 118 civilians, apart from Croats two Serbs.
Tordinci massacre	25 October 1991	Tordinci	22	Twenty-two Croat civilians massacred by the 12th Proletarian Mechanised Brigade of the JNA, supported by Serb paramilitaries
Glinska Poljana massacre	27 October 1991	Glinska Poljana	13	Serb paramilitaries killed 13 Croat civilians.
Lipovača killings	28 October 1991 and 1 January 1992	Lipovača, near Rakovica	12	Serb rebel forces committed two massacres against Croat civilians in Lipovača. Seven civilians (all members of the Brozinčević family) were killed on 28 October 1991, while another five civilians were killed on 1 January 1992.
Požega villages massacre	29 October 1991	Čečavac, Čečavački Vučjak, Jeminovac, Ruševac and Šnjegavić, near Požega	41	Croat forces killed at least 41 Serb civilians across several Serb villages near Požega.
Bapska killings	October–November 1991	Bapska	17	Croatia alleges that SAO Krajina forces killed 17 Croats.
Lužac massacre	2 November 1991	Lužac, near Vukovar	69	Members of the Serbian Paramilitary group, Arkan's Tigers, and JNA forces killed 69 Croat civilians in Lužac, during the Battle of Vukovar.
Staro Selo massacre	4 November 1991	Staro Selo	10	Ten Serb civilians massacred by Croatian forces.
Bizovac attack	7 November 1991	Bizovac	8 killed, 20+ injured	JNA air attack on civilian areas in the centre of Bizovac killed 8 and wounded more than 20 people.
Murder of the Zec family	7 November 1991	Zagreb	3	Ethnic Serb family of three murdered by five Croatian militiamen; two family members survived. The murderers were apprehended, but released after a controversial court decision in 1992. The Croatian government agreed to compensate the surviving family members in a 2004 court settlement.
Poljanak and Vukovići massacres	7 November 1991	Poljanak and Vukovići, near Slunj	10	Local Serb TO forces and a special JNA unit killed 10 Croat civilians in the villages of Poljanak and Vukovići, in the Plitvice lakes area.
Saborsko massacre	12 November 1991	Saborsko	29	Serb paramilitaries kill 29 Croats in the village of Saborsko.
Kostrići massacre	15 November 1991	Kostrići	16	Serb paramilitary unit killed 16 Croat civilians, including two children.
Majur massacres	15 November 1991	Majur, Graboštani and Stubalj	38	On the same day the Kostrići massacre occurred, the same Serb paramilitary unit massacred another 38 Croat civilians in the nearby villages of Majur, Graboštani and Stubalj.
Slunj massacres	16 November 1991 – 1995	Slunj and neighbouring areas, including Cetingrad and Rakovica	297	Serb forces killed Croat civilians in Slunj and surrounding areas throughout the occupation. The majority were killed between November 1991 and the Spring of 1992.
Škabrnja massacre	18 November 1991	Škabrnja and Nadin	67	Serb paramilitaries killed 48 Croat civilians and five Croatian POWs in the village of Škabrnja, and 14 civilians in the village of Nadin.
Borovo Naselje massacre	19 November 1991	Borovo Naselje, Vukovar	166	JNA and other Serb forces massacred 166 local civilians and POWs after the capture of Borovo Naselje.
Vukovar massacre	20 November 1991	Vukovar	264	A mostly Croatian group of 263 men and 1 woman (including civilians and POWs), of whom 194 have been identified, were murdered by members of the Serb militias following the JNA withdrawal from Ovčara after it brought those patients there from the Vukovar hospital.
Novska killings	21 November 1991 & 18 December 1991	Novska	7	Two separate instances of mass murder of ethnic Serbs in the town of Novska.
Dabar massacre	21 November 1991	Dabar, near Vrhovine	7	SAO Krajina paramilitaries tortured and killed 7 Croat civilians.
Laslovo massacre	23 November 1991	Laslovo	6	6 elderly Croat and Hungarian civilians massacred by Arkan's Tigers.
Divoš massacre	early December 1991	Divoš	24	Serb civilians massacred by Croatian forces.
Paulin Dvor massacre	11 December 1991	Paulin Dvor, near Osijek	19	Croatian Army (HV) soldiers massacred 18 Serbs and 1 Hungarian in the village of Paulin Dvor.
Gornje Jame massacre	11 December 1991	Gornje Jame	16	16 civilians (15 Croats and 1 Serb) killed by Šiltovi Serbian paramilitary unit.
Voćin massacre	13 December 1991	Voćin	43	43 Croat civilians massacred by White Eagles paramilitaries during Operation Papuk-91.
Bokane massacre	13 December 1991	Bokane, Krašković, Miokovićevo and Zvečevo	20	On the same day of the Voćin massacre, the same White Eagles paramilitaries killed another 20 Croat civilians during their retreat through neighbouring villages south of Voćin.
Voćin killings	13–16 December 1991	Voćin	24–40	After the withdrawal of Serb forces from Voćin and arrival of the Croatian Army, dozens of Serbs are killed over several days.
Joševica massacre	16 December 1991	Joševica	21	Serb paramilitaries killed 21 Croatian civilians killed reportedly in retaliation for Serb losses sustained in Operation Whirlwind.
Lađevac killings	21 December 1991 – June 1993	Donji Lađevac and Gornji Lađevac	20	Series of abuses and killings of Croat civilians, who remained in the Donji and Gornji Lađevac villages, by SAO Krajina paramilitaries.
Bruška massacre	21 December 1991	Bruška	10	10 Croatian civilians killed by Republic of Serbian Krajina forces.
Erdut killings	10 November 1991 – 3 June 1992	Erdut	37	A series of killings of 37 Croat and Hungarian civilians by local SAO forces and Serb Volunteer Guard paramilitaries.
Sotin massacre	26 December 1991	Sotin	64	32 Croat civilians massacred by Croatian Serb militia and Territorial Defense. A further thirty-two civilians are declared missing and are presumed to have been killed by Serb forces later into the occupation.
Šašići massacre	18 January 1992	Šašići, near Ervenik	4	Murder of 4 Croat members of the Čengić family by Serb paramilitaries.
Banski Kovačevac massacre	20 March 1992	Banski Kovačevac, near Karlovac	15	Croat civilians killed by Serb paramilitaries.
Slavonski Brod attack	3 May 1992	Slavonski Brod	16 killed, 60 wounded	Indiscriminate air attack by the Army of Republika Srpska across areas of Slavonski Brod killed 16 Croat civilians (including 6 children) and wounded 60 others.
Grabovac massacre	4 May 1992	Grabovac	5	Serbia's Red Berets special forces abducted and killed three men and two women. They were initially buried in Tikveš, before the bodies were moved to conceal the killings.
Slavonski Brod refugee camp shelling	15 July 1992	Slavonski Brod	12 killed, 31 wounded	12 Bosniak refugees killed and 31 wounded after their accommodation at a stadium in Slavonski Brod was shelled by the Army of the Republika Srpska.
Puljane massacre	2 February 1993	Puljane, near Promina	8	Eight elderly Croat civilians killed by Serb forces, allegedly in retaliation for the HV offensive Operation Maslenica.
Medviđa massacre	9 February 1993	Medviđa, near Benkovac	18	Eighteen Croat civilians killed by Serb forces, allegedly in retaliation for the HV offensive Operation Maslenica.
Soline rocket attack	14 June 1993	Biograd na Moru	5 killed, 7 wounded	Republic of Serbian Krajina forces fired M-87 Orkan cluster rockets at the Soline beach in Biograd na Moru, killing 5 and wounding 7 civilians.
Operation Medak Pocket	9–17 September 1993	near Gospić	36 (ICTY estimate)	Serb civilians and POWs killed by Croat forces during and after Operation Medak Pocket.
Karlovac attack	10 September 1993	Karlovac	11 killed, 23 wounded	Republic of Serbian Krajina forces shelled Karlovac, in retaliation for the Croatian Army launching the start of Operation Medak Pocket, killing 11 and wounding 23 civilians.
Batinjska Rijeka massacre	11 May 1994	Batinjska Rijeka, near Daruvar	5	Five Croat civilians abducted and killed by Serb forces.
Medari massacre	1 May 1995	Medari, near Okučani	22	HV forces killed 22 Serb civilians during Operation Flash.
Zagreb rocket attacks	2–3 May 1995	Zagreb	7 killed, 214 wounded	Republic of Serbian Krajina forces used multiple rocket launchers, fitted with cluster munitions, to strike civilian-populated areas of Zagreb on the 2 and 3 May 1995, in retaliation for the HV offensive Operation Flash. Part of the ICTY conviction of Milan Martić and Momčilo Perišić
Zaton attack	3 August 1995	Zaton, near Dubrovnik	3 killed, 3 wounded	On the eve of Operation Storm, Army of Republika Srpska forces shelled a public bathing area in the village of Zaton, near Dubrovnik, killing 3 and wounding another 3 Croat civilians.
Gospić attack	4 August 1995	Gospić	3	In retaliation for the Croatian Army launching the start of Operation Storm, Republic of Serbian Krajina forces of the 105th Aviation Brigade launched an air attack on Gospić, killing 3 civilians and wounding several others.
Golubić massacre	August 1995	Golubić	18	18 Serb civilians killed by Croat forces during and after Operation Storm.
Donji Lapac killings	August 1995	Donji Lapac	20	20 Serb civilians massacred by Croat forces after Operation Storm. Part of the ICTY indictment of Ante Gotovina and Mladen Markač.
Biskupija massacre	August 1995	Biskupija, near Knin	15	15 Serb civilians massacred by Croat forces in the aftermath of Operation Storm.
Kijani killings	August–September 1995	Kijani, Croatia	14	14 elderly Serb civilians executed by Croat forces in the aftermath of Operation Storm.
Sarena Jezera killings	5 August 1995	Sarena Jezera, near Knin	6	6 Serb civilians executed by Croat forces during Operation Storm.
Mokro Polje killings	6 August 1995	Mokro Polje, near Knin	5	At least 5 Serb civilians executed by Croat forces during Operation Storm.
Uzdolje massacre	6 August 1995	Uzdolje, near Knin	10	10 Serb civilians massacred by Croat forces during Operation Storm.
Glina refugee column massacre	7–8 August 1995	Main road between Glina and Dvor	16	Serb civilians in a refugee column killed after being ambushed by HV and ARBiH (5th Corps) forces during Operation Storm.
Dvor massacre	8 August 1995	Dvor	9	8 Croatian Serbs and 1 Croat civilian massacred in the aftermath of Operation Storm. At the time of the massacre, both Croatian and Serbian forces were in the vicinity of Dvor, but neither side has admitted to the killings. According to Jorgen Kold, his UN peacekeeping unit observed at least three Croatian soldiers with baseball caps and backpacks, near the camp on the morning of the massacre and "either they're covering it up, or someone doesn't want to remember". Kold defended his unit's failure to act by saying that they were instructed not to leave the camp or interfere.
Komić killings	12 August 1995	Komić, Croatia	9	9 elderly Serb civilians massacred by Croat forces in the aftermath of Operation Storm.
Grubori massacre	25 August 1995	Grubori, near Knin	6	6 Serb civilians massacred by the Lučko Anti-Terrorist Unit in the aftermath of Operation Storm.
Kistanje massacre	10–27 August 1995	Kistanje, near Knin	13	13 elderly Serb civilians massacred by Croat forces in the aftermath of Operation Storm, throughout August 1995.
Gošić massacre	27 August 1995	Gošić, Šibenik-Knin County	8	8 elderly Serb civilians massacred by Croat forces in the aftermath of Operation Storm.
Varivode massacre	28 September 1995	Varivode	9	9 elderly Serb civilians massacred by Croat forces in the village of Varivode.

== See also ==
- List of massacres in Yugoslavia
- List of massacres in Bosnia and Herzegovina
- List of massacres in Serbia
- List of massacres in Slovenia
- List of massacres in the Independent State of Croatia, massacres that occurred on the territory of the Independent State of Croatia between 1941 and 1945
