= Tisovac =

Tisovac may refer to:

- Tisovac, Tuzla, a village near Tuzla, Bosnia and Herzegovina
- Tisovac, Doboj, a village near Doboj, Bosnia and Herzegovina
- Tisovac, Brod-Posavina County, a village near Staro Petrovo Selo, Croatia
- Tisovac, Požega-Slavonia County, a village near Pakrac, Croatia
- Tisovac Žumberački, a village near Samobor, Zagreb County, Croatia
- Tisovac (mountain), a mountain in Bosnia and Herzegovina
