= Croatian War of Independence in film =

The Croatian War of Independence has been the subject of several feature films and documentaries. Those include:

- Dezerter (The Deserter), a 1992 Serbian film that covers the Battle of Vukovar
- Kaži zašto me ostavi (Why Have You Left Me), a 1993 Serbian film that covers the Battle of Vukovar
- Vukovar, jedna priča (Vukovar: A Story), a 1994 Serbian film
- Vukovar: The Way Home, a 1994 Croatian film
- The Death of Yugoslavia, a 1995 BBC documentary that covers the collapse of the former Yugoslavia
- How the War Started on My Island, a 1996 black comedy by Vinko Brešan
- The ER TV series character Dr. Luka Kovač, played by Goran Višnjić, first appeared on the series in 1999. The character lost his wife and children in the war when an artillery shell hit their house
- The Game Bag, a 1997 Italian film
- Madonna (Croatian: Bogorodica), a 1999 Croatian film
- Harrison's Flowers, a 2000 movie by Élie Chouraqui about a war reporter in 1991
- Oluja nad Krajinom (Storm over Krajina), a 2001 Croatian documentary that covers Operation Storm
- Witnesses, a 2003 Croatian drama
- Glave dole ruke na leđa (Heads Down Hands on Your Back), a 2003 B92 documentary that deals with the prison camps in Serbia
- Hrvatska ljubavi moja (Croatia My Love), a 2006 documentary by Jakov Sedlar that covers the relationship between postwar Croatia and the ICTY
- The Unit, a 2006 B92 documentary about "Red Berets", a Serb paramilitary unit
- Vukovar – Final Cut, a 2006 B92 documentary about the Battle of Vukovar, won the Human Rights Award at the 2006 Sarajevo Film Festival
- War for Peace, a 2007 Montenegrin documentary about the siege of Dubrovnik
- Zapamtite Vukovar (Remember Vukovar), a 2008 Croatian film directed by Fadil Hadžić, shown at the 2008 Pula Film Festival
- Zaustavljeni glas (The Stopped Voice), a 2010 Croatian documentary that covers the Battle of Vukovar and the death of Siniša Glavašević
- Korak po korak (Step by Step), a 2011 Croatian movie shown at the 58th Pula Film Festival
- Rat za Dubrovnik (War for Dubrovnik), a 2011 Montenegrin documentary on the siege of Dubrovnik
- Osijek – nepokoreni grad (Osijek – The Undefeated City), a 2012 Croatian documentary covering wartime events in Osijek in the period of 27 June 1991–15 January 1992
- Rosinjača, a 2011 Croatian documentary covering a battle fought in the Rosinjača Forest near Osijek on 5 December 1991
- Šlep za rasute terete (Bulk Cargo Barge), a 2012 Croatian documentary on the evacuation of civilians from Dalj, Erdut, and Aljmaš following the 1 August 1991 Dalj massacre
- Number 55, a 2014 feature on the ambush of a Croatian patrol in the village of Kusonje in September 1991
- Godina Oluje (The Year of the Storm), a 2015 HRT four-part documentary series covering diplomatic, political, and military aspects of the late stages of the war in Croatia and Bosnia and Herzegovina
- Deblokada Dubrovnika (Lifting the Siege of Dubrovnik), a 2017 two-part HRT documentary film covering the Croatian Army's efforts in Operation Tiger in 1992
- Maslenica, a 2018 two-part HRT documentary covering Operation Maslenica
- The General, a 2019 biography/war drama by Antun Vrdoljak about the life of general Ante Gotovina. In 2019, The General was the most expensive Croatian movie ever made
- Nestali, a 2019 HRT four-part miniseries following a group of Croatian soldiers stranded behind enemy lines ten days before Operation Storm
- Šesti autobus (The Sixth Bus), a 2022 Croatian film about a young American journalist who interviews veterans of the Battle of Vukovar in search of her father, who went missing during the battle

== Sources ==
- Daković, Nevena (2010). "Remembrances of the Past and the Present". In Cornis-Pope, Marcel; Neubauer, John (eds.). History of the Literary Cultures of East-Central Europe. Amsterdam: John Benjamins Publishing Company. ISBN 978-90-272-3458-2.
- Goulding, Daniel (2002). Liberated Cinema: The Yugoslav Experience, 1945–2001. Bloomington, Indiana: Indiana University Press. ISBN 978-0-253-21582-6.
- Iordanova, Dina (2001). Cinema of Flames: Balkan Film, Culture and the Media. London: British Film Institute. ISBN 978-0-85170-848-5.
- Sloan, Joan (2007). Reel Women: An International Directory of Contemporary Feature Films About Women. Lanham, Maryland: Scarecrow Press. ISBN 978-0-8108-5738-4.
- ""Vukovar – poslednji rez" osvojio nagradu u Sarajevu" ["Vukovar – Final Cut" wins award in Sarajevo] (in Serbian). Belgrade, Serbia: B92. 27 August 2006.
