= Begovac =

- Village
- Location of Begovac in Croatia
- Coordinates: 45°00′54″N 15°25′01″E
- Country: Croatia
- Region: Continental Croatia
- County: Karlovac County
- Municipality: Saborsko

Area
  - Total: 15.8 km^{2} (6.1 sq mi)
- Elevation: 537 m (1,762 ft)

Population (2021)
  - Total: 34
  - Density: 2.2/km^{2} (5.6/sq mi)
- Time zone: UTC+1 (CET)
  - Summer (DST): UTC+2 (CEST)
- Postal code: 47306 Saborsko
- Area code: (+385) 47

Begovac (known as Begovac Plaščanski until 1991) is a village in the Lika region of Croatia, in the municipality of Saborsko, Karlovac County.

== History ==
On 10 April 1941, while the Royal Yugoslav Army was withdrawing south by a passenger train, while stopped at Blato the Regia Aeronautica bombed the train, resulting in many dead and wounded. The villagers helped transport the wounded to the hospital in Ogulin: major Tihomir Oklobdžija, farmer Pavao Kostelac and the conductor Matija Pintar.

On 4 July 1942, Partisans destroyed 450 metres (1,480 ft) of track between Blato and Lička Jesenica. Italian soldiers arrived from Plaški on an armoured train and the Partisans retreated.

On 1–7 and 8 September, Partisans destroyed about 8 kilometres (5.0 mi) of railway between the Blato-Lička Jesenica and Javornik (Note: Opposite Saborsko.) stations. They burned 4 railway guardposts between Blato and Lička Jesenica and destroyed the water pump in Lička Jesenica. Italian railway guard troops engaged the Partisans in a 2 day battle. The Partisans killed 1 and wounded 8. After the Partisans left, it was estimated the repairs would take several days.

== Demographics ==
According to the 2011 census, the village of Begovac has 16 inhabitants. This represents 9.20% of its pre-war population according to the 1991 census.

The 1991 census recorded that 99.43% of the village population were ethnic Serbs (173/174) and 0.57% were of other ethnic origin (1/174).

Historical population 1857-2011
v

population	167	254	259	300	296	238	234	310	296	281	256	218	185	174	25	16
	1857	1869	1880	1890	1900	1910	1921	1931	1948	1953	1961	1971	1981	1991	2001	2011

Sources: Croatian Bureau of Statistics publications

NOTE: Known as Begovac Plaščanski until 1991 census, and Begovac from 2001 census on

== Sights ==
- Blaćansko lake
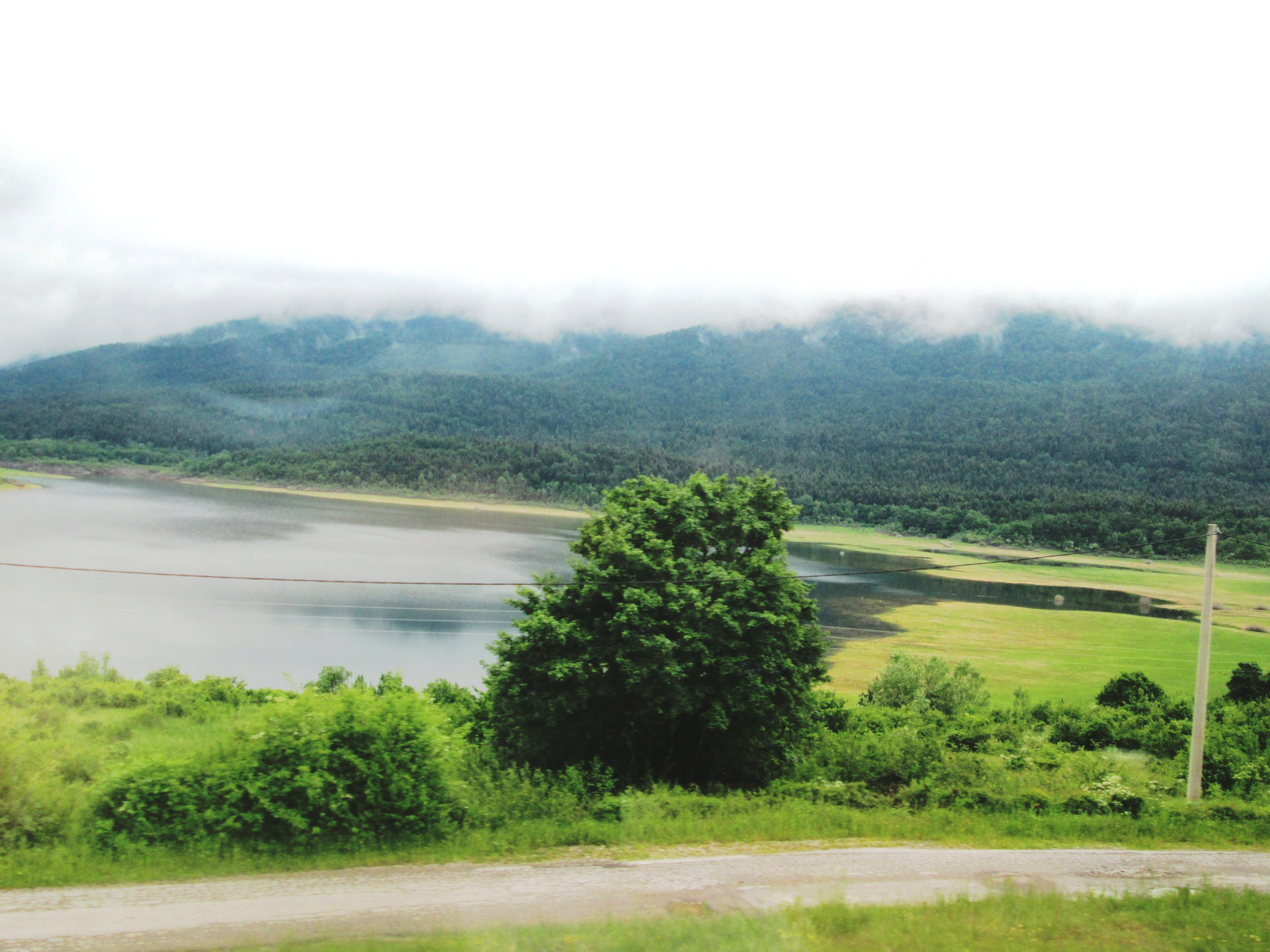
  Blaćansko lake

== See also ==
- Saborsko massacre

== Bibliography ==
- Trgo, Fabijan, ed. (1964). Zbornik dokumenata i podataka o Narodno-oslobodilačkom ratu Jugoslovenskih naroda. Vol. V, 32.
