= Blata =

Blata may refer to:

- Blata, Croatia, a village in Croatia
- Blata (river), a river in the Czech Republic
- Blata, a village and part of Nýrsko in the Czech Republic
- Blata, a village and part of Zámostí-Blata in the Czech Republic
