= Bučje camp =

Concentration camp

- Concentration camp
- Location within Croatia
- Coordinates: 45°27′44″N 17°24′09″E
- Location: Bučje, Pakrac, Croatia
- Operated by: Croatian Serb rebels
- Operational: August–December 1991
- Inmates: Croatian civilians, prisoners of war, pro-government Serbs
- Number of inmates: 200–300
- Killed: 10
- Notable inmates: Ivan Šreter

The Bučje camp (Croatian: Logor Bučje) was a concentration camp ran by rebel Croatian Serb forces during the early stages of the Croatian War of Independence. Located in the village of Bučje near Pakrac, the camp was used for the imprisonment of 200–300 Croatian civilians, prisoners of war, other non-Serbs, as well as Serbs that sided with the Croatian government or refused to join Serbian paramilitary groups. The camp was the site of numerous war crimes including murder, rape, and torture. Twenty-two detainees are still listed as missing as of December 2013.

On two separate occasions, in August and again in October 1991, some inmates were released as part of an organized prisoner exchange with Croatian forces. The remaining 70 prisoners were taken to the Stara Gradiška camp while Bučje itself was closed on 13 December 1991. A few days later, on 26 December, the empty camp and the surrounding area were captured by Croatian forces.

== Background ==
In 1990, following the electoral defeat of the government of the Socialist Republic of Croatia by the pro-independence Croatian Democratic Union (HDZ), relations between ethnic Croats and ethnic Serbs deteriorated. In 1991, the municipality of Pakrac, in which the village of Bučje was located, was the only municipality in the central part of the Western Slavonia area with a Serbian majority, with Serbs representing 46.4% of its population, followed by Croats with 35.8%. In early 1991, the Pakrac local assembly voted on joining SAO Krajina although the Constitutional Court of Croatia declared the decision invalid. Ethnic tensions in the region culminated on 1 March 1991 with the Pakrac clash, one of the first serious outbreaks of violence in the Croatian War of Independence.

== Operation ==
The first prisoners were taken to villages Grđevica and Branešci. Soon afterward, they were transferred to Bučje where local Serb paramilitary groups with the help of the Yugoslav People's Army (JNA) established a prison camp in the buildings of the nearby veterinary station, school, forest service, and the old municipality seat on 16 August 1991. Prisoners, numbering 200 to 300 during the time the camp was active, consisted of Croatian civilians, some of whom were taken from their workplaces and vineyards, captured members of the Ministry of the Interior and the Croatian National Guard (ZNG), other non-Serb minorities as well as Serbs that were loyal to the Croatian government or refused to join the paramilitary groups.

Women and children were among those detained in the camp, the youngest inmate being four years old. Prisoners were subjected to physical and psychological abuse. They were beaten while handcuffed and blindfolded and forced to do hard physical labor that resulted in a number of deaths. Eyewitness accounts also confirmed that 10 prisoners were murdered. However, as of 2013, only one body has been recovered. The fate and location of the remains of 22 others is still unknown. Two women were raped while being videotaped. Among the prisoners whose remains have yet to be found was Dr. Ivan Šreter, director of the Pakrac hospital and the president of the local HDZ.

The camp was closed on 13 December after prisoner exchanges in August and October 1991. The remaining 70 prisoners were taken to a camp in Stara Gradiška, where they were exchanged in January 1992. By that time, the Croatian Army (HV) captured the empty camp in Bučje as a part of its Operation Papuk-91 in late 1991.

== Aftermath ==
On 27 January 1993, the county court in Požega filed an indictment against four Serbian paramilitaries, accusing them of taking a civilian to Bučje and torturing him, along with others in the camp. In April, the four were convicted in absentia. All were sentenced to 8 years imprisonment. In 2009 the county state attorney officially requested that the men be re-tried. In the changed indictment, new evidence suggested that the four did indeed take an individual to Bučje, but they did not participate in the torture of prisoners and had no influence on how long they would be imprisoned. Also, the person they forced to Bučje was captured in his workplace but was a member of the Ministry of the Interior reserve force. They were subsequently charged with armed mutiny against Croatia and were acquitted as part of a general amnesty.

In July 1999, the state attorney filed an indictment against R. A. for physically and psychologically abusing prisoners while serving as a guard in the camp. He was sentenced to six years imprisonment later that year. On 27 January 2007 the county court in Požega sentenced V. K., a guard in the camp, to 20 years in prison for abusing inmates at Bučje. On 2008 members of the veterans associations from Pakrac and Lipik collected information about the case and filed a report to the state attorney, naming 11 individuals whom they believed to be responsible for the opening of the camp.
