= Gornji Grahovljani =

- Village
- Location within Croatia
- Coordinates: 45.4826°N 17.3171°E
- Country: Croatia
- County: Požega-Slavonia
- Municipality: Pakrac

Area
  - Total: 12.9 km^{2} (5.0 sq mi)

Population (2021)
  - Total: 9
  - Density: 0.70/km^{2} (1.8/sq mi)
- Time zone: UTC+1 (CET)
  - Summer (DST): UTC+2 (CEST)

Gornji Grahovljani is a village in Pakrac, Croatia. It is located on the northeast of Pakrac, south of the Papuk mountain in western Slavonia. It is administratively part of the city of Pakrac and its population is 8 (census 2011).

== History ==
In the past villages Gornji Grahovljani, Donji Grahovljani and Srednji Grahovljani they were just one village named Grahovljani.

Between late 1991 and 1995 the village came under the control of the Republic of Serbian Krajina during the Croatian War of Independence.
