= Night Guard =

Night Guard or night guard may refer to:

- Night Guard, a television series on the Fox Crime network
- "Night Guard", a song on Stan Rogers' 1981 album Northwest Passage
- Model 325 Night Guard, a discontinued handgun; see Smith & Wesson Model 625
- Night Guard, code name for a 1991 Croatian military operation; see Banija villages killings
- A mouthguard worn at night
