= Kostrići massacre =

Massacre in Kostrići, Croatia

- Part of the Croatian War of Independence
- Kostrići on the map of Croatia. Territories controlled by Serb or JNA forces in late December 1991 are highlighted in red.
- Location: 45.14°N 16.533°E; Kostrići, Croatia
- Date: 15 November 1991
- Target: Croat civilians
- Attack type: Summary executions, ethnic cleansing
- Deaths: 16
- Perpetrator: Kaline Komogovina paramilitary unit

The Kostrići massacre (Croatian: pokolj u Kostrićima) was the killing 16 Croat civilians (the entire population of the village) in the village of Kostrići, near Hrvatska Kostajnica by Serb paramilitary unit "Kaline Komogovina" on 15 November 1991 during the Croatian War of Independence. Among those killed were two children. The oldest victim was 93 years old.

The Serb paramilitary unit of "Kaline Komogovina", which was led by Stevo Borojević "Gadafi", entered Kostrići from two directions, from Hrvatska Kostajnica and Majur and murdered the entire population remaining in the village, which amounted to 16 civilians. In one house they found a young woman with two children (aged two and four), whom they asked for her husband, Zlatko Jurić. After being told that he had gone to the neighbouring village Stubalj, the three were killed. The husband reported the crime to Milan Martić's militia (the police force of SAO Krajina) in Kostajnica, and was then killed. The village was looted and burned. Only seven victims were identified. Some victims were found after the war in burned and destroyed homes.

After committing the massacre in Kostrići, the same Serb paramilitary unit massacred another 38 Croat civilians in the nearby villages of Majur, Graboštani and Stubalj.

Two alleged members of the paramilitary unit have been charged with killing five police officers and two civilians in the village Volinja in October 1991.

In 2011 a monument to the victims, with names inscribed, was unveiled in the village.

== See also ==
- List of massacres in the Croatian War

== Sources ==
- "Dva krajinska milicajca iz Dvora kazneno prijavljena zbog ratnog zločina, 7. studenoga 2011". Slobodna Dalmacija. 2011-11-07.
- Justice Report (2013). "Clarification of the Large Number of Crimes". justice-report.com.
- "Record on examination of the defendant". 1992.
