= Glavica, Požega-Slavonia County =

Coordinates: 45°27′23″N 17°25′15″E

Glavica
- Village
- Interactive map of Glavica
- Country: Croatia
- County: Požega-Slavonia
- Town: Pakrac

Area
  - Total: 1.8 km^{2} (0.69 sq mi)

Population (2021)
  - Total: 13
  - Density: 7.2/km^{2} (19/sq mi)
- Time zone: UTC+1 (CET)
  - Summer (DST): UTC+2 (CEST)

Glavica is a village in Croatia. It is connected by the D38 highway.
