= Gornja Obrijež =

- Village
- Location within Croatia
- Coordinates: 45.4818°N 17.1728°E
- Country: Croatia
- County: Požega-Slavonia
- Municipality: Pakrac

Area
  - Total: 2.2 sq mi (5.6 km^{2})

Population (2021)
  - Total: 84
  - Density: 39/sq mi (15/km^{2})
- Time zone: UTC+1 (CET)
  - Summer (DST): UTC+2 (CEST)

Gornja Obrijež is a village in Croatia.
