= Bruška massacre =

1991 massacre in Croatia

Coordinates: 44.0749°N 15.7381°E

Bruška on the map of Croatia, 1991/1992. Serbian-held territories are highlighted in red.

The Bruška massacre took place on 21 December 1991 in Bruška, a small village near the Croatian town of Benkovac when Serbian paramilitaries executed 10 civilians in the hamlet of Marinovići. Nine were members of the Marinović family and one was a Serb neighbor. They were led out of the house after playing cards and shot on the spot by members of a Serb paramilitary group called "Knindže". The paramilitary group was commanded by Dragan Vasiljković, who was indicted by the Croatian Ministry of Justice. Vasiljković was arrested in Australia in 2006 and extradited to Croatia in 2015.

== See also ==
- List of massacres in Croatia
