= Blata, Croatia =

Blata
- Village
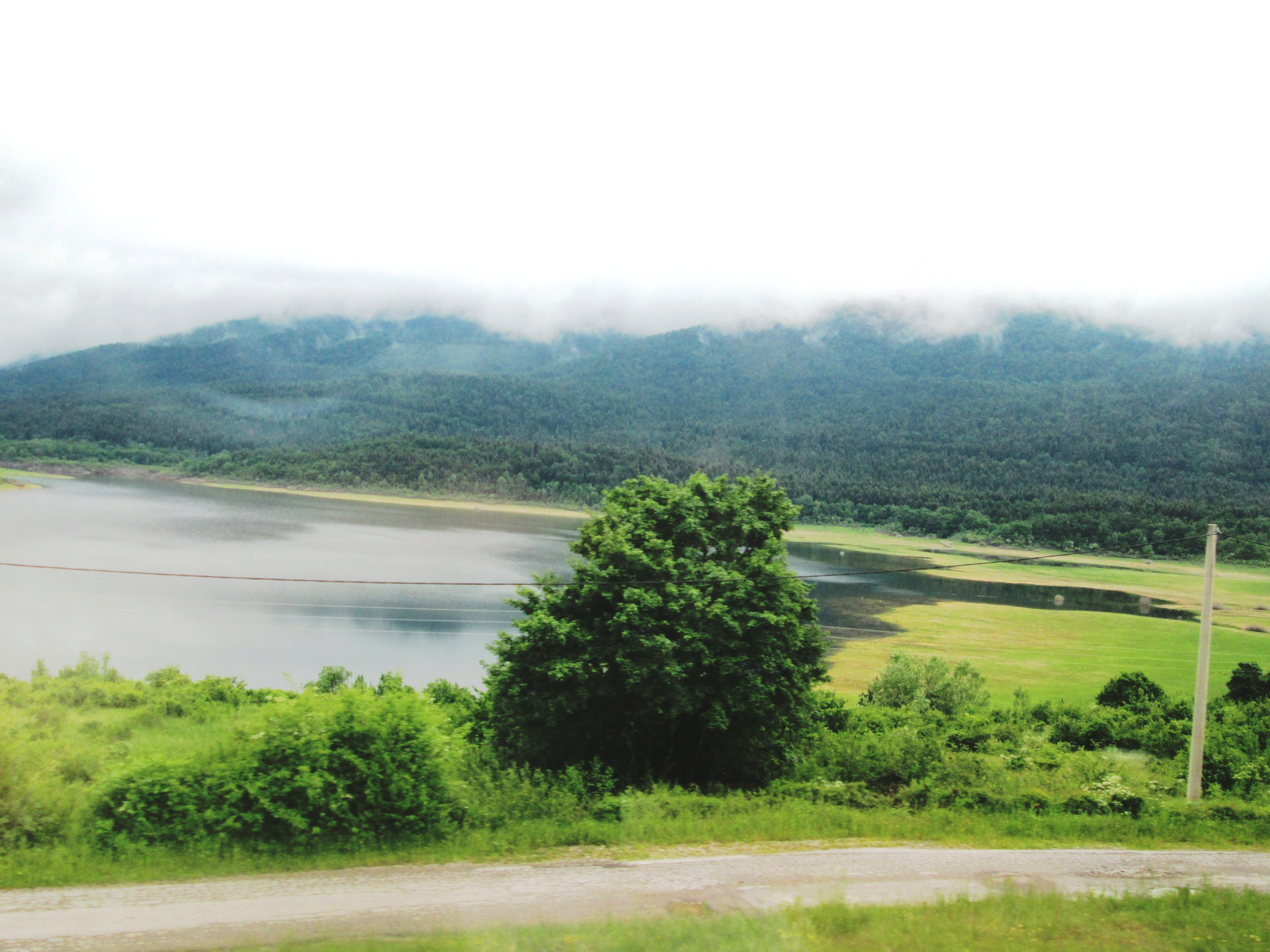
- Blaćansko lake

- Location of Blata in Croatia
- Coordinates: 45°01′55″N 15°23′01″E
- Country: Croatia
- Region: Continental Croatia
- County: Karlovac County
- Municipality: Saborsko

Area
  - Total: 12.2 km^{2} (4.7 sq mi)
- Elevation: 518 m (1,699 ft)

Population (2021)
  - Total: 28
  - Density: 2.3/km^{2} (5.9/sq mi)
- Time zone: UTC+1 (CET)
  - Summer (DST): UTC+2 (CEST)
- Postal code: 47306 Saborsko
- Area code: (+385) 47

Blata is a village in the Lika region of Croatia, in the municipality of Saborsko, Karlovac County.

== Demographics ==
According to the 2011 census, the village of Blata has 54 inhabitants. This represents 174.19% of its pre-war population according to the 1991 census.

The 1991 census recorded that 96.77% of the village population were ethnic Serbs (30/31) and 3.23% were of other ethnic origin (1/31).

Historical population 1857-2011
v

population	297	340	306	365	379	465	445	468	435	380	341	299	240	31	50	54
	1857	1869	1880	1890	1900	1910	1921	1931	1948	1953	1961	1971	1981	1991	2001	2011

Sources: Croatian Bureau of Statistics publications

== Sights ==
- Blaćansko lake

== See also ==
- Saborsko massacre
