= Gorice, Brod-Posavina County =

Gorice
- Village
- Location within Croatia
- Coordinates: 45.215°N 17.298°E
- Country: Croatia
- County: Brod-Posavina
- Municipality: Dragalić

Area
  - Total: 22.9 km^{2} (8.8 sq mi)

Population (2021)
  - Total: 126
  - Density: 5.50/km^{2} (14.3/sq mi)
- Time zone: UTC+1 (CET)
  - Summer (DST): UTC+2 (CEST)
- Postal code: 35429
- Area code: 035

Gorice is a village in municipality of Dragalić in Brod-Posavina County, Croatia.

== Climate ==
Since records began in 2004, the highest temperature recorded at the local weather station at an elevation of 135 metres (443 ft) was 39.4 °C (102.9 °F), on 8 August 2017. The coldest temperature was −20.4 °C (−4.7 °F), on 9 February 2012.

== Demographics ==
Village of Gorice: Population trends 1857–2021
v

population	173	186	226	276	305	373	356	392	440	400	366	324	249	220	166	175	126
	1857	1869	1880	1890	1900	1910	1921	1931	1948	1953	1961	1971	1981	1991	2001	2011	2021

Sources: Croatian Bureau of Statistics publications
