= Dragalić =

Croatian municipality

- Municipality
- Interactive map of Dragalić
- Location within Croatia
- Coordinates: 45°14′48″N 17°17′20″E
- Country: Croatia
- County: Brod-Posavina County

Government
  - Mayor: Zvonimir Karlik

Area
  - Municipality: 61.6 km^{2} (23.8 sq mi)
  - Urban: 6.1 km^{2} (2.4 sq mi)

Population (2021)
  - Municipality: 1,058
  - Density: 17.2/km^{2} (44.5/sq mi)
  - Urban: 454
  - Urban density: 74/km^{2} (190/sq mi)
- Time zone: UTC+1 (CET)
  - Summer (DST): UTC+2 (CEST)
- Postal code: 35430 Okučani
- Area code: 035
- Website: dragalic.hr

Dragalić is a village and a municipality in the Brod-Posavina County, Croatia. It is located around 7 km west of Nova Gradiška.

== Demographics ==
As of 2011, there were 1,361 inhabitants, in the following settlements:

- Donji Bogićevci, population 84
- Dragalić, population 559
- Gorice, population 175
- Mašić, population 266
- Medari, population 177
- Poljane, population 100

80% of the population declared themselves Croats, 17.85% Serbs.

Dragalić: Population trends 1857–2021
v

population	1301	1579	1618	2111	2416	2869	2828	3090	3127	3038	3135	3077	2781	2715	1282	1361	1058
	1857	1869	1880	1890	1900	1910	1921	1931	1948	1953	1961	1971	1981	1991	2001	2011	2021

Sources: Croatian Bureau of Statistics publications

== Politics ==
Dragalić is an underdeveloped municipality which is statistically classified as a First Category Area of Special State Concern by the Government of Croatia.

=== Minority councils ===
Directly elected minority councils and representatives are tasked with consulting tasks for the local or regional authorities in which they are advocating for minority rights and interests, integration into public life and participation in the management of local affairs. At the 2023 Croatian national minorities councils and representatives elections Serbs of Croatia fulfilled legal requirements to elect 10 members minority councils of the Municipality of Dragalić.
