= Donja Obrijež =

Coordinates: 45°29′N 17°08′E

- Village
- Interactive map of Donja Obrijež
- Country: Croatia
- County: Požega-Slavonia
- Town: Pakrac

Area
  - Total: 9.4 km^{2} (3.6 sq mi)

Population (2021)
  - Total: 176
  - Density: 19/km^{2} (48/sq mi)
- Time zone: UTC+1 (CET)
  - Summer (DST): UTC+2 (CEST)

Donja Obrijež is a village in Croatia.
