= Španovica =

- Location of Španovica in Croatia
- Coordinates: 45°28′N 17°18′E
- Country: Croatia
- County: Požega-Slavonia

Area
  - Total: 6.3 km^{2} (2.4 sq mi)

Population (2021)
  - Total: 14
  - Density: 2.2/km^{2} (5.8/sq mi)

Španovica, known as Novo Selo under the Socialist Federal Republic of Yugoslavia, is a village in Pakrac, Croatia. It is located on the Pakrac–Požega main road, south of the Papuk mountain in western Slavonia. It has a population of 23, according to the 2011 Croatian census.

== History ==
Španovica was established in the second half of the 19th century when Croats from Ravna Gora, in the mountainous region of Gorski Kotar, settled there. The surrounding villages were inhabited by ethnic Serbs.

The inhabitants of Španovica and their Serb neighbours coexisted peacefully until the outbreak of World War II, when the village became a stronghold of the fascist Ustaše movement, which began arresting Serbs from the surrounding area. In the summer of 1942, Ustaše official Vjekoslav Luburić oversaw the "cleansing" of the surrounding Serb villages, which resulted in the deaths of hundreds of Serb villagers and the deportation of many others to detention camps. Some residents of Španovica took part in these operations. That autumn, the Yugoslav Partisans captured Španovica from the Ustaše. Serb villagers whose relatives had previously been killed by the Ustaše subsequently burned most of the village to the ground, killing an undetermined number of Croat civilians and forcing the survivors to flee to the nearby town of Pakrac.

After World War II, Španovica was renamed Novo Selo and repopulated by Serbs from Bosnia. Its previous Croat inhabitants were prohibited from returning. During the Croatian War of Independence, Novo Selo was initially under the control of Croatian Serb rebels. It was captured by the Croatian Army in December 1991, and its Serb inhabitants fled. The village's earlier name was subsequently reinstated. By 2020, only around a dozen of Španovica's former inhabitants had returned to the village. That year, director Jadran Boban released a documentary film about Španovica and its history, titled Ono drugo selo (transl. That Other Village).
