= Battle of Kusonje =

Part of the Croatian War of Independence

Coordinates: 45.462408°N 17.236691°E

- Part of the Croatian War of Independence
Date	8–9 September 1991
Location	Kusonje, Croatia
Result	SAO Western Slavonia victory

Belligerents
Croatia	(Republic of Serbian Krajina) SAO Western Slavonia

Commanders and leaders
(Croatia) Stjepan Ivanić †	(Republic of Serbian Krajina) Nikola Uzelac

Units involved
Company "A" 1st Battalion of the 105th Brigade; Omega SPU	SAO Krajina Infantry Battalion

Casualties and losses
All 20 soldiers killed (including 7 executed after the battle)	unknown

The Battle of Kusonje was a two-day clash fought in the village of Kusonje near the town of Pakrac on 8–9 September 1991, during the Croatian War of Independence. The battle was initiated when a platoon of the Croatian National Guard (Croatian: Zbor narodne garde – ZNG) was ambushed by Croatian Serb forces while conducting a reconnaissance patrol. The ZNG deployed reinforcements to extract the ambushed platoon, but failed to reach them. The surviving members of the platoon held out until they ran out of ammunition and surrendered only to be killed by their captors and buried in a mass grave.

The fate of the reconnaissance platoon was not known to Croatian authorities for months, adding fuel to an already volatile atmosphere in the city of Bjelovar, where the ambushed unit was originally based. This tension erupted a week later with the blockade and capture of the Yugoslav People's Army (Serbian: Jugoslovenska Narodna Armija – JNA) barracks in Bjelovar.

During a commemoration service held two years later, a landmine exploded killing three and wounding others. The Croatian authorities declared the incident to be a terrorist attack, and it contributed to Croatian government's decision to launch Operation Medak Pocket the next day.

== Background ==
In 1990, ethnic tensions between Serbs and Croats worsened after the electoral defeat of the government of the Socialist Republic of Croatia by the Croatian Democratic Union (Croatian: Hrvatska demokratska zajednica – HDZ). The Yugoslav People's Army (Serbian: Jugoslovenska Narodna Armija – JNA) confiscated Croatia's Territorial Defence (Croatian: Teritorijalna obrana – TO) weapons to minimize resistance. On 17 August, the tensions escalated into an open revolt of the Croatian Serbs, centred on the predominantly Serb-populated areas of the Dalmatian hinterland around Knin (approximately 60 kilometres (37 miles) north-east of Split), parts of the Lika, Kordun, Banovina and eastern Croatia. In January 1991, Serbia, supported by Montenegro and Serbia's provinces of Vojvodina and Kosovo, unsuccessfully tried to obtain the Yugoslav Presidency's approval for a JNA operation to disarm Croatian security forces. The request was denied and a bloodless skirmish between Serb insurgents and Croatian special police in March prompted the JNA itself to ask the Federal Presidency to give it wartime authority and declare a state of emergency. Even though the request was backed by Serbia and its allies, the JNA request was refused on 15 March. Serbian President Slobodan Milošević, preferring a campaign to expand Serbia rather than to preserve Yugoslavia with Croatia as a federal unit, publicly threatened to replace the JNA with a Serbian army and declared that he no longer recognized the authority of the federal Presidency. The threat caused the JNA to abandon plans to preserve Yugoslavia in favour of expansion of Serbia as the JNA came under Milošević's control. By the end of March, the conflict had escalated with the first fatalities. In early April, leaders of the Serb revolt in Croatia declared their intention to amalgamate the areas under their control with Serbia. These were viewed by the Government of Croatia as breakaway regions.

At the beginning of 1991, Croatia had no regular army. To bolster its defence, Croatia doubled its police numbers to about 20,000. The most effective part of the Croatian police force was 3,000-strong special police comprising twelve battalions organised along military lines. There were also 9,000–10,000 regionally organised reserve police in 16 battalions and 10 companies, but they lacked weapons. In response to the deteriorating situation, the Croatian government established the Croatian National Guard (Croatian: Zbor narodne garde – ZNG) in May by expanding the special police battalions into four all-professional guards brigades. Under Ministry of Defence control and commanded by retired JNA General Martin Špegelj, the four guards brigades comprised approximately 8,000 troops. The reserve police, also expanded to 40,000, was attached to the ZNG and reorganised into 19 brigades and 14 independent battalions. The guards brigades were the only units of the ZNG that were fully equipped with small arms; throughout the ZNG there was a lack of heavier weapons and there was poor command and control structure above the brigade level. The shortage of heavy weapons was so severe that the ZNG resorted to using World War II weapons taken from museums and film studios. At the time, the Croatian weapon stockpile consisted of 30,000 small arms purchased abroad and 15,000 previously owned by the police. To replace the personnel lost to the guards brigades, a new 10,000-strong special police was established.

== Prelude ==
Map of western Slavonia (modern county lines provided for reference)

Following the first skirmish in Pakrac in March, a predominantly Serb-populated area east of the town, straddling the Pakrac–Bučje–Požega road, remained generally beyond the control of Croatian authorities. In early July, the insurrection spread to the entire area between the towns of Pakrac and Požega and north to the northern slopes of Papuk and Bilogora. This development threatened to interdict the Croatian use of the Varaždin–Osijek road, as it was within range of Croatian Serb artillery near Slatina. After the Serb rebels declared the Serbian Autonomous Oblast of Western Slavonia (SAO Western Slavonia) and expanded the territory under their control to include the town of Okučani, the most significant transport route between Zagreb and Slavonia—the Zagreb–Belgrade motorway between Novska and Nova Gradiška—was severed. SAO Western Slavonia comprised no major settlements. In order to address this deficiency, Croatian Serb forces launched an offensive early on 19 August. The objectives of the offensive were to capture the towns of Grubišno Polje, Daruvar, Pakrac and Lipik, and consolidate the territory of SAO Western Slavonia. The offensive failed after the arrival of Croatian reinforcements from Zagreb and Bjelovar, but the line of control remained in close proximity to the four towns.

== Timeline ==
On 2 September, the ZNG deployed A Company, 1st Battalion, 105th Infantry Brigade to Pakrac in order to reinforce police defences in the area. Violence in western Slavonia flared up once more on 3–4 September, when Croatian Serb forces attacked the villages of Četekovac, Čojlug and Balinci south of Slatina, killing two policemen and 21 civilians.

On 8 September, A Company's reconnaissance platoon was tasked with using a gun truck and scouting the area around the village of Kusonje. The platoon encountered no resistance before it reached the village, where it was ambushed by Croatian Serb troops. The platoon's gun truck was disabled and the ZNG troops abandoned it and took shelter in a nearby house.

When it learned of the ambush, the ZNG deployed a force to extract the reconnaissance platoon. The relief force consisted of the rest of A Company, supported by the "Omega" special police unit, reserve police, and ZNG reinforcements from Virovitica. The reinforcements were unable to reach the embattled reconnaissance platoon, which was running low on ammunition. The stalemate continued until the morning of 9 September, when Croatian Serb forces used explosives to demolish a portion of the house in which the reconnaissance platoon had sought cover. Eleven members of the reconnaissance platoon had been killed during the fighting, and the remaining seven had run out of ammunition. They surrendered to the Croatian Serb forces which had surrounded the house, and were then tortured and killed by their captors. The bodies of the victims showed signs of severe torture and mutilation, including evidence of castration and bodies that had their ears, noses and fingers cut off.

== Aftermath ==
As the force which was sent to reinforce and extract the reconnaissance platoon took further casualties, the total Croatian losses in the fighting and its immediate aftermath amounted to 20 killed. The fate of the reconnaissance platoon was not immediately known to Croatian authorities or relatives of the troops for months, adding fuel to an already volatile atmosphere in the city of Bjelovar, where the 105th Brigade was originally based. This tension erupted a week later, with the blockade and capture of the JNA barracks in Bjelovar. The JNA denied it had any knowledge on the fate of the Croatian soldiers. Details of their deaths became known in December 1991. Croatian forces recaptured Kusonje on 30 December in Operation Papuk-91, and their bodies were exhumed in January 1992. Along with the soldiers, the bodies of 23 civilians were also exhumed from a mass grave in the village of Rakov Potok. The soldiers were re-interred in Bjelovar on 5 February 1992. According to JNA intelligence reports, during the period from the exhumation to the re-interment, 32 Serb-owned houses in Bjelovar were demolished in retribution for the killings.

The area was demilitarised following the arrival of the United Nations Protection Force (UNPROFOR) to implement the Vance plan and ceasefire to stabilise the areas affected by the fighting until a political settlement was reached. The area adjacent to the Pakrac–Požega road, especially around Kusonje, remained unsafe. There were numerous attacks along the road, resulting in deaths and injuries. These included an attack on a Croatian police patrol on 5 August 1993, which left four policemen dead and another four wounded. In September 1993, Croatian authorities placed a commemorative plaque at the site of the 1991 ambush and planned a wreath laying ceremony to mark the second anniversary of the event. At 10:20 on 8 September, while the ceremony was in progress, a landmine exploded at the site killing three and injuring eleven. The wounded included one Argentinian member of UNPROFOR. Those killed were members of the ZNG 105th Brigade. The incident, described by the Croatian authorities as an act of terrorism, came on the heels of a series of artillery bombardments and sabotages that resulted in the Croatian government losing its patience with the situation. This contributed to the launching of Operation Medak Pocket the following day.

Croatian authorities prosecuted four people in connection with the 1991 killing of the prisoners of war, and convicted and sentenced them to 15 to 20 years in prison. Another person was tried and convicted in connection with the 1993 bombing, and sentenced to 20 years in prison. In 1998, the Chapel of Nativity of Mary was built in Kusonje at the initiative of the parents of the soldiers who were killed there, and a commemorative plaque containing the names of the 23 killed was placed at the chapel. The events of 1991 and 1993 are commemorated annually in Kusonje, with civilian and military representatives attending. In 2014, a feature film titled Number 55, based on the 1991 events in Kusonje, was released. The title of the film refers to the number of the house where the ZNG troops took shelter on 8–9 September 1991.
