= Poljane, Brod-Posavina County =

Poljane
- Village
- Location within Croatia
- Coordinates: 45.239°N 17.308°E
- Country: Croatia
- County: Brod-Posavina
- Municipality: Dragalić

Area
  - Total: 5.6 km^{2} (2.2 sq mi)

Population (2021)
  - Total: 65
  - Density: 12/km^{2} (30/sq mi)
- Time zone: UTC+1 (CET)
  - Summer (DST): UTC+2 (CEST)
- Postal code: 35400 Nova Gradiška
- Area code: 035

Poljane is a village in municipality of Dragalić in Brod-Posavina County, Croatia.

== History ==
There were often tensions between the residents of the village and the HV during the War in Krajina. In the summer of 1991, many had received arms. In July, an HV column arrived from Gradiška to disarm the village, announcing a disarmament over a megaphone and banging on doors. After a sting operation and some mistreatment, they left that day. They came back on the evening September 4th, again banging on doors, but after the residents had gone to sleep this time they raided the village, firing their weapons in threat. The elderly commanded the young to flee, while the elderly themselves slept on the fields and in the barns, returning in the morning. When they returned, they were met by soldiers demanding them to hand over their weapons and "Chetniks". They then herded the villagers through the village with whips, questioning some at gunpoint while others continued to break down doors. A total of 150 villagers were captured, the men separated from the women, the women placed in a house and the men in a basement, each under guard. They slept on straw throughout the winter, without heating. The women would cook for both the captives and the soldiers. One of the guards, Džebo, would line the women up and shoot over their heads, but a certain Vjekoslav was regarded as the worst.

Whenever fighting would break out, they led them to a different house where they had to sleep standing. But at some point, the soldiers had the men go out at 5:00 in the morning and dig trenches on the front line between SVK-held Dragalić. One time their guard was shot by the SVK, and the captives tried to save him in their coat, but the shots had disemboweled him and he died. 11 of the captives were wounded during the fighting while digging trenches; on one occasion 5 at once. Around New Year, one of the captives, Milutin Lakić, disappeared. The captives suspected he was killed, like Nikola Stojčević, who went to check on his house while he could still walk but was gunned down in front of it by an HV soldier. The survivors spent almost 7 months in captivity before UNPROFOR exchanged them for POWs of the RSK in early March 1992. Although some houses had been burned during the captivity, most were set alight after the exchange.

== Demographics ==
Naselje Poljane: Population trends 1857–2021
v

population	236	285	265	325	339	416	414	478	452	420	423	430	420	412	54	100	65
	1857	1869	1880	1890	1900	1910	1921	1931	1948	1953	1961	1971	1981	1991	2001	2011	2021

Sources: Croatian Bureau of Statistics publications
