= Saša Krajnović =

Serbian footballer

Personal information
- Full name: Saša Krajnović
- Date of birth: 15 August 1989 (age 37)
- Place of birth: Pakrac, SFR Yugoslavia
- Height: 1.86 m (6 ft 1 in)
- Position: Defender

Team information
- Current team: Sinđelić Beograd

Senior career*
Years	Team	Apps	(Gls)
2007–2008	Lokomotiva Beograd	8	(1)
2008–2009	Lisović	12	(0)
2009	→ BASK (loan)	9	(0)
2009	Zemun	0	(0)
2010–2011	Čukarički	6	(0)
2011	Shahrdari Tabriz	0	(0)
2012	Borac Banja Luka	2	(0)
2013	Banat Zrenjanin	15	(3)
2013–2014	Olympic Azzaweya		
2015	Sinđelić Beograd	4	(0)
- * Club domestic league appearances and goals as of 11 December 2015

Saša Krajnović (Serbian Cyrillic: Саша Крајновић; born 15 August 1989) is a Serbian footballer.

== Career ==
Born in Pakrac (SR Croatia, SFR Yugoslavia) still young he moved to Belgrade where he begin his football career by playing with lower league sides such as FK Lokomotiva Beograd, FK Lisović and FK BASK all playing in the Serbian League Belgrade, national third tier. In summer 2009 he moved to FK Zemun, however shortly after he would sign with another Belgrade club, FK Čukarički, this one being member of the Serbian SuperLiga. He gathered 6 league appearances during the 2010–11 season, however as the club finished bottom of the table it meant it would be relegated, thus Krajnović opted to accept the offer from Iranian side Shahrdari Tabriz F.C. in summer 2011. However during the following winter, he would return to Europe and join FK Borac Banja Luka playing in the Bosnian Premier League.
