= Ivanovo Selo massacre =

1991 mass murder of Czech civilians

- Part of the Croatian War of Independence
- Ivanovo Selo on the map of Croatia, JNA/SAO Krajina-held areas in late 1991 are highlighted in red
- Location: 45.673440°N 17.253310°E; Ivanovo Selo, Croatia
- Date: 21 September 1991
- Target: Croatian Czech civilians
- Attack type: Mass murder
- Deaths: 7
- Perpetrator: Serb rebels

The Ivanovo Selo massacre was the mass murder of ethnic Czech civilians by Serb rebels on 21 September 1991, in the village of Ivanovo Selo, during the Croatian War of Independence.

== Background ==
The village of Ivanovo Selo is located in the Bjelovar-Bilogora County of Central Croatia. In 1991, the village had a population of 441 inhabitants, of which 335 were ethnically Czech, followed by Croats, Hungarians and Serbs.

With the beginning of the Croatian War of Independence, clashes between Croatian government and Serb rebel forces for the control of the Bilogora region of Western Slavonia intensified by September 1991.

Anticipating the conflict might reach Ivanovo Selo itself, 30 children from the village were evacuated to Czechoslovakia on the 28 June 1991.

== Killings ==
On 21 September 1991, local Serb rebels from surrounding villages attacked Ivanovo Selo, which was defended at the time by local volunteers. After a mortar attack, Serb forces advanced into the village from three directions. Upon entering the village, Serb rebels began to burn and loot civilian homes, forcing around 20 people at gunpoint to leave their basements and march ahead of them towards the village square as human shields, as a means to force those defending the village to surrender.

The captured civilians that had been lined up against a wall in the village square were suddenly hit by a rocket launched from a Serb armoured vehicle. It is believed this incident was caused by a misunderstanding, the Serbs in the armoured vehicle believing they were being fired upon.

Five civilians and one Serb soldier were killed in the explosion, another six civilians were wounded. Croatian reinforcements arrived soon after from the nearby town of Daruvar, forcing the Serb forces to withdraw from Ivanovo Selo. During their retreat, Serbs forces killed another two civilians.

After fully recapturing the village, those wounded in the massacre were immediately sent for hospital treatment in Daruvar. Two days later, those killed were buried in a common grave.
