= Lička Jesenica =

- Village
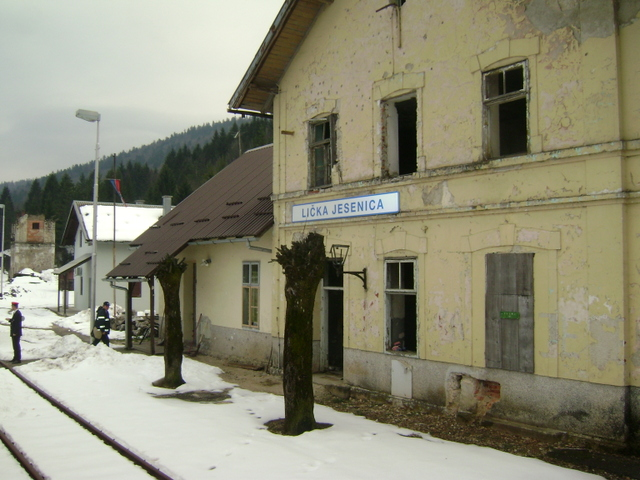
- Lička Jesenica railway station

- Location of Lička Jesenica in Croatia
- Coordinates: 44°59′47″N 15°26′29″E
- Country: Croatia
- Region: Continental Croatia
- County: Karlovac County
- Municipality: Saborsko

Area
  - Total: 34.6 km^{2} (13.4 sq mi)
- Elevation: 472 m (1,549 ft)

Population (2021)
  - Total: 73
  - Density: 2.1/km^{2} (5.5/sq mi)
- Time zone: UTC+1 (CET)
  - Summer (DST): UTC+2 (CEST)
- Postal code: 47306 Saborsko
- Area code: (+385) 47

Lička Jesenica is a settlement in the Lika region of Croatia, in the municipality of Saborsko, Karlovac County.

== History ==
In 1933, Chetnik formations were organised on the territory of Srpske Moravice, Gomirje and Lička Jesenica. They had a minor political influence until 1941 when a large number of them were killed in the first wave of liquidations.

=== WWII ===
In May 1941, the Ustaša government began targeting known and suspected JRZ members with arrests. The prominent JRZ members in Lička Jesenica at the time were Dušan Vukelić, Miljenko Milaković, Ilija Žutić and Stanislav Nasadil.

On 28 May in the afternoon, the first mass arrests were made by the Ustaše in Plaški, including of a teacher from Lička Jesenica. Initially, they were held in the jail in Plaški, then transferred to the Ogulin castle. There, they were held for about 20 days, forced by their captors to sing "Sprem'te se, sprem'te četnici" (a Chetnik anthem) while sweeping the streets. Around 6 June, late in the evening, they were led out of the Ogulin tower into its courtyard and lined up in a zig-zagging column. They were all forced to sign a document with "I the undersigned with my own hand sign that in the time of the Kingdom of Yugoslavia I acted against the interests of the Croat nation, the Ustaša movement and the Poglavnik" (Croatian: Ja niže potpisani vlastoručno se potpisujem da sam za vrijeme Kraljevine Jugoslavije radio protiv interesa hrvatskog naroda, ustaškog pokreta i Poglavnika). The next day, they were transported by train to the Danica concentration camp.

In late June or early July 1941, the priest in Jesenica was arrested. In early July, he had not yet been sent away. As of a 15 July document, all he had been sent to a concentration camp.

On 4 July 1942, Partisans destroyed 450 metres (1,480 ft) of track between Blato and Lička Jesenica. Italian soldiers arrived from Plaški on an armoured train and the Partisans retreated.

On 1–7 and 8 September, Partisans destroyed about 8 kilometres (5.0 mi) of railway between the Blato-Lička Jesenica and Javornik (Note: Opposite Saborsko.) stations. They burned 4 railway guardposts between Blato and Lička Jesenica and destroyed the water pump in Lička Jesenica. Italian railway guard troops engaged the Partisans in a 2 day battle. The Partisans killed 1 and wounded 8. After the Partisans left, it was estimated the repairs would take several days.

== Culture ==
Orthodox church of St Elias in Lička Jesenica was built in 1751. The village feast celebrating St. Elias, the saint protector of the village, is traditionally held on August the 2nd.

== Demographics ==
According to the 2011 census, the settlement of Lička Jesenica has 100 inhabitants. This represents 22.52% of its pre-war population according to the 1991 census.

The 1991 census recorded that 98.42% of the village population were ethnic Serbs (437/444), 0.23% were ethic Croats (1/444) and 1.35% were of other ethnic origin (6/444).

Historical population 1857-2011
v

population	910	984	988	1087	1150	1093	998	1268	1002	972	817	717	553	444	119	100
	1857	1869	1880	1890	1900	1910	1921	1931	1948	1953	1961	1971	1981	1991	2001	2011

Sources: Croatian Bureau of Statistics publications

== Sights ==
- St. Elias Orthodox Church
- Jasenica river
- the old bridge over the Jasenica river, dating back to 1810

== See also ==
- Saborsko massacre

== Bibliography ==
- Trgo, Fabijan, ed. (1964). Zbornik dokumenata i podataka o Narodno-oslobodilačkom ratu Jugoslovenskih naroda. Vol. V, 32.
