= Dereza, Požega-Slavonia County =

Coordinates: 45°29′N 17°13′E

Dereza
- Village
- Interactive map of Dereza
- Country: Croatia
- County: Požega-Slavonia
- Municipality: Pakrac

Area
  - Total: 9.4 km^{2} (3.6 sq mi)

Population (2021)
  - Total: 10
  - Density: 1.1/km^{2} (2.8/sq mi)
- Time zone: UTC+1 (CET)
  - Summer (DST): UTC+2 (CEST)

Dereza is a village in Croatia.
