= Mikleuš =

- Location within Croatia
- Coordinates: 45°37′12″N 17°48′0″E
- Country: Croatia
- County: Virovitica-Podravina County

Area
  - Total: 35.6 km^{2} (13.7 sq mi)

Population (2021)
  - Total: 1,067
  - Density: 30.0/km^{2} (77.6/sq mi)
- Time zone: UTC+1 (CET)
  - Summer (DST): UTC+2 (CEST)
- Website: mikleus.hr

Mikleuš is a village and municipality in Croatia in Virovitica-Podravina County.

In the 2011 census, it had a total population of 1,464, in the following settlements:

- Balinci, population 70
- Borik, population 326
- Četekovac, population 213
- Čojlug, population 15
- Mikleuš, population 840

In the same census, 91.6% were Croats and 6.22% Serbs.
