= Zlatko Aleksovski =

Bosnian Croat prison commander during the Bosnian war

- Born: 8 January 1960 (age 66); Pakrac, PR Croatia, FPR Yugoslavia
- Occupations: Croatian prison commander during Yugoslav wars; indicted by ICTY and sentenced to imprisonment for war crimes

Zlatko Aleksovski (born 8 January 1960) is a former Bosnian Croat prison commander during the Bosnian War who was indicted by the International Criminal Tribunal for the former Yugoslavia and sentenced to seven years imprisonment for unlawful treatment of prisoners in Lašva Valley area in Bosnia and Herzegovina.

== Early life ==
Zlatko Aleksovski was born in Pakrac, SR Croatia on 8 January 1960. Aleksovski grew up and was educated in the town of Zenica in SR Bosnia and Herzegovina of the SFR Yugoslavia. He later attained a degree from the University of Sarajevo in Sociology. After graduating from University, Aleksovski worked in the prison at Zenica as a prison officer from 1987 to 1992, in charge of rehabilitating and overseeing for the welfare of approximately fifty prisoners.

== Role in the Bosnian War ==
During the Croat–Bosniak War (part of the 1992–95 Bosnian War) Aleksovski was the prison commander of Kaonik prison in Busovača municipality from January to May 1993.

During this period he received several hundred Bosniak civilians from the Croatian Defence Council (HVO) at the detention centre in Kaonik.

During his command at Kaonik prison, the ICTY found that "Many detainees under his control were subjected to inhumane treatment, including excessive and cruel interrogation, physical and psychological harm, and forced labour, the detainees were also used as human shields and murdered or otherwise killed." After serving as prison commander at Kaonik, Aleksovski later served as HVO 'Head of District' at Mostar Prison in Bosnia and Herzegovina.

== Trial and imprisonment ==
=== Prosecutor v. Zlatko Aleksovski ===
On 8 June 1996 shortly after the end of the Bosnian War, Aleksovski was arrested by Croatian authorities in Split, before being transferred to the ICTY in The Hague, Netherlands on 28 April 1997. The Supreme Court of Croatia had authorised Aleksovski's extradition to The Hague, however he wasn't actually extradited until the United States had pressured Croatia to do so. On 2 November 1995 the ICTY charged Aleksovski of violating two articles of the ICTY Statute "on the basis of both individual criminal responsibility and superior criminal responsibility" per Article 7 of the ICTY Statute. Aleksovski was charged violating the following Articles of the ICTY Statute:

- Article 2 - inhuman treatment; wilfully causing great suffering or serious injury to body or health.
- Article 3 - outrages upon the personal dignity.

Aleksovski's first hearing took place in court on 29 April 1997 and he pleaded not guilty to all the charges against him. The trial commenced on 6 January 1998 and closed on 23 March 1999. Although the judgement found Aleksovski not guilty of violating Article 2, he was found guilty of violating Article 3.

On 7 May 1999 Aleksovski was initially sentenced to imprisonment for two and a half years.

=== Appeals ===
Aleksovski's defence filed an appeal (regarding the guilty verdict to Article 3) on 17 May 1999 and the prosecution countered with another appeal (regarding the not guilty verdict to Article 2 and the length of the sentence) on 19 May 1999. Due to the ongoing appeals Aleksovski was released from 7 May 1999 until 9 February 2000 when the ICTY ordered his re-arrest. The ICTY's Appeals Chamber came to a conclusion on 24 March 2000. The defence's appeal regarding the conviction was eventually denied, while the prosecution's appeal regarding the judgement and the sentence was allowed. The Appeals Chamber stated that Aleksovski was "the commander of the prison and as such the authority who could have prevented crimes in the prison and certainly should not have involved himself in them. An appropriate sentence should reflect these factors". Aleksovski's sentence was consequently increased to seven years imprisonment.

=== Imprisonment ===
On 22 September 2000, Aleksovski was transferred to Finland to serve the remainder of his seven-year prison sentence. Finland was one of the countries in agreement with the ICTY to enforce sentences. Aleksovski was released from prison a year later, on 14 November 2001.

== Personal life ==
Aleksovski describes himself as being an ethnic Croat. He is married with two children.
