= Kusonje =

- Village (Selo)
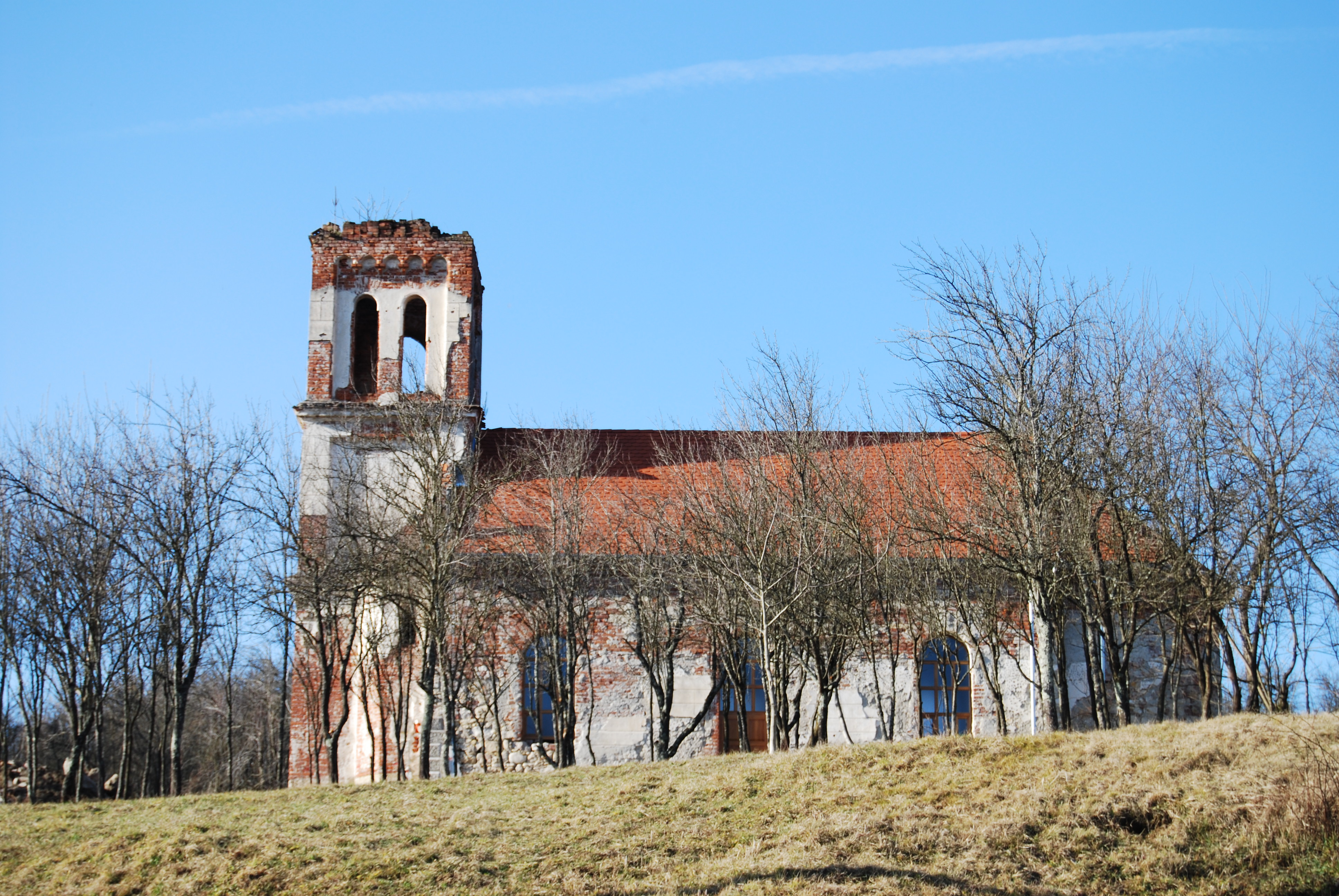
- Church of Saint George in Kusonje was built in 1732–34 and destroyed in 1942
- Interactive map of Kusonje
- Coordinates: 45°28′N 17°14′E
- Country: Croatia
- County: Požega-Slavonia
- Town: Pakrac

Area
  - Total: 5.8 sq mi (14.9 km^{2})

Population (2021)
  - Total: 257
  - Density: 44.7/sq mi (17.2/km^{2})
- Time zone: UTC+1 (CET)
  - Summer (DST): UTC+2 (CEST)
- Postal code: 34550 Pakrac

Kusonje (Serbian Cyrillic: Кусоње) is a village in Croatia in the town of Pakrac, Požega-Slavonia County. It is connected by the D38 road.

On 13 August 1942, during the Genocide of Serbs in the Independent State of Croatia in World War II, the local Serbian Orthodox Church was a site of Ustaše war crime in which 163 male residents over the age of 12 years from Kusonje and Dragović were murdered while women and children were sent to Stara Gradiška concentration camp.

Kusonje was the site of an ambush during the Croatian War of Independence in 1991, when 20 Croatian policemen and soldiers were massacred by Serb rebels.

== Demographics ==
According to the 2011 population census, the village of Kusonje had 308 inhabitants. This represents 27.97% of its pre-war population according to the 1991 census.

Population by ethnicity:

Year of census	total	Serbs	Croats	Yugoslavs	others
2011	308	187 (60.71%)	101 (32.79%)	-	20 (6.49%)
2001	200	n/a	n/a	-	n/a
1991	1 101	891 (80.93%)	99 (8.99%)	72 (6.54%)	39 (3.54%)
1981	1 047	685 (65.43%)	96 (9.17%)	247 (23.59%)	19 (1.81%)
1971	744	605 (81.32%)	123 (16.53%)	4 (0.54%)	12 (1.61%)
1961	658	555 (84.35%)	86 (13.07%)	1 (0.15%)	16 (2.43%)

Population change 1857-2011
v

population	432	480	523	598	767	909	886	916	450	519	658	744	1047	1101	200	308
	1857	1869	1880	1890	1900	1910	1921	1931	1948	1953	1961	1971	1981	1991	2001	2011

Sources: Croatian Bureau of Statistics publications

== History ==
Kusonje was part of Croatian medieval state. In 1543, Kusonje and the nearby town of Pakrac were conquered by the Ottoman Empire. The Ottoman rule lasted until it was seized and reconquered by the Austrians in 1691. Village had Serbian ethnic majority.

=== World War II ===
On 13 August 1942, during the Genocide of Serbs in the Independent State of Croatia in World War II, the local Serbian Orthodox Church was a site of Ustaša war crime in which 163 male residents over the age of 12 years from Kusonje and Dragović were murdered while women and children were sent to Stara Gradiška concentration camp. Learning about Ustaše atrocities in Pakrac region started hiding in nearby forests but were forced to return to villages to take care of their crops, animals and to take food which was used by authorities to capture them. After male residents over the age of 12 years were captured they were pushed inside the church, locked from the outside, and then the building was set it on fire. Those who did not fit in the church were slaughtered and thrown into nearby wells. The Ustaša crimes triggered revange violence against predominantly Croat village of Španovica where 129 residents were murdered.

=== Croatian War of Independence ===
In 1991, war broke out in Croatia, of which Kusonje and Pakrac were a part. The Yugoslav People's Army captured the town in March 1991, but it was soon retaken by Croatian forces.

== See also ==
- Battle of Kusonje
