= Tisovac, Tuzla =

Tisovac
- Village
- Location within Bosnia and Herzegovina
- Coordinates: 44.6005513°N 18.6439275°E
- Country: Bosnia and Herzegovina
- Entity: Federation of Bosnia and Herzegovina
- Canton: Tuzla
- Municipality: Tuzla

Area
  - Total: 0.73 sq mi (1.89 km^{2})

Population (2013)
  - Total: 69
  - Density: 95/sq mi (37/km^{2})
- Time zone: UTC+1 (CET)
  - Summer (DST): UTC+2 (CEST)

Tisovac is a village in the municipality of Tuzla, Tuzla Canton, Bosnia and Herzegovina.

== Demographics ==
According to the 2013 census, its population was 69.

Ethnicity in 2013
Ethnicity	Number	Percentage
Croats	68	98.6%
Serbs	1	1.4%
Total	69	100%
