= Bruška =

- Location of Bruška in Croatia
- Coordinates: 44.074893°N 15.73813°E
- Country: Croatia
- County: Zadar County

Area
  - Total: 14.5 km^{2} (5.6 sq mi)

Population (2021)
  - Total: 105
  - Density: 7.24/km^{2} (18.8/sq mi)

Bruška is a village located in inland Dalmatia, Croatia, northeast of Benkovac. The population is 113 (census 2011).

== See also ==
- Bruška massacre
