= Srednji Grahovljani =

- Village
- Location within Croatia
- Coordinates: 45.29°N 17.17°E
- Country: Croatia
- County: Požega-Slavonia
- Municipality: Pakrac

Area
  - Total: 9.7 km^{2} (3.7 sq mi)

Population (2021)
  - Total: 0
  - Density: 0.0/km^{2} (0.0/sq mi)
- Time zone: UTC+1 (CET)
  - Summer (DST): UTC+2 (CEST)

Srednji Grahovljani is a village in Pakrac, Croatia. It is located on the northeast of Pakrac, south of the Papuk mountain in western Slavonia. It is administratively part of the city of Pakrac and did not have residents in the 2011 census.
