= Dragović, Pakrac =

Dragović
- Village
- Location within Croatia
- Coordinates: 45°28′N 17°16′E
- Country: Croatia
- County: Požega-Slavonia
- Municipality: Pakrac

Area
  - Total: 10.3 km^{2} (4.0 sq mi)

Population (2021)
  - Total: 45
  - Density: 4.4/km^{2} (11/sq mi)
- Time zone: UTC+1 (CET)
  - Summer (DST): UTC+2 (CEST)

Dragović is a village in Croatia. It is connected by the D38 highway.
