= Zámostí-Blata =

- Municipality
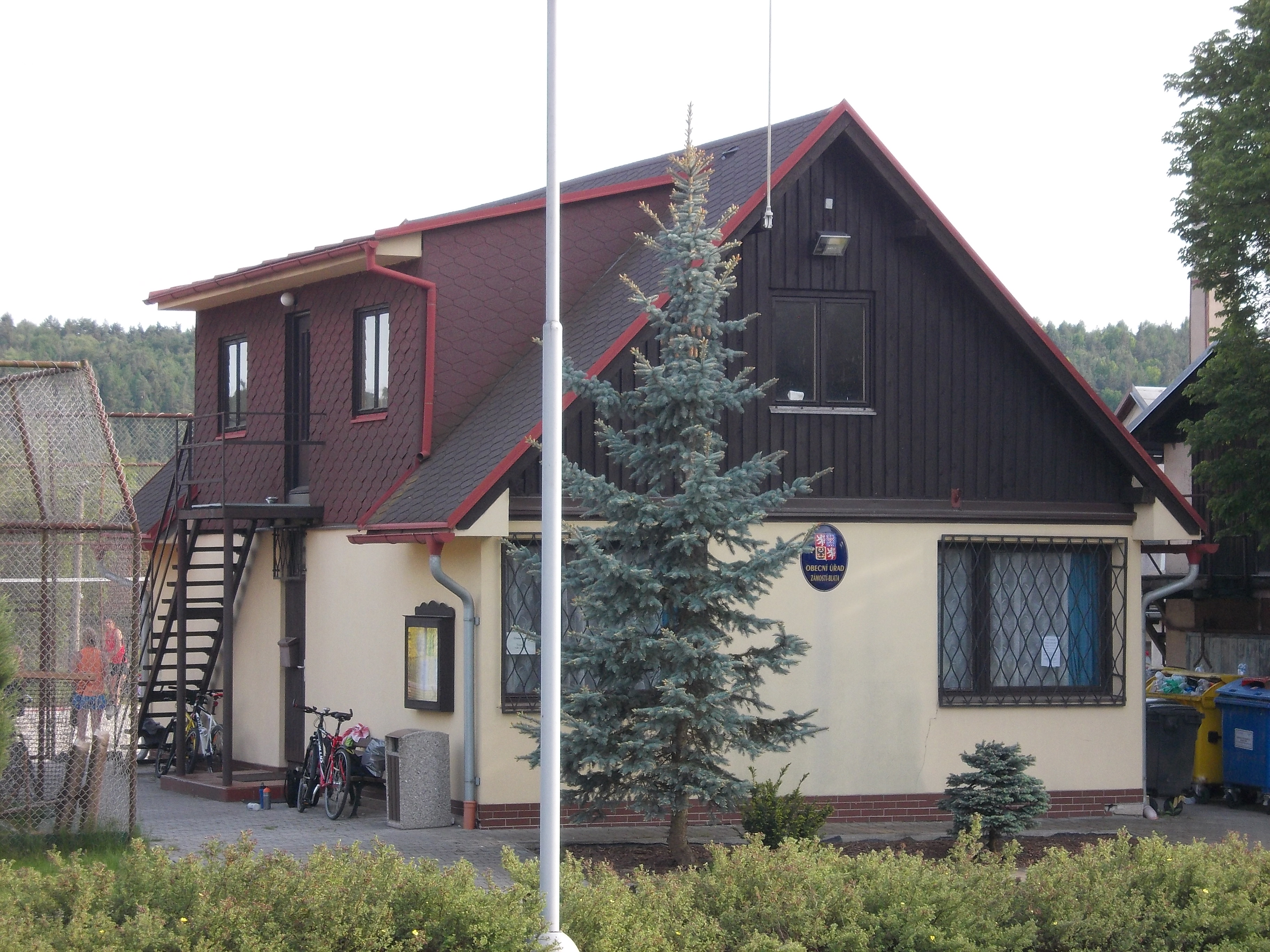
- Municipal office

- Location in the Czech Republic
- Coordinates: 50°28′15″N 15°15′14″E
- Country: Czech Republic
- Region: Hradec Králové
- District: Jičín
- First mentioned: 1542

Area
  - Total: 4.40 km^{2} (1.70 sq mi)
- Elevation: 292 m (958 ft)

Population (2026-01-01)
  - Total: 116
  - Density: 26.4/km^{2} (68.3/sq mi)
- Time zone: UTC+1 (CET)
  - Summer (DST): UTC+2 (CEST)
- Postal code: 506 01
- Website: www.zamosti-blata.cz

Zámostí-Blata is a municipality in Jičín District in the Hradec Králové Region of the Czech Republic. It has about 100 inhabitants.

== Administrative division ==
Zámostí-Blata consists of two municipal parts (in brackets population according to the 2021 census):

- Zámostí (22)
- Blata (106)

== Demographics ==
Historical population
Year	Pop.	±%
1869	255	—
1880	313	+22.7%
1890	312	−0.3%
1900	291	−6.7%
1910	286	−1.7%
1921	264	−7.7%
1930	265	+0.4%
1950	173	−34.7%
1961	172	−0.6%
1970	153	−11.0%
1980	124	−19.0%
1991	78	−37.1%
2001	78	+0.0%
2011	131	+67.9%
2021	128	−2.3%
Source: Censuses
