= Medari massacre =

1995 Croatian war of independence massacre

- Location: Medari, Croatia
- Date: 1 May 1995
- Target: Croatian Serb civilians
- Attack type: Mass killing
- Deaths: 22
- Perpetrator: Croatian Army (HV)

The Medari massacre was the mass murder of 22 Croatian Serb civilians on 1 May 1995 by members of the Croatian Army (HV) during Operation Flash.

== Background ==
In 1990, following the electoral defeat of the government of the Socialist Republic of Croatia by the Croatian Democratic Union (Croatian: Hrvatska demokratska zajednica, HDZ), ethnic tensions between Croats and Serbs worsened. The self-styled Republic of Serb Krajina (RSK) declared its intention to secede from Croatia and join the Republic of Serbia while the Government of the Republic of Croatia declared it a rebellion. In June 1991 Croatia declared independence from Yugoslavia. Tensions eventually broke out into full-scale war, which lasted until 1995.

From May 1–3, 1995, the Croatian Army conducted Operation Flash against the RSK. The military operation succeeded in capturing 558-square-kilometre territory in Western Slavonia from RSK forces.

== Massacre ==
On 1 May 1995, according to Zagreb-based NGO Documenta and the Croatian Helsinki Committee, the Croatian Army killed 22 civilians, including 11 women and three children, in the village of Medari near Nova Gradiška in Western Slavonia. Two sisters, Radmila and Mirjana Vukovic survived the massacre by chance because they went to high school in a nearby town in Bosnia and Herzegovina. Their father, mother and seven-year-old sister were killed that day.

== Aftermath ==
After the NGOs filed complaints with the State's Attorney Office of the Republic of Croatia in Slavonski Brod, the police did not file criminal charges in relation to the event as late as 2006.

In April 2012, the State's Attorney Office of the Republic of Croatia in Osijek published that a criminal complaint was filed about the case on 15 September 2010, and that they were conducting an investigation into it. In May 2013, they said they made inquiries with witnesses and relatives of the victims in collaboration with Serbian authorities, and requested more information from the ICTY and an investigation from the police.

In 2021, the investigation was still pending, and the only active court cases about it in Croatia were the lawsuits filed by families of the victims, notably the constitutional complaints from the survivors about the ineffectiveness of the legal system in handling their case.

== Sources ==
- "U emisiji "In medias res" objavljene netočne tvrdnje" ["In medias res" show publicized false claims] (in Croatian). State Attorney's Office (Croatia). May 2012.
- "Županijsko državno odvjetništvo u Osijeku - Odgovor na upite novinara" [Country State Attorney's Office in Osijek - Response to press inquiries] (in Croatian). State Attorney's Office (Croatia). 13 May 2013.
