= Poljanak and Vukovići massacres =

Mass murder of Croat civilians, 1991

- Part of the Croatian War of Independence
- Poljanak on the map of Croatia, JNA/SAO Krajina-held areas in late 1991 are highlighted in red
- Location: Poljanak, Croatia
- Date: 7 November 1991
- Target: Croats
- Attack type: Mass killing
- Deaths: 10
- Perpetrators: JNA, Territorial Defense, SAO Krajina forces

The Poljanak and Vukovići massacres was the mass murder of Croat civilians in the villages of Poljanak and Vukovići committed by SAO Krajina forces, supported by the JNA and TO forces on 7 November 1991.

== Background ==
In August 1990, an insurrection took place in Croatia centred on the predominantly Serb-populated areas, including parts of Lika, around the city of Gospić, with significant Serb populations. The areas were subsequently named SAO Krajina and, after declaring its intention to integrate with Serbia, the Government of Croatia declared it to be a rebellion. By March 1991, the conflict escalated into the Croatian War of Independence. In June 1991, Croatia declared its independence as Yugoslavia disintegrated. A three-month moratorium followed, after which the decision came into effect on 8 October.

As the Yugoslav People's Army (JNA) increasingly supported the SAO Krajina, the Croatian Police were unable to cope. Thus, the Croatian National Guard (ZNG) was formed in May 1991. The development of the military of Croatia was hampered by a UN arms embargo introduced in September, while the military conflict in Croatia continued to escalate—the Battle of Vukovar started on 26 August. By the end of August the fighting intensified in Lika as well, specifically as the Battle of Gospić continued through much of September.

Poljanak and Vukovići were small villages, located in the Lika region of central Croatia, not far from the Plitvice Lakes National Park and the town of Slunj. In 1991, both villages had a Croat-majority. For example, Poljanak had pre-war population of 160 inhabitants (145 Croats, 5 Serbs, one Yugoslav and 9 others), according to a 1991 census.

== Killings ==
On 7 November 1991, Serb forces, consisting of local SAO Krajina militia, supported by JNA and TO forces, including an elite JNA parachute brigade from Niš, entered the village of Poljanak and its neighbouring hamlet of Vukovići. Serb forces raided the houses of Croats who had not been able to flee, murdering eight civilians in Vukovići and two in Poljanak.

All ten victims were elderly civilians (eight men and two women), the eldest being 80-year-old Dane Vuković Matin, from Vukovići. Apart from one victim, killed by injuries caused by an explosive, all of the victims from Vukovići were killed by automatic weapons. The two victims from Poljanak, a father and his son, were hanged outside of their home.

Those who survived the massacre, or those that had escaped beforehand (mostly women), were forced to flee to nearby Slunj or Cazin, in neighbouring Bosnia and Herzegovina.

After the massacre, Croat homes were burned and looted.

== Aftermath ==
The killings of the civilians from Poljanak and Vukovići were included in the International Criminal Tribunal for the former Yugoslavia (ICTY) trial of Milan Martić, and the trial of Slobodan Milošević.

Milan Martić was initially found guilty for the crimes in Poljanak and Vukovići, however, a 2008 appeals verdict absolved Martić of command responsibility for the massacres in Poljanak and Vukovići on 7 November 1991. Despite this, Martić's initial 35-year sentence for Crimes against humanity and violations of the laws or customs of war across other areas of Croatia was upheld.
