= Saborsko =

- Municipality
- Saborsko
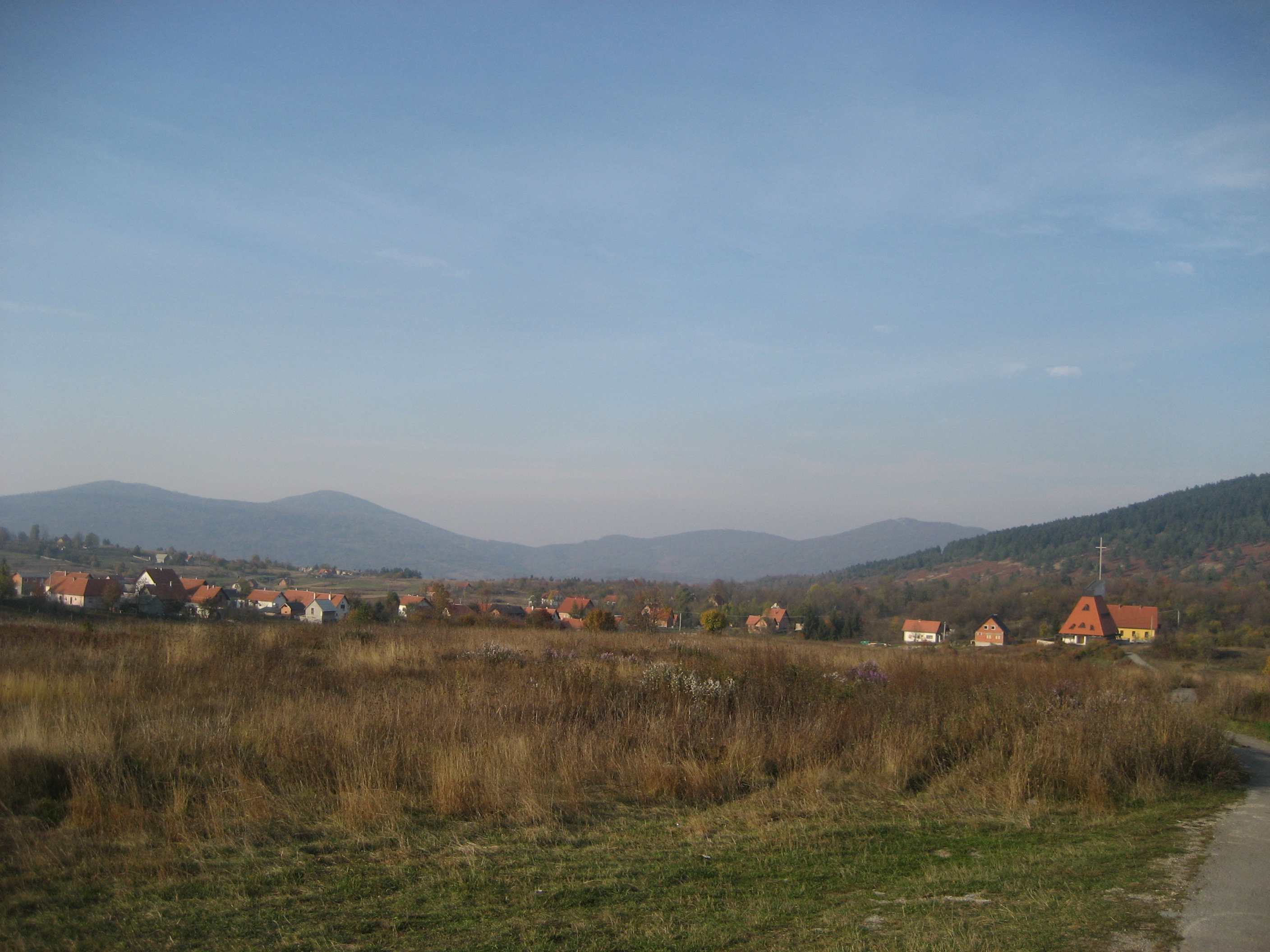

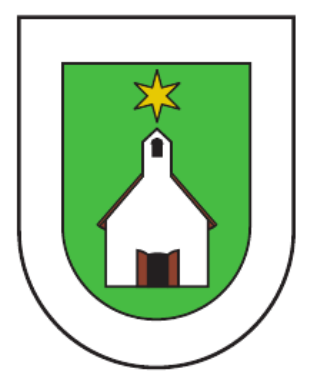
- Coat of arms

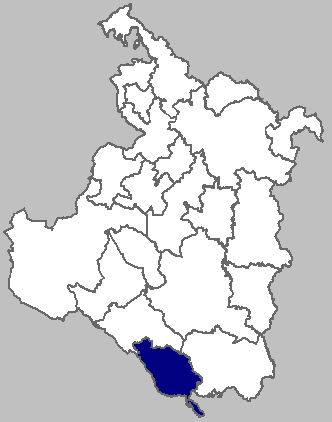
- Map of the municipality within Karlovac County

- Location of Saborsko in Croatia
- Coordinates: 44.983704°N 15.476411°E
- Country: Croatia
- Region: Central Croatia
- County: Karlovac County

Area
  - Municipality: 132.4 km^{2} (51.1 sq mi)
  - Urban: 69.8 km^{2} (26.9 sq mi)
- Elevation: 607 m (1,991 ft)

Population (2021)
  - Municipality: 466
  - Density: 3.52/km^{2} (9.12/sq mi)
  - Urban: 331
  - Urban density: 4.74/km^{2} (12.3/sq mi)
- Time zone: UTC+1 (CET)
  - Summer (DST): UTC+2 (CEST)
- Postal code: 47306 Saborsko
- Area code: (+385) 047
- Website: saborsko.hr

Saborsko is a village and municipality in Karlovac County, Croatia. The municipality is part of the Lika region.

== Geography ==
It is country-side mountain resort, situated in a curved, long and narrow valley. The altitude of the place is 630–900 m. 1 / 4 of the Saborsko is located in National Park Plitvice Lakes.

== Demographics ==
In the 2011 census, the total municipality population was 632, in the following settlements:

- Begovac, population 16
- Blata, population 54
- Lička Jesenica, population 100
- Saborsko, population 462

In the 2001 census, the municipality of Saborsko had 860 inhabitants, of whom 78.5% (675) were Croats and 19.19% (165) were ethnic Serbs.

Saborsko inhabited place:

- 2001 - 666
- 1991 - 852 (Croats - 800 Serbs - 18, other - 34)
- 1981 - 1127 (Croats - 1081, Serbs - 38, Yugoslavs - 4, others - 4)
- 1971 - 1,519 (Croats - 1476, Serbs - 34, Yugoslavs - 1, other - 8)
- 1961 - 1832
- 1951 - 2062
- 1948 - 2165

== History ==
Saborsko is first mentioned in the Modruš Feudal Law in 1486.

After the Invasion of Yugoslavia, relations between the Italians and the Ustaša were tense, but Saborsko was marked by more such tension than most areas, to the extent that on the 28th and 29 April 1941 the Italians detained 6 Ustaše.

On 1–7 and 8 September, Partisans destroyed about 8 kilometres (5.0 mi) of railway between the Blato-Lička Jesenica and Javornik (Note: Opposite Saborsko.) stations. They burned 4 railway guardposts between Blato and Lička Jesenica and destroyed the water pump in Lička Jesenica. Italian railway guard troops engaged the Partisans in a 2 day battle. The Partisans killed 1 and wounded 8. After the Partisans left, it was estimated the repairs would take several days.

In World War II, the Chetniks killed 48 civilians in Saborsko, including seven boys and girls.

In the Croatian War of Independence, Croatian troops defended Saborsko for several months until falling in November 1991, after the JNA and nearly 1000 members of paramilitary groups broke the defences, armed with nine military aircraft, 43 tanks, howitzers and a dozen MRL's. The assault destroyed several homes and the Parish Church. The Yugoslav forces executed the Saborsko massacre, in which 29 civilians were killed. A total of 48 citizens of Saborsko were killed in 1991.

The rate at which refugees returned after the war was slow, due to the lack of housing, jobs, and the danger of mines. At first, only the elderly people returned. The Croatian Government began the rebuilding of family homes and common buildings, including the Parish Church. Even so, few families have returned, especially those with children.

== Nature ==
The beauty of Saborsko is most evident in the forest mountain nature. The area has lots of mountain streams, lakes, dense forests and countless species of wildlife. To be preserved further, many areas of the municipality Saborsko are protected.

- Mala Kapela mountain
- Lake Blata
- River Jesenica

Protected areas

- Part of the National Park Plitvice Lakes
- Čorkova uvala

== Monuments and landmarks ==
- The old parish church from 1726, worldwide cultural heritage monument.
- The parish church of St. John Nepomuk built in 2001
- Monument to the fallen Croatian soldiers

== Infrastructure ==
In 1913, there were 8 gendarmeries in Delnice kotar: Ogulin, Drežnica, Generalski Stol, Jasenak, Saborsko, Josipdol, Modruš and Plaški.

== Bibliography ==
=== History ===
- Trgo, Fabijan, ed. (1964). Zbornik dokumenata i podataka o Narodno-oslobodilačkom ratu Jugoslovenskih naroda. Vol. V, 32.
- Lopašić, Radoslav (1894). "Urbar Modruški od g. 1486" [The Modruš Urbarium of the Year 1486]. Hrvatski urbari. Monumenta historico-iuridica Slavorum meridionalium (in Croatian). Vol. 5, 1. pp. 20–81.
  - Republished: Lopašić, Radoslav (1997). Abramović, Ignacije (ed.). Urbar modruški [The Modruš Urbarium] (in Croatian). Ogulin: Ogranak Matice hrvatske. ISBN 953-96393-4-4. Tirage: 500.
