= Bučje, Pakrac =

Bučje
- Village
- Location within Croatia
- Coordinates: 45°27′44″N 17°24′09″E
- Country: Croatia
- Region: Slavonia
- County: Požega-Slavonia
- City: Pakrac

Area
  - Total: 2.5 km^{2} (0.97 sq mi)
- Elevation: 355 m (1,165 ft)

Population (2021)
  - Total: 13
  - Density: 5.2/km^{2} (13/sq mi)
- Time zone: UTC+1 (CET)
  - Summer (DST): UTC+2 (CEST)
- Postal code: 34553
- Area code: 034

Bučje is a village in Požega-Slavonia County, Croatia. The village is administered as a part of the City of Pakrac. According to national census of 2011, population of the village is 17. The village is connected by the D38 state road.
