= Četekovac massacre =

1991 mass murder of Croat civilians

- Četekovac on the map of Croatia
- Location: 45.610569°N 17.757200°E; Četekovac, Croatia
- Date: 3 September 1991
- Target: Croats
- Attack type: Mass murder, ethnic cleansing
- Deaths: 23
- Perpetrator: Serb paramilitaries

The Četekovac massacre was the mass murder of Croat civilians and POWs by Serb forces on 3 September 1991, in the villages of Četekovac, Balinci and Čoljug, near Podravska Slatina.

== Background ==
With the onset of the Croatian War of Independence throughout the summer of 1991, Serb forces declared the creation of their own "Serbian Autonomous Oblast" across much of Western Slavonia on 12 August 1991. By September 1991, Serb forces had advanced up to the Croatian town of Podravska Slatina and had attacked and ethnically cleansed many Croat villages along the way.

== Killings ==
Local Serb paramilitaries began an attack on the Croat villages of Četekovac, Balinci and Čoljug on 3 September 1991. The villages were indiscriminately shelled using mortars, tanks and hand-held rocket launchers, deliberately targeting civilian houses. Serb paramilitaries then advanced through the villages, ambushing and shooting at civilians in their cars and breaking into Croat homes and executing civilians they found hiding or trying to flee. During the advance between Balinci and Četekovac, Serb paramilitaries forced a group of Croat civilians to march ahead of them as human shields. Serb paramilitaries also captured and executed two disarmed MUP police officers.

Some 59 Croat homes were torched or blown up, including the local church of St. Nikola Tavelić, and property and vehicles were looted or destroyed. 20 Croat civilians and two police officer POWs were killed during the massacre, including five women. The victims were aged between 18 and 91 years old, however most of the victims were elderly or infirm. All five women victims were over the age of 60. Nearly all of the victims had been killed with automatic firearms, while one was stabbed and another's body was burned.
