= Gornji Lađevac =

- Village
- Location within Croatia
- Coordinates: 45°05′N 15°38′E
- Country: Croatia
- County: Karlovac County
- City: Slunj

Area
  - Total: 0.8 km^{2} (0.31 sq mi)

Population (2021)
  - Total: 45
  - Density: 56/km^{2} (150/sq mi)
- Time zone: UTC+1 (CET)
  - Summer (DST): UTC+2 (CEST)
- Postal code: 47240
- Area code: +385 047

Gornji Lađevac is a village in Croatia, under the Slunj township, in Karlovac County.
