= Borovo Naselje massacre =

Massacre during the Croatian War of Independence

- Part of the Croatian War of Independence
- Borovo Naselje on the map of Croatia, JNA/SAO Krajina-held areas in late 1991 are highlighted in red
- Location: Borovo Naselje, Croatia
- Date: 19 November 1991
- Target: Croats
- Attack type: Mass killing, ethnic cleansing
- Deaths: 166
- Perpetrators: JNA and other Serb Paramilitary groups

The Borovo Naselje massacre was the mass murder of 166 Croat and other non-Serb civilians and POWs by Serb forces on 19 November 1991 in the Vukovar suburb of Borovo Naselje, shortly after the Battle of Vukovar.

== Background ==
Borovo Naselje is a suburb of the town of Vukovar, located 4 kilometres northwest of the Vukovar town centre. Prior to the start of the Croatian War of Independence, Borovo Naselje was well known for its Borovo Commerce Factory, that produced footwear, as part of the Borovo branch of the Bata Corporation.

During the Battle of Vukovar, Borovo Naselje was held by Croat forces and suffered from heavy fighting and shelling by JNA and other Serb forces.

Due to fears of overcrowding at the main Vukovar Hospital, it was decided to create an impromptu reserve hospital in the Borovo Commerce Factory. During the siege, the reserve hospital at the Borovo Commerce building was used to treat and shelter 800 injured soldiers and local civilians.

Croat forces in Vukovar surrendered on the 18th November 1991. During that time, 176 civilians and soldiers died during the fighting in Borovo Naselje.

== Killings ==
JNA and other Serb paramilitary forces entered Borovo Naselje on 19 November 1991 and killed 51 local civilians. Serb forces then entered the Borovo Commerce building hospital, forcibly removing 115 soldiers and civilians, many of whom were wounded, subsequently executing all of those removed in various locations in Borovo Naselje and the wider Vukovar area. Many of the bodies were thrown into the river Danube.

Others from Borovo Naselje that were not killed or expelled were sent to various detention camps in Serbia.

== Aftermath ==
The remains of 48 people that were taken from the Borovo Commerce building are still missing to this day.

In 2002, Croatia issued an arrest warrant for Milan Gojković, charged with criminal acts related to the selection, abuse and killings of civilians and POWs from the Borovo Commerce building on 19 November 1991. Gojković had already been sentenced in absentia to 20 years in a court ruling 1997.

Gojković was extradited from Norway in 2019 and was found guilty on two counts of war crimes against civilians and prisoners of war and sentenced in 2021 by an Osijek county court to 9 years of imprisonment.
