= Medari =

- Village
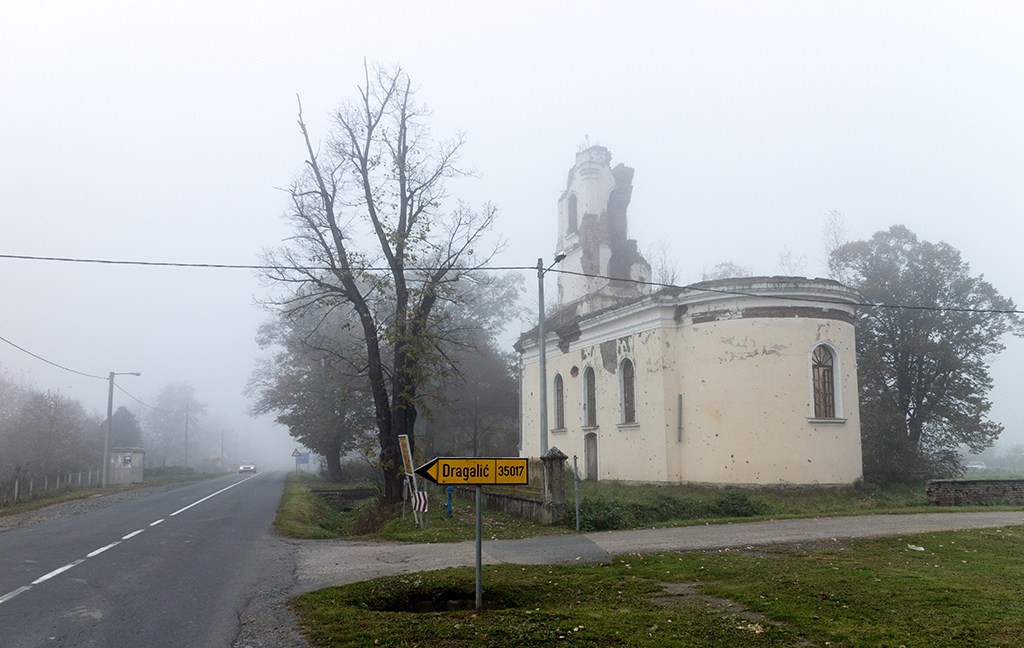
- Interactive map of Medari
- Location within Croatia
- Coordinates: 45°16′01″N 17°17′24″E
- Country: Croatia
- County: Brod-Posavina
- Municipality: Dragalić

Area
  - Total: 4.6 km^{2} (1.8 sq mi)

Population (2021)
  - Total: 131
  - Density: 28/km^{2} (74/sq mi)
- Time zone: UTC+1 (CET)
  - Summer (DST): UTC+2 (CEST)
- Postal code: 35429
- Area code: 035

Medari is a village in municipality of Dragalić in Brod-Posavina County, Croatia.

The Medari massacre took place in this village on 1 May 1995.
