= Četekovac =

- Village
- Location within Croatia
- Coordinates: 45°36′36″N 17°45′18″E
- Country: Croatia
- County: Virovitica-Podravina County
- Municipality: Mikleuš

Area
  - Total: 2.9 km^{2} (1.1 sq mi)
- Elevation: 149 m (489 ft)

Population (2021)
  - Total: 180
  - Density: 62/km^{2} (160/sq mi)
- Time zone: UTC+1 (CET)
  - Summer (DST): UTC+2 (CEST)
- Postal code: 33517
- Area code: (+385) 033
- Vehicle registration: CL

Četekovac is a village in Croatia.
