= Poljanak =

- Village
- Interactive map of Poljanak
- Location within Croatia
- Coordinates: 44.92175°N 15.59833°E
- Country: Croatia
- County: Lika-Senj
- Municipality: Plitvička Jezera

Area
  - Total: 3.23 sq mi (8.37 km^{2})

Population (2021)
  - Total: 82
  - Density: 25/sq mi (9.8/km^{2})
- Time zone: UTC+1 (CET)
  - Summer (DST): UTC+2 (CEST)

Poljanak is a village in Plitvička Jezera, Croatia. It is connected by the D42 road, which runs straight through the village.
