= Stubalj =

Coordinates: 45°16′07″N 16°32′27″E

- Village
- Interactive map of Stubalj
- Country: Croatia
- County: Sisak-Moslavina County

Area
  - Total: 4.2 km^{2} (1.6 sq mi)

Population (2021)
  - Total: 136
  - Density: 32/km^{2} (84/sq mi)
- Time zone: UTC+1 (CET)
  - Summer (DST): UTC+2 (CEST)

Stubalj is a village in Croatia. It is connected by the D224 highway.
