= Ivanovo Selo =

- Village
- Location within Croatia
- Country: Croatia
- County: Bjelovar-Bilogora County
- Municipality: Grubišno Polje

Area
  - Total: 2.4 sq mi (6.3 km^{2})

Population (2021)
  - Total: 215
  - Density: 88/sq mi (34/km^{2})
- Time zone: UTC+1 (CET)
  - Summer (DST): UTC+2 (CEST)

Ivanovo Selo is a village in Croatia.

== Demographics ==
According to the 2021 census, its population was 215. It was 264 in 2011.
