= Banija killings =

Mass murder of Croatian Serbs on the 22nd August 1991

- Location: Villages in Banija, near Sisak, Croatia
- Date: 22 August 1991
- Target: Croatian Serbs
- Attack type: Mass killing
- Deaths: 15
- Perpetrators: Croatian Special Police (MUP); Croatian Army (HV)

The Banija killings was the mass murder of Croatian Serbs by Croatian forces on 22 August 1991 in several villages of the Banija region.

== Background ==
In the spring of 1991 the armed conflict in Croatia began and several villages near Sisak, including Blinjski Kut and Kinjačka, were soon occupied by Serbian paramilitary forces. According to the Croatian Government, on 22 August 1991 Croatian forces carried out a military operation codenamed "Night Guard", in which they attempted to regain control from Serbian forces over several villages in the Sisak area, including Blinjski Kut.

== Killings ==
On 22 August 1991, Croatian forces carried out military action on majority Serb villages of Blinjski Kut, Kinjačka Gornja, Kinjačka Donja, Blinjska Greda, Bestrma, Trnjane, Čakala and Brdjane, in which 15 people were killed. Most of the casualties were civilians, but some clashed with Croatian forces, as evidenced by the deaths of five soldiers.
