= Pakrac =

- Town
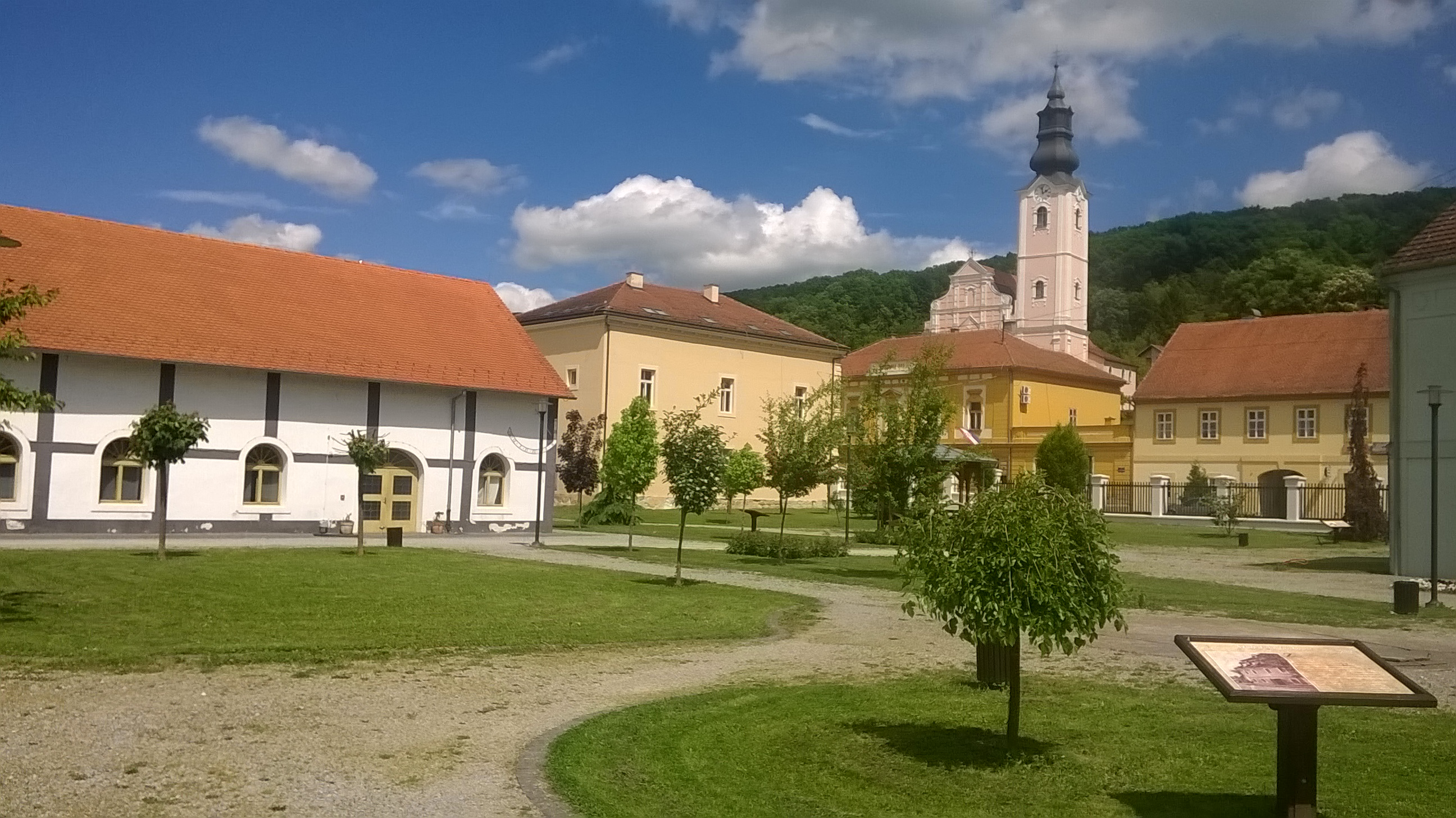
- View of Pakrac
- Interactive map of Pakrac
- Location of Pakrac in Croatia
- Coordinates: 45.4379°N 17.1926°E
- Country: Croatia
- Region: Slavonia (Požega Valley)
- County: Požega-Slavonia County

Government
  - Mayor: Tomislav Novinc (HDZ)

Area
  - Town: 358.2 km^{2} (138.3 sq mi)
  - Urban: 12.2 km^{2} (4.7 sq mi)

Population (2021)
  - Town: 7,086
  - Density: 19.78/km^{2} (51.24/sq mi)
  - Urban: 4,151
  - Urban density: 340/km^{2} (881/sq mi)
- Time zone: UTC+1 (Central European Time)
- Website: pakrac.hr

Pakrac is a town in western Slavonia, Croatia, population 4,151, total municipality population 7,086 (census 2021). Pakrac is located on the road and railroad connecting the regions of Posavina and Podravina.

== Name ==
In Croatian the town is known as Pakrac, in Serbian Cyrillic as Пакрац, in German as Pakratz, in Hungarian as Pakrác.

== History ==
The town was first mentioned in 1237. It was captured by the Ottoman Empire in 1543. It was initially a kaza centre in the Sanjak of Pojega between 1543 and 1552, then in the Sanjak of Pakrac in the Rumelia Eyalet between 1552 and 1559. Later it was the centre of the Sanjak of Pakrac between 1559 and 1601, when the sanjak seat was moved to Cernik. The Ottoman rule in Pakrac lasted until the Austrians captured it in 1691. In the late 19th and early 20th centuries, Pakrac was part of the Požega County of the Kingdom of Croatia-Slavonia.

Hostilities during the Yugoslav wars in Pakrac began on August 18, 1991, when Serb troops shelled the town from positions in the nearby hills. The Croats in Pakrac quickly organized in self-defense units. In a ceasefire signed in January 1992, the town was divided into Croatian and Serbian sectors. UNPROFOR was stationed at the demarcation line. In the Serbian part of Pakrac, Krajina Serb military leadership operated the Bučje concentration camp (18 km outside Pakrac), where Croat civilians and Serbs who opposed the Krajina government were imprisoned and killed. In early May 1995, east Pakrac was retaken by Croats in Operation Flash in the last phase of the Croatian War of Independence. Serbs who were living in east Pakrac soon left the area in large numbers.

== Demographics ==
In the census of 1991, the municipality of Pakrac (today cities Pakrac and Lipik) encompassed a different, larger area and its population was as follows:

total	Serbs	Croats	Yugoslavs	others
27,589	12,813 (46.44%)	9,896 (35.86%)	1,346 (4.87%)	3,534 (12.80%)

In the census of 2021, the municipality of Pakrac comprised:

total	Croats	Serbs	others
7,086	5,428 (76.60%)	801 (11.30%)	857 (12.09%)

Town of Pakrac: Population trends 1857–2021
v

population	8030	10195	10234	13496	15975	18422	17640	20361	15961	17003	17644	17023	16475	16367	8855	8460	7086
	1857	1869	1880	1890	1900	1910	1921	1931	1948	1953	1961	1971	1981	1991	2001	2011	2021

Sources: Croatian Bureau of Statistics publications

=== Settlements ===
The municipality consists of 42 settlements:

- Badljevina, population 733
- Batinjani, population 38
- Bjelajci, population 0
- Branešci, population 48
- Brusnik, population 19
- Bučje, population 17
- Cicvare, population 0
- Cikote, population 7
- Dereza, population 13
- Donja Obrijež, population 235
- Donja Šumetlica, population 6
- Donji Grahovljani, population 33
- Dragović, population 64
- Glavica, population 12
- Gornja Obrijež, population 81
- Gornja Šumetlica, population 65
- Gornji Grahovljani, population 8
- Jakovci, population 0
- Kapetanovo Polje, population 35
- Koturić, population 11
- Kraguj, population 77
- Kričke, population 19
- Kusonje, population 308
- Lipovac, population 0
- Mali Banovac, population 13
- Mali Budići, population 2
- Novi Majur, population 104
- Omanovac, population 147
- Ožegovci, population 34
- Pakrac, population 4,842
- Ploštine, population 108
- Popovci, population 10
- Prekopakra, population 1,066
- Prgomelje, population 1
- Rogulje, population 3
- Srednji Grahovljani, population 0
- Stari Majur, population 24
- Španovica, population 23
- Tisovac, population 4
- Toranj, population 75
- Veliki Banovac, population 171
- Veliki Budići, population 4

== Politics ==
=== Mayor ===
The mayor, elected in the 2025 local elections, is Tomislav Novinc, belonging to the Croatian Democratic Union. He won with the 57,7% of votes, against the Social Democratic Party candidate Zoran Krejči.

=== Minority councils ===
Directly elected minority councils and representatives are tasked with consulting tasks for the local or regional authorities in which they are advocating for minority rights and interests, integration into public life and participation in the management of local affairs. At the 2023 Croatian national minorities councils and representatives elections Czechs (elected 13 members), Serbs and Italians of Croatia each fulfilled legal requirements to elect 15 members minority councils of the Town of Pakrac.

== Sports ==
The local chapter of the HPS is HPD "Psunj", which had 80 members in 1936 under the Josip Svoboda presidency. It organised 35 expeditions in 1937. Membership rose to 94 in 1938.

== Notable people from Pakrac ==
- Ivan Šreter, Croatian physician who was persecuted by Yugoslav authorities for using the Croatian language.He was killed in 1991 by Serbs in the Croatian War of Independence.
- Zlatko Aleksovski, Bosnian-Croat prison commander and convicted war criminal
- Smilja Avramov, Serbian international law expert
- Zoran Erceg, Serbian basketball player
- Jadranka Kosor, former Prime Minister of Croatia
- Žarko Potočnjak, Croatian theatre, television and film actor.
- Sven Lasta, Croatian television and film actor.
- Slobodan Selenić, Serbian writer.
- Đorđe Bogić, Serbian Orthodox priest
- Saša Krajnović, Serbian footballer
- Zoran Popović, Serbian footballer

== Sources ==
- Erikson, Kai (2017). The Sociologist's Eye: Reflections on Social Life. Yale University Press. ISBN 0300231776.
