= Saborsko massacre =

1991 massacre in Saborsko, Croatia

Coordinates: 44.983486°N 15.478811°E

- Part of the Croatian War of Independence
- Saborsko on the map of Croatia, JNA/SAO Krajina-held areas in late 1991 are highlighted in red
- Location: Saborsko, Croatia
- Date: 12 November 1991
- Target: Croat civilians
- Attack type: Mass murder, ethnic cleansing
- Deaths: 29
- Perpetrators: SAO Krajina Territorial Defence Forces and the Yugoslav People's Army

The Saborsko massacre (Pokolj u Saborskom, Operacija Saborsko) was the killing of 29 Croat residents of the village of Saborsko on 12 November 1991, following the seizure of the village in a Yugoslav People's Army (Jugoslovenska Narodna Armija – JNA) and Croatian Serb offensive during the Croatian War of Independence. The fall of the town occurred as part of a JNA and Croatian Serb operation to capture a Croatian-held pocket centered on the town of Slunj, southeast of Karlovac. While the bulk of the civilian population fled with the surviving Croatian forces, those who remained in Saborsko were rounded up and either killed or expelled. The bodies of the victims were retrieved from two mass graves and several individual graves in 1995.

The capture of Saborsko and the killing and expulsion of its civilian population was included in the International Criminal Tribunal for the former Yugoslavia (ICTY) indictments of Milan Babić and Milan Martić, high-ranking officials of the Croatian Serb-declared wartime breakaway region of SAO Krajina. Following the war, the ICTY convicted Babić and Martić for their role in the events. Saborsko was subsequently rebuilt.

== Background ==
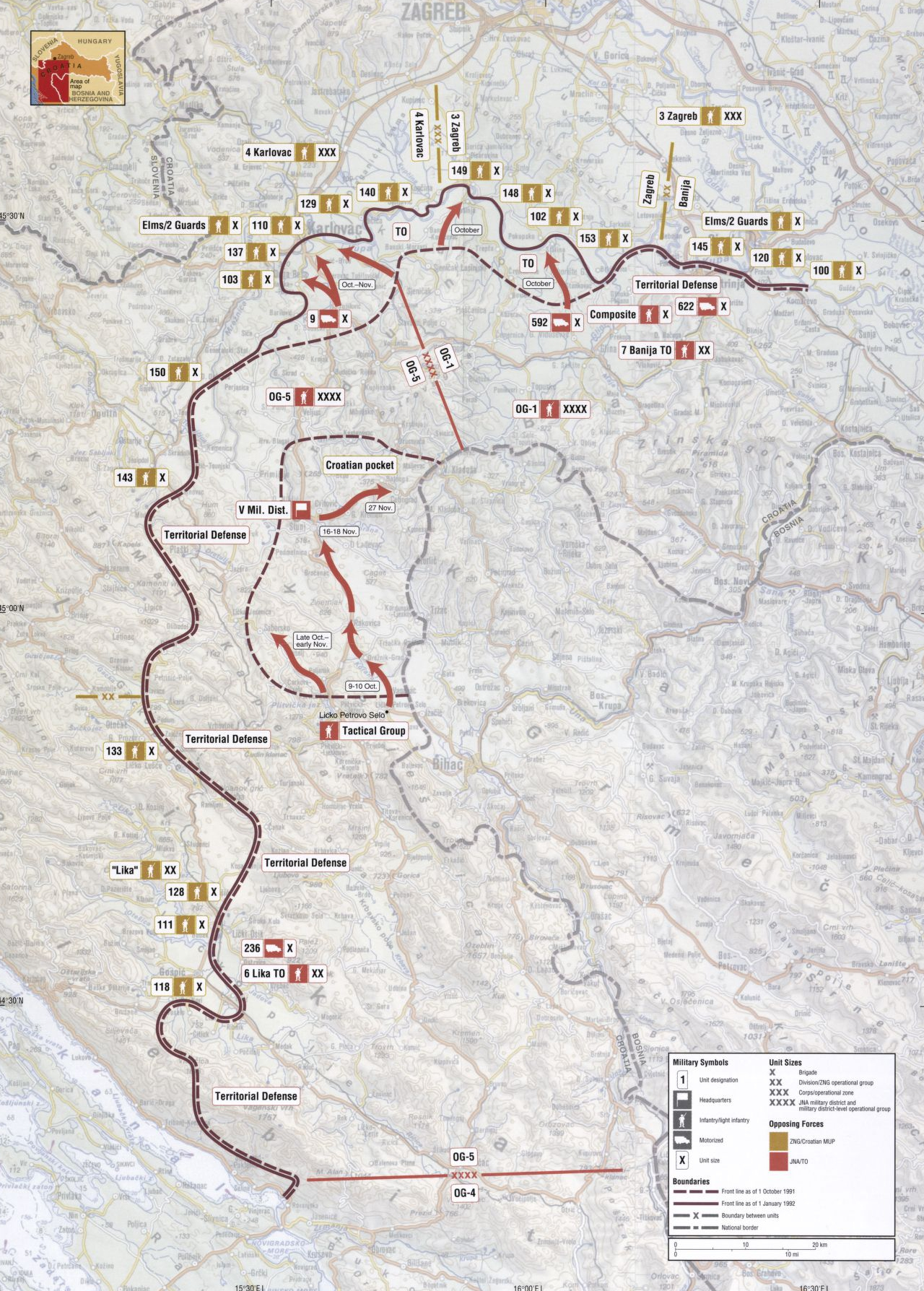
Map showing the fighting in the Banovina, Kordun and Lika regions, October 1991–January 1992; Slunj pocket is shown in the centre of the map

In 1990, following the electoral defeat of the government of the Socialist Republic of Croatia, ethnic tensions between Croats and Serbs worsened. The Yugoslav People's Army (Jugoslovenska Narodna Armija – JNA) confiscated Croatia's Territorial Defence (Teritorijalna obrana - TO) weapons to minimize resistance. On 17 August, the tensions escalated into an open revolt by Croatian Serbs, centred on the predominantly Serb-populated areas of the Dalmatian hinterland around Knin, parts of the Lika, Kordun, Banovina and eastern Croatia. This was followed by two unsuccessful attempts by Serbia, supported by Montenegro and Serbia's provinces of Vojvodina and Kosovo to obtain the Yugoslav Presidency's approval for a JNA operation to disarm Croatian security forces in January 1991.

After a bloodless skirmish between Serb insurgents and Croatian special police in March, the JNA itself, supported by Serbia and its allies, asked the Federal Presidency to give it wartime authority and declare a state of emergency. The request was denied on 15 March, and the JNA came under the control of Serbian President Slobodan Milošević. Milošević publicly threatened to replace the JNA with a Serbian army and declared that he no longer recognized the authority of the Federal Presidency. By the end of the month, the conflict had escalated into the Croatian War of Independence. The JNA stepped in, increasingly supporting the Croatian Serb insurgents, and preventing Croatian police from intervening. In early April, the leaders of the Croatian Serb revolt declared their intention to integrate the area under their control, known as SAO Krajina, with Serbia. The Government of Croatia viewed this declaration as an attempt to secede.

In May, the Croatian government responded by forming the Croatian National Guard (Zbor narodne garde - ZNG), but its development was hampered by a United Nations (UN) arms embargo introduced in September. On 8 October, Croatia declared independence from Yugoslavia, and a month later the ZNG was renamed the Croatian Army (Hrvatska vojska - HV). Late 1991 saw the fiercest fighting of the war, as the Yugoslav campaign in Croatia culminated in the Siege of Dubrovnik, and the Battle of Vukovar.

== Prelude ==
The Saborsko Independent Company, consisting of approximately 30 personnel, was stationed in the village by the Croatian police the day after the Plitvice Lakes incident on 1 April 1991. The tensions worsened in July. That month the JNA distributed 1,000 small arms to ethnic Serbs living in Gorski kotar region, including Plaški. Skirmishes took place near Josipdol and Plaški. In June–August, Saborsko was targeted by artillery and mortars positioned at JNA barracks in Lička Jasenica, and the bulk of its civilian population fled by early August. However, approximately 400 returned to their homes the same month after 20–30 special police troops were deployed from Duga Resa to Saborsko along with 15–20 regular police drawn from Slunj as reinforcements. On 25 September, 100–200 police reservists arrived to Saborsko from Zagreb. The final Croatian reinforcements arrived in October, consisting of 20–50 police. By October, a pocket of Croatian-controlled territory formed around the town of Slunj south of Karlovac, on the boundary of the regions of Kordun and Lika, hampering direct communications between SAO Krajina-held areas in the two regions. The pocket was separated from the bulk of the Croatian Government-controlled territory by the SAO Krajina-controlled town of Plaški to the west. In turn, Plaški was inaccessible to the central SAO Krajina authorities as the road to Plaški ran through the village of Saborsko, situated within the Slunj pocket.

In early October, the JNA and the SAO Krajina TO launched a joint offensive which was aimed at capturing the peripheral areas of the Slunj pocket. The JNA also planned to airlift 44 truckloads of weapons from Željava Air Base to Gorski kotar and raise a combat brigade there in support of the operation and to extend their control into Gorski kotar. The airlift was cancelled after the Yugoslav Air Force refused to follow the orders. That month, the JNA captured the village of Lipovača, 25 kilometres (16 miles) east of Saborsko, and turned it over to Serb paramilitaries. Most of the Croat civilians fled, although at least seven civilians were killed and the village looted and torched. Three more Croat civilians were killed in the nearby village of Vukovići. The Croatian police and the ZNG, including the forces based in Saborsko, launched a failed attempt to capture the JNA base in Lička Jasenica on 4–8 November resulting in the deaths of a number of Serb civilians. During an attack on the 7 November, a force commanded by JNA officers and including the 63rd Parachute Battalion troops killed ten more Croat civilians in a massacre in the villages of Poljanak and Vukovići, near Saborsko on 7 November.

== Timeline ==
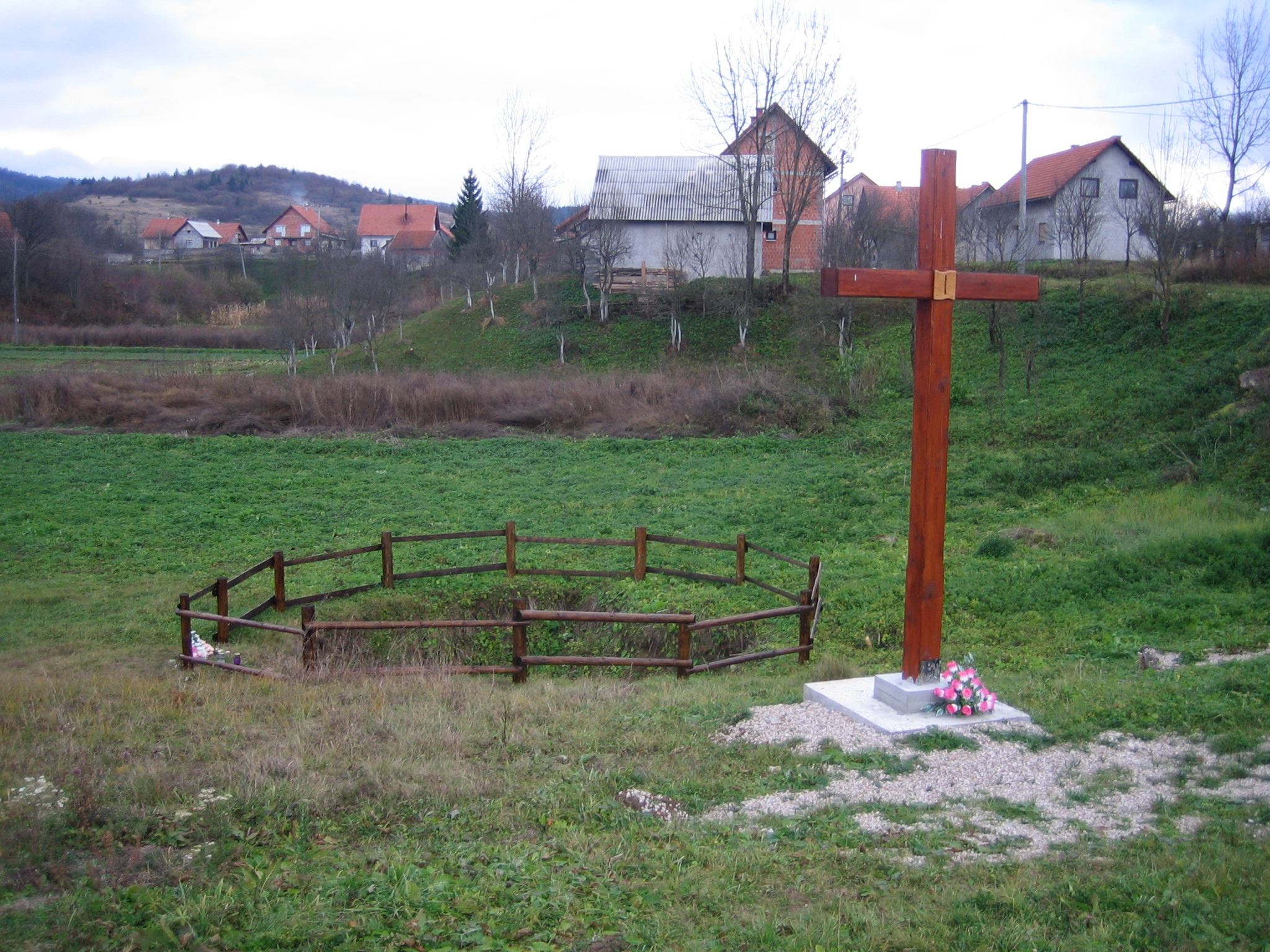
A mass grave site in Saborsko

In early November, the JNA and the SAO Krajina TO intensified their offensive aimed at capturing Saborsko and the Slunj pocket. The main axes of the advance radiated north and northwest from the Plitvice Lakes—towards Slunj and Saborsko respectively. The JNA force assigned to the offensive was organised as the Tactical Group 2 (TG-2), under the command of Colonel Čedomir Bulat. The TG-2, whose bulk consisted of a reinforced motorised battalion detached from the 236th Motorised Brigade and a D-30 howitzer battalion, was supported by the 5th Partisan Brigade, both subordinated to the 13th JNA Corps as well as a police unit and a SAO Krajina TO brigade drawn from Plaški. The attacking force, supported by the Yugoslav Air Force, artillery and tanks, approached the village from three directions on the morning of 12 November, while the main force advancing towards Slunj reached Rakovica. According to SAO Krajina sources, the air strikes commenced at 9 a.m. and lasted for fifteen minutes. They were followed by a 30-minute artillery bombardment before ground forces were ordered to attack.

The defences of Saborsko were first breached at noon, and the attacking force reached the centre of the village at 3:30 p.m. According to SAO Krajina sources, resistance was light, with the defending force estimated to consist of only 150 armed troops. The village was secured by 5 p.m. with tanks attached to the attacking force withdrawn by 6 p.m. The assault resulted in the death of 50 Croatian troops, while the attacking forces suffered only four wounded. In the immediate aftermath of the fighting to control Saborsko, the village was looted and many houses were torched.

After the attack, the bulk of the civilian population and the remaining Croatian police and troops fled over snow-covered terrain in poor weather to Karlovac, Ogulin, and to the nearby territory of Bosnia and Herzegovina. Approximately 30–60 civilians, largely elderly people, remained in Saborsko. The JNA and SAO Krajina troops forced those who remained behind to leave the village, killing or abusing the civilians. Between 25 and 32 civilians were murdered by the troops in the immediate aftermath of the capture of Saborsko. Some of the victims were shot, while others were beaten, burned to death, hung or killed with chainsaws.

== Aftermath ==
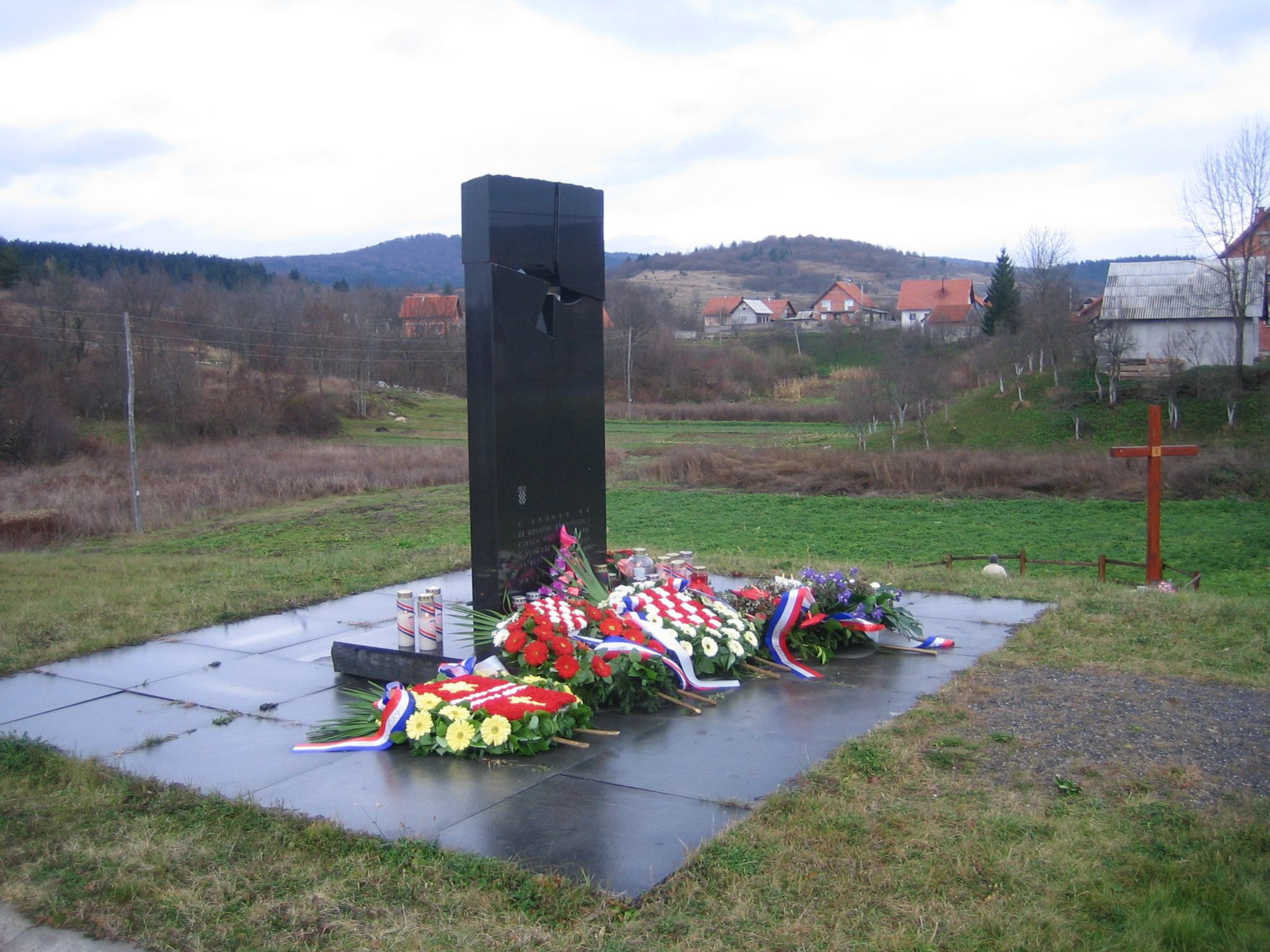
A monument to the civilian victims in Saborsko

The destruction of Saborsko continued and both churches in the village were demolished by mid-December. By 1995, the entire village had been completely destroyed except for two Serb-owned houses, which were badly damaged. After its capture, the village was renamed Ravna Gora by the SAO Krajina authorities. Croatian forces subsequently lost control of Slunj on 16 November 1991 and the rest of the pocket fell to the TG-2 when it captured Cetingrad on 29 November. The Saborsko Independent Company, which unsuccessfully defended Saborsko, was subsequently attached to Ogulin Home Guard Battalion, which was in turn amalgamated with other HV units to form the 143rd Home Guard Regiment.

In the two months following the recapture of the area by Croatia in 1995 during Operation Storm, the bodies of 27 victims were recovered in two mass graves containing three and fourteen bodies respectively, and in ten individual graves. In its indictment of Milan Babić, leader of the SAO Krajina at the time when the killings in Saborsko took place, the International Criminal Tribunal for the former Yugoslavia (ICTY) specified that 29 Croat civilians were killed in Saborsko on 12 November 1991.

The killings in the Slunj pocket, including those in Saborsko, were prosecuted by the ICTY. The ICTY charged Babić and Milan Martić, respectively the defence and interior ministers of the SAO Krajina. In the trial of Milan Martić, the ICTY found Martić guilty of persecution on racial, ethnic, or religious grounds; murder; deportation or forcible transfer; plunder; and wanton destruction or devastation not justified by military necessity. He was sentenced to 35-year sentence, which included other crimes across Croatia. His involvement in the killings, among other charges brought forward by the ICTY, was interpreted by the tribunal as part of a campaign of ethnic cleansing of non-Serbs from SAO Krajina controlled areas. Babić pleaded guilty to persecutions at the ICTY and was sentenced to 13 years in prison.

Saborsko was rebuilt after the war with a total of 400 houses constructed, but the refugees returning to the village were mostly elderly due to a lack of employment options elsewhere. The site of one of the mass graves in Saborsko is marked with a monument to the victims. Three different commemorative plaques dedicated to Croatian policemen and troops killed in Saborsko in 1991 were placed at various sites in the village in 2009, but two were stolen on 11 November 2010. The missing commemorative plaques were replaced by November 2011.
