= Gaćište =

- Location within Croatia
- Coordinates: 45°50′N 17°36′E
- Country: Croatia
- County: Virovitica-Podravina
- Municipality: Suhopolje

Area
  - Total: 11.0 km^{2} (4.2 sq mi)

Population (2021)
  - Total: 143
  - Density: 13.0/km^{2} (33.7/sq mi)
- Time zone: UTC+1 (CET)
  - Summer (DST): UTC+2 (CEST)

Gaćište is a village in the municipality Suhopolje. Jasik and Pustara are two smaller villages also considered to belong to Gaćište. Gaćište’s economy is largely based on agriculture, with important foundations such as; school (built in 1910 years, open until 1989), farm for breeding cattle, old agricultural warehouses, big village lodge set as center of culture, small park and church of “Mala Gospa” (Small Virgin Mary).

== Population ==
According to the census of 2001, the village had 280 inhabitants (132 men and 148 women). After the Croatian War of Independence between 1991 and 1995, Gaćište experienced a large demographic decline. Predominantly Serb population emigrated from Croatia and was replaced by immigrants from Bosnia and Vojvodina.

The village was a colonist settlement established during the land reform in interwar Yugoslavia.

== Culture ==
The village is surrounded by archaeological sites. On the way to the village Zvonimirovo are the remains of ‘whitehill’ and ‘latenic culture’ (23 skeleton tombs dated from AD 1000 to 1080). Also there are many of Roman artifacts around as the village is located near the ancient Roman settlement Bolentio (today village Orešac ).
