= Suhopolje =

- Municipality
- Location of Suhopolje in Croatia
- Coordinates: 45°48′N 17°30′E
- Country: Croatia
- County: Virovitica-Podravina County

Area
  - Municipality: 166.6 km^{2} (64.3 sq mi)
  - Urban: 29.7 km^{2} (11.5 sq mi)

Population (2021)
  - Municipality: 5,267
  - Density: 31.61/km^{2} (81.88/sq mi)
  - Urban: 2,237
  - Urban density: 75.3/km^{2} (195/sq mi)
- Website: suhopolje.hr

Suhopolje is a settlement and an eponymous municipality in Slavonia, Croatia.

It is located on the northern slopes of the Bilogora mountain in the region of Podravina, 10 km southeast of Virovitica; elevation 118 m.

== Population ==
In the 2011 census, the total population of the Suhopolje municipality was 6,683, with 2,696 people in Suhopolje itself and the rest in a number of surrounding villages:

- Borova, population 710
- Budanica, population 107
- Cabuna, population 787
- Dvorska, population 15
- Gaćište, population 221
- Gvozdanska, population 34
- Jugovo Polje, population 319
- Levinovac, population 188
- Mala Trapinska, population 62
- Naudovac, population 146
- Orešac, population 389
- Pčelić, population 407
- Pepelana, population 116
- Pivnica Slavonska, population 53
- Rodin Potok, population 56
- Sovjak, population 13
- Trnava Cabunska, population 42
- Velika Trapinska, population 25
- Zvonimirovo, population 112
- Žiroslavlje, population 74
- Žubrica, population 111

Colonist settlements of Nova Cabuna, Gaćište (Kačište), Novo Obilićevo, and Žirostanj were established on the territory of the municipality of Cabuna and colonies of Čemernica, Međugorje, Ovčara, Pepelana, and Suhopolje in the territory of the town municipality during the land reform in interwar Yugoslavia.

== Politics ==
=== Minority councils ===
Directly elected minority councils and representatives are tasked with consulting tasks for the local or regional authorities in which they are advocating for minority rights and interests, integration into public life and participation in the management of local affairs. At the 2023 Croatian national minorities councils and representatives elections Serbs of Croatia fulfilled legal requirements to elect 10 members minority councils of the Municipality of Suhopolje.

== Literature ==
- Obad Šćitaroci, Mladen; Bojanić Obad Šćitaroci, Bojana; Dundović, Boris (2013). "Manors and Gardens in Northern Croatia in the Age of Historicism" (PDF). Centropa. pp. 175–186. ISSN 1532-5563. Archived from the original (PDF) on 2025-05-05.
