= Golo Brdo =

Golo Brdo may refer to:

- Golo Brdo, Bijeljina, a village near Bijeljina, Bosnia and Herzegovina
- Golo Brdo (Bugojno), a village near Bugojno, Bosnia and Herzegovina
- Golo Brdo, Brda, a village in Slovenia
- Golo Brdo, Medvode, a village in Slovenia
- Golo Brdo, Kneževo, a village near Kneževo, Bosnia and Herzegovina
- Golo Brdo, Virovitica-Podravina County, a village near Virovitica
- Golo Brdo, Požega-Slavonia County, a village near Kaptol
- Golloborda, a region of Albania
