= Bijeljevina Orahovička =

- Location of Bijeljevina Orahovička within Croatia
- Coordinates: 45°34′N 17°54′E
- Country: Croatia
- County: Virovitica-Podravina County

Area
  - Total: 5.5 km^{2} (2.1 sq mi)
- Elevation: 0 m (0 ft)

Population (2021)
  - Total: 11
  - Density: 2.0/km^{2} (5.2/sq mi)
- Time zone: UTC+1 (CET)
  - Summer (DST): UTC+2 (CEST)
- Postal code: 33515 Orahovica
- Area code: 033

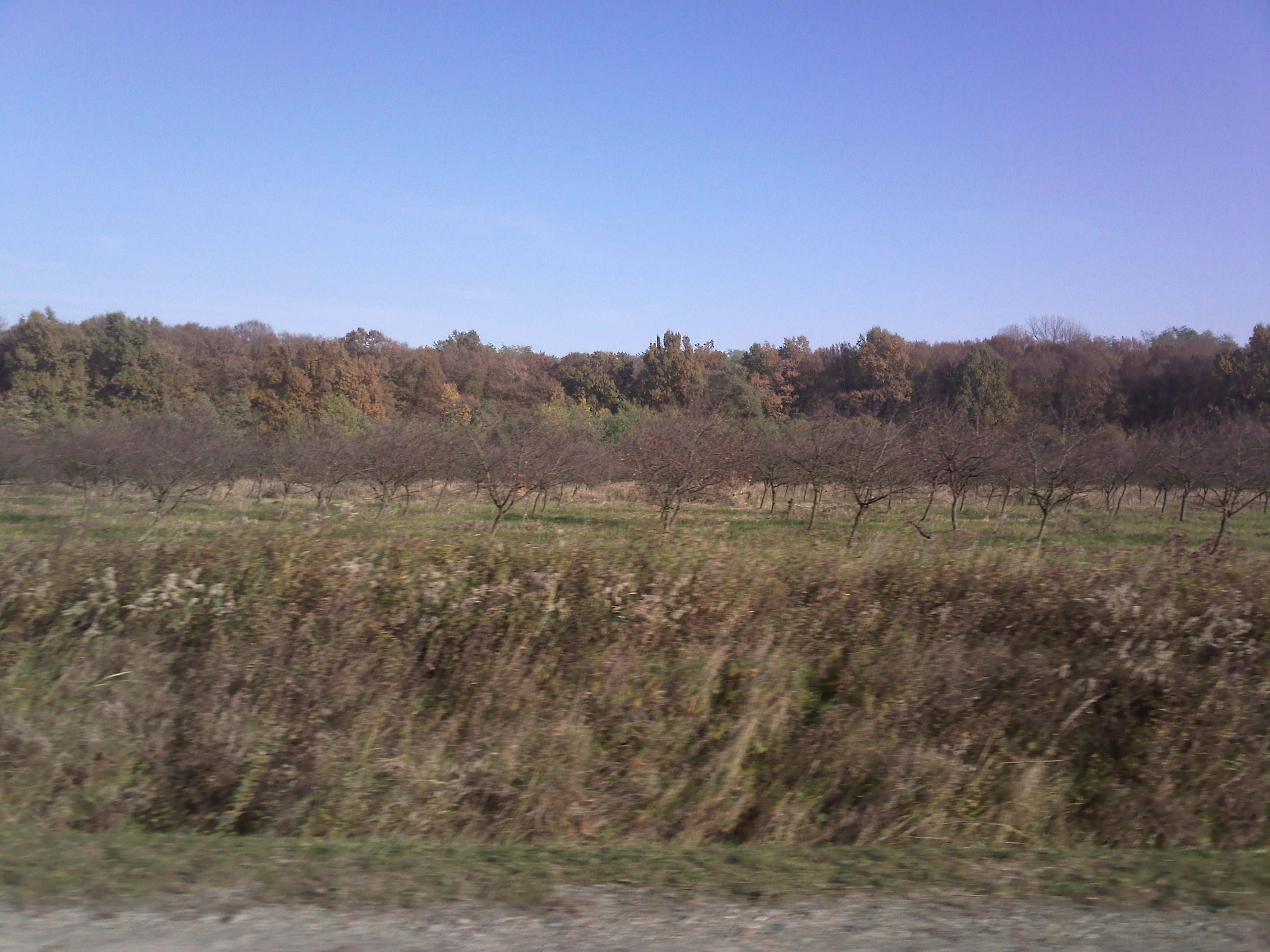
Panoramic view of the village

Bijeljevina Orahovička is a village in north-eastern Slavonia, situated in municipality town of Orahovica, Virovitica-Podravina County, Croatia.

== Population ==
Bijeljevina Orahovička
year of census	2001	1991	1981	1971	1961
Croats	23 (63.88%)	18 (41.86%)	74 (48.36%)	91 (80.53%)	126 (90.64%)
Serbs	7 (19.44%)	8 (18.60%)	30 (19.60%)	5 (4.42%)	7 (5.03%)
Yugoslavs	0	7 (16.27%)	46 (30.06%)	0	0
others and unknown	6 (16.66%)	10 (23.25%)	3 (1.96%)	17 (15.04%)	6 (4.31%)
total	36	43	153	113	139

In 1991 census, parts of Bijeljevina Orahovička settlement are separated, and became parts of settlements Čačinci and Duga Međa.
