= Rezovac =

Coordinates: 45°48′19″N 17°24′43″E

- Village
- Interactive map of Rezovac
- Country: Croatia
- County: Virovitica-Podravina County
- Town: Virovitica

Area
  - Total: 9.0 km^{2} (3.5 sq mi)

Population (2021)
  - Total: 1,146
  - Density: 130/km^{2} (330/sq mi)
- Time zone: UTC+1 (CET)
  - Summer (DST): UTC+2 (CEST)
- Postal code: 33 000
- Area code: +385 (0) 33
- Vehicle registration: VT

Rezovac is a village in Croatia.
