= Kokočak =

- Location of Kokočak within Croatia
- Coordinates: 45°32′N 17°49′E
- Country: Croatia
- County: Virovitica-Podravina County

Area
  - Total: 14.5 km^{2} (5.6 sq mi)
- Elevation: 0 m (0 ft)

Population (2021)
  - Total: 8
  - Density: 0.55/km^{2} (1.4/sq mi)
- Time zone: UTC+1 (CET)
  - Summer (DST): UTC+2 (CEST)
- Postal code: 33515 Orahovica
- Area code: 033

Kokočak is a village in north-eastern Slavonia, situated in municipality town of Orahovica, Virovitica-Podravina county, Croatia.

== Population ==
Kokočak
year of census	2001.	1991.	1981.	1971.	1961.
Serbs	9 (64,28%)	77 (91,66%)	82 (73,87%)	124 (96,12%)	175 (99,43%)
Croats	0	5 (5,95%)	3 (2,70%)	1 (0,77%)	1 (0,56%)
Yugoslavs	0	1 (1,19%)	26 (23,42%)	0	0
others and unknown	5 (35,71%)	1 (1,19%)	0	4 (3,10%)	0
total	14	84	111	129	176
