= Šumeđe =

- Location of Šumeđe within Croatia
- Coordinates: 45°30′N 17°56′E
- Country: Croatia
- County: Virovitica-Podravina County

Area
  - Total: 4.0 km^{2} (1.5 sq mi)
- Elevation: 0 m (0 ft)

Population (2021)
  - Total: 26
  - Density: 6.5/km^{2} (17/sq mi)
- Time zone: UTC+1 (CET)
  - Summer (DST): UTC+2 (CEST)
- Postal code: 33515 Orahovica
- Area code: 033

Šumeđe is a village in north-eastern Slavonia, situated in municipality town of Orahovica, Virovitica-Podravina County, Croatia.

== Population ==
Šumeđe
year of census	2001	1991	1981	1971	1961
Croats	30 (65.21%)	5 (7.81%)	5 (7.14%)	10 (14.08%)	5 (6.66%)
Serbs	9 (19.56%)	51 (79.68%)	51 (72.85%)	61 (85.91%)	70 (93.33%)
Yugoslavs	0	0	13 (18.57%)	0	0
others and unknown	7 (15.21%)	8 (12.50%)	1 (1.42%)	0	0
total	46	64	70	71	75
