= Duzluk =

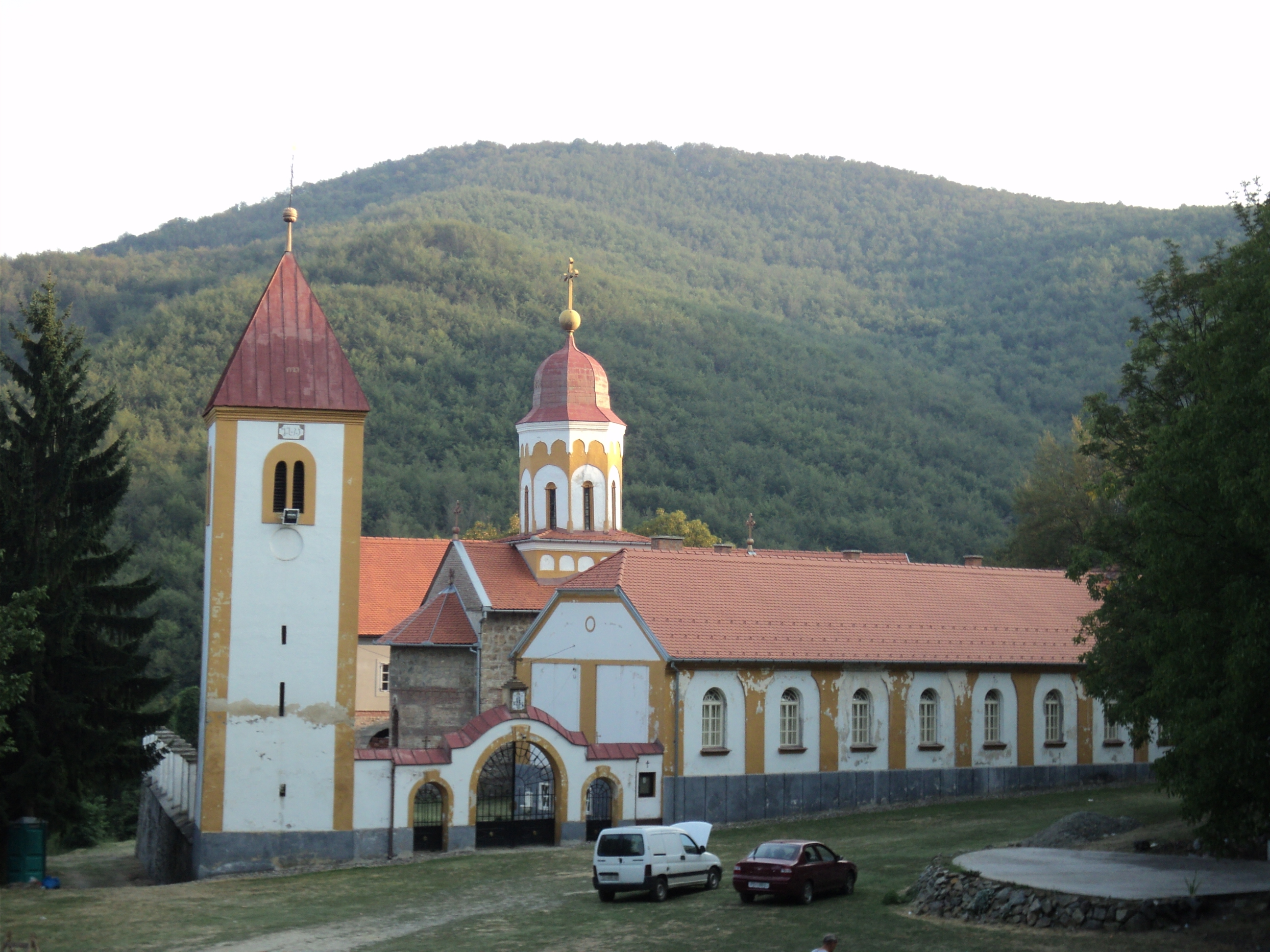
- Orahovica Monastery

- Location of Duzluk within Croatia
- Coordinates: 45°31′N 17°53′E
- Country: Croatia
- County: Virovitica-Podravina County

Area
  - Total: 20.9 km^{2} (8.1 sq mi)
- Elevation: 259 m (850 ft)

Population (2021)
  - Total: 136
  - Density: 6.51/km^{2} (16.9/sq mi)
- Time zone: UTC+1 (CET)
  - Summer (DST): UTC+2 (CEST)
- Postal code: 33515 Orahovica
- Area code: 033

Duzluk is a village in north-eastern Slavonia, administratively located in the Town of Orahovica, Virovitica-Podravina county, Croatia.

== Population ==
Duzluk
year of census	2001	1991	1981	1971	1961
Croats	136 (67.66%)	62 (25.61%)	38 (15.76%)	49 (20.24%)	56 (19.17%)
Serbs	58 (28.85%)	147 (60.74%)	134 (55.60%)	183 (75.61%)	232 (79.45%)
Yugoslavs	0	11 (4.54%)	62 (25.72%)	0	0
others and unknown	7 (3.48%)	22 (9.09%)	7 (2.90%)	10 (4.13%)	4 (1.36%)
total	201	242	241	242	292
