= Jugovo Polje =

Coordinates: 45°46′44″N 17°34′12″E

- Village
- Interactive map of Jugovo Polje
- Country: Croatia
- County: Virovitica-Podravina County
- Municipality: Suhopolje

Area
  - Total: 5.4 km^{2} (2.1 sq mi)

Population (2021)
  - Total: 267
  - Density: 49/km^{2} (130/sq mi)
- Time zone: UTC+1 (CET)
  - Summer (DST): UTC+2 (CEST)

Jugovo Polje is a village in Croatia. It is connected by the D2 highway.
