= Pepelana =

Coordinates: 45°45′N 17°29′E

- Village
- Interactive map of Pepelana
- Country: Croatia
- County: Virovitica-Podravina County
- Municipality: Suhopolje

Area
  - Total: 5.0 km^{2} (1.9 sq mi)

Population (2021)
  - Total: 90
  - Density: 18/km^{2} (47/sq mi)
- Time zone: UTC+1 (CET)
  - Summer (DST): UTC+2 (CEST)

Pepelana is a village in Croatia. It is connected by the D34 highway.
