= Crkvari =

- Location of Crkvari within Croatia
- Coordinates: 45°31′N 17°58′E
- Country: Croatia
- County: Virovitica-Podravina County

Area
  - Total: 4.0 km^{2} (1.5 sq mi)
- Elevation: 0 m (0 ft)

Population (2021)
  - Total: 112
  - Density: 28/km^{2} (73/sq mi)
- Time zone: UTC+1 (CET)
  - Summer (DST): UTC+2 (CEST)
- Postal code: 33515 Orahovica
- Area code: 033

Crkvari is a village in north-eastern Slavonia, situated in municipality town of Orahovica, Virovitica-Podravina County, Croatia.

== Population ==
Crkvari
year of census	2001.	1991.	1981.	1971.	1961.
Croats	139 (99,28%)	140 (95,89%)	155 (93,93%)	188 (95,91%)	208 (98,57%)
Serbs	0	1 (0,68%)	0	0	2 (0,94%)
Yugoslavs	0	0	10 (6,06%)	8 (4,08%)	0
others and unknown	1 (0,71%)	5 (3,42%)	0	0	1 (0,47%)
total	140	146	165	196	211
