= Donja Pištana =

- Location of Donja Pištana within Croatia
- Coordinates: 45°31′N 17°50′E
- Country: Croatia
- County: Virovitica-Podravina County

Area
  - Total: 6.8 km^{2} (2.6 sq mi)
- Elevation: 0 m (0 ft)

Population (2021)
  - Total: 207
  - Density: 30/km^{2} (79/sq mi)
- Time zone: UTC+1 (CET)
  - Summer (DST): UTC+2 (CEST)
- Postal code: 33515 Orahovica
- Area code: 033

Donja Pištana is a village in north-eastern Slavonia, situated in municipality town of Orahovica, Virovitica-Podravina County, Croatia.

== Population ==
Donja Pištana
year of census	2001.	1991.	1981.	1971.	1961.
Croats	183 (66,06%)	138 (40,23%)	138 (37,50%)	221 (52,74%)	224 (46,76%)
Serbs	39 (14,07%)	125 (36,44%)	92 (25,00%)	144 (34,36%)	246 (51,35%)
Yugoslavs	0	50 (14,57%)	119 (32,33%)	35 (8,35%)	7 (1,46%)
others and unknown	55 (19,85%)	30 (8,74%)	19 (5,16%)	19 (4,53%)	2 (0,41%)
total	277	343	368	419	479
