= Rezovačke Krčevine =

Settlement in Virovitica-Podravina County, Croatia

- Settlement
- Interactive map of Rezovačke Krčevine
- Location of Rezovačke Krčevine in Croatia
- Coordinates: 45°46′54″N 17°24′8″E
- Country: Croatia
- County: Virovitica-Podravina
- City: Virovitica

Area
  - Total: 4.1 km^{2} (1.6 sq mi)

Population (2021)
  - Total: 295
  - Density: 72/km^{2} (190/sq mi)
- Time zone: UTC+1 (CET)
  - Summer (DST): UTC+2 (CEST)
- Postal code: 33000 Virovitica
- Area code: +385 (0)33

Rezovačke Krčevine is a settlement in the City of Virovitica in Croatia. In 2021, its population was 295.

== Demographics ==
Rezovačke Krčevine: Population trends 1921–2021
v

population		523	627	654	653	533	430	398	360	331	295
	1921	1931	1948	1953	1961	1971	1981	1991	2001	2011	2021

Sources: Croatian Bureau of Statistics publications
