= Milanovac, Virovitica =

Milanovac
- Village
- Location in Croatia
- Coordinates: 45°48′4.3792″N 17°23′22.182″E
- Country: Croatia
- County: Virovitica-Podravina County
- City: Virovitica

Area
  - Total: 11.0 km^{2} (4.2 sq mi)

Population (2021)
  - Total: 1,515
  - Density: 138/km^{2} (357/sq mi)
- Postal code: 33000 Virovitica
- Area code: +385 033
- Vehicle registration: VT

Milanovac is a village in the Republic of Croatia, in the city of Virovitica, Virovitica-Podravina County.

== Population ==
Population trends 1857-2001.
v

| population | | | | | | | | | 811 | 901 | 978 | 1285 | 1238 | 1612 | 1654 |
| | 1857 | 1869 | 1880 | 1890 | 1900 | 1910 | 1921 | 1931 | 1948 | 1953 | 1961 | 1971 | 1981 | 1991 | 2001 |

Sources: Croatian Bureau of Statistics publications
