= Gornja Pištana =

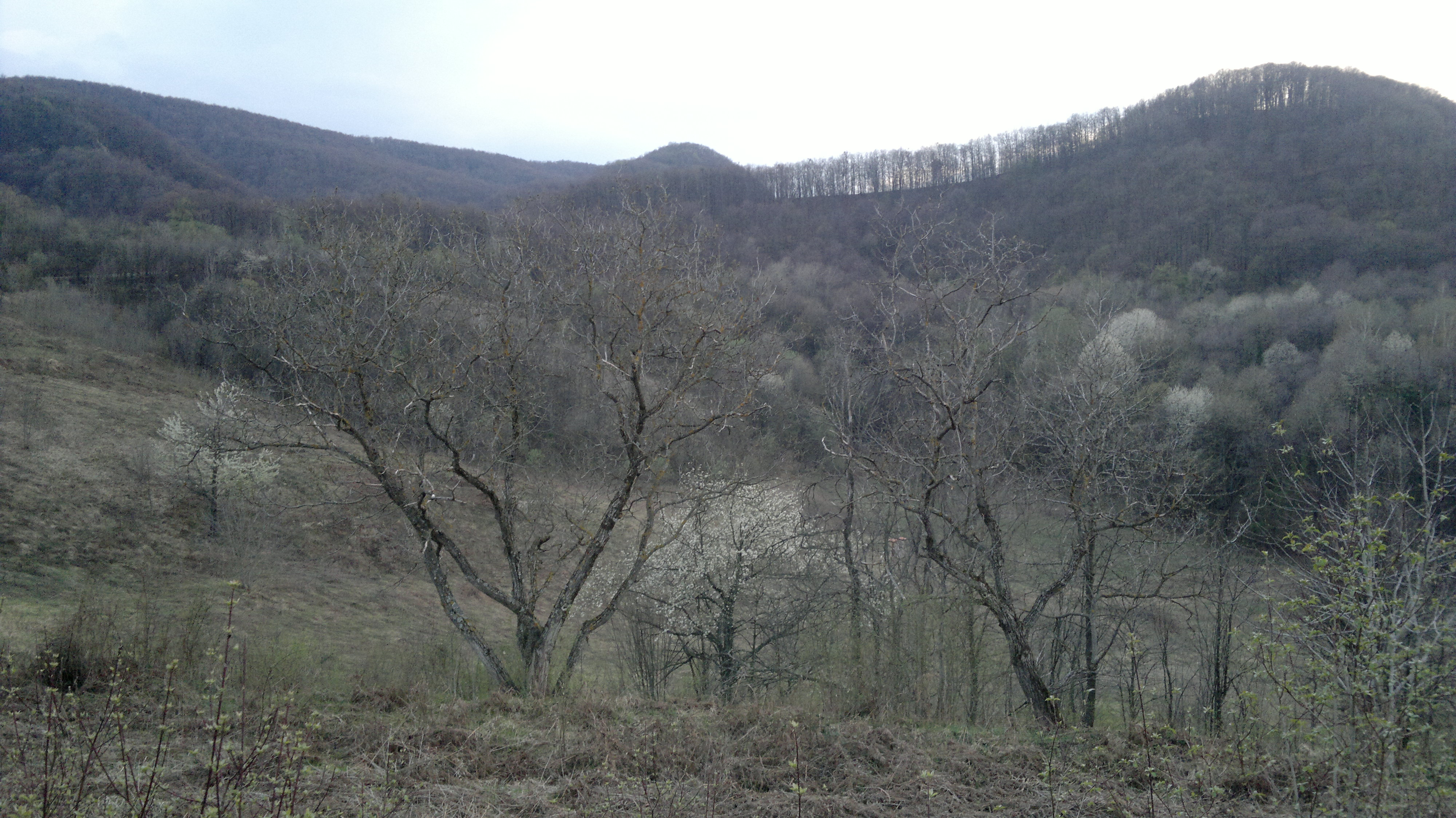
- Gornja Pištana panorama

- Location of Gornja Pištana within Croatia
- Coordinates: 45°32′N 17°50′E
- Country: Croatia
- County: Virovitica-Podravina County

Area
  - Total: 18.0 km^{2} (6.9 sq mi)

Population (2021)
  - Total: 7
  - Density: 0.39/km^{2} (1.0/sq mi)
- Time zone: UTC+1 (CET)
  - Summer (DST): UTC+2 (CEST)
- Postal code: 33515 Orahovica
- Area code: 033

Gornja Pištana is a village in north-eastern Slavonia, situated in municipality town of Orahovica, Virovitica-Podravina County, Croatia.

== Population ==
Gornja Pištana
year of census	2001	1991	1981	1971	1961
Serbs	8 (61.53%)	108 (90.00%)	77 (54.60%)	162 (92.57%)	172 (98.85%)
Croats	4 (30.76%)	5 (4.16%)	5 (3.54%)	7 (4.00%)	2 (1.14%)
Yugoslavs	0	4 (3.33%)	58 (41.13%)	3 (1.71%)	0
others and unknown	1 (7.69%)	3 (2.50%)	1 (0.70%)	3 (1.71%)	0
total	13	120	141	175	174
