= Magadinovac =

- Location of Magadinovac within Croatia
- Coordinates: 45°31′N 17°55′E
- Country: Croatia
- County: Virovitica-Podravina County

Area
  - Total: 1.9 km^{2} (0.73 sq mi)
- Elevation: 0 m (0 ft)

Population (2021)
  - Total: 9
  - Density: 4.7/km^{2} (12/sq mi)
- Time zone: UTC+1 (CET)
  - Summer (DST): UTC+2 (CEST)
- Postal code: 33515 Orahovica
- Area code: 033

Magadinovac is a village in north-eastern Slavonia, situated in municipality town of Orahovica, Virovitica-Podravina County, Croatia.

== Population ==
Magadinovac
year of census	2001.	1991.	1981.	1971.	1961.
Croats	11 (100%)	9 (100%)	9 (100%)	18 (100%)	29 (100%)
Serbs	0	0	0	0	0
Yugoslavs	0	0	0	0	0
others and unknown	0	0	0	0	0
total	11	9	9	18	29
