= Cabuna =

Coordinates: 45°45′N 17°35′E

- Village
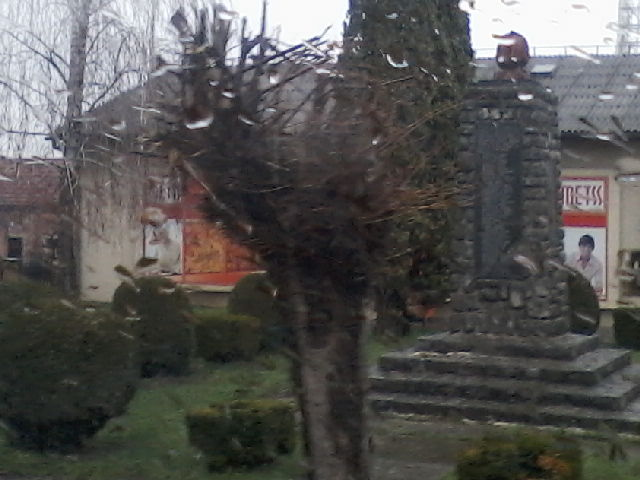
- Cabuna center
- Interactive map of Cabuna
- Country: Croatia
- County: Virovitica-Podravina County
- Municipality: Suhopolje

Area
  - Total: 16.5 km^{2} (6.4 sq mi)

Population (2021)
  - Total: 606
  - Density: 36.7/km^{2} (95.1/sq mi)
- Time zone: UTC+1 (CET)
  - Summer (DST): UTC+2 (CEST)

Cabuna is a village in Croatia. It is connected by the D2 highway.

Colonist settlements of Nova Cabuna, Gaćište (Kačište), Novo Obilićevo, and Žirostanj were established on the territory of the municipality of the village during the land reform in interwar Yugoslavia.

== History ==
In 1874, count Laislav Janković erected a manor in Cabuna for his youngest son Aladar.
