= Ladislav (disambiguation) =

Ladislav is a given name.

Ladislav may also refer to:

- Ladislav, Bjelovar-Bilogora County
- Ladislav, Virovitica-Podravina County, historical name of Zvonimirovo
