= Sveti Đurađ, Virovitica-Podravina County =

Settlement in Virovitica-Podravina County, Croatia

Sveti Đurađ
- Settlement
- Interactive map of Sveti Đurađ
- Location of Sveti Đurađ in Croatia
- Coordinates: 45°48′59″N 17°21′27″E
- Country: Croatia
- County: Virovitica-Podravina
- City: Virovitica

Area
  - Total: 39.0 km^{2} (15.1 sq mi)

Population (2021)
  - Total: 474
  - Density: 12.2/km^{2} (31.5/sq mi)
- Time zone: UTC+1 (CET)
  - Summer (DST): UTC+2 (CEST)
- Postal code: 33000 Virovitica
- Area code: +385 (0)33

Sveti Đurađ is a settlement in the City of Virovitica in Croatia. In 2021, its population was 474.

== Demographics ==
Sveti Đurađ: Population trends 1857–2021
v

population				97	344	503		782	657	731	715	645	629	638	610	564	474
	1857	1869	1880	1890	1900	1910	1921	1931	1948	1953	1961	1971	1981	1991	2001	2011	2021

Sources: Croatian Bureau of Statistics publications
