= Stara Jošava =

Village in Slavonia, Croatia

- Location of Stara Jošava within Croatia
- Coordinates: 45°32′N 17°57′E
- Country: Croatia
- County: Virovitica-Podravina County

Area
  - Total: 1.5 km^{2} (0.58 sq mi)
- Elevation: 0 m (0 ft)

Population (2021)
  - Total: 237
  - Density: 160/km^{2} (410/sq mi)
- Time zone: UTC+1 (CET)
  - Summer (DST): UTC+2 (CEST)
- Postal code: 33515 Orahovica
- Area code: 033

Stara Jošava is a village in north-eastern Slavonia, situated in municipality town of Orahovica, Virovitica-Podravina County, Croatia.

== Population ==
Stara Jošava
year of census	2001	1991	1981	1971	1961
Croats	241 (97.96%)	266 (91.40%)	263 (94.94%)	275 (98.92%)	261 (88.77%)
Serbs	0	4 (1.37%)	2 (0.72%)	2 (0.71%)	2 (0.68%)
Yugoslavs	0	0	9 (3.24%)	0	0
others and unknown	5 (2.03%)	21 (7.21%)	3 (1.08%)	1 (0.35%)	31 (10.54%)
total	246	291	277	278	294

In the 1981 census, one uninhabited part of Stara Jošava settlement was separated, and became part of settlement Feričanci.
