= Dolci, Croatia =

Dolci
- Location of Dolci within Croatia
- Coordinates: 45°33′N 17°56′E
- Country: Croatia
- County: Virovitica-Podravina County

Area
  - Total: 5.5 km^{2} (2.1 sq mi)
- Elevation: 0 m (0 ft)

Population (2021)
  - Total: 239
  - Density: 43/km^{2} (110/sq mi)
- Time zone: UTC+1 (CET)
  - Summer (DST): UTC+2 (CEST)
- Postal code: 33515 Orahovica
- Area code: 033

Dolci is a village in north-eastern Slavonia, situated in municipality town of Orahovica, Virovitica-Podravina County, Croatia.

== Population ==
Dolci
| year of census | 2001. | 1991. | 1981. | 1971. | 1961. |
|---|---|---|---|---|---|
| Croats | 312 (94,83%) | 319 (94,10%) | 356 (92,22%) | 385 (96,00%) | 495 (97,82%) |
| Serbs | 8 (2,43%) | 10 (2,94%) | 16 (4,14%) | 5 (1,24%) | 5 (0,98%) |
| Yugoslavs | 0 | 0 | 6 (1.55%) | 6 (1.49%) | 1 (0.19%) |
| others and unknown | 9 (2,73%) | 10 (2,94%) | 8 (2,07%) | 5 (1,24%) | 5 (0,98%) |
| total | 329 | 339 | 386 | 401 | 506 |
