= Jasenaš =

Settlement in Virovitica-Podravina County, Croatia

- Settlement
- Interactive map of Jasenaš
- Location of Jasenaš in Croatia
- Coordinates: 45°44′10″N 17°24′31″E
- Country: Croatia
- County: Virovitica-Podravina
- City: Virovitica

Area
  - Total: 39.8 km^{2} (15.4 sq mi)

Population (2021)
  - Total: 53
  - Density: 1.3/km^{2} (3.4/sq mi)
- Time zone: UTC+1 (CET)
  - Summer (DST): UTC+2 (CEST)
- Postal code: 33000 Virovitica
- Area code: +385 (0)33

Jasenaš is a settlement in the City of Virovitica in Croatia. In 2021, its population was 53.

== Demographics ==
Jasenaš: Population trends 1857–2021
v

population	435	476	501	705	817	959	1007	1094	1002	1004	848	566	320	222	117	77	53
	1857	1869	1880	1890	1900	1910	1921	1931	1948	1953	1961	1971	1981	1991	2001	2011	2021

Sources: Croatian Bureau of Statistics publications
