= Borova, Croatia =

Village in Croatia

Borova
- Village
- Interactive map of Borova
- Coordinates: 45°47′05″N 17°27′39″E
- Country: Croatia
- County: Virovitica-Podravina

Population (2011)
  - Total: 710

Borova is a village near Suhopolje, Croatia. In the 2011 census it had 710 inhabitants.
