= The Spring of Orahovica =

The Spring of Orahovica (Croatian: Orahovačko proljeće) is a cultural and tourist festival in the Virovitica-Podravina County in Slavonia, Croatia. Held annually at the beginning of June, the six-day event celebrates Orahovica, a tourist destination in the county, and officially marks the beginning of the summer tourist season.

== Flower Parade ==
The Spring of Orahovica traces its origins to the Flower Parade, an event that originated in 1957. Today, the Flower Parade is made up of a series of events that are held on the last day of the celebration, which always falls on the first Sunday of June. The procession is organized along the town’s main street. With children costumed as flowers, cultural clubs wearing folk costumes, and a brass marching band, the parade represents the historical, natural, and cultural riches of the town. After the parade, there is a folklore festival, which marks the end of the event.

== Program ==
For sports aficionados, basketball, handball, indoor-football, bowling, chess and horseback riding tournaments are held every day. The local hiking club promotes hiking and alpinism by installing an artificial mountain and a photography display. There are also exhibitions of the local painters, whose work reflects the history and culture of Orahovica. A display of needlework and dishes characteristic of this part of Croatia are also included in the exhibition. Since orchards and vineyards are an integral part of the life in Slavonia, fruit-growers and viticulturists present their products and offer a tasting in the town’s central park. Friday and Saturday evenings are reserved for the entertainment programs, such as theatrical and folklore performances, and pop and rock concerts.
