= Nova Jošava =

- Location of Nova Jošava within Croatia
- Coordinates: 45°31′N 17°56′E
- Country: Croatia
- County: Virovitica-Podravina County

Area
  - Total: 6.1 km^{2} (2.4 sq mi)
- Elevation: 0 m (0 ft)

Population (2021)
  - Total: 152
  - Density: 25/km^{2} (65/sq mi)
- Time zone: UTC+1 (CET)
  - Summer (DST): UTC+2 (CEST)
- Postal code: 33515 Orahovica
- Area code: 033

Nova Jošava is a village in north-eastern Slavonia, situated in municipality town of Orahovica, Virovitica-Podravina County, Croatia.

== Population ==
Nova Jošava
year of census	2001.	1991.	1981.	1971.	1961.
Croats	185 (96,85%)	216 (90,00%)	257 (93,45%)	323 (96,41%)	407 (98,30%)
Serbs	0	10 (4,16%)	10 (3,63%)	3 (0,89%)	0
Yugoslavs	0	6 (2,50%)	3 (1,09%)	0	0
others and unknown	6 (3,14%)	8 (3,33%)	5 (1,81%)	9 (2,68%)	7 (1,69%)
total	191	240	275	335	414
