= Podgorje, Virovitica-Podravina County =

Settlement in Virovitica-Podravina County, Croatia

Podgorje
- Settlement
- Interactive map of Podgorje
- Location of Podgorje in Croatia
- Coordinates: 45°49′29″N 17°20′52″E
- Country: Croatia
- County: Virovitica-Podravina
- City: Virovitica

Area
  - Total: 3.2 km^{2} (1.2 sq mi)

Population (2021)
  - Total: 737
  - Density: 230/km^{2} (600/sq mi)
- Time zone: UTC+1 (CET)
  - Summer (DST): UTC+2 (CEST)
- Postal code: 33000 Virovitica
- Area code: +385 (0)33

Podgorje is a settlement in the City of Virovitica in Croatia. In 2021, its population was 737.

== Demographics ==
Podgorje: Population trends 1961–2021
v

population		701	733	779	827	833	737
	1961	1971	1981	1991	2001	2011	2021

Sources: Croatian Bureau of Statistics publications
