= Orahovica Monastery =

Serbian Orthodox monastery near Orahovica, Croatia

- Манастир Ораховица (Serbian)
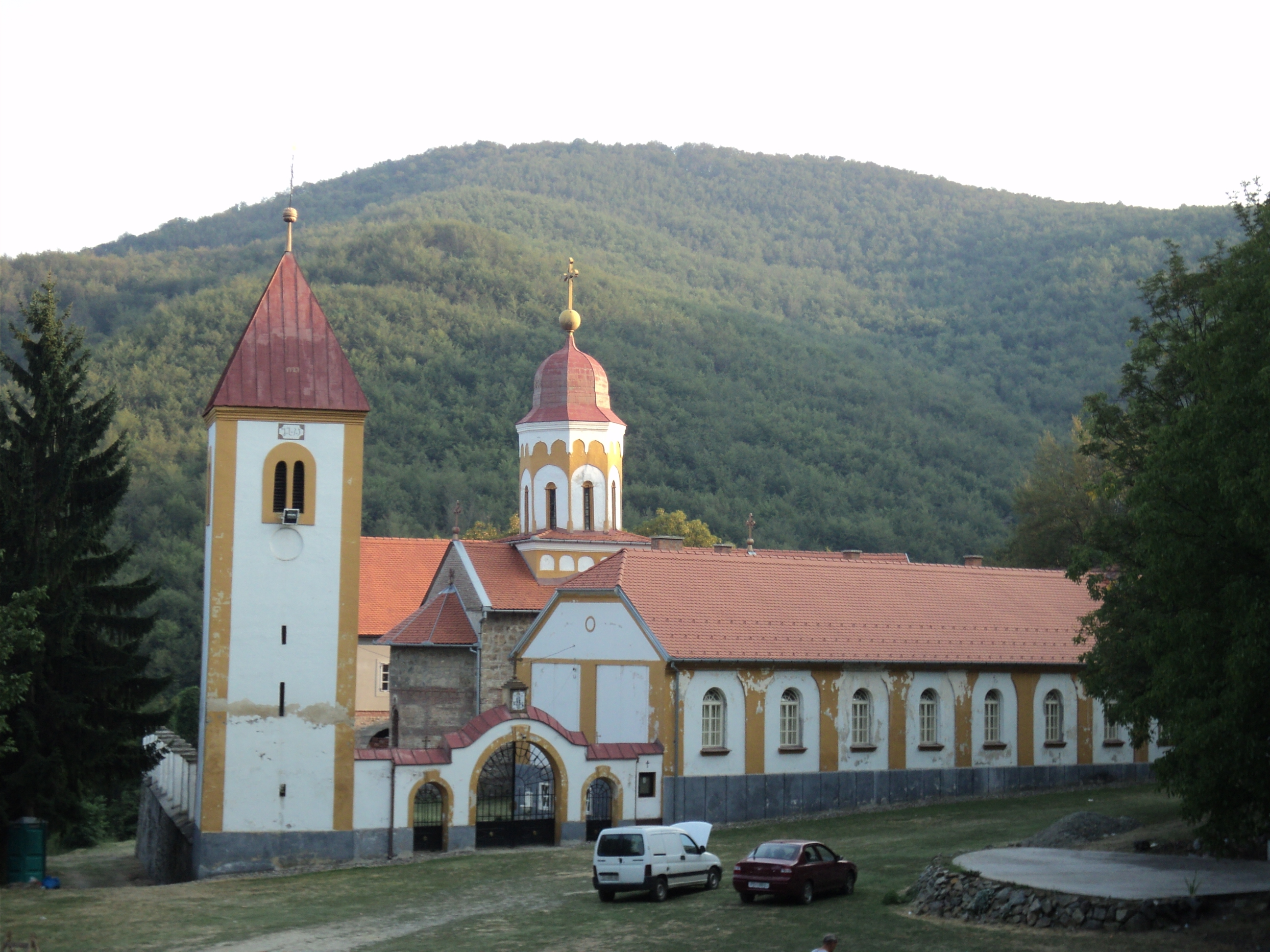
- Orahovica Monastery

- Location within Croatia
- Interactive map of Orahovica Monastery

Monastery information
- Denomination: Eastern Orthodoxy
- Established: XV century
- Diocese: Eparchy of Slavonia

Site
- Location: Duzluk
- Country: Croatia
- Coordinates: 45.49°N 17.87°E

The Orahovica Monastery (Serbian: Манастир Ораховица, romanized: Manastir Orahovica) is a Serbian Orthodox monastery in the village of Duzluk of Orahovica, Croatia. It is mentioned in 1583 when it was a seat of the Požega metropolitanate and an important culturo-religious center, located in the then Virovitica County. It is thought to have been built before the end of the 15th century.

== See also ==
- List of Serb Orthodox monasteries
