= List of prefects of Virovitica-Podravina County =

This is a list of prefects of Virovitica-Podravina County.

== Prefects of Virovitica-Podravina County (1993–present) ==
Croatian Democratic Union (HDZ)
Croatian Peasant Party (HSS)
Croatian Party of Rights (HSP)

No.	Portrait	Name (Born–Died)	Term of Office		Party
1		Stjepan Mikolčić (1959–)	4 May 1993	5 June 1997	HDZ
2		Đuro Dečak (1952–)	5 June 1997	25 February 2000	HDZ
3		Ivan Horvat (1959–)	25 February 2000	25 January 2001	HDZ
4		Ivan Begović (1953–)	25 June 2001	29 June 2005	HSS
5		Zvonimir Šimić (1957–)	29 June 2005	12 January 2007	HSP
6		Stjepan Feketić (1947–)	12 January 2007	19 March 2008	HDZ
7		Tomislav Tolušić (1979–)	19 March 2008	22 January 2016	HDZ
8		Sanja Bošnjak (1968–)	22 January 2016	26 May 2017	HDZ
9		Igor Andrović (1980–)	26 May 2017	Incumbent	HDZ

== See also ==
- Virovitica-Podravina County
