= Virovitica killings =

- Part of the Croatian War of Independence
- Location: Virovitica, Croatia
- Date: June 1991-April 1992
- Target: Croatian Serbs
- Attack type: torture, mass murder
- Deaths: Unknown
- Perpetrator: Croatian Army (HV)

The Virovitica killings refers to the disappearances, torture and murder of Croatian Serb civilians in the town of Virovitica during the Croatian War of Independence.

== Background ==
By June 1991 tensions between ethnic Serbs and Croats broke out into full-scale war, which lasted until 1995. Virovitica is a town located in Slavonia, along the Drava river, near the Hungarian border. In 1991, the city recorded 16,167 inhabitants of which 11.7% were Serbs.

== Crimes ==
Unlike in the district of Gospić or in Sisak, the atrocities against Serbs in Virovitica were not as widespread. Beginning in the summer of 1991, however, numerous cases of crimes against civilians were recorded. The most notable instance concerns the case of Bogdan Mudrinić, who was taken from his home by members of the Croatian Army (HV). He was put in the military prison in Virovitica and beaten to death sometime between 11 and 13 December 1991. Afterwards, his body was taken out of the prison, where it was never since found. Ranko Mitrić, a physician, was taken from the hospital where he worked. On 1 November 1991, he was taken into custody by military police, charged with attacking a police officer. After being interrogated, he was handed over to police and then back to Croatian soldiers. The next day, he was killed and his body was thrown into a shaft that was then mined.

From July to early September 1991, civilians Ranko Starović, Stevan Radlović, Slobodan Poplašen, and Mićo Petrović went missing. In December 1991, the elderly Milenko Momčilović was killed, his body still having not been found. On 11 January 1992, Duško Šaponja was abducted, tortured and killed. He was shot with some 70 bullets, stabbed, disfigured, partially decapitated, then tied to a car and dragged to a local village where his body was found by factory workers. After his murder, one of the two culprits (Darko Pil) returned to the house and raped his wife. In April 1992, Vladimir Grubor was taken away from the village of Majkovac Podravski and never seen again. Apart from Mitrić and Šaponja, the bodies of the victims have never been found. The Serb National Council notes that these are only the documented cases of crimes and that there are more victims.

== Trials ==
In April 1992, Darko Pil and Ivica Majetić, members of the Croatian Army, were sentenced to 15 and 12 years in prison respectively, by the Military Court in Bjelovar for the crime against Dusko Šaponja and his wife. Pil served six years while Majetić was pardoned by then-Croatian President Franjo Tudjman and sent to fight in the Bosnian War where he wound up losing both of his legs in action. In 2006, Pil was ordered to pay the widow of Šaponja, Dubravka Jagodić, 50,000 Kuna for raping her. Pil and Majetić were also ordered to compensate the family. However, nothing has been paid out Jagodić; Majetić's house was foreclosed in 2011. In turn, Jagodić was ordered to pay the costs of the lost litigation. Jagodić initiated a lawsuit against the state, requesting damages. After two first instance rulings in her favor, the Supreme Court rejected the compensation request, stating that the stature of limitations had run out.

In 2001, proceedings against four defendants, Željko Iharoš, Ivan Vrban, Anđelko Kašaj and Luka Perak, were initiated by the County Court in Bjelovar. They were charged for the murders of Mudrinić and Mitrić, as well as the physical assaults of civilians Rade Svorcan and Đuro Svorcan. In March 2006, they were acquitted, which was confirmed by the Supreme Court in 2009.
