= Miroslav Feldman =

Croatian-Jewish poet & writer (1899–1976)

- Born: 28 December 1899; Virovitica, Kingdom of Croatia-Slavonia, Austria-Hungary
- Died: 30 May 1976 (aged 76); Zagreb, SR Croatia, SFR Yugoslavia
- Occupations: Physician, writer, poet
- Writing career
- Genre: Drama

Dr. Miroslav Feldman (28 December 1899 – 30 May 1976) was a Croatian-Jewish poet and writer. Feldman was born in Virovitica on 28 December 1899. He studied medicine in Zagreb and Vienna. After graduation, he returned to Croatia and worked as a physician in Virovitica, Osijek, Pakrac, Sarajevo and Zagreb. During World War II he joined the Partisans, where he helped organize the medical corps.

Feldman was the president of the Croatian and Yugoslav PEN. He began his career as a poet, but he was most notable as a drama writer. Feldman wrote a psychological drama with elements of the grotesque, and works with a strong social critique, in which he satirically speaks of occurrence in the province and life of the higher society.

Feldman died in Zagreb on 30 May 1976 and was buried at the Mirogoj Cemetery.

== Works ==
- "Arhipelag snova"
- "Vožnja"
- "Zec"
- "Profesor Žič"
- "U pozadini"
- "Iz mraka"

== Bibliography ==
- Snješka Knežević, Aleksander Laslo (2011). Židovski Zagreb. Zagreb: AGM, Židovska općina Zagreb. ISBN 978-953-174-393-8.
- Romano, Jaša (1980). Jevreji Jugoslavije 1941–1945: žrtve genocida i učesnici narodnooslobodilačkog rata. Beograd: Jevrejski Istorijski Muzej, Saveza jevrejskih opština Jugoslavije.
