= Čemernica, Croatia =

Coordinates: 45°48′58″N 17°26′22″E

Čemernica
- Village
- Interactive map of Čemernica
- Country: Croatia
- County: Virovitica-Podravina County
- Municipality: Virovitica

Area
  - Total: 1.2 sq mi (3.0 km^{2})

Population (2021)
  - Total: 645
  - Density: 560/sq mi (220/km^{2})
- Time zone: UTC+1 (CET)
  - Summer (DST): UTC+2 (CEST)

Čemernica is a village in Croatia, in the municipality of Virovitica. It is connected by the D2 highway.
