= Golo Brdo, Virovitica-Podravina County =

Settlement in Virovitica-Podravina County, Croatia

Golo Brdo
- Settlement
- Interactive map of Golo Brdo
- Location of Golo Brdo in Croatia
- Coordinates: 45°49′44″N 17°19′36″E
- Country: Croatia
- County: Virovitica-Podravina
- City: Virovitica

Area
  - Total: 8.0 km^{2} (3.1 sq mi)

Population (2021)
  - Total: 303
  - Density: 38/km^{2} (98/sq mi)
- Time zone: UTC+1 (CET)
  - Summer (DST): UTC+2 (CEST)
- Postal code: 33000 Virovitica
- Area code: +385 (0)33

Golo Brdo is a settlement in the City of Virovitica in Croatia. In 2021, its population was 303.

== Demographics ==
Golo Brdo: Population trends 1857–2021
v

| population | | | | 22 | 150 | 189 | | 368 | 402 | 436 | 443 | 382 | 333 | 361 | 366 | 364 | 303 |
| | 1857 | 1869 | 1880 | 1890 | 1900 | 1910 | 1921 | 1931 | 1948 | 1953 | 1961 | 1971 | 1981 | 1991 | 2001 | 2011 | 2021 |

Sources: Croatian Bureau of Statistics publications
