= Virovitica =

- City
- Grad Virovitica; City of Virovitica
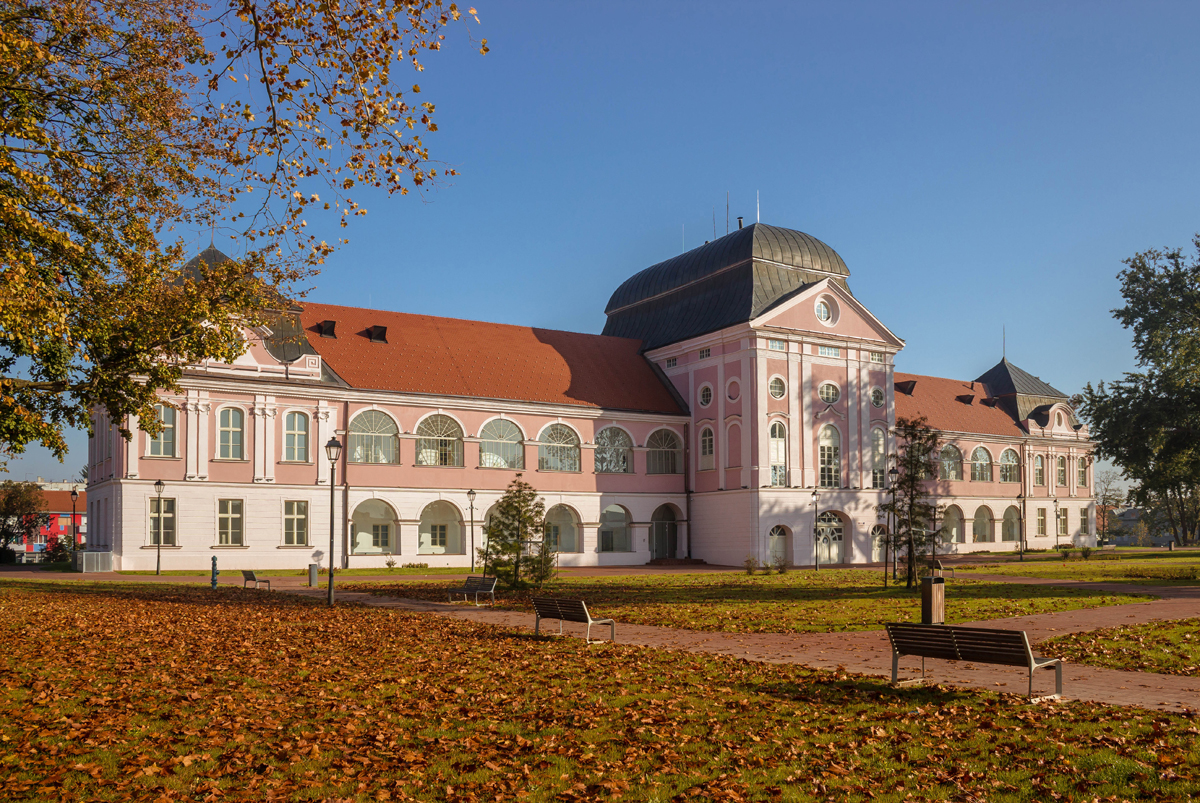
- Pejačević Castle in Virovitica

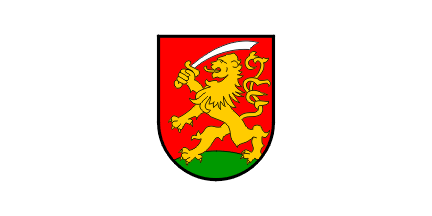
- Flag
- Interactive map of Virovitica
- Location of Virovitica in Croatia
- Coordinates: 45°50′N 17°23′E
- Country: Croatia
- Region: Slavonia (Podravina)
- County: Virovitica-Podravina County

Government
  - Mayor: Ivica Kirin (HDZ)

Area
  - City: 170.7 km^{2} (65.9 sq mi)
  - Urban: 38.1 km^{2} (14.7 sq mi)
- Elevation: 122 m (400 ft)

Population (2021)
  - City: 19,302
  - Density: 113.1/km^{2} (292.9/sq mi)
  - Urban: 13,486
  - Urban density: 354/km^{2} (917/sq mi)
- Time zone: UTC+1 (CET)
  - Summer (DST): UTC+2 (CEST)
- Postal code: 33 000
- Area code: +385 (0) 33
- Vehicle registration: VT
- Website: virovitica.hr

Virovitica (pronounced [ʋirɔʋǐtit͡sa]) is a Croatian city near the Hungarian border. It is situated near the Drava river and belongs to the historic region of Slavonia. Virovitica has a population of 14,688, with 21,291 people in the municipality (census 2011). It is also the capital of Virovitica-Podravina County.

== Name ==
Virovitica has also historically been known by the names Wirowititz/Virovititz and Wirowitiza (German), Viroviticza, Verewitiza, Verowitiza, Verowtiza, Verőce (Hungarian) and Varaviza (Italian), Viroviticza or Verucia (Latin).

== Climate ==
Between 1994 and 2010, the highest temperature recorded at the local Bikana station was 39.5 °C (103.1 °F), on 18 August 2003. The coldest temperature was −21.5 °C (−6.7 °F), on 31 December 1996.

At the Virovitica station, recording since 1951, the highest temperature recorded was 39.2 °C (102.6 °F), on 27 June 1965. The coldest temperature was −29.5 °C (−21.1 °F), on 23 January 1963.

== History ==
The town is first mentioned in 1234 as magna villa Wereuche. It was part of the Ottoman Empire between 1552 and 1684, with the role of a city fortress in the Sanjak of Pojega (1552–1601). Later it was part of the Sanjak of Rahoviçe in the Kanije Eyalet (1601–1684) until the Habsburg conquest in 1684.

In the late 19th century and early 20th century, Virovitica was a district capital in the Virovitica County of the Kingdom of Croatia-Slavonia.

By June 1991 tensions between ethnic Serbs and Croats broke out into full-scale war, which lasted until 1995. An unknown number of deaths, forced disappearances, and atrocities were committed against Croatian Serb civilians within Virovitica.

== Demographics ==
The following settlements comprise the administrative area of the city of Virovitica:

- Čemernica, population 645
- Golo Brdo, population 303
- Jasenaš, population 53
- Korija, population 648
- Milanovac, population 1,515
- Podgorje, population 737
- Rezovac, population 1,146
- Rezovačke Krčevine, population 295
- Sveti Đurađ, population 474
- Virovitica, population 13,486
City of Virovitica: Population trends 1857–2021
v

population	4869	6356	6540	7762	8980	9682	11243	13088	13222	15136	17578	19367	20905	22931	22618	21291	19302
	1857	1869	1880	1890	1900	1910	1921	1931	1948	1953	1961	1971	1981	1991	2001	2011	2021

Sources: Croatian Bureau of Statistics publications

== Politics ==
=== Minority councils ===
Directly elected minority councils and representatives are tasked with consulting tasks for the local or regional authorities in which they are advocating for minority rights and interests, integration into public life and participation in the management of local affairs. At the 2023 Croatian national minorities councils and representatives elections, the Serbs of Croatia fulfilled legal requirements to elect 15 members minority councils of the Town of Virovitica, but only 12 representatives ended up being elected to the body.

== Culture ==
The patron saint of Virovitica is St. Rocco (Sv. Rok), celebrated every August 16.

Đorđe Balašević wrote a song titled Virovitica, praising his time spent in the city.

== Sports ==
The local chapter of the HPS is HPD "Papuk", which had 72 members in 1936 under the Lovro Bakotić presidency. At the time, it had ski, music and photography sections. Membership rose to 76 in 1937, but fell to 71 in 1938.

It is also known for the yearly karting tournament hosted by the official HAKS. The tournament is also on the official list of karting tournaments for the karting season.

== Location ==
The town lies on the intersection of the state roads D2 and D5 and also has a bus station.

The towns has one train station and one halt - it lies on R202 railway corridor.

== Notable people ==
- Željka Antunović (born 1955), politician
- Ivan Dečak (born 1979), singer
- Stanija Dobrojević (born 1985) Serbian television personality
- Damir Doma, fashion designer
- Miroslav Feldman (1899–1976), poet and writer
- Andrija Hebrang (1899–1949?), politician
- Tomislav Maretić (1854–1938), linguist
- Ksenija Marinković (born 1966), actress
- Zrinko Ogresta (born 1958), film director
- Renata Pokupić (born 1972), opera singer
- Petar Preradović (1818–1872), poet and general
- Vlado Singer (1908–1943), politician
- Konstantin Čupković, Serbian professional volleyball player
- Dijana Vukomanović, Serbian political scientist and politician
- Ivan Šibl, Yugoslav military officer
- Edita Schubert (1947–2001), Croatian artist

== Twin towns – sister cities ==
Virovitica is twinned with:

- Barcs, Hungary
- Jajce, Bosnia and Herzegovina
- Traunreut, Germany
- Vyškov, Czech Republic
- Mátranovák, Hungary

== Gallery ==
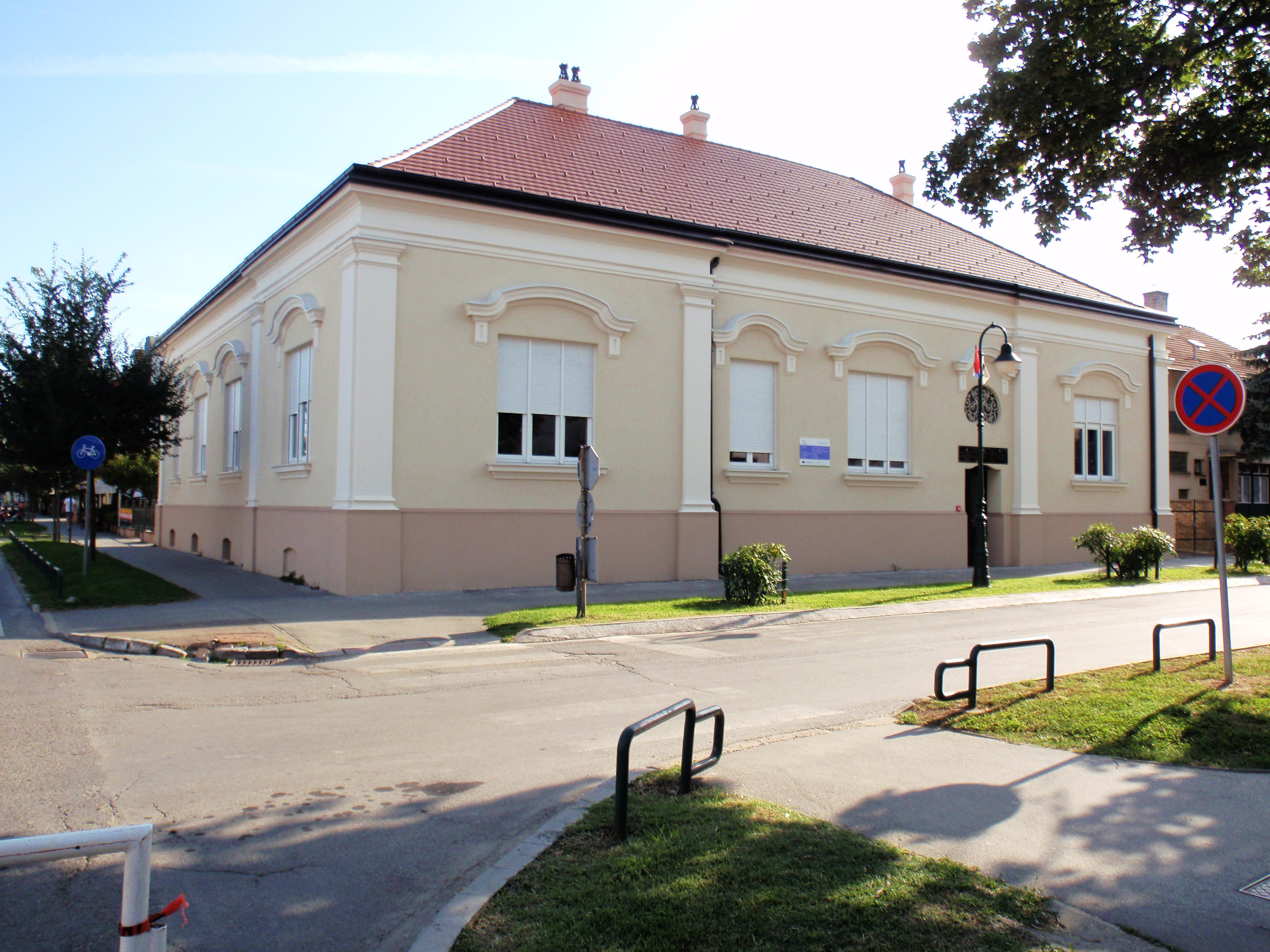
Schubert House

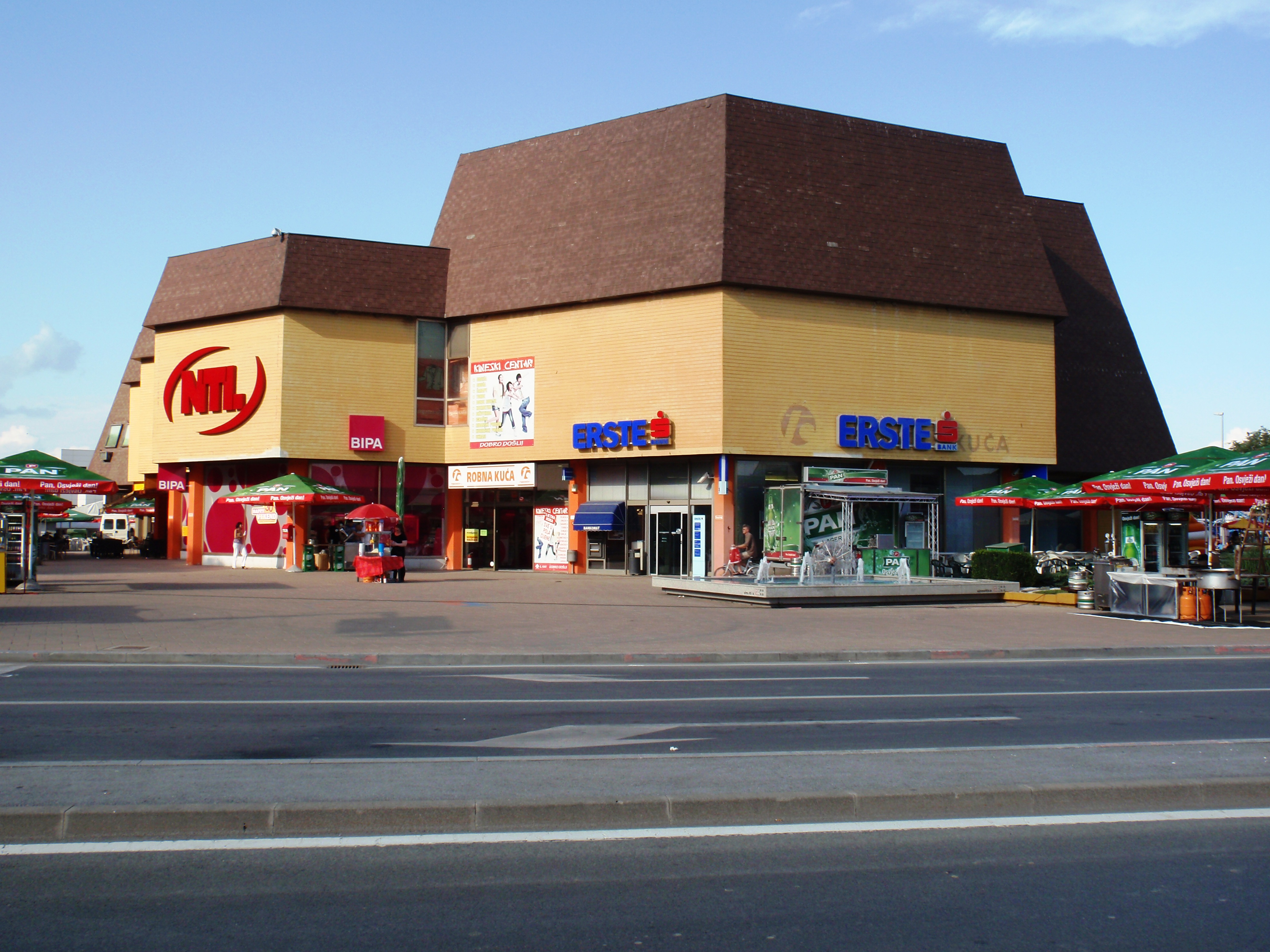
Central department store

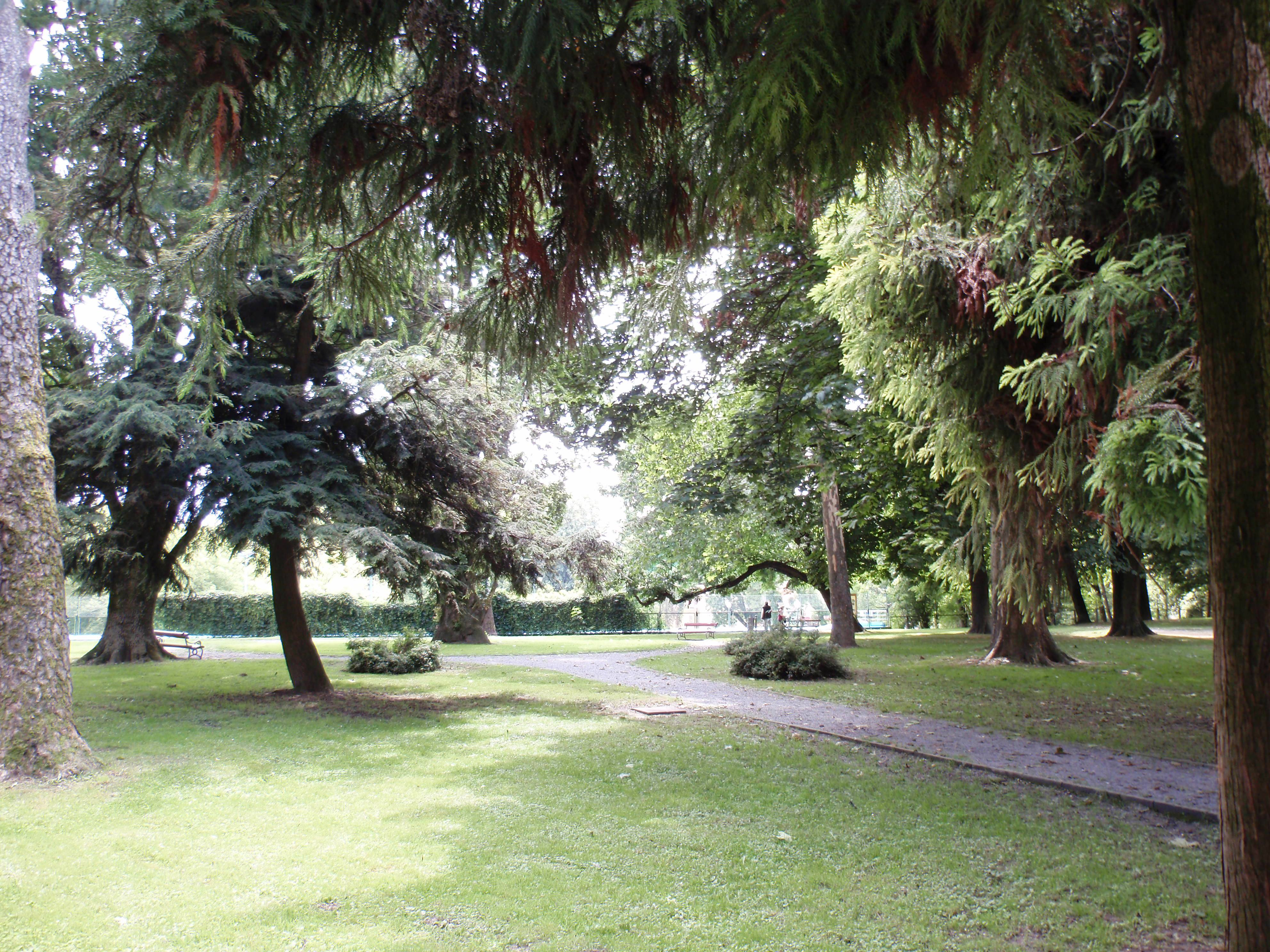
City Park

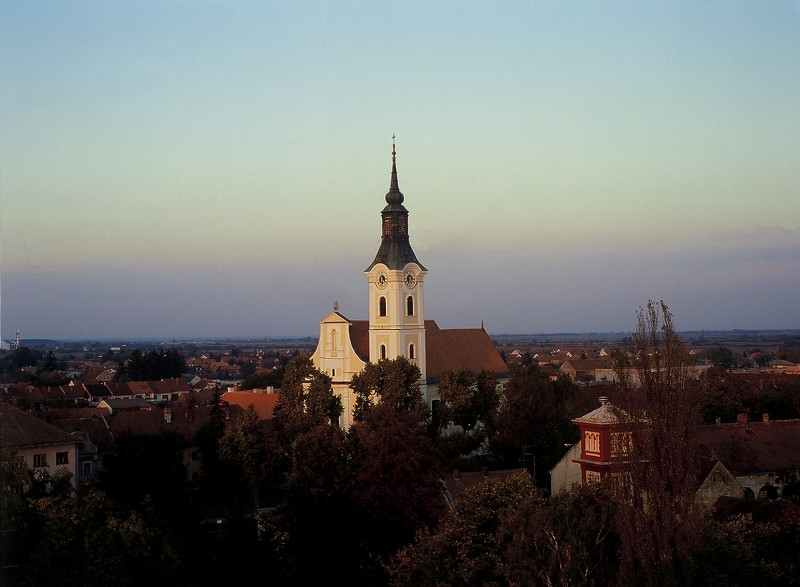
Church in Virovitica

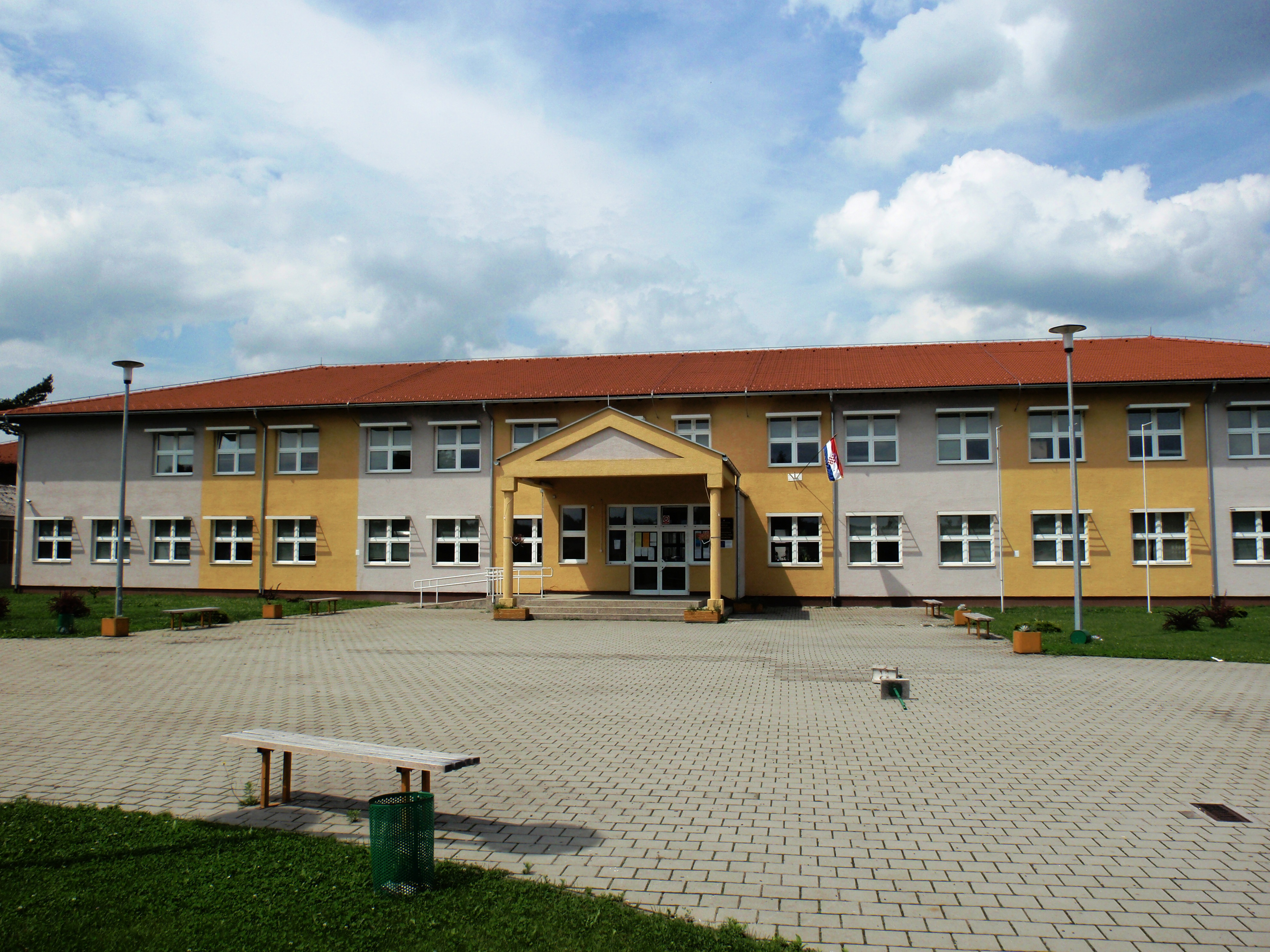
Vocational Secondary School

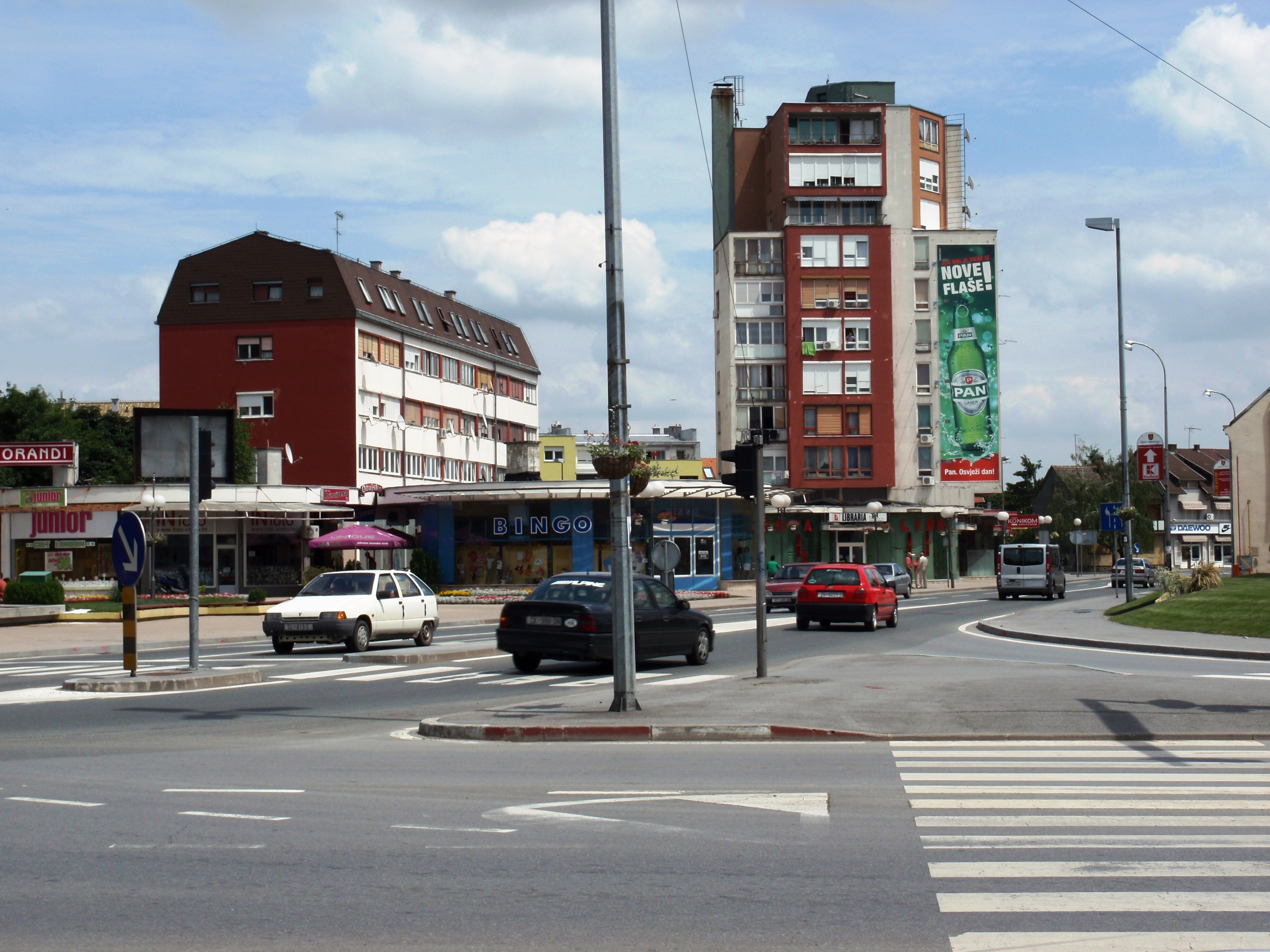
Stjepan Radić Street

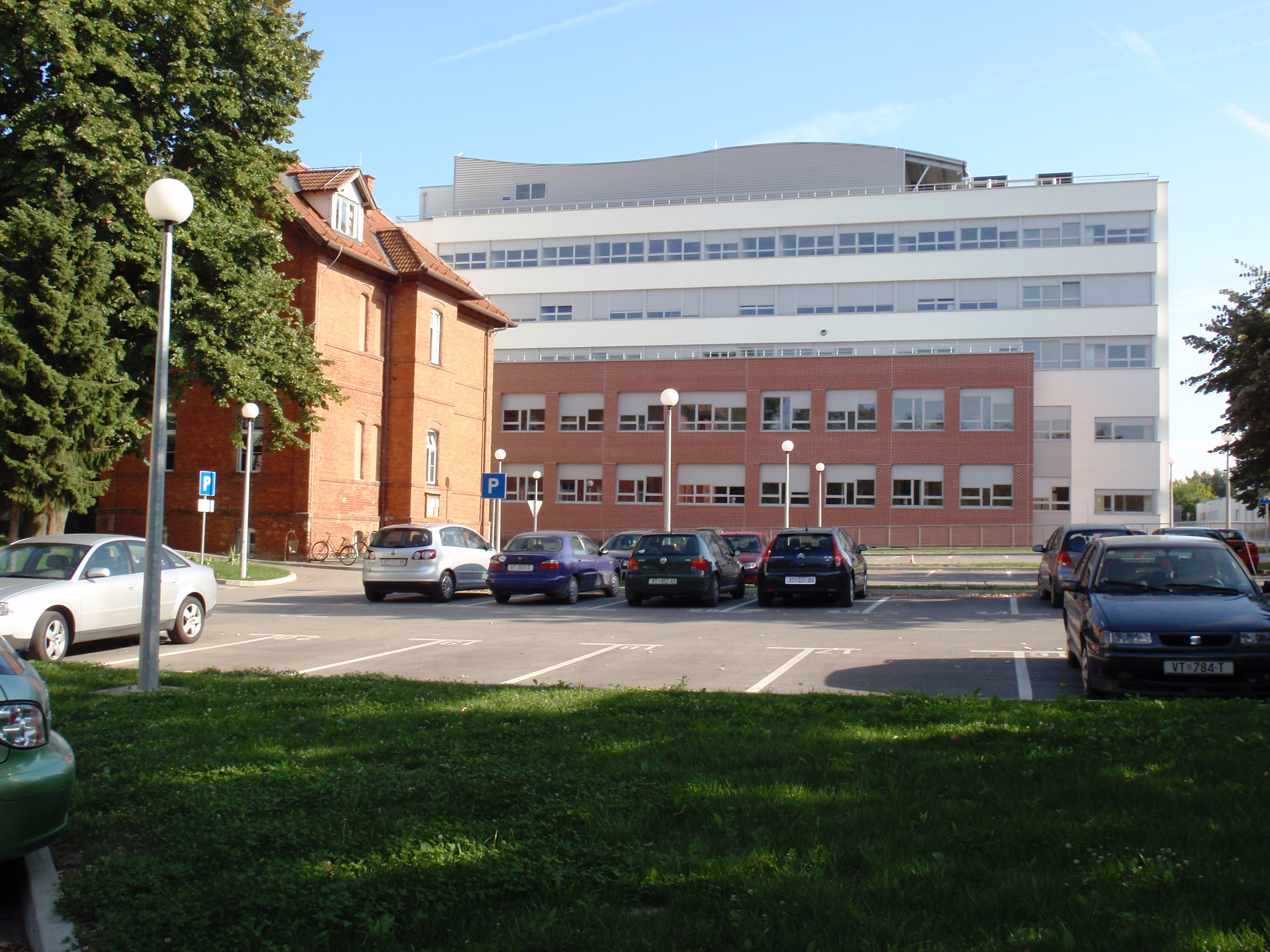
Virovitica Hospital
