= Crnac, Virovitica-Podravina County =

Crnac
- Municipality
- Location of Crnac in Croatia
- Coordinates: 45°42′N 17°56′E
- Country: Croatia
- County: Virovitica-Podravina County

Area
  - Municipality: 79.4 km^{2} (30.7 sq mi)
  - Urban: 22.7 km^{2} (8.8 sq mi)

Population (2021)
  - Municipality: 1,116
  - Density: 14.1/km^{2} (36.4/sq mi)
  - Urban: 407
  - Urban density: 17.9/km^{2} (46.4/sq mi)
- Website: opcina-crnac.hr

Crnac is a village and municipality in Croatia in the Virovitica–Podravina County. It has a total population of 1,456, distributed in the following settlements:

- Breštanovci, population 153
- Crnac, population 494
- Krivaja Pustara, population 3
- Mali Rastovac, population 54
- Milanovac, population 54
- Novo Petrovo Polje, population 164
- Staro Petrovo Polje, population 182
- Suha Mlaka, population 105
- Veliki Rastovac, population 238
- Žabnjača, population 9

In the 2011 census, 92% of the population were Croats.

Colonist settlements of Breštanovci and Žabnjača were established on the territory of the municipality of Podravska Moslavina during the land reform in interwar Yugoslavia.

== Politics ==
=== Minority councils ===
Directly elected minority councils and representatives are tasked with consulting tasks for the local or regional authorities in which they are advocating for minority rights and interests, integration into public life and participation in the management of local affairs. At the 2023 Croatian national minorities councils and representatives elections Serbs of Croatia fulfilled legal requirements to elect 10 members minority councils of the Municipality of Crnac but with only 6 representatives being elected in the body in the end.
