= Zvonimirovo =

Zvonimirovo Ladislav, Malo Gaćište, Novo Obilićevo, Zvonimirovac
- Village
- Interactive map of Zvonimirovo
- Coordinates: 45°49′38″N 17°33′29″E
- Country: Croatia
- County: Virovitica-Podravina County
- Municipality: Suhopolje

Area
  - Total: 7.8 km^{2} (3.0 sq mi)

Population (2021)
  - Total: 79
  - Density: 10/km^{2} (26/sq mi)
- Time zone: UTC+1 (CET)
  - Summer (DST): UTC+2 (CEST)

Zvonimirovo, formerly Ladislav, Malo Gaćište, Novo Obilićevo, and Zvonimirovac, is a village in Croatia.

== History ==
On 20 September 1941, the NDH changed the name of the town from Novo Obilićevo to Zvonimirovac.

== Demographics ==
Village of Zvonimirovo: Population trends 1857–2021
v

population		451	267	289	291	252	201	292	372	394	337	255	199	172	119	112	79
	1857	1869	1880	1890	1900	1910	1921	1931	1948	1953	1961	1971	1981	1991	2001	2011	2021

Note:Until 1900 it was recorded as Ladislav, then in 1910 and 1921 Malo Gaćište, then from 1931 to 1991 Novo Obilićevo. From 1869 to 1921 it is recorded as a "dio naselja", and from 1931 on as an independent "naselje". Sources: Croatian Bureau of Statistics publications
