= Orahovica =

- Town
- Grad Orahovica; Town of Orahovica
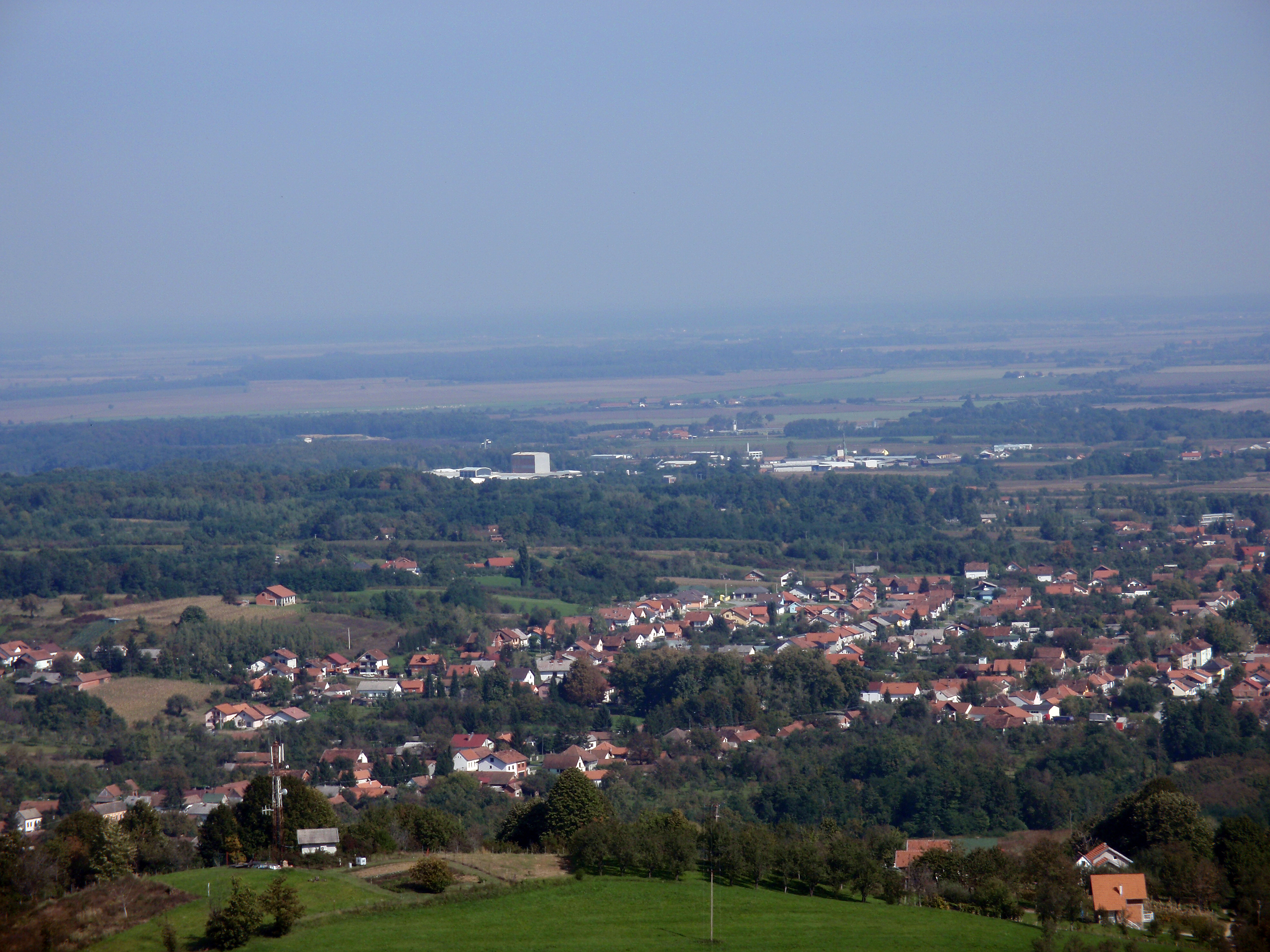
- View of Orahovica

- Flag
- Interactive map of Orahovica
- Location of Orahovica in Croatia
- Coordinates: 45.532853°N 17.879537°E
- Country: Croatia
- Region: Slavonia
- County: Virovitica-Podravina County

Government
  - Mayor: Saša Rister (HDZ)

Area
  - Town: 124.2 km^{2} (48.0 sq mi)
  - Urban: 34.6 km^{2} (13.4 sq mi)
- Elevation: 183 m (600 ft)

Population (2021)
  - Town: 4,537
  - Density: 36.53/km^{2} (94.61/sq mi)
  - Urban: 3,384
  - Urban density: 97.8/km^{2} (253/sq mi)
- Postal Code: 33515
- Area code: +385 33
- Vehicle registration: NA, SL
- Website: orahovica.hr

Orahovica is a town in Slavonia, Croatia. It is situated on the slopes of the mountain Papuk and positioned on the state road D2 Varaždin-Koprivnica-Našice-Osijek.

== History ==
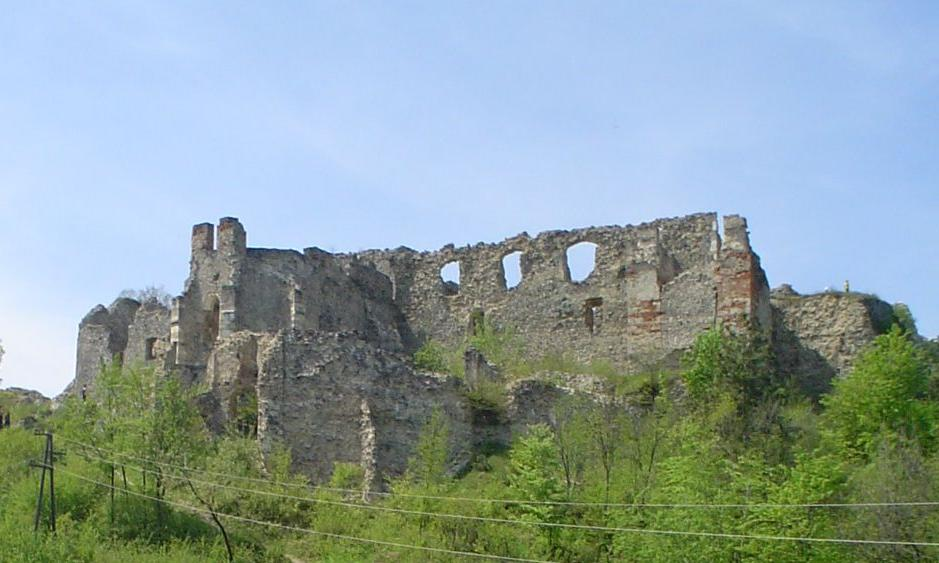
Ružica Castle

The name Orahovica is derived from the word orah 'walnut tree'.

Orahovica was first officially mentioned in 1228 in a historical document issued by King Andrew II. Ružica Castle, not far from Orahovica, was first mentioned in 1357 as a royal estate. In the 15th century and the first half of the 16th century, the town was a thriving community owned by various patricians (Nikola Kont, Lovro Iločki, Ladislav Iločki, Ladislav More, etc.)

Suleiman I, in his 1542 campaign, conquered Orahovica. It was renamed Rahoviçe and was initially a kaza centre in the Sanjak of Pojega, which was initially part of the Budin Eyalet (1542–1580), later in the Bosna Eyalet (1580–1600), and finally in the Kanije Eyalet. It became a notable sanjak centre in the Kanije Eyalet in 1601. Ottoman rule lasted until 1687. After the end of Ottoman rule, and up until the end of the 19th century, many prominent noble families, such as the Pejačević family and the Mihalović family, owned the town.

In the late 19th century and early 20th century, Orahovica was part of Virovitica County of the Kingdom of Croatia-Slavonia.

In the 20th century, the town was a centre of a large municipality with well-developed industry and agriculture.

During the Croatian War of Independence, Orahovica was damaged by a number of shell attacks.

It received the status of a town (grad) in 1997.

== Economy ==
Orahovica has a developed industry of tile production, panel-parquet, wine production, fruit and vegetables processing, and metal processing. Agriculture plays an important role for the town economy (crop and livestock farming, fresh water fish, fruit and vineyards).

== Population ==
In the 2011 census, the total population of the administrative area of Orahovica was 5,304, distributed in the following settlements:

- Bijeljevina Orahovička, population 37
- Crkvari, population 128
- Dolci, population 286
- Donja Pištana, population 239
- Duzluk, population 163
- Gornja Pištana, population 5
- Karlovac Feričanački, population 12
- Kokočak, population 14
- Magadinovac, population 11
- Nova Jošava, population 182
- Orahovica, population 3,954
- Stara Jošava, population 240
- Šumeđe, population 33
Town of Orahovica: Population trends 1857–2021
v

population	3655	3834	3730	4136	4581	5745	5954	6845	5601	5906	5890	5834	6244	6262	5792	5304	4537
	1857	1869	1880	1890	1900	1910	1921	1931	1948	1953	1961	1971	1981	1991	2001	2011	2021

Sources: Croatian Bureau of Statistics publications

In 2011, 87% of the population were Croats.

Orahovica (settlement), ethnic composition
Year of census	2001	1991	1981	1971	1961
Croats	3,519 (82.56%)	2,999 (69.51%)	2,593 (64.74%)	2,587 (76.26%)	2,453 (80.82%)
Serbs	478 (11.21%)	771 (17.87%)	618 (15.43%)	604 (17.80%)	495 (16.30%)
Yugoslavs	0	218 (5.05%)	649 (16.20%)	118 (3.47%)	19 (0.62%)
others and unknown	265 (6.21%)	326 (7.55%)	145 (3.62%)	83 (2.44%)	68 (2.24%)
total	4,262	4,314	4,005	3,392	3,035

- Source: CD-rom: "Naselja i stanovništvo RH od 1857-2001. godine", Izdanje Državnog zavoda za statistiku Republike Hrvatske, Zagreb, 2005.

== Politics ==
=== Minority councils ===
Directly elected minority councils and representatives are tasked with consulting tasks for the local or regional authorities in which they are advocating for minority rights and interests, integration into public life and participation in the management of local affairs. At the 2023 Croatian national minorities councils and representatives elections Serbs of Croatia fulfilled legal requirements to elect 15 members minority councils of the Town of Orahovica but with only 11 representatives being elected in the body in the end.

== Notable sights ==
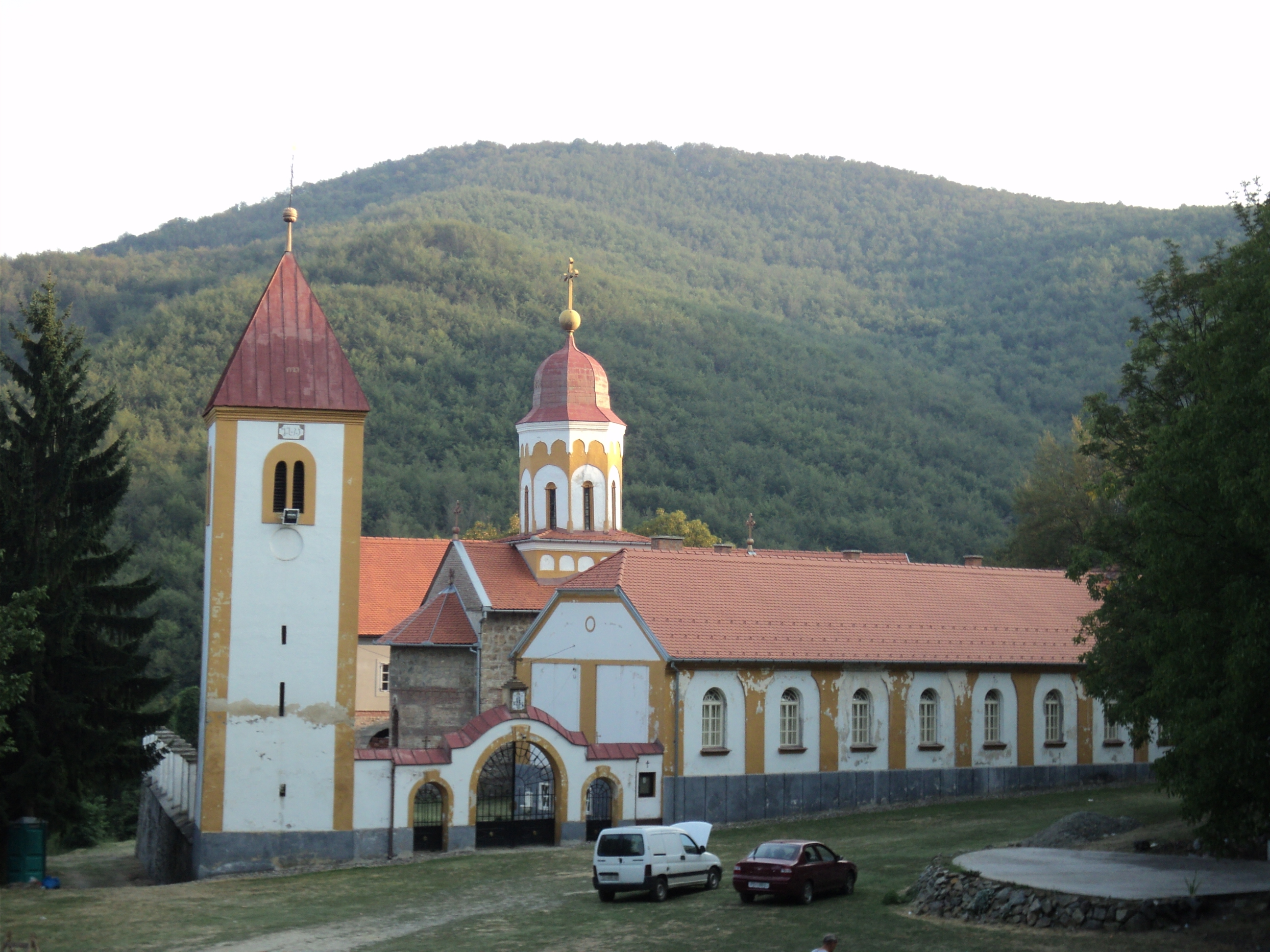
Orahovica Monastery

- Orahovica's Lake - the most popular destination every summer.
- Locomotive "Ćiro" - in the middle of the town
- Ružica grad - old ruins of the fortress near the lake
- Orahovica Monastery - Serbian Orthodox monastery
- Watermill - in the city park

== Education ==
- Kindergarten "Palčić"
- Primary school "I.B. - Mažuranić"
- High School "Stjepan Ivšić"

== Tourism ==
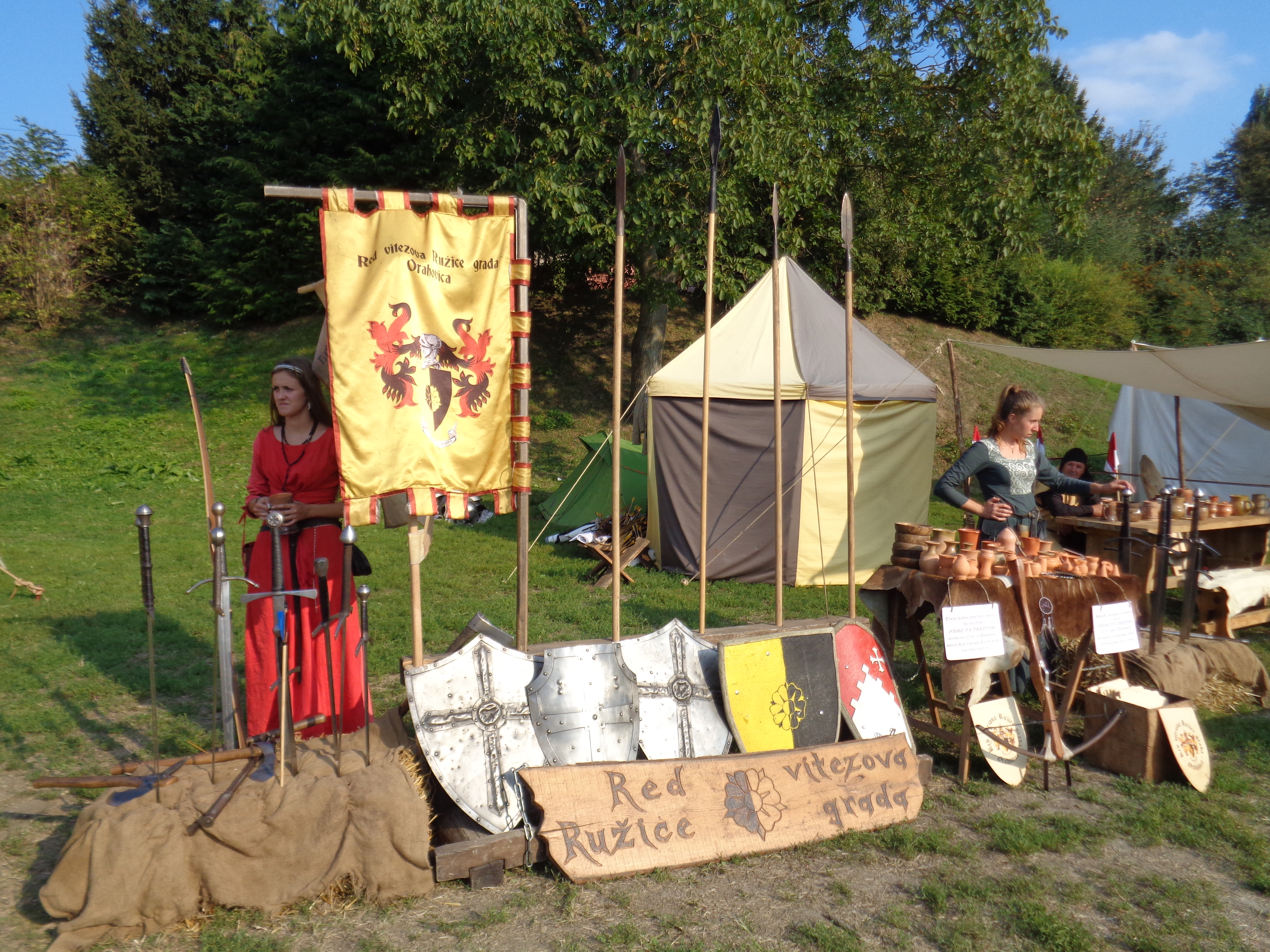
Renaissance festival depicting the Order of the Knights of Ružica Castle

Orahovica became one of the most popular tourist destinations in Virovitica-Podravina County and Slavonia. Its culture, events, beautiful nature, sports and lake attract more and more tourists every year. The Spring of Orahovica, an annual cultural and tourist festival, is held since 1957.

== Notable natives and residents ==
- Robert Domany
- Gojko Zec
- Stjepan Mesić
