= Golo Brdo, Bijeljina =

Golo Brdo Голо Брдо (Serbian)
- Village (Selo)
- Interactive map of Golo Brdo
- Coordinates: 44.7358°N 19.2436°E
- Country: Bosnia and Herzegovina
- Municipality: Bijeljina
- Elevation: 312 ft (95 m)

Population (2013)
  - Total: 392
- Time zone: UTC+1 (CET)
  - Summer (DST): UTC+2 (CEST)

Golo Brdo (Serbian Cyrillic: Голо Брдо) is a village in the municipality of Bijeljina, Bosnia and Herzegovina. As of 2013 it has a population of 392.

== Demography ==
Historical population

Year	Pop.	±%
1948	177	—
1953	202	+14.1%
1961	226	+11.9%
1971	176	−22.1%

Year	Pop.	±%
1981	183	+4.0%
1991	198	+8.2%
2013	392	+98.0%

=== Nationalities ===
Nationality	Number	%
Serbs	195	98.48%
Yugoslavs	1	0.50%
Croats	1	0.50%
Muslims	1	0.50%
