= Čačinci =

Croatian village and municipality

- Location within Croatia
- Coordinates: 45°36′0″N 17°52′12″E
- Country: Croatia
- County: Virovitica-Podravina County

Area
  - Total: 144.9 km^{2} (55.9 sq mi)

Population (2021)
  - Total: 2,162
  - Density: 14.92/km^{2} (38.64/sq mi)
- Time zone: UTC+1 (CET)
  - Summer (DST): UTC+2 (CEST)
- Website: cacinci.hr

Čačinci (German: Schatzenburg) is a village and a municipality in Croatia in Virovitica-Podravina County.

In the 2011 census, it had a total population of 2,802, in the following settlements:

- Brezovljani Vojlovički, population 50
- Bukvik, population 199
- Čačinci, population 2,110
- Humljani, population 129
- Krajna, population 15
- Krasković, no population
- Paušinci, population 168
- Prekoračani, no population
- Pušina, population 33
- Rajino Polje, population 30
- Slatinski Drenovac, population 50
- Vojlovica, population 18

In the same census, about 91% were Croats and 7.24% were Serbs.

It is known for being very hot in the summer and very cold in the winter.

== Politics ==
=== Minority councils ===
Directly elected minority councils and representatives are tasked with consulting tasks for the local or regional authorities in which they are advocating for minority rights and interests, integration into public life and participation in the management of local affairs. At the 2023 Croatian national minorities councils and representatives elections Serbs of Croatia fulfilled legal requirements to elect 10 members minority councils of the Municipality of Čačinci but the elections were not held due to the absence of candidatures.
