= Virovitica-Podravina County =

County in eastern Croatia

Coordinates: 45.873°N 17.505°E

Virovitica-Podravina County Virovitičko-podravska županija (Croatian)
- County
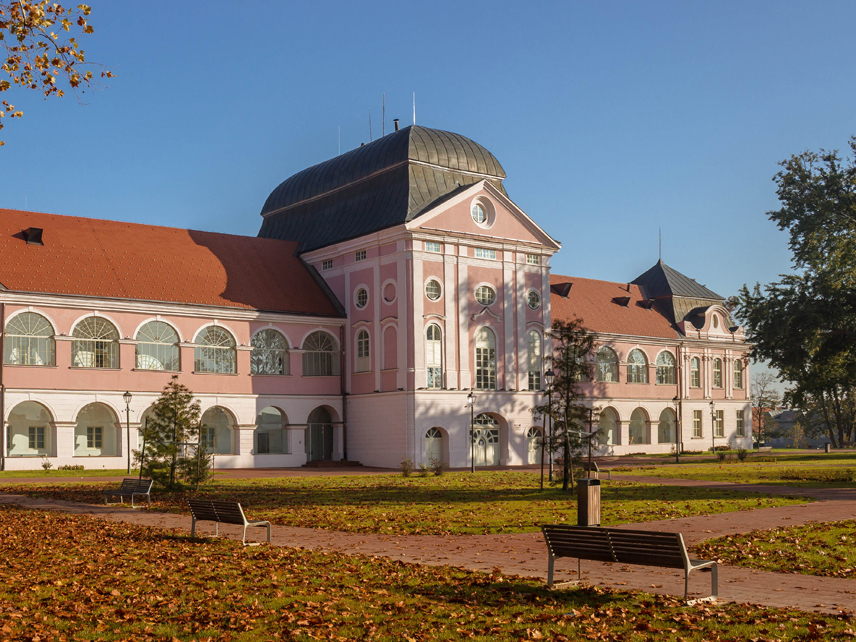
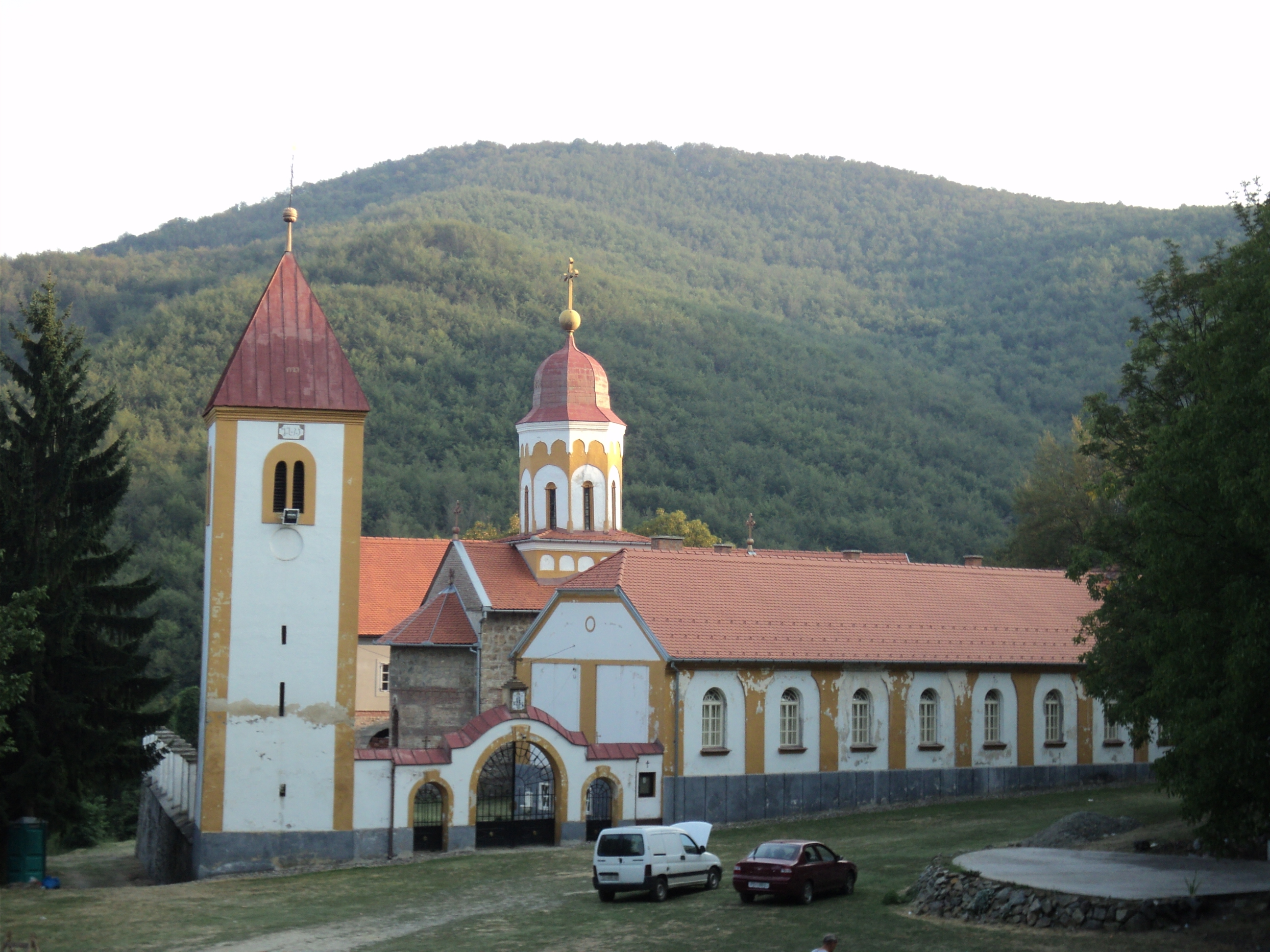
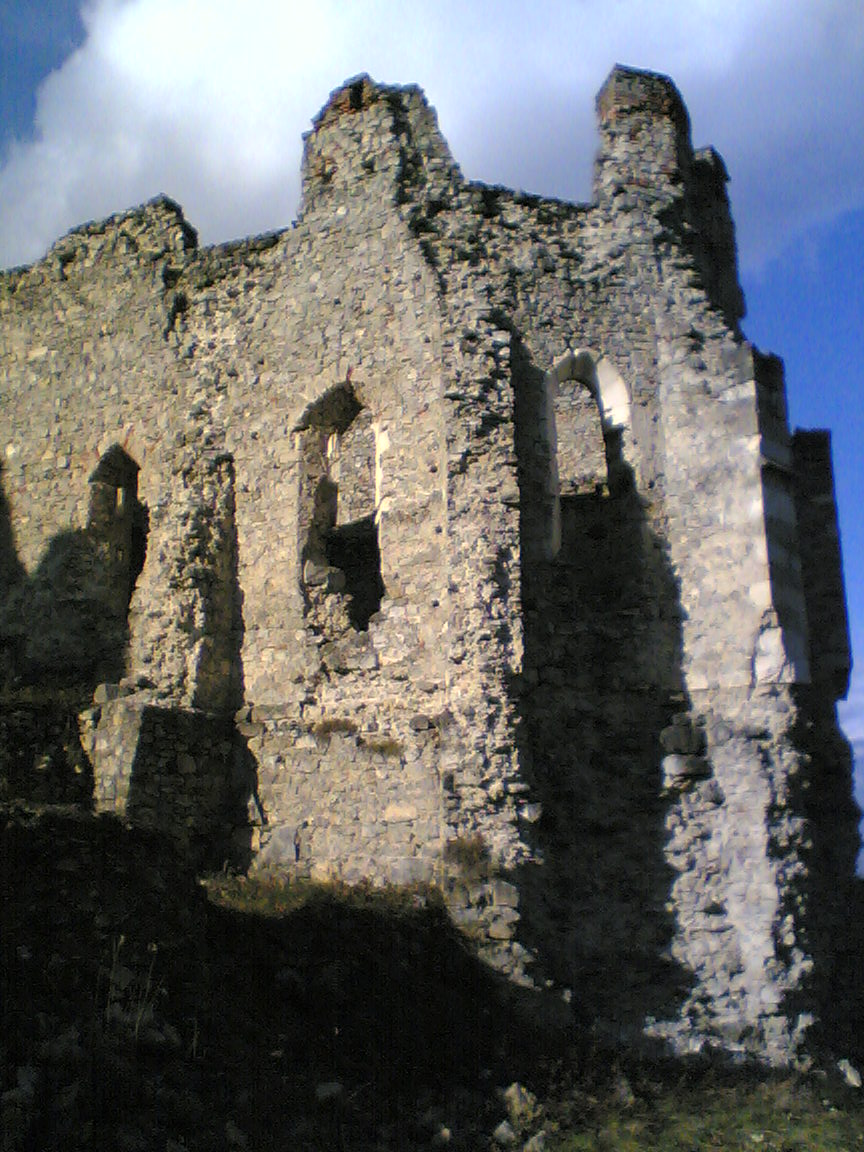
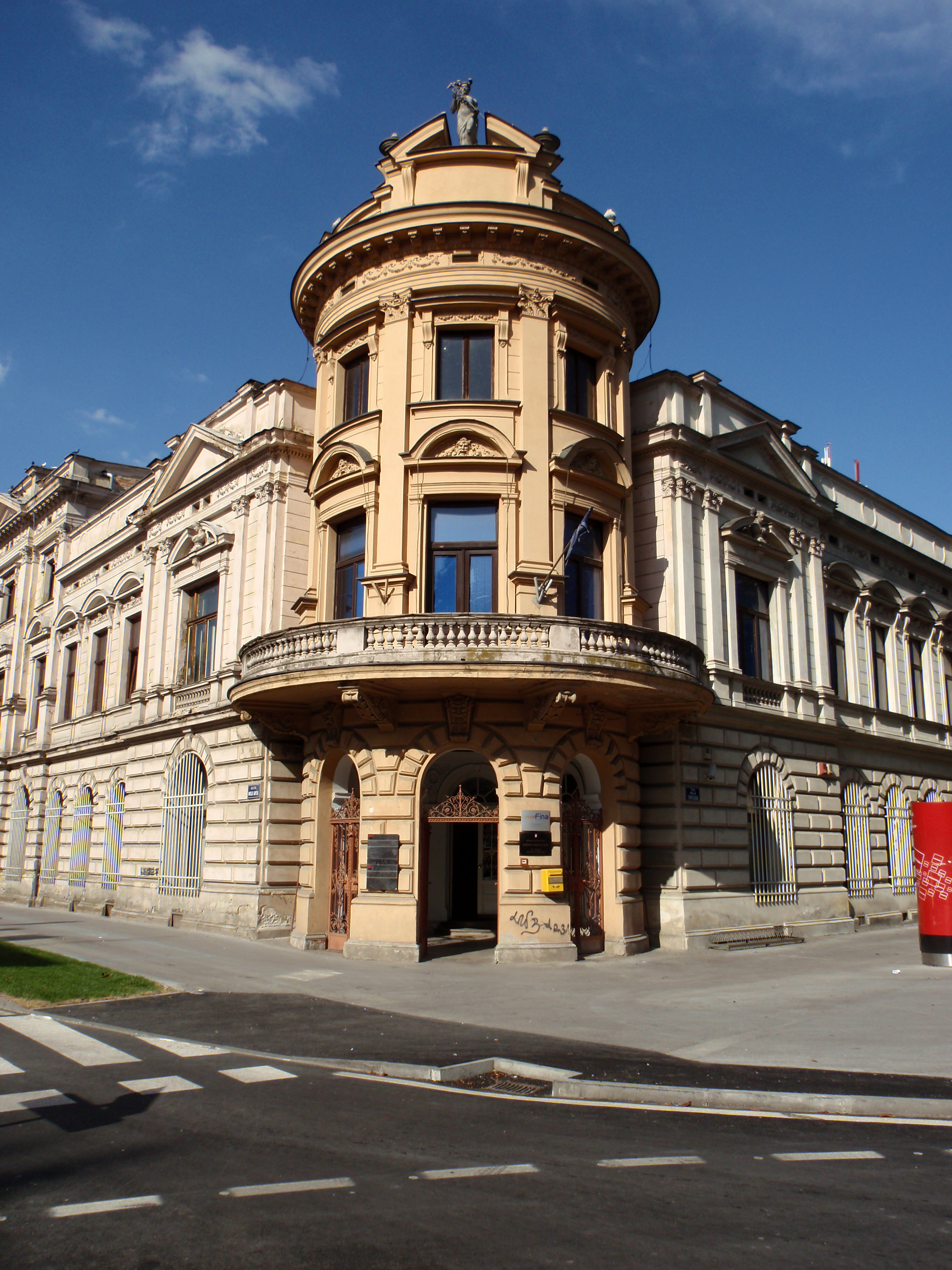
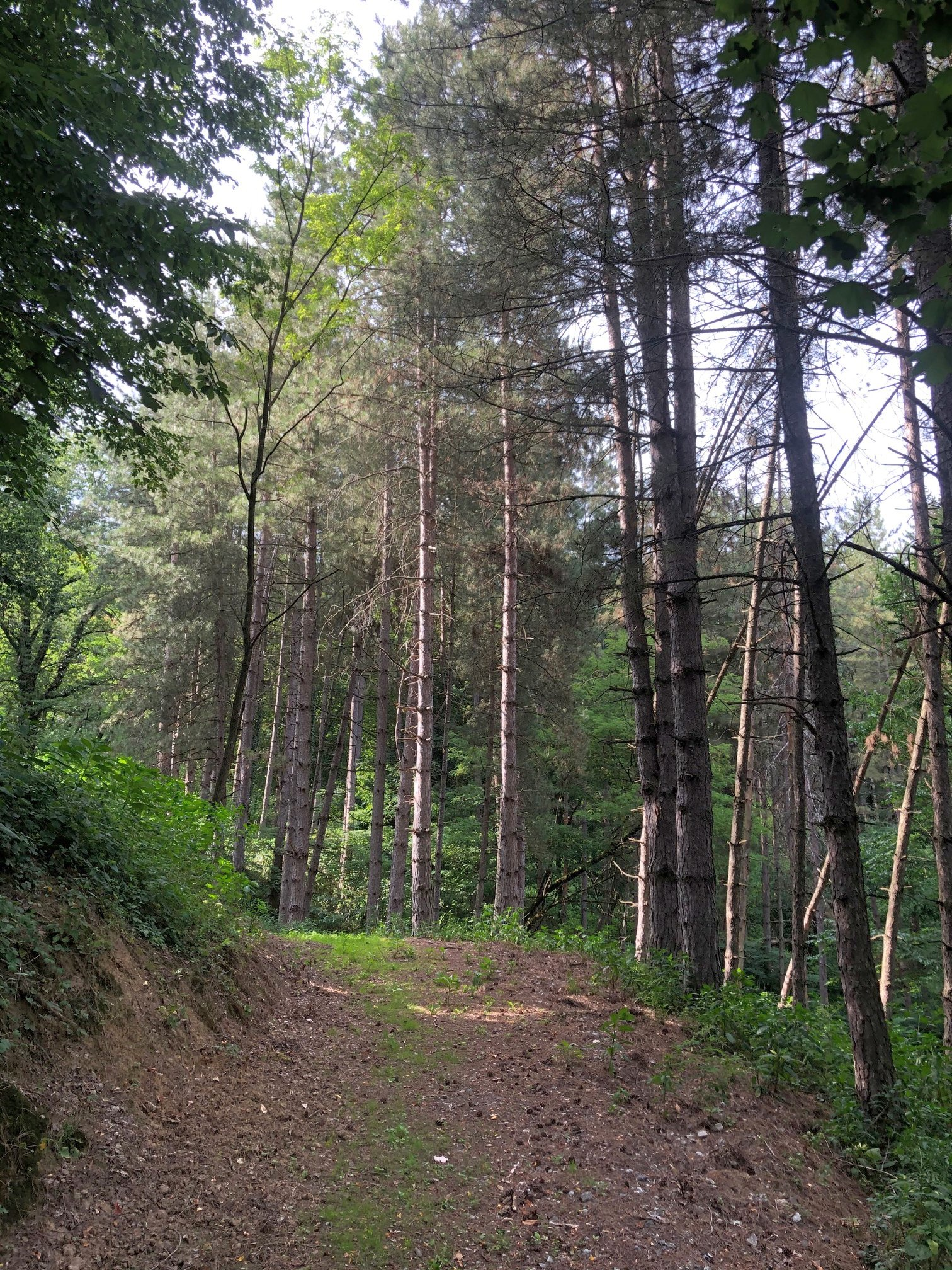
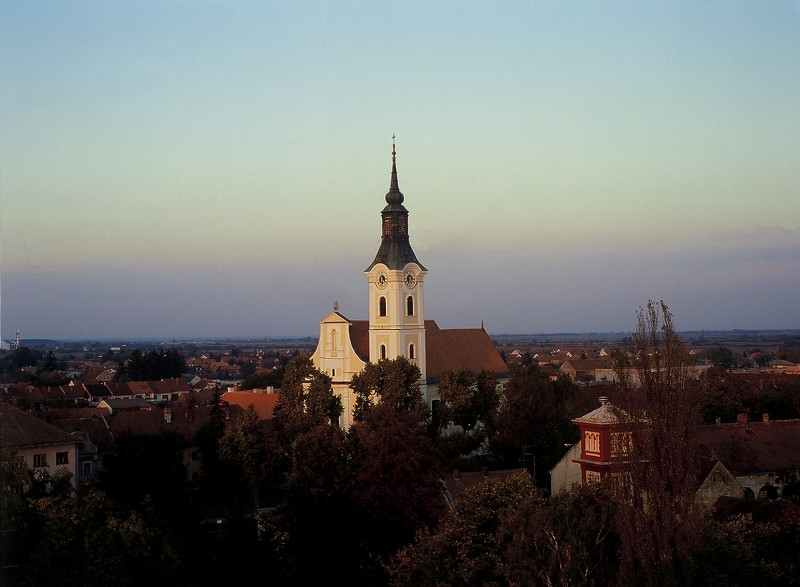
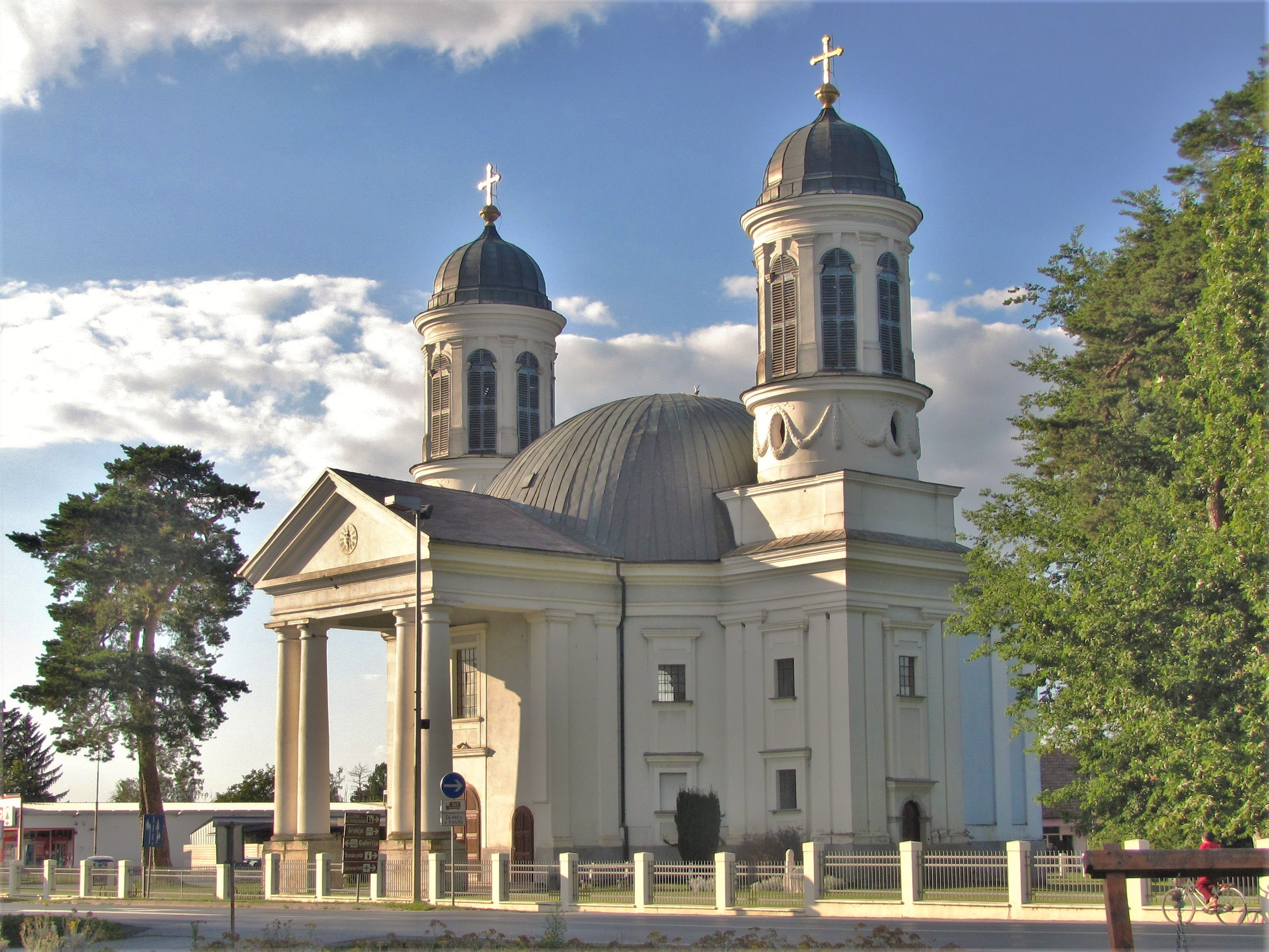
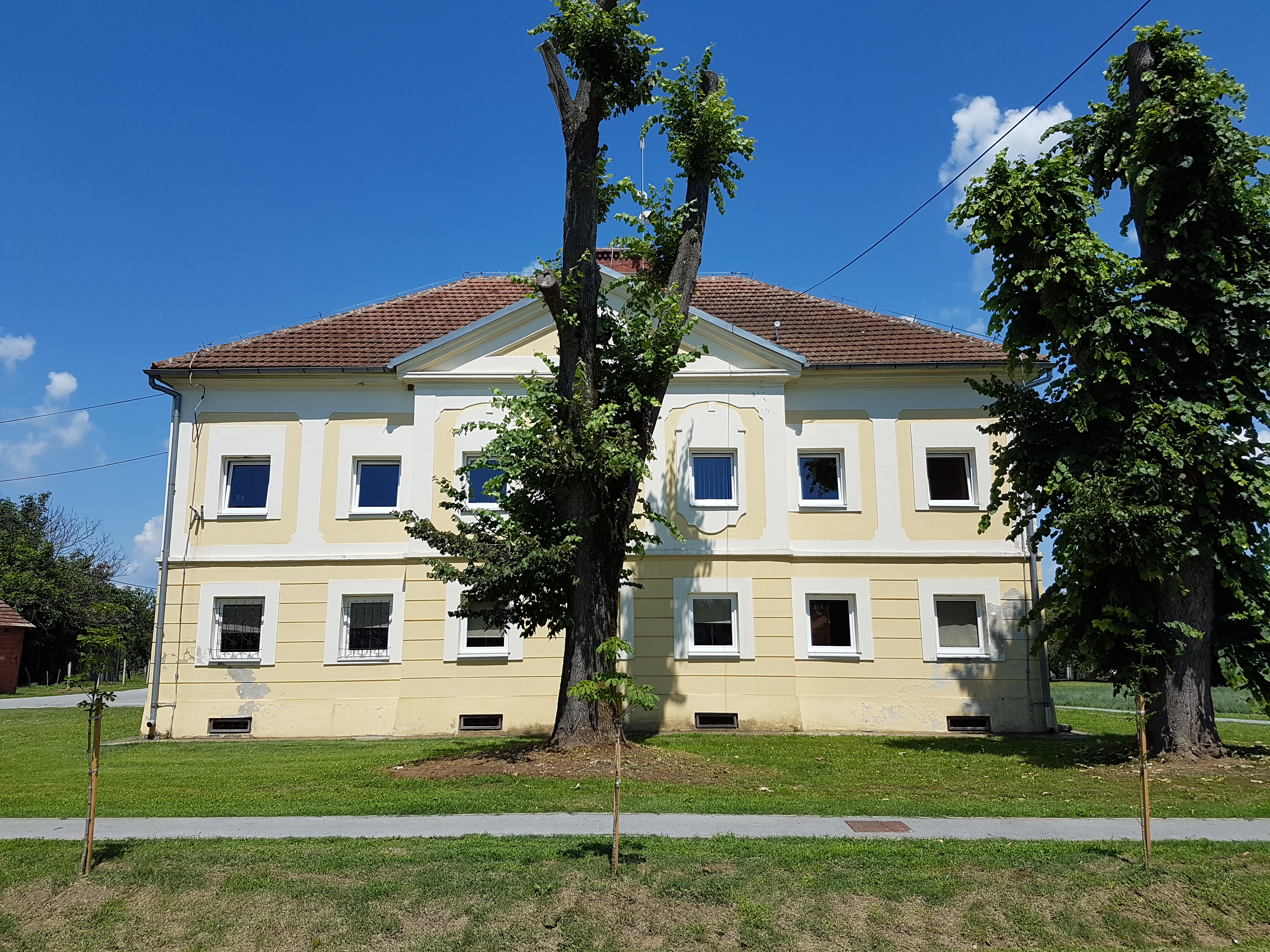
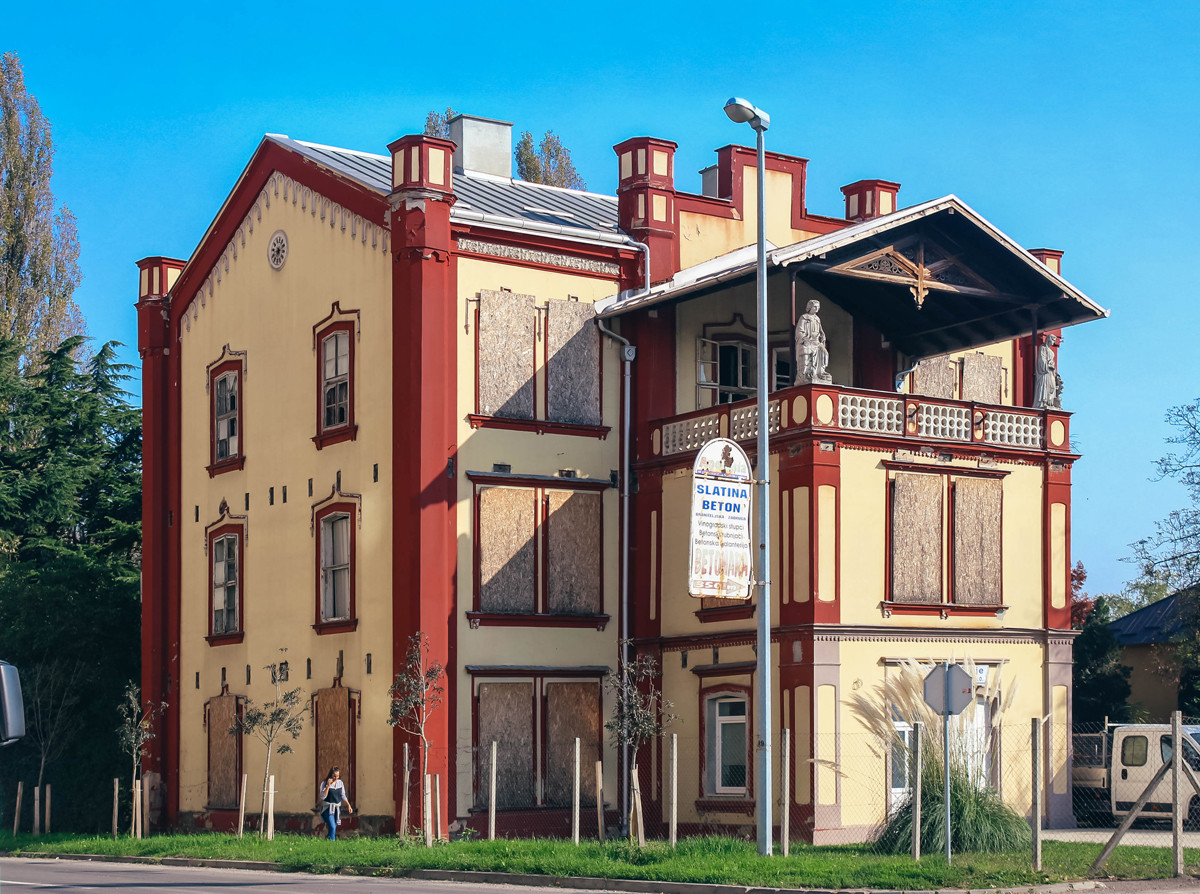

- Flag Coat of arms

- Virovitica-Podravina County within Croatia
- Country: Croatia
- County seat: Virovitica

Government
  - Župan (Prefect): Igor Andrović (HDZ)

Area
  - Total: 2,024 km^{2} (781 sq mi)

Population (2021)
  - Total: 70,660
  - Density: 34.91/km^{2} (90.42/sq mi)
- Area code: 033
- ISO 3166 code: HR-10
- HDI (2022): 0.818 very high · 21st
- Website: http://www.vpz.hr/

Virovitica-Podravina County (pronounced [ʋiroʋǐtit͡sa-pǒdraʋina]; Croatian: Virovitičko-podravska županija [ʋiroʋǐtit͡ʃko-pǒdraʋskaː ʒupǎnija]; Hungarian: Verőce-Drávamente megye) is a northern Slavonian county in Croatia. Its county seat is in Virovitica and it includes the area around the Drava river, Podravina being the Drava's drainage basin. Other notable towns are Slatina and Orahovica.

== Administrative division ==
Virovitica-Podravina County holds the following towns and districts:

=== Towns ===
City / town	Population	Area km^{2}	Website
Orahovica	5,304	123.9	orahovica.hr
Slatina	13,686		slatina.hr
Virovitica	21,291		virovitica.hr

=== Municipalities ===
Municipality	Population	Area km^{2}	Website
Crnac	1,456		
Čačinci	2,802		cacinci.hr
Čađavica	2,009		slatina.hr
Gradina	3,850		gradina.hr
Lukač	3,634		
Mikleuš	1,464		
Nova Bukovica	1,771		
Pitomača	10,059		pitomaca.hr
Sopje	2,320		sopje.hr
Suhopolje	6,683		suhopolje.hr
Špišić Bukovica	4,221		
Voćin	2,382		
Zdenci	1,904		opcina-zdenci.hr

== Demographics ==
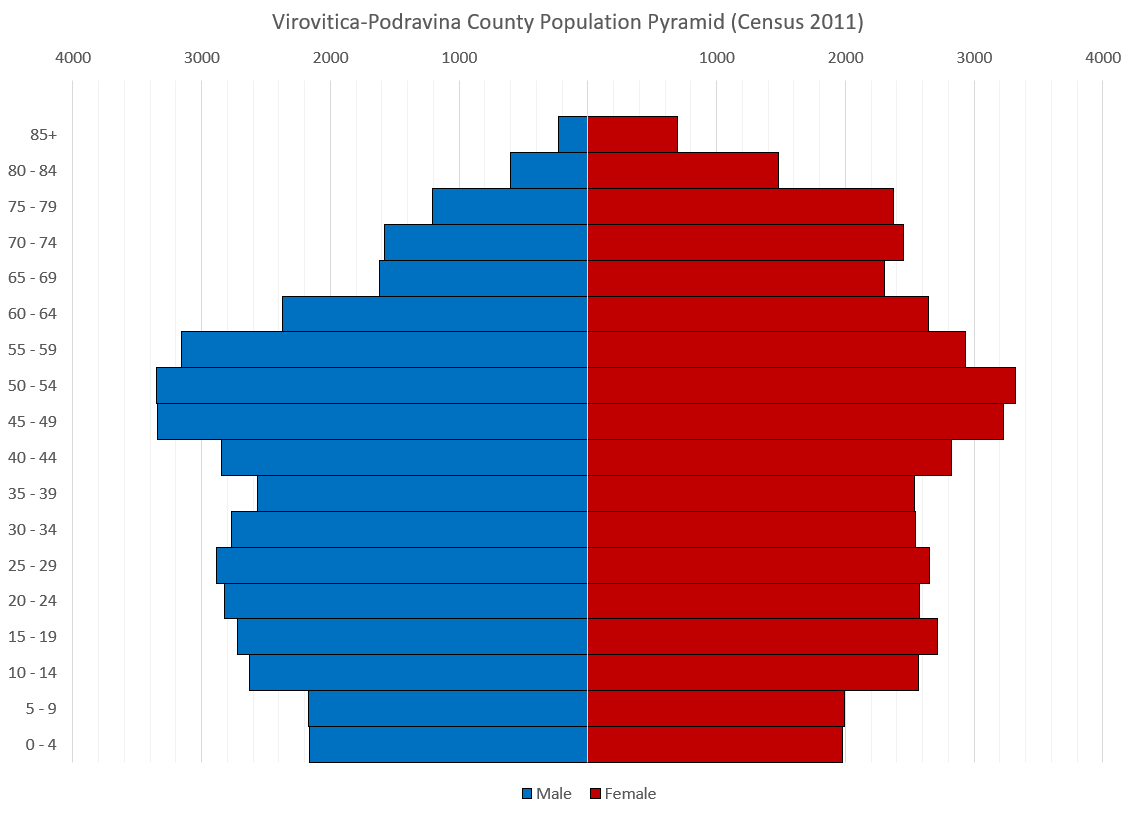
Population pyramid of Virovitica-Podravina County per 2011 Census.

Historical populations of Virovitica-Podravina County

Year	Pop.	±%
1857	57,107	—
1869	68,513	+20.0%
1880	69,225	+1.0%
1890	82,419	+19.1%
1900	90,266	+9.5%
1910	101,818	+12.8%
1921	102,824	+1.0%
1931	125,049	+21.6%
1948	125,372	+0.3%

Year	Pop.	±%
1953	131,517	+4.9%
1961	127,512	−3.0%
1971	116,314	−8.8%
1981	107,339	−7.7%
1991	104,625	−2.5%
2001	93,389	−10.7%
2011	84,836	−9.2%
2021	70,660	−16.7%

Source: Naselja i stanovništvo Republike Hrvatske 1857–2001, Croatian Bureau of Statistics, Zagreb, 2005

As of the 2011 census, the county had 84,836 residents. The population density is 42 people per km².

Virovitica-Podravina County: Population trends 1857–2021
v

population	57107	68513	69225	82419	90266	101818	102824	125049	125372	131517	127512	116314	107339	104625	93389	84836	70660
	1857	1869	1880	1890	1900	1910	1921	1931	1948	1953	1961	1971	1981	1991	2001	2011	2021

Sources: Croatian Bureau of Statistics publications

Ethnic Croats form the majority with 91.8% of the population, followed by Serbs at 6.0%.

== Politics ==
=== County Assembly ===
Following the 2025 Croatian local elections the Assembly of the Virovitica-Podravina County was composed of 31 elected representatives. Out of a total of 64,972 eligible voters 28,466 (43.81%) participated in the elections and 28,461 (43.81%) submitted their ballots. There were 27,285 (95.87%) valid and 1,176 (4.13%) invalid ballots.

The Croatian Democratic Union in coalition with Croatian Party of Pensioners got 16,928 (62.04%) ballots and 20 elected representatives. The Social Democratic Party of Croatia in coalition with Croatian Peasant Party and Croatian Party of State of Law got 6,924 ballots (25.37%) and 8 elected representatives. Coalition of Home and National Rally, The Bridge, Croatian Party of Rights, Croatian Sovereignists, Bloc Pensioners Together got 2,875 ballots (10.53%) and 3 elected representatives. The Independent Democratic Serb Party got 558 ballots (2.04%) which was under the threshold to enter into the assembly. As Serb minority achieved constitutionally required proportional representation on other lists which entered assembly, no additional elections were held as it was the case in some other counties.

Summary of the 2025 Croatian local elections
Party	Votes	%	Seats
Croatian Democratic Union; Croatian Party of Pensioners	16,928	62.04	20
Social Democratic Party of Croatia; Croatian Peasant Party; Croatian Party of State of Law	6,924	25.37	8
Home and National Rally; The Bridge; Croatian Party of Rights; Croatian Sovereignists; Bloc Pensioners Together	2,875	10.53	3
Independent Democratic Serb Party	558	2.04	0
Invalid/blank votes	1,176	4,13	—
Total	28,461	100	—
Registered voters/turnout	64,972	43.81	—
Source: (in Croatian)

=== Minority councils and representatives ===
Directly elected minority councils and representatives are tasked with consulting tasks for the local or regional authorities in which they are advocating for minority rights and interests, integration into public life and participation in the management of local affairs. At the 2023 Croatian national minorities councils and representatives elections Serbs of Croatia fulfilled legal requirements to elect 25 members minority council of the Virovitica-Podravina County while Albanians and Hungarians of Croatia were electing individual representatives. Some municipalities, towns or cities in the county elected their own local minority councils as well.
