= Operation Orada (1991) =

Operation during the Homeland war

- Part of the Croatian War of Independence and Operation Papuk-91
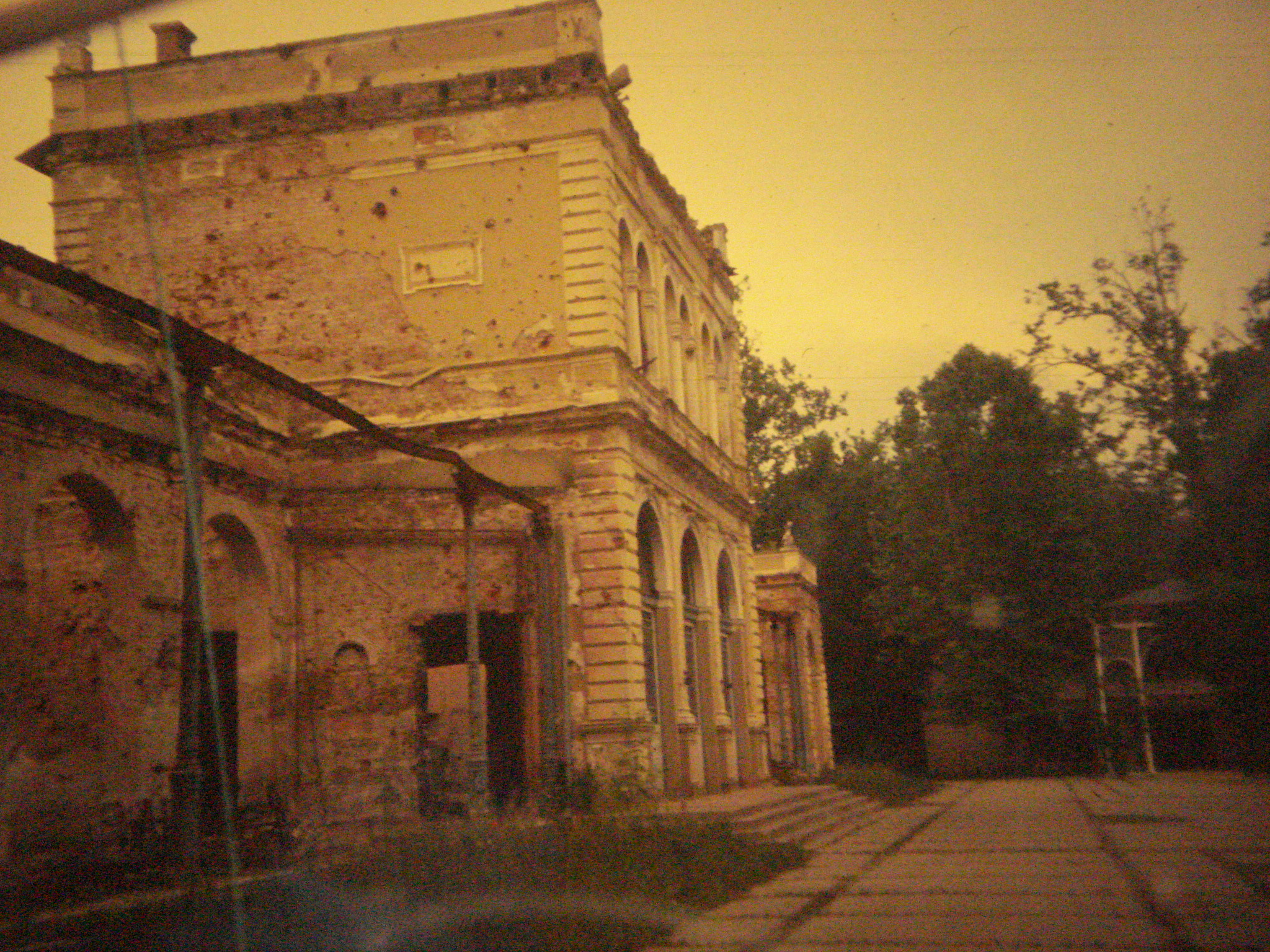
- Hotel Lipik destroyed during 1991 military operations
Date	5–8 December 1991
Location	Lipik and surrounding villages
Result	Croatian victory: Withdrawal of the JNA to the south of the Pakra River
Territorial changes	Liberation of Lipik, Kukunjevac, part of Pakrac and surrounding areas from Yugoslav and Serbian forces

Belligerents
(Socialist Federal Republic of Yugoslavia) Yugoslavia; SAO Western Slavonia	Croatia

Commanders and leaders
Unknown	(Croatia) Col. Josip Tomšić

Units involved
Yugoslav People's Army: 343rd Motorised Brigade; Two companies of the Territorial Defence of Donji Čaglić	(Croatia) Units of the Bjelovar Operational Zone

Strength
200	600+

Casualties and losses
	6 killed and 22 wounded

Operation Orada (Croatian: Operacija Orada), or the Orada Action, was a military operation conducted by the Croatian Army (HV) and the Special Police of the Ministry of Internal Affairs between 5 and 8 December 1991 to liberate the town of Lipik and its surroundings from Yugoslav forces.

== Background ==
On 28 November 1991 the Yugoslav People's Army (JNA), supported by Serbian militias, had occupied the entire town. Croatian forces were expelled from the town and retreated to Filipovac, where they re-established defensive positions. Preparations to retake the town then began.

By order of the General Staff of the HV, on 4 December 1991 attacks were planned along the axes Korita – Jagma – Lipik and Gornja Subocka – Donja Subocka – Donji Čaglić with the objective of cutting the Okučani–Lipik communications line.

On 4 December the 1st and 117th Brigades launched attacks to apply pressure to the western flank of JNA and Serbian forces in Lipik. By 7 December Yugoslav and Serbian forces were pushed out of Korita and withdrew to the villages of Jagma and Donja Subocka.

Simultaneously, on 5 December Croatian forces launched Operation Orada to retake the town of Lipik and the nearby villages (Dobrovac, Kukunjevac, Korita, Jagma and Subocka).

== Order of battle ==
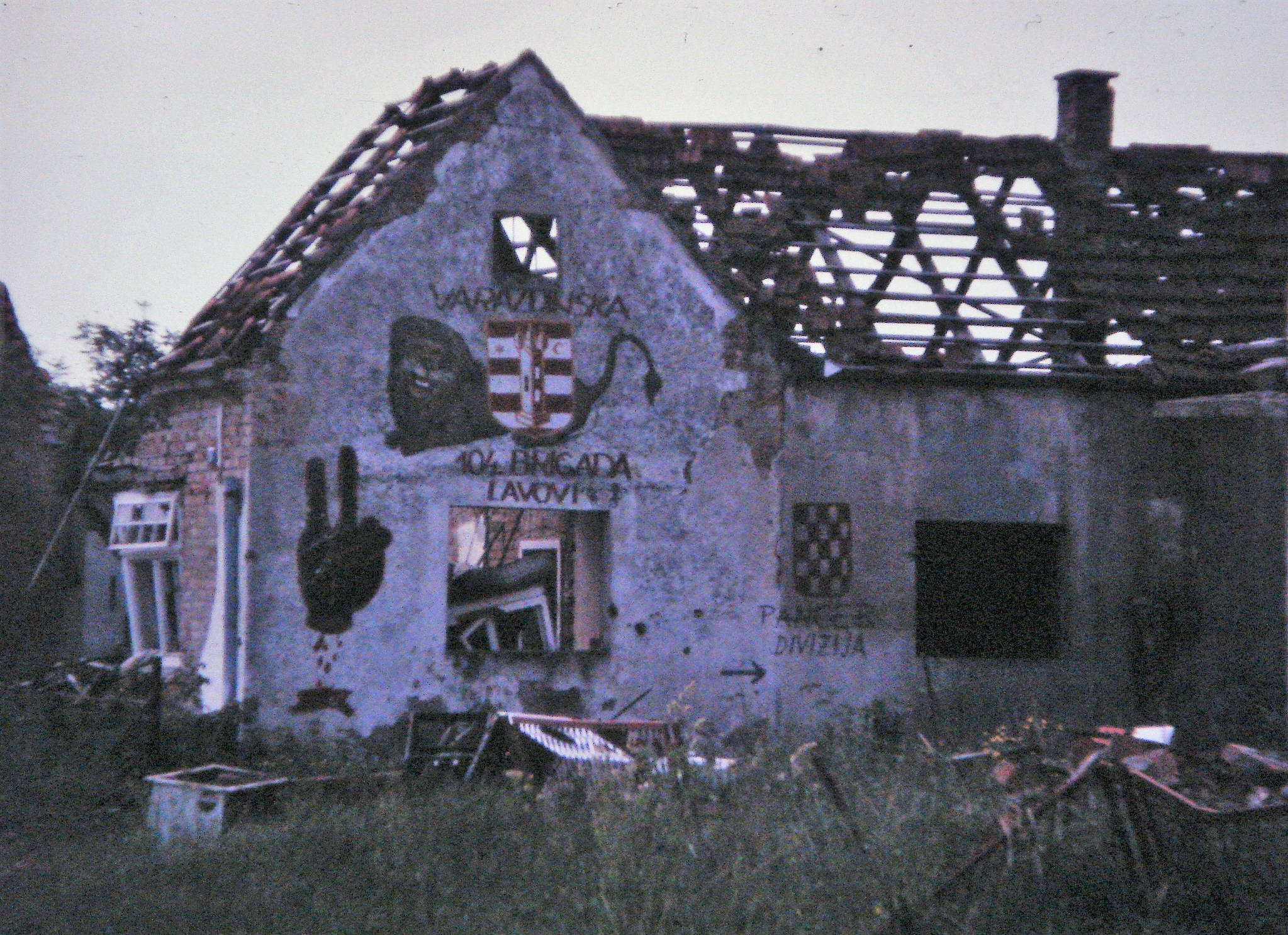
Wall with references to the 104th Varaždin Brigade (Croatian Army). Located west of the road between Lipik and Donji Čaglić, near the bridge over the Pakra River. Photo from August 1994.

=== Croatian forces ===
As part of Operation Papuk-91, Orada was the responsibility of the Bjelovar Operational Zone.

The main axis of attack was to be from Klisa and Filipovac (Tabor Street) toward Lipik, with secondary axes from Klisa, Toranj, Batinjani, Mali Banovac and Brezine toward Dobrovac and Kukunjevac. In total some 600 members of the Army and Special Police participated in the assault (300 directed at Lipik), supported by tanks and artillery.

Participating Croatian units included:

- 1st Company of the 76th Independent Battalion (Pakrac) on the Filipovac–Lipik axis (right wing of the attack), supported by seven tanks and an infantry vehicle from the 105th Brigade on the Prekopakra – Height 160 – Lipik direction.
- one company of the Special Police (MUP) from Poljana and a police section from Zabok on the western Filipovac–Lipik axis.
- 1st Company of the 54th Independent Battalion (Čakovec) and Lipik police from the east of Filipovac toward Lipik (left wing).
- elements of the 104th Brigade Varaždin to take positions in the Krndija forest securing the Dereza and Kusonje direction. The Pakrac police, remainder of the 104th Brigade and the 76th Independent Battalion (which did not take part in the offensive) were to defend Pakrac from actions originating from Gavrinica.
- elements of the 104th Brigade to occupy the village of Klisa.
- elements of the 3rd Battalion of the 117th Brigade (Križevci) to advance through the Turkovača woods toward Sklizavac – Kukunjevac – Dobrovac.
- elements of the 73rd Independent Battalion (Garešnica) together with elements of the 56th Independent Battalion (Kutina) in the Brezine – Kukunjevac direction.
- artillery support: an independent 122 mm howitzer battery in Mali Banovac.

=== Yugoslav and Serb forces ===
Defending forces comprised two companies of the Territorial Defence of Donji Čaglić (companies Ćibric and Bodegraj) and elements of the JNA 343rd Motorised Brigade. The garrison in Lipik was estimated at 200 personnel with artillery support and two tanks. Members of the Laktaši TO detachment (Bosnia) were also present.

Defending troops flew the Yugoslav flag in the town.

== The operation ==
=== 5 December ===
The Croatian offensive began on 5 December 1991 at 10:00 with an artillery preparation followed by an armoured and infantry assault from Klisa and Filipovac. Due to strong resistance and the use of anti-tank missiles (two tanks and one APC were damaged), armoured elements withdrew while infantry reached the northern suburbs of Lipik.

In the afternoon MUP elements entered parts of Lipik, and other Croatian units took positions north of the town. According to the Pakrac Sector Command plan, that day elements of the 104th Brigade were to occupy Klisa, but they did so only the following day.

On secondary axes, the 3rd Battalion of the 117th Brigade successfully crossed the Turkovača forest and reached the villages of Sklizavac and Smrtići north of Kukunjevac, where their advance was halted by JNA/Serbian tanks. From the Brezine direction, elements of the 73rd Battalion reached the first houses in Kukunjevac. From the Gaj direction toward Kukunjevac, elements of the 54th Battalion also advanced and remained in the first houses of Kukunjevac overnight.

Although Croatian forces did not capture Lipik and its immediate surroundings that day, Yugoslav and Serbian forces found themselves in a critical situation. That night JNA troops withdrew from the town to Donji Čaglić, leaving only two Territorial Defence companies behind.

Following the setback, Croatian units pulled back to their start positions to prepare for the next morning's attack. Approximately 30 men of the 1st Company of the 76th Battalion maintained contact during the night.

=== 6 December ===
At 08:00 a Croatian artillery preparation for the continuation of the attack on Lipik, Dobrovac and Kukunjevac commenced, followed by infantry and armoured advances at 09:00.

Serbian defenders, numbering roughly 180, occupied a position near the cemetery. Croats attacked along four directions:

- (left wing) From Filipovac along the road linking Pakrac and Lipik (Lipik Street) and the town's main street (Maria Theresa Street). Led by the MUP.
- (centre-left) From Filipovac: Filipovac – Nikola Tesla Street. Led by 1st Company of the 54th Independent Battalion (Čakovec) and MUP.
- (centre-right) From Prekopakra – north of Filipovac – cemetery. Employed a section of the MUP.
- (right wing) Prekopakra – Height 160 – Lipik. MUP and five tanks which were attacked by anti-tank helicopters. This wing joined with the 1st Company of the 76th Battalion that had maintained contact overnight. It penetrated to the glassworks in the depth of the attack, where it established a perimeter defence and opened fire toward Subocka and Donji Čaglić, forcing Serbian troops and tanks to withdraw toward the latter along the railway line.

Croatian forces entered central Lipik at midday, with armoured units and the 1st Company of the 76th Independent Battalion. In the afternoon elements of the 54th Independent Battalion also entered the town, and at night elements of the 104th Brigade were introduced to strengthen the town's defence.

Following the liberation of Lipik, Serbian forces in Kukunjevac and Dobrovac became isolated and were in a difficult position. Elements of the 3rd Battalion of the 117th Brigade managed to capture the village of Smrtic at 10:00, but other parts of the unit were pushed back from a position near Dobrovac toward Klisa under JNA artillery fire.

As a consequence of the 343rd Brigade's withdrawal, the command of the JNA 5th Corps moved the 122nd Light Brigade from Gornji Varoš – Uskoci to the area of Japaga, Kovačevac Čaglićki and Radjenovci.

=== 7 December ===
On 7 December strong pressure from the west forced the JNA to abandon Gornja and Donja Subocka in the face of the advance of the Croatian 1st Guards Brigade ("Tigers"). This also prompted Serbian militias to withdraw.

In parts of southern Lipik Serb rearguards remained that impeded consolidation of the previous day's gains. That day the MUP and the 1st Company of the 54th Independent Battalion (Čakovec) were withdrawn from Lipik. They were replaced by a company of the 104th Brigade (Varaždin) and a company of the 76th Battalion.

Elsewhere Croatian forces continued operations from Lipik and Kukunjevac to liberate the village of Dobrovac, which by 11:00 was cleared of Serbian forces. The attack included a company of the 117th Brigade repeating the assault from 5 December.

=== 8 December ===
On 8 December Kukunjevac was completely liberated, bringing Operation Orada to an end.

== Casualties ==
During Operation Orada in Lipik, Kukunjevac and Dobrovac five members of the MUP and one member of the 3rd Battalion of the 117th Brigade were killed, while 22 Croatian personnel were wounded.

== Aftermath and subsequent operations ==
On the night of 7–8 December the Croatian 1st Guards Brigade regrouped and on the morning of 8 December launched an attack on Jagma. After five hours of fighting the village was captured and Yugoslav/Serb forces withdrew to Gornja Subocka. From Jagma – Livađani – Kričke Croatian forces launched a general offensive along the front line. The 1st Guards Brigade defeated enemy forces in Gornja and Donja Subocka and Kričke on 9 December.

After 9 December 1991 the focus of fighting shifted to Pakrac, where 20 days of combat continued until 29 December when the ill-fated Action Alfa concluded. Croatian forces exploited the initiative around Pakrac area; on 11 December 1991 measures were taken to retake occupied parts of Pakrac.
