= Operation Hurricane-91 =

Croatian War of Independence battle

Coordinates: 45°16′N 17°12′E

- Part of the Croatian War of Independence
- Western Slavonian towns on the map of Croatia. JNA-held area in late December 1991 is highlighted red.
Date	29 October 1991 – 3 January 1992
Location	Western Slavonia, Croatia
Result	Croatian victory

Belligerents
Croatia	Yugoslavia; SAO Western Slavonia

Commanders and leaders
(Croatia) Rudi Stipčić	(Socialist Federal Republic of Yugoslavia) Nikola Uzelac

Units involved
Croatian National Guard (to 3 November); Armed Forces of Croatia (from 3 November): Croatian Army	Yugoslav People's Army: Yugoslav Ground Forces; 5th Banja Luka Corps; 2nd Krajina Brigade; Western Slavonia Territorial Defense

Strength
14,758 troops	c. 13,500 troops

Casualties and losses
184 dead and 595 wounded 1 MIA; 25 POWs	516 killed and wounded 17 tanks, 3 APCs, 20 artillery pieces, 1 aircraft destroyed

Operation Hurricane-91 (Croatian: Operacija Orkan-91) was a military offensive undertaken by the Croatian Army (Hrvatska vojska – HV) against the Yugoslav People's Army (Jugoslovenska Narodna Armija – JNA) and SAO Western Slavonia Territorial Defense Forces in the Sava River valley, in the region of Western Slavonia during the Croatian War of Independence. The operation began on 29 October 1991 and ended on 3 January 1992 when a nationwide ceasefire was signed to implement the Vance plan. The offensive was aimed at recapturing the region, in conjunction with two other HV offensives launched against SAO Western Slavonia in the north of the region within days.

Even though the offensive captured a portion of the targeted area, including the town of Lipik as the first of the larger settlements captured by the HV during the war, the mission objectives were not met before the ceasefire took effect. SAO Western Slavonia retained control of the town of Okučani and its surroundings, including a short section of the Zagreb–Slavonski Brod motorway. The halting of Operation Hurricane-91 due to the ceasefire of 3 January 1992 led to opposing assessments on the possible outcomes of the offensive had there been no ceasefire. Assessments range from claims that the JNA was on the brink of defeat in the area, to estimates that the HV was too exhausted and its ammunition stocks too low to permit a successful conclusion of the offensive. The three HV offensives launched in Western Slavonia in late 1991 led to the displacement of approximately 20,000 Croatian Serb refugees who were later settled in the JNA-held Baranja region in eastern Croatia.

== Background ==
Within the 1991 Yugoslav campaign in Croatia, the 5th (Banja Luka) Corps of the Yugoslav People's Army (Jugoslovenska Narodna Armija – JNA) was tasked with advancing north through the Western Slavonia region, from Okučani to Daruvar and Virovitica, and with a secondary drive from Okučani towards Kutina. This task was essentially consistent with the line expected to be reached by the main thrust of the JNA advancing from the Eastern Slavonia in about a week. The linkup was designed to facilitate a further advance west to Zagreb and Varaždin. The Corps had already deployed a battlegroup of the 265th Mechanised Brigade near Okučani to support the advance that started on 21 September, and reached the Papuk Mountains. The corps received two motorised and one artillery brigades as reinforcements during the advance, but the problems with morale and desertions experienced by the JNA elsewhere were also present in the Banja Luka Corps.

The JNA was stopped by the Croatian National Guard (Zbor Narodne Garde – ZNG) between Novska, Nova Gradiška and Pakrac, even though SAO Western Slavonia Territorial Defense Forces (Teritorijalna odbrana – TO) units took positions on the Bilogora and Papuk north of Pakrac, near Virovitica and Slatina with no JNA support. Capture of Ivanovo Selo, seven kilometres (4.3 miles) east of Grubišno Polje and eight kilometres (5.0 miles) north of Daruvar on 21 September marked the territorial peak of the TO-held area on the Bilogora. The village was recaptured by the ZNG the same day at a cost of 7 dead and 15 wounded.

On 1 October, the Banja Luka Corps initiated probing attacks in the region, presaging a major effort employing the bulk of the corps three days later. The advance established defensive positions just outside Novska and Nova Gradiška. On 6 October, Pakrac was briefly isolated when the JNA captured Batinjani four kilometres (2.5 miles) northwest of the town, interdicting the last road available for supply of Pakrac. The ZNG recaptured the village the same day and drove the JNA back six kilometres (3.7 miles), but it sustained 22 killed in the action. The JNA captured Jasenovac on 8 October. Lipik and a part of Pakrac were captured four days later. By that time the JNA offensive in Western Slavonia had lost its momentum, and the ZNG made minor advances north of Novska and west of Nova Gradiška on 13 and 16 October. The Croatian authorities considered that the war situation was no longer critical. This assessment was followed by an order to prepare and implement plans for a counter-offensive on 15 October.

== Order of battle ==
Map of western Slavonia (Modern county lines provided for reference)

The ZNG units in the areas of Novska and Nova Gradiška, east and west of JNA-held Okučani, were subordinated to Posavina Operational Group (OG), commanded by Colonel Rudi Stipčić. The Posavina OG commanded 14,758 troops. Besides the 125th Infantry Brigade, raised in Novska, the units deployed around Novska, west of JNA-held Okučani, were the 1st Guards Brigade, the 117th Infantry Brigade, the 56th Independent Battalion, and the 65th Independent Battalion. The 15th Mixed Antitank Artillery Regiment was also deployed to the Posavina OG area of responsibility (AOR). The Novska axis of the Posavina OG was reinforced in November by addition of the 151st Infantry Brigade, the 1st Battalion of the 153rd Infantry Brigade, the 51st Independent Battalion, and the 53rd Independent Battalion. In the area of Nova Gradiška, the ZNG deployed the 121st Infantry Brigade, elements of the 108th Infantry Brigade, elements of the 99th Infantry Brigade, relatively small detachments temporarily removed from the 1st and the 3rd Guards Brigades, and the 1st Battalion of the 149th Infantry Brigade. The 104th Infantry Brigade and the 105th Infantry Brigade were deployed north of the Posavina OG, in the area of Pakrac.

The combined JNA and TO forces deployed opposite the Posavina OG comprised approximately 13,500 troops, subordinated to the JNA 5th (Banja Luka) Corps. In the area, the corps had at its disposal a battlegroup of the 265th Mechanised Brigade, the 6th and the 10th Partisan Brigades, and the 16th Motorised Brigade, supported by the SAO Western Slavonia TO. In the second half of December, the Banja Luka Corps was reinforced by the addition of three motorised battalions and an armoured battalion, drawn from the 84th Motorised Brigade (from Bitola), and the 125th Motorised Brigade (from Titova Mitrovica). In addition, the 134th Light Infantry Brigade was brought in as a reinforcement from Titovo Užice on 31 December. The corps was under the command of Lieutenant Colonel General Nikola Uzelac.

== Timeline ==
The objectives of Operation Hurricane-91 were to secure Croatian international border at the Sava River south of Okučani and recapture territory held by the JNA and the TO in the area between Pakrac, Nova Gradiška and Novska, as well as in the area of Jasenovac. The HV was also tasked with interdicting the Okučani–Lipik road. The offensive began on 29 October, when the ZNG captured the village of Bair, five kilometres (3.1 miles) northeast of Novska. On that day alone, 28 ZNG troops were killed. Two days later, the ZNG launched Operation Swath-10 against the northern portion of the TO-held portion of Western Slavonia, and a follow-up attack on 10–12 December. On 3 November, the ZNG was renamed the Croatian Army (Hrvatska vojska – HV).

=== Novska–Lipik area ===
Operation Hurricane-91 made little progress by mid-November, when the HV made very modest advances, amounting to several hundred metres towards the villages of Medari and Gorice, approximately seven kilometres (4.3 miles) west of Nova Gradiška. Bair changed hands twice more by 15 November. The same day, the HV captured the village of Popovac Subocki, and the following day it captured the villages of Brezovac and Livađani—all situated in the area between Bair and Lipik. On 18 November, the HV improved its position in the region by capturing the village of Lovska, four kilometres (2.5 miles) north of Bair, and again the next day after it captured the Trokut Motel on the Novska–Lipik road. On 28 November, the HV launched Operation Papuk-91, targeting the area north of Pakrac, adjacent to the AOR assigned to the Posavina OG.

Efforts of the Posavina OG in the Novska–Lipik area were supported by HV units and special police subordinated to the Pakrac Operational Group (OG). On 5 December at 10 am, the Pakrac OG attacked TO and JNA positions in Lipik, about four kilometres (2.5 miles) southwest of Pakrac, and the villages of Dobrovac and Kukunjevac to the west of Lipik, situated along the Novska–Lipik road. The Croatian special police entered Lipik that afternoon, but the town was not brought under full control until 11 am the following day when the HV also captured Kukunjevac. On 7 December the Pakrac OG captured Dobrovac, while the Posavina OG units advanced from Bair towards Dobrovac, capturing the village of Korita. The two operational groups linked up in the Novska–Lipik area as the HV captured Jagma on 8 December and the villages of Subocka and Gornje Kričke on 9 December. On 10–13 December, the HV launched an unsuccessful attack aimed at capturing a portion of Pakrac which remained under control of the JNA.

=== Nova Gradiška area ===
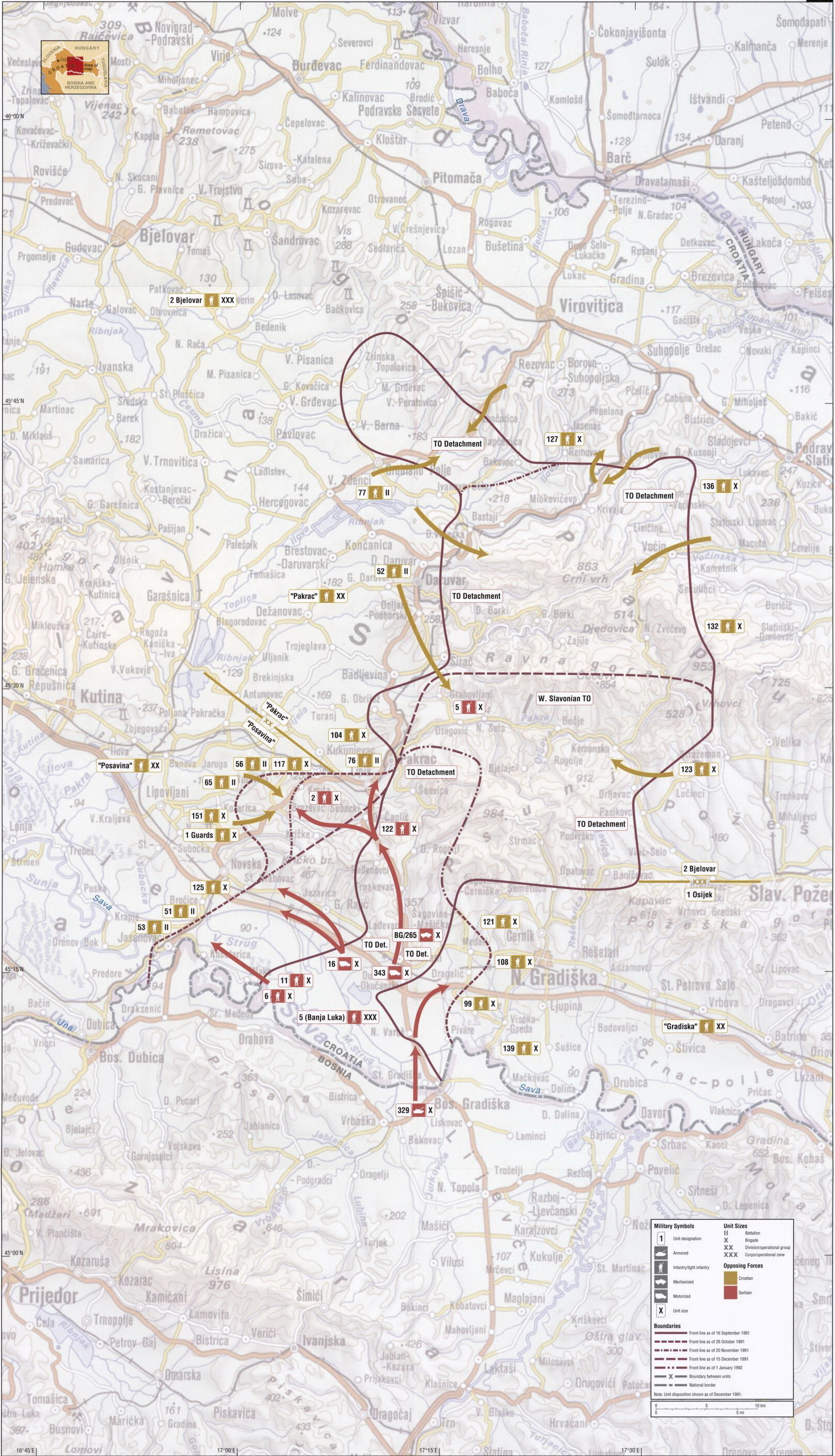
Map showing the fighting in Western Slavonia, September 1991 – January 1992; Area affected by Operation Hurricane-91 is situated in the lower portion of the map

Within Operation Papuk-91, the HV advanced onto the Psunj Mountain area north of Nova Gradiška in an effort codenamed Gradina, capturing the villages of Šnjegavić, Sinlije, Golobrdac, Vučjak Čečavski, Ruševac, Jeminovac, Čečavac and Opršinac on 10 December. The advance improved the safety of the Nova Gradiška–Požega road and secured the right flank of the Nova Gradiška axis of the operation. On 12 December, the HV intercepted and captured a reconnaissance–sabotage group near the village of Cernička Šagovina, seven kilometres (4.3 miles) northwest of Nova Gradiška.

On 19 December, the HV captured the village of Mašićka Šagovina on the southern slopes of Psunj, advancing west towards the Okučani–Lipik road by about three kilometres (1.9 miles). The HV sustained significant losses in fighting to take control of the village from the White Eagles paramilitaries—13 killed and about 20 wounded soldiers. In the 1990s in Serbia, there were reports of a mass killing of Serbian civilians during the capture of Mašićka Šagovina. On 22 December, the General Staff of the Armed Forces of the Republic of Croatia requested the Osijek Operational Zone to prepare three brigades for possible deployment as reinforcements in Operation Hurricane-91. The request was prompted by information that the JNA reinforced a day earlier, receiving additional 36 M-84 and 28 T-55 tanks, 20 artillery pieces and 800 troops. On 23 December, the HV made a poorly coordinated attempt to capture the village of Trnava, halfway between Nova Gradiška and Okučani. The attack was not successful, but the defending force withdrew the next day.

=== Okučani–Pakrac area ===
Even though Croatian President Franjo Tuđman called off the offensive on 26 December under international pressure, the fighting continued. The JNA counterattacked in the plains along the Sava River on 26 December. The counterattack was sustained until 3 January 1992, inflicting HV heavy casualties.

As the Operation Papuk-91 completed, the HV units subordinated to the Pakrac OG advanced to the villages of Kraguj, Japaga and Šeovica on 26–27 December 1991, outflanking the southern parts of Pakrac held by the JNA and the TO. The JNA employed the reinforcements it received to counter the threat. On 28 December, the JNA recaptured the two villages and threatened the Pakrac–Požega road. The same day, the HV retreated from Kraguj to the village of Kusonje to defend the road. On 29 December, the 127th Infantry Brigade suffered a loss of 12 killed or captured as it performed reconnaissance of positions held by the JNA and the TO on the Psunj Mountain, in the villages of Brusnik and Lipovac. The unit failed to advance later on.

On 30 December, the HV launched sub-operation Širinci '92 west of Nova Gradiška. The HV briefly captured the village of Širinci, advancing west from Mašićka Šagovina and moving within four kilometres (2.5 miles) of the Okučani–Lipik road. The JNA quickly pushed the HV out of Širinci the same day. West of Pakrac, the HV successfully defended Kusonje against a fresh attack and continued a mop-up along the Pakrac–Požega road, capturing the village of Prgomelje near Pakrac the same day. On 3 January 1992, the HV unsuccessfully tried to advance to the village of Donja Šumetlica, south of the road. It managed to recapture Širinci just before a general ceasefire negotiated to implement the Vance plan came into effect that day, and further offensive activities were halted.

== Aftermath ==
In Operation Hurricane-91, the HV sustained a loss of 184 dead, 595 wounded, while 25 soldiers were captured by the JNA as prisoners of war and one went missing in action. The HV captured a total of 720 square kilometres (280 square miles) of Western Slavonia—370 square kilometres (140 square miles) around Novska and 350 square kilometres (140 square miles) around Nova Gradiška containing 28 settlements. The JNA and the forces supporting it in the area suffered a loss of 516 killed and wounded. Furthermore, the JNA lost seventeen tanks, three armoured personnel carriers, seventeen other vehicles, two howitzers, four recoilless guns, six mortars, four anti-aircraft guns, and 1 aircraft. Three HV offensives in Western Slavonia conducted in late 1991—Operations Hurricane-10, Swath-10, and Papuk-91—created a total of 20,000 Serb refugees. They fled from the area when the JNA ordered the Croatian Serb forces to withdraw, and were subsequently settled in the JNA-held Baranja region in eastern Croatia. The resettlement of the refugees coincided with Croatian Serb efforts to change ethnic composition of the area along the Danube seized in late 1991 and provided a secondary motivation for expulsion of non-Serb civilians there.

The HV failed to meet its objectives. This is attributed to several factors, including fatigue caused by the prolonged fighting while the units committed to the battle were not cycled to allow them rest. Furthermore, the HV was confronted with a shortage of ammunition (especially artillery munitions), poor intelligence on the opposing forces, and inadequate communication systems. Breakdown of the communications system forced the HV to rely primarily on runners to transmit information. The offensive was punctuated by numerous local ceasefires, slowing down its progress, already made difficult by cold weather as the air temperature dropped to −15 °C (5 °F). Ultimately, the comprehensive ceasefire was agreed, halting all fighting in Croatia. It came into force at 6 pm, on 3 January 1992. There are opposing views on a possible outcome of the offensive had there been no ceasefire implemented on 3 January. Some sources claim the JNA forces in the region were on the brink of defeat, while others dispute this. Approximately 600 square kilometres (230 square miles) of Western Slavonia around Okučani remained outside HV control. The area, containing a portion of the Zagreb–Slavonski Brod motorway between the villages of Paklenica and Dragalić, was captured by the HV in Operation Flash in May 1995.

Some sources conflate Operation Hurricane-91 and elements of Operation Papuk-91, presenting the latter as a part of Operation Hurricane-91, specifically including the December 1991 advance of the 123rd Infantry Brigade made on the northeastern slopes of the Psunj mountain. Operation Hurricane-91 is commemorated annually at the site of the Trokut Motel north of Novska, where a monument listing names of 314 Croatian troops killed in defence of Novska throughout the war is located. Operations Swath-10, Papuk-91, and Hurricane-91, executed in Western Slavonia in late 1991, are considered to be the first Croatian offensive operations of liberation in the Croatian War of Independence.

The ceasefire of 3 January allowed implementation of the Vance plan, which provided for the protection of civilians in specific areas designated as UN Protected Areas (UNPAs) and deployment of UN peacekeepers in Croatia. One of the UNPAs defined by the plan, UNPA Western Slavonia, encompassed parts of the municipalities of Novska and Nova Gradiška, as well as the entire municipalities of Daruvar, Grubišno Polje and Pakrac. Thus the UNPA covered the area held by the JNA on 3 January, additional territory to the north, recaptured by the HV in late 1991, and towns which never came under SAO Western Slavonia control—such as Grubišno Polje and Daruvar. The peacekeeping force named United Nations Protection Force (UNPROFOR), initially expected to be 10,000-strong, started to deploy on 8 March.
