= Daruvar Agreement =

Document negotiated by Croatian and Republic of Serbian Krajina

- UNPA Western Slavonia/Sector West (shaded green) on a map of Croatia. Other UNPAs/sectors are shaded red, blue and purple.
- Signed: 18 February 1993
- Location: Daruvar, Croatia
- Mediators: Gerard Fischer
- Signatories: Veljko Džakula, Dušan Ećimović, Milan Vlaisavljević, Mladen Kulić, Đorđe Lovrić and Milan Radaković for the RSK; Zlatko Kos, Zdravko Sokić, Ivan Volf, Vladimir Delač and Želimir Malnar for Croatia
- Parties: Croatia Republic of Serbian Krajina

The Daruvar Agreement (Serbo-Croatian: Daruvarski sporazum) was a document negotiated by Croatian and Republic of Serbian Krajina (RSK) local authorities in the United Nations Protected Area (UNPA) for the SAO Western Slavonia, also known as Sector West on 18 February 1993, during the Croatian War of Independence. The agreement provided for the improvement of water and electrical power supply, the return of refugees to their homes and the opening of transport routes spanning Sector West and connecting Croatian Army-controlled areas near towns of Nova Gradiška and Novska. It also provided a framework for the further improvement of living conditions of the population both in the Croatian- and RSK-controlled portions of Sector West. The agreement was named after Daruvar, the site of its signing.

The Daruvar Agreement, mediated by the head of the United Nations (UN) Civil Affairs in Sector West Gerard Fischer, was negotiated in secrecy. When the central RSK authorities in Knin learned of the arrangement, the signatories on behalf of the RSK were sacked from their official posts and arrested. The agreement itself was labeled as treasonous by the central RSK authorities. Fischer and other UN officials, who were involved in mediation of the agreement, were criticised by the UN for being excessively assertive in the matter. Fischer soon left the area.

== Background ==
In November, Croatia, Serbia and the Yugoslav People's Army (Jugoslovenska Narodna Armija – JNA) agreed upon the Vance plan, designed to halt combat operations in the Croatian War of Independence and allow the negotiation of a political settlement. Besides the ceasefire, the plan entailed protection of civilians in specific areas, designated as United Nations Protected Areas (UNPAs), and UN peacekeepers in Croatia—United Nations Protection Force (UNPROFOR). The ceasefire came into effect on 3 January 1992. Shortly after the Vance plan was accepted, the European Community announced its decision to grant diplomatic recognition to Croatia on 15 January 1992, while the Serb- and JNA-held areas within Croatia were organised as the Republic of Serbian Krajina (RSK).

Despite the Geneva Accord requiring an immediate withdrawal of JNA personnel and equipment from Croatia, the JNA stayed behind for seven to eight months. When its troops eventually pulled out, JNA left their equipment to the RSK. As a consequence of organisational problems and breaches of ceasefire, the UNPROFOR, did not start to deploy until 8 March. The UNPROFOR took two months to fully assemble in the UNPAs. The UNPROFOR was tasked with demilitarisation of the UNPAs, ceasefire maintenance, monitoring of local police and creating conditions for return of internally displaced persons and refugees. Those comprised more than 300,000 Croats who were exiled from the RSK-controlled territory, and 20,000 Serbs who fled the areas of western Slavonia captured by the Croatian Army (Hrvatska vojska – HV) in Operations Swath-10, Papuk-91 and Hurricane-91 in late 1991.

A part of western Slavonia, encompassing an area extending approximately 90 by 45 kilometres (56 by 28 miles), was designated as the UNPA of Western Slavonia or Sector West by the peace plan. Unlike other UNPAs, the RSK controlled only a part of the area—approximately a third of the UNPA located in the south—centred on the town of Okučani. The RSK-held area included a section of the Zagreb–Belgrade motorway. The UNPROFOR deployed to Sector West thought the HV would attack the area to control the motorway. In response, the UNPROFOR developed Operation Backstop aimed at defending against the HV attack, assuming that its main axis would be aligned with the motorway.

== Cooperation schemes ==
Division of Sector West into Croatian- and RSK-controlled areas fragmented the market for locally grown agricultural produce, and produce processing plants were rendered inaccessible to most farmers. Furthermore, the RSK-controlled area of Sector West suffered from severe shortage of fuel and electricity, while the Croatian-held Pakrac was cut off from water supply systems fed by springs in the RSK-held area to the south of the town. The situation led the head of the UN Civil Affairs in Sector West, Gerard Fischer, and Argentine General Carlos Maria Zabala, commanding officer of the UNPROFOR in Sector West, to propose a degree of cooperation between local authorities on both sides in the area.

Their efforts resulted in a scheme where grain crops grown in the RSK-held part of Sector West were milled in the Croatian-controlled areas, and the supply of potable water to Pakrac was exchanged for electricity supplied from Croatia to the southern portion of Sector West. Fischer also obtained approval for the limited return of refugees from local authorities. The scheme involved up to 2,500 refugees who would be allowed to rebuild their homes, funded by the Austrian government. The funds, in the amount of 1.3 million dollars, were obtained through Michael Platzer, Special Assistant to the Director-General of the United Nations Office at Vienna.

=== Formal agreement ===
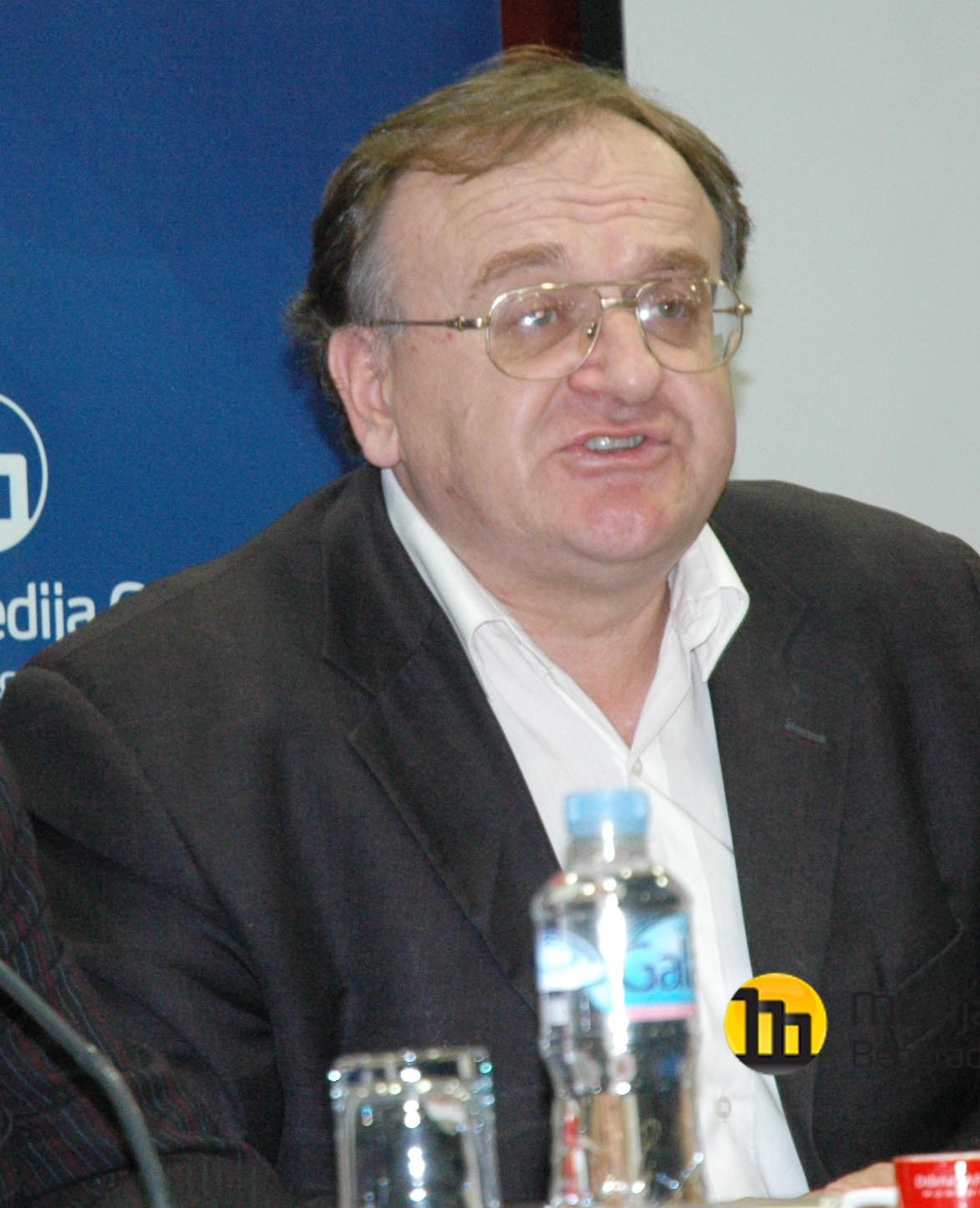
Veljko Džakula, a signatory of the Daruvar Agreement

Fischer attempted to gain wider support for the cooperation schemes already in place and extend their scope in Sector West. Fischer also assured the local authorities of the RSK that such a move would prevent renewed fighting in the area. The result of Fischer's efforts was the Daruvar Agreement. The agreement, signed in Daruvar on 18 February, encompassed the reconstruction of water and electrical power supply networks, the reopening of the Zagreb–Belgrade motorway section in Sector West for non-commercial traffic, the facilitation of the Novska–Nova Gradiška railway, the repair of telecommunication lines, the establishment of a joint commission tasked with normalisation of living conditions in Sector West, the return of all refugees to their homes, the access to property owned by civilians across the ceasefire line, and further meetings with local authorities to discuss further cooperation.

On behalf of the RSK local authorities, the agreement was signed by Veljko Džakula, Dušan Ećimović, Milan Vlaisavljević, Mladen Kulić, Đorđe Lovrić and Milan Radaković. At the time, Džakula held the position of deputy prime minister, while Ećimović was a government minister in the RSK. Signatories on behalf of the Croatian local authorities were Zlatko Kos, Zdravko Sokić, Ivan Volf, Vladimir Delač and Želimir Malnar. Fischer signed the agreement as a witness. According to the International Criminal Tribunal for the former Yugoslavia testimony given by Džakula at the trial of Milan Martić, Ivan Milas was present at the signing of the agreement as a representative of the Government of Croatia, accompanied by Joško Morić, Croatian Deputy Interior Minister. According to Džakula, no effort was made to conceal the signing of the agreement, even though the negotiations beforehand were kept secret.

== Aftermath ==
The central RSK authorities in Knin learned of the agreement through a report filed by the 18th Corps of the Army of the Republic of Serb Krajina on 26 February, eight days after it was signed. The main opposition to the agreement came from Milan Martić, the RSK Interior Minister. Leadership of the ruling Serb Democratic Party accused Džakula of handing the RSK territory to Croatia. The RSK leadership considered the Daruvar Agreement tantamount to admission of economic unfeasibility of the RSK and an act of treason. District council of the RSK-controlled western Slavonia condemned the agreement because it was enacted only in Croatian, and failed to note the existence of the RSK or its administrative divisions.

Džakula and Ećimović were sacked from their government positions, and from the positions of regional authority in the RSK-held western Slavonia. The other three RSK signatories were dismissed from their official posts as well. At local elections held in May 1993 to fill the vacated posts, Džakula was elected to serve as the mayor of Pakrac municipality. On 21 September, Džakula and Ećimović were arrested, and taken to Knin prison and then to Glina while the investigation was in progress. On 3 December, they were released only to learn that the arrest of the two, and Kulić, was ordered days later. In order to evade the arrest, the three fled the RSK to Serbia. On 4 February 1994, Džakula was abducted in Belgrade by the RSK agents and taken back to the RSK.

The RSK's response to the agreement ended Fischer's efforts. Moreover, Fischer, Zabala and Platzer were criticised by the UN, citing their excessive assertiveness in the matter. Fischer left Croatia, and Jordanian General Shabshough replaced Zabala in March. The Zagreb–Belgrade motorway was reopened in December 1994 through an agreement between the governments of the RSK and Croatia. However, a series of armed incidents in late April 1995 led to a Croatian military intervention and the capture of the portion of Sector West previously controlled by the RSK in Operation Flash in early May.

== See also ==
- Erdut Agreement
