= Arnold Kohn =

- Born: 21 May 1905; Dobrovac, near Lipik, Austro-Hungarian Monarchy (now Croatia)
- Died: 16 November 1984 (aged 79); Osijek, SFR Yugoslavia (now Croatia)
- Relatives: Samuel and Roza Kohn (parents); Benko Kohn (brother); Ilona Kohn (sister); Leo Kohn (brother); Ljubica Kohn (sister); Mira Kohn (sister); Olga Kohn (sister); Hinko Kohn (brother); Cilika Kohn (sister); Irma Kohn (sister); Zlatko Kohn (brother); Berta Kohn (sister); Robert Kohn (brother)

Arnold Kohn (21 May 1905 – 16 November 1984) was a Croatian Zionist, longtime president of the Jewish community Osijek and Holocaust survivor.

== Biography ==
Kohn was born in Dobrovac, near Lipik, to a Jewish Orthodox Zionist family on 21 May 1905. His family was engaged in grocery store trade. In 1905 Kohn moved to Osijek with his family. During World War II, in 1942, Kohn and his family were deported to Auschwitz from their home in Tenja, near Osijek. While at Auschwitz, inmate number "62178" was tattooed onto his arm. Kohn survived the Holocaust while all members of his immediate family (mother, brothers and sisters) perished in the Nazi concentration camps. After his return from Mauthausen-Gusen concentration camp in 1945 Kohn was physically and mentally exhausted, on the verge of death. After his recovery, he participated in the restoration of the Jewish community of Osijek.

He was a longtime president of the union of trade and craft workers in Osijek. In 1962 he was awarded with the "Medal of the Socialist Alliance of Working People of Yugoslavia". Within the Jewish community of Osijek he was a longtime member of the board, and from 1965 to 1975 he was the president of the community. Kohn's special merit is in setting the Oscar Nemon monument "Mother and Child" dedicated to Jews who perished during the Holocaust and the victims of fascism. Kohn was also a member of the Union of Jewish Communities of Yugoslavia executive committee. He died in Osijek on 16 November 1984.

== Bibliography ==
- Živaković-Kerže, Zlata (2005). Židovi u Osijeku (1918.-1941.). Osijek: Židovska općina Osijek – Tiskara Pauk d.o.o., Cerna. ISBN 953-6659-22-0.
