= Backstop =

Backstop may refer to:

== Sport ==
- Backstop (baseball), a screen behind a field's home plate
  - Catcher, a defensive baseball position behind home plate
- Backstop, a player position in rounders similar to the catcher in baseball
- Backstop, in the glossary of rowing terms
- Backstop (shooting), a construction of sand or other materials used to stop and contain bullets, for example at shooting ranges

== Fictional characters ==
- Back-Stop (G.I. Joe), a fictional character in the G.I. Joe universe
- Backstop (Transformers), a fictional character in the Transformers: Cybertron animated series and toy line

== Other uses ==
- Backstop (geology), a tectonic feature
- Backstopping markets, a financial term related to the use of the Greenspan put
- Backstop resources, an economic theory
- Operation Backstop, United Nations Protection Force (UNPROFOR) military plan during the Croatian War of Independence
- Irish backstop, a familiar name for the concept of a temporary EU/UK common customs area, proposed in the (failed) 2018 draft Brexit withdrawal agreement

== See also ==
- Buffer stop or bumper, a railway device
