= Operation Backstop =

1992 UN military plan in Croatia

Coordinates: 45.249996°N 17.178127°E

- Part of the Croatian War of Independence
- UNPA Western Slavonia/Sector West (shaded green) on a map of Croatia. Other UNPAs/sectors are shaded red, blue and purple.
- Type: Preemptive deployment
- Location: Western Slavonia, Croatia
- Planned by: United Nations Protection Force
- Objective: Defence of the UNPA Western Slavonia
- Date: Early 1993
- Executed by: Elements of the Princess Patricia's Canadian Light Infantry
- Outcome: No combat resulted from the deployment.
- Casualties: None

Operation Backstop was a United Nations Protection Force (UNPROFOR) military plan designed to guard a portion of the United Nations Protected Areas (UNPAs) against attack by the Croatian Army (Hrvatska vojska – HV) during the Croatian War of Independence. The operation, developed by the UNPROFOR staff in charge of the UNPA Western Slavonia (Sector West) in 1992, was scheduled to be implemented by two mechanised companies of the Princess Patricia's Canadian Light Infantry (PPCLI) battalion deployed in the area.

Although no HV attack occurred in the area during the UNPROFOR mandate, elements of the plan were used by the 3rd Battalion of the PPCLI as the HV clashed with the Army of the Republic of Serb Krajina (ARSK) in the January 1993 Operation Maslenica. The 2nd Battalion of the PPCLI implemented the plan in March 1993 to demonstrate UNPROFOR resolve. The UNPROFOR Sector West deputy commander considered the plan impractical except for deterrence, due to security concerns.

== Background ==
In November 1991 Croatia, Serbia and the Yugoslav People's Army (Jugoslovenska Narodna Armija – JNA) agreed upon the Vance plan, designed to halt combat operations in the Croatian War of Independence and allow the negotiation of a political settlement. In addition to the ceasefire, the plan protected civilians in specific areas—designated as United Nations Protected Areas (UNPAs)—and UN peacekeepers in Croatia. The ceasefire went into effect on 3 January 1992. Shortly after the Vance plan was accepted the European Community announced its decision to grant diplomatic recognition to Croatia on 15 January 1992, and the Serb- and JNA-held areas of Croatia were organised as the Republic of Serbian Krajina (RSK).

Despite the Vance plan's requirement for the immediate withdrawal of JNA personnel and equipment from Croatia, the JNA stayed behind for seven to eight months. When its troops eventually pulled out, the JNA transferred their equipment to the RSK. Because of organisational problems and breaches of the ceasefire, the UNPROFOR did not begin to deploy until 8 March and took two months to fully assemble in the UNPAs. The UNPROFOR was tasked with demilitarising the UNPAs, maintaining the ceasefire, monitoring local police and creating conditions for the return of internally displaced persons and refugees. These comprised more than 300,000 Croats who were exiled from RSK-controlled territory and 20,000 Serbs who fled areas of western Slavonia captured by the Croatian Army (Hrvatska vojska – HV) in Operations Swath-10, Papuk-91 and Hurricane-91 in late 1991.

A portion of western Slavonia, encompassing an area approximately 90 by 45 kilometres (56 by 28 miles), was designated as the UNPA Western Slavonia (or Sector West) by the peace plan. Although unlike other UNPAs, the RSK controlled only about one-third of the area—in the south, centred on the town of Okučani—the RSK-held area included a section of the Zagreb–Belgrade motorway. Sector West was divided into four areas of responsibility (AORs). The western portion of the motorway section and its surroundings were assigned to a Jordanian battalion of the UNPROFOR (JORDBAT), and the area to the east (containing the rest of the motorway within the UNPA and the town of Okučani) was the AOR of a Nepalese battalion (NEPBAT). To the north of the JORDBAT and NEPBAT AORs, a Canadian battalion (CANBAT 1) AOR was established. The northernmost portion of Sector West became the AOR of an Argentine battalion (ARGBAT). Unlike the Canadians, who had at their disposal 83 armoured personnel carriers, the Jordanian and Nepalese troops were equipped with small arms only. Sector West was commanded by Argentine Brigadier General Carlos Maria Zabala, and most of the staff work was assigned to the Canadians. The UNPROFOR established two storage depots for Army of the RSK (ARSK) heavy weapons, near Pakrac and in Stara Gradiška, and the HV moved its heavy weapons 30 kilometres (19 miles) away from Sector West. Although the storage facilities were guarded by the UNPROFOR, the RSK was allowed access to maintain the weapons.

=== Canadian order of battle ===
CANBAT 1 initially included elements from the 1st Battalion of the Royal 22nd Regiment, the 3rd Battalion of the Royal Canadian Regiment (RCR) and the 8th Canadian Hussars under Lieutenant Colonel Michel Jones. Although lead elements of the unit reached Croatia on 8 April, it took two weeks for all the CANBAT 1 troops to arrive. In September 1992, the CANBAT 1 troops were replaced by the 3rd Battalion of the Princess Patricia's Canadian Light Infantry (PPCLI). CANBAT 1 was headquartered in Polom Barracks, between the towns of Pakrac and Daruvar.

== Plan ==
Map of the UNPROFOR-planned Operation Backstop on the map of the UNPA Western Slavonia (Sector West)

The UNPROFOR operations staff in Sector West developed several defensive plans, assigning top priority to the plan codenamed Operation Backstop. It envisaged an active defence against the HV, assuming that the attack's main axis would be the Zagreb–Belgrade motorway. CANBAT 1 (supported by General Zabala) thought the HV would attack Sector West to control the Zagreb–Belgrade motorway, and the UN would not object to such a move. Any Croatian attack in the area was likely to employ substantially larger forces than those earmarked for Operation Backstop.

CANBAT 1 was expected to deploy one mechanised company each to the JORDBAT and the NEPBAT AORs to position themselves defensively. The forces would attempt to deter the HV from advancing, demonstrate its resolve to defend Sector West, engage the HV with antitank weapons and mortars, protect the Jordanian and Nepalese withdrawal and withdraw under the protection of CANBAT 1. The two companies required eight hours notice of the HV advance to reach their designated positions in time. Presumably, the ARSK would retrieve its heavy weapons from the UNPROFOR storage by force and resist the HV.

=== Reaction to Operation Maslenica ===
In January 1993, when the HV launched Operation Maslenica (which aimed to capture the Maslenica Bridge), Canadian troops acted in accordance with part of Operation Backstop. They dug in their positions, reinforcing the Nepalese troops for 72 hours and expecting an HV attack in Sector West. No reinforcements were deployed to the JORDBAT AOR, and the UNPROFOR prepared to blow up the only bridge across the Sava River (linking Sector West and Bosnian Serb-held territory in Bosnia and Herzegovina) to prevent the Army of Republika Srpska from advancing into the area.

In response to Operation Maslenica, RSK president Goran Hadžić ordered the ARSK to retrieve its tanks from UN storage in Sector West and attack Nova Gradiška and Novska. When local RSK authorities (led by Veljko Džakula in Sector West) demanded an explanation of the order from Hadžić, he said that the Croatian forces were about to attack Okučani. On 26 January Zabala met with Džakula in Okučani and reassured him that the UNPROFOR would protect Sector West from a Croatian attack, agreeing to provide the RSK with a written guarantee to that effect. Although Hadžić accepted the assurance and cancelled the attack, the orders were reinstated and cancelled three more times over the next two days. On 7 February, Canadian troops drilled the deck of the bridge spanning the Strug Channel (north of Stara Gradiška) to place demolition charges. The move was protested by RSK authorities, who saw the route (the only link between Okučani and Serb-controlled territory in Bosnia and Herzegovina) as crucial to an evacuation in the event of an anticipated Croatian attack. The situation calmed down by mid-February, and the HV did not attack Sector West.

=== Exercise ===
The 2nd Battalion of the PPCLI replaced the 3rd Battalion in April as CANBAT 1. The commander of the 2nd Battalion, Lieutenant Colonel Jim Calvin, instructed his troops to approach their tasks differently than the 3rd Battalion had. Calvin (unlike his predecessor) did not want the RSK forces or the HV to be aware of CANBAT 1 operations, ordering the battalion to observe radio silence. According to Canadian journalist Carol Off, Calvin was eager to fight and instructed his troops to return fire if necessary. The situation in Sector West deteriorated when Jordanian General Shabshough replaced Zabala in March. A major contribution to the deterioration was Shabshough's minimal involvement with local authorities, in contrast to Zabala's cooperative approach.

To reassure the Sector West Croatian Serb population, CANBAT 1 performed an Operation Backstop exercise and the tasks needed to evacuate NEPBAT in March or April 1993. Afterwards, Canadian Sector West deputy commander Colonel K. C. Hague recommended that the plan be redesigned primarily as a means of deterrence. Hague felt that if Operation Backstop triggered an armed clash with the HV the UNPROFOR would be forced to withdraw through Croatia, exposing the peacekeepers to grave danger.

== Aftermath ==
According to Croatian political scientist Vladimir Filipović, it is unclear whether the limited resources earmarked for the operation and the unclear motivation of CANBAT 1 troops would stop several HV brigades; according to Hague, the plan did not indicate how CANBAT 1 or the other elements of the UNPROFOR would retreat through Croatia after such a clash. Hague questioned the feasibility of Operation Backstop, because the advance-warning requirement was considered impossible to meet. The UNPROFOR had no reliable military intelligence on HV movements outside the UNPAs, or beyond 30-kilometre (19 mi)-wide zones around the UNPAs (where only United Nations Military Observers were present). However, Hague considered Operation Backstop a deterrent.

Although Operation Backstop was within the UNPROFOR mandate (since the peacekeepers were authorised to use force to prevent armed incursions into the UNPAs), Croatian authorities resented the operation. Croatia considered the UNPROFOR overzealous in defending the UNPAs and protecting the Serbs while failing to ensure the fulfilment of other aspects of the Vance plan, such as the return of refugees to their homes.

By September 1993, CANBAT 1 was relocated from Sector West to Sector South (northern Dalmatia and Lika). The UNPFROFOR mandate in Croatia expired on 31 March 1995, and the United Nations Security Council adopted Resolution 981 establishing the United Nations Confidence Restoration Operation in Croatia (UNCRO) instead. Sector West was captured by the HV in Operation Flash in early May 1995, with no resistance from UN peacekeepers. The main axis of the first day's HV advance was the Zagreb–Belgrade motorway, as anticipated by the planners of Operation Backstop.
