= Gaj, Požega-Slavonia County =

Coordinates: 45°28′44″N 17°01′48″E

Gaj
- Village
- Interactive map of Gaj
- Country: Croatia
- County: Požega-Slavonia
- Municipality: Lipik

Area
  - Total: 5.1 sq mi (13.1 km^{2})

Population (2021)
  - Total: 234
  - Density: 46.3/sq mi (17.9/km^{2})
- Time zone: UTC+1 (CET)
  - Summer (DST): UTC+2 (CEST)

Gaj is a village in Croatia, administratively located in the Town of Lipik in Požega-Slavonia County. It is known for its RomanSaturnalia festival.
