= Veljko Milićević =

Serbian author (1886–1929)

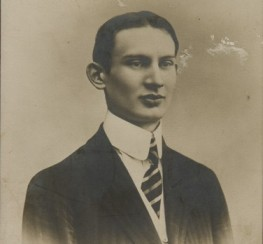

4th Minister of Finance and Construction of Kingdom of Montenegro in-Exile
- In office 11 June – 15 September 1917
- Monarch: Nicholas I
- Prime Minister: Evgenije Popović
- Preceded by: Stanisa Iljić
- Succeeded by: Pero Šoć

4th Minister of Education and Ecclesiastical Affairs of Kingdom of Montenegro in-Exile
- In office 11 June – 15 September 1917
- Monarch: Nicholas I
- Prime Minister: Evgenije Popović
- Preceded by: Milutin Tomanović
- Succeeded by: Pero Šoć

Personal details
- Born: 14 January 1886 Donji Čaglić, Austria-Hungary
- Died: 5 November 1929 (aged 43) Belgrade, Kingdom of Yugoslavia
- Children: 1
- Occupation: Author

Veljko M. Milićević (Serbian Cyrillic: Вељко М. Милићевић; 14 January 1886 – 5 November 1929) was a Serbian writer, translator, publicist and journalist. He is considered "the first authentic narrator of a modern formal stylistic and thematic orientation in Serbian literature at the beginning of the twentieth century."

A short story (pripovetke) writer, Veljko Miličević wrote under a French pseudonym L'homme qui rit.

== Biography ==
Veljko M. Milićević was born in Donji Čaglić in Slavonia, then part of Austria-Hungary, on 14 January 1886, being the son of a rich merchant who travelled and settled in Lika when Veljko was still a boy. At the age of ten Veljko was placed in one Lika's better grammar schools in Donji Lapac and high schools in Gospić and then in Zagreb. After graduating, he enrolled in the Faculty of Law of the University of Belgrade. From Belgrade, he continued his law studies in Geneva, but switched over to the Faculty of Philosophy where he studied Romance languages and Literature (1904/1905). Afterward, he went to London where he studied the French language and literature (1905-1906). He resumed his post-graduate studies in French at the University of Paris (1906-1908), where he graduated with honours. During this time, he was contributing writer for Sarajevo's famed literary periodical Srpski riječi. Upon his return from abroad, he was contributing to practically every major Serbian newspaper, magazine, and periodical in the country, including Sarajevo's Narod; Zagreb's Vremena, Novi List, Epoha; and Belgrade's Politika. He was a staff writer for the Belgrade daily newspaper Politika from 1923 until 1929.

== Works ==
His first original works were Mrtvi Život (Dead Life, 1903), Vihor (Whirlwind, 1904) and Bespuće (Wastelands, 1906). He is also known for his "Pripovetke" (Short Stories), compiled posthumously and published in 1930.

Milićević published a translation of Claude Farrère's La Bataille (The Battle; 1909) in Sarajevo in 1912. He also translated the works of classical writers such as Guy de Maupassant, Stendhal, Thomas Babington Macaulay, 1st Baron Macaulay, Henry Hallam, Charles Dickens, Archibald Reiss, and several Czech and Slovenian writers as well. His contemporaries were Stevan Bešević-Petrov, Dragomir Brzak, Josip Bersa, Miloš Perović, Vladimir Stanimirović, and Vladislav Petković Dis.

He was not a voluminous writer, and during the latter part of his life produced little of note. He died on 5 November 1929, aged 44.

== Sources ==
- Translated and adapted from Jovan Skerlić's Istorija nove srpske književnosti (Belgrade, 1914, 1921)
