= Antunovac, Lipik =

Settlement in Požega-Slavonia County, Croatia

Antunovac
- settlement
- Interactive map of Antunovac
- Location within Croatia
- Coordinates: 45°29′46″N 16°59′49″E
- Country: Croatia
- County: Požega-Slavonia
- City: Lipik

Area
  - Total: 14.7 km^{2} (5.7 sq mi)

Population (2021)
  - Total: 307
  - Density: 20.9/km^{2} (54.1/sq mi)
- Time zone: UTC+1 (CET)
  - Summer (DST): UTC+2 (CEST)
- Postal code: 34550 Pakrac
- Area code: +385 (0)34

Antunovac is a settlement in the City of Lipik in Croatia. In 2021, its population was 307.

== Demographics ==
Antunovac: Population trends 1857–2021
v

population		800	839	1410	1249	1397	1310	1235	1112	1564	1016	805	620	512	422	363	307
	1857	1869	1880	1890	1900	1910	1921	1931	1948	1953	1961	1971	1981	1991	2001	2011	2021

Sources: Croatian Bureau of Statistics publications
