= Donji Čaglić =

Coordinates: 45°23′N 17°09′E

- Village
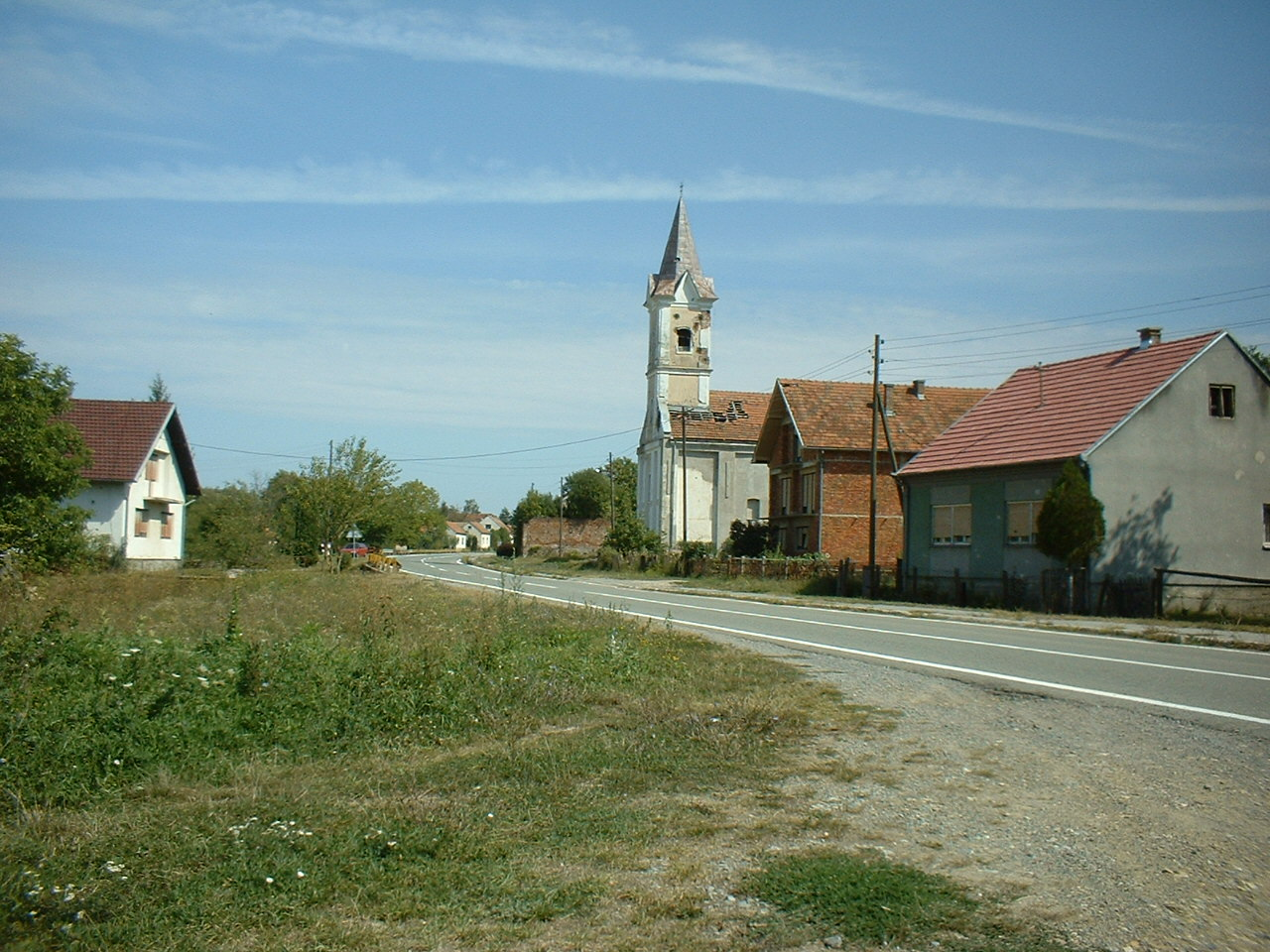
- View of the Serbian Orthodox Church of Donji Caglic
- Interactive map of Donji Čaglić
- Country: Croatia
- County: Požega-Slavonia
- Municipality: Lipik

Area
  - Total: 7.1 km^{2} (2.7 sq mi)

Population (2021)
  - Total: 225
  - Density: 32/km^{2} (82/sq mi)
- Time zone: UTC+1 (CET)
  - Summer (DST): UTC+2 (CEST)

Donji Čaglić is a village in Croatia. It is connected by the D5 highway.

== Notable people ==
- Veljko Milićević
