= SAO Western Slavonia =

Self-proclaimed region in Croatia, 1991–1995

Serbian Autonomous Oblast of Western Slavonia Srpska autonomna oblast Zapadna Slavonija Српска аутономна област Западна Славонија
- 1991
- Flag

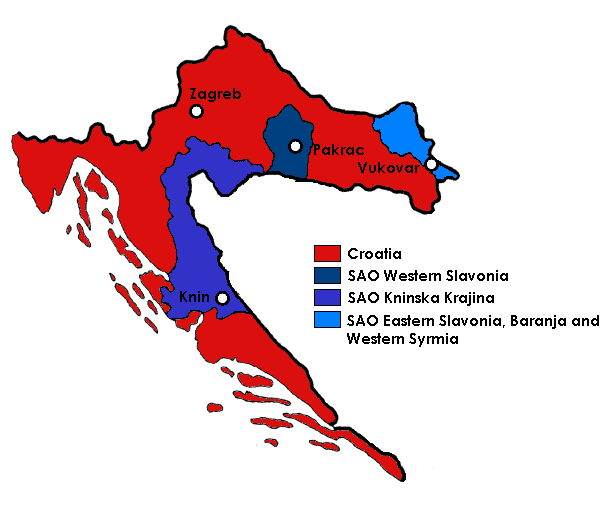
- SAO Western Slavonia (central blue area) within SR Croatia (red).
- Status: Self-proclaimed autonomous oblast
- Capital: Pakrac
- Government: Provisional government
  - Military Commander: Rade Čakmak
- Historical era: Breakup of Yugoslavia
  - Established: 12 August 1991
| Preceded by | Succeeded by |
| Republic of Croatia | Republic of Serbian Krajina |

The Serbian Autonomous Oblast of Western Slavonia (Serbo-Croatian: Srpska autonomna oblast Zapadna Slavonija, Српска аутономна област Западна Славонија) was a Serbian self-proclaimed Serb Autonomous Region (oblast) within Croatia. It was formed on 12 August 1991 and was subsequently included into the Republic of Serbian Krajina. It was eliminated and reintegrated into Croatia in May 1995, during Operation Flash.

== History ==
Shortly after the proclamation of the SAO Western Slavonia, rebel Serb forces, assisted by the Serb-led Yugoslav People's Army (JNA) and Serb paramilitary forces (from Serbia and Bosnia-Herzegovina), took Okučani and Daruvar, threatening to sever Slavonia from Croatia proper. At this time, the area under Serbian control was relatively large, although the majority of the region was hilly and forested with poor infrastructure. During the next months, there was fierce battle for Pakrac as paramilitaries ethnically cleansed Croats from newly captured Western Slavonic districts. Most of the region was patrolled by poorly equipped Serbian militias drawn from the local Serb villages, and with JNA resources widely distributed at a precarious time, they were not in position to effectively dissect Croatia.

On October 31, 1991, Croatian forces launched Operation Otkos 10 securing the Bilogora hills. Following this success, the Croat Operation Orkan 91, on December 12, pushed back the Serb/Yugoslav forces into a small pocket only a fraction of the initial territory controlled. In the operation, Daruvar was liberated. During their retreat, Serbian paramilitaries committed the Voćin massacre. On January 2, 1992, the UN brokered a ceasefire in Sarajevo, it is possible that this stopped the Croatian forces from eliminating the rebel Serb presence in Western Slavonia.

On February 18, 1993, Croatian and local Serb leaders signed the Daruvar Agreement. The Agreement was kept secret and was working towards normalising life for the locals on the battlefield line. However, the rebel Serb authorities from Knin learned of the deal and arrested the rebel Serb leaders responsible for it.

The Serb enclave of Western Slavonia was eliminated and the area reintegrated into Croatia in two days in May 1995, during Operation Flash. In retaliation for this thorough defeat, Milan Martić launched rockets at Zagreb.

== Administrative divisions ==
The territory of Western Slavonia under protection by the United Nations included four municipalities: Okučani, Pakrac, Daruvar and Grubišno Polje. The Army of the Republic of Serbian Krajina had controlled the municipalities of Okučani and Pakrac.

== Population ==
The population of municipalities of Western Slavonia according to the population census in 1991 (note that these did not correspond SAO Slavonia which mostly included Serb settlements of the municipalities, not one of them wholly):

- Pakrac: 7,818 Serbs (47.76%), 5,619 Croats (34.33%), 2,930 others (17.91%)
- Daruvar: Relative Croat majority (34.75%)
- Grubišno Polje: Relative Croat majority

== See also ==
- Croatian War of Independence
- Breakup of Yugoslavia
- Republic of Serbian Krajina
- Serbian Autonomous Oblasts
- SAO Kninska Krajina
- SAO Eastern Slavonia, Baranja and Western Syrmia
- Socialist Republic of Croatia

| Region | until 1918 | 1918– 1929 | 1929– 1945 | 1941– 1945 | 1945– 1946 | 1946– 1963 | 1963– 1992 | 1992– 2003 | 2003– 2006 | 2006– 2008 | since 2008 |
|---|---|---|---|---|---|---|---|---|---|---|---|
| Slovenia | Part of Austria-Hungary including the Bay of Kotor See also: Kingdom of Croatia-Slavonia (1868–1918) Kingdom of Dalmatia (1815–1918) Condominium of Bosnia and Herzegovina (1878–1918) | State of Slovenes, Croats and Serbs (1918) Kingdom of Serbs, Croats and Slovenes (1918–1929) Kingdom of Yugoslavia (1929–1943) See also: Republic of Prekmurje (1919) Banat, Bačka and Baranja (1918–1919) Free State of Fiume (1920–1924) (1924–1945) Italian province of Zadar (1920–1947) | | Annexed by Italy, Germany, and Hungary^{a} | Democratic Federal Yugoslavia (1943–1945) Federal People's Republic of Yugoslavia (1945–1963) Socialist Federal Republic of Yugoslavia (1963–1992) Consisted of the Socialist Republics of: Slovenia (1945–1991); Croatia (1945–1991); Bosnia and Herzegovina (1945–1992) Serbia (1945–1992) (included the autonomous provinces of Vojvodina and Kosovo) Montenegro (1945–1992); Macedonia (1945–1991) See also: Free Territory of Trieste (1947–1954)^{h} | | | Republic of Slovenia; Ten-Day War | | | |
| Dalmatia | Part of Austria-Hungary including the Bay of Kotor See also: Kingdom of Croatia-Slavonia (1868–1918) Kingdom of Dalmatia (1815–1918) Condominium of Bosnia and Herzegovina (1878–1918) | State of Slovenes, Croats and Serbs (1918) Kingdom of Serbs, Croats and Slovenes (1918–1929) Kingdom of Yugoslavia (1929–1943) See also: Republic of Prekmurje (1919) Banat, Bačka and Baranja (1918–1919) Free State of Fiume (1920–1924) (1924–1945) Italian province of Zadar (1920–1947) | | Independent State of Croatia (1941–1945) Puppet state of Germany. Parts annexed by Italy. Međimurje and Baranja annexed by Hungary. | Democratic Federal Yugoslavia (1943–1945) Federal People's Republic of Yugoslavia (1945–1963) Socialist Federal Republic of Yugoslavia (1963–1992) Consisted of the Socialist Republics of: Slovenia (1945–1991); Croatia (1945–1991); Bosnia and Herzegovina (1945–1992) Serbia (1945–1992) (included the autonomous provinces of Vojvodina and Kosovo) Montenegro (1945–1992); Macedonia (1945–1991) See also: Free Territory of Trieste (1947–1954)^{h} | | | Republic of Croatia^{b} Croatian War of Independence | | | |
| Slavonia | Part of Austria-Hungary including the Bay of Kotor See also: Kingdom of Croatia-Slavonia (1868–1918) Kingdom of Dalmatia (1815–1918) Condominium of Bosnia and Herzegovina (1878–1918) | State of Slovenes, Croats and Serbs (1918) Kingdom of Serbs, Croats and Slovenes (1918–1929) Kingdom of Yugoslavia (1929–1943) See also: Republic of Prekmurje (1919) Banat, Bačka and Baranja (1918–1919) Free State of Fiume (1920–1924) (1924–1945) Italian province of Zadar (1920–1947) | | Independent State of Croatia (1941–1945) Puppet state of Germany. Parts annexed by Italy. Međimurje and Baranja annexed by Hungary. | Democratic Federal Yugoslavia (1943–1945) Federal People's Republic of Yugoslavia (1945–1963) Socialist Federal Republic of Yugoslavia (1963–1992) Consisted of the Socialist Republics of: Slovenia (1945–1991); Croatia (1945–1991); Bosnia and Herzegovina (1945–1992) Serbia (1945–1992) (included the autonomous provinces of Vojvodina and Kosovo) Montenegro (1945–1992); Macedonia (1945–1991) See also: Free Territory of Trieste (1947–1954)^{h} | | | Republic of Croatia^{b} Croatian War of Independence | | | |
| Croatia | Part of Austria-Hungary including the Bay of Kotor See also: Kingdom of Croatia-Slavonia (1868–1918) Kingdom of Dalmatia (1815–1918) Condominium of Bosnia and Herzegovina (1878–1918) | State of Slovenes, Croats and Serbs (1918) Kingdom of Serbs, Croats and Slovenes (1918–1929) Kingdom of Yugoslavia (1929–1943) See also: Republic of Prekmurje (1919) Banat, Bačka and Baranja (1918–1919) Free State of Fiume (1920–1924) (1924–1945) Italian province of Zadar (1920–1947) | | Independent State of Croatia (1941–1945) Puppet state of Germany. Parts annexed by Italy. Međimurje and Baranja annexed by Hungary. | Democratic Federal Yugoslavia (1943–1945) Federal People's Republic of Yugoslavia (1945–1963) Socialist Federal Republic of Yugoslavia (1963–1992) Consisted of the Socialist Republics of: Slovenia (1945–1991); Croatia (1945–1991); Bosnia and Herzegovina (1945–1992) Serbia (1945–1992) (included the autonomous provinces of Vojvodina and Kosovo) Montenegro (1945–1992); Macedonia (1945–1991) See also: Free Territory of Trieste (1947–1954)^{h} | | | Republic of Croatia^{b} Croatian War of Independence | | | |
| Bosnia | Part of Austria-Hungary including the Bay of Kotor See also: Kingdom of Croatia-Slavonia (1868–1918) Kingdom of Dalmatia (1815–1918) Condominium of Bosnia and Herzegovina (1878–1918) | State of Slovenes, Croats and Serbs (1918) Kingdom of Serbs, Croats and Slovenes (1918–1929) Kingdom of Yugoslavia (1929–1943) See also: Republic of Prekmurje (1919) Banat, Bačka and Baranja (1918–1919) Free State of Fiume (1920–1924) (1924–1945) Italian province of Zadar (1920–1947) | | Independent State of Croatia (1941–1945) Puppet state of Germany. Parts annexed by Italy. Međimurje and Baranja annexed by Hungary. | Democratic Federal Yugoslavia (1943–1945) Federal People's Republic of Yugoslavia (1945–1963) Socialist Federal Republic of Yugoslavia (1963–1992) Consisted of the Socialist Republics of: Slovenia (1945–1991); Croatia (1945–1991); Bosnia and Herzegovina (1945–1992) Serbia (1945–1992) (included the autonomous provinces of Vojvodina and Kosovo) Montenegro (1945–1992); Macedonia (1945–1991) See also: Free Territory of Trieste (1947–1954)^{h} | | | Bosnia and Herzegovina^{c} Bosnian War Consists of the Federation of Bosnia and Herzegovina (since 1995), Republika Srpska (since 1995), and Brčko District (since 2000). | | | |
| Herzegovina | Part of Austria-Hungary including the Bay of Kotor See also: Kingdom of Croatia-Slavonia (1868–1918) Kingdom of Dalmatia (1815–1918) Condominium of Bosnia and Herzegovina (1878–1918) | State of Slovenes, Croats and Serbs (1918) Kingdom of Serbs, Croats and Slovenes (1918–1929) Kingdom of Yugoslavia (1929–1943) See also: Republic of Prekmurje (1919) Banat, Bačka and Baranja (1918–1919) Free State of Fiume (1920–1924) (1924–1945) Italian province of Zadar (1920–1947) | | Independent State of Croatia (1941–1945) Puppet state of Germany. Parts annexed by Italy. Međimurje and Baranja annexed by Hungary. | Democratic Federal Yugoslavia (1943–1945) Federal People's Republic of Yugoslavia (1945–1963) Socialist Federal Republic of Yugoslavia (1963–1992) Consisted of the Socialist Republics of: Slovenia (1945–1991); Croatia (1945–1991); Bosnia and Herzegovina (1945–1992) Serbia (1945–1992) (included the autonomous provinces of Vojvodina and Kosovo) Montenegro (1945–1992); Macedonia (1945–1991) See also: Free Territory of Trieste (1947–1954)^{h} | | | Bosnia and Herzegovina^{c} Bosnian War Consists of the Federation of Bosnia and Herzegovina (since 1995), Republika Srpska (since 1995), and Brčko District (since 2000). | | | |
| Vojvodina | Part of the Délvidék region of Hungary | State of Slovenes, Croats and Serbs (1918) Kingdom of Serbs, Croats and Slovenes (1918–1929) Kingdom of Yugoslavia (1929–1943) See also: Republic of Prekmurje (1919) Banat, Bačka and Baranja (1918–1919) Free State of Fiume (1920–1924) (1924–1945) Italian province of Zadar (1920–1947) | | Autonomous Banat^{d} (part of the German; Territory of the Military Commander in Serbia) | Democratic Federal Yugoslavia (1943–1945) Federal People's Republic of Yugoslavia (1945–1963) Socialist Federal Republic of Yugoslavia (1963–1992) Consisted of the Socialist Republics of: Slovenia (1945–1991); Croatia (1945–1991); Bosnia and Herzegovina (1945–1992) Serbia (1945–1992) (included the autonomous provinces of Vojvodina and Kosovo) Montenegro (1945–1992); Macedonia (1945–1991) See also: Free Territory of Trieste (1947–1954)^{h} | | | Federal Republic of Yugoslavia Consisted of the Republic of Serbia (1992–2006) and Republic of Montenegro (1992–2006) Included Kosovo and Metohija, under UN administration, without control since 1999 | State Union of Serbia and Montenegro Included Kosovo, under UN administration | Republic of Serbia Included the autonomous provinces of Vojvodina and Kosovo and Metohija under UN administration | Republic of Serbia Includes the autonomous province of Vojvodina; Kosovo claim |
| Central Serbia | Kingdom of Serbia (1882–1918) | State of Slovenes, Croats and Serbs (1918) Kingdom of Serbs, Croats and Slovenes (1918–1929) Kingdom of Yugoslavia (1929–1943) See also: Republic of Prekmurje (1919) Banat, Bačka and Baranja (1918–1919) Free State of Fiume (1920–1924) (1924–1945) Italian province of Zadar (1920–1947) | | Territory of the Military Commander in Serbia (1941–1944) ^{e} | Democratic Federal Yugoslavia (1943–1945) Federal People's Republic of Yugoslavia (1945–1963) Socialist Federal Republic of Yugoslavia (1963–1992) Consisted of the Socialist Republics of: Slovenia (1945–1991); Croatia (1945–1991); Bosnia and Herzegovina (1945–1992) Serbia (1945–1992) (included the autonomous provinces of Vojvodina and Kosovo) Montenegro (1945–1992); Macedonia (1945–1991) See also: Free Territory of Trieste (1947–1954)^{h} | | | Federal Republic of Yugoslavia Consisted of the Republic of Serbia (1992–2006) and Republic of Montenegro (1992–2006) Included Kosovo and Metohija, under UN administration, without control since 1999 | State Union of Serbia and Montenegro Included Kosovo, under UN administration | Republic of Serbia Included the autonomous provinces of Vojvodina and Kosovo and Metohija under UN administration | Republic of Serbia Includes the autonomous province of Vojvodina; Kosovo claim |
| Kosovo | Part of the Kingdom of Serbia (1912–1918) | State of Slovenes, Croats and Serbs (1918) Kingdom of Serbs, Croats and Slovenes (1918–1929) Kingdom of Yugoslavia (1929–1943) See also: Republic of Prekmurje (1919) Banat, Bačka and Baranja (1918–1919) Free State of Fiume (1920–1924) (1924–1945) Italian province of Zadar (1920–1947) | | Mostly annexed by Italian Albania (1941–1944) along with western Macedonia and south-eastern Montenegro | Democratic Federal Yugoslavia (1943–1945) Federal People's Republic of Yugoslavia (1945–1963) Socialist Federal Republic of Yugoslavia (1963–1992) Consisted of the Socialist Republics of: Slovenia (1945–1991); Croatia (1945–1991); Bosnia and Herzegovina (1945–1992) Serbia (1945–1992) (included the autonomous provinces of Vojvodina and Kosovo) Montenegro (1945–1992); Macedonia (1945–1991) See also: Free Territory of Trieste (1947–1954)^{h} | | | Federal Republic of Yugoslavia Consisted of the Republic of Serbia (1992–2006) and Republic of Montenegro (1992–2006) Included Kosovo and Metohija, under UN administration, without control since 1999 | State Union of Serbia and Montenegro Included Kosovo, under UN administration | Republic of Serbia Included the autonomous provinces of Vojvodina and Kosovo and Metohija under UN administration | Republic of Kosovo |
| Metohija | Kingdom of Montenegro (1910–1918) Metohija controlled by Austria-Hungary 1915–1918 | State of Slovenes, Croats and Serbs (1918) Kingdom of Serbs, Croats and Slovenes (1918–1929) Kingdom of Yugoslavia (1929–1943) See also: Republic of Prekmurje (1919) Banat, Bačka and Baranja (1918–1919) Free State of Fiume (1920–1924) (1924–1945) Italian province of Zadar (1920–1947) | | Mostly annexed by Italian Albania (1941–1944) along with western Macedonia and south-eastern Montenegro | Democratic Federal Yugoslavia (1943–1945) Federal People's Republic of Yugoslavia (1945–1963) Socialist Federal Republic of Yugoslavia (1963–1992) Consisted of the Socialist Republics of: Slovenia (1945–1991); Croatia (1945–1991); Bosnia and Herzegovina (1945–1992) Serbia (1945–1992) (included the autonomous provinces of Vojvodina and Kosovo) Montenegro (1945–1992); Macedonia (1945–1991) See also: Free Territory of Trieste (1947–1954)^{h} | | | Federal Republic of Yugoslavia Consisted of the Republic of Serbia (1992–2006) and Republic of Montenegro (1992–2006) Included Kosovo and Metohija, under UN administration, without control since 1999 | State Union of Serbia and Montenegro Included Kosovo, under UN administration | Republic of Serbia Included the autonomous provinces of Vojvodina and Kosovo and Metohija under UN administration | Republic of Kosovo |
| Montenegro and Brda | Kingdom of Montenegro (1910–1918) Metohija controlled by Austria-Hungary 1915–1918 | State of Slovenes, Croats and Serbs (1918) Kingdom of Serbs, Croats and Slovenes (1918–1929) Kingdom of Yugoslavia (1929–1943) See also: Republic of Prekmurje (1919) Banat, Bačka and Baranja (1918–1919) Free State of Fiume (1920–1924) (1924–1945) Italian province of Zadar (1920–1947) | | Protectorate of Montenegro^{f} (1941–1944) | Democratic Federal Yugoslavia (1943–1945) Federal People's Republic of Yugoslavia (1945–1963) Socialist Federal Republic of Yugoslavia (1963–1992) Consisted of the Socialist Republics of: Slovenia (1945–1991); Croatia (1945–1991); Bosnia and Herzegovina (1945–1992) Serbia (1945–1992) (included the autonomous provinces of Vojvodina and Kosovo) Montenegro (1945–1992); Macedonia (1945–1991) See also: Free Territory of Trieste (1947–1954)^{h} | | | Federal Republic of Yugoslavia Consisted of the Republic of Serbia (1992–2006) and Republic of Montenegro (1992–2006) Included Kosovo and Metohija, under UN administration, without control since 1999 | State Union of Serbia and Montenegro Included Kosovo, under UN administration | Montenegro | |
| Vardar Macedonia | Part of the Kingdom of Serbia (1912–1918) | State of Slovenes, Croats and Serbs (1918) Kingdom of Serbs, Croats and Slovenes (1918–1929) Kingdom of Yugoslavia (1929–1943) See also: Republic of Prekmurje (1919) Banat, Bačka and Baranja (1918–1919) Free State of Fiume (1920–1924) (1924–1945) Italian province of Zadar (1920–1947) | | Annexed by the Kingdom of Bulgaria (1941–1944) | Democratic Federal Yugoslavia (1943–1945) Federal People's Republic of Yugoslavia (1945–1963) Socialist Federal Republic of Yugoslavia (1963–1992) Consisted of the Socialist Republics of: Slovenia (1945–1991); Croatia (1945–1991); Bosnia and Herzegovina (1945–1992) Serbia (1945–1992) (included the autonomous provinces of Vojvodina and Kosovo) Montenegro (1945–1992); Macedonia (1945–1991) See also: Free Territory of Trieste (1947–1954)^{h} | | | Republic of North Macedonia^{g} | | | |
^{a} Prekmurje annexed by Hungary.; ^{b} See also: SAO Kninska Krajina (1990) → SAO Krajina (1990–1991); and SAO Eastern Slavonia, Baranja and Western Syrmia (1990–1991), SAO Western Slavonia (1990–1991) and the Republic of Serbian Krajina (1990–1995), all replaced by the UN Transitional Administration for Eastern Slavonia, Baranja and Western Sirmium (1996–1998).; ^{c} See also: Republic of Bosnia and Herzegovina; Croatian Republic of Herzeg-Bosnia; and the Serbian Autonomous Oblasts (SAOs) of Bosanska Krajina, North-East Bosnia, Romanija and Herzegovina (1991–1992), which all combined to form the Serbian Republic of Bosnia and Herzegovina (1992–1995).; ^{d} Bačka was reannexed by Hungary (1941–1944), while Syrmia was annexed by the Independent State of Croatia (1941–1944).; ^{e} Including North Kosovo. See also: Republic of Užice.; ^{f} Annexed by Italy (1941–1943) and Germany (1943–1944). Smaller part annexed by the Independent State of Croatia (1941–1944).; ^{g} North Macedonia's official and constitutional name was the Republic of Macedonia until 2019. It was known in the United Nations as the former Yugoslav Republic of Macedonia because of a naming dispute with Greece.; ^{h} Free Territory was established in 1947. Its administration was divided into two areas (Zone A) and (Zone B). Free Territory was de facto taken over by Italy and SFRY in 1954.
