= Šeovica =

Coordinates: 45°25′N 17°13′E

- Village
- Interactive map of Šeovica
- Country: Croatia
- County: Požega-Slavonia
- Municipality: Lipik

Area
  - Total: 10.2 km^{2} (3.9 sq mi)

Population (2021)
  - Total: 217
  - Density: 21.3/km^{2} (55.1/sq mi)
- Time zone: UTC+1 (CET)
  - Summer (DST): UTC+2 (CEST)

Šeovica is a village in Croatia.
