= Operation Swath-10 =

Croatian War of Independence battle

Coordinates: 45°44′N 17°16′E

- Part of the Croatian War of Independence
- Western Slavonian towns on map of Croatia (JNA-held area in late December 1991 is in red)
| Date | 31 October – 4 November 1991 |
| Location | Western Slavonia, Croatia |
| Result | Croatian victory |

Belligerents
| Croatia | Yugoslavia; SAO Western Slavonia |

Commanders and leaders
| (Croatia) Franjo Kovačević | Rade Čakmak |

Units involved
| Croatian National Guard | Yugoslav People's Army: Yugoslav Ground Forces; 5th Banja Luka Corps; 2nd Krajina Brigade; Western Slavonia Territorial Defense |

Strength
| 2,647 troops 48 artillery pieces 12 armoured vehicles | c. 1,750 troops 22 artillery pieces 8 armoured vehicles |

Casualties and losses
| 5 killed Dozens wounded | 24 killed |
- 22 Serb civilians killed, 4,000 displaced

Operation Swath-10 (Croatian: Operacija Otkos-10) was a military offensive undertaken by the Croatian Army (Hrvatska vojska, or HV) against the SAO Western Slavonia Territorial Defense Forces on Bilogora Mountain in western Slavonia. Occurring from 31 October to 4 November 1991, during the Croatian War of Independence, the operation was a Croatian victory and its success set the stage for follow-up advances by Croatian forces on Papuk Mountain in Operation Papuk-91 in late November and December. By the end of the year the HV gained control of Papuk, securing transport routes between eastern Slavonia and the rest of Croatia.

The offensives were accompanied by the displacement of most of the Croatian Serb population of the area captured by the HV. The refugees initially fled to Bosnia and Herzegovina, but the majority were soon settled in the JNA-held Baranja region of eastern Croatia. The offensive provoked accusations that Croatian troops had committed ethnic cleansing and civil-rights abuses. These accusations were contested by the European Community Monitor Mission (ECMM). A month after the operation, the retreating paramilitary unit known as the White Eagles perpetrated the Voćin massacre, and its war crimes were prosecuted at the International Criminal Tribunal for the former Yugoslavia.

== Background ==
During the 1991 Yugoslav campaign in Croatia, the 5th (Banja Luka) Corps of the Yugoslav People's Army (Jugoslovenska Narodna Armija, or JNA) was tasked with advancing north through western Slavonia from Okučani to Daruvar and Virovitica and with a secondary drive from Okučani towards Kutina. This was essentially consistent with the line expected to be reached by the main thrust of the JNA, advancing from eastern Slavonia in about a week. The link was designed to facilitate a further advance west, to Zagreb and Varaždin. The corps had deployed a battlegroup of the 265th Mechanised Brigade near Okučani, supporting an advance which began on 21 September and reached the Papuk Mountains. The corps received one artillery and two motorised brigades as reinforcements during the advance, but the desertion and morale problems experienced by the JNA elsewhere also existed in the Banja Luka Corps.

The JNA was stopped by the Croatian National Guard (Zbor Narodne Garde, or ZNG) between Novska, Nova Gradiška and Pakrac, although SAO Western Slavonia Territorial Defense Forces (Teritorijalna odbrana, or TO) units took up positions on the Bilogora and Papuk north of Pakrac (near Virovitica and Slatina) with no JNA support. The capture of Ivanovo Selo, seven kilometres (4.3 miles) east of Grubišno Polje and eight kilometres (5.0 miles) north of Daruvar, on 21 September marked the territorial peak of the TO-held area on the Bilogora. The village was recaptured by the ZNG the same day, with seven dead and fifteen wounded.

On 1 October, the Banja Luka Corps began probing attacks in the region before a major effort with most of the corps three days later. The advance established defensive positions just outside Novska and Nova Gradiška. On 6 October Pakrac was briefly isolated when the JNA captured Batinjani four kilometres (2.5 miles) (northwest of the town), blocking the last road available to supply the town. The ZNG recaptured the village the same day, driving the JNA back six kilometres (3.7 miles) at a cost of 22 killed. The JNA captured Jasenovac on 8 October; Lipik and part of Pakrac were captured four days later. By then, the JNA offensive in western Slavonia had lost momentum and the ZNG made minor advances north of Novska and west of Nova Gradiška on 13 and 16 October. Croatian authorities no longer considered the war situation critical, issuing an order to plan a counter-offensive for 15 October. On 29 October, the ZNG launched Operation Hurricane-91 against positions held by the JNA and the TO near Novska and Nova Gradiška.

The TO forces in the Bilogora Mountain region were officially part of the 28th Partisan Division, commanded by Colonel Nikola Marić. In reality, they comprised about 1,750 soldiers, eight armoured vehicles, ten cannons and twelve mortars. The TO force was organised into two battalions, headquartered in the villages of Mali Grđevac and Velika Peratovica and commanded by Rade Čakmak. North of the TO-held area, the ZNG deployed the 127th Infantry Brigade in the Virovitica area. In the Grubišno Polje area south of the Bilogora, the ZNG force was subordinate to the 57th Independent Battalion (later renamed the 77th Independent Battalion). The attacking ZNG force, under Colonel Franjo Kovačević, consisted of 2,647 troops supported by twelve armoured vehicles, eighteen cannons and twenty 120-millimetre (4.7 in) mortars—surpassing the defending TO force in every respect except for the close air support of the TO by the Yugoslav Air Force. The ZNG originally planned to deploy the 105th Infantry Brigade and the Omega special-police company from Bjelovar, but the units were needed elsewhere and unavailable for the offensive.

== Timeline ==
Map of western Slavonia (modern county lines provided for reference)

Operation Swath-10 (also known as Bilogora '91) was planned by the Croatians to regain control of the Virovitica–Lončarica–Grubišno Polje road, cutting off and destroying the TO forces deployed in the area of the road (the northernmost part of western Slavonia captured by the TO or the JNA). Those objectives were also designed to deny the Banja Luka Corps support if it attempted to break through towards Virovitica; control the last remaining supply route between Zagreb and Slavonia; shorten the Croatian defensive positions, and improve troop and civilian morale. The offensive was originally scheduled for 15 October, but was postponed for two weeks due to the unavailability of the 105th Infantry Brigade and the special police. The plan of operation called for the ZNG to first cut off the two TO battalions on the Bilogora Mountain within 48 hours, with the second stage of the offensive destroying the trapped TO force. The operation was authorised by Colonel Miroslav Jezerčić, commander of Bjelovar Operational Zone, on 7 October.

The offensive was launched at 6 am on 31 October, with a 50-minute artillery bombardment followed by a ZNG advance in three groups: the 57th Independent Battalion from the south, the 127th Infantry Brigade from the north and the 1st Battalion of the 127th Infantry Brigade from the northwest. That day the ZNG captured the villages of Velika Barna, Gornja Kovačica and Zrinska, northwest of the Grubišno Polje–Veliki Grđevac road, securing Grubišno Polje. The ZNG also advanced along the Virovitica–Grubišno Polje road, arriving at the outskirts of Mala Peratovica (four kilometres (2.5 miles) east of Grubišno Polje) and approaching Lončarica (eleven kilometres (6.8 miles) south of Virovitica). The TO forces put up a strong resistance (especially near Lončarica), although the battlefield situation was described as hopeless. The TO requested close air support from the Yugoslav Air Force, and four to six aircraft were deployed in response.

On 1 November the ZNG conducted mopping-up operations in the areas northwest of Grubišno Polje, and the following day the TO force began retreating towards Papuk Mountain. Lončarica and Dapčevački Brđani (a village about two kilometres (1.2 miles) northeast of Mala Peratovica, along the Virovitica–Grubišno Polje road) were captured by the Croatian force on 3 November after they overcame strong TO resistance. That day, the ZNG was renamed the Croatian Army (Hrvatska vojska, or HV). After the villages were captured, HV forces advancing from Grubišno Polje and Virovitica met; the HV captured the village of Velika Peratovica, which was isolated by the advances along the Virovitica–Grubišno Polje road and northwest of Grubišno Polje on the first day of the offensive. On 4 November the operation was declared finished, after the HV secured the area.

== Follow-up operations ==
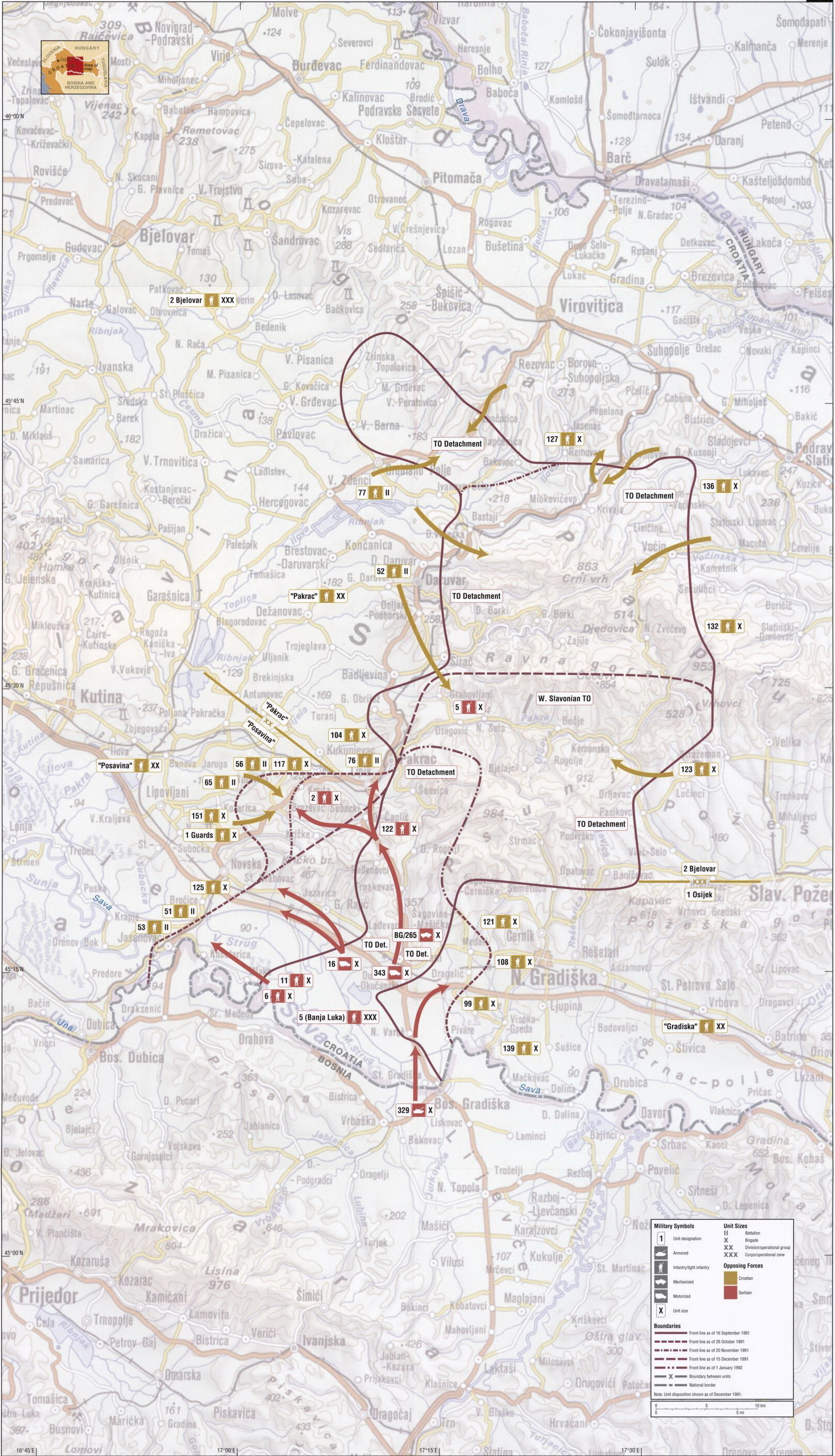
Map showing the fighting in western Slavonia, September 1991 – January 1992; Operation Swath-10 is depicted in the bulge (salient) near the top of the map; Operation Papuk-91, a follow-up to Operation Swath-10, is depicted in the central portion of the map

=== Battle of Bastajski Brđani ===
On 10 November the 57th Independent Battalion advanced against the TO in Veliki Miletinac (east of the area captured in Operation Swath-10), capturing the village the same day. The neighbouring Mali Miletinac was captured by the HV the following day, and on 12 November the HV captured the villages of Bastajski Brđani and Rekići. Two days later the TO counterattacked, killing nine HV troops and wounding about ten more, but the HV defence held. Another effort to recapture Bastajski Brđani was made by the TO, reinforced with 50 paramilitary White Eagles. It failed (despite being well prepared and supported by artillery) because the defending HV force was alerted by signals intelligence of the attack and reinforced. The White Eagles lost 46 killed in the battle.

=== Operation Papuk-91 ===
Operation Papuk-91 was planned to follow Operation Swath-10, advancing south from the Virovitica–Osijek road and clearing the Papuk and Psunj mountains of TO forces (elements of the 28th Partisan Division). The offensive was approved by Jezerčić at a 23 November meeting in Slatina attended by HV Inspector General Martin Špegelj, Colonel Miljenko Crnjac (commanding officer of the 123rd Infantry Brigade), Colonel Đuro Dečak (commanding officer of the 127th Infantry Brigade), Colonel Josip Černi (commanding officer of the 136th Infantry Brigade) and commanders of other units tasked with its support.

The operation was launched on 28 November; the HV advanced across a front spanning Grubišno Polje and Orahovica, nearly 60 kilometres (37 miles) east. On 2 December a detachment of the 123rd Infantry Brigade, en route to relieve troops manning a base on the Papuk, was ambushed with eleven soldiers killed. On 10 December the HV advanced to the Psunj Mountain area north of Nova Gradiška in an offensive, codenamed Gradina, which captured the villages of Šnjegavić, Sinlije, Golobrdac, Vučjak Čečavski, Ruševac, Jeminovac, Čečavac and Opršinac. The advance improved the safety of the Nova Gradiška–Požega road and secured the right flank of the Nova Gradiška axis of Operation Hurricane-91.

From 12 to 15 December the HV captured a cluster of villages around Đulovac, southeast of the area captured in Operation Swath-10. The HV units approaching from the east captured Voćin, about ten kilometres (6.2 miles) southeast of Đulovac, on 14–15 December. Voćin and Đulovac were badly damaged by the retreating TO and paramilitary White Eagles, and the latter killed 43 civilians in Voćin on 13 December. The victims' bodies were mutilated and left unburied, presumably as a warning to others.

On 16 December the HV (in an operation codenamed Sokolina) captured the villages of Gornji Vrhovci, Kamenski Vučjak and Kamenski Šušnjari, about 15 kilometres (9.3 miles) south of Voćin and 10 kilometres (6.2 miles) west of Velika; this restricted the TO forces to the southwestern slopes of Papuk Mountain and Psunj Mountain further south. The following day, the HV captured Novo Zvečevo and a TO supply depot in the village (halfway between Voćin and Kamenski Vučjak) in an attack codenamed Johanesberg. On 18 December the HV advanced southwest from Kamenski Vučjak (in an advance codenamed Laništa), capturing the villages of Striježevica, Bogdašić, Amatovci and Kamenski Šeovci and coming within one kilometre (0.62 miles) of the village of Kamenska (on the Pakrac–Požega road). Over the following three days, the HV performed mopping-up operations in the area.

On 21 December, the HV launched an unsuccessful attack (codenamed Prkos) on Kamenska and the adjacent village of Mijači. The TO withdrew from the area north of Kamenska (including the village of Sažije on 24 December), retreating from Kamenska and Mijači the next day. HV forces deployed in the Pakrac area (west of the Papuk and the Psunj), advanced east to support Operation Papuk-91 (capturing the villages of Dereza, Gornji Grahovljani, Donji Grahovljani, Kusonje and Španovica on 24–25 December) and left less than 15 kilometres (9.3 miles) of the Pakrac–Požega road separating HV units advancing from the west and east. Operation Papuk-91 ended on 26 December, when forces of the 123rd, the 127th and the 136th Brigades met at Bučje; the final day's advance was codenamed Velebit.

== Aftermath ==
Five HV soldiers were killed in the operation and dozens were wounded. Twenty-four JNA personnel and Croatian Serb rebels were also killed, as were 22 Serb civilians. A further 17 Serb civilians were killed in the weeks preceding the operation, in which Croatian forces secured 370 square kilometres (140 square miles) of western Slavonia (including 21 villages). Although the HV secured the Virovitica–Grubišno Polje road, it failed to trap the TO troops deployed to the area. This was later attributed to insufficient manpower: the unavailability of the 105th Infantry Brigade or the 73rd Independent (Garešnica) Battalion, which were deployed in Pakrac. The HV positions set the stage for further advances against the SAO Western Slavonia in Operation Papuk-91. Some sources conflate Operations Swath-10 and Papuk-91, describing the latter as part of Operation Swath-10. Operation Papuk-91 eliminated the threat to the road connecting eastern Slavonia and Zagreb; the TO forces were pushed south, placing the road out of artillery range. In Operation Papuk-91, the HV captured 110 settlements and 1,230 square kilometres (470 square miles) of territory.

In 2008, a monument to HV troops participating in the offensive was unveiled in Grubišno Polje. Another monument was erected on Papuk Mountain to the 11 soldiers from the 123rd Infantry Brigade who were ambushed in Operation Papuk-91 on 2 December 1991. Operations Swath-10, Papuk-91 and Hurricane-91 (implemented in western Slavonia in late 1991) are considered the first offensive liberation operations in the Croatian War of Independence.

The International Criminal Tribunal for the former Yugoslavia (ICTY) charged Vojislav Šešelj with a number of war crimes, including the killings by the paramilitary White Eagles in Voćin on 13 December. Although the trial ended in 2012, as of August 2013 the verdict was pending. Slobodan Milošević, the president of Serbia at the time of the killings, was also tried by the ICTY for the crimes in Voćin, but died before his trial ended.

=== Refugees ===
About 4,000 Croatian Serb civilians fled the area affected by Operation Swath-10. According to Serbian sources, the population began to evacuate on the first day of the offensive; by the second day, about 800 vehicles had entered Bosnia and Herzegovina. The retreating columns included men of military age who refused to fight. A substantial number of refugees settled in Baranja, in houses owned by displaced Croats. Based on reports of fleeing civilians, the Yugoslav government accused Croatia of ethnic cleansing and other civil-rights violations. Deputy Prime Minister Aleksandar Mitrović wrote to the European Community Monitor Mission (ECMM), accusing Croatia of personal and property damage and the displacement of Serb civilians. Although the accusations were countered by evacuation plans made by SAO Western Slavonia authorities on 25 October and the testimony of civilians remaining in the area (that the TO ordered the population to flee, claiming that "the Ustaše are coming [...] and killing every Serb"), Serbian media extensively reported alleged atrocities. Reports compared the Croatian offensive to the World War II massacres committed by the Independent State of Croatia. On 3 November, the Presidency of Yugoslavia condemned the offensive, citing the destruction of 18 Serb villages, and the following day the National Assembly of Serbia appealed to the international community for help.

In response to the situation (and a request from the Presidency of Yugoslavia) an ECMM team toured the area affected by the offensive on 6 November, targeting locations where media reports indicated atrocities; these included Velika Peratovica, Mala Peratovica, Gornja Rašenica, Donja Rašenica and Lončarica. The 6 November ECMM report refuted the accusations; although the team found only one Serb couple remaining in the area, they denied claims that the HV mistreated civilians left behind. The ECMM team reported no systematic destruction of houses, although a number of structures had artillery-bombardment damage and a small number of houses, farms and haystacks were recently torched. The team was unable to determine if the HV was to blame, if the villagers avenged SAO Western Krajina leaders or if the destruction was a result of a scorched earth policy by the retreating force.

The HV offensives in western Slavonia conducted in late 1991 (Operations Hurricane-10, Swath-10 and Papuk-91) created a total of 20,000 Serb refugees. They fled the area when the JNA ordered Croatian Serb forces to withdraw, and were settled in the JNA-held Baranja region of eastern Croatia. The refugee resettlement coincided with Croatian Serb efforts to change the ethnic composition of the Danube area seized in late 1991, providing a secondary motive for the expulsion of non-Serb civilians.

=== Ceasefire ===
A 3 January 1992 ceasefire allowed the implementation of the Vance plan, which protected civilians in areas designated as UN Protected Areas (UNPAs) and deployed UN peacekeepers in Croatia. One of the UNPAs defined by the plan, UNPA Western Slavonia, encompassed parts of the municipalities of Novska and Nova Gradiška and all of Daruvar, Grubišno Polje and Pakrac. This UNPA covered the area held by the JNA on 3 January, additional territory to the north (recaptured by the HV in late 1991) and towns never under SAO Western Slavonia control (such as Grubišno Polje and Daruvar). The peacekeeping force (United Nations Protection Force, or UNPROFOR), initially expected to be 10,000-strong, began its deployment on 8 March.
