= Subocka, Lipik =

Coordinates: 45°23′53″N 17°06′00″E

Subocka
- Village
- Interactive map of Subocka
- Country: Croatia
- County: Požega-Slavonia
- Town: Lipik

Area
  - Total: 16.0 km^{2} (6.2 sq mi)

Population (2021)
  - Total: 13
  - Density: 0.81/km^{2} (2.1/sq mi)
- Time zone: UTC+1 (CET)
  - Summer (DST): UTC+2 (CEST)

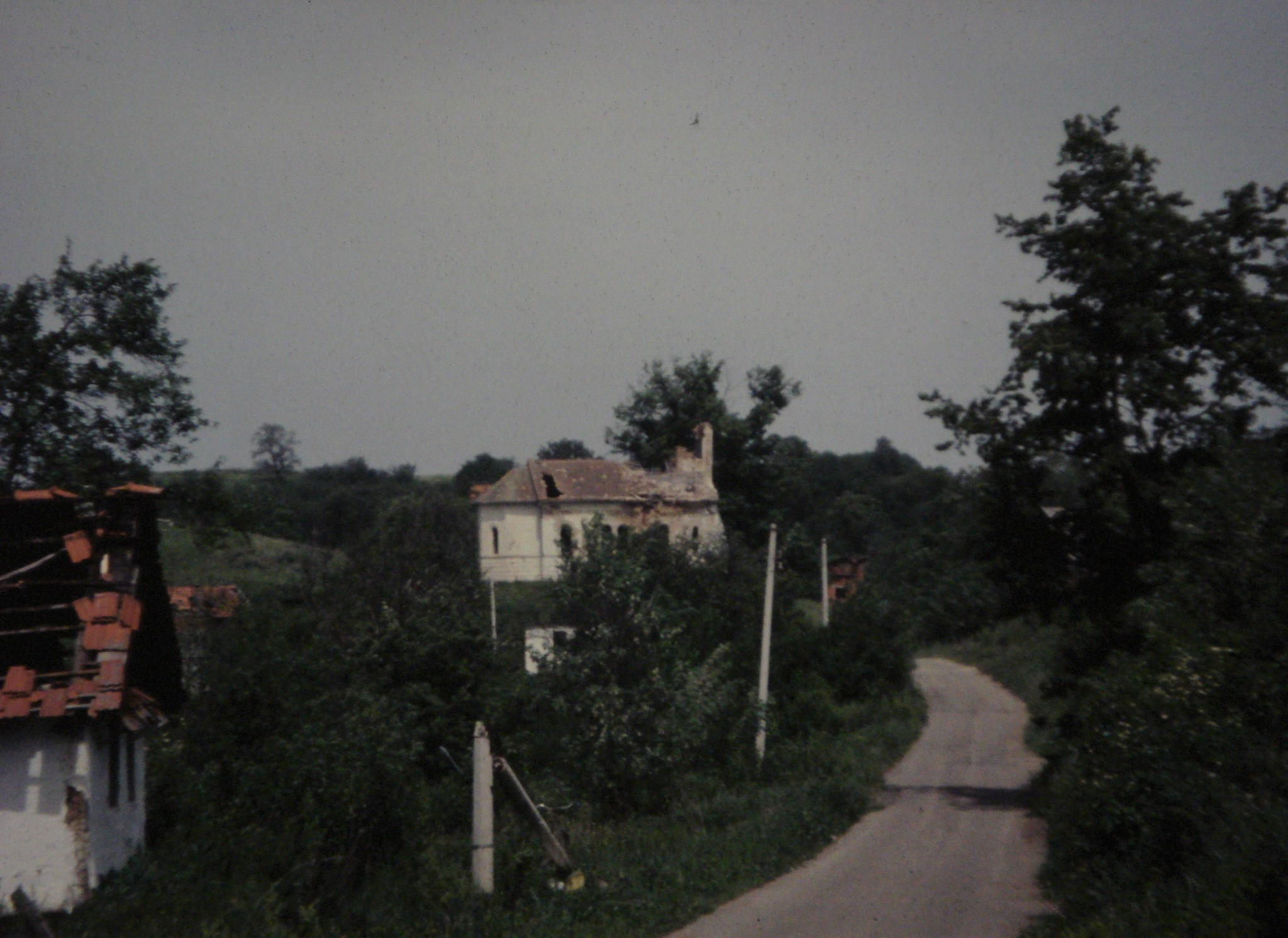
Subocka Church. Destroyed by fighting in 1991. Captured in mid-1994.

Subocka is a village in Croatia.
