= Kukunjevac =

Coordinates: 45°26′53″N 17°05′35″E

- Village
- Interactive map of Kukunjevac
- Country: Croatia
- County: Požega-Slavonia
- Municipality: Lipik

Area
  - Total: 24.7 km^{2} (9.5 sq mi)

Population (2021)
  - Total: 190
  - Density: 7.7/km^{2} (20/sq mi)
- Time zone: UTC+1 (CET)
  - Summer (DST): UTC+2 (CEST)

Kukunjevac is a village in Croatia.
