= Korita, Požega-Slavonia County =

Coordinates: 45°24′54″N 17°04′48″E

Korita, Croatia
- Village
- Interactive map of Korita, Croatia
- Country: Croatia
- County: Požega-Slavonia
- Municipality: Lipik

Area
  - Total: 6.6 km^{2} (2.5 sq mi)

Population (2021)
  - Total: 5
  - Density: 0.76/km^{2} (2.0/sq mi)
- Time zone: UTC+1 (CET)
  - Summer (DST): UTC+2 (CEST)

Korita, Croatia is a village in Croatia. It is connected by the D47 highway.
