= Jagma =

Coordinates: 45°25′05″N 17°06′30″E

- Village
- Interactive map of Jagma
- Country: Croatia
- County: Požega-Slavonia
- Municipality: Lipik

Area
  - Total: 4.8 km^{2} (1.9 sq mi)

Population (2021)
  - Total: 33
  - Density: 6.9/km^{2} (18/sq mi)
- Time zone: UTC+1 (CET)
  - Summer (DST): UTC+2 (CEST)

Jagma is a village in Croatia.
