= Lipik =

- Town
- Grad Lipik; Town of Lipik
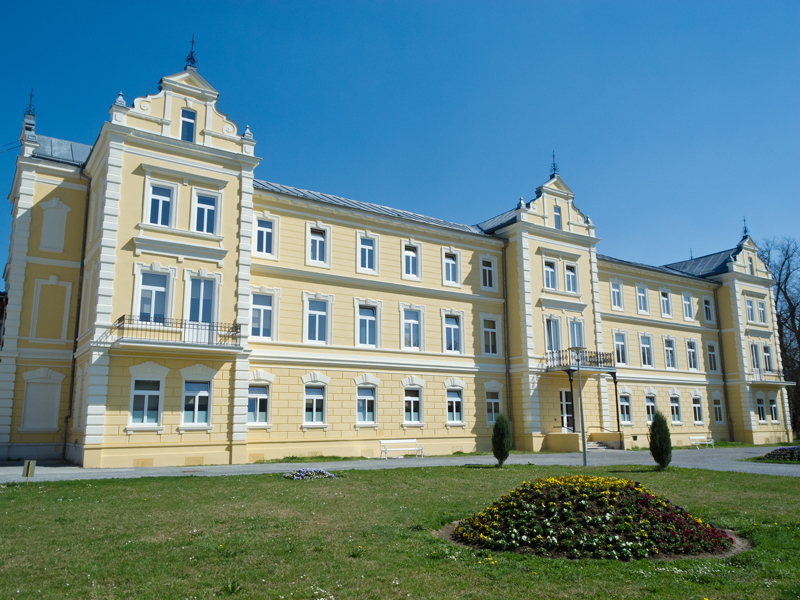
- Lipik Hospital
- Interactive map of Lipik
- Location of Lipik Croatia
- Coordinates: 45.415°N 17.16°E
- Country: Croatia
- Region: Slavonia (Požega Valley)
- County: Požega-Slavonia County

Government
  - Mayor: Vinko Kasana (HDZ)

Area
  - Town: 208.7 km^{2} (80.6 sq mi)
  - Urban: 7.9 km^{2} (3.1 sq mi)

Population (2021)
  - Town: 5,127
  - Density: 24.57/km^{2} (63.63/sq mi)
  - Urban: 1,967
  - Urban density: 250/km^{2} (640/sq mi)
- Time zone: UTC+1 (Central European Time)
- Postal codes: 34551 Lipik
- Vehicle registration: DA
- Website: lipik.hr

Lipik is a town in western Slavonia, in the Požega-Slavonia County of northeastern Croatia. It is known for its spas, mineral water and Lipizzaner stables.

== Settlements ==
The settlements included in the administrative area of Lipik include:

- Antunovac, population 363
- Bjelanovac, population 12
- Brekinska, population 126
- Brezine, population 221
- Bujavica, population 33
- Bukovčani, population 17
- Dobrovac, population 358
- Donji Čaglić, population 266
- Filipovac, population 373
- Gaj, population 324
- Gornji Čaglić, population 19
- Jagma, population 41
- Japaga, population 174
- Klisa, population 73
- Korita, population 9
- Kovačevac, population 29
- Kukunjevac, population 233
- Lipik, population 2,258
- Livađani, population 7
- Marino Selo, population 312
- Poljana, population 547
- Ribnjaci, population 34
- Skenderovci, population 4
- Strižičevac, population 18
- Subocka, population 12
- Šeovica, population 307
Town of Lipik: Population trends 1857–2021
v

| population | 5421 | 7068 | 8275 | 11553 | 12616 | 13909 | 13503 | 13786 | 11867 | 12290 | 12190 | 11651 | 11335 | 11222 | 6674 | 6170 | 5127 |
| | 1857 | 1869 | 1880 | 1890 | 1900 | 1910 | 1921 | 1931 | 1948 | 1953 | 1961 | 1971 | 1981 | 1991 | 2001 | 2011 | 2021 |

Sources: Croatian Bureau of Statistics publications

== Politics ==
=== Minority councils ===
Directly elected minority councils and representatives are tasked with consulting tasks for the local or regional authorities in which they are advocating for minority rights and interests, integration into public life and participation in the management of local affairs. At the 2023 Croatian national minorities councils and representatives elections Czechs, Serbs and Italians of Croatia each fulfilled legal requirements to elect 15 members minority council of the Town of Lipik but the elections for the Czech council were not held due to the lack of candidates.

== History ==
Lipik was occupied by Ottoman forces along with several other cities in Slavonia until its liberation in 1691.

In 1773, the warm waters of Lipik were described favorably by a Varaždin doctor. It continued to be used as a treatment spa for over a century, and in 1872, the first hotel was opened in the town. By 1920 the number of hotels grew to six. Spa treatment is still the major focus of economy for the town.

In the late 19th and early 20th century, Lipik was part of the Požega County of the Kingdom of Croatia-Slavonia.

During Croatian war of independence Lipik was liberated along with surrounding areas by Croatian Army in Operation Orada

== Climate ==
Since records began in 1981, the highest temperature recorded at the local weather station was 40.8 °C (105.4 °F), on 10 August 2017. The coldest temperature was −23.3 °C (−9.9 °F), on 12 January 1985.

Climate data for Lipik
| Month | Jan | Feb | Mar | Apr | May | Jun | Jul | Aug | Sep | Oct | Nov | Dec | Year |
|---|---|---|---|---|---|---|---|---|---|---|---|---|---|
| Mean daily maximum °C (°F) | 3 (38) | 6 (42) | 11 (52) | 17 (63) | 22 (71) | 26 (78) | 28 (83) | 27 (81) | 23 (73) | 17 (62) | 11 (52) | 4 (39) | 16 (61) |
| Mean daily minimum °C (°F) | −4 (24) | −4 (24) | 0 (32) | 4 (40) | 9 (48) | 12 (53) | 13 (56) | 12 (54) | 9 (49) | 6 (42) | 3 (37) | −3 (27) | 5 (41) |
| Average precipitation cm (inches) | 5.1 (2) | 5.3 (2.1) | 6.4 (2.5) | 6.6 (2.6) | 9.1 (3.6) | 8.1 (3.2) | 7.4 (2.9) | 8.4 (3.3) | 8.4 (3.3) | 11 (4.4) | 8.4 (3.3) | 6.6 (2.6) | 91 (35.8) |
Source: Weatherbase

== Lipizzan stable ==
Lipik also hosts a Lipizzan stable that had been built in 1843 under the Habsburg monarchy. It had previously enjoyed state recognition in Yugoslavia between 1938 and the 1950s, when it was closed in favor of the stable in Lipica, Slovenia. It was reopened in 1981, but then during the Croatian War of Independence the horses were evacuated and taken to Novi Sad, Serbia, where they remained until their negotiated return in 2007.

== Notable natives and residents ==
- Vladimir Velmar-Janković, Serb writer
- Jadranka Kosor, former Croatian Prime Minister
