= Dobrovac =

Coordinates: 45°26′N 17°07′E

- Village
- Interactive map of Dobrovac
- Country: Croatia
- County: Požega-Slavonia
- Municipality: Lipik

Area
  - Total: 4.6 km^{2} (1.8 sq mi)

Population (2021)
  - Total: 304
  - Density: 66/km^{2} (170/sq mi)
- Time zone: UTC+1 (CET)
  - Summer (DST): UTC+2 (CEST)

Dobrovac (German: Oberkersch) is a village in Croatia. It is connected by the D47 highway.

== History ==
The Regulation and Decree of December 31, 1858 renewed the Austrian Empire call for agricultural settlement across Croatia and Slavonia. Rules included a minimum of 50 families per settlement, with all settlers sharing one nationality and one religion. Dobrovac was among ten villages founded by German-speaking Danube Swabians, with settlers arriving from the Kingdom of Hungary. It was established in 1866 and the contract between the settlers and noble was ratified in 1881. Dobrovac was carved from heavily forested wilderness, and clearing the land was the settlers' first major task.
