= D30 road (Croatia) =

Road in Croatia

D30 state road

Route information
- Length: 79.7 km (49.5 mi)

Major junctions
- From: A3 in Kosnica interchange
- D408 near Velika Gorica; D31 near Velika Gorica; D36 near Žažina; D37 in Petrinja; D224 in Panjani; D47 in Hrvatska Kostajnica
- To: Hrvatska Kostajnica border crossing to Bosnia and Herzegovina

Location
- Country: Croatia
- Counties: Zagreb County, Sisak-Moslavina
- Major cities: Velika Gorica, Petrinja, Hrvatska Kostajnica

Highway system
- Highways in Croatia

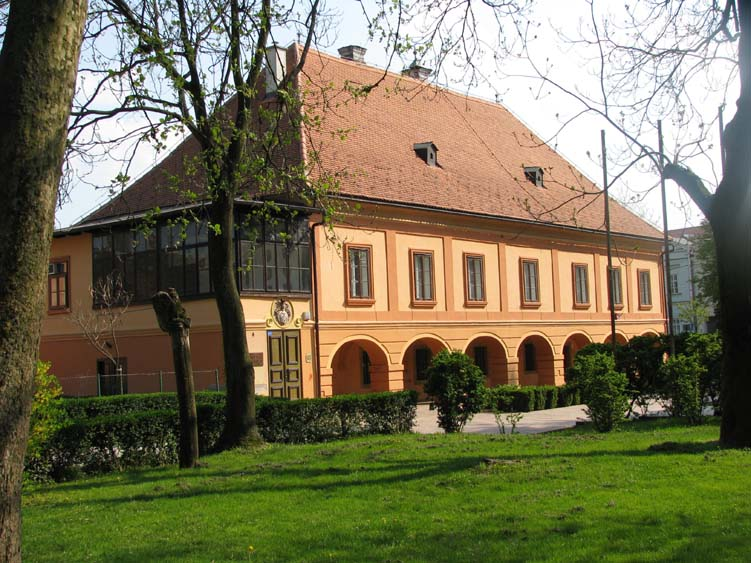
Velika Gorica, on the D30 road route

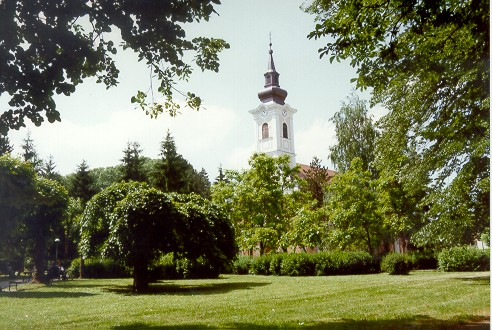
Petrinja, on the D30 road route

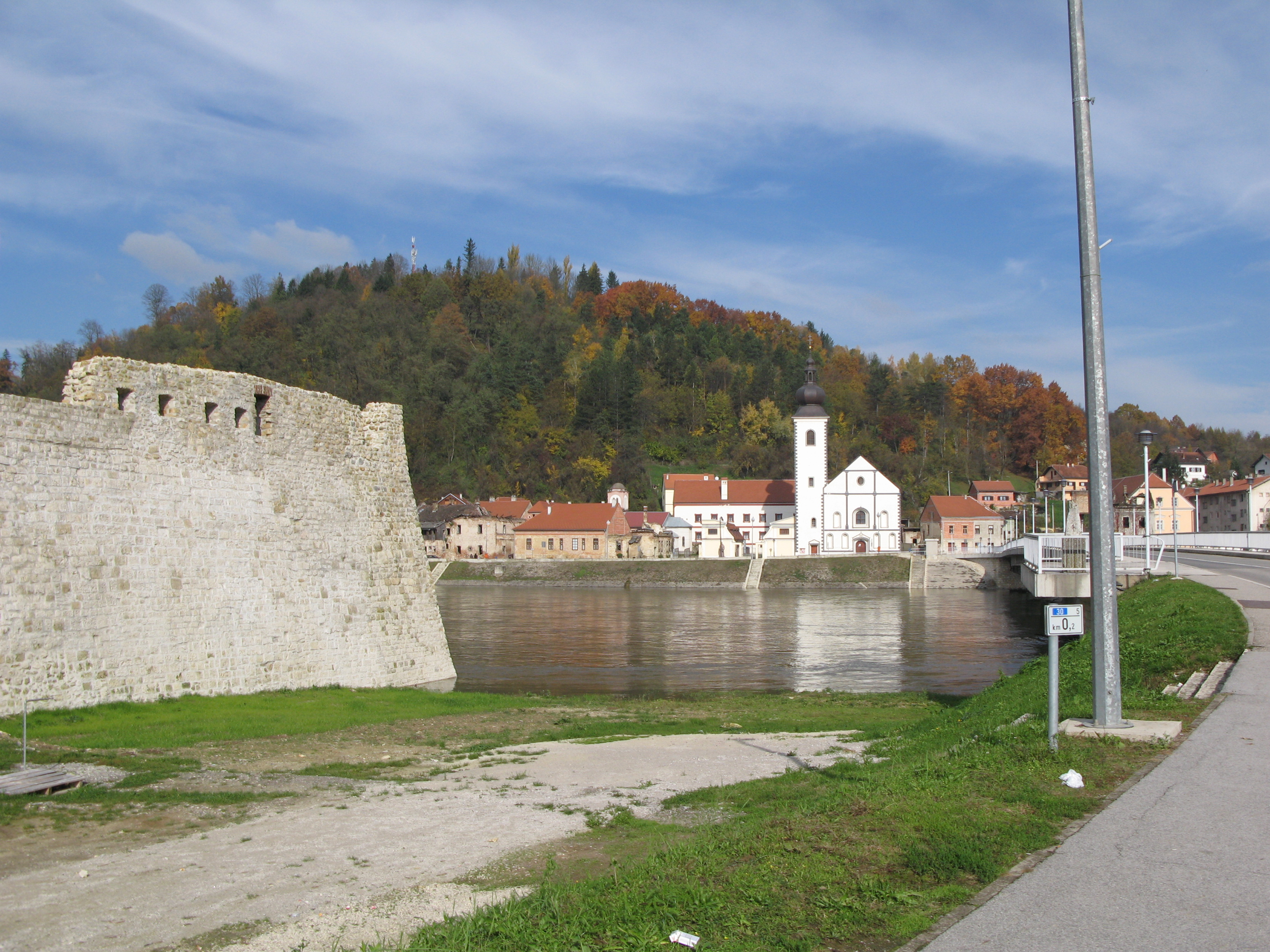
Hrvatska Kostajnica, at the southern terminus of the D30 road

D30 is a state road in central Croatia connecting Velika Gorica, Petrinja and Hrvatska Kostajnica to Croatian motorway network at the A3 motorway Kosnica interchange and to the City of Zagreb via Radnička Road. The road is 79.7 km (49.5 mi) long.

As with all state roads in Croatia, the D30 is managed and maintained by Hrvatske ceste, state owned company.

== Traffic volume ==
Traffic is regularly counted and reported by Hrvatske ceste, operator of the road. Sections of the road running through Velika Gorica and Petrinja are not covered by the traffic counting sites, but the section is assumed to carry a substantial volume of urban traffic in addition to the regular D30 traffic.

D30 traffic volume
Road	Counting site	AADT	ASDT	Notes
D30	2014 Velika Mlaka	37,260	35,160	Between the Ž3109 and D408 junctions.
D30	2035 Velika Gorica northern bypass	7,958	7,119	Adjacent to the D408 junction.
D30	2019 Lekenik	8,469	8,547	Adjacent to the Ž3230 junction.
D30	2020 Žažina	8,439	8,600	Between the D36 and Ž3156 junctions.
D30	3208 Petrinja - north	4,718	5,306	Between the Ž3242 and D37 junctions.
D30	3205 Budičina	2,034	2,583	Adjacent to the Ž3201 junction.
D30	3311 Hrvatska Kostajnica	3,080	3,464	Adjacent to the D224 junction.

== Road junctions and populated areas ==
D30 junctions/populated areas
Type	Slip roads/Notes
	Kosnica interchange A3 to Slavonski Brod and Varaždin (via the A4 motorway) (to the east) and to Karlovac (via the A1 motorway) and Krapina (via the A2 motorway) (to the west). To Zagreb via Radnička Road. Both the D31 to the south of the interchange and Radnička Road to the north are double carriage roads The northern terminus of the road.
	D408 to Velika Gorica and Zagreb Airport.
	D31 to Pokupsko and Glina (D6). To Velika Gorica via Sisačka street. The southern terminus of the suburban double carriage road.
	Vukovina
	Buševec
	Ogulinec
	Peščenica; Ž3151 to Brežane Lekeničke and Cerje. Ž3292 to Peščenica railway station.
	Lekenik
	Ž3230 to Poljana Lekenička
	Dužica; Ž3157 to Greda.
	D36 to Pokupsko and Karlovac (to the west). The D30 and D36 roads are concurrent to the south of the junction.
	Ž3156 to Žažina
	D36 to Sisak and A3 motorway Popovača interchange (to the east). The D30 and D36 roads are concurrent to the north of the junction.
	Ž3156 to Mala Gorica
	Brest Pokupski; Ž3242 to Vurot, Stara Drenčina and Staro Pračno.
	D37 to Glina. The D30 and D37 roads are concurrent to the east of the junction.
	Petrinja; D37 to Sisak . The D30 and D37 roads are concurrent to the west of the junction. Ž3200 to D37 state road.
	Donja Budičina
	Ž3201 to Donja Mlinoga
	Moštanica
	Blinja; Ž3208 to Mađari.
	Bijelnik
	Ž3240 to Gornja Mlinoga
	Ž3244 to Mala Gradusa and Drljača.
	Knezovljani
	Umetić
	Ž3241 to Mečenčani and Borojevići.
	Donji Kukuruzari
	Panjani; D224 to Sunja and Mošćenica (D37).
	Hrvatska Kostajnica; D47 to Dvor, Hrvatska Dubica and the A3 motorway Novska interchange.
	Hrvatska Kostajnica border crossing to Bosnia and Herzegovina. The road extends to Bosanska Kostajnica, Bosnia and Herzegovina. The southern terminus of the road.
1.000 mi = 1.609 km; 1.000 km = 0.621 mi: Unopened
