= A11 (Croatia) =

Motorway in Croatia

A11 motorway
- Autocesta A11
- Autocesta Zagreb - Sisak
- in use under construction planned other motorways

Route information
- Length: 41 km (25 mi)

Major junctions
- North end: A3 near Velika Gorica
- South end: D30 near Poljana Lekenička

Location
- Country: Croatia
- Counties: Zagreb County, City of Zagreb, Sisak-Moslavina County
- Major cities: Velika Gorica

Highway system
- Highways in Croatia

The A11 motorway (Croatian: Autocesta A11) is a motorway in Croatia, 30 kilometres (19 miles) long. It connects the Jakuševec interchange of the Zagreb bypass, to the south of Zagreb, to Velika Gorica and onwards to Sisak, but currently reaches only the Lekenik exit, as of the planned 42-kilometre (26 mi) route, 30 km (19 mi) are completed. The motorway is planned as a north–south transportation corridor for commuter traffic between the cities.

The A11 motorway tender procedures and construction works were initiated in 2006. After several delays attributed to planning and land ownership issues, as well as funding and lack of political support, the first section of the A11 was opened in 2009, just 9 kilometres (5.6 miles) long. The delays continued to hinder progress of development of the route, and in 2010 construction works were restarted. The A11 motorway construction was criticized as too expensive in comparison to other Croatian motorways and as a site of political promotion and bickering. In November 2015, the A11 was first connected to the national motorway network at the Jakuševec interchange, which serves as its connection to the A3 motorway. As of 2016, the motorway does not have a scheduled completion date.

The motorway consists of two traffic lanes and an emergency lane in each driving direction separated by a central reservation. Both intersections of the A11 motorway are grade separated. As of January 2016, there are five exits along the route, and one rest area. The motorway is tolled on the sections south of Velika Gorica using a ticket system, while the remainder is toll-free, like the rest of the Zagreb and Velika Gorica bypass roads.

== Route description ==
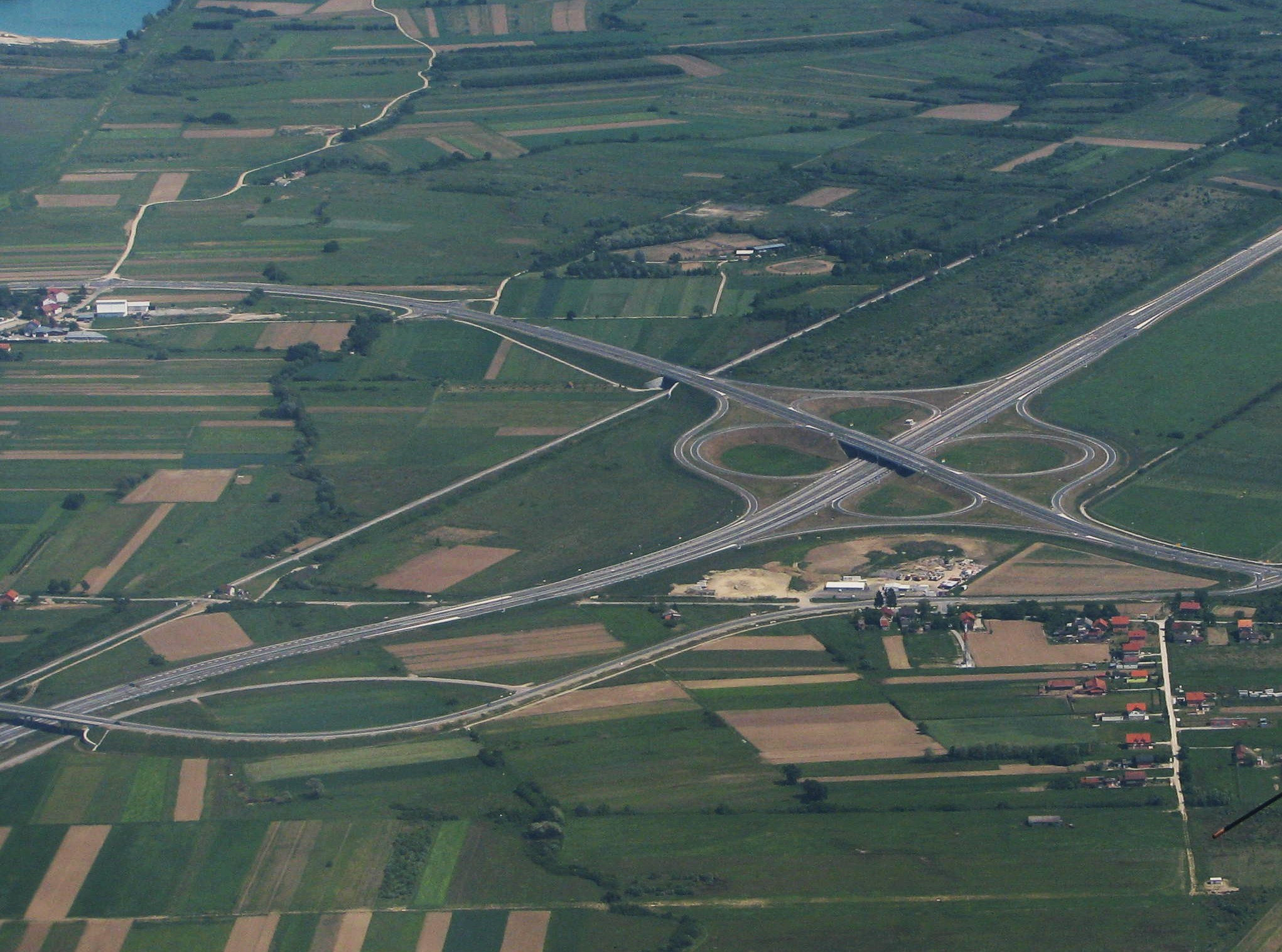
Velika Gorica jug interchange

The A11 motorway is an incomplete north–south motorway in Croatia, spanning D30 and D31 state roads south of Velika Gorica. The designed motorway route is of regional importance as it is planned to gradually take over traffic from state road network in the area, especially the D30 which carries a significant commuter traffic volume between Zagreb, Velika Gorica and Sisak. As of January 2016, 30 kilometres (19 miles) of the route are open to traffic, connecting the D31 and the D30 roads at Velika Gorica and Poljana Lekenička exits respectively. The D30 and the D31 have a shared intersection in Velika Gorica itself, providing an alternative route to the motorway section. Legally designated termini of the A11 motorway are the Jakuševec interchange on the Zagreb bypass and Sisak.

The A11 motorway has at least two traffic lanes and an emergency lane in each direction along its entire length. The Velika Gorica interchange is a cloverleaf interchange. The A11 route is not tolled from Jakuševec up to the Mraclin mainline toll plaza, after which point it is tolled at the Buševec and Lekenik exits, which comprise trumpet interchanges.

An automatic traffic monitoring and guidance system is in place along the motorway. It consists of measuring, control and signaling devices located in zones where driving conditions may vary, such as at interchanges, viaducts, bridges and zones where fog and strong wind are known to occur. The system uses variable traffic signs to communicate changing driving conditions, possible restrictions and other information to motorway users. The A11 motorway mainly runs through a plain, south of Sava River, requiring no major structures except for the exit interchanges themselves.

== History ==
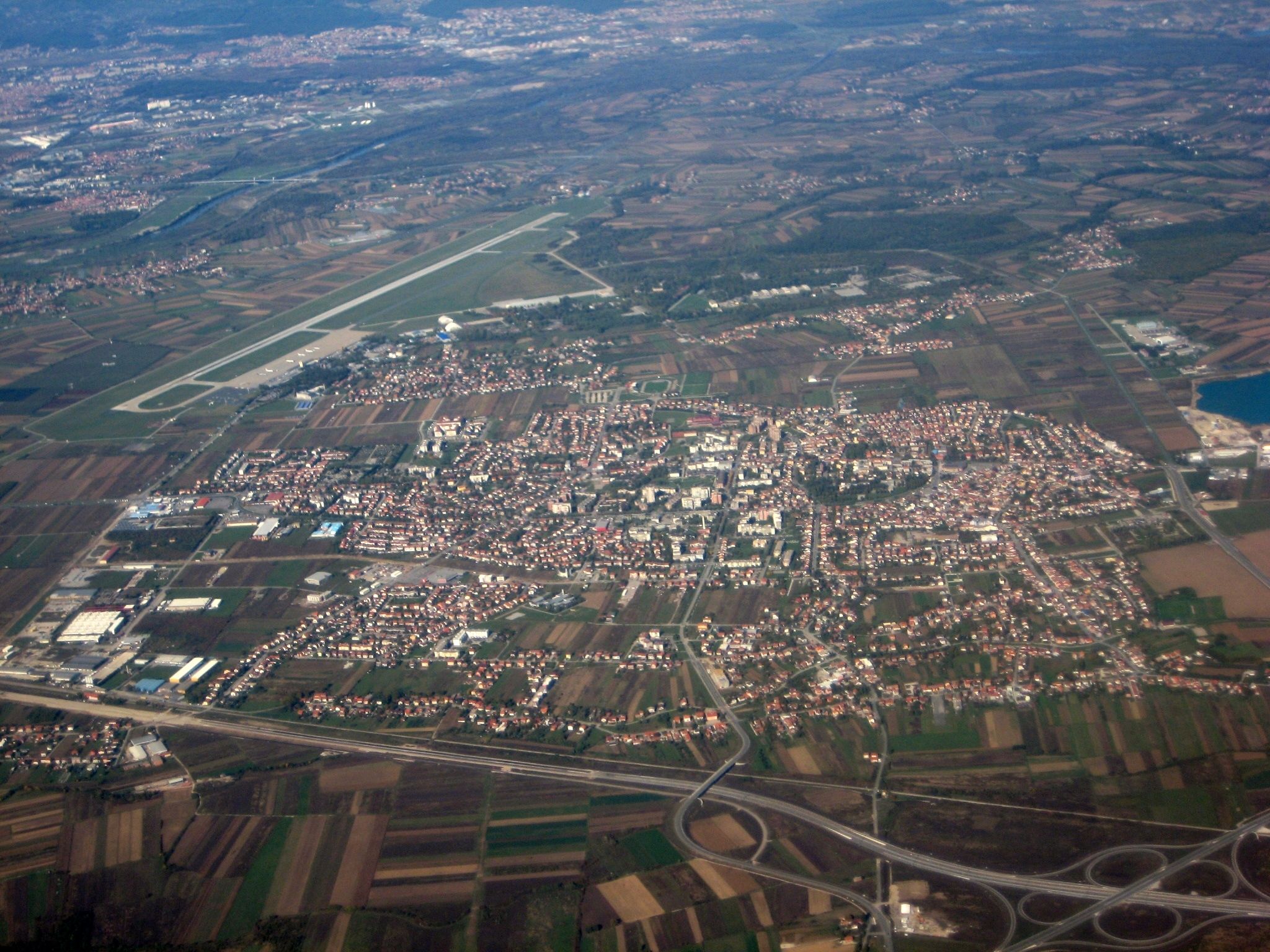
Velika Gorica jug interchange and the A11 route (bottom) approaching the A3 motorway (left) as it passes Zagreb Airport

The Zagreb–Sisak motorway was defined as a priority traffic route by the Government of Croatia in Motorway development plan for the 2005–2008 period. The route defined at the time fully complied with county development plans, except in a 4-kilometre (2.5 mi) segment south of the Zagreb bypass, which required changes of the spatial planning documents of the City of Zagreb and the Zagreb County. Hrvatske autoceste developed a preliminary study of the route, proposing to connect the A11 to Zagreb at the Zagreb bypass and the Sarajevska Road, requiring a tunnel below Zagreb railway shunting yard. The plan also required moving the A3 motorway Buzin interchange approximately 2.5 kilometres (1.6 miles) to the west. The plans refer to the moved interchange as Sveta Klara interchange. That scheme planned completion of the motorway to the south of Velika Gorica by 2007, to Lekenik by 2008 and later on to Sisak. At the time the cost of the first section between Velika Gorica and Buševec was estimated at 328 million kuna (44.3 million euro), and the extension to Lekenik was valued at 586 million kuna (79.1 million euro). In February and March 2006, Government of Croatia performed tender procedure for the 8.3-kilometre (5.2 mi) northernmost section of the A11 spanning the Jakuševec interchange and the Velika Gorica jug exit. At the time, the cost of the section was estimated at 770 million kuna (104 million euro) and the construction works were scheduled to be completed by June 15, 2007. On April 4, commencement of the works between the Velika Gorica jug interchange and Hrašće Turopoljsko was announced. The contract was won by a joint venture comprising Viadukt, Hidroelektra, Konstruktor and Strabag, at a price of 202 million kuna (27.3 million euro) without VAT, and the works were scheduled to be completed by June 15, 2007.

The first indication of delays came in March 2007, when the national government started trading accusations with authorities of the Zagreb County. The government accused the county authorities of willfully slowing down the project as the county failed to adopt required amendments of their spatial planning documents. In turn, the county accused the government of insufficient project funding and that accusations levied by the central government were intended to disguise lack of money. This situation led to announcements made in 2008, that the motorway would be built from the direction of Sisak, however that was not immediately feasible as land was not purchased and construction design had to be adjusted. Even so, the works were announced to start north of Sisak at the beginning of 2009. The plan to start construction in 2009 from Sisak were confirmed in July 2008, when Hrvatske autoceste denied rumors that the route may be shortened to the northern outskirts of Sisak, instead of Mošćenica suburb of Petrinja located immediately to the south of Sisak. By August 2008, the planning of a tunnel under Zagreb shunting yard was abandoned in favor of a viaduct extending to the north of the planned Jakuševec interchange. Construction of the latter started shortly afterwards, but stalled.

On May 9, 2009, the first section of the A11 motorway was completed and opened to traffic, spanning Velika Gorica and Buševec exits. The section is 9 kilometres (5.6 miles) long, and contains 6 bridges, 4 flyovers, 2 wildlife crossings, a viaduct and an underpass. Total cost of the section was reported to be 657 million kuna (88.8 million euro). At the opening ceremony, it was announced that the entire route between Zagreb and Mošćenica shall be completed by 2011. In May 2009, new construction contracts were made for the Buševec–Sisak section of the route, only to be cancelled in September of the same year. The cancellation was attributed to change of funding sources and models, and new contracts were announced for November 2009.

Since the opening of the first A11 motorway section, the project was criticized by political opposition parties as excessively expensive, citing estimated cost of 14.8 million euro per kilometer and comparing it to cost of somewhat more than 4 million euro per kilometer cost of the A1 motorway to Split. Hrvatske autoceste, operator of the motorway, defended the price as a result of unfavorable, silty ground along the route requiring large quantities of backfill and transportation of the backfill material. Furthermore, Hrvatske autoceste rejected the claims of cost per kilometer of the A11 and the A1. The company which operates both of the motorways claimed that the average price of the A1 motorway was 7.1 million euro per kilometer and that the average cost per kilometer of the A11 stands at 11.3 million euro, further citing high transport cost of the backfill material caused by remote location of the closest quarry which is approximately 100 kilometres (62 miles) away. Construction of the A11 motorway was also criticized as an example of interference of politics in road construction, where construction sites are perceived as generally serving as ribbon-cutting ceremony sites during election campaigns.

In April 2010, the entire A11 motorway route between Zagreb bypass and Sisak, at the time with the planned length of 47.9-kilometre (29.8 mi), was planned to be completed within two and a half years, at a cost of 5.1 billion kuna (689 million euro).

Construction works on the 11.2-kilometre (7.0 mi) Buševec–Lekenik section commenced in April 2010, when completion of the section was announced for 2011. The section required construction of two bridges, six flyovers, four culverts, Lekenik toll plaza and Peščenica rest area. The construction works contract was awarded to Konstruktor, Hidroelektra and Osijek Koteks. Value of the contract works is 645 million kuna (87.1 million euro), including VAT. The subsection was opened for traffic in April 2015, and the cost was 700 million kuna (about 95 million euro), excluding VAT, and was to date the most expensive motorway ever built by Croatian Motorways Ltd.

The 11-kilometre (6.8 mi) Jakuševec–Velika Gorica jug section of the A11 spans Zagreb suburban area and its completion was repeatedly delayed due to changes of legislation, land acquisition and funding issues. In November 2015, that section of the motorway was opened, connecting the Jakuševec and Velika Gorica jug interchanges, at a total cost of 1.645 billion kuna (222.2 million euro). The section contains some of the most significant structures on the route, a 743-metre (2,438 ft) Odra Viaduct that spans a railway and a road, and a 322-metre (1,056 ft) bridge crossing the Sava-Odra Canal. The Jakuševec – Velika Gorica section is part of a system of roads constructed to bypass the city of Velika Gorica.

== Further construction ==
The future access road to the A11 from the direction of Zagreb via the Sarajevska street and onto the Jakuševec interchange will require a large overpass to span the width of the Croatian Railways marshalling station located there, and as of 2015 preparatory investments were being made.

In the Lekenik–Sisak section, preparatory works first commenced in 2011, entailing relocation of utilities along the planned motorway route. In May 2012, Hrvatske autoceste proposed cancellation of construction works south of Lekenik. Later the plans were restored, but the total investment in the section remained relatively small, in 2015 only 623,000 kuna (84,189 euro).

The plans for finishing this motorway has been restored on the start of 2021, when government announced that project will be over in 2023. Construction of 11 km motorway will cost 300.000.000 Croatian kuna (40.000.000 Euros) and will be over in 2 years from start of work.

When completed, the A11 shall be tolled between Velika Gorica jug exit and Sisak, unlike the sections between Velika Gorica jug and Jakuševec interchanges which shall remain toll free as a part of the Zagreb bypass.

Ultimately, when completed the A11 is planned to have eight interchanges, as well as a 270-metre (890 ft) arch bridge spanning the Kupa River, and a 710-metre (2,330 ft) viaduct north of the Jakuševec interchange, across the Zagreb shunting yard.

== Traffic volume ==
Traffic is regularly counted and reported by Hrvatske autoceste, operator of the motorway, and results are published by Hrvatske ceste. In 2015, the traffic count sites on the A11 motorway route were located at the Mraclin mainline toll site and at the Buševec exit. Both sites recorded the annual average daily traffic (AADT) and the average summer daily traffic (ASDT).

A11 traffic volume details
Road	Counting site	AADT	ASDT	Notes
A11	2031 Mraclin - jug	1,985	1,636	
A11	2047 Buševec	1,784	1,480	

The section of the A11 between Velika Gorica jug and Jakuševec interchanges, which was completed in November 2015, is expected to start carrying a substantially increased volume of traffic compared to the existing A11 route because it is expected to take over a significant portion of the D30 state road traffic. The D30 state road, parallel to the Jakuševec–Velika Gorica jug section of the A11 carries estimated AADT of 31,458 vehicles, measured at Velika Mlaka north of Velika Gorica. The Kurilovec counting site south of Velika Gorica, located near the Velika Gorica jug interchange, carries AADT of 4,721 vehicles.

== Exit list ==
County	km	Exit	Name	Destination	Notes
City of Zagreb	0.0	1	Jakuševec	A3 E70	Connection to the A3 motorway and the Zagreb bypass
City of Zagreb	1.0	2	Veliko Polje		Connection to Odra and Mlaka
Zagreb County	2.3	3	Velika Gorica sjever (north)	D30	Connection to Velika Gorica
Zagreb County	8.7	4	Velika Gorica jug (south)	D31	Connection to Velika Gorica
Zagreb County	12.1		Mraclin toll plaza		
Zagreb County	18.1	5	Buševec	Ž3116	Connection to Buševec and the D30 state road
Sisak-Moslavina	23.8	Parking area traffic sign	Pešćenica rest area		
Sisak-Moslavina	29.4	6	Lekenik	D30 Ž3230	Connection to Lekenik and Poljana Lekenička; As of November 2015.
Sisak-Moslavina	35.0	7	Žažina	D30 D36	Planned connection to Žažina and Petrinja
Sisak-Moslavina	38.2		Sisak toll plaza		Not toll plaza; Opening in October 2024.
Sisak-Moslavina	41.0	8	Sela	D36	Connection to Sela and Sisak; Opening in October 2024, the southern terminus
1.000 mi = 1.609 km; 1.000 km = 0.621 mi: Unopened

== See also ==
- International E-road network
- Transport in Croatia
