= Borojevići, Croatia =

Borojevići Боројевићи (Serbian)
- Village
- Location within Croatia
- Coordinates: 45°17′46″N 16°24′32″E
- Country: Croatia
- Region: Continental Croatia (Banovina)
- County: Sisak-Moslavina
- Municipality: Donji Kukuruzari

Area
  - Total: 5.5 sq mi (14.3 km^{2})

Population (2021)
  - Total: 68
  - Density: 12/sq mi (4.8/km^{2})
- Time zone: UTC+1 (CET)
  - Summer (DST): UTC+2 (CEST)

Borojevići (Serbian: Боројевићи) is a village in Croatia, located on the right side of river Sunja, between Komogovina and Mečenčani.

In the 2011 census, there were 119 inhabitants. According to the 1991 census, Serbs were almost absolute majority 288 (97.95%), then Croats 2 (0.68%), Yugoslavs 2 (0.68%) and others 2 (0.68%).
