= Peščenica =

Peščenica may refer to:

- Peščenica or Stara Peščenica, a neighborhood of Zagreb, Croatia
- Peščenica – Žitnjak, a city district of Zagreb
- Republic of Peščenica, a fictional state located in Zagreb

== See also ==
- Pešćenica, Sisak-Moslavina County, a village in Croatia
