= Sunja =

Sunja may refer to:

- Sunja, Sisak-Moslavina County, a village and municipality in Croatia
- Sunja (Sava), a river in Croatia
- Sunja River or Sunzha River, a river in Russia
- Sunja (name), a Korean given name
