= Eparchy of Gornji Karlovac =

Diocese of the Serbian Orthodox Church

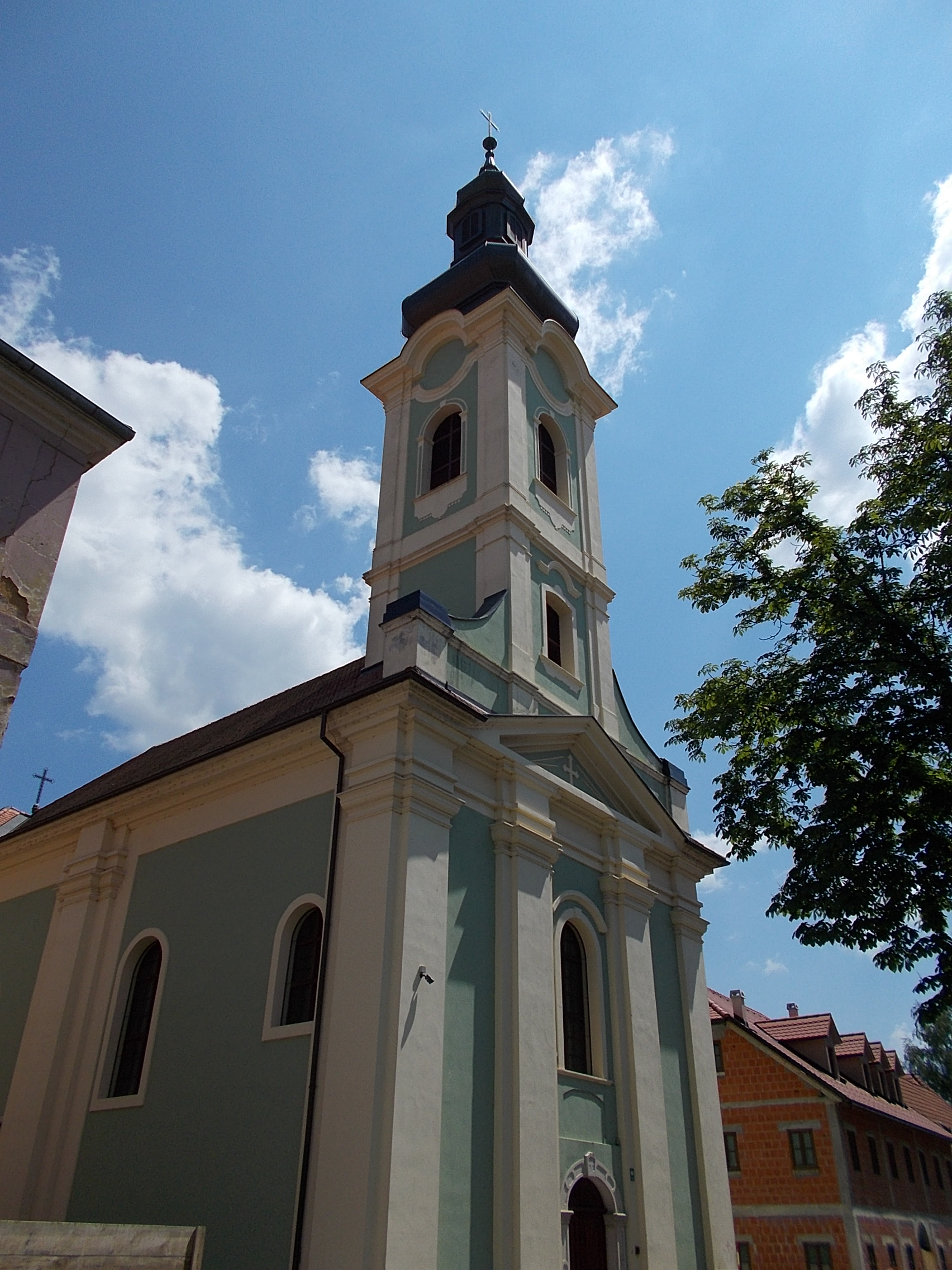
- Saint Nicholas Cathedral, Karlovac

Location
- Territory: Banovina, Kordun, Lika, Gorski Kotar, Croatian Littoral, Istria
- Headquarters: Karlovac, Croatia

Information
- Denomination: Eastern Orthodox
- Sui iuris church: Serbian Orthodox Church
- Established: 1695
- Cathedral: Saint Nicholas Cathedral, Karlovac
- Language: Church Slavonic, Serbian

Current leadership
- Bishop: Gerasim Popović

Map

Website
- Eparchy of Gornji Karlovac

The Eparchy of Gornji Karlovac (Serbian Cyrillic: Епархија горњокарловачка, Croatian: Eparhija gornjokarlovačka; lit. "Eparchy of Upper Karlovac") is a diocese (eparchy) of the Serbian Orthodox Church, covering Banovina, Kordun, Lika, Gorski Kotar, Croatian Littoral, and Istria.

The episcopal see is located at the Saint Nicholas Cathedral, Karlovac. Its headquarters and bishop's residence are also in Karlovac.

== History ==
The Eparchy of Lika, Krbava, and Zrinopolje was established in 1695 by the Metropolitan Atanasije Ljubojević and certified by Emperor Joseph I in 1707. This eparchy (from the 19th century known as the Eparchy of Upper Karlovac) was the ecclesiastical centre of the Serbian Orthodox Church in the region.

The eparchy was under jurisdiction of the Metropolitan of Dabar and Bosnia, directly under the restored Serbian Patriarchate of Peć and after 1766 under the new Serbian Metropolitanate of Karlovci, comprising Lika, Banovina and Kordun.

In 1993 the Saint Nicholas Cathedral Cathedral and the bishop's residence were destroyed by Croatian forces during the Croatian War of Independence.

== List of bishops ==
- Atanasije Ljubojević (1688–1712)
- Danilo Ljubotina (1713–1739)
- Pavle Nenadović (1744–1749)
- Danilo Jakšić (1751–1771)
- Josif Stojanović (1771–1774)
- Petar Petrović (1774–1784)
- Jovan Jovanović (1783–1786)
- Genadije Dimović (1786–1796)
- Stefan Avakumović (1798–1801)
- Petar Jovanović Vidak (1801–1806)
- Mojsije Mioković (1807–1823)
- Lukijan Mušicki (1828–1837)
- Evgenije Jovanović (1839–1854)
- Sergije Kaćanski (1858–1859)
- Petar Jovanović (1859–1864)
- Lukijan Nikolajević (1865–1872)
- Teofan Živković (1874–1890)
- Mihailo Grujić (1891–1914)
- Ilarion Zeremski (1920–1931)
- Maksimilijan Hajdin (1931–1936)
- Sava Trlajić (1938–1941)
- Nikanor Iličić (1947–1951)
- Simeon Zloković (1951–1990)
- Nikanor Bogunović (1991–1999)
- Fotije Sladojević (2000–2004)
- Gerasim Popović (2004–present)

== Notable monasteries ==
- Gomirje
- Komogovina

== Gallery ==
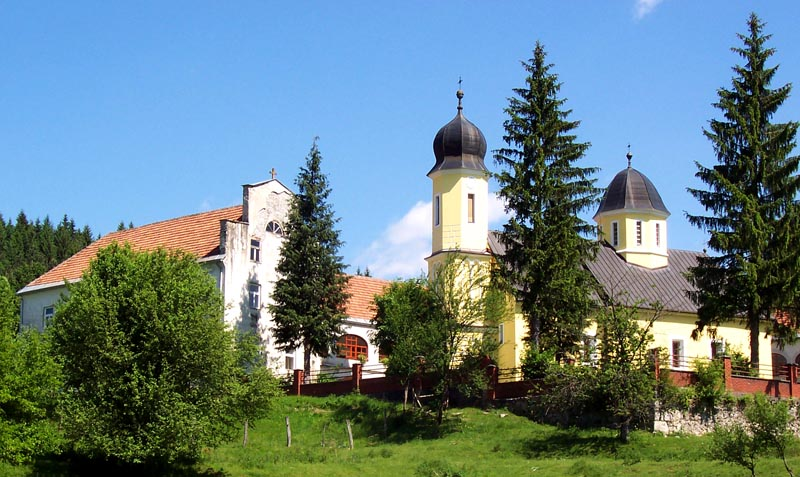
Gomirje Monastery

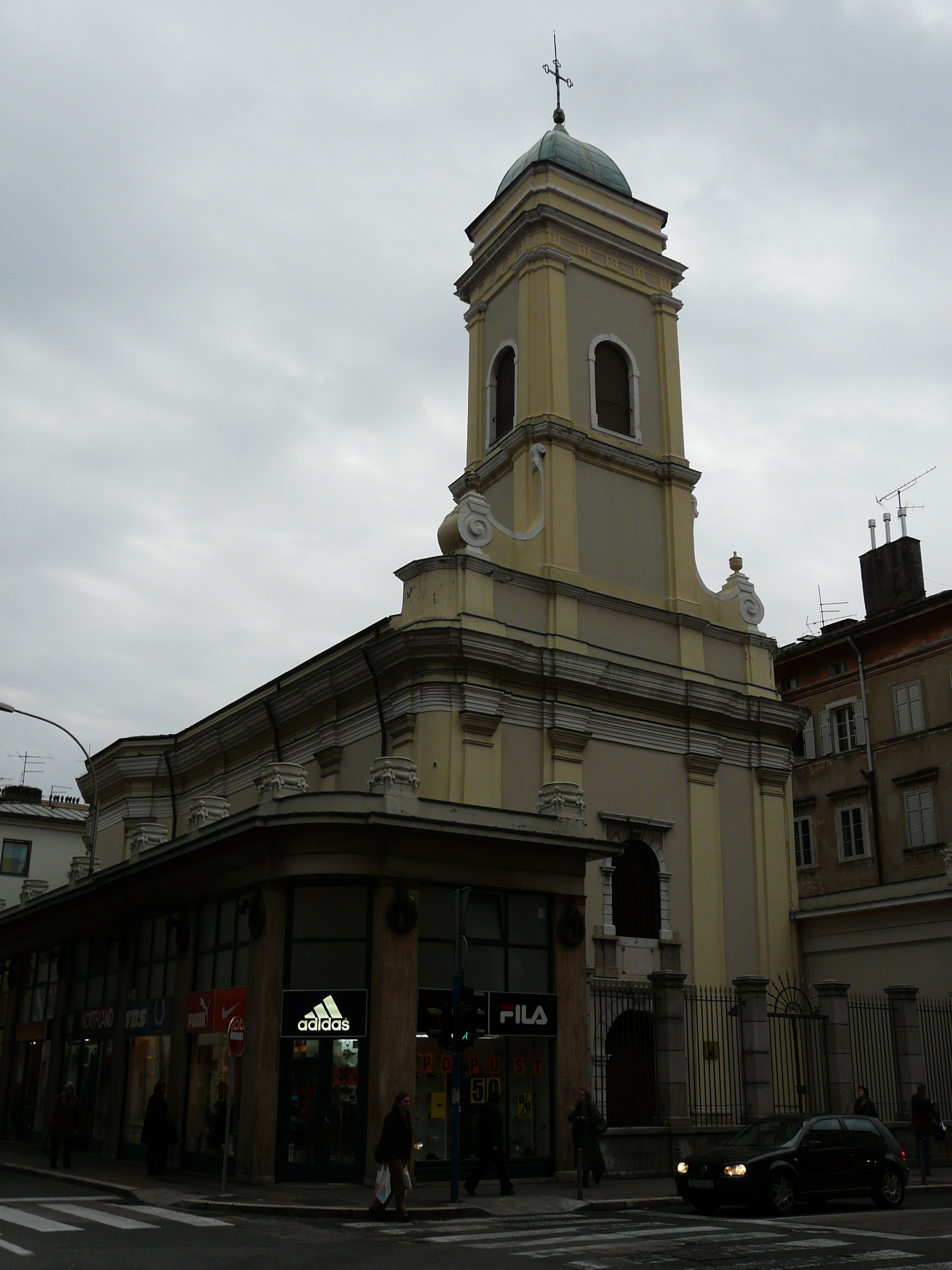
Church of Saint Nicholas, Rijeka

== See also ==
- Eastern Orthodoxy in Croatia
- Eparchies and metropolitanates of the Serbian Orthodox Church
- Serbs of Croatia

== Sources ==
- Ćirković, Sima (2004). The Serbs. Malden: Blackwell Publishing. ISBN 9781405142915.
- Mileusnić, Slobodan (1997). Spiritual Genocide: A survey of destroyed, damaged and desecrated churches, monasteries and other church buildings during the war 1991-1995 (1997). Belgrade: Museum of the Serbian Orthodox Church.
- Miller, Nicholas J. (1997). Between Nation and State: Serbian Politics in Croatia Before the First World War. Pittsburgh: University of Pittsburgh Press. ISBN 9780822939894.
- Вуковић, Сава (1996). Српски јерарси од деветог до двадесетог века (Serbian Hierarchs from the 9th to the 20th Century). Евро, Унирекс, Каленић.
