= Madžari =

Madžari may refer to:

- Madžari, Croatia, a village in the city of Sisak
- Madžari, Montenegro, a village in the municipality of Pljevlja
- Madžari, North Macedonia, a village in the municipality of Gazi Baba, city of Skopje
