= Teodor Komogovinski =

18th-century Serbian cleric and saint

Saint and Holy Martyr Theodore of Komogovina
- Born: Teodor Sladić; Donji Kukuruzari (modern Croatia)
- Died: 1788 near Moštanica monastery (modern Bosnia and Herzegovina)
- Cause of death: Burned alive by Ottomans
- Venerated in: Eastern Orthodox Churches (including the Serbian Orthodox Church); True Orthodox Church
- Canonized: 20 May 1966 (by Holy Assembly of Bishops of the Serbian Orthodox Church)
- Major shrine: St. Nicholas Church in Karlovac (formerly), then Kostajnica, with transfers to Komogovina for veneration.
- Feast: Theodore's Saturday (first Saturday of Great Lent)
- Attributes: Monk's habit, miraculously preserved right hand

Saint and Holy Martyr Theodore of Komogovina (Serbian: свети мученик Теодор (Сладић) комоговински, Teodor Komogovinski; 18th century) is a Serbian Orthodox saint (holy martyr), who served as a monk in the monasteries of Komogovina and Moštanica. When the Ottomans burned Moštanica, they killed many monks, including Teodor whom they burnt alive in 1788 after he refused to renounce his Christian faith, as well as many Serbs from surrounding villages. He is remembered on Theodore's Saturday (on the first Saturday of Great Lent).

== Life ==
Teodor Sladić (Теодор Сладић) was born in a village in Kukuruzari (modern Croatia) into a humble Serb family named Sladić. As a young man, he accompanied a monk from the Serbian Orthodox Komogovina monastery (which is near his birthplace in Kukuruzari) to Moštanica monastery near Kozarska Dubica (modern Bosnia and Herzegovina). He undertook an austere life both at Komogovina and Moštanica. When the Ottomans burned Moštanica, they killed many monks, as well as many local Serbs from the surrounding villages.

Ascetic Theodor was ordered to give up his belief in Jesus Christ, but he refused. The Turks burned him alive in 1788 near Moštanica monastery. His body burned, but his right hand has been supposedly exempted both from the fire and degradation. This was understood to be the first sign of the holiness of this martyr.

== Holy relic ==
The saved hand was moved to Komogovina monastery, where it was by the beginning of World War II. During the war, it was moved many times, and by the end of World War II it was found at St. Nicholas Church in Karlovac, where it remained until 1955 when it was returned to Kostajnica for safety reasons. During holidays and prayer days, the holy hand was carried over to Komogovina so that faithful people could bow to the martyr.

== Legacy and commemoration ==
The Holy Assembly of Bishops of the Serbian Orthodox Church on 20 May 1966 under AS number 28, record 44 took a decision: "Insert into the list of all Serbs holy martyrs for faith and St. Theodor (Sladić) martyr from Komogovina, therewith to be mentioned on the day of Theodor's Saturday".

He is remembered on Theodore's Saturday (Тодорова субота), which falls on the first Saturday of Great Lent.

== See also ==
- List of Serbian Orthodox monasteries
- List of Serbian saints
