= Battle of the San river (1914) =

Russian operation on WWI's Eastern Front

- Part of the Eastern Front during World War I
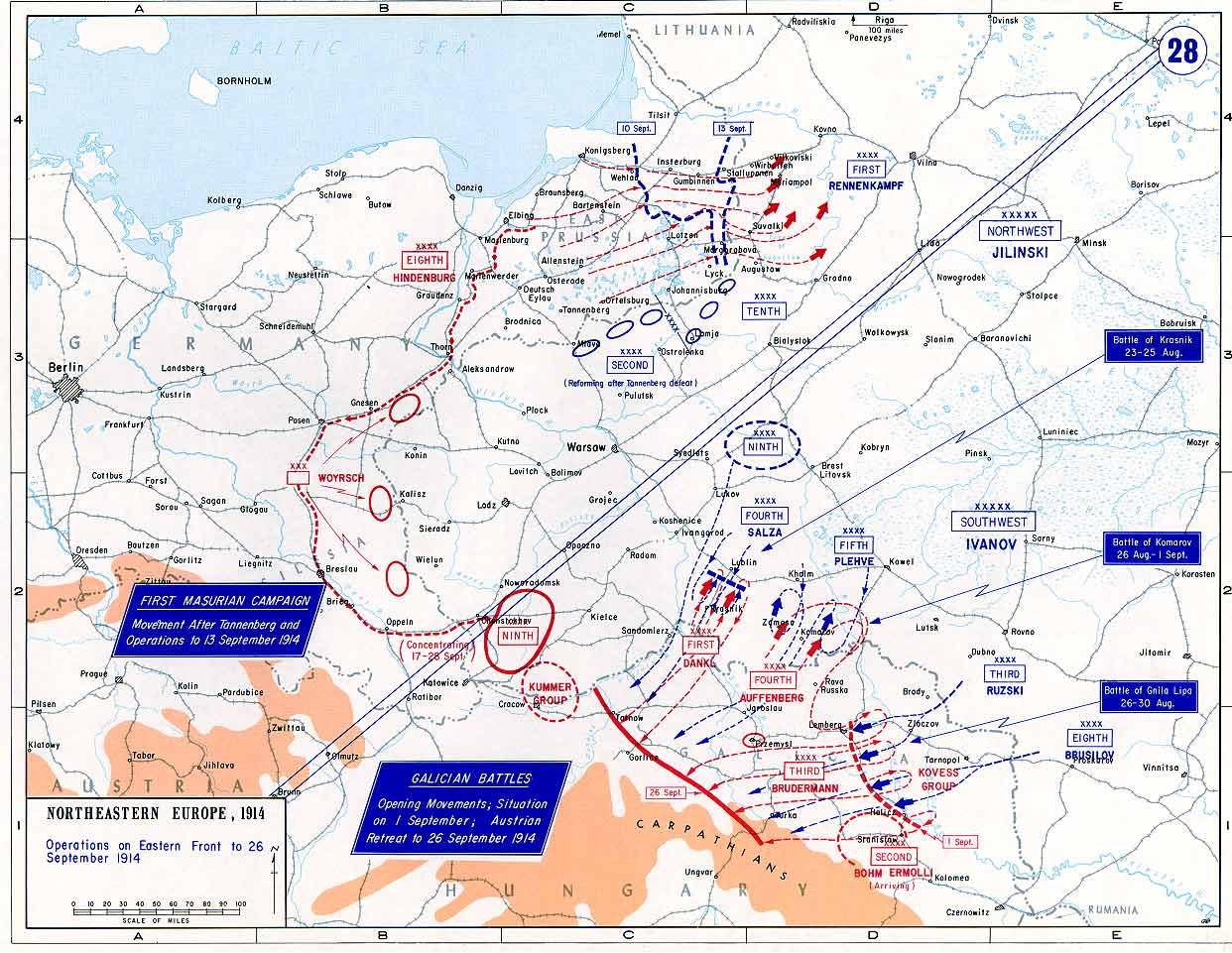
- Eastern Front, September 1914.
Date	22 September – 23 October [O.S. 5 October – 4 November] 1914
Location	Galicia, Austria-Hungary (Modern day Ukraine)
Result	Russian victory: The Siege of Przemysl is started
Territorial changes	Austria-Hungarian retreat to Krakow

Belligerents
Austria-Hungary; German Empire	Russian Empire

Commanders and leaders
(Austria-Hungary) Viktor Dankl von Krasnik (Austria-Hungary) Svetozar Boroević (Austria-Hungary) Joseph Ferdinand (Austria-Hungary) Eduard von Böhm-Ermolli	Alexei Brusilov (Note: Group and 8th Army Commander); Radko Dimitriev; Dmitry Shcherbachev

Units involved
(Austria-Hungary) 1st Army (Austria-Hungary) 3rd Army (Austria-Hungary) 4th Army (Austria-Hungary) 2rd Army	3rd Army; 8th Army; 11th Army (Note: Limited participation, mostly passive actions against the fortress of Przemysl)

Strength
582,466 (Note: Including Przemysl Garrison); 1,076 machine guns, 3,058 guns	264,426 (Note: Including “Blockade Army”); 679 machine guns, 1,139 guns

Casualties and losses
240,000: 110,900 dead and captured	126,000: 51,060 killed and captured

Battle of the San river, also known as the Second Battle of Galicia (Russian: Вторая Галицкая Битва; German: Die zweite Schlacht von Galizien) was a Russian defensive operation in Galicia in the autumn of 1914. It ended with a Russian victory. The battle was fought in parallel with the offensive in Poland and East Prussia. (Note: Battle of the Vistula River, Second Russian invasion of East Prussia (1914) (Battle of Augustów (1914)))

== Background ==
At the beginning of the war, the successful Russian invasion of Galicia ended in a disaster for Austria, more than half of Austrian manpower on the Eastern Front was lost. The Russians occupied a huge amount of territory, but were defeated in East Prussia. Due to the threat in Warsaw, the Russians sent two armies into central Poland. Only two armies remained against the Austrians and one siege army consisting of 60,000 troops.

== Battle ==
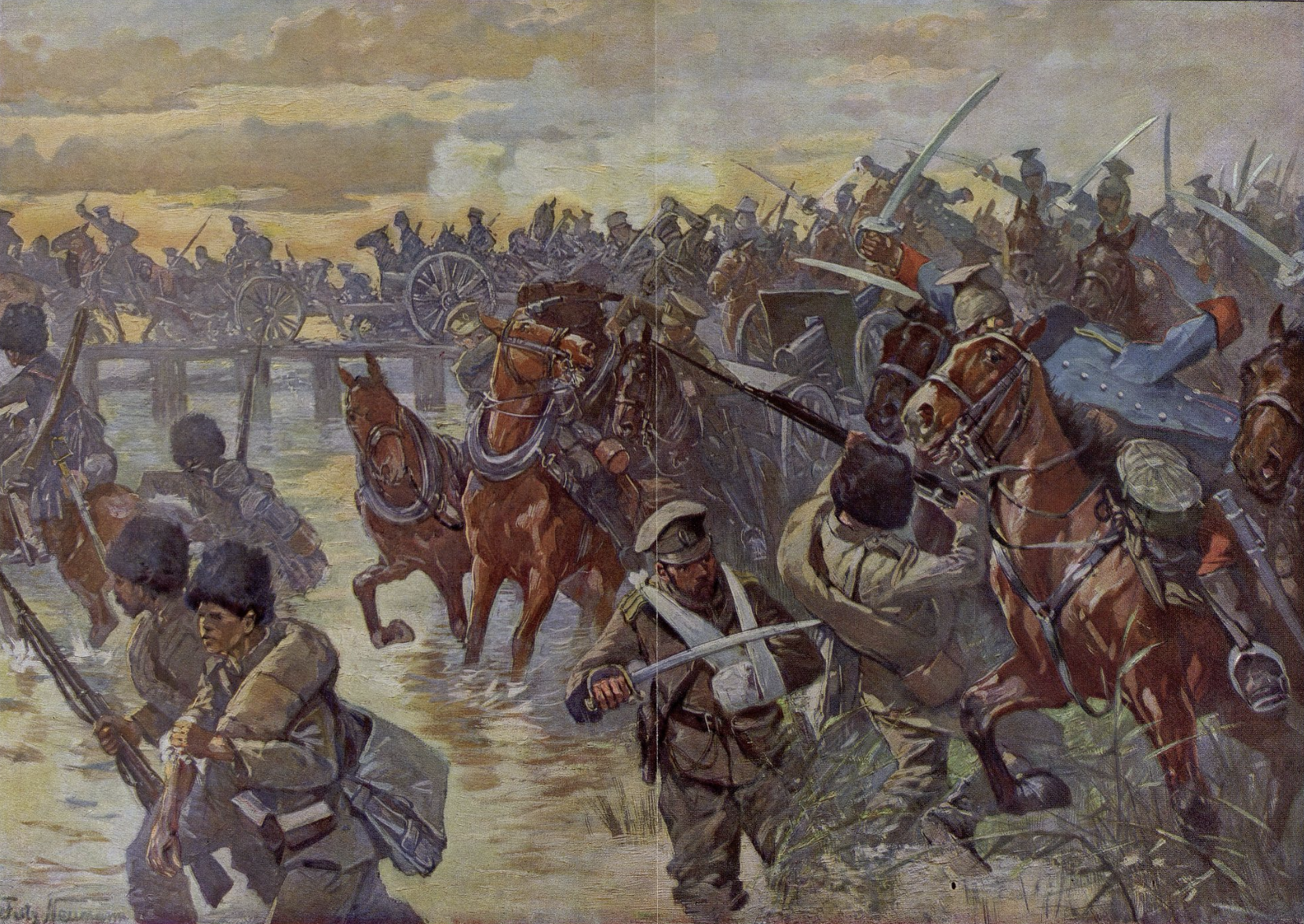
From the fighting in the San area near Jaroslaw, October 1914 (illustration by F. Neumann)

The battle began, as expected, with the advance of the Central Powers. However, the Russians dug in hard on this front and the fighting immediately took on a positional character. On October 13, the Austrians launched a general offensive on Brusilov's positions, but were repulsed everywhere, the 4th Infantry Brigade was even able to launch a counteroffensive and capture 500 prisoners of the central powers. At the front with the 3rd Army, everything was even worse, the Austrian command tried to build bridges over the san, but as soon as this was done, the Russians defeated them with the help of artillery, an attempt to force the river in other places proved unsuccessful.

Seeing these failures against the 3rd Army, the Austrians chose a defense strategy, which affected the future events of the battle. However, the first attempt to push the Austrians back from San was unsuccessful. The Russians crossed the river, repulsed a series of attacks, but due to lack of artillery they could not continue to expand the bridgehead. At the same time, the 11th Corps managed to capture part of the trenches of the central powers and a few prisoners, after which the Austrians did not dare to attack the Russians until December. Nevertheless, the superiority in artillery and manpower among the Austrians affected, in mid-October the Russian militia division was knocked out of the trenches and they broke through to the rear of the Russian troops, Brusilov's skillful actions and cavalry maneuvers were able to localize the breakthrough.

The Austrians advanced slowly, but when the Russians won a complete victory in Poland, the flanks of the 3rd Army gained a foothold and reserves began to converge on the Galician group. After that, the 3rd Army launched offensives and forced the Austro-Hungarians to retreat to Krakow, taking Przemysl under siege. At the front with the 8th Army, the Austrians tried to retreat more easily, but Brusilov saw this and overtook their rearguard, taking several thousand prisoners.

== Aftermath ==
The battle ended with the victory of the Russians. The Austrians suffered very heavy losses that could not be replenished until the winter of 1915. The number of losses in such a short period of time was the largest for the Austrians in 1914, with the participants on both sides dubbed the battle "Hell on San".
