= Ogulinec =

- Village
- Location within Croatia
- Coordinates: 45.62°N 16.13°E
- Country: Croatia
- Region: Central Croatia
- County: Zagreb County
- City: Velika Gorica

Area
  - Total: 3.9 km^{2} (1.5 sq mi)

Population (2021)
  - Total: 313
  - Density: 80/km^{2} (210/sq mi)
- Time zone: UTC+1 (CET)
  - Summer (DST): UTC+2 (CEST)

Ogulinec is a village in Croatia. It is connected by the D30 highway.
