= Atanasije Ljubojević =

Serbian Metropolitan

- Metropolitanate of Dabar and Bosnia
- Church: Serbian Orthodox Church
- Metropolis: Dabar and Bosnia
- Installed: 1681
- Term ended: 1712
- Predecessor: Hristofor Pivljanin

Personal details
- Born: 1635 Sarajevo, Ottoman Empire
- Died: 1712 (aged 76–77) Komogovina, Habsburg monarchy
- Denomination: Eastern Orthodox

Atanasije Ljubojević or Ljubović (c. 1635–1712) was the Serbian Orthodox Metropolitan of Dabar and Bosnia from 1681, and then the bishop of the Orthodox Serbs in Venetian Dalmatia and the Habsburg areas in Military Frontier. He is recorded in history as the only archbishop from the time of the renewed Serbian Patriarchate (1557–1766) who performed service under Ottoman, Venetian and Habsburg rule combined.

== Life ==
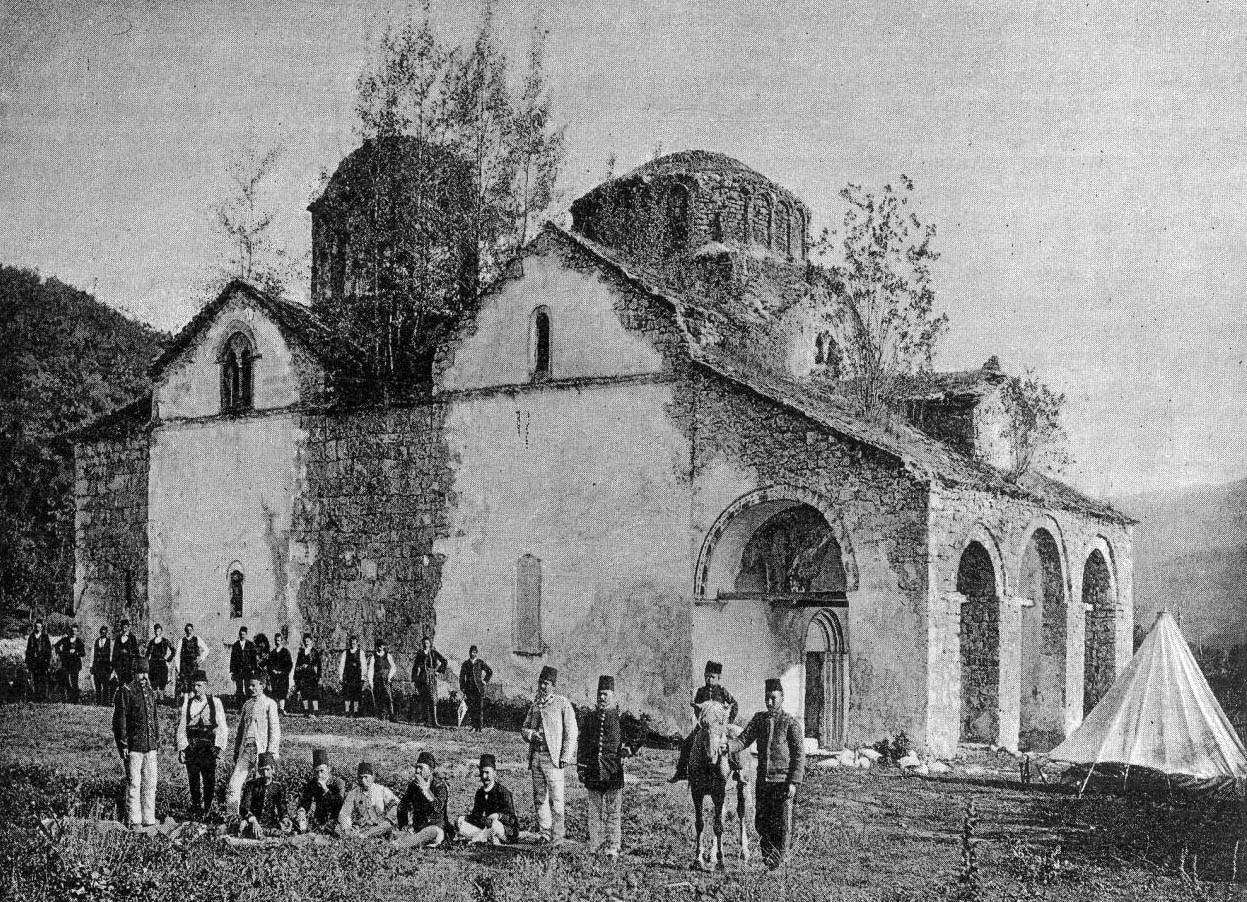
Banja Monastery, his seat while "metropolitan of Dabar-Bosna".

Ljubojević was born in Sarajevo. After the death of the Metropolitan of Dabar and Bosnia, Hristofor Pivljanin (1681), the Serbian Patriarch Arsenije III Čarnojević appointed Atanasije the new Metropolitan of Dabar-Bosna, based at the Banja Monastery by the Lim river. Ottoman sultan Mehmed IV confirmed his appointment in a berat (decree) in 1682. During the first years of service, he managed the entire area of the Metropolitanate of Dabar and Bosnia, which stretched from lower Polimlje, through the central Bosnian areas, to Cetina, Bukovica, Lika, Krbava, Pounje and Zrinopolje in the far west (in today's Croatia). He regularly visited the parish in Sarajevo. He sent letters and epistles to the eparchies in which he stressed the need to keep the Orthodox faith awake. Ottoman violence against Orthodox Christians and church institutions in Polimlje during the Vienna War (1683–1699) led to the flight of him and his relatives, and monks of the Dabar monasteries, to the western areas of the metropolitanate, which fell under Venetian and Habsburg rule during the war. He remained loyal to Patriarch Arsenije III since he received transcripts of the first privileges, given to the Serb people in 1690 and 1691 by Emperor Leopold I. In the first years since leaving Ottoman Bosnia, he focused on the territory of Venetian Dalmatia.

Upon his arrival in Dalmatia, he arranged the metropolitan residence at the church of St. Nicholas in the Atlagić Tower. He appeared before the Venetian authorities in Dalmatia, calling for Serb privileges in 1692. He enjoyed the support of the Orthodox clergy and national leaders, who in 1693, led by Morlach serdar Zaviša Janković, took up the task of making the metropolitan's position before the Venetian authorities official. Since they did not want to allow the Venetian state government to formalize the metropolitan's position, Roman Catholic bishops and other opponents of the Serbian hierarchy and Orthodox faith used the metropolitan's occasional visits to the neighbouring Habsburg area of Lika and Krbava to accuse him of participating in the emigration. At the instigation of the then Nuncio in Venice and his associates in Dalmatia, the Venetian authorities took a hostile attitude towards the metropolitan, who then had to move to the neighbouring Habsburg areas. After moving to the area of Lika and Krbava, he started (1695) arranging a new archbishop's residence in the Lika village of Metka. He also visited Orthodox Serbs in the area of Zrinopolje, where the Komogovina monastery was founded. On the basis of Serb privileges and earlier affiliation of that area to the Kingdom of Slavonia, he received from ban Adam Baćanji (1696) confirmation of religious eldership over the Orthodox people and clergy in the area of new regions between the rivers Kupa and Una. He also met with the Serbian patriarch Arsenije (1698), to whom he remained permanently attached.

During the war and post-war years, he managed to preserve the diocesan order in the areas of Zrinopolje, Lika and Krbava, which led Serbian Patriarch Arsenije III Čarnojević to extend the diocesan jurisdiction of Bishop Atanasij to the pre-war area of the Karlovac General. This completed the creation of a single diocese in the area of Upper Krajina. The new diocese included the Karlovac Generalate with Lika and Krbava and the new region between Kupa and Una, with three main spiritual centers in the monasteries of Komogovina, Gomirje and Metka.

Opponents of the Serbian hierarchy and the Orthodox faith tried to thwart the activities of this Serbian archbishop in the Habsburg areas on several occasions during the war and post-war years, but they did not succeed, since Bishop Atanasije enjoyed a great reputation with the Orthodox clergy and people. After the death of Patriarch Arsenije III (1706), the bishop continued to advocate for the preservation of the church and national unity of all Orthodox Serbs in the Habsburg lands. Despite the initial opposition of the state authorities, Bishop Atanasije, together with other representatives of Orthodox Serbs from Gornja Krajina, managed to join the work of the Krušedol Council at Krušedol Monastery (1708), which defended the church and national unity of Orthodox Serbs in the Habsburg lands.

Although after the assembly the state authorities were asked to confirm the bishop's authority in the entire area of Gornja Krajina, Emperor Joseph I recognized his jurisdiction only in the areas of Zrinopolje, Lika and Krbava. This called into question the future survival of a single diocese. After the bishop's death (1712), at the church people's assembly held in 1713 in Sremski Karlovci, a decision was made to create a special diocese in the area of Gornja Krajina in addition to the diocese that included Zrinopolje, Lika and Krbava, which included the pre-war area. Karlovac General. Dionisije Ugarković was then elected as the bishop's successor in the first, Kostajnica diocese, and Danilo Ljubotina was elected as the successor in the second, Gornji Karlovac diocese.

It is assumed that the bishop died in the monastery of Komogovina, where he was probably buried. Due to disagreement over his legacy, the Serbian patriarch Mojsije Rajović posthumously excommunicated him, but this decision was revoked and annulled by the patriarch himself shortly after (1714) since all disputed issues had been resolved in the meantime thanks to Krušedol Metropolitan Vikentije Popović-Hadžilavić.

Metropolitan Atanasije Ljubojević was one of the most deserving Serbian archbishops in the early modern period, having had a successful ministry in various areas under Turkish, Venetian and Habsburg rule, a testimony to the unity of Orthodox Serbs in the western side of the renewed Serbian Patriarchate (1557–1766).

Eastern Orthodox Church titles
Preceded by First	Orthodox administrator of Zrinopolje, Lika and Krbava (Habsburg); 1706–1712	Succeeded by ?
Preceded by Hristofor Pivljanin	Metropolitan of Dabar-Bosna; 1681–1712	Succeeded by Visarion

== Sources ==
- Vuković, Sava (1996). Српски јерарси од деветог до двадесетог века. Евро, Унирекс, Каленић.
- Grbić, Manojlo (1891). Карловачко владичанство. Vol. 1. Каrlovac, Croatia.
- Grbić, Manojlo (1893). Карловачко владичанство. Vol. 3. Karlovac, Croatia.
