= Umetić =

Umetići
- Village
- Location within Croatia
- Coordinates: 45°18′N 16°26′E
- Country: Croatia
- Region: Continental Croatia (Banovina)
- County: Sisak-Moslavina
- Municipality: Donji Kukuruzari

Area
  - Total: 5.3 km^{2} (2.0 sq mi)

Population (2021)
  - Total: 68
  - Density: 13/km^{2} (33/sq mi)
- Time zone: UTC+1 (CET)
  - Summer (DST): UTC+2 (CEST)

Umetići is a village in the Donji Kukuruzari municipality in central Croatia. It is connected by the D30 highway.

== Geography ==
Umetić is located in Banovina.

== History ==
The region was held by Krajina Serbs during the Croatian War of Independence.

== Demographics ==
- 2011: 73 inhabitants.
- 1991: 136 inhabitants.

== Notable people ==
- Svetozar Boroević
