= City Radio (Croatia) =

Local radio station in Croatia

Lekenik; Croatia
- Frequency: 91.1, 88.6 MHz

Programming
- Language: Croatian
- Format: Varied

Ownership
- Owner: e-Radio d.o.o.

History
- First air date: June 21, 2000
- Former names: RTL Radio (2000–2010)

Links
- Webcast: Slušaj uživo
- Website: www.cityportal.hr

City Radio is a local radio station in central Croatia, broadcasting to Velika Gorica, Lekenik and Kravarsko. Their name was RTL Radio between 2000 and December 2010. Their FM frequencies are 91.1 and 88.6 MHz.

== Location ==
The station is located in Lekenik beside the main road Zagreb - Sisak/Petrinja. From Sisak is 20 km away and from Zagreb 30 km.

== Independence ==
RTL Radio (Croatia) was founded, registered and operated outside the RTL Group. Level of independence from the state, regional, and local self-government is high. RTL Radio is financed solely by his own resources and funds raised its marketing.

== Flashback ==
RTL-Radio started its work 21 June 2000. in modest conditions and with three Reporters. In 2001 the team joining more Reporters. The program began to broadcast 24 hours a day in the year 2003. In the year 2007 changes the ownership structure of companies and location.

== Awards ==
In 2005 RTL Radio was awarded best local radio station at the Croatian radio festival.

== See also ==
- List of radio stations in Croatia
