= Bijelnik =

Coordinates: 45°21′N 16°23′E

- Village
- Interactive map of Bijelnik
- Country: Croatia
- Region: Continental Croatia (Banovina)
- County: Sisak-Moslavina
- Municipality: Petrinja

Area
  - Total: 3.2 km^{2} (1.2 sq mi)

Population (2021)
  - Total: 34
  - Density: 11/km^{2} (28/sq mi)
- Time zone: UTC+1 (CET)
  - Summer (DST): UTC+2 (CEST)

Bijelnik is a village in Croatia. It is connected by the D30 highway.
