= Panjani =

- Village
- Location within Croatia
- Coordinates: 45°14′39″N 16°31′17″E
- Country: Croatia
- Region: Continental Croatia (Banovina)
- County: Sisak-Moslavina
- Municipality: Hrvatska Kostajnica

Area
  - Total: 1.4 km^{2} (0.54 sq mi)

Population (2021)
  - Total: 90
  - Density: 64/km^{2} (170/sq mi)
- Time zone: UTC+1 (CET)
  - Summer (DST): UTC+2 (CEST)

Panjani is a village in Croatia. It is connected by the D30 highway.
