= Vukovina =

Coordinates: 45°41′N 16°07′E

- Village
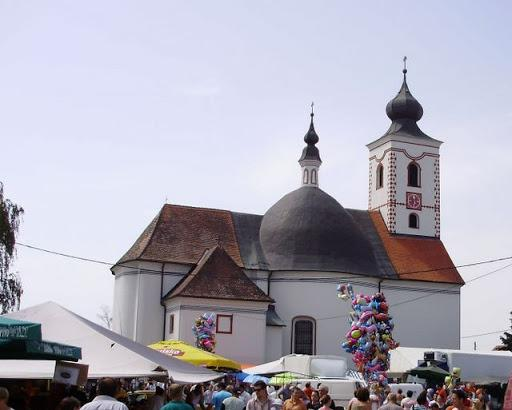
- Interactive map of Vukovina
- Country: Croatia
- Region: Central Croatia
- County: Zagreb County
- City: Velika Gorica

Area
  - Total: 6.0 km^{2} (2.3 sq mi)

Population (2021)
  - Total: 884
  - Density: 150/km^{2} (380/sq mi)
- Time zone: UTC+1 (CET)
  - Summer (DST): UTC+2 (CEST)

Vukovina is a village in Croatia. It is connected by the D30 highway.
