= Komogovina Monastery =

Serbian Orthodox monastery near Petrinja, Croatia

- Interactive map of Komogovina Monastery

Monastery information
- Other name: Monastery of the Transfiguration of the Lord
- Denomination: Eastern Orthodox
- Established: 1693
- Diocese: Eparchy of Gornji Karlovac

Site
- Location: Komogovina
- Country: Croatia
- Coordinates: 45.302°N 16.376°E

The Komogovina Monastery was a Serbian Orthodox monastery in Komogovina, Croatia that was in operation between 1693 and 1777 and since then functioned as a parish church. It was destroyed in World War II.

It was established by monks from Bosanska Krajina in the 17th century in 1693. Their earlier monastery below the Kozara Mountain was destroyed in war against the Ottoman Empire. Its first monks were Jovo Svilokos and Silvestar Prodanović while monk Atanasije Ljubojević managed to attain religious diploma recognizing monastery's spiritual guidance over the Orthodox Vlachs and Serbs in between the Kupa and Una rivers. Between 1715 and 1738 the monastery was the seat of the first three bishops of the historical Eparchy of Kostajnica, belonging to the Ugarković, Dimitrijević and Ljubibratić families. Bishop Andrijević oversaw the construction of present day church in the 1741-1749 period.

Due to its small size the monastery was closed down in 1777 and its possessions were transferred to the Gomirje Monastery and to Serbian Orthodox monasteries in the region of Banat where the majority of monks moved as well. The church was downgraded to a parish church. Local population opposed this decision and issued a People's Appeal against the abolition of monastery which was signed by two protopreslators, two governors, thirteen priests, and 117 delegates from 28 settlements.

The complex was heavily devastated by the Italian forces during World War II. Certain objects were saved earlier by the Museum of Arts and Crafts in Zagreb. Icons produced in the Komogovina Monastery are in specialized literature known as the Komogovina School. One of the relics saved in 1942 was the hand of the saint Teodor Tiron which survived burning by the Ottomans. After the end of World War II it remained in Zagreb where it was kept in silver box but it disappeared during the Croatian War of Independence.
