= Babina Rijeka =

Settlement in Sisak-Moslavina County, Croatia

- settlement
- Interactive map of Babina Rijeka
- Location within Croatia
- Coordinates: 45°15′25″N 16°26′53″E
- Country: Croatia
- County: Sisak-Moslavina
- Municipality: Donji Kukuruzari

Area
  - Total: 11.4 km^{2} (4.4 sq mi)

Population (2021)
  - Total: 90
  - Density: 7.9/km^{2} (20/sq mi)
- Time zone: UTC+1 (CET)
  - Summer (DST): UTC+2 (CEST)
- Postal code: 44430 Hrvatska Kostajnica
- Area code: +385 (0)44

Babina Rijeka is a settlement in the Municipality of Donji Kukuruzari in Croatia. In 2021, its population was 90.

== Demographics ==
Babina Rijeka: Population trends 1857–2021
v

population	222	232	285	332	384	457	419	456	351	369	360	343	289	250	188	127	90
	1857	1869	1880	1890	1900	1910	1921	1931	1948	1953	1961	1971	1981	1991	2001	2011	2021

Sources: Croatian Bureau of Statistics publications
