= Palanjek Pokupski =

- Village
- Location of Palanjek Pokupski in Croatia
- Coordinates: 45.5°N 16.059°E
- Country: Croatia
- Region: Turopolje
- County: Sisak-Moslavina
- Municipality: Lekenik

Area
  - Total: 2.0 sq mi (5.2 km^{2})
- Elevation: 528 ft (161 m)

Population (2021)
  - Total: 7
  - Density: 3.5/sq mi (1.3/km^{2})
- Time zone: UTC+1 (CET)
  - Summer (DST): UTC+2 (CEST)
- Postal code: 44 271

Palanjek Pokupski is a village in municipality of Lekenik in central Croatia.

== History ==
The ancient Roman archaeological site called Gradina is located south of the village with ceramic artifacts, bricks, and residues of sand and clay plaster present at the site.

=== World War II persecutions of local Serb population ===
On the night of 11 to 12 May 1941, 5 local Serbs were seized and murdered after the killing of a Nazi soldier in the village of Pešćenica.
