= Knezovljani =

Coordinates: 45°18′N 16°25′E

Knezovljani Кнезовљани (Serbian)
- Village
- Interactive map of Knezovljani
- Country: Croatia
- Region: Continental Croatia (Banovina)
- County: Sisak-Moslavina
- Municipality: Donji Kukuruzari

Area
  - Total: 1.9 sq mi (5.0 km^{2})

Population (2021)
  - Total: 63
  - Density: 33/sq mi (13/km^{2})
- Time zone: UTC+1 (CET)
  - Summer (DST): UTC+2 (CEST)

Knezovljani is a village in the Donji Kukuruzari municipality of central Croatia. It is connected by the D30 highway. According to the 2011 census, there was a total of 81 inhabitants.

== History ==
The village was part of the Republic of Serbian Krajina during the Croatian War (1991–95).

== Demographic history ==
According to the 1991 census, there was a total of 177 inhabitants, out of whom Serbs were majority 171 (96.61%), with Croats 2 (1.12%), and others 4 (2.25%).
