= Saint Nicholas Cathedral, Karlovac =

Serbian Orthodox cathedral in Karlovac, Croatia

Coordinates: 45°29′35″N 15°33′24″E

Saint Nicholas Cathedral
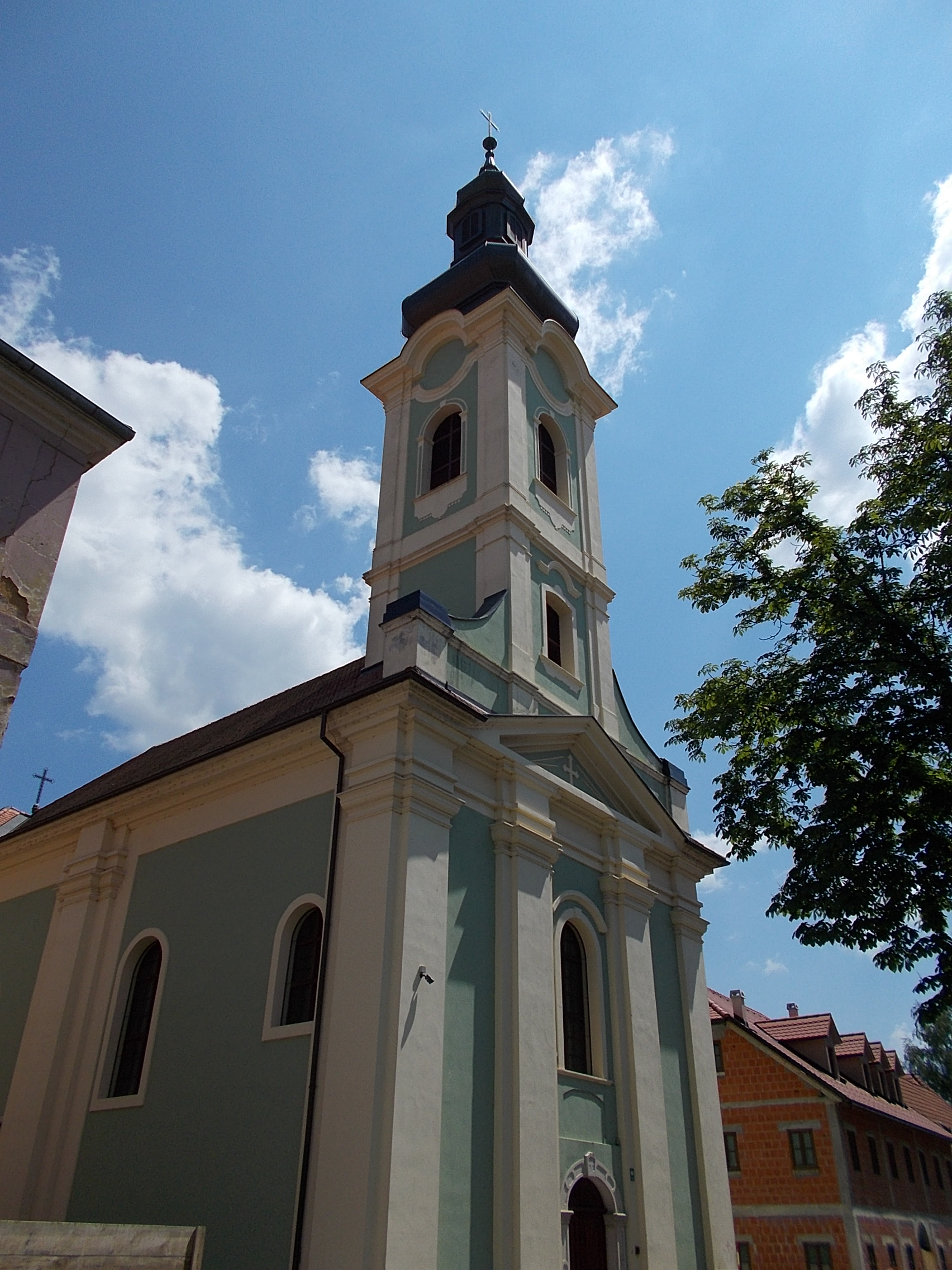
- Saint Nicholas Cathedral, pictured in 2013
- Saint Nicholas Cathedral
- Location: Karlovac
- Country: Croatia
- Denomination: Serbian Orthodox

History
- Dedication: Saint Nicholas

Architecture
- Style: Baroque
- Years built: 1803

Administration
- Archdiocese: Eparchy of Upper Karlovac

The Saint Nicholas Cathedral (Serbian: Саборна црква Светог Николе), is an Eastern Orthodox church located in Karlovac, Croatia. It is under jurisdiction of the Eparchy of Gornji Karlovac of the Serbian Orthodox Church and serves as its cathedral church.

The original church (destroyed in 1993) built in 1787, and was dedicated to Saint Nicholas. In 2007, the church was completely renovated.

== History ==
The local Serbian community collected money for today's church in 1781 and a request for permission to build it sent to authorities in 1784. Permission for construction was granted and work started in 1785. The church was completed in 1787 and worship began in 1803.

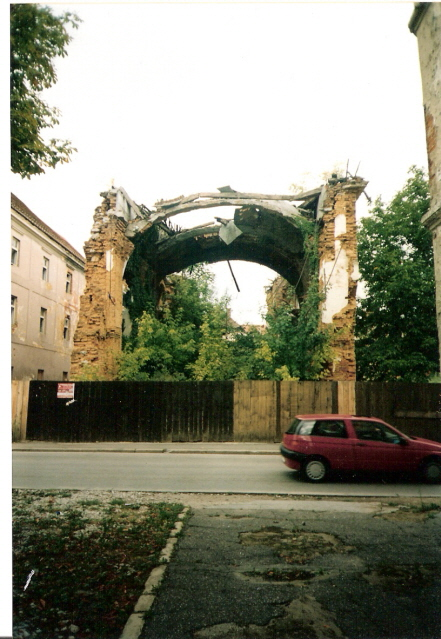
Remnants of destroyed church, 2005

Land was purchased for 3,000 Forints and 12 Ducats. The construction supervisor and architect for the new church was Josip Štiler. Construction costs were 30,000 Forints which were collected by the members of the local church municipality and by Serb merchants from Karlovac and Trieste. Arsa Teodorović painted icons for the church's iconostasis and the building was sanctified by Bishop Petar Jovanović in 1803.

The church was devastated during World War II, and then again in 1991, during the Croatian War of Independence, when mines were detonated inside the church by Croatian forces. The church was repeatedly blown up and robbed until final destruction in 1993.

The church was completely renovated in 2007. In 2012, on the Serbian Orthodox Church's Christmas liturgy, Croatian President Ivo Josipović visited the church.

== See also ==
- List of Serbian Orthodox churches in Croatia
- Serbs of Croatia
