= Petrovec, Croatia =

Petrovec
- Interactive map of Petrovec
- Coordinates: 45°30′N 16°17′E
- Country: Croatia
- County: Sisak-Moslavina County
- Municipality: Lekenik

Petrovec is a village near Lekenik, Sisak-Moslavina County, central Croatia. The population is 356 (census 2021).
