= Letovanić =

Coordinates: 45°30′N 16°12′E

- Village
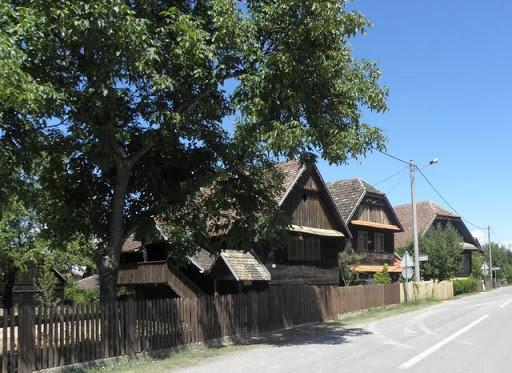
- Interactive map of Letovanić
- Country: Croatia
- County: Sisak-Moslavina
- Municipality: Lekenik

Area
  - Total: 16.2 km^{2} (6.3 sq mi)

Population (2021)
  - Total: 399
  - Density: 24.6/km^{2} (63.8/sq mi)
- Time zone: UTC+1 (CET)
  - Summer (DST): UTC+2 (CEST)

Letovanić is a village in Croatia, placed in Lekenik municipality at the river Kupa. It is connected by the D36 highway. Its origins date back to the 12th and 13th century. It's famous for the local "Letovanić hill", which has vineyards and fruit plantations. It's also a famous destination because of it being located by Kupa, which means that during the summer tourists visit it.
