= Brkiševina =

- Village
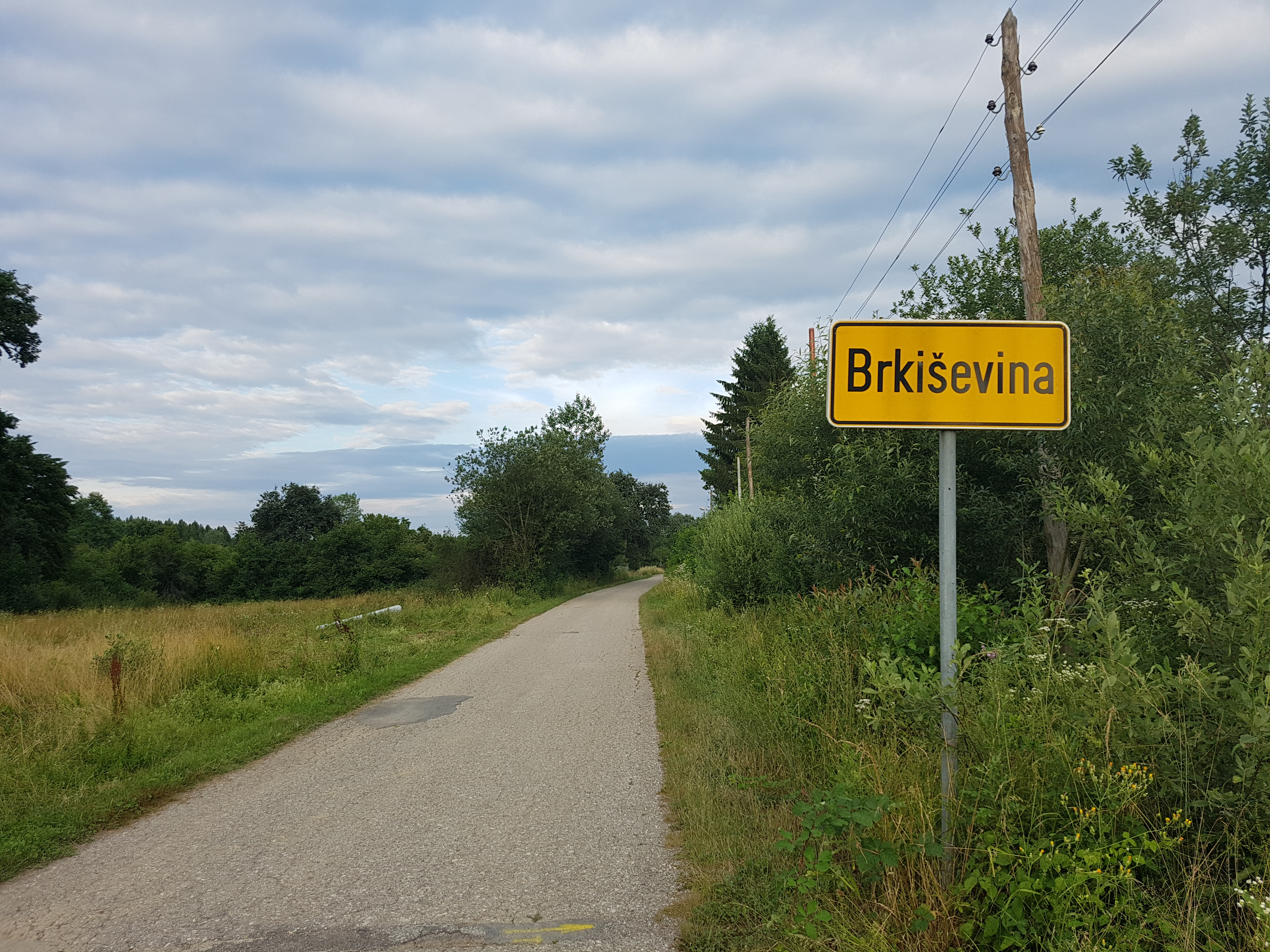
- Road sign for Brkisevina
- Interactive map of Brkiševina
- Coordinates: 45.444°N 16.093°E
- Country: Croatia
- County: Sisak-Moslavina County
- Municipality: Lekenik

Area
  - Total: 10.8 km^{2} (4.2 sq mi)
- Elevation: 124 m (407 ft)

Population (2021)
  - Total: 59
  - Density: 5.5/km^{2} (14/sq mi)
- Time zone: UTC+1 (CET)
  - Summer (DST): UTC+2 (CEST)
- Postal code: 44000 Sisak
- Area code: +385 (0)44

Brkiševina is a village in Lekenik municipality in Croatia.

== History ==
At the Slavonian Sabor of June 1600 in Krapina, it was noted that the defences of the castle were in ruins, so the 6 nobles of Šćitarjevo were ordered to provide 6 workers, and the nobles of the Plain of Zagreb were ordered to provide 34 workers, for the repair of its walls.

== Demographics ==
Village of Brkiševina: Population trends 1857–2021
v

population	392	403	387	455	502	498	536	552	503	495	443	370	276	205	121	95	59
	1857	1869	1880	1890	1900	1910	1921	1931	1948	1953	1961	1971	1981	1991	2001	2011	2021

Note:Enlarged in 1991 by the annexation of part of Šišinec. Sources: Croatian Bureau of Statistics publications
