= Svetozar Boroević =

Austro-Hungarian field marshal (1856–1920)

K.u.k. Feldmarschall Svetozar Boroević von Bojna
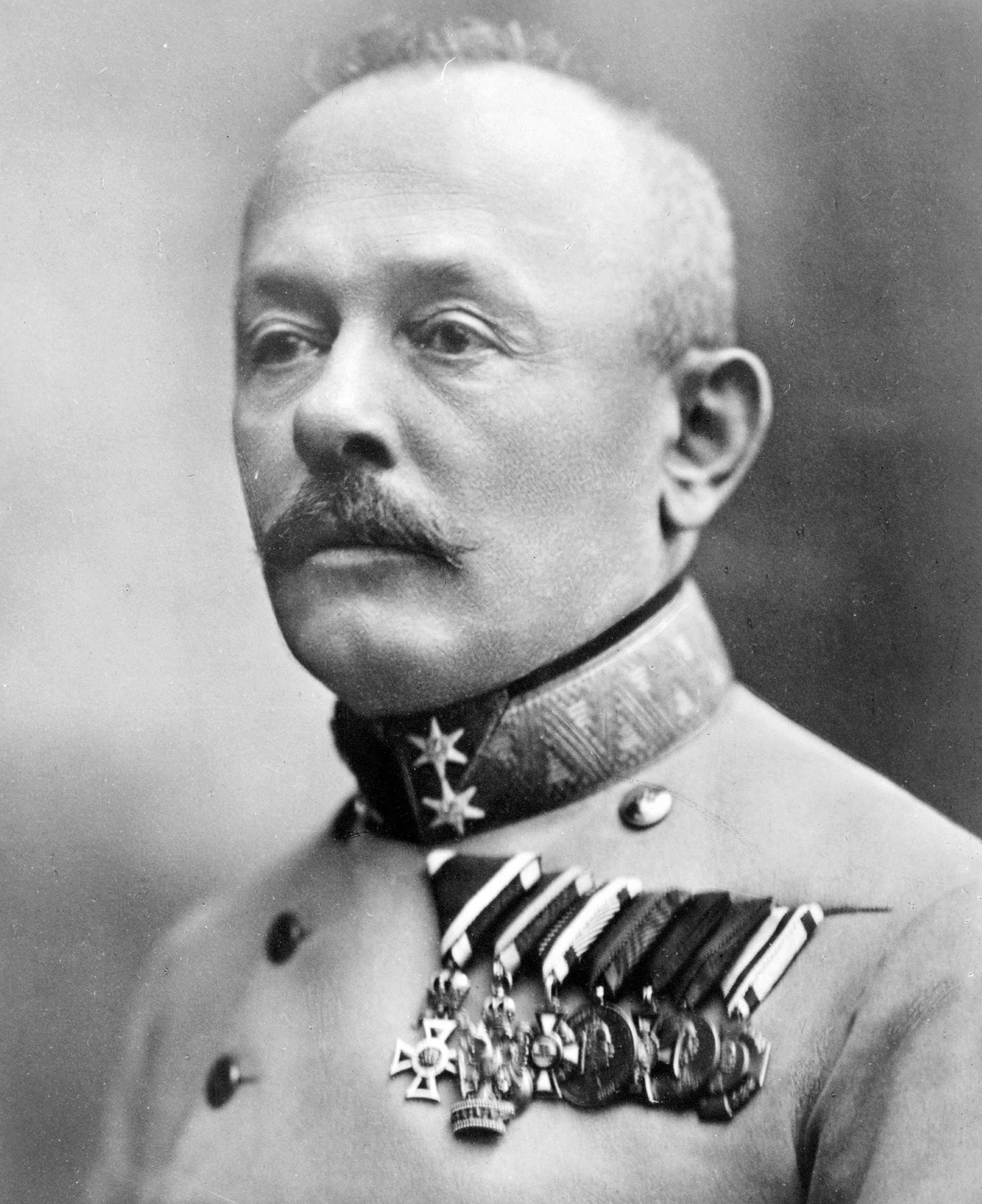
- Borojević c. 1913
- Born: 13 December 1856; Umetić, Croatian Military Frontier, Austrian Empire (now Croatia)
- Died: 23 May 1920 (aged 63); Klagenfurt, Austria
- Military career
- Allegiance: Austria-Hungary
- Branch: Austro-Hungarian Army
- Service years: 1872–1918
- Rank: Field Marshal
- Nickname: Lion of Isonzo
- Conflicts: See battles World War I: Eastern Front (1914–1915); Battle of the San river; Battle of Krakow; Battle of Limanowa; Siege of Przemyśl; Gorlice–Tarnów Offensive; Italian Campaign (1915–1918); Battles of the Isonzo (1915–1917); First Battle (1915); Second Battle (1915); Third Battle (1915); Fourth Battle (1915); Fifth Battle (1916); Sixth Battle (1916); Seventh Battle (1916); Eighth Battle (1916); Ninth Battle (1916); Tenth Battle (1917); Eleventh Battle (1917); Battle of Caporetto (1917); Second Battle of the Piave River (1918); Battle of Vittorio Veneto (1918)
- Awards: Military Merit Cross, Cross of the Order Star of Romania, Persian Order of the Sun and the Lion, Order of the Iron Crown (Austria), Knights' Cross of the Order of Leopold, Military Order of Maria Theresa

Svetozar Boroević von Bojna (or Borojević) (13 December 1856 – 23 May 1920) was an Austro-Hungarian field marshal who was described as one of the finest defensive strategists of the First World War. He commanded Austro-Hungarian forces in the Isonzo front, for which he was nicknamed the "Lion of Isonzo".

For his service during the First World War, Boroević rose to the rank of Feldmarschall before the end of the war in 1918, becoming the first and only Austro-Hungarian field marshal of South Slavic descent.

== Life ==
=== Early life ===
Boroević was born to a Serbian Orthodox family on 13 December 1856 in the village of Umetić, Croatian Military Frontier. He was baptized in the Serbian Orthodox Church, most likely in the parish church in Mečenčani, where his father served. His father Adam Boroević was a Grenzer (border guard) officer, his mother was Stana (née Kovarbašić von Zborište). His father took part in wars in Italy, Hungary and Austro-Hungarian campaign in Bosnia and Herzegovina in 1878. He was awarded the silver medal for bravery. As an old man, Boroević's father had built a Serbian Orthodox church as his endowment in Mečenčani, which was consecrated in 1877. Boroević had a brother, Nikola, a colonel who also received Austrian noble status in 1917.

Some sources state that Boroević was an ethnic Serb or of Serb origin. Other sources regard him as an ethnic Croat or of Croat origin. Boroević himself stated that he was a Croat and that Croatia was his homeland.

=== Military career ===
==== Early career ====
He joined cadet school at the age of ten. After finishing grade school he moved to Kamenica and later Graz where he studied in military academies. He attended the Liebenau cadet school in 1875. After graduating from Military School he served as a Junior Officer in the army. He advanced quickly through the ranks. He was a corporal in 1872, and later on May 1, 1875, he became a lieutenant. He would also fight battles in Bosnia in 1878. In 1889, he married Leontina von Rosner, a daughter of a late Austrian colonel, Friedrich Ritter von Rosner. The couple had one son, Friedrich Borojević von Bojna, named after his mother's father. The son died in 1918.

Boroević was awarded for his service in the capture of Sarajevo. Svetozar would eventually become a commander in the Croatian Home Guard. Before the First World War, he commanded the 42. Home Guard Infantry Division of the Croatian Home Guard. In 1903 he was formally released from the Home Guard, already having been assigned to the Imperial & Royal Army in 1898. During war, the defensive troops were part of the Armed Forces commanded by the Supreme Army Command and could be used at the front. He distinguished himself in the Austro-Hungarian occupation of Bosnia and Herzegovina in 1878. Because of his service, he was awarded Military Merit Cross. Afterwards, he was promoted to the rank of Oberleutnant in 1880. From 1881 to 1883 he studied at the military academy in Vienna. Between 1887 and 1891 he underwent additional military training and worked as an instructor after that, and he would begin his teaching at the Theresian Military Academy. He would finish teaching there in 1891. Svetozar became a major in May 1892. In May 1895, he was promoted to the rank of lieutenant colonel. He would take control over a battalion of the 17th Infantry Regiment during the month of April in 1896. In November 1897 he was promoted to Colonel. Later he was appointed to chief of staff of the Seventh Corps of the Imperial & Royal Army in June 1898, where he remained until February 1904. In 1904, he was promoted Major General and took control of the 14th Infantry Brigade. In May 1905, he was created a Hungarian nobleman (since Croatia was one of the Lands of the Holy Hungarian Crown) with the attribute von Bojna by the Emperor & King. From 1907 to 1912 he commanded to VII Landwehr Division. On May 1, 1908, the monarch made him Field Marshal Lieutenant (Feldmarschallleutnant). In September 1909 he was put in charge of the VI Corps in Kassa. He became the commander of the Sixth Corps of the I & R Army in April 1912 and on May 1, 1913, General of the Infantry.

==== World War I ====
===== Early War =====
When World War I started in 1914 he was in command of the Sixth Corps on Galicia in the Eastern Front. He would distinguish himself at these battles. On September 1, 1914, he became commander of the Third Army. He would fight at the Battle of Komarów. Later, in early October he liberated Fort Przemysl, providing a temporary relief in the Siege of Przemyśl. His troops then pulled back to hold positions around Limanowa, at the Dukla mountain pass, and elsewhere on the Carpathians, stopping the Russians from breaking out on the Danube. The Russian counter-offensive in February and March 1915 almost managed to push Boroević's Third Army back towards Hungary, but they managed to hold just enough for the German reinforcements to arrive and save the already endangered Budapest and the Pressburg bridgehead. They then proceeded to join the general Austro-Hungarian—German offensive (with the Austro-Hungarian Fourth Army under Archduke Joseph Ferdinand and the German Eleventh Army under Mackensen) that pushed back the Russians and eventually retook Przemysl.

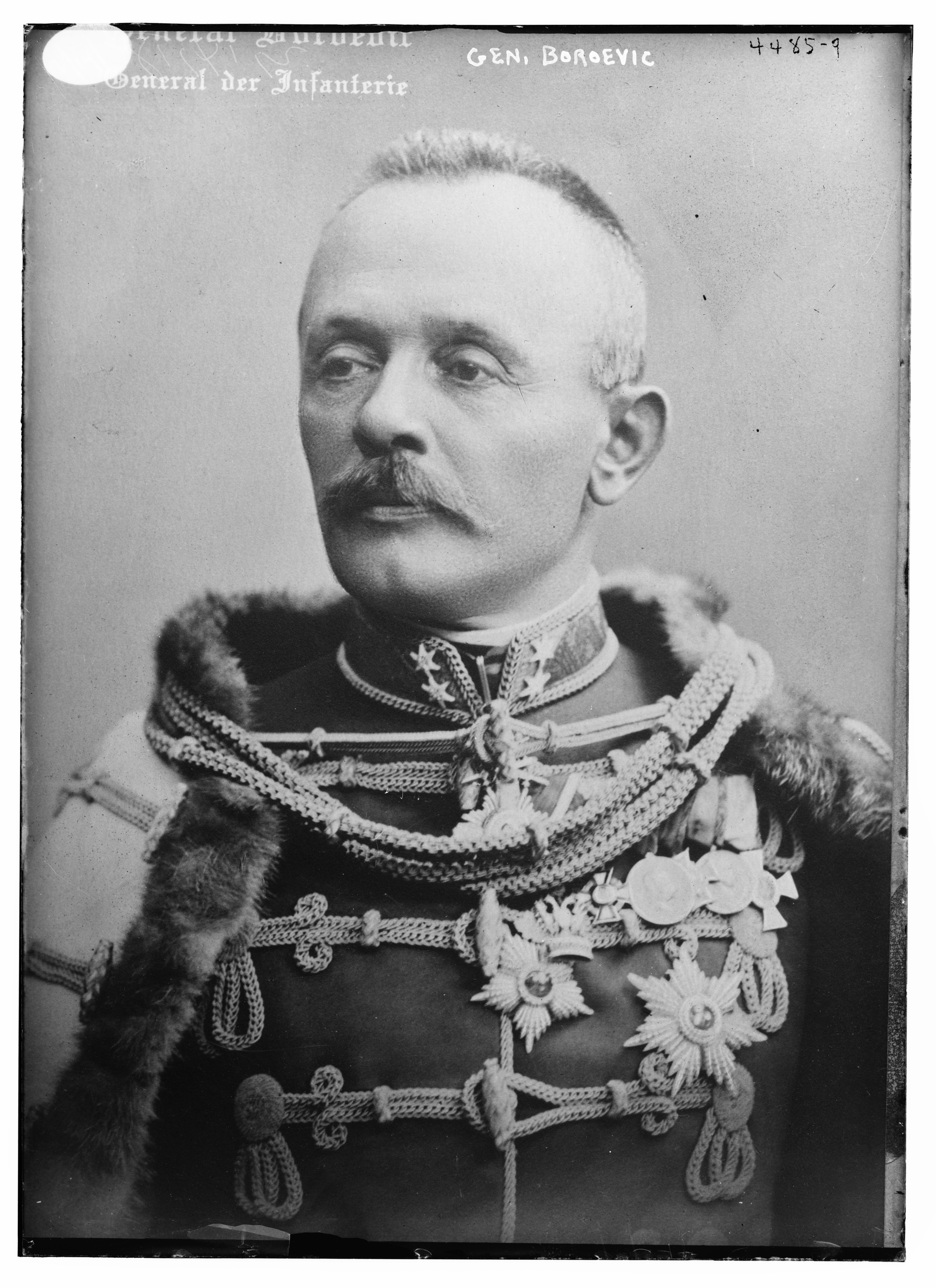
Boroević as a general of the infantry in 1915

===== Isonzo Front =====
His actions on other sections of the war appealed to Emperor Franz Joseph and on May 25, 1915, he was given command on the Isonzo front. He arrived on May 27 with part of the Third Army with him and leaving the rest to Army Group Mackensen. There Boroević became the Commander of the Fifth Army, with which he organized a defense against the Italians to break countless offensives. He finished building defenses and managing the logistics of his army by the end of May. While there, Boroević's troops contained eleven Italian attacks and he was hailed as the Knight of Isonzo in Austria-Hungary, while his soldiers adored him and called him Naš Sveto! ("Our Sveto!"). For valor in combat, he was promoted to the rank of Generaloberst on 1 May 1916. On 23 August 1917 he rose to the position of commander of the Southwestern Front, which was later renamed Army Group Boroević. He would later fight at the Battle of Caporetto. In January 1918, he opposed Hungarian proposals to split Austria-Hungary's Army into separate Austrian and Hungarian units. He became Field Marshal on 1 February 1918 and was also awarded numerous medals, including the highest order for Austro-Hungarian soldiers, the Military Order of Maria Theresia. He led to defeat the southern prong of the last Austro-Hungarian offensive at the Battle of the Piave River. The front was maintained until end of October 1918, when the Italian army launched the decisive offensive of Vittorio Veneto and non-Austrian troops left their positions following the secessions of their nations from the dual monarchy (Czechs on 28 October, South Slavs on 29 October, Slovaks on 30 October, Hungary on 31 October). After that Boroević fell back to Velden, where he sent a telegram to the Emperor offering to march on Vienna to fight the anti-Habsburg revolution in the imperial capital. It is not certain whether the Emperor was given this message (Boroević doubted it); the offer was refused on behalf of the Emperor. After the Imperial & Royal Army had been demobilized by the Emperor on 6 November, Boroević was retired, by the I & R War Ministry in liquidation, by 1 December 1918.

=== After the war ===
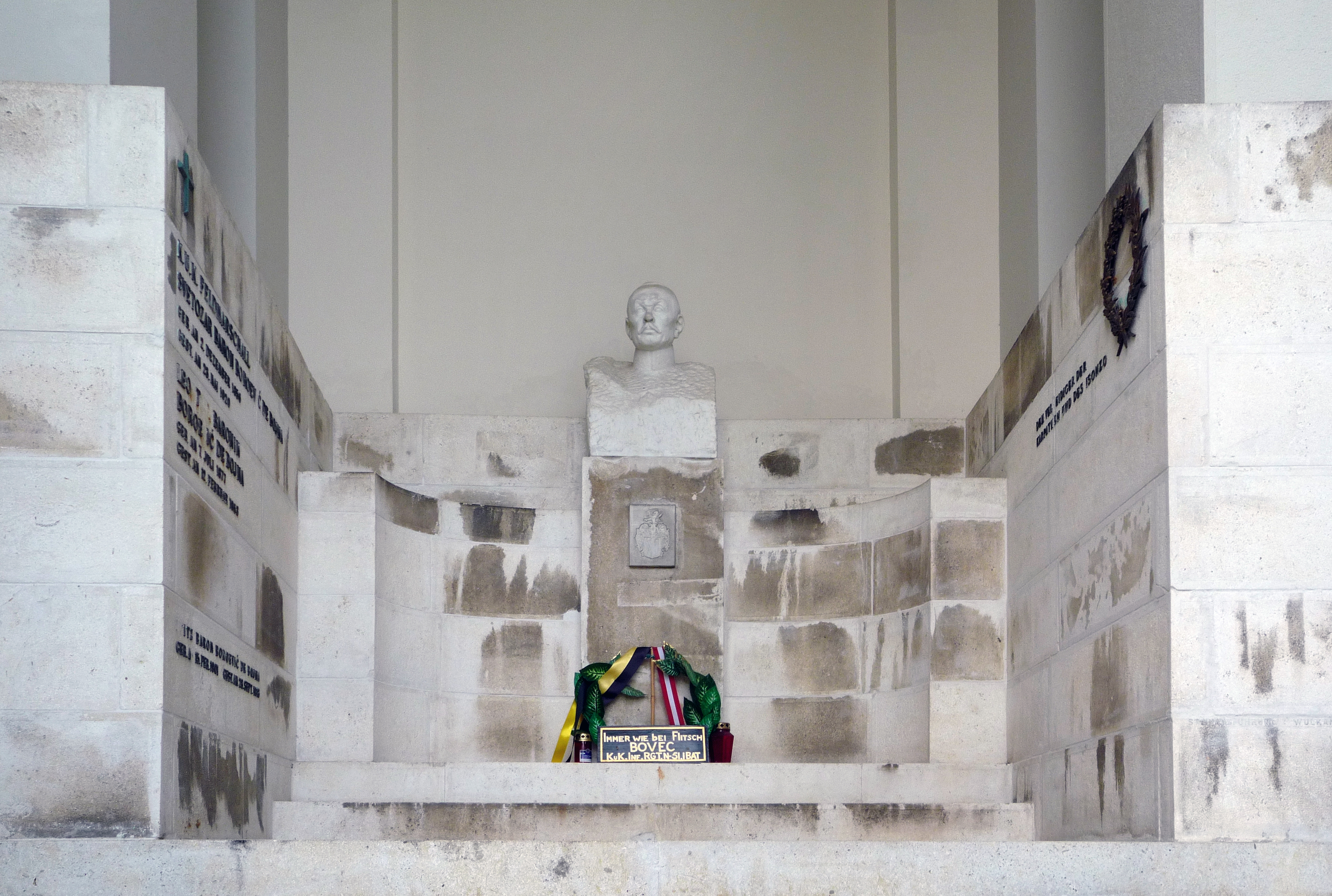
Tomb of Boroević at the Zentralfriedhof in Vienna, Austria

After the demise and disintegration of Austria-Hungary, Boroević decided to become a citizen of the newly created Kingdom of Serbs, Croats and Slovenes. He was not welcome despite offering his services to the National Council of Slovenes, Croats and Serbs. So he stayed in Carinthia, now Austria's southernmost state; his personal belongings, which were on transport in Slovenia, the former Austrian crownland of Carniola, were confiscated there. Boroević could not understand the mean treatment he had to experience, "the only field marshal the Southern Slavs had ever produced", as he wrote in his memoirs.

Boroević died in a hospital at Klagenfurt, the capital city of Carinthia. His body was transferred to Vienna where he was entombed at the Central Cemetery (Grave no. 62 in the New Arcades to the right of the Church of St. Charles Borromeo). The grave had been paid for by the former emperor Charles, who lived in Switzerland then. He could not take part in the funeral, since he had been banished from Austria for his lifetime by the Habsburg Law since 3 April 1919.

== Honors ==
=== Honorary degree ===
In 1916, with the approval of the Emperor Franz Joseph I, on the proposal of the Faculty of Law and the Senate of the University of Zagreb, Svetozar Borojević and Archduke Eugen were awarded the university's highest honorary degree, Doctor Honoris Causa in the field of social sciences, for their victory over the enemy and especially for the protection of hereditary grudge, and rights and cultural progress of Croats ("Ob eximia in limitibus imperii strenue defendendis ac imprimis in Croatum paterno solo iuribus atque litterarum et artium progressu tuendis merita"). The award ceremonies were held on 30 January 1916 (for Archduke Eugen) and 1 February 1916 (for Svetozar Borojević) at the Fifth Army's military apartment, 305 Military Field Post on the Italian front. Delegation for the award was made of Josip Šilović; Milorad Stražnicki, dean of the Faculty of Law; Fran Barac, rector; Robert Frangeš-Mihanović, sculptor; and Andrija Kišur, clerk.

=== Honorary citizenship ===
Croatia

- Honorary citizen of Karlovac, 1915.
- Honorary citizen of Sinj, November 1915; Sinj Municipality Council determined that the most beautiful street in the city would bear his name.
- Honorary citizen of Požega, Slavonski Brod and Varaždin, November 1915.
- Honorary citizen of Zagreb, March 1916.
- Honorary citizen of Pazin, 5 May 1916. On 13 August 1919, during the occupation of Istria by the Kingdom of Italy, the City Assembly revoked his title.
- Honorary citizen of Janjina municipality, May 1917.
- Honorary citizen of Bakar, Koprivnica, Hrvatska Kostajnica and Petrinja.

Slovenia

- Honorary citizen of Ljubljana, August 1915; revoked in 1919, returned in 2009.
- Honorary citizen of Ajdovščina (1915), Renče and Goče (1916), Vitovlje (1916), Šempas, Sežana.

== See also ==
- Royal Croatian Home Guard
- List of Military Order of Maria Theresa recipients of Croatian descent
- List of Austrian field marshals
