= Dužica =

Coordinates: 45°32′N 16°14′E

- Village
- Interactive map of Dužica
- Country: Croatia
- County: Sisak-Moslavina County
- Municipality: Lekenik

Area
  - Total: 17.5 km^{2} (6.8 sq mi)

Population (2021)
  - Total: 288
  - Density: 16.5/km^{2} (42.6/sq mi)
- Time zone: UTC+1 (CET)
  - Summer (DST): UTC+2 (CEST)

Dužica is a village in Croatia. It is connected by the D30 highway.
