= D408 road =

Road in Croatia

D408 state road

Route information
- Length: 3.8 km (2.4 mi)

Major junctions
- From: Zagreb Airport
- To: D30 near Velika Gorica

Location
- Country: Croatia
- Counties: Zagreb County
- Major cities: Velika Gorica

Highway system
- Highways in Croatia

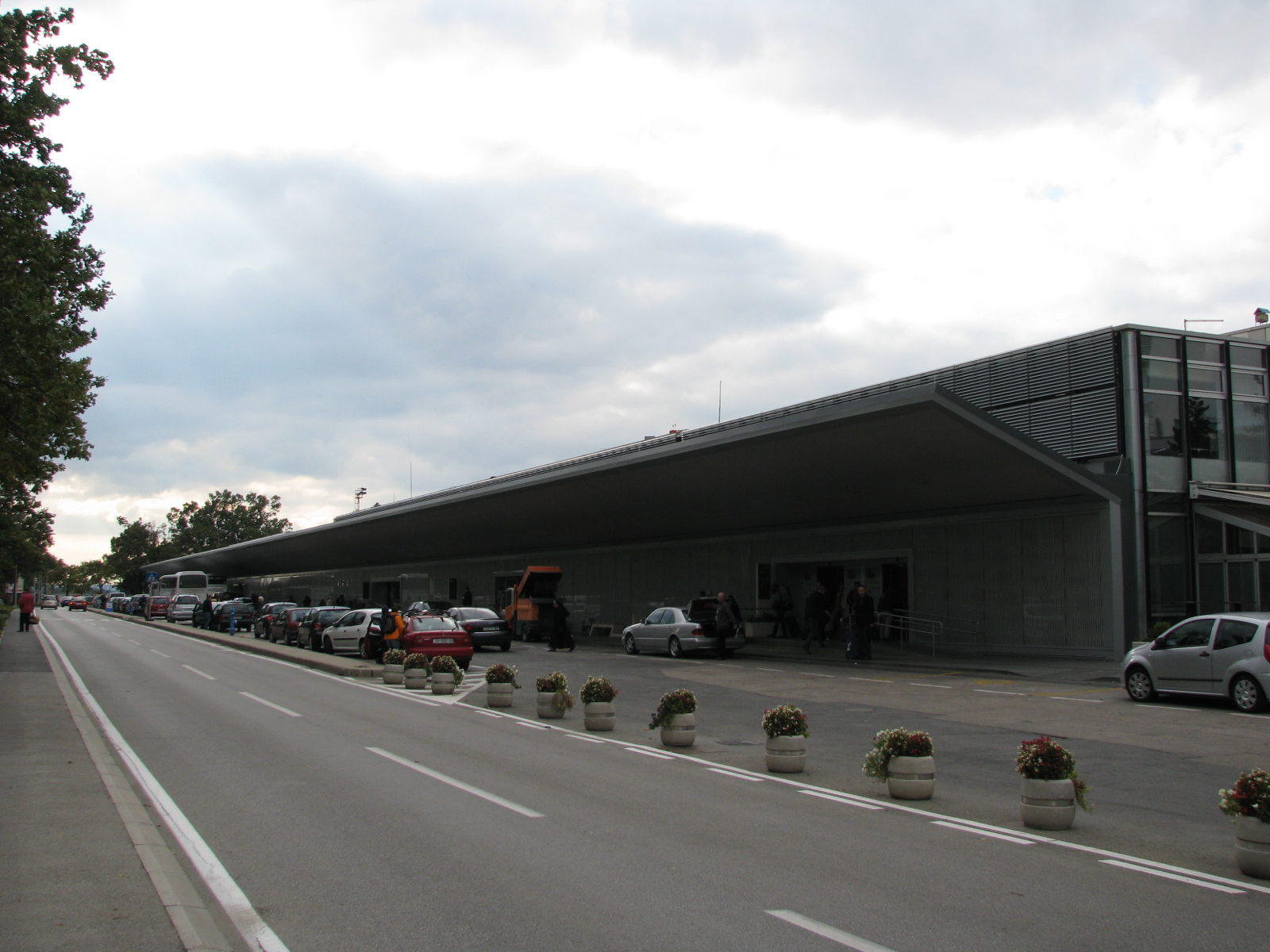
Zagreb Airport (the main entrance), at the eastern terminus of the D408 road

D408 is a four lane state road branching off from the D30 state road connecting Zagreb Airport to Croatian motorway network via A3 motorway Kosnica interchange and to the cities of Zagreb and Velika Gorica. The road is 3.8 km (2.4 mi) long.

The road, as well as all other state roads in Croatia, is managed and maintained by Hrvatske ceste, state owned company.

== Road junctions and populated areas ==
D30 junctions/populated areas
Type	Slip roads/Notes
	Zagreb Airport; The western terminus of the road.
	The western terminus of the suburban double carriage road.
	To Zagreb via Zagrebačka Road.
	Velika Gorica
	D30 to Sisak and Petrinja (to the south), and the A3 motorway Kosnica interchange and Zagreb (to the north). The eastern terminus of the road.

== See also ==
- Zagreb Airport
