= Brežane Lekeničke =

Coordinates: 45°35′N 16°09′E

- Village
- Interactive map of Brežane Lekeničke
- Country: Croatia
- County: Sisak-Moslavina County
- Municipality: Lekenik

Area
  - Total: 20.6 km^{2} (8.0 sq mi)

Population (2021)
  - Total: 260
  - Density: 13/km^{2} (33/sq mi)
- Time zone: UTC+1 (CET)
  - Summer (DST): UTC+2 (CEST)

Brežane Lekeničke is a village in Croatia.

Settlement of Brežane Lekeničke: Population trends 1857–2021
v

population	168	215	213	291	356	393	388	435	452	469	450	332	281	299	281	302	260
	1857	1869	1880	1890	1900	1910	1921	1931	1948	1953	1961	1971	1981	1991	2001	2011	2021

Note:Shown as Brežani from 1857 to 1890, Brežane in 1900, Lekenički Brežani from 1910 to 1948, and Brežane Lekeničke since 1953 Sources: Croatian Bureau of Statistics publications
