= Mraclin =

- Village
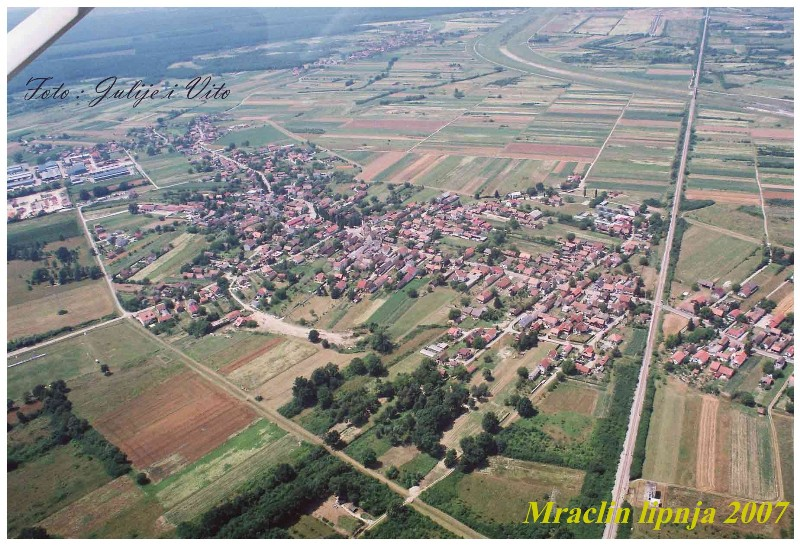
- Mraclin in June 2007

- Location within Croatia
- Coordinates: 45°40′N 16°06′E
- Country: Croatia
- Region: Central Croatia
- County: Zagreb County
- Municipality: Velika Gorica

Area
  - Total: 14.0 km^{2} (5.4 sq mi)

Population (2021)
  - Total: 1,026
  - Density: 73.3/km^{2} (190/sq mi)
- Time zone: UTC+1 (CET)
  - Summer (DST): UTC+2 (CEST)

Mraclin is a village in Croatia approximately 20 kilometers south of Zagreb, near the city of Velika Gorica.

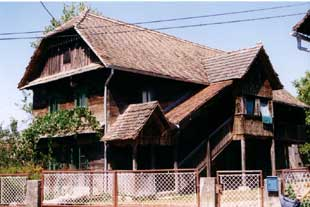
In Mraclin, there are many preserved chardaks, traditional wooden houses built in the region of Turopolje.

The name of Mraclin was documented as early as 1249 and 1255, as Mrachlin. The toponym is likely derived from the names of either Martinus or Marcellus, who could have been landowners in the area, or saints with a local church dedicated to them. Mraclin's church of St. Vitus was established between 1642 and 1688.

== Bibliography ==
- Cvetnić, Marija (December 1993). "Vidovo u Mraclinu" (PDF). Etnološka tribina (in Croatian). 23 (16). Department of Ethnology and Cultural Anthropology, Faculty of Humanities and Social Sciences, University of Zagreb: 133–137.
- Laszowski, Emilij (1910). Povijest plemenite općine Turopolje (in Croatian). Vol. I–II. Zagreb.
