= Hrašće Turopoljsko =

- Village
- Location within Croatia
- Coordinates: 45°44′N 16°00′E
- Country: Croatia
- County: City of Zagreb

Area
  - Total: 1.0 sq mi (2.7 km^{2})

Population (2021)
  - Total: 1,232
  - Density: 1,200/sq mi (460/km^{2})
- Time zone: UTC+1 (CET)
  - Summer (DST): UTC+2 (CEST)

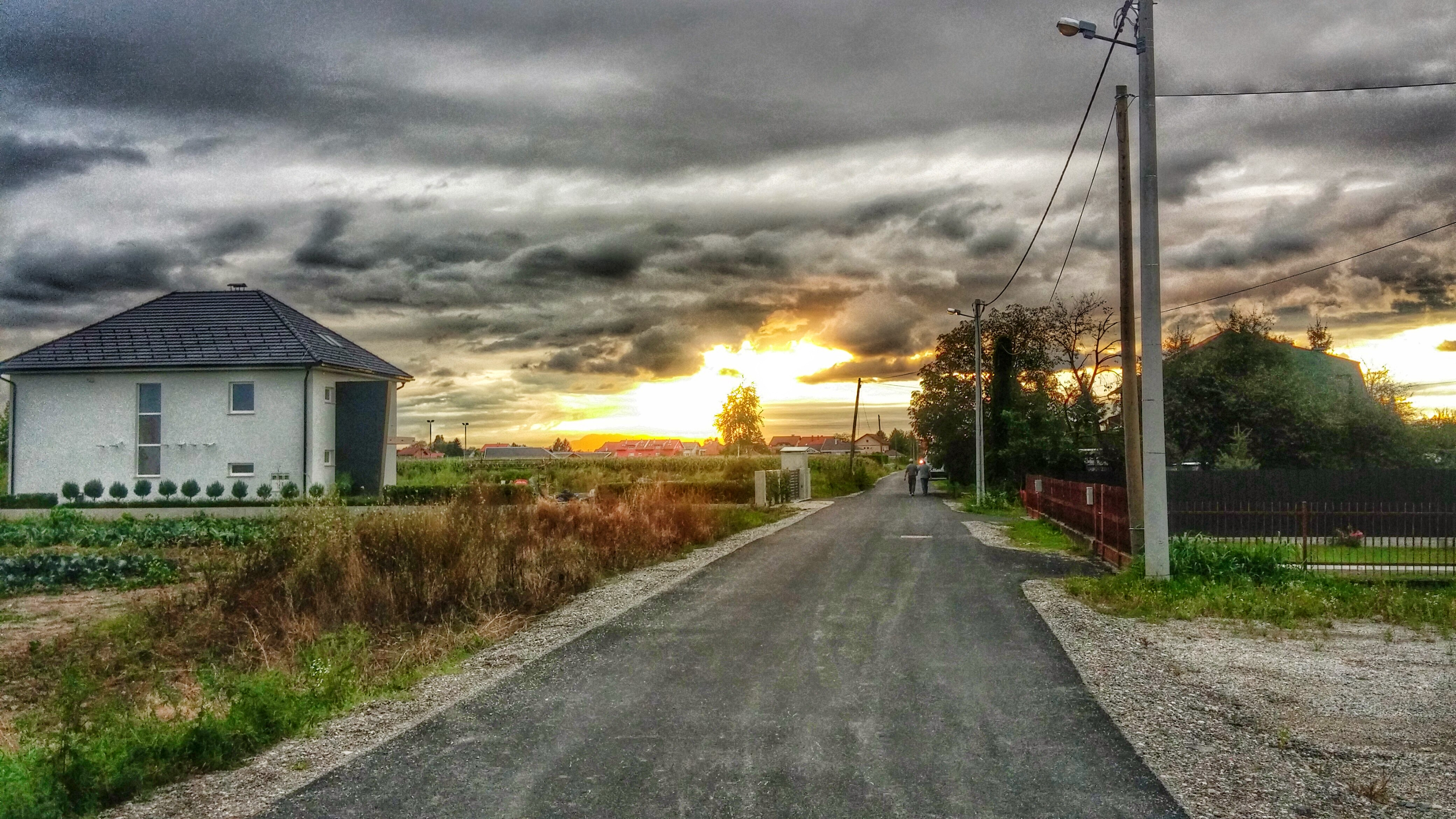

Hrašće Turopoljsko is a village in Croatia. It is formally a settlement (naselje) of Zagreb, the capital of Croatia.

== Demographics ==
According to the 2021 census, its population was 1,232. According to the 2011 census, it had 1,202 inhabitants.
