= Sunja (Sava) =

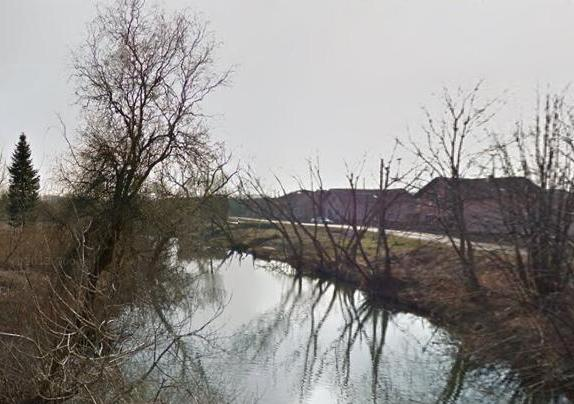

Location
- Country: Croatia

Physical characteristics
- Mouth
  - location: Sava
  - coordinates: 45.3139°N 16.7804°E
- Length: 69 km (43 mi)
- Basin size: 462 km^{2} (178 sq mi)

Basin features
- Progression: Sava→ Danube→ Black Sea

Sunja is a river in central Croatia, a right tributary of Sava. It is 69 kilometres (43 mi) long and its basin covers an area of 462 square kilometres (178 sq mi).

Sunja rises in the mountainous forested areas of Zrinska Gora, south of the village of Lovča. It flows northward until it turns southeast at Komogovina, and then north again near Majur. It turns east at the eponymous village of Sunja and continues through Lonjsko Polje until it merges into the Sava east of Krapje.

It's been suggested that the names "Sava", "Sunja" and "Sutla" are related, but this is uncertain.
