= Mala Gorica, Sisak-Moslavina County =

Coordinates: 45°28′59″N 16°15′00″E

Mala Gorica
- Village
- Interactive map of Mala Gorica
- Country: Croatia
- Region: Continental Croatia (Banovina)
- County: Sisak-Moslavina
- Municipality: Petrinja

Area
  - Total: 8.7 km^{2} (3.4 sq mi)

Population (2021)
  - Total: 296
  - Density: 34/km^{2} (88/sq mi)
- Time zone: UTC+1 (CET)
  - Summer (DST): UTC+2 (CEST)

Mala Gorica is a village in Croatia. The film The Fiddler on the Roof was partly filmed there. The film ends with the credit: "Our thanks to the people of the villages of Lekenik and Mala Gorica and the city of Zagreb, Yugoslavia."
