= Lekenik =

- Municipality
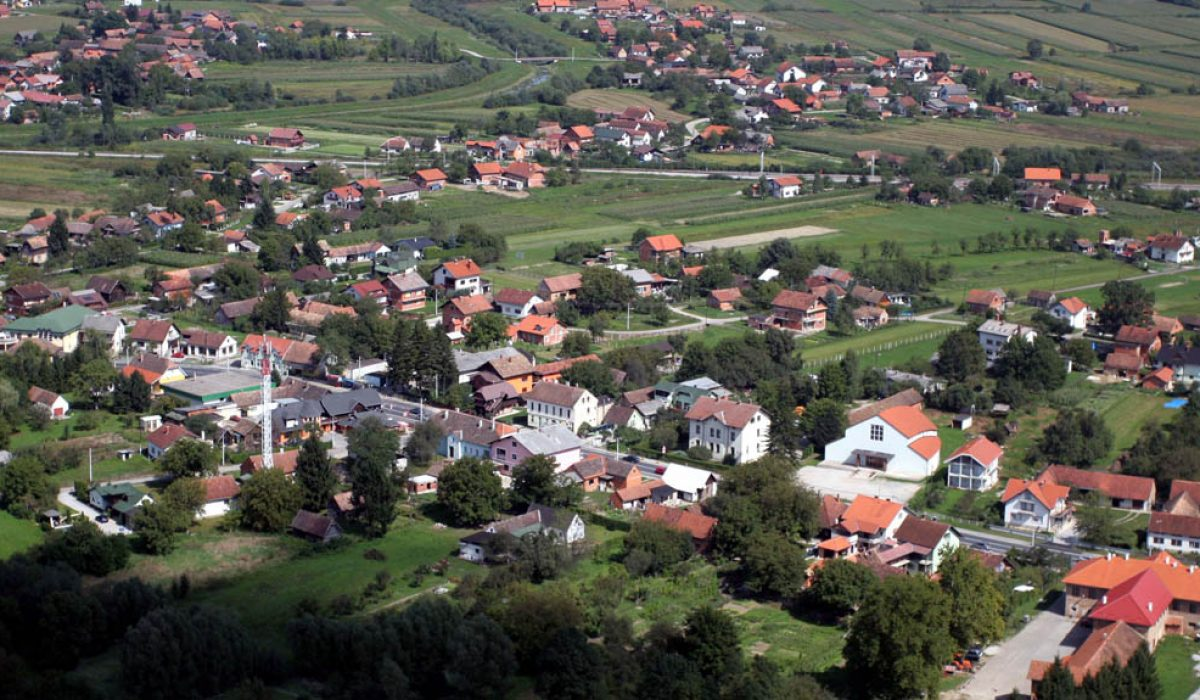
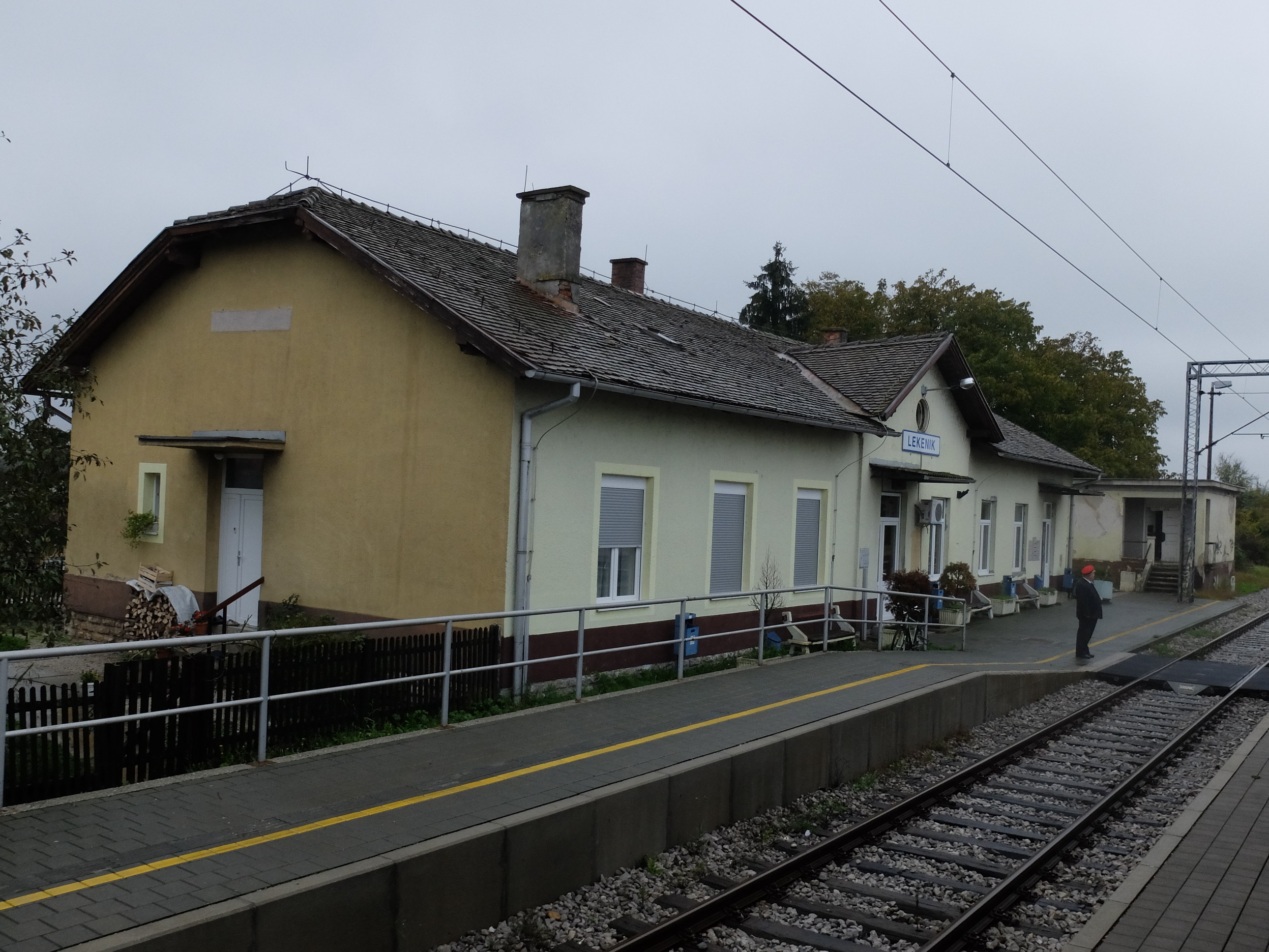
- Panoramic view Lekenik railway station

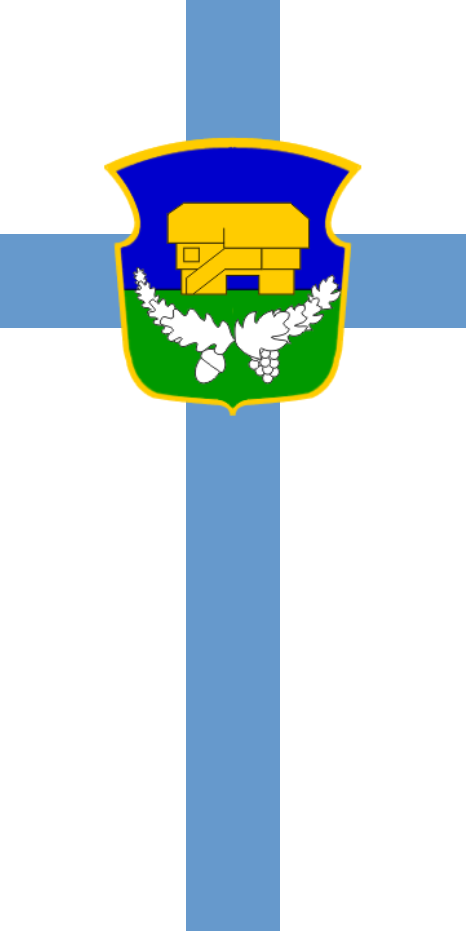
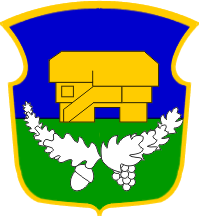
- Flag Seal
- Interactive map of Lekenik
- Location of Lekenik in Croatia
- Coordinates: 45°35′N 16°13′E
- Country: Croatia
- Region: Central Croatia (Turopolje)
- County: Sisak-Moslavina County

Government
  - Mayor: Božidar Antolec (Independent)

Area
  - Municipality: 228.2 km^{2} (88.1 sq mi)
  - Urban: 29.5 km^{2} (11.4 sq mi)

Population (2021)
  - Municipality: 5,343
  - Density: 23.41/km^{2} (60.64/sq mi)
  - Urban: 1,697
  - Urban density: 57.5/km^{2} (149/sq mi)
- Website: lekenik.hr

Lekenik is a village and a municipality in central Croatia, located between Sisak and Velika Gorica in the lowland region of Turopolje.

Norman Jewison chose Lekenik to represent Anatevka for the 1971 film Fiddler on the Roof, after visiting other sites in Austria, Canada, and Romania. The film ends with the credit: "Our thanks to the people of the villages of Lekenik and Mala Gorica and the city of Zagreb, Yugoslavia."

It is well known in Croatia for hosting two SOS Children's Villages (SOS Dječje selo).

== Population ==
In the 2011 census, the total population of Lekenik municipality was 6,032 people, in the following settlements:

- Brežane Lekeničke, population 302
- Brkiševina, population 95
- Cerje Letovanićko, population 73
- Donji Vukojevac, population 499
- Dužica, population 353
- Gornji Vukojevac, population 67
- Lekenik, population 1,897
- Letovanić, population 464
- Palanjek Pokupski, population 9
- Pešćenica, population 883
- Petrovec, population 334
- Pokupsko Vratečko, population 23
- Poljana Lekenička, population 283
- Stari Brod, population 166
- Stari Farkašić, population 86
- Šišinec, population 78
- Vrh Letovanićki, population 65
- Žažina, population 355

In the same census, an absolute majority were Croats at 97%.

== Climate ==
Since records began in 1981, the highest temperature recorded at the Vukojevac weather station was 39.1 °C (102.4 °F), on 6 August 2012. The coldest temperature was −26.4 °C (−15.5 °F), on 12 January 1985.

== Media ==
RTL Radio—Local radio station.
