= Donji Kukuruzari =

Donji Kukuruzari Доњи Кукурузари (Serbian)
- Municipality
- Općina Donji Kukuruzari; Municipality of Donji Kukuruzari
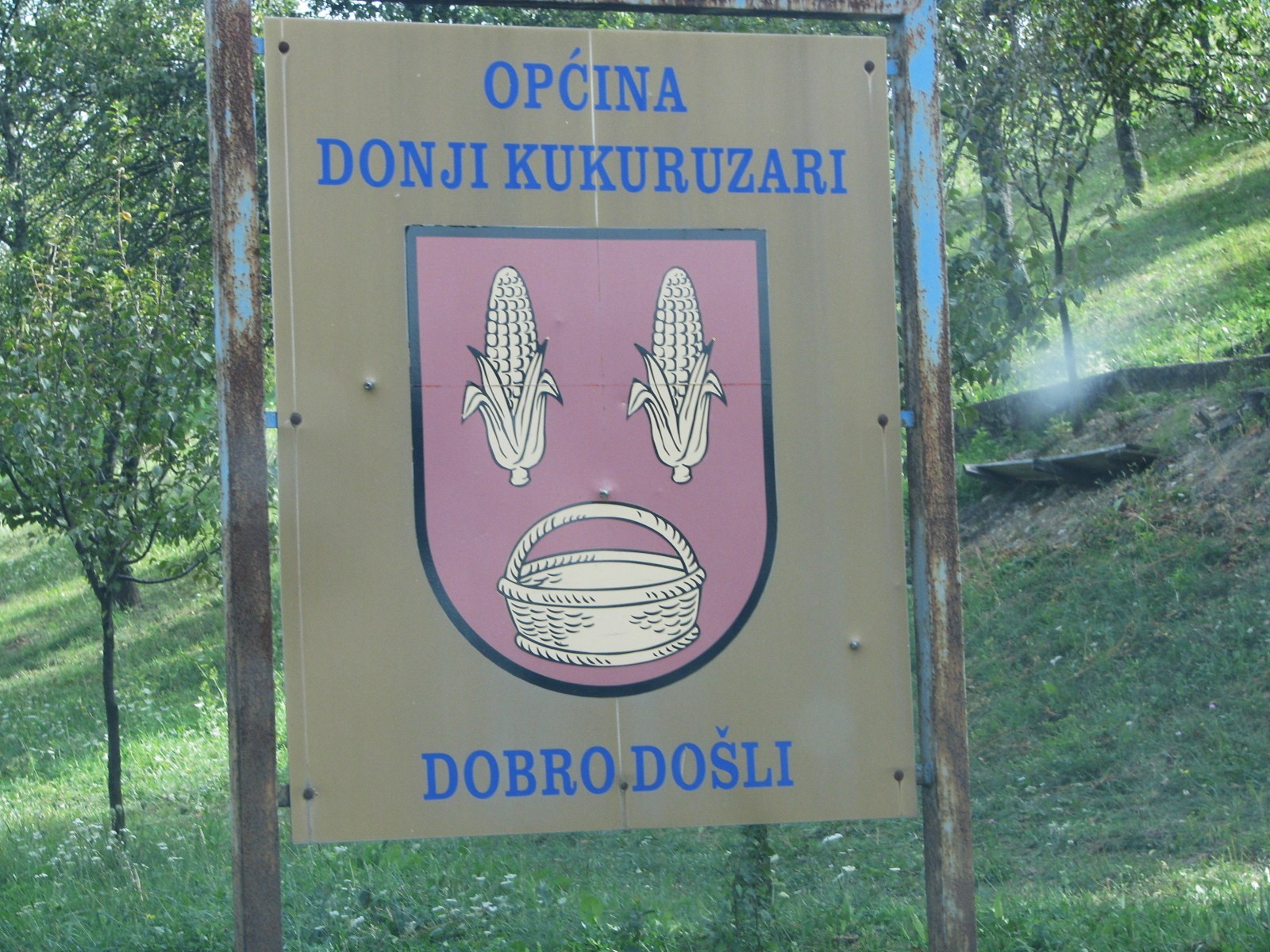

- Coat of arms

- Location of Donji Kukuruzari in Croatia
- Coordinates: 45.264602°N 16.483845°E
- Country: Croatia
- Region: Central Croatia (Banovina)
- County: Sisak-Moslavina County

Area
  - Municipality: 113.9 km^{2} (44.0 sq mi)
  - Urban: 5.5 km^{2} (2.1 sq mi)

Population (2021)
  - Municipality: 1,080
  - Density: 9.48/km^{2} (24.6/sq mi)
  - Urban: 188
  - Urban density: 34/km^{2} (89/sq mi)
- Website: donji-kukuruzari.hr

Donji Kukuruzari (Serbian Cyrillic: Доњи Кукурузари) is a village and a municipality in Croatia in the Sisak-Moslavina County. Donji Kukuruzari is underdeveloped municipality which is statistically classified as the First Category Area of Special State Concern by the Government of Croatia.

It has a population of 1,634 (census 2011), in the following settlements:

- Babina Rijeka, population 127
- Borojevići, population 119
- Donja Velešnja, population 261
- Donji Bjelovac, population 43
- Donji Kukuruzari, population 297
- Gornja Velešnja, population 73
- Gornji Bjelovac, population 53
- Gornji Kukuruzari, population 51
- Knezovljani, population 81
- Komogovina, population 126
- Kostreši Bjelovački, population 43
- Lovča, population 19
- Mečenčani, population 148
- Prevršac, population 120
- Umetić, population 73

== Demographics ==
- 1991 Serbs were majority 249 (82.72%), then Croats 43 (14.28%), Yugoslavs 2 (0.66%) and others 7 (2.32%).
- 2011 census, 64.44% (1053) were Croats and 34.82% (569) were Serbs.

== Politics ==
=== Minority councils and representatives ===
Directly elected minority councils and representatives are tasked with consulting tasks for the local or regional authorities in which they are advocating for minority rights and interests, integration into public life and participation in the management of local affairs. At the 2023 Croatian national minorities councils and representatives elections Serbs of Croatia fulfilled legal requirements to elect 10 members minority council of the Municipality of Donji Kukuruzari.

In November 2023, the Government of the Republic of Croatia decided to declare an end to mandatory bilingualism in Donji Kukuruzari on the basis of the 2021 census, which showed the Serbian population fraction had fallen below the required one third, at 31.2%.

== Religion ==
=== Serbian Orthodox Church of the Dormition of the Theotokos ===
Serbian Orthodox Church of the Dormition of the Theotokos in Donji Kukuruzari was completed in 1838 while its iconostasis was painted in 1871 by painter Mihail Kutlija from Jasenovac. The church was devastated by the Ustashe regime during the World War II Genocide of Serbs in the Independent State of Croatia. The church's ring-bell was reconstructed just before the beginning of the Croatian War of Independence and it contained some of the icons originating from the nearby prominent Komogovina School of Orthodox art.

== Notable people ==
- Teodor Komogovinski
