= Buševec =

Coordinates: 45°38′N 16°07′E

- Village
- Interactive map of Buševec
- Country: Croatia
- Region: Central Croatia
- County: Zagreb County
- Municipality: Velika Gorica

Area
  - Total: 3.0 sq mi (7.7 km^{2})

Population (2021)
  - Total: 1,018
  - Density: 340/sq mi (130/km^{2})
- Time zone: UTC+1 (CET)
  - Summer (DST): UTC+2 (CEST)

Buševec is the name of a Croatian village that falls under the administration of the town of Velika Gorica. It is placed at the Turopolje area at the highway between Zagreb and Sisak. The village has 886 inhabitants (2011 census), and its postal code is 10417.

== History ==
Situated near the border to the Ottoman Empire, Buševec suffered during the 16th century a high number of Turkish attacks which reduced the number of inhabitants significantly. The name "Buševec" very likely came from a kin named Buševec whose members were all killed or abducted into slavery by the Turks. In the 17th century new "pleme", i.e. kin, settled in Buševec, most of them living there until today. In 1768 a little wooden chapel (church of the holy Apostle) was built that was the center of the religious life in Buševec until a new church was built at the beginning of the new millennium. For reasons unknown at the beginning of the 20th century, the chapel was devoted to John the Baptist.

As a result of a high number of fatal fires in 1900 a volunteer fire department was established, in 1908 a 5-year-primary school opened, and in 1934 the sport-club "Seljak" ("Farmer") which is today named "Polet", was founded.
