= Mečenčani =

Coordinates: 45°17′N 16°26′E

Mečenčani Меченчани (Serbian)
- Village
- Interactive map of Mečenčani
- Country: Croatia
- Region: Continental Croatia (Banovina)
- County: Sisak-Moslavina
- Municipality: Donji Kukuruzari

Area
  - Total: 9.5 km^{2} (3.7 sq mi)

Population (2021)
  - Total: 103
  - Density: 11/km^{2} (28/sq mi)
- Time zone: UTC+1 (CET)
  - Summer (DST): UTC+2 (CEST)

Mečenčani (Serbian Cyrillic: Меченчани) is a village in the Donji Kukuruzari municipality, Central Croatia.

== Geography ==
The village is located in the region of Banovina (known as Banija).

== History ==
In 1905, the municipality of Mečenčani existed in the Zagreb County of Kingdom of Croatia-Slavonia, having 5025 people, of whom Serbs of the Orthodox faith numbered 4574 (91.1%).

It was previously part of the Kostajnica municipality. Before the outbreak of the Croatian War, the SAO Krajina (1990-1991) was self-proclaimed in the region by ethnic Serbs of Croatia. The region was subsequently reintegrated into Croatia after Operation Storm.

After the 2020 Petrinja earthquake, more than 50 large sinkholes appeared in the Mečenčani area, endangering the population. The deepest of these sinkholes was approximately 15 metres (50 ft) deep.

== Demographics ==
Demographic history
Ethnic group	1948	1953	1961	1971	1981	1991	2001
Serbs						213 (97.70%)	
Croats						1 (0.45%)	
Yugoslavs						4 (1.83%)	
Others and unknown						0	
Total	307	341	313	245	237	218	168

== Religion ==
=== Orthodox Church of the Intercession of the Theotokos ===
Neoclassicist Orthodox Church of the Intercession of the Theotokos in Mečenčani was completed in 1877. Its icons were originally made for the Orthodox Church of the Dormition of the Theotokos in Donji Kukuruzari. The church is made by father of Svetozar Borojević, Adam Borojević.
