= Poljana Lekenička =

Coordinates: 45°34′N 16°12′E

- Village
- Interactive map of Poljana Lekenička
- Country: Croatia
- County: Sisak-Moslavina County
- Municipality: Lekenik

Area
  - Total: 11.8 km^{2} (4.6 sq mi)

Population (2021)
  - Total: 248
  - Density: 21.0/km^{2} (54.4/sq mi)
- Time zone: UTC+1 (CET)
  - Summer (DST): UTC+2 (CEST)

Poljana Lekenička is a village in Croatia.

== History ==
On 25 March 2022 at 10:11 the DVD Lekenik received a call about a wildfire in the area. 6 hectares (15 acres) burned by the time it was put out at 13:57.
