= Madžari, Croatia =

Madžari
- Village
- Location within Croatia
- Coordinates: 45°23′N 16°24′E
- Country: Croatia
- County: Sisak-Moslavina County
- Municipality: Sisak

Area
  - Total: 8.4 km^{2} (3.2 sq mi)

Population (2021)
  - Total: 199
  - Density: 24/km^{2} (61/sq mi)
- Time zone: UTC+1 (CET)
  - Summer (DST): UTC+2 (CEST)

Madžari is a village in Croatia.
