= Pešćenica, Sisak-Moslavina County =

Coordinates: 45°36′N 16°10′E

Pešćenica
- Village
- Interactive map of Pešćenica
- Country: Croatia

Area
  - Total: 16.4 km^{2} (6.3 sq mi)

Population (2021)
  - Total: 795
  - Density: 48.5/km^{2} (126/sq mi)
- Time zone: UTC+1 (CET)
  - Summer (DST): UTC+2 (CEST)

Pešćenica is a village in Croatia. It is connected by the D30 highway.
