= Komogovina =

Komogovina Комоговина (Serbian)
- Village
- Location in Croatia
- Coordinates: 45°18′18″N 16°22′42″E
- Country: Croatia
- Region: Continental Croatia (Banovina)
- County: Sisak-Moslavina
- Municipality: Donji Kukuruzari

Area
  - Total: 4.0 sq mi (10.4 km^{2})

Population (2021)
  - Total: 76
  - Density: 19/sq mi (7.3/km^{2})
- Time zone: UTC+1 (CET)
  - Summer (DST): UTC+2 (CEST)

Komogovina (Serbian Cyrillic: Комоговина) is a village in the Donji Kukuruzari municipality of central Croatia.

It is the location of the Serbian Orthodox Komogovina Monastery.

== Notable people ==
- Ratko Dmitrović
