= D224 road =

Road in Croatia

D224 state road

Route information
- Length: 34.2 km (21.3 mi)

Major junctions
- From: D37 in Mošćenica
- To: D30 in Panjani

Location
- Country: Croatia
- Counties: Sisak-Moslavina
- Major cities: Sunja

Highway system
- Highways in Croatia

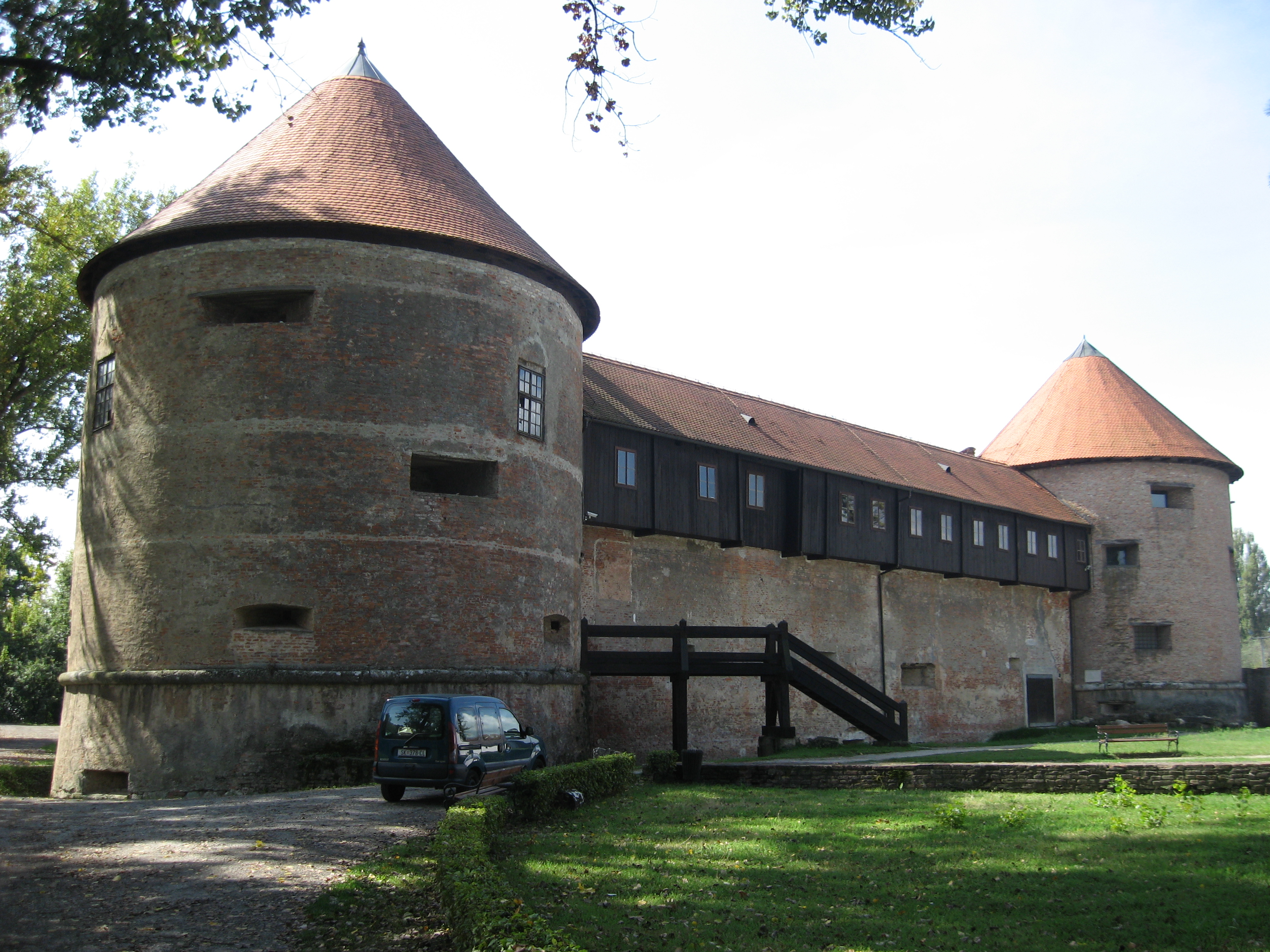
Sisak, near the northern terminus of the D224 road

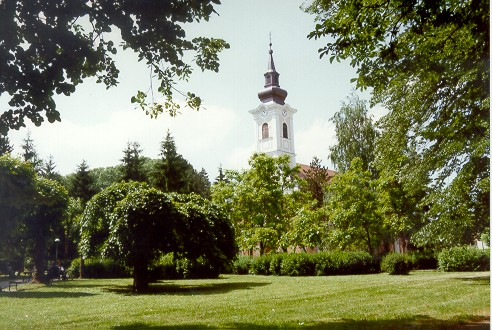
Petrinja, near the northern terminus of the D224 road

D224 is a state road in Banovina region of Croatia connecting Sisak, Petrinja and Sunja. The road is 34.2 km (21.3 mi) long.

As with all other state roads in Croatia, the D224 is managed and maintained by Hrvatske ceste, state owned company.

== Traffic volume ==
Traffic is regularly counted and reported by Hrvatske ceste, operator of the road.

D224 traffic volume
Road	Counting site	AADT	ASDT	Notes
D224	3303 Komarevo	2,151	2,381	Adjacent to the Ž3244 junction.
D224	3304 Sunja	2,541	2,834	Adjacent to the Ž3211 junction.
D224	3309 Gornji Hrastovac	824	922	Adjacent to the L33126 junction.

== Road junctions and populated areas ==
D224 junctions/populated areas
Type	Slip roads/Notes
	Mošćenica; D37 to Sisak (D36) and Petrinja (D30). The northern terminus of the road.
	Novo Pračno
	Gornje Komarevo; Ž3208 to Mađari and Blinja (D30).
	Donje Komarevo
	Blinjski Kut
	Brđani Cesta
	Petrinjci
	Ž3244 to Drljača and Mala Gradusa.
	Sunja; Ž3211 to Gornja Letina. Ž3294 to Hrvatska Dubica (D47) and Hrvatska Dubica border crossing to Bosnia and Herzegovina.
	Vedro Polje
	Donji Hrastovec
	Gornji Hrastovec
	Graboštani; Ž3245 to Veliko Krčevo.
	Stubalj
	Majur
	Panjani; D30 to Hrvatska Kostajnica (to the south) and to Petrinja (to the north). The southern terminus of the road.
