= Komarevo =

Komarevo may refer to:

- In Bulgaria (written in Cyrillic as Комарево):
  - Komarevo, Montana Province - a village in Berkovitsa municipality, Montana Province
  - Komarevo, Pleven Province - a village in Dolna Mitropoliya Municipality, Pleven Province
  - Komarevo, Varna Province - a village in Provadiya Municipality, Varna Province
  - Komarevo, Vratsa Province - a village in Byala Slatina municipality, Vratsa Province
- Donje Komarevo, a village near Sisak, Croatia
- Gornje Komarevo, a village near Sisak, Croatia
