= Bekim Berisha =

Croatian army officer, Kosovo Liberation Army officer (1966–1988)

- Nicknames: Šok, Abeja
- Born: 15 June 1966; Graboc near Pejë, SFR Yugoslavia (now Kosovo)
- Died: 10 August 1998 (aged 32) Junik, FR Yugoslavia (now Kosovo)
- Allegiance: Croatia; Bosnia and Herzegovina; Kosova
- Branch: Croatian Defence Forces; Croatian Army; Bosnian Army; Kosovo Liberation Army
- Service years: 1991–1998
- Rank: General of Croatian Army; Brigadier General of Kosovo Protection Corps (posthumously)
- Conflicts: Croatian War of Independence: Battle of Vukovar; Battle of Gospić; Bosnian War: Operation Corridor 92; Kosovo War: Battle of Gllogjan; Yugoslav offensive in Kosovo (1998); Battle of Junik †
- Awards: Order of Nikola Šubić Zrinski (2); Hero of Kosovo; Order of the Croatian Cross

Bekim Berisha (Croatian: Bekim Beriša; 15 June 1966 – 10 August 1998) was a Kosovo Albanian soldier who gained prominence in the Yugoslav Wars. He served in the Croatian Army during the Croatian War of Independence. He subsequently fought in the Army of the Republic of Bosnia and Herzegovina, and later also in the Kosovo Liberation Army (KLA), where he was named a general. He was killed in 1998, during the Battle of Junik, and was posthumously promoted to Brigadier General.

== Early years ==
Berisha was born and raised in Graboc near Pejë, SFR Yugoslavia (modern-day Kosovo) as the youngest of six children of Fazli and Fahrije Berisha.

His grandfather Nexhip Selmani fought against Yugoslav authorities in Kosovo for decades. After attending secondary school in Pejë, he decided to go to SR Croatia due to not being able to continue school in Kosovo. During his first period in Croatia, Bekim maintained mostly physical jobs to earn a living and send money back to the family in Kosovo. After a while, he also registered as a student in the Zagreb University studying as a veterinary. He finished his studies with success, also maintaining one of his favorite hobbies, military art and martial art. After a few years in Croatia, Bekim moved to the Netherlands where he got engaged and settled.

== War in Croatia and Bosnia ==
When the Croatian War of Independence started, Berisha left his life in the West behind him at the age of 25, and came back to Croatia on 7 August 1991 to volunteer in the Croatian National Guard as part of the 57th Independent Battalion in Sisak. He joined a battalion defending the twin villages of Donje Komarevo and Gornje Komarevo near Sisak. He later participated in many battles in eastern Slavonia, in the front-lines against the Yugoslav People's Army.

During the Croatian War he was also interviewed by BBC where he declared that Croatia within only a couple of months would be free of Serbian soldiers as the war went very well. Only days later, the final Croatian offensive began and Bekim was one of the front-line soldiers.

He also took part in the Bosnian War, during the Operation Corridor 92, he was heavily injured after being hit by six bullets on 16 June 1992. He was taken to a military hospital in Croatia and later returned to the front line once again.

== Kosovo War ==
In 1998, Berisha shifted his focus to support the ethnic Albanian faction in Kosovo. Ethnic Albanians in the region were initiating military actions against the Yugoslav authorities stationed there. Berisha emerged as a pivotal figure in the early stages of the Kosovo Liberation Army efforts. In early 1998, he clandestinely entered Kosovo from Albania alongside several militants. They settled in the village of Açarevë, in the Drenica valley, where they began organizing various attacks in the region. Berisha played a crucial role as a consultant and commander, overseeing the training of new recruits.

The situation in the western part of Kosovo, particularly in Dukagjin—Berisha’s home region—worsened as Yugoslav police intensified their efforts.In response, Berisha, with his close friend and fellow combatant Bedri Shala, traveled to Glogjan, a small town near his hometown of Graboc. In Glogjan, they joined forces with other KLA militants, including Ramush Haradinaj and his brother, to defend the village against a Serbian police raid. Berisha was a key figure in the Battle of Glodjane, responsible for logistics, communication, and the movement of militants in and out of the area.

Ramush Haradinaj, the commander in chief of the region, assigned Berisha and Bedri Shala to the town of Junik. Junik held strategic importance for both the Kosovo Liberation Army and the Yugoslav People's Army, serving as one of the main KLA strongholds during the conflict. Berisha and Shala’s efforts significantly contributed to the defense against a much better-equipped Yugoslav Army.

During the battle, Berisha advocated for a reorganization of the KLA, proposing a shift in strategy towards a major offensive rather than a defensive stance in Junik. In May 1998, the authorities besieged the town during Battle of Junik, subjecting it to relentless shelling. On August 10, 1998, Shala sustained severe injuries and was taken back to the camp from the frontline. Upon learning of his friend's dire condition, Berisha led a group of soldiers in launching hit-and-run attacks against Yugoslav vehicles in the southern part of Junik.

According to surviving soldiers, Berisha was profoundly affected by Shala’s death. In contrast to his usual conduct in battles, he ceased radio contact with his commanding officer and, along with several soldiers, took shelter in a small house about a hundred meters from Yugoslav positions. From there, they engaged the enemy with sniper and RPG fire.

After hours of intense combat, the Yugoslav forces called in a tank for support. The tank approached the house and fired a projectile, which severed Berisha's right arm and inflicted mortal wounds. Alongside him, Elton Zherka, Përmet Vula, and Bashkim Lekaj also fell. Berisha, severely injured, was taken to the KLA's makeshift headquarters in the center of Junik, where he succumbed to his injuries the same day as Shala. Shortly after their deaths, Junik fell to Yugoslav authorities.

== Legacy ==
Berisha was buried in Junik, but later re-buried in his home town of Graboc, he was granted the military title and rank of Brigadier General by the Kosovo Protection Corps (TMK).

According to witnesses, the Croatian President Franjo Tuđman reportedly mourned the loss of Berisha, claiming he was “a one man army, that Croatia and Kosovo would be eternally proud of”.

Several streets, schools and other institutions carry his name today in Kosovo.

In August 2010, Berisha was posthumously awarded the Hero of Kosovo.

Ivica Pandža, a retired Colonel of the Croatian Army, who had served with Berisha, started investigating Berisha's legacy in 2007. He tracked down Berisha's lost documents in Komarevo that led to the finding of Berisha's Homeland War Memorial Medal in the archives of the Ministry of Defence. In 2013, Berisha was posthumously awarded the Order of the Croatian Cross.
