= Kladari =

Kladari may refer to:

- Kladari, Bosnia and Herzegovina, a village near Doboj
- Kladari, Croatia, a village near Sunja
