= Sagner =

Sagner is a surname. Notable people with the surname include:

- Alan Sagner (1920–2018), American politician and businessman
- Martin Sagner (1932–2019), Croatian actor

== Fictional characters ==
- Captain Ságner from The Good Soldier Švejk
