= Brđani Kosa =

- Village
- Location of Brđani Kosa in Croatia
- Coordinates: 45°22′52″N 16°28′39″E
- Country: Croatia
- Region: Continental Croatia (Banovina)
- County: Sisak-Moslavina
- Municipality: Sunja

Area
  - Total: 5.7 km^{2} (2.2 sq mi)
- Elevation: 141 m (463 ft)

Population (2021)
  - Total: 69
  - Density: 12/km^{2} (31/sq mi)
- Time zone: UTC+1 (CET)
  - Summer (DST): UTC+2 (CEST)
- Postal code: 44211 Blinjski Kut
- Area code: (+385) 44

Brđani Kosa is a village in Croatia, in the municipality of Sunja, Sisak-Moslavina County. It is connected by the D224 highway.

== Demographics ==
According to the 2011 census, the village of Brđani Kosa has 103 inhabitants. This represents 46.19% of its pre-war population according to the 1991 census.

The 1991 census recorded that 85.20% (190/223) of the village population were ethnic Serbs, 5.83% were Yugoslavs (13/223), 3.59% were ethnic Croats (8/223) and 5.38% were of other/unknown ethnic origin (12/223).

Historical population 1857-2011
v

population										219	247	213	210	223	117	103
	1857	1869	1880	1890	1900	1910	1921	1931	1948	1953	1961	1971	1981	1991	2001	2011

Sources: Croatian Bureau of Statistics publications
