= Goran Ostojić =

Serbian and Yugoslav military officer

Lieutenant colonel Goran Ostojić
- Горан Остојић
- Born: 20 January 1962; Bačko Dobro Polje, AP Vojvodina, PR Serbia, FPR Yugoslavia
- Died: 28 July 1998 (aged 36); Junik, AP Kosovo and Metohija, Serbia, FR Yugoslavia
- Military career
- Allegiance: Yugoslavia; FR Yugoslavia
- Rank: Lieutenant colonel
- Unit: 63rd Parachute Brigade
- Conflicts: Croatian War of Independence; Bosnian War: Kosovo War; Battle of Junik †
- Awards

Goran Ostojić (Serbian Cyrillic: Горан Остојић; 20 January 1962 – 28 July 1998) was a Serbian and Yugoslav military officer. He was the chief of staff of the 63rd Parachute Brigade. A veteran of the Yugoslav Wars, he died in combat during the Kosovo War and was posthumously promoted to lieutenant colonel.

== Biography ==
Ostojić was born on 20 January 1962 in Bačko Dobro Polje, AP Vojvodina, PR Serbia, FPR Yugoslavia. At the age of five, he moved with his parents to Jagodina. During his youth, he was attracted to hobbies such as amateur radio and model aircraft. At the age of 14, he became the youngest parachutist in the Aero Club "Naša Krila" and the youngest glider, and soon became a motor plane pilot.

After finishing high school, he entered the Military Academy and chose the infantry major. He finishes the academy with excellent results and was assigned to the 63rd Parachute Brigade. He went through all officer duties, from platoon and company commander to chief of operational service and chief of brigade staff.

During the Yugoslav Wars, he participated in risky operations such as the evacuation of the Cerkalije airport, then in actions in Bihać, Pula, Zemunik near Zadar. His first parachute jump in the Bosnian War was during the capture of the village of Jadar in eastern Bosnia.

He was killed by the Kosovo Liberation Army (KLA) in combat near Junik on 28 July 1998 during the Kosovo War in the Battle of Đocaj and Jasić. He was posthumously promoted to lieutenant colonel. A regular promotion awaited him on unit day that year.

== Legacy ==
Today, the Goran Ostojić Elementary School in Jagodina bears his name, as does a detachment of scouts and a public garage in Niš. In Rekovac, a street bears his name and a bust has been placed in the city park, and there is also a bust in Jagodina in the hall of the elementary school that bears his name.

In his honor, the "Lieutenant Colonel Goran Ostojić" Memorial is held in Jagodina every May, during which parachute jumps, a motorcycle rally with a biker parade and a rock concert are held, wreaths are also laid on his bust in Jagodina and Rekovac.

A memorial tournament in savate and kickboxing is held every year at the Military Academy, and one of the organizers is the Savate club "Goran Ostojić".

== Personal life ==
He was married and had a son. His mother Jovanka was a teacher and in 2013, at the age of 80, she jumped from a plane for the first time with a parachute.
