= Svinica =

Svinica may refer to:

- Svinica, Croatia, a village in Croatia
- Svinica, Košice-okolie District, a village and municipality in Slovakia
- Świnica, a mountain on Polish-Slovak border
