= Gornji Hrastovac =

Coordinates: 45°18′08″N 16°33′04″E

- Village
- Interactive map of Gornji Hrastovac
- Country: Croatia
- County: Sisak-Moslavina County
- Municipality: Majur

Area
  - Total: 11.1 km^{2} (4.3 sq mi)

Population (2021)
  - Total: 85
  - Density: 7.7/km^{2} (20/sq mi)
- Time zone: UTC+1 (CET)
  - Summer (DST): UTC+2 (CEST)

Gornji Hrastovac is a village in Croatia. It is connected by the D224 highway.
