= Drljača =

Origin
- Language: Serbo-Croatian
- Meaning: harrow

Drljača (Serbian Cyrillic: Дрљача) is the Serbo-Croatian word for harrow, and is used as a surname and toponym (Drljača, Croatia). It may refer to:

- Lazar Drljača, Yugoslav painter
- Igor Drljaca, Bosnian-Canadian film director
- Boro Drljača, Serbian singer
- Simo Drljača, Bosnian Serb murderer and criminal, and a war-time commander in Prijedor
- Stefan Drljača, German footballer

At least 279 individuals with the surname died at the Jasenovac concentration camp.
