= Martin Sagner =

Croatian actor (1932–2019)

- Born: 11 August 1932; Novigrad Podravski, Yugoslavia
- Died: 12 November 2019 (aged 87); Zagreb, Croatia
- Occupation: Actor
- Years active: 1961–2004
- Spouse: Zorica Bajgot
- Children: 2
- Awards: Order of Danica Hrvatska

Martin Sagner (11 August 1932 – 12 November 2019) was a Croatian actor, who played many memorable roles in Croatian films, television series and theatre plays during his 43-year career. He is best known for his portrayal of character Dudek in TV series Gruntovčani. In 1955 he graduated from the Academy of Dramatic Art at the University of Zagreb and later became a highly respected member of the Croatian National Theatre, both in Zagreb and in Varaždin. He was also a very good violinist.

Sagner fought in the Croatian War of Independence and was missed by an enemy bullet by about 8 inches at Bobovac. Between 1990 and 1995, Sagner was a member of the Croatian Parliament, having won his seat in both the 1990 and the 1992 Croatian parliamentary elections as a representative of the Croatian Democratic Union which won both of these elections.

== Personal life ==
Sagner was married three times. He died in Zagreb on 12 November 2019 and was survived by his third wife, Zorica Bajgot-Sagner, with whom he had two sons: Fran and Davor (both of whom are handball players).

== Filmography ==
=== Films ===
- Alphabet of Fear (1961)
- Nikoletina Bursać (1964)
- Tonka's Only Love (1965)
- Labyrinth of Death (1965)
- Sonata Facile (1965)
- The Protest (1967)
- The Birch Tree (1967)
- Three Hours for Love (1968)
- Geese that Couldn't Save Rome (1969)
- Accidental Life (1969)
- Yugoslav Working Hours (1969)
- The Happening (1969)
- The Slaughter (1970)
- Discretion Guaranteed (1972)
- The Tambura Players (1982)
- Croatian Story (1991)
- Long, Cold Night (2004)

=== TV Series ===
- The Indestructibles (1990)
- Hockey Players (1986)
- Inspector Vinko (1984)
- The Unconquered City (1982)
- Scenes from Family Life (1979)
- Full Throttle (1978)
- Gruntovčani (1975)
- Where Do Wild Boars Go? (1971)
- Mejaši (1970)
- Depressing Autumn (1969)

=== Theatre ===
- Checkmate (2006)
- East of Eden
- Intrigue and Love
- Much Ado About Nothing
- The Good Soldier Schweik
- The Misunderstanding
- The Spanish Curate
- Uncle Vanya
