= Battle of Junik =

Battle of the Kosovo War

Coordinates: 42°29′N 20°17′E

- Part of the Kosovo War
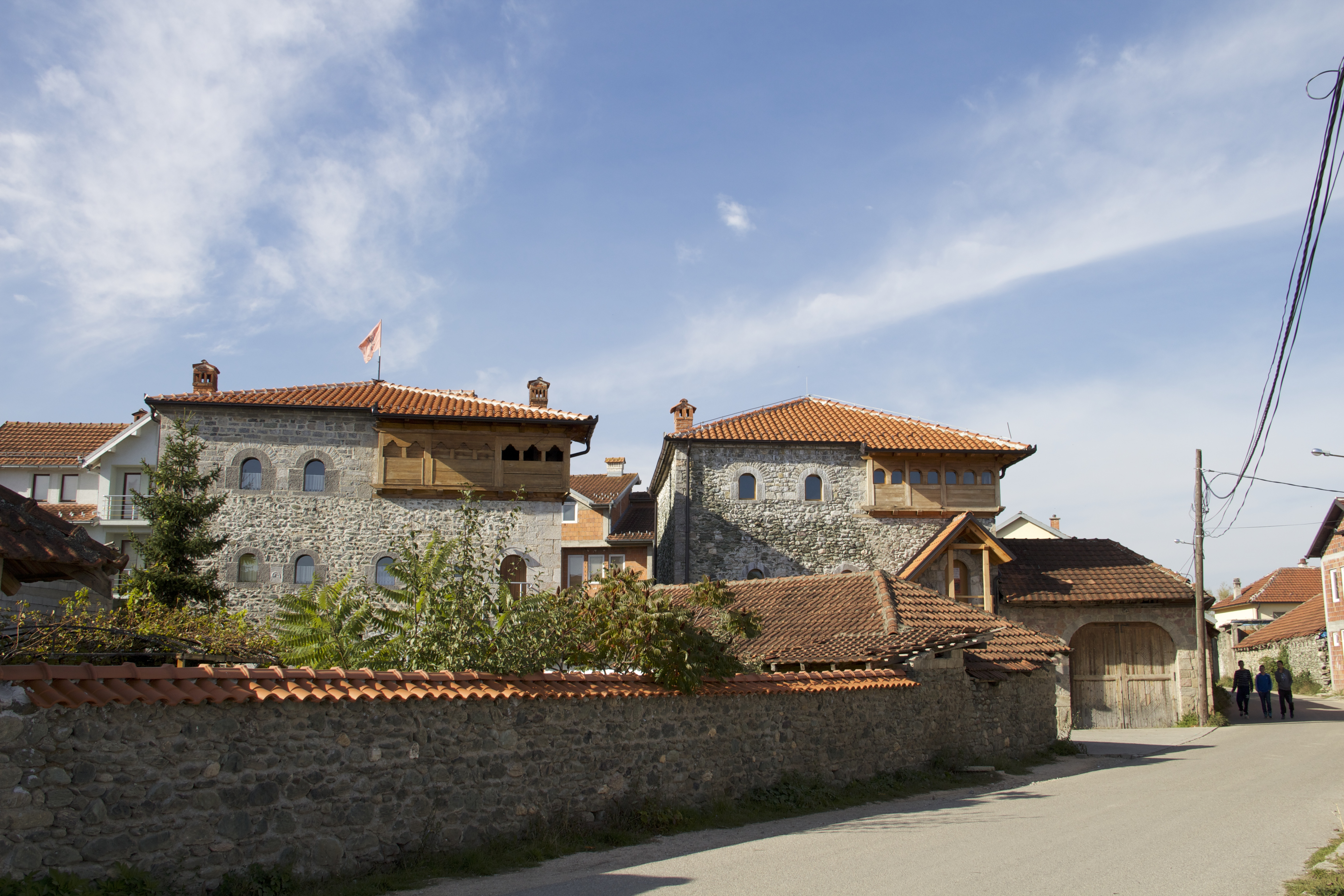
- A Junik street, 2013
Date	29 May – 16 August 1998 (2 months, 2 weeks and 5 days)
Location	Junik, Autonomous Province of Kosovo and Metohija, Federal Republic of Yugoslavia
Result	Yugoslav victory
Territorial changes	Yugoslav government regains control of Junik

Belligerents
(Federal Republic of Yugoslavia) FR Yugoslavia	Kosovo Liberation Army

Commanders and leaders
(Federal Republic of Yugoslavia) Božidar Delić (Federal Republic of Yugoslavia) Sreten Lukić (Federal Republic of Yugoslavia) Milorad Ulemek (Federal Republic of Yugoslavia) Goran Ostojić †	Bekim Berisha †; Bedri Shala †; Elton Zherka †; Përmet Vula †; Samidin Xhezairi-Hoxha (WIA)

Units involved
Yugoslav Army; Serbian Police; Special Anti-Terrorist Unit; Special Operations Unit	Kosovo Liberation Army

Strength
(Federal Republic of Yugoslavia) 2,500–3,000	1,000–1,500

Casualties and losses
(Federal Republic of Yugoslavia) 6 killed	13 killed
- 8 Kosovo Albanian civilians killed, 12,000 displaced

The Battle of Junik (Albanian: Beteja e Junikut; Serbian: Битка за Јуник, Bitka za Junik) was fought during the Kosovo War between the ethnic Albanian paramilitary organization known as the Kosovo Liberation Army (KLA) and the security forces of the Federal Republic of Yugoslavia over the town of Junik in western Kosovo.

Junik was occupied by the KLA early in the war and became a centre of arms smuggling from northern Albania due to its strategic location. The town was besieged by the Yugoslav Army (VJ) and Ministry of Internal Affairs (MUP) on 28 July 1998, and was the site of intense clashes for nearly three weeks afterwards. On 16 August, it was stormed by the Special Anti-Terrorist Unit, the special operations component of the MUP, forcing the remaining KLA fighters to flee into the surrounding hills and forests.

Four MUP personnel and two VJ soldiers were killed in the battle, according to contemporary reports. The KLA suffered 13 fatalities. In addition, there were eight Kosovo Albanian civilian fatalities. An additional 12,000 Kosovo Albanian civilians were displaced. After Junik's fall, the United States expressed concern that government forces had planted landmines around the town. In direct response to the town's capture, the United Nations Security Council passed Resolution 1199 on 23 September 1998, calling for an end to hostilities in Kosovo.

== Background ==
Following World War II, Kosovo was given the status of an autonomous province within the Socialist Republic of Serbia, one of six constitutional republics of the Socialist Federal Republic of Yugoslavia. After the death of Yugoslavia's long-time leader Josip Broz Tito in 1980, Yugoslavia's political system began to unravel. In 1989, Belgrade abolished self-rule in Kosovo, as well as Serbia's other autonomous province, Vojvodina, as part of Serbian President Slobodan Milošević's "anti-bureaucratic revolution". Though inhabited predominantly by ethnic Albanians, Kosovo was of great historical and cultural significance to the Serbs. Alarmed by their dwindling numbers, the province's Serbs began to fear they were being "squeezed out" by the Albanians. As soon as Kosovo's autonomy was abolished, a minority government run by Serbs and Montenegrins was appointed by Milošević to oversee the province, enforced by thousands of heavily armed paramilitaries from Serbia-proper. Albanian culture was systematically repressed and hundreds of thousands of Albanians working in state-owned companies lost their jobs.

In 1996, a group of Albanian nationalists calling themselves the Kosovo Liberation Army (KLA) began attacking the Yugoslav Army (Serbo-Croatian: Vojska Jugoslavije; VJ) and the Serbian Ministry of Internal Affairs (Serbo-Croatian: Ministarstvo unutrašnjih poslova; MUP) in Kosovo. Their goal was to separate the province from the rest of Yugoslavia, which following the separation of Slovenia, Croatia, Macedonia and Bosnia-Herzegovina in 1991–92, became a rump federation made up of Serbia and Montenegro. At first the KLA carried out hit-and-run attacks: 31 in 1996, 55 in 1997, and 66 in January and February 1998 alone. The group quickly gained popularity among young Kosovo Albanians, many of whom favoured a more aggressive approach and rejected the non-violent resistance of politician Ibrahim Rugova. The organization received a significant boost in 1997, when an armed uprising in neighbouring Albania led to thousands of weapons from the Albanian Army's depots being looted. Many of these weapons ended up in the hands of the KLA. The KLA also received substantial funds from its involvement in the drug trade. The group's popularity skyrocketed after the VJ and MUP attacked the compound of KLA leader Adem Jashari in March 1998, killing him, his closest associates and most of his extended family. The attack motivated thousands of young Kosovo Albanians to join the KLA, fueling the albanian uprising that eventually erupted in the spring of 1998.

Junik is a town in western Kosovo, bordering on Deçan to the north and Gjakova to the south. Following World War II, it became a municipality in its own right, but in 1962, it was dissolved and its territory divided between its neighbours. By 1998, Junik was mainly inhabited by Kosovo Albanians. The area was also home to approximately 700 Serbs. Junik was of great strategic importance because it was situated along the Košare valley corridor. This resulted in the town becoming the KLA's main conduit for weapons smuggling and distribution in western Kosovo early in the war. The area's mountainous terrain was also ideal for evading attacks by the VJ and MUP, and as a result, the KLA established its western Kosovo headquarters in the town. Junik was among the first towns caught up in the fighting between Yugoslavia's security forces and the KLA, becoming a flashpoint of the KLA's so-called First Offensive in April 1998. The attack on the Jashari compound prompted the West to re-impose sanctions against Yugoslavia, which had been lifted following the signing of the Dayton Agreement in early 1996. By mid-June, the KLA was claiming to be in control of 40 percent of Kosovo.

== Battle ==
Clashes between the KLA and the Yugoslav authorities in and around Junik commenced on 29 May 1998. By the following month, virtually all of Junik's 7,000 inhabitants were displaced. An additional 5,000 Kosovo Albanians from the surrounding areas who had previously sought shelter in the town were also dislocated. Around this time, the Yugoslav Air Force carried out a number of airstrikes in Junik and its vicinity. The KLA was believed to be in control of approximately 40 percent of Kosovo by this point but was prone to losing newly seized land as quickly as it had acquired it. On 24 June, U.S. diplomat Richard Holbrooke visited Junik and met with KLA fighters there. He proposed declaring a ceasefire and having the warring sides work towards a negotiated settlement, but the KLA rejected the offer.

On 27 July, the VJ ambushed a column of fighters attempting to leave Junik and cross the Albanian–Yugoslav border, killing seven or eight people. The following day, the VJ surrounded the town. Its encirclement coincided with an almost simultaneous offensive that wrested from the KLA a nearby highway that had been held by the insurgents for two months. Before being placed back into operation, the highway had to be cleared of improvised explosive devices. The VJ and MUP gave the insurgents, as well as civilians trapped within the town, one hour to leave Junik via two corridors. But the deadline passed without any response. Around sunset, the security forces and the KLA began exchanging mortar fire. Some contemporary accounts suggest that Junik's encirclement resulted in 1,000 KLA fighters being trapped within the town. Other accounts place the figure around 1,500. The chief-of-staff of the 63rd Parachute Brigade, lieutenant colonel Goran Ostojić, was killed in this operation. Shortly thereafter, Milošević spoke with a delegation of European Union representatives and offered to end the siege in exchange for international sanctions being lifted, but the two side's failed to reach an agreement.

For more than two weeks, the VJ/MUP and the KLA lobbed mortar shells at each other, and exchanged sporadic bursts of gunfire. On 16 August, after a siege lasting nearly 20 days, the VJ and MUP took control of Junik, forcing the insurgents to abandon their weapons and retreat to the surrounding hills and forests. The storming of the town was spearheaded by the Special Anti-Terrorist Unit, the special operations component of the MUP. The assault was accompanied by the extensive use of helicopters and tanks.

== Aftermath ==
At the time of its capture, Junik was the last major KLA stronghold in Kosovo. MUP spokesman Božidar Filić said that with its fall, "the territory of Kosovo has been freed for movement in all directions." The loss of its last major stronghold did not result in the KLA's demise. Instead of completely destroying the organization, the VJ and MUP only forced the KLA to retreat to northern Albania, from where it was able to regroup and resume its insurgency. Nevertheless, the political analyst Corinna Metz notes that the loss of Junik resulted in the KLA losing its of aura of invincibility among the Kosovo Albanian population. According to contemporary reports, four MUP and two VJ personnel were killed in the battle. The Humanitarian Law Center, a Belgrade-based non-governmental organization, lists 13 guerrillas, eight Kosovo Albanian civilians, and two MUP personnel as being killed. Among the dead was the KLA commander in Junik, Bekim Berisha, as well as deputy KLA commanders Bedri Shala, Elton Zherka, and Përmet Vula. Filić said that there had been no civilian casualties because nearly all of the town's inhabitants had left before the battle. BBC News correspondent Jeremy Cooke described Junik's capture as "a major blow to the KLA". Western reporters who visited the town once fighting had stopped reported that the entire civilian population had fled. They found that some buildings had sustained heavy damage but most of the town remained intact.

Albanian Foreign Minister Paskal Milo condemned the town's encirclement and capture as an act of "genocide and mass repression". The Vice-Chancellor and Foreign Minister of Austria, Wolfgang Schuessel, also condemned the assault. Rugova stated that the town's fall would reduce the likelihood of peace negotiations taking place. Adem Demaçi, a prominent Kosovo Albanian activist, said that the offensive "proved there was no alternative to independence for Kosovo." Partly in response to the town's capture, on 17 August 1998, troops from 14 different NATO member states took part in military exercises in Albania, intended as a warning signal to the Yugoslav government. On 20 August, U.S. State Department spokesman James Rubin accused Yugoslavia's security forces of planting anti-personnel mines around Junik. Five days later, the United Nations High Commissioner for Refugees issued a statement confirming that the town's surroundings had been mined. In response to the battle, the United Nations Security Council passed Resolution 1199 on 23 September, calling for an end to hostilities in Kosovo.

== Bibliography ==
- Judah, Tim (2002). Kosovo: War and Revenge. New Haven, Connecticut: Yale University Press. ISBN 978-0-300-09725-2.
- Adam LeBor (2002). Milosevic: A Biography. New York: Yale University Press. ISBN 978-0-300-10317-5.
- Miranda Vickers (1999). The Albanians: A Modern History. New York: I.B.Tauris. ISBN 978-1-86064-541-9.
- Jasminka Udovički; James Ridgeway (2000). Burn This House: The Making and Unmaking of Yugoslavia. Durham, North Carolina: Duke University Press. ISBN 978-0-8223-2590-1.
- Janjić, Dušan (2012). "Kosovo under the Milošević Regime". In Charles W. Ingrao; Thomas A. Emmert (eds.). Confronting the Yugoslav Controversies: A Scholars' Initiative (2nd ed.). West Lafayette, Indiana: Purdue University Press. ISBN 978-1-55753-617-4.
- Sörensen, Jens Stilhoff (2009). State Collapse and Reconstruction in the Periphery: Political Economy, Ethnicity and Development in Yugoslavia, Serbia and Kosovo. New York City: Berghahn Books. ISBN 978-1-84545-560-6.
- Jonsson, Michael (2014). "The Kosovo Conflict: From Humanitarian Intervention to State Capture". In Cornell, Svante; Jonsson, Michael (eds.). Conflict, Crime, and the State in Postcommunist Eurasia. Philadelphia, Pennsylvania: University of Pennsylvania Press. ISBN 978-0-81224-565-3.
- Elsie, Robert (2010). Historical Dictionary of Kosovo (2nd ed.). Lanham, Maryland: Rowman & Littlefield. ISBN 978-0-81087-483-1.
- Pettifer, James; Vickers, Miranda (2007). The Albanian Question: Reshaping the Balkans. New York, New York: I.B. Tauris. ISBN 978-1-86064-974-5.
- "Serbian police spokesman says Kosovo now free of KLA". BBC News. 16 August 1998.
- Bytiçi, Enver (2013). Coercive Diplomacy of NATO in Kosovo. Cambridge, England: Cambridge Scholars Publishing. ISBN 978-1-44387-272-0.
- Erlanger, Steven (10 March 1998). "U.S. and Allies Set Sanctions on Yugoslavia". The New York Times.
- "Kosovar Albanians Mourn Loss Of Architectural Heritage". Radio Free Europe/Radio Liberty. 9 August 1999.
- Krieger, Heike (2001). The Kosovo Conflict and International Law: An Analytical Documentation 1974–1999. Cambridge, England: Cambridge University Press. ISBN 978-0-52180-071-6.
- Dinmore, Guy (25 June 1998). "U.S. Envoy Meets Rebel in Kosovo". Washington Post.
- "Yugoslavia: Serbs Say They Killed Seven Albanians in Kosovo". Radio Free Europe/Radio Liberty. 27 July 1998.
- "Serbs Retake Kosovo Highway From Rebels". Chicago Tribune. 28 July 1998.
- Peter Beaumont (2 August 1998). "Brutal Serb army has destruction of rebels in its sights as Kosovo goes up in flames". The Guardian.
- "Serbs Seize One Rebel Redoubt, Attack Second". Los Angeles Times. 13 August 1998.
- "Serbs Tighten Ring Around Guerrillas In Kosovo". Chicago Tribune. 28 July 1998.
- "Minister Vučević visits family of Lt. Col. Goran Ostojić killed in Košare". mod.rs. 13 April 2024. Archived from the original on 18 April 2025.
- "Despite Milosevic's pledge, new Kosovo village besieged". CNN. 30 July 1998. Archived from the original on 2 May 2018.
- Mertus, Julie (1999). Kosovo: How Myths and Truths Started a War. Los Angeles, California: University of California Press. ISBN 978-0-52021-865-9.
- "Serbs Seize 3 More Kosovo Areas; NATO Begins Drills". Chicago Tribune. 18 August 1998.
- "Svedok: Policija bila na udaru OVK". B92. 17 September 2007.
- "Last KLA stronghold falls to Serbs". BBC News. 16 August 1998.
- "Nato 'warning' over Kosovo". BBC News. 17 August 1998.
- "Serbian Forces in Kosovo Seize Rebel Stronghold". Washington Post. 17 August 1998.
- Metz, Corinna (2012). The Way to Statehood: Can the Kosovo Approach be a Role Model for Palestine?. Vienna, Austria: Wiener Verlag. p. 48. ISBN 978-3-94469-017-9.
- "After 20-day Siege, Serbs Capture Key Rebel Supply Town In Kosovo". Chicago Tribune. 17 August 1998.
- Humanitarian Law Center (30 September 2011). "Human Losses in Kosovo". HLC.
- "Europeans Condemn Attack in Kosovo". The New York Times. 13 August 1998.
- Abrahams, Fred; Ward, Benjamin (2001). Under Orders: War Crimes in Kosovo. New York, New York: Human Rights Watch. p. 47. ISBN 978-1-56432-264-7.
- Pavković, Aleksandar (2000). The Fragmentation of Yugoslavia: Nationalism and War in the Balkans. New York, New York: Springer. ISBN 978-0-23028-584-2.
