= Gruntovčani =

Yugoslav drama TV series

- Genre: Comedy drama
- Created by: Krešo Golik
- Written by: Mladen Kerstner
- Starring: Martin Sagner, Smiljka Bencet, Adela Horvat, Zvonimir Ferenčić, Marija Geml, Mladen Šerment, Marija Aleksić, Eugen Franjković
- Theme music composer: Živan Cvitković
- Opening theme: "Podravina Ravna" by Ladarice
- Ending theme: "Podravina Ravna" by Ladarice
- Country of origin: Yugoslavia
- Original language: Croatian language (Kajkavian dialect)
- No. of seasons: 1
- No. of episodes: 10

Production
- Cinematography: Dragutin Novak
- Running time: 55 minutes

Original release
- Network: Yugoslavian Radio Television (RTV Zagreb)
- Release: 21 September – 23 November 1975

Related
- "Mejaši" (1970)

Gruntovčani (lit. 'People from Gruntovec') is a Yugoslav drama series that originally aired on JRT (RTV Zagreb) between September 21 and November 23, 1975. The story of this TV-series, directed by Krešo Golik and written by Mladen Kerstner, is mainly set in a fictional remote village of Gruntovec, located in Podravina (a cultural region of Croatia), and revolves around a peasant Andrija "Draš" Katalenić nicknamed Dudek (played by Martin Sagner) who lives with his wife Regica (played by Smiljka Bencet) and whose troubles ensue from his honest and naive nature, since his fellow villagers take advantage of him to the greatest extent.

== Synopsis ==
The microcosm of the rural environment of Podravina was filmed by Krešo Golik according to Kerstner's script. Mladen Kerstner invested several years of his life in this scenario, visiting various local village pubs and taking notes of adventures by various “characters” which form the backbone of social life in small Pannonian villages. Gruntovčani introduces viewers to the world of the Podravina village, where stratification conditioned by socio-economic circumstances leads to numerous existential problems of its inhabitants. Credible characters and situations, in which the author Mladen Kerstner delves into the soul of a typical Podravina man, line up with a mild humor, which often conceals bitterness. Ten episodes show ten stories centered on the character of Dudek with his worries stemming from his habitus of a naive, honest, little country man. Dudek has no permanent employment. Here and there he helps the villagers, but always draws a shorter end.

== Background and production ==
=== Filming locations ===
Most of exterior scenes in the series were filmed in the village of Sigetec near Koprivnica, including scenes in which the exteriors and interiors of the show's main characters’ houses appear. Scenes depicting the fictional town of Srednjaki (near Gruntovec) and its railway station were filmed in the town of Ludbreg.

=== Language ===
Despite the fact that the characters in the series speak the Kajkavian dialect (one of the three dialects of Croatian language), the use of the dialect in this series did not hinder the understanding of content by viewers from other parts of Croatia and former Yugoslavia - on the contrary, it enabled a wider audience to experience life stories from other backgrounds. At the same time, these characters are more trusted because they seem to be more convincing when they say their native word.

== Main cast ==
- Martin Sagner as Andrija "Draš" Katalenić – Dudek
- Smiljka Bencet as Regica Katalenić
- Adela Horvat as Maga Helapova – Babica
- Zvonimir Ferenčić as Franc Ožbolt – Cinober
- Marija Geml as Kata Ožbolt
- Mladen Šerment as Imbra Grabarić – Presvetli
- Marija Aleksic as Cila Grabarić
- Eugen Franjković as Martin Škvorc
- Vjera Žagar Nardelli as Greta Škvorc
- Zvonimir Torjanac as Pišta
- Joža Šeb as Čvarkeš
- Rikard Brzeska as Gaber Kuzma
- Nikola Novosel as Tuna Pišpek
- Biserka Alibegović as Franca Pišpek
- Jagoda Antunac as Fika Frkač
- Slavko Brankov as Ivo
- Zoran Pokupec as hairdresser Gašpar
- Dragutin Vrbenski as Blaž Bedenec
- Tomislav Lipljin as Ferči
- Franjo Majetić as Đuro Mikulec – Besni
- Slavica Vučak as Klara Mikulec
- Drago Meštrović as Matula Štuban
- Vanja Drach as Kuzminec
- Antun Nails as inspector
- Ante Vican as man from Dalmatia
- Vinko Lisjak as Laci Bahmec

== Lead characters of the series ==
Andrija “Draš” Katalenić - Dudek, is the central character of the series. The central idea around which the character of Dudek is built is the mythically understood good. He is honest, modest, naive, always ready to help everyone. His attachment to Gruntovec, whom he does not want to leave despite his poor financial situation, is very pronounced. He is not a classic comic character because his development in the series was marked by tragedy.

Regica Katalenić is Dudek's wife. She is a character without particularly prominent flaws or virtues - she is honest, but sometimes ready for a small settlement. She does not inflict injustice on others, but she is always ready to fight for her justice.

Franc Ožbolt – Cinober is Dudek's uncle and first neighbor who lives with his wife, Kata. They are relatively wealthy and Kata supports her husband in everything. Although Dudek is his nephew, Cinober constantly tricks him with his combinations. He is a character ruled by the rigidity of the soul and whose actions are motivated by greed and the pursuit of material goods. However, he finds it difficult to hide it, so his hoaxes, for which he ioften doesn't get punished, are in most cases revealed at the end. However, in addition to material gain, Cinober is very often tormented by envy, especially towards his next-door neighbor Imbra Grabarić. This envy additionally burdens his comic character, so that he often equalizes on the border between the positive and the negative, the comic and the non-comic. Many comic and non-comic situations are built around his envy and greed in which he is gullible, and very often in the desire to earn extra money, he ends up being mocked by others.

At first glance, Imbra Grabarić – Presvetli seems like a respectable and rich peasant master, calm and pious, gentle in manners, though his character is also based on the rigidity of the soul and rests on the vice of greed and insatiable hunger for material goods.

In each episode of the series, the plot gets entangled in the same way - Presvetli and Cinober see an opportunity in which they can either make money or in some way raise their value on the social scale. To achieve these goals, they exploit Dudek who most often finds himself on the path to their success by chance. Sometimes, when they are seeking mutual benefit, Cinober and Presvetli work together. However, in most situations they act against each other because both have essentially the same goal - to get money and reputation in society.

The first episode introduces the viewer to the world of Gruntovec and all the characters together with their basic characteristics. From the very start, Mladen Kerstner divides the good from the evil, the powerful from the powerless, the rich from the poor, the cunning from the honest. He places them within the framework within which they operate, thus enabling the viewer to know in advance how a character will react in a given situation or what was the main motivator of a decision or act. So Dudek will never become a liar or a thief and will never acquire wealth, Cinober and Presvetli will always get rich at the expense of the weak and deceive to gain wealth, innkeeper Martin, president of the local community, will always be respected in the village and Regica will always be hardworking and realistic. Besni will, thanks to his work, be the richest villager and everyone will envy him. In the first dialogues, Kerstner already determines the relationships between the characters, which essentially do not change significantly until the end of the series.

== Contents of the episodes ==
=== Episode 1: "Božja Vola" ===
Dudek, shown walking down the road, eating an apple and holding an umbrella in his hand, is the first character we meet. Behind him, someone riding on a horse-pulled cart full of pumpkins returns from the field. It turned out to be Besni, who will later in the series prove to be the richest and most ambitious villager in Gruntovec. Besni stops and offers Dudek a ride, which he accepts. In their conversation about the fact that Dudek was at the brickyard where he unsuccessfully looked for a job, the viewer gets acquainted with his situation which remains unresolved until the end of the series. Later on, Dudek managed to get a job through the local community - his main task was to break the hail bringing clouds using rockets. He got the job because Regica, after hearing in the village store that the job was open, turned to the president of the local community, Martin Škvorc, who, fearing that the village would accuse him of not wanting to help the "poor", decided to hire Dudek instead of the candidate who first applied and whom Regica called "the richest man in the village." At that time, Dudek was unemployed, temporarily helping Cinober repairing the roof. By not defining the salary Dudek would receive, Cinober took advantage of him - once again calculating that he will cover his debt towards Dudek with a small amount of money that will be enough for Dudek to buy a box of cigarettes.

However, Presvetli gets involved in the whole story by telling Regica in front of Cinober that, in today's world, everyone is just looking at how to exploit the person. Cinober was offended by this and started defending himself by saying that if anyone cares about Draš, it is him. By the way, he always justifies his profit and his bad behavior with the fact that Draš is his family and that everything he does is exclusively for his good. So Dudek really becomes a village rocket launcher but fails to manage his duty well because of helping Cinober at the same time and eventually loses the job. The whole village than start to condemn him because, as they say, the hail destroyed the whole crop because of him. The most effective scene in the whole episode is the one where the storm began to prepare and Cinober doesn't let Dudek off the roof until he's done - despite the whole village gathering on his fence and yelling at Dudek that his place is near the rocket, not on the roof. It shows Dudek's desire to please everyone - at the same time to save the village from hail that will destroy their year-round work, but also his weakness to resist Cinober and his blackmail. In addition, this scene depicts how society is ready to fight the enemy together only if it benefits from it. Those who have vineyards and are afraid for their property, readily unite and decide to shoot from a rocket, while those who have nothing, do not want to participate. Nevertheless, the hail begins to fall at the end of the episode - in the last scene we see Dudek watching how pieces of ice destroy the village.

=== Episode 2: "Jelen" ===
In the second episode, Dudek and Regica suspect that deer is destroying their corn and decide to report the whole situation to the local committee in order to at least get compensation for their damage. Dudek, determined in his plan, goes to Martin Škvorc, who sends him to the hunting association because, according to him, the local committee and the community have nothing to do with the reports of damage from wild animals. After learning from the secretary that the hunter Laci Bahmec is not in his office but at the local animal fair, Dudek goes there to find him. However, there he meets Presvetli who arrived to buy a cow. Presvetli than manipulates Dudek to go and buy a cow with him. At the end of the purchase, Presvetli sends him with a cow to Gruntovec, so Dudek comes home to Regica without doing the job and reporting the damage. In order to secure the evidence, Dudek decided to catch the deer by himself and to prove everyone that he was right. After that, hunter and director of the local agricultural company make a plan according to which they will expose the deer to the bank director's gunpoint – on this way they will please the director who will then approve the credit to the agricultural company. Presvetli and Cinober, of course, decide to involve themselves in the whole story. Presvetli, who always invokes himself on the law, thinks that the deer doesn't belong to the agricultural company but to the hunting association. Cinober, out of spite towards Presvetli, thinks that agricultural company should take the deer. The two of them start to pull Dudek each on their side, while Dudek, at the end of the episode, decides to release the deer.

=== Episode 3: "Babica su Nakanili Hmreti" ===
Due to the lack of children, a decision has been made that the local school in Gruntovec will permanently close its door. On the mutual meeting of all people from Gruntovec, the question of the conversion of the school building arises. Interests are, of course, divided – Cinober has a plan according to which the school building would assign to Pavel Hunjadi who owns a local pub in the nearby town of Srednjaki. In this business, Cinober would take care about the money, while Dudek and Regica would work. This time again, he presented it as a good deed and a favor he does for them. Presvetli, on the other hand, dreams about the cemetery, which does not exist in Gruntovec, so its villagers get buried in the neighboring village of Hrastovec. Local young people, however, want to build a youth home with a soccer playground in the place of old school. Given that nothing was agreed at the meeting, Presvetli and Cinober start fighting for the favor of their fellow villagers and, each for their own purpose, start collecting signatures. The plot arises when Maga Helapova (old lady living in the household of Dudek and Regica) suddenly gets ill and finds herself on the verge of death. At that moment, Cinober and Presvetli forget about their fights and recall that she has a part of the land in the village which is now used by Dudek and Regica but which, according to the papers, actually belongs to them. It turns out that Maga Helapova is also a distant relative of Cinober and Presvetli and, according to the land registry, each of them should get one half of her property after her death. However, since Dudek and Regica take care of her, they are likely to inherit her vineyard. The plot and the conflict is finally resolved on the way that Maga does not die because, as she says, she changed her mind.

=== Episode 4: "Zlatna Jajca" ===
The theme of the fourth episode follows two stories – first one is about envy of the villagers who are jealous of Besni who, in a cooperation with the local agricultural company, raises calvets. He is an ambitious villager who works all day long and now he decided to take and feed several dozen calvets for the good fee, so that the company would later be able to sell them. People from Gruntovec, who appreciate success only when it's their own, organise themselves in a fight against the calvets and decide to call sanitary inspection, hoping it would take them away from Besni. They state that the calvets stink and that, because of them, the quality of life in the village began to decline. Dudek, who didn't notice the smell at all, gets manipulated by Cinober who turns him against Besni, despite the fact that Besni is Dudek's first neighbour with whom he was always in a good relationship. In the same episode, second plot revolves around the theme of naïve art – after Cinober received the telegram that his relative Bara has recently died, he decides to go with Dudek to Virje, in order to express condolences to her husband Štefina. In a discussion, Cinober finds out that Štefina started to engage himself in naive art, a business for which he wasn't aware of until now. He also managed to notice that Štefina earns very well out of that job. After Štefina told him that this kind of job can only be done by a very naive man, Cinober decides to turn his basement into painting studio and to make naive painter out of Dudek. Of course, Dudek didn't manage to paint properly and Cinober's plan ended up in failure. The main message of this episode is that there is no success without a hard work. Because Besni, who worked hard, has now got awarded, while Cinober, who hoped to get to the money on a simple way, failed.

=== Episode 5: "Ovce Idu" ===
In the fifth episode, Dudek accidentally noticed that a flock of sheep is approaching to Gruntovec, trampling the wheat of the locals. After the village got informed about that, everyone concluded that something has to be done. However, one part of the villagers think that the problem about sheep should be left to the police (because no one wants to argue with the shepherds) while the other part think that it's best to wait until they go away by themselves. On the other hand, women, led by Regica, whose wheat has already been trampled, decide to take the initiative and drive them across the Gruntovec border. Very soon all the peasants find themselves in the field and again, those who have an interest in driving sheep participate in it, while others observe. At the end, shepherds decide not to go and set up a tent in order to cross the village border peacefully after dark, when all the villagers will return to their homes. Everyone leaves the field except Cinober, Presvetli and village councilor Matula Štuban who enter into negotiations with the shepherds – they made an agreement according to which they will allow them to pass in exchange for the two lambs, because, according to Cinober, the village forget about everything when roast starts to smell. Cinober, Presvetli and Matula latter agreed that they will divide one lamb among themselves, while the other one will be shared with the people. In the end, everyone is happy and enjoying food at Martin's diner, except Dudek and Regica – of the whole meat, the only parts that were served to them were bones. To make matters worse, all of their wheat got trampled, as Cinober allowed shepherds to pass over their part while making the settlement.

=== Episode 6: "Šćukin Berek" ===
The theme of the sixth episode is the reed for which market demand has increased due to a major shift in the building process. Presvetli, who always know how to choose the right business to deal with, very quickly starts earning large amounts of money, which bothers Cinober, who, provoked by the mockery in Martin's diner, decides to start a reed business himself. He goes to the local agricultural company through which the business has to be done and arranges cooperation. From Dudek and Regica, who are in a very difficult financial situation, he buys a part of the property near the river where a lot of reeds grow. Presvetli than offers Regica twice as much for the same property, because Cinober again offered much less money than the property along the Drava river is worth. However, Regica rejects Presvetli because, knowing that she will probably never get more money for the property from Cinober, she doesn't want to be dishonest and betray the deal. Very soon Presvetli decides to take revenge and forbids Regica to cross the path she always uses when she goes to her vineyard, as the part of the path, according to the land registry, belongs to him. This creates a conflict between them, which suits Cinober because he knows that he now has Dudek and Regica on his side.

=== Episode 7: "Kompanjoni" ===
In the seventh episode, Cinober starts a reed business and offers partnership to Dudek, who accepts this despite the fact that Cinober has not yet paid him the full amount of money for the river property. Dudek works hard on a reed knitting machine and Cinober sometimes gives him money - but so little that he never has anything left. Regica starts threatening Cinober that she will sue him because she is aware that Dudek once again won't get as much money as promised. Meanwhile, the market is becoming saturated with reeds and this business is no longer profitable. In the village, the local board raises the issue of water supply construction. The whole village arrives to the meeting to discuss who will pay for it and how much.

=== Episode 8: "Žufka Čuča" ===
Cooperation with the local agricultural company is no longer profitable, so Presvetli starts trading illegally with dealers and driving reeds from Slavonia – on that way, he benefits from tax evasion. Cinober figured it out and now he wants the same. Angry and jealous, he manages to get a letter addressed to Presvetli in which the reed customer announced his arrival. Since Presvetli was not informed about it, he went to the neighbouring village and did not wait for the customer, so Cinober used the opportunity to devise a plan that included Dudek. They will intercept a potential customer and sell him their reed. The plot takes place when another unknown "urban" man comes to the village and also starts to inquire about reeds. And while Cinober is trying to arrange a deal with one at Martin's diner, the other, whom Dudek took to another village diner, is waiting for Cinober. Meanwhile, Presvetli returns and finds out what Cinober did. After an initial quarrel, they realize they will both profit because one of the customers says he can buy all the goods they have. However, one of them is an inspector who misrepresents himself in order to track down illegal collaborations with private individuals.

=== Episode 9: "Na probi" ===
The ninth episode begins with Dudek's illness, for which he has to go to the hospital. However, he can't afford it and Regica decides to do whatever it takes to get Cinober to pay his debt. She reports him to the president of the local community, Martin Škvorc, because Dudek, as well as other workers that Cinober had when he was selling reeds, was not registered. In the end, however, Cinober agrees to a compromise and promises to settle all debts. Meanwhile, Cinober learns that the old, corrupt warehouseman at the railway station in Srednjaki is retiring and manages to arrange for Dudek to take his place. Cinober is aware that he must have someone in that position if he wants to smuggle something among the reeds. Dudek comes on probation and very quickly proves to be a great worker. Conscientious and honest, he resented his fellow villagers for not allowing undeclared goods to leave the station. Railway station's chief is very satisfied with his work and wants to hire him, but eventually finds out that he can't because this job has already been secured in advance for a railway employee who has little time left until retirement. So in the end Dudek loses his job, and the whole village laughs at him.

=== Episode 10: "Ostajte Ovdje" ===
In the last episode, Dudek and Regica receive the news that Dudek's relative Jozef has married a rich widow in West Germany, from whom he inherited a large and profitable trade, and now invites Dudek to join him. Regica, fearing poverty in old age, persuades Dudek to accept the offer. However, it is difficult for him to leave because he cannot imagine a day without his Gruntovec. Suddenly, everyone becomes very kind to Dudek because they hope that they will also benefit from his departure. At the railway station upon Dudek's departure, Cinober gives Dudek a letter for Jozef – in this letter he persuades Jozef to hire his son, who is a merchant by profession. On the other hand, Presvetli hopes that this mysterious Jozef will pay the construction of the water supply system in Gruntovec, also giving Dudek a letter for him. Dudek, sad and miserable, eventually gets on the train, but already at the first station hops off, resisting everyone and returning to Gruntovec.

== Reception ==
Anthological Gruntovčani is widely considered as the best and most famous product in the history of the former RTV Zagreb and its present-day successor Croatian Radio Television. Although it has been broadcast numerous of times since its premiere in 1975 until today, this ten-episode series achieved excellent ratings with each rerun. Over time, Gruntovčani has earned the name of the cult series characterised with the precise directing, screenwriting elaboration and top achievements of actors – even today, unforgettable characters of Cinober, Presvetli, innkeeper Martin or Besni represent a part of the popular folklore of Podravina, Međimurje and other counties along Drava river.
