= Petrinjci =

Coordinates: 45°22′N 16°31′E

- Village
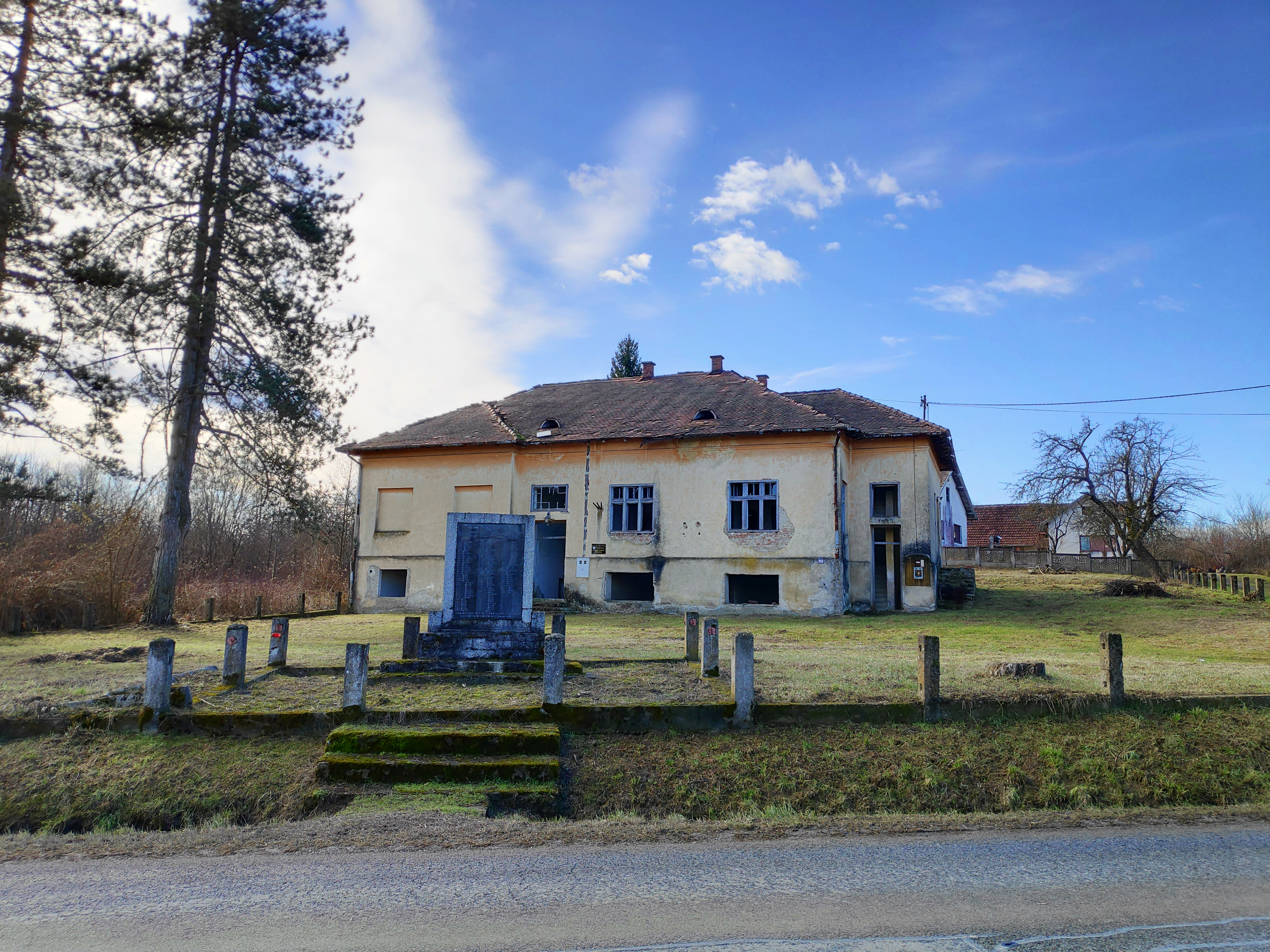
- Interactive map of Petrinjci
- Country: Croatia
- Region: Continental Croatia (Banovina)
- County: Sisak-Moslavina
- Municipality: Sunja

Area
  - Total: 8.8 km^{2} (3.4 sq mi)

Population (2021)
  - Total: 137
  - Density: 16/km^{2} (40/sq mi)
- Time zone: UTC+1 (CET)
  - Summer (DST): UTC+2 (CEST)

Petrinjci is a village in Croatia. It is connected by the D224 highway.
