= Nikola Vujčić (poet) =

Serbian author & poet (born 1956)

Nikola Vujčić (Serbian Cyrillic: Никола Вујчић; born 27 June 1956) is a Serbian author and poet.

== Biography ==
Nikola Vujčić was born in Velika Gradusa near Sisak, former Yugoslavia, now Croatia, and graduated from the Faculty of Philology in Belgrade. He was the editor of the magazine Znak, the editor-in-chief of Književna reč (The Literary Word), the editor of the Literary Youth of Serbia, the editor-in-chief of Vuk's endowment Zadužbina and the editor of the publishing house "Filip Višnjić". He also contributed to many poetry magazines, namely Polja and others.

He is a member of the Serbian PEN Center; he currently resides in Belgrade.

With his poetry, Nikola Vujčić makes a persistent and independent voice of Serbian poetry. Having joined the currents of European poetry, Vujčić persistently writes his poetic matrix, eternally re-examining the medium in which it is realized. In his first book, Vujčić knew how to stick to archetypes, the most important of which is water. Later, only the lyrical subject, language and words remained. Words are seen as decaying objects, and an imperfect language that names them, relativizes everything, creating a void. All that remains is a song woven of decay that falls into nothingness. The poem exists outside the world he sings about and in which it originated.

== Works ==
Poem books:

- The Mysterious Shooter (1980)
- "New Contributions to the Autobiography" (1983)
- Breathing (1988)
- Purgatory (1994)
- "When I was little" (songs for children, 1995)
- Recognition (2002)
- "The Sound of Silence" (2008)
- "New Contributions to the Autobiography" (second, supplemented edition, 2008)
- Bulk Sound (2009)
- "As far as the eye can see" (2010)
- "As far as the eye can see other songs" (2012)
- "Testimony" (2014)
- "Hidden" (2017)
- Books of poems in foreign languages
- Nights and other songs (Noptile si alte poeme), Timisoara, 2011,
- As far as the view reaches (What does the view reach), Skopje, 2013,
- Silence in the Stone (Cisza w kamieniu), Warsaw, 2015,
- As far as the eye can see (As far as the eye can see), Plovdiv, 2013,

Prepared editions:

- Meša Selimović: Krug, novel, 1983,
- Anthology of Serbian folk literature for children, 1997, 2006, 2008,
- Selected works of Grigor Vitez, 2011,

== Awards ==
- Micic Brothers Award, 1993,
- Matica Srpska Dragon Award, 2002,
- Dis Award, 2009,
- Miroslav Antić Award, 2011,
- Đura Jakšić Award, 2011,
- Branko Miljković Award, 2011,
- Zaplanjski Orfej, 2014,
- Kondir Kosovske devojke (2015),
- Skender Kulenović (2015),
- Stevan Pesic (2017),
- Golden Sunflower (2017).

== Sources ==
- Поезија Николе Вујчића, зборник радова, Матица Српска, Нови Сад, 2008. COBISS.SR 230885383
- Како писци пишу / Давид Албахари ... [ет ал.]; приређивач Славиша Лекић. - Београд : Службени гласник, 2006 (Београд : Гласник). - 96 стр. COBISS.SR 133969676
- РТС: Вујчићу награда „Бранко Миљковић“ (13.10.2011), Приступљено 15. 4. 2013.
- „"Златни сунцокрет" Николи Вујчићу”. Блиц. Приступљено 2. 2. 2018.
