= Donji Hrastovac =

Coordinates: 45°19′35″N 16°33′50″E

- Village
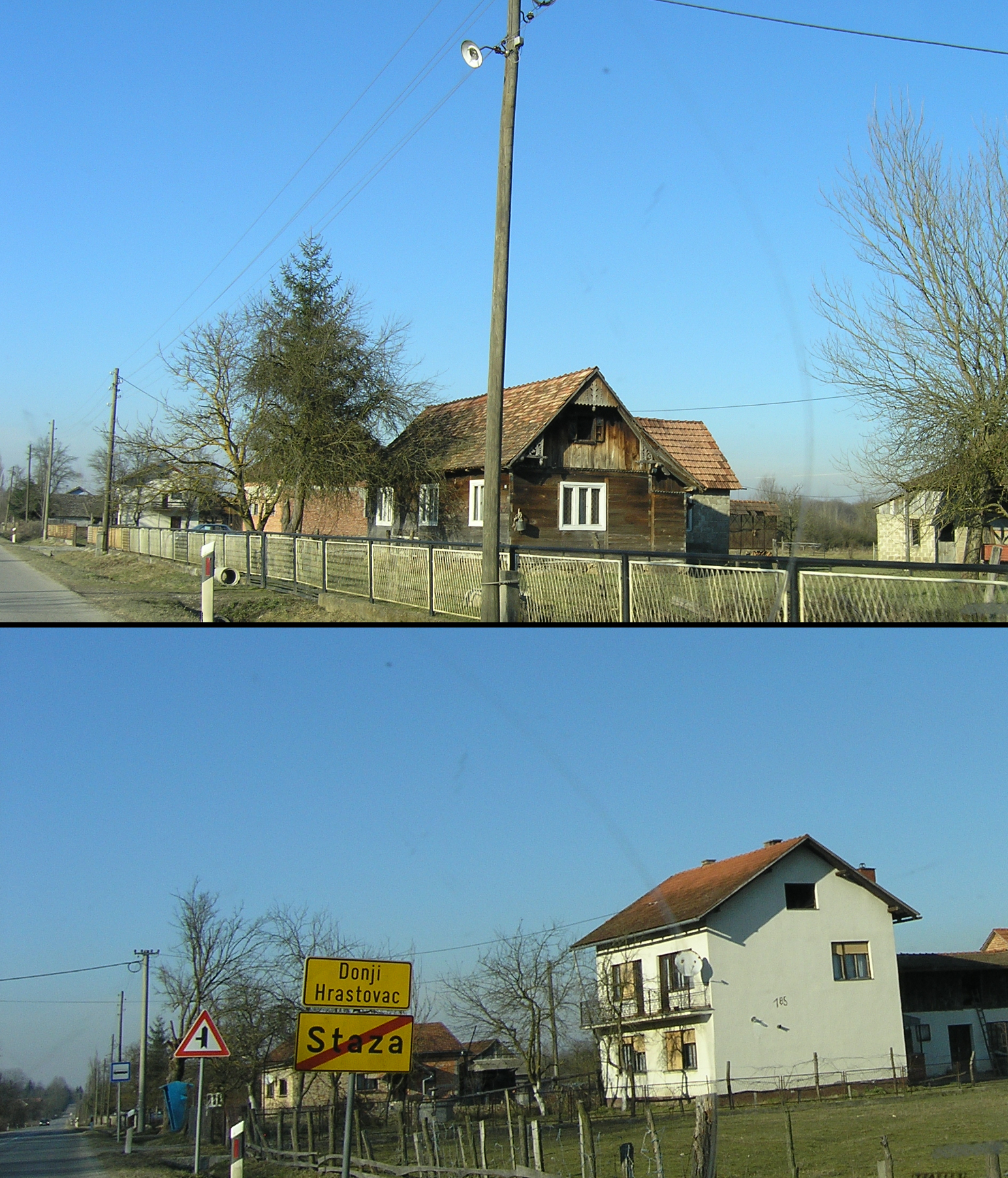
- Streets of Donji Hrastovac
- Interactive map of Donji Hrastovac
- Country: Croatia
- Region: Continental Croatia (Banovina)
- County: Sisak-Moslavina
- Municipality: Sunja

Area
  - Total: 14.0 km^{2} (5.4 sq mi)

Population (2021)
  - Total: 143
  - Density: 10.2/km^{2} (26.5/sq mi)
- Time zone: UTC+1 (CET)
  - Summer (DST): UTC+2 (CEST)

Donji Hrastovac is a village in Croatia. It is connected by the D224 highway.
