= Velika Gradusa =

- Village
- Interactive map of Velika Gradusa
- Location of Velika Gradusa in Croatia
- Coordinates: 45°19′45″N 16°25′27″E
- Country: Croatia
- Region: Continental Croatia (Banovina)
- County: Sisak-Moslavina
- Municipality: Sunja

Area
  - Total: 8.7 km^{2} (3.4 sq mi)
- Elevation: 157 m (515 ft)

Population (2021)
  - Total: 48
  - Density: 5.5/km^{2} (14/sq mi)
- Time zone: UTC+1 (CET)
  - Summer (DST): UTC+2 (CEST)
- Postal code: 44211 Blinjski Kut
- Area code: (+385) 44

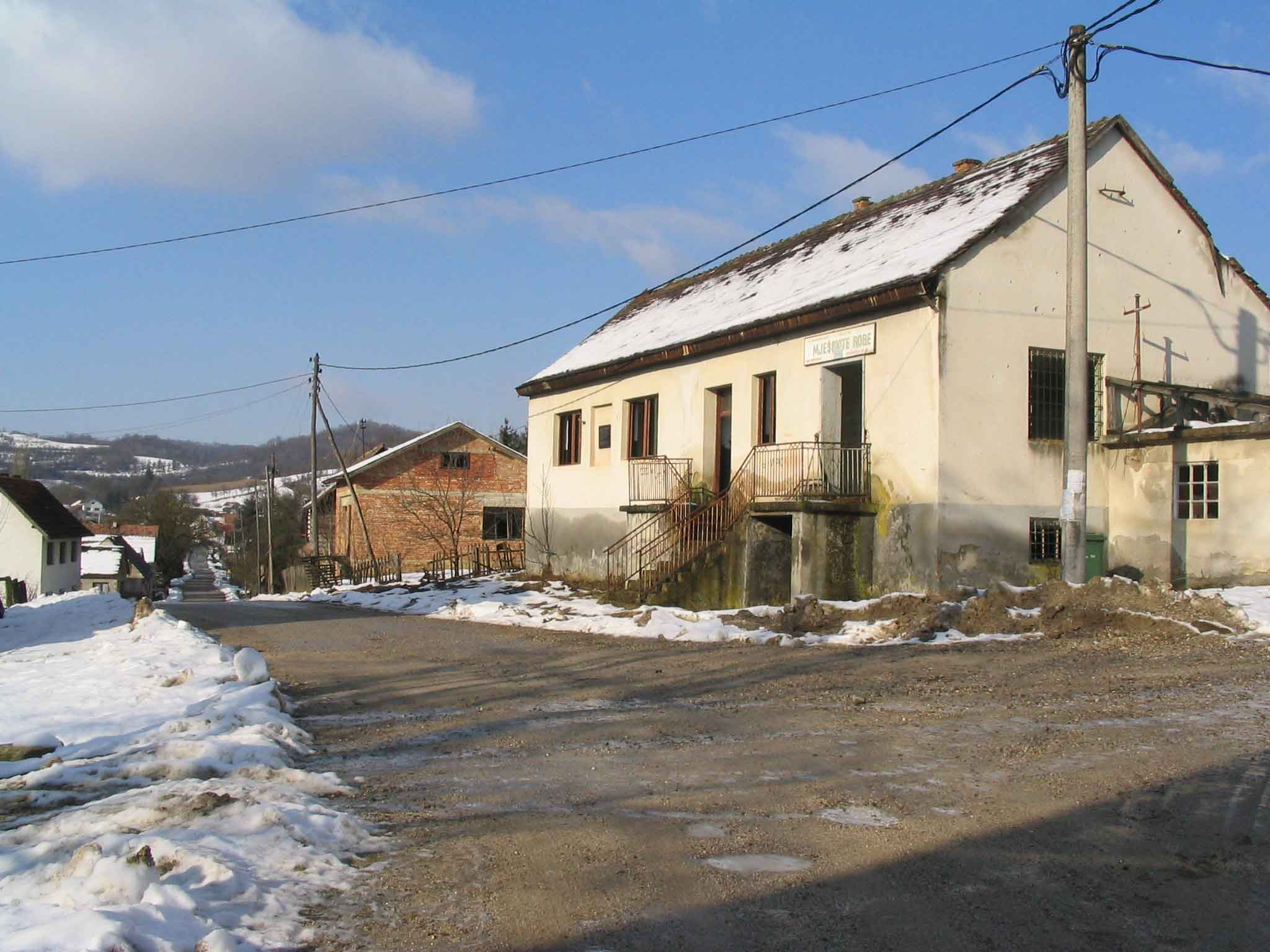

Velika Gradusa is a village in central Croatia, in the municipality of Sunja, Sisak-Moslavina County. It is located in the Banija region.

== Demographics ==
According to the 2011 census, the village of Velika Gradusa has 87 inhabitants. This represents 20.23% of its pre-war population.

According to the 1991 census, 96.28% of the village population were ethnic Serbs (414/430), 1.63% were Yugoslavs (7/430), 0.93% were ethnic Croats (4/430) and 1.16% were of other ethnic origin (5/430).

Population change 1857-2011
v

population	365	402	479	550	653	745	709	772	594	639	600	532	484	430	68	87
	1857	1869	1880	1890	1900	1910	1921	1931	1948	1953	1961	1971	1981	1991	2001	2011

Sources: Croatian Bureau of Statistics publications

== Notable natives and residents ==
- Nikola Vujčić (poet)
