= Graboštani =

Coordinates: 45°17′N 16°33′E

- Village
- Interactive map of Graboštani
- Country: Croatia
- County: Sisak-Moslavina County
- Municipality: Majur

Area
  - Total: 2.5 km^{2} (0.97 sq mi)

Population (2021)
  - Total: 91
  - Density: 36/km^{2} (94/sq mi)
- Time zone: UTC+1 (CET)
  - Summer (DST): UTC+2 (CEST)

Graboštani is a village in Croatia. It is connected by the D224 highway.
