= Brđani Cesta =

- Village
- Location of Brđani Cesta in Croatia
- Coordinates: 45°22′32″N 16°29′20″E
- Country: Croatia
- Region: Continental Croatia (Banovina)
- County: Sisak-Moslavina
- Municipality: Sunja

Area
  - Total: 4.3 km^{2} (1.7 sq mi)
- Elevation: 133 m (436 ft)

Population (2021)
  - Total: 94
  - Density: 22/km^{2} (57/sq mi)
- Time zone: UTC+1 (CET)
  - Summer (DST): UTC+2 (CEST)
- Postal code: 44211 Blinjski Kut
- Area code: (+385) 44

Brđani Cesta is a village in Croatia, in the municipality of Sunja, Sisak-Moslavina County. It is connected by the D224 highway.

== Demographics ==
According to the 2011 census, the village of Brđani Cesta has 135 inhabitants. This represents 44.55% of its pre-war population according to the 1991 census.

The 1991 census recorded that 91.42% (277/303) of the village population were ethnic Serbs, 3.30% were Yugoslavs (10/303), 1.98% were ethnic Croats (6/303) and 3.30% were of other/unknown ethnic origin (10/303).

Historical population 1857-2011
v

population	241	320	343	485	500	600	595	682	548	326	370	359	339	303	249	135
	1857	1869	1880	1890	1900	1910	1921	1931	1948	1953	1961	1971	1981	1991	2001	2011

Sources: Croatian Bureau of Statistics publications

NOTE: From 1957-1971 includes data for Blinjska Greda settlement. From 1981 census on, Blinjska Greda settlement is reported separately.
