= Kinjačka =

- Village
- Location of Kinjačka in Croatia
- Coordinates: 45°23′24″N 16°27′49″E
- Country: Croatia
- Region: Continental Croatia (Banovina)
- County: Sisak-Moslavina
- Municipality: Sunja

Area
  - Total: 7.3 km^{2} (2.8 sq mi)
- Elevation: 133 m (436 ft)

Population (2021)
  - Total: 167
  - Density: 23/km^{2} (59/sq mi)
- Time zone: UTC+1 (CET)
  - Summer (DST): UTC+2 (CEST)
- Postal code: 44211 Blinjski Kut
- Area code: (+385) 44

Kinjačka is a village in central Croatia, in the municipality of Sunja, Sisak-Moslavina County. It is located in the Banija region.

== Demographics ==
According to the 2011 census, the village of Kinjačka has 213 inhabitants. This represents 55.61% of its pre-war population.

According to the 1991 census, 90.34% of the village population were ethnic Serbs (346/383), 2.09% were ethnic Croats (8/383), 5.48% were Yugoslavs (21/383), and 2.09% were of other ethnicity (8/383).

Population change 1857-2011
v

population	182	213	242	312	401	479	464	501	233	280	321	356	365	383	263	213
	1857	1869	1880	1890	1900	1910	1921	1931	1948	1953	1961	1971	1981	1991	2001	2011

Sources: Croatian Bureau of Statistics publications
