= Slovinci =

- Village
- Location of Slovinci in Croatia
- Coordinates: 45°17′08″N 16°38′44″E
- Country: Croatia
- Region: Continental Croatia (Banovina)
- County: Sisak-Moslavina
- Municipality: Sunja

Area
  - Total: 13.2 km^{2} (5.1 sq mi)
- Elevation: 129 m (423 ft)

Population (2021)
  - Total: 116
  - Density: 8.79/km^{2} (22.8/sq mi)
- Time zone: UTC+1 (CET)
  - Summer (DST): UTC+2 (CEST)
- Postal code: 44222 Šaš
- Area code: (+385) 44

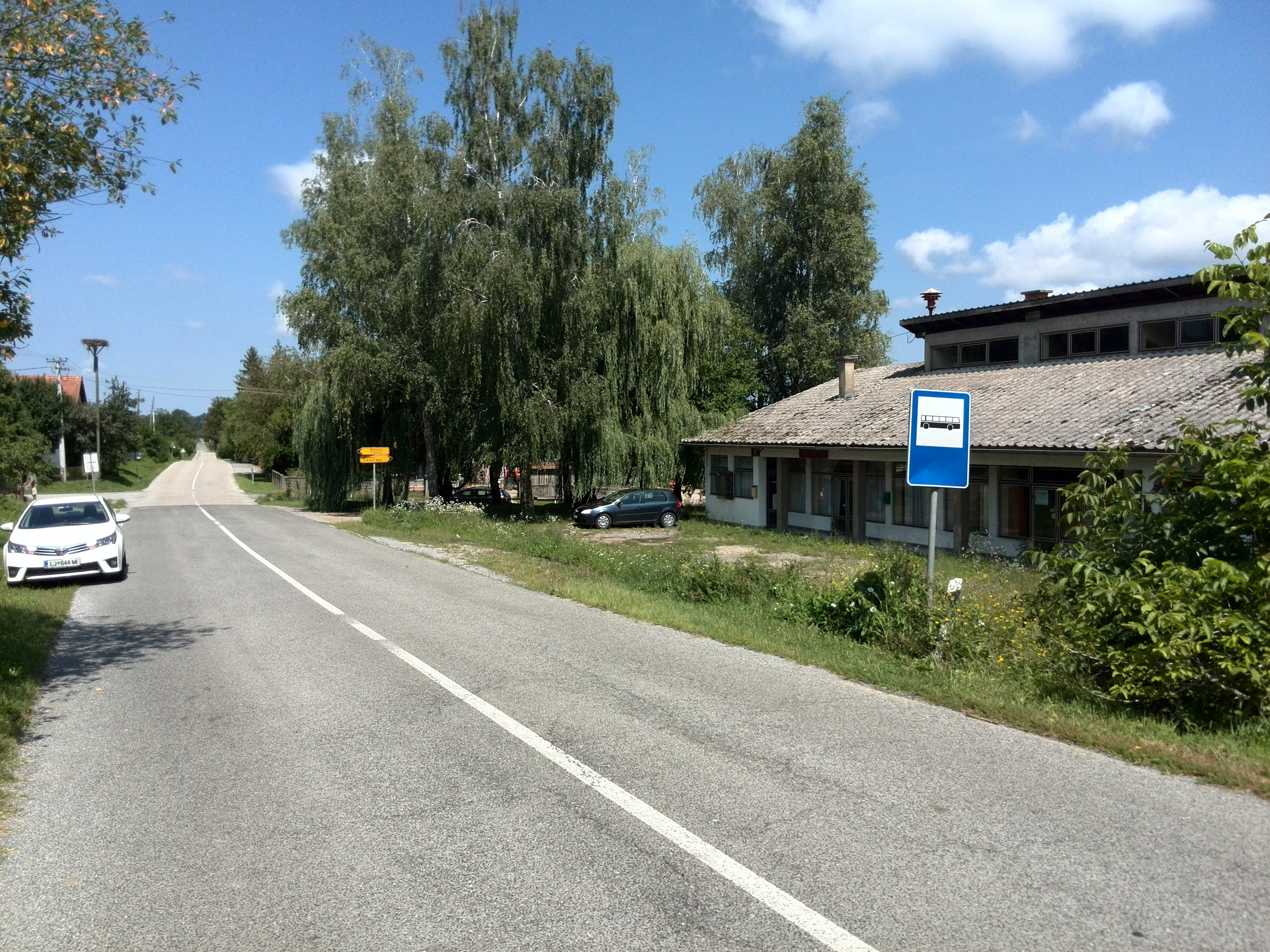

Slovinci is a village in central Croatia, in the municipality of Sunja, Sisak-Moslavina County. It is located in the Banija region.

== Demographics ==
According to the 2011 census, the village of Slovinci has 152 inhabitants. This represents 32.97% of its pre-war population.

According to the 1991 census, 84.82% of the village population were ethnic Serbs (391/461), 7.81% were ethnic Croats (36/461), 0.86% were Yugoslavs (4/461), and 6.51% were of other ethnicity( 30/461).

Population change 1857-2011
v

population	284	271	282	362	449	489	468	512	548	589	577	552	485	461	206	152
	1857	1869	1880	1890	1900	1910	1921	1931	1948	1953	1961	1971	1981	1991	2001	2011

Sources: Croatian Bureau of Statistics publications
