= Ivanjski Bok =

- Village
- Location of Ivanjski Bok in Croatia
- Coordinates: 45°21′14″N 16°44′46″E
- Country: Croatia
- Region: Continental Croatia (Banovina)
- County: Sisak-Moslavina
- Municipality: Sunja

Area
  - Total: 24.9 km^{2} (9.6 sq mi)
- Elevation: 95 m (312 ft)

Population (2021)
  - Total: 11
  - Density: 0.44/km^{2} (1.1/sq mi)
- Time zone: UTC+1 (CET)
  - Summer (DST): UTC+2 (CEST)
- Postal code: 44214 Bobovac
- Area code: (+385) 44

Ivanjski Bok is a village in central Croatia, in the municipality of Sunja, Sisak-Moslavina County. It is located in the Banija region, in the fertile plains on the right bank of the Sava river, to the east of the town of Sunja and some 20 km north-west of village of Jasenovac.

== History ==
The village of Ivanjski Bok was established in the late 17th century by the Orthodox Serb settlers from Podkozarje area in Bosnia. The village became a part of the Military Frontier which, at the time, was expanding onto former Ottoman territories such as Lika, Kordun, Banija and lower Slavonia.

During the World War II, the village was a part of the Nazi-puppet state, the Independent State of Croatia, in the municipality of Crkveni Bok, which comprised the villages of Crkveni Bok, Strmen and Ivanjski Bok. Already in early autumn of 1941, the villages' population was subjected to conversion to the Roman Catholic faith.

The three villages, often referred to as the "Banija Triangle", suffered heavy demographic losses with nearly 30% of its population perishing in the World War II.

== Demographics ==
According to the 2011 census, the village of Ivanjski Bok has 35 inhabitants. This represents 23.81% of its pre-war population.

According to the 1991 census, 91.16% of the village population were ethnic Serbs (134/147).

Population change 1857-2011
v

population	345	429	425	483	577	544	648	514	340	328	303	250	181	147	51	35
	1857	1869	1880	1890	1900	1910	1921	1931	1948	1953	1961	1971	1981	1991	2001	2011

Sources: Croatian Bureau of Statistics publications
