= Vedro Polje, Croatia =

Vedro Polje
- Village
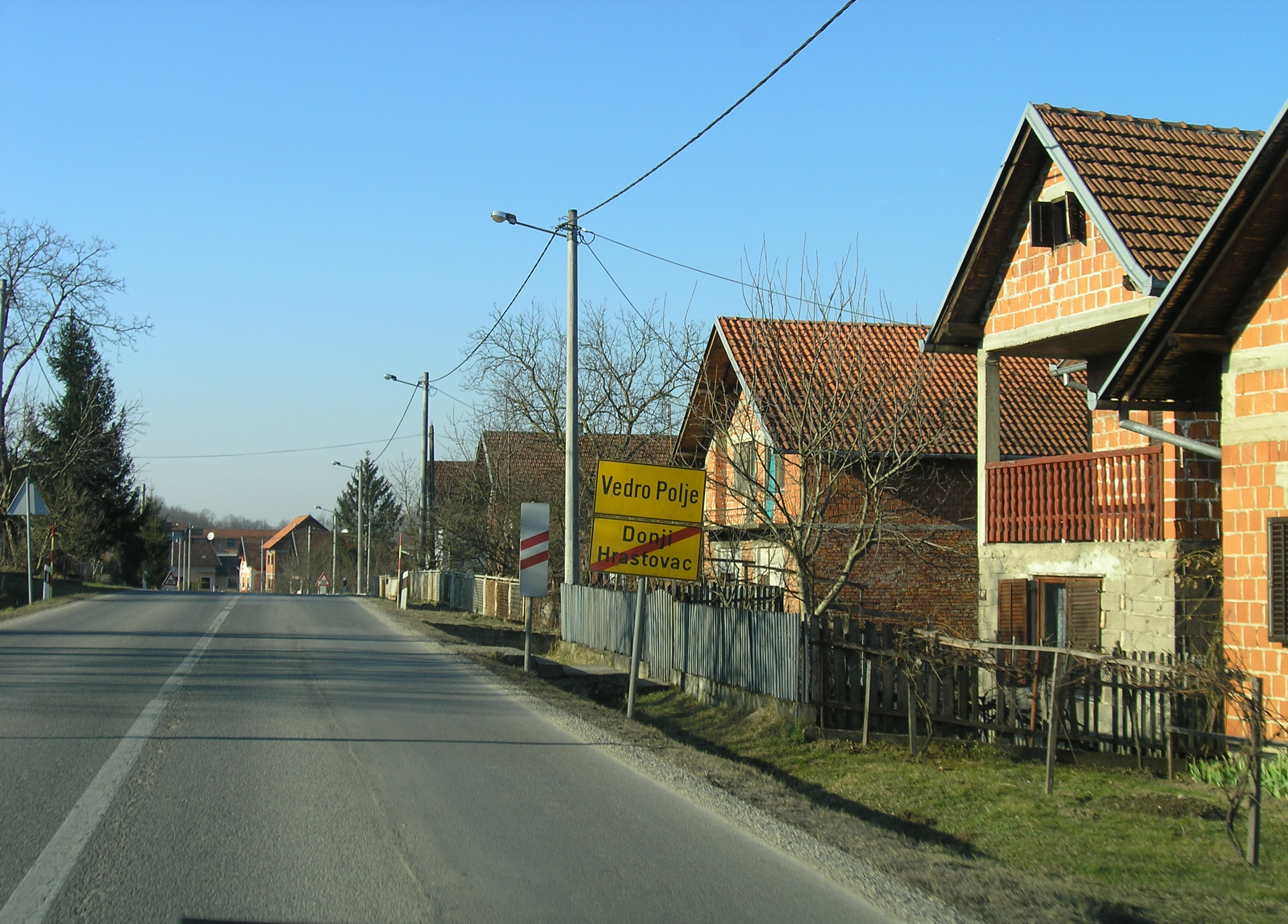
- Street of Vedro Polje Village in Sisak-Moslavina county, Croatia

- Location within Croatia
- Coordinates: 45°20′56″N 16°34′08″E
- Country: Croatia
- Region: Continental Croatia (Banovina)
- County: Sisak-Moslavina
- Municipality: Sunja

Area
  - Total: 0.4 km^{2} (0.15 sq mi)

Population (2021)
  - Total: 95
  - Density: 240/km^{2} (620/sq mi)
- Time zone: UTC+1 (CET)
  - Summer (DST): UTC+2 (CEST)

Vedro Polje is a village in Croatia. It is connected by the D224 highway.
