= Drljača, Croatia =

Village in central Croatia

Drljača
- Village
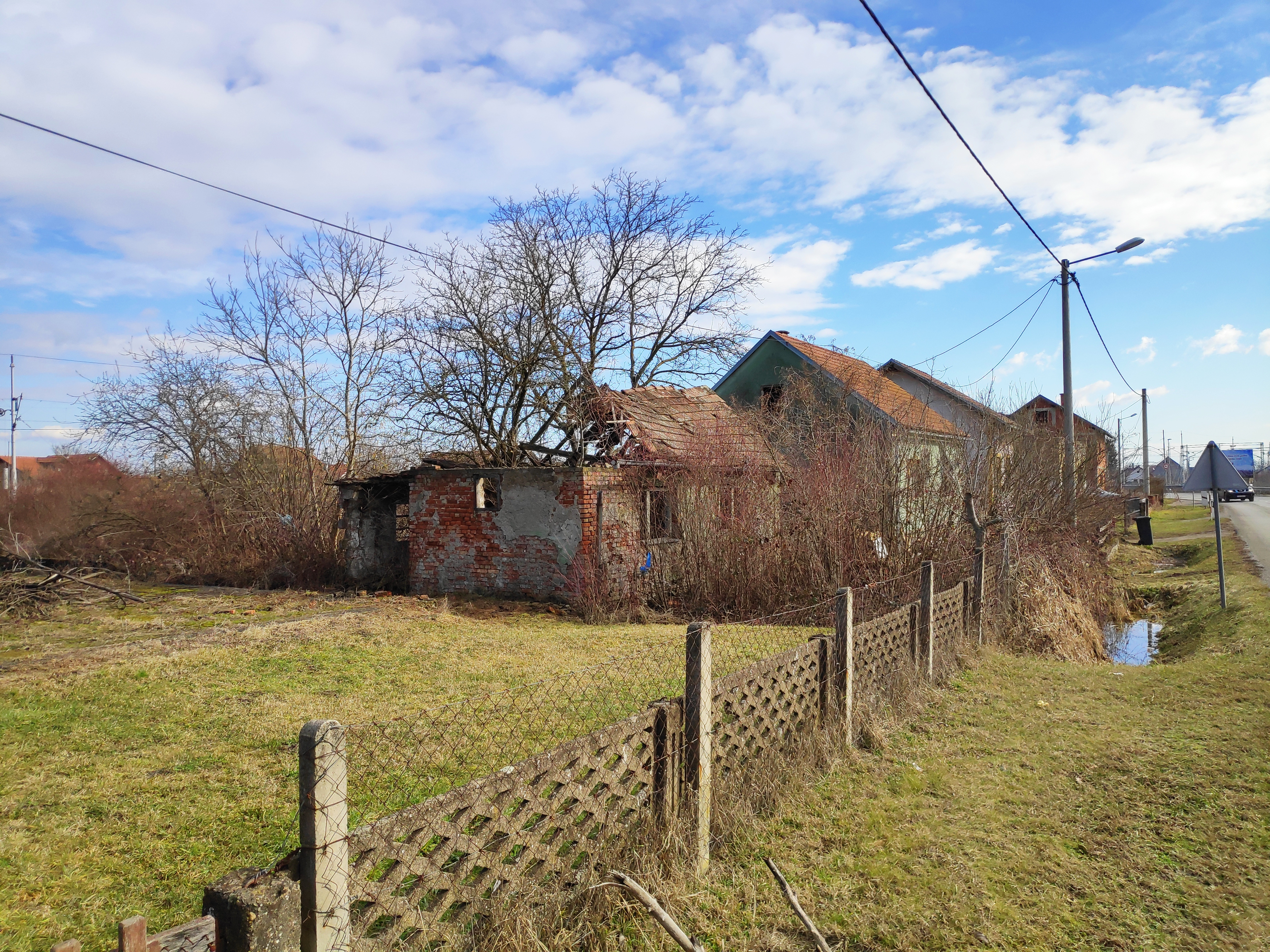
- Drljača with destroyed and abandoned Serbian house

- Location within Croatia
- Coordinates: 45.358352°N 16.519917°E
- Country: Croatia
- Region: Continental Croatia (Banovina)
- County: Sisak-Moslavina
- Municipality: Sunja

Area
  - Total: 6.3 km^{2} (2.4 sq mi)
- Elevation: 133 m (436 ft)

Population (2021)
  - Total: 184
  - Density: 29/km^{2} (76/sq mi)
- Time zone: UTC+1 (CET)
  - Summer (DST): UTC+2 (CEST)
- Postal code: 44210 Sunja
- Area code: (+385) 44

Drljača (Serbian Cyrillic: Дрљача) is a village in the Banija region in central Croatia, in the municipality of Sunja, Sisak-Moslavina County. The village name means "harrow".

== History ==
Prior to the Croatian War, the village was part of the SAO Krajina, a self-proclaimed Serbian autonomous region. During the war, it became part of the Republic of Srpska Krajina.

== Demographics ==
According to the 2011 census, the village of Drljača has 277 inhabitants. This represents 51.49% of its pre-war population.

According to the 1991 census, 77.88% of the village population were ethnic Serbs (419/538), 7.99% were ethnic Croats (43/538), 6.87% were Yugoslavs (37/538), while 7.25% were of other ethnic origin (39/538).

Population change 1857-2011
v

population	257	606		299	350	362	355	763	457	488	574	482	496	538	385	277
	1857	1869	1880	1890	1900	1910	1921	1931	1948	1953	1961	1971	1981	1991	2001	2011

Sources: Croatian Bureau of Statistics publications

NOTE: Data for 1869 include data for the settlement of Četvrtkovac, and 1880 data are included in data for the settlement of Četvrtkovac.
