= Crkveni Bok =

- Village
- Location of Crkveni Bok in Croatia
- Coordinates: 45°20′42″N 16°43′12″E
- Country: Croatia
- Region: Continental Croatia (Banovina)
- County: Sisak-Moslavina
- Municipality: Sunja

Area
  - Total: 7.7 km^{2} (3.0 sq mi)
- Elevation: 92 m (302 ft)

Population (2021)
  - Total: 75
  - Density: 9.7/km^{2} (25/sq mi)
- Time zone: UTC+1 (CET)
  - Summer (DST): UTC+2 (CEST)
- Postal code: 44214 Bobovac
- Area code: (+385) 44

Crkveni Bok is a village in central Croatia, in the municipality of Sunja, Sisak-Moslavina County. It is located in the Banija region, in the fertile plains on the right bank of the Sava river, to the east of the town of Sunja and some 20 km north-west of village of Jasenovac.

== History ==
The village of Crkveni Bok was established in the late 17th century when Orthodox Serbs from Podkozarje area in Bosnia settled there. The village became a part of the Military Frontier which, at the time, was expanding onto former Ottoman territories such as Lika, Kordun, Banija and lower Slavonia.

During the World War II, the village was a part of the Nazi-puppet state, the Independent State of Croatia. At the time, the Crkveni Bok municipality comprised the villages of Crkveni Bok, Strmen and Ivanjski Bok. Already in early autumn of 1941, the villages' population was subjected to conversion to the Roman Catholic faith.

The three villages, often referred to as the "Banija Triangle", suffered heavy demographic losses with nearly 30% of its population perishing in the World War II.

The first massacre was committed on October 13, 1942 by members of the Ustaše Defense Association (UOZ) from Jasenovac, led by Ljubo Miloš, and on that occasion over 90 residents of the municipality of Crkveni Bok were killed, while hundreds were interned in concentration camps in Jasenovac and Sisak. The municipality of Crkveni Bok had an agreement with the German forces on the supply of food, which is why General Edmund Gleise von Horstenau intervened in favor of its imprisoned residents. Most of the inhabitants of the municipality were released from the camp not long after, and the intervention of the German authorities in this case helped to temporarily remove Maks Luburić from his functions in Jasenovac and UOZ.

In mid-October 1943, Crkveni Bok was burned down by members of the 11th SS division "Nordland". During June 1944, there were new incursions by UOZ units into Crkveni Bok, during which 19 residents of the settlement were killed. In these attacks, the Ustashas were assisted by a local Chetnik unit, the so-called Self-defense brigade "Banija". The next massacre took place already on August 22, 1944, and was again committed by the personnel of the Ustasha Defense Association, under the command of Jakov Džal: on this occasion, at least 10 Serbian civilians were killed in the village of Crkveni Bok, while another 70 were killed in the Jasenovac camp after a short internment.

In the first half of September 1944, the UOZ invaded the village once again and killed 8 villagers; on that occasion, the Orthodox church in the village was also demolished. On the same day, a company of the UOZ raids the neighboring majority-Croatian village of Bobovac, where refugees from Crkveni Bok were housed - 24 refugees were interned on this occasion and soon killed in Jasenovac. The last crime against the population of this village took place on December 10, 1944, when over 30 refugees from Crkveni Bok, who found temporary accommodation in those villages, were killed in a UOZ raid on the majority Croatian villages of Žremen and Bistrač.

== Culture ==
The local branch of the Serb Cultural Society of Prosvjeta was established in the village in 1945. In 1971, after the Croatian Spring, all activities of the SKD Prosvjeta were suspended along with the activities of Matica hrvatska. The cultural association in Crkveni Bok was re-established in 1974 under the new name, KUD “Savski lugovi” Crkveni Bok.

== Demographics ==
According to the 2011 census, the village of Crkveni Bok has 117 inhabitants. This represents 28.82% of its pre-war population.

According to the 1991 census, 95.32% of the village population were ethnic Serbs (387/406).

Population change 1857-2011
v

population	551	759	827	956	985	1118	1142	1107	700	756	691	588	513	406	206	117
	1857	1869	1880	1890	1900	1910	1921	1931	1948	1953	1961	1971	1981	1991	2001	2011

Sources: Croatian Bureau of Statistics publications

NOTE: From 1957-1971 includes data for Blinjska Greda settlement. From 1981 census on, Blinjska Greda settlement is reported separately.
