= Staza =

- Village
- Location of Staza in Croatia
- Coordinates: 45°19′30″N 16°35′32″E
- Country: Croatia
- Region: Continental Croatia (Banovina)
- County: Sisak-Moslavina
- Municipality: Sunja

Area
  - Total: 9.5 km^{2} (3.7 sq mi)
- Elevation: 105 m (344 ft)

Population (2021)
  - Total: 170
  - Density: 18/km^{2} (46/sq mi)
- Time zone: UTC+1 (CET)
  - Summer (DST): UTC+2 (CEST)
- Postal code: 44210 Sunja
- Area code: (+385) 44

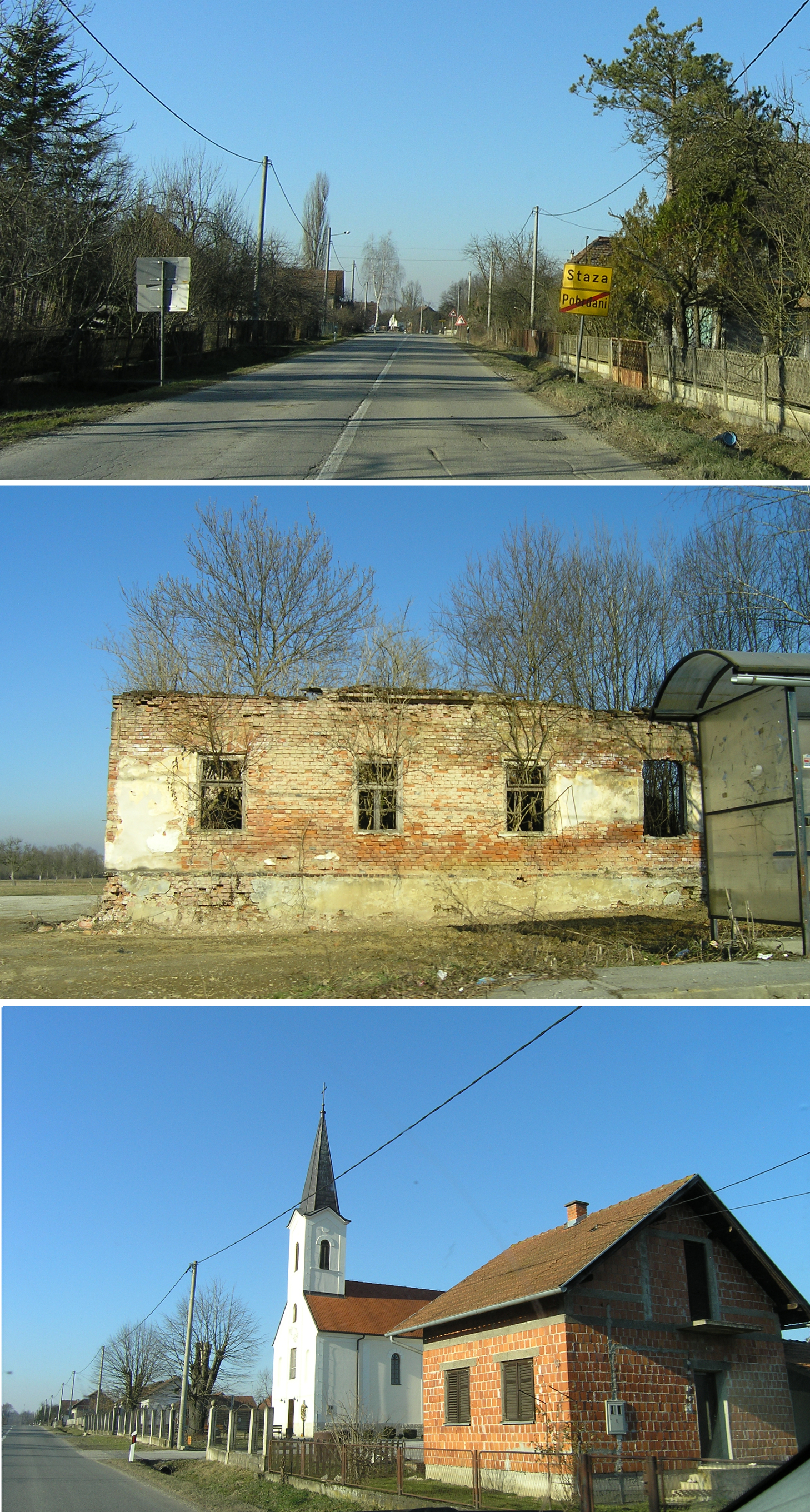
Staza, Sisak-moslovina county, Croatia.

Staza is a village in central Croatia, in the municipality of Sunja, Sisak-Moslavina County. It is located in the Banija region.

== Demographics ==
According to the 2011 census, the village of Staza has 220 inhabitants. This represents 57.89% of its pre-war population. According to the 1991 census, 93.68% of the village population were ethnic Croats (356/380).

Population change 1857-2011
v

population	361	368	400	493	497	523	532	538	563	553	516	467	393	380	304	220
	1857	1869	1880	1890	1900	1910	1921	1931	1948	1953	1961	1971	1981	1991	2001	2011

Sources: Croatian Bureau of Statistics publications

== Notable natives and residents ==
János Damjanich (Serbian: Јован Дамјанић, romanized: Jovan Damjanić; 8 December 1804 – 6 October 1849) was an Austrian military officer who became general of the Hungarian Revolutionary Army in 1848. He is considered a national hero in Hungary.
