= Majur, Sisak-Moslavina County =

Majur
- Municipality
- Općina Majur; Municipality of Majur
- Location of Majur in Croatia
- Coordinates: 45°15′0″N 16°31′48″E
- Country: Croatia
- Region: Central Croatia (Banovina)
- County: Sisak-Moslavina County

Area
  - Municipality: 67.4 km^{2} (26.0 sq mi)
  - Urban: 4.8 km^{2} (1.9 sq mi)
- Elevation: 160 m (520 ft)

Population (2021)
  - Municipality: 760
  - Density: 11/km^{2} (29/sq mi)
  - Urban: 272
  - Urban density: 57/km^{2} (150/sq mi)
- Time zone: UTC+1 (CET)
  - Summer (DST): UTC+2 (CEST)
- Area code: (+385) 044
- Website: opcina-majur.hr

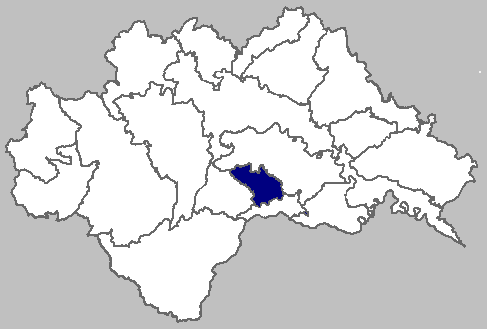
Image of Majur municipality within Sisak-Moslavina County

Majur is a settlement and a municipality in central Croatia in the Sisak-Moslavina County. It has a population of 1,185, 70.04% of whom are Croats (2011 census) and 27.26% are ethnic Serbs.

By census 1991 Serbs were a majority 1,381 (54.05%), followed by Croats 1,036 (40.54%), Yugoslavs 72 (2.81%) and others 66 (2.58%). Majur is underdeveloped municipality which is statistically classified as the First Category Area of Special State Concern by the Government of Croatia.

== Demographics ==
=== Settlements ===
The municipality consists of 11 settlements:

- Gornja Meminska, population 17
- Gornji Hrastovac, population 209
- Graboštani, population 134
- Kostrići, population 3
- Majur, population 324
- Malo Krčevo, population 19
- Mračaj, population 42
- Srednja Meminska, population 58
- Stubalj, population 186
- Svinica, population 114
- Veliko Krčevo, population 79

== Politics ==
=== Minority councils and representatives ===
Directly elected minority councils and representatives are tasked with consulting tasks for the local or regional authorities in which they are advocating for minority rights and interests, integration into public life and participation in the management of local affairs. At the 2023 Croatian national minorities councils and representatives elections Serbs of Croatia fulfilled legal requirements to elect 10 members minority council of the Municipality of Majur.

== Notable natives and residents ==
- Grigorije Živković, born in Meminska
