= Šaš =

- Village
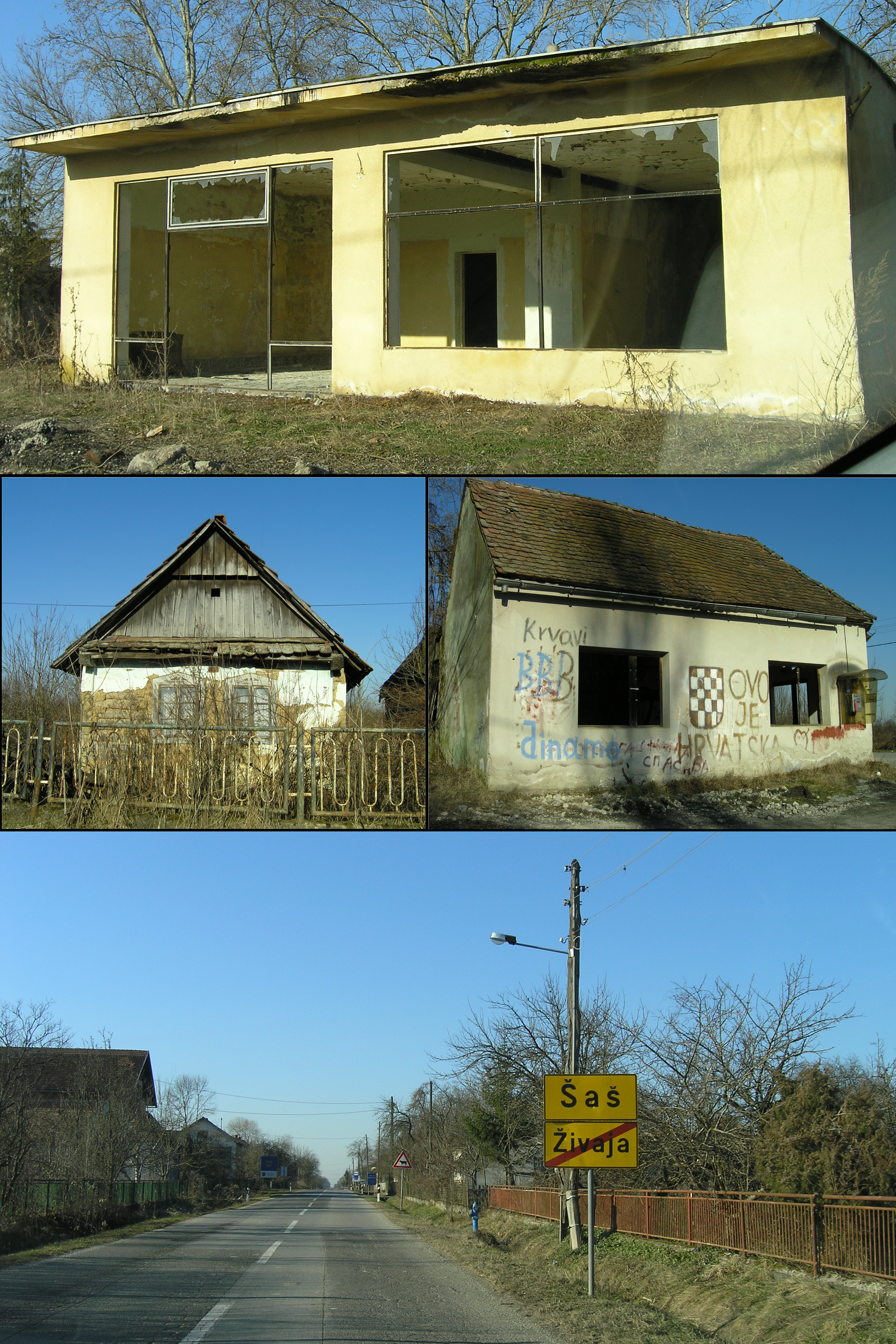

- Location of Šaš in Croatia
- Coordinates: 45°16′19″N 16°40′48″E
- Country: Croatia
- Region: Continental Croatia (Banovina)
- County: Sisak-Moslavina
- Municipality: Sunja

Area
  - Total: 32.1 km^{2} (12.4 sq mi)
- Elevation: 100 m (330 ft)

Population (2021)
  - Total: 168
  - Density: 5.23/km^{2} (13.6/sq mi)
- Time zone: UTC+1 (CET)
  - Summer (DST): UTC+2 (CEST)
- Postal code: 44222 Šaš
- Area code: (+385) 44

Šaš is a village in central Croatia, in the municipality of Sunja, Sisak-Moslavina County. It is located in the Banija region.

== Demographics ==
According to the 2011 census, the village of Šaš has 307 inhabitants. This represents 41.77% of its pre-war population.

The 1991 census recorded that 81.77% of the village population were ethnic Serbs (601/735), 10.75% were ethnic Croats (79/735), 5.44% were Yugoslavs (40/735) while 2.04% were of other ethnicity (15/735).

Historical population 1857-2011
v

population	516	537	581	634	837	958	939	1003	949	973	961	849	807	735	394	307
	1857	1869	1880	1890	1900	1910	1921	1931	1948	1953	1961	1971	1981	1991	2001	2011

Sources: Croatian Bureau of Statistics publications
