= Bestrma =

- Village
- Location of Bestrma in Croatia
- Coordinates: 45°23′21″N 16°26′39″E
- Country: Croatia
- Region: Continental Croatia (Banovina)
- County: Sisak-Moslavina
- Municipality: Sunja

Area
  - Total: 6.1 km^{2} (2.4 sq mi)
- Elevation: 136 m (446 ft)

Population (2021)
  - Total: 71
  - Density: 12/km^{2} (30/sq mi)
- Time zone: UTC+1 (CET)
  - Summer (DST): UTC+2 (CEST)
- Postal code: 44211 Blinjski Kut
- Area code: (+385) 44

Bestrma is a village in central Croatia, in the municipality of Sunja, Sisak-Moslavina County. It is located in the Banija region.

== Demographics ==
According to the 2011 census, the village of Bestrma has 86 inhabitants. This represents 29.66% of its pre-war population according to the 1991 census.

The 1991 census recorded that 81.38% (236/290) of the village population were ethnic Serbs, 12.76% were Yugoslavs (37/290), 2.07% were Croats (6/290) and 3.79% were of other/unknown ethnic origin (11/290).

Historical population 1857-2011
v

population	255	324	415	487	580	650	650	699	413	471	479	471	343	290	166	86
	1857	1869	1880	1890	1900	1910	1921	1931	1948	1953	1961	1971	1981	1991	2001	2011

Sources: Croatian Bureau of Statistics publications

NOTE: From 1957-1971 includes data for Blinjska Greda settlement. From 1981 census on, Blinjska Greda settlement is reported separately.
