= Sunja, Croatia =

Sunja
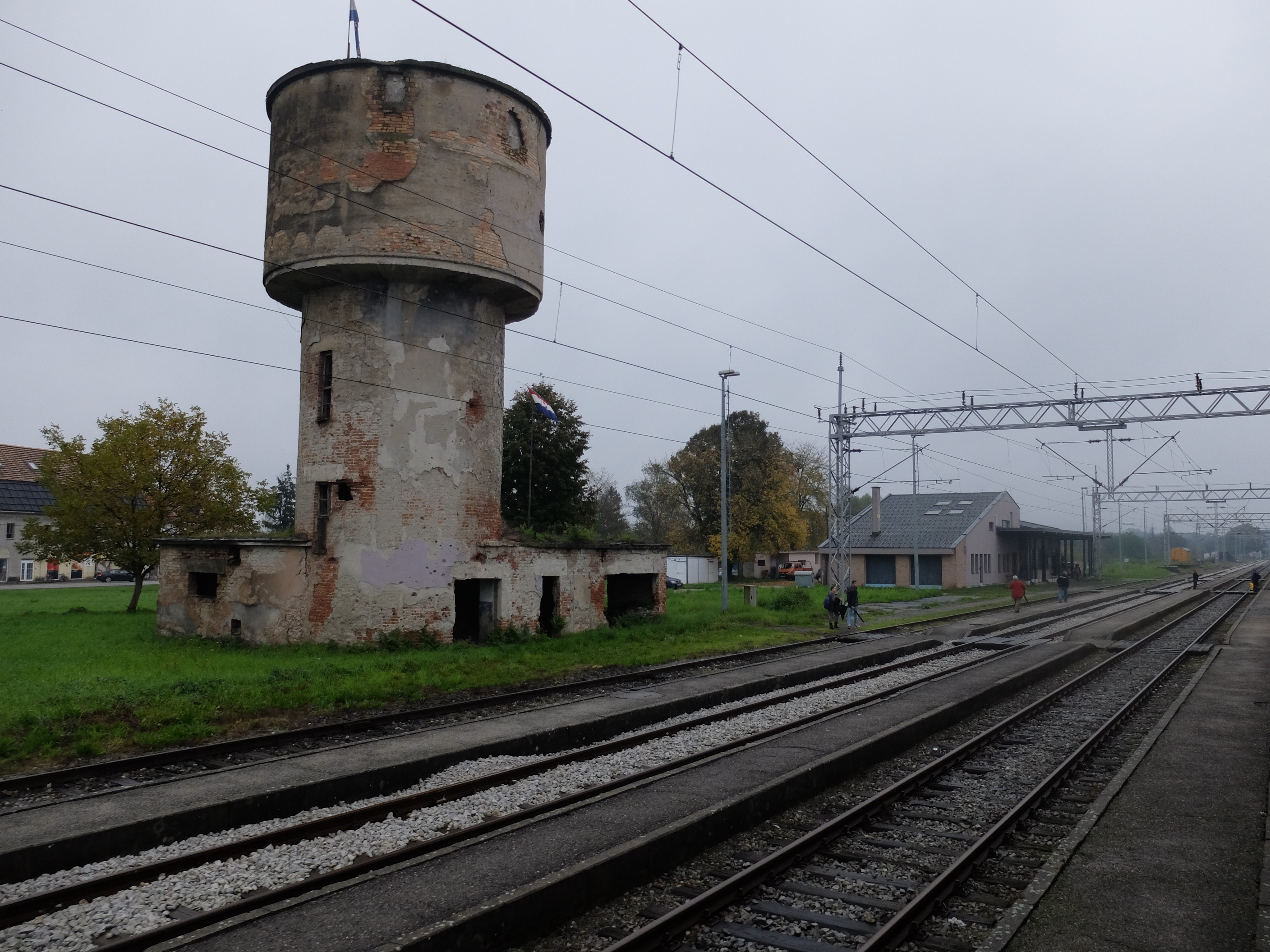
- Sunja Railway station

- Location of Sunja in Croatia
- Coordinates: 45°22′N 16°34′E
- Country: Croatia
- Region: Central Croatia (Banovina)
- County: Sisak-Moslavina County

Area
  - City: 288.3 km^{2} (111.3 sq mi)
  - Urban: 13.3 km^{2} (5.1 sq mi)

Population (2021)
  - City: 4,124
  - Density: 14.30/km^{2} (37.05/sq mi)
  - Urban: 1,170
  - Urban density: 88.0/km^{2} (228/sq mi)
- Website: sunja.hr

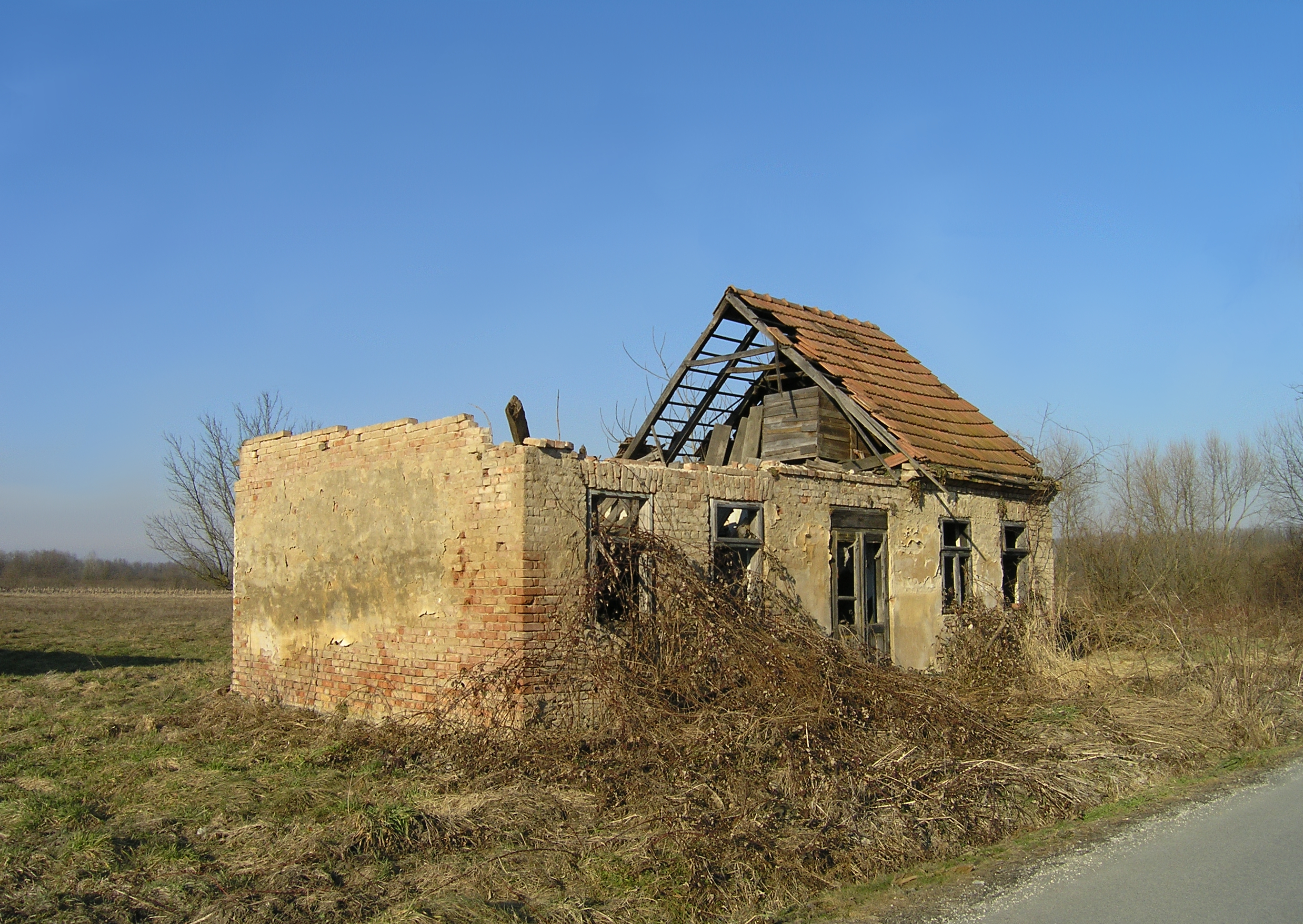
House Destroyed during the Croatian War of Independence

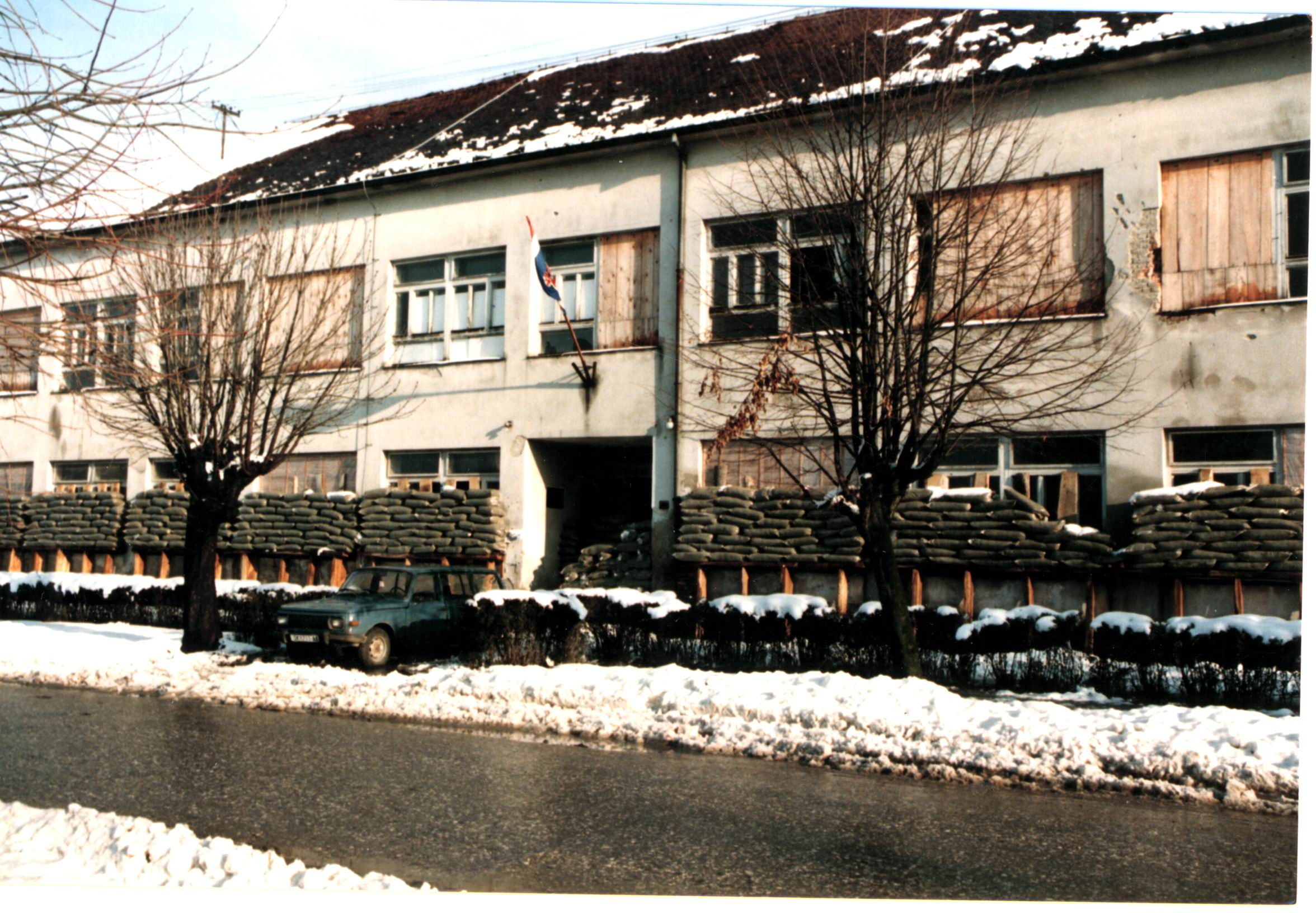
Sunja Croatia 1995. Released in Public Domain thanks to Osservatorio Balcani e Caucaso's "Cercavamo la pace" crowd-sourcing project

Sunja is a village and a municipality in the Sisak-Moslavina County of Croatia.

== Climate ==
Since records began in 1981, the highest temperature recorded at the local weather station was 40.2 °C (104.4 °F), on 18 July 2007. The coldest temperature was −26.5 °C (−15.7 °F), on 12 January 1985.

== Population ==
The municipality has a total population of 5,748 (census 2011), in the following settlements:

- Bestrma, population 86
- Bistrač, population 40
- Blinjska Greda, population 35
- Bobovac, population 330
- Brđani Cesta, population 135
- Brđani Kosa, population 103
- Crkveni Bok, population 117
- Čapljani, population 37
- Četvrtkovac, population 232
- Donja Letina, population 30
- Donji Hrastovac, population 217
- Drljača, population 277
- Gornja Letina, population 71
- Gradusa Posavska, population 89
- Greda Sunjska, population 366
- Ivanjski Bok, population 35
- Jasenovčani, population 41
- Kinjačka, population 213
- Kladari, population 7
- Kostreši Šaški, population 71
- Krivaj Sunjski, population 120
- Mala Gradusa, population 20
- Mala Paukova, population 39
- Novoselci, population 38
- Papići, population 56
- Petrinjci, population 183
- Pobrđani, population 22
- Radonja Luka, population 31
- Selišće Sunjsko, population 37
- Sjeverovac, population 33
- Slovinci, population 152
- Staza, population 220
- Strmen, population 135
- Sunja, population 1,412
- Šaš, population 307
- Timarci, population 119
- Vedro Polje, population 119
- Velika Gradusa, population 87
- Vukoševac, population 21
- Žreme, population 65

In the 2011 census, there were 4,264 (74.18%) Croats and 1,280 (22.27%) Serbs.

== Politics ==
=== Minority councils and representatives ===
Directly elected minority councils and representatives are tasked with consulting tasks for the local or regional authorities in which they are advocating for minority rights and interests, integration into public life and participation in the management of local affairs. At the 2023 Croatian national minorities councils and representatives elections Serbs of Croatia fulfilled legal requirements to elect 10 members minority council of the Municipality of Sunja.

== History ==
People lived in the area between the Sava and Sunja rivers even in prehistoric times. This is proven by the archaeological site on the hill called Pleće, where the remains of a former fishing settlement and pottery fragments were found. In the 4th century BC, Celts belonging to the "Segestani" tribe broke into the territory inhabited by the Illyrians. They founded the most important city in the region, Segestica, located northwest of here. The city was conquered by the Roman army led by Octavian in the i. e. He occupied it between 35 BC and 33 BC in his campaign against the Iapodes of the Eastern Alps during his conquest of Illyria. He then established a military camp opposite the Celtic city on the left bank of Kulpa, which he named Siscia. Two important Roman roads led from Siscia through the area of today's Sunja, one led to what was then Sirmium, the other to Salona.

The Slavs arrived in this region in the 7th century during Avar era. After demise of Avar rule, March of Pannonia was founded. After demise of this march, it was initially ruled by Franks. It was finally part of Kingdom of Croatia. After Coloman defeating Petar Snačić, the last Croatian king, Croatia entered a personal union with Kingdom of Hungary according to Pacta convent in 1102.

Sunja was conquered by Ottomans along with Kostajnica in 1556. The population fled from the constant fighting to the safer Western Hungary, mainly to the area of today's Burgenland, others were captured by the Turks. During Turkish rule Sunja was part of Greda nahiya in Bosnia Eyalet. Turkish rule lasted till Austrian conquest in 1687. It was part of Military Frontier till 1881 except French rule as part of Illyrian Provinces between 1809 and 1814.

In the late 19th and early 20th century, Sunja was part of the Zagreb County of the Kingdom of Croatia-Slavonia.
