= Svinica, Croatia =

Svinica
- Village
- Location in Croatia
- Coordinates: 45°18′21″N 16°29′38″E
- Country: Croatia
- County: Sisak-Moslavina
- Municipality: Majur

Area
  - Total: 21.9 km^{2} (8.5 sq mi)

Population (2021)
  - Total: 63
  - Density: 2.9/km^{2} (7.5/sq mi)
- Time zone: UTC+1 (Central European Time)

Svinica is a village in central Croatia located about 7 km north of Hrvatska Kostajnica.

== History ==
The exact date of the first settlement is unknown, but during the 15th and 16th century, documents show the existence of a fort built as a protection against the invading Turks.

After the war in Croatia (1991-1995), many residents fled the village to find refuge in safer areas.

== Geography ==
The village sits along Svinica Creek that starts from the spring in the upper part of the village. On the way, downstream creek powers about dozen watermills that were used to ground crops such as corn and wheat. The village is positioned in the area next to the old Roman roads, but there is no existing proof of settlement being there during this period.

There are two Serbian Orthodox Churches in the village; Serbian Orthodox Church of St. Jovan and Serbian Orthodox Church of St. Petka.

== Economy ==
The chief occupations are farming, forestry, and hunting which gives the people of village their livelihood.
