= Gornja Letina =

Coordinates: 45°24′N 16°34′E

- Village
- Interactive map of Gornja Letina
- Country: Croatia
- Region: Continental Croatia (Banovina)
- County: Sisak-Moslavina
- Municipality: Sunja

Area
  - Total: 1.7 km^{2} (0.66 sq mi)

Population (2021)
  - Total: 54
  - Density: 32/km^{2} (82/sq mi)
- Time zone: UTC+1 (CET)
  - Summer (DST): UTC+2 (CEST)

Gornja Letina is a village in Croatia.
