= Kladari, Croatia =

Settlement in Sisak-Moslavina County, Croatia

Kladari
- Settlement
- Interactive map of Kladari
- Location of Kladari in Croatia
- Coordinates: 45°20′38″N 16°27′29″E
- Country: Croatia
- County: Sisak-Moslavina
- Municipality: Sunja

Area
  - Total: 3.9 km^{2} (1.5 sq mi)

Population (2021)
  - Total: 1
  - Density: 0.26/km^{2} (0.66/sq mi)
- Time zone: UTC+1 (CET)
  - Summer (DST): UTC+2 (CEST)
- Postal code: 44210 Sunja
- Area code: +385 (0)44

Kladari is a settlement in the Municipality of Sunja in Croatia. In 2021, its population was 1.

== Demographics ==
Kladari: Population trends 1857–2021
v

population				111	142				117	116	106	92	80	63	32	7	1
	1857	1869	1880	1890	1900	1910	1921	1931	1948	1953	1961	1971	1981	1991	2001	2011	2021

Sources: Croatian Bureau of Statistics publications
