= Bobovac, Croatia =

Bobovac
- Village
- Location of Bobovac in Croatia
- Coordinates: 45°22′05″N 16°40′28″E
- Country: Croatia
- Region: Continental Croatia (Banovina)
- County: Sisak-Moslavina
- Municipality: Sunja

Area
  - Total: 16.9 km^{2} (6.5 sq mi)
- Elevation: 93 m (305 ft)

Population (2021)
  - Total: 248
  - Density: 14.7/km^{2} (38.0/sq mi)
- Time zone: UTC+1 (CET)
  - Summer (DST): UTC+2 (CEST)
- Postal code: 44214 Bobovac
- Area code: (+385) 44

Bobovac is a village in central Croatia, in the municipality of Sunja, Sisak-Moslavina County. It is located in the Banija region.

== Demographics ==
According to the 2011 census, the village of Bobovac has 330 inhabitants. This represents 44.40% of its pre-war population. According to the 1991 census, 99.20% of the village population were ethnic Croats (744/out of the 750 residents).

Population change 1857-2011
v

| population | 624 | 884 | 948 | 1096 | 1184 | 1238 | 1275 | 1294 | 1358 | 1356 | 1213 | 1020 | 899 | 750 | 506 | 330 |
| | 1857 | 1869 | 1880 | 1890 | 1900 | 1910 | 1921 | 1931 | 1948 | 1953 | 1961 | 1971 | 1981 | 1991 | 2001 | 2011 |

Sources: Croatian Bureau of Statistics publications
