= Kladari, Bosnia and Herzegovina =

Kladari Кладари
- Village
- Location within Bosnia and Herzegovina
- Coordinates: 44°47′43″N 18°1′45″E
- Country: Bosnia and Herzegovina
- Entity: Republika Srpska
- Municipality: Doboj
- Time zone: UTC+1 (CET)
  - Summer (DST): UTC+2 (CEST)

Kladari (Cyrillic: Кладари) is a village in the municipality of Doboj, Republika Srpska, Bosnia and Herzegovina.
