= Mala Gradusa =

- Village
- Location of Mala Gradusa in Croatia
- Coordinates: 45°20′00″N 16°28′00″E
- Country: Croatia
- Region: Continental Croatia (Banovina)
- County: Sisak-Moslavina
- Municipality: Sunja

Area
  - Total: 2.9 km^{2} (1.1 sq mi)
- Elevation: 141 m (463 ft)

Population (2021)
  - Total: 5
  - Density: 1.7/km^{2} (4.5/sq mi)
- Time zone: UTC+1 (CET)
  - Summer (DST): UTC+2 (CEST)
- Postal code: 44211 Blinjski Kut
- Area code: (+385) 44

Mala Gradusa is a village in central Croatia, in the municipality of Sunja, Sisak-Moslavina County. It is located in the Banija region.

== Demographics ==
According to the 2011 census, the village of Mala Gradusa has 20 inhabitants. This represents 14.49% of its pre-war population according to the 1991 census.

According to the 1991 census, the village had a population of 138, with Serbs constituting the majority (129, 93,47%).

Population change 1857–2011
v

population	120	158	179	213	267	281	272	277	208	209	190	179	145	138	57	20	5
	1857	1869	1880	1890	1900	1910	1921	1931	1948	1953	1961	1971	1981	1991	2001	2011	2021

Sources: Croatian Bureau of Statistics publications
