= Bačko Dobro Polje =

Bačko Dobro Polje Бачко Добро Поље (Serbian)
- Village (Selo)
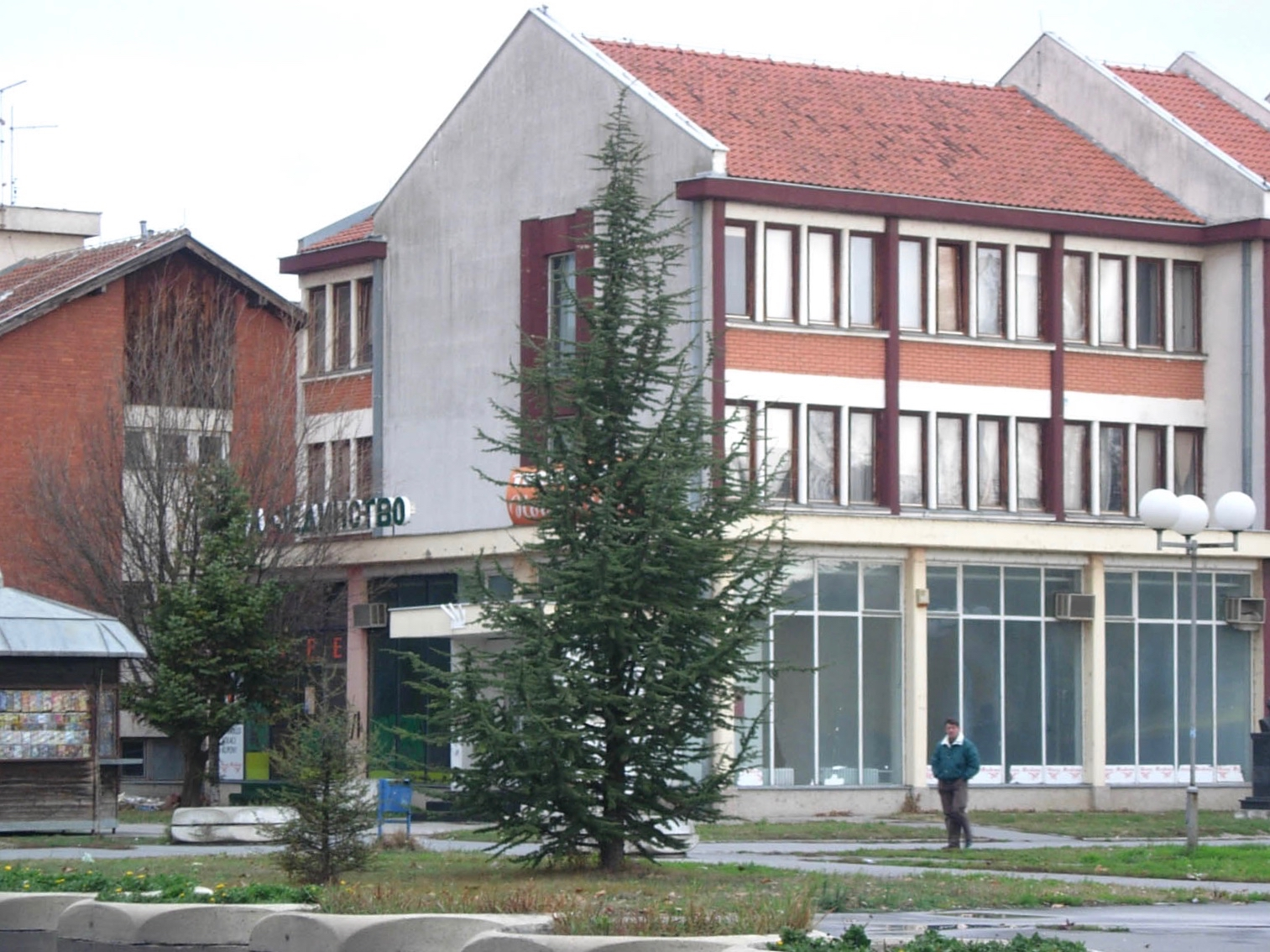
- Building in centre of the village.

- Location within Vojvodina Location within Serbia Location within Europe
- Coordinates: 45°30′N 19°41′E
- Country: Serbia
- Province: Vojvodina
- Region: Bačka (Podunavlje)
- District: South Bačka
- Municipality: Vrbas

Population (2022)
  - Total: 2,992
- Time zone: UTC+1 (CET)
  - Summer (DST): UTC+2 (CEST)

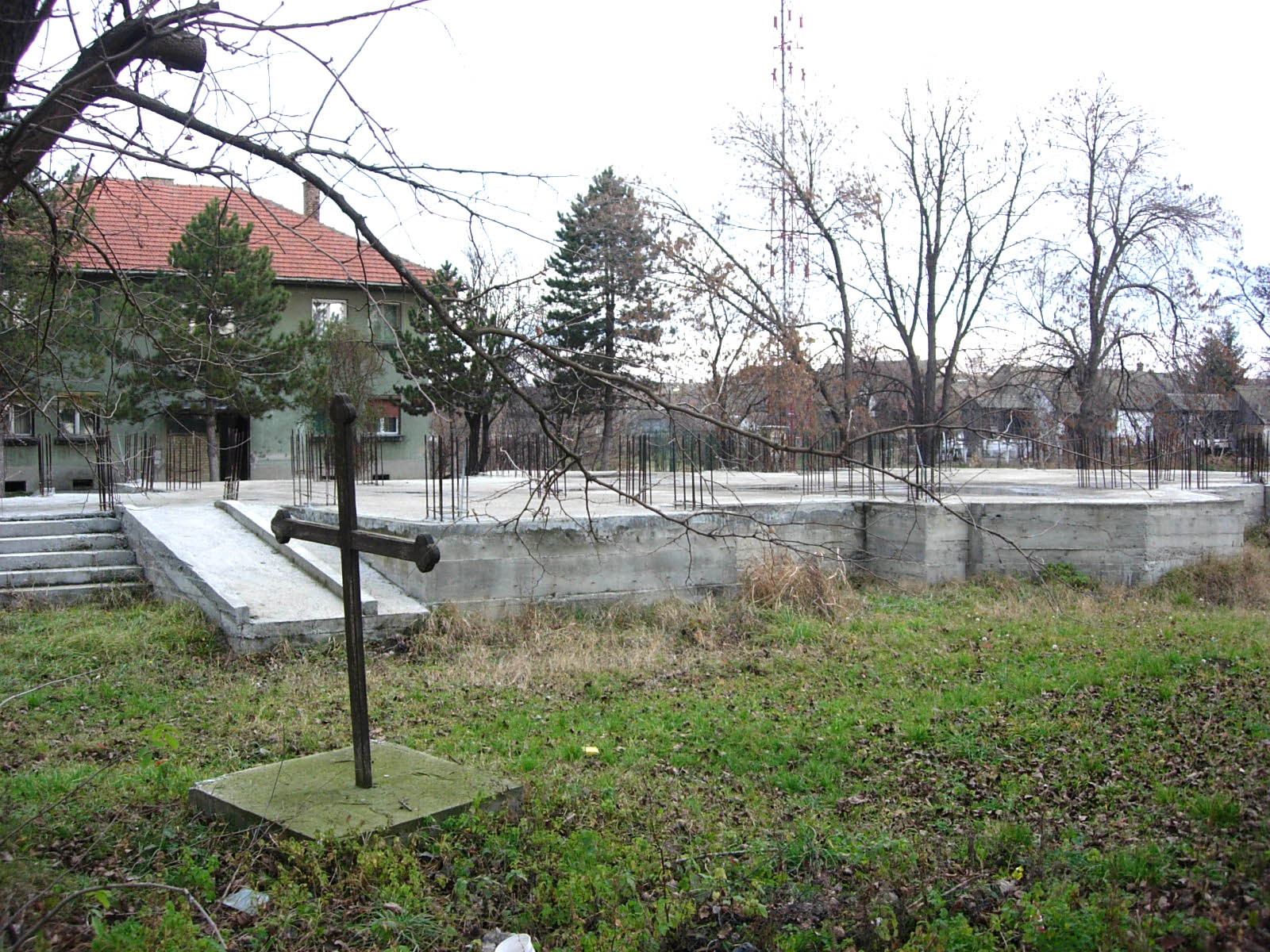
The future Orthodox church.

Bačko Dobro Polje (Serbian Cyrillic: Бачко Добро Поље; Hungarian: Kiskér) is a village in Serbia, in the Autonomous Province of Vojvodina. It is located in the South Bačka District. Administratively it belongs to the municipality of Vrbas. The village population numbering 2,992 people (2022 census) has a Serb ethnic majority. It was mostly constructed by settlers from Montenegro in the early 1950s.

== Demographics ==
=== Population ===
- 1961: 3,922
- 1971: 3,622
- 1981: 3,768
- 1991: 3,940
- 2002: 3,929
- 2011: 3,541
- 2022: 2,992

=== Ethnic groups ===
According to data from the 2022 census, ethnic groups in the village include:

- 2,424 (81%) Serbs
- 360 (12%) Montenegrins
- Others/Undeclared/Unknown

== Sport ==
Sutjeska is a football club in Bačko Dobro Polje.

According to their Montenegrin roots, they named the football club after the football club from the Montenegrin town of Nikšić. "FK Sutjeska" is a member of "Druga Vojvođanska liga Zapad" (Second Vojvodinian League West) and is currently occupying a low position in the league. However, it had some decent moments in the past and played important role in the Serbian football scene.

== See also ==
- List of places in Serbia
- List of cities, towns and villages in Vojvodina
