= Četvrtkovac =

- Village
- Location of Četvrtkovac in Croatia
- Coordinates: 45°21′03″N 16°31′48″E
- Country: Croatia
- Region: Continental Croatia (Banovina)
- County: Sisak-Moslavina
- Municipality: Sunja

Area
  - Total: 6.3 km^{2} (2.4 sq mi)
- Elevation: 113 m (371 ft)

Population (2021)
  - Total: 139
  - Density: 22/km^{2} (57/sq mi)
- Time zone: UTC+1 (CET)
  - Summer (DST): UTC+2 (CEST)
- Postal code: 44210 Sunja
- Area code: (+385) 44

Četvrtkovac is a village in central Croatia, in the municipality of Sunja, Sisak-Moslavina County. It is located in the Banija region.

== Demographics ==
According to the 2011 census, the village of Četvrtkovac has 232 inhabitants. This represents 45.58% of its pre-war population. According to the 1991 census, 88.02% of the village population were ethnic Serbs (448/509).

Population change 1857-2011
v

population	332		607	438	520	619	740	599	397	471	564	592	541	509	350	232
	1857	1869	1880	1890	1900	1910	1921	1931	1948	1953	1961	1971	1981	1991	2001	2011

Sources: Croatian Bureau of Statistics publications

Note: The 1869 data is reported under the Drljača settlement while the 1880 data includes data for the Drljača settlement.
