= Veliko Krčevo =

- Village
- Interactive map of Veliko Krčevo
- Location within Croatia
- Country: Croatia
- Sisak-Moslavina County: Sisak-Moslavina County

Area
  - Total: 1.7 sq mi (4.4 km^{2})

Population (2021)
  - Total: 48
  - Density: 28/sq mi (11/km^{2})
- Time zone: UTC+1 (CET)
  - Summer (DST): UTC+2 (CEST)
- Postal code: 44434
- Area code: (+385)44

Veliko Krčevo (Serbian Cyrillic: Велико Крчево) is a village in Sisak-Moslavina County, Croatia, 19,6 km north from Hrvatska Kostajnica, a historic city on the river Una.

== Demographics ==
According to the 2021 census, there are 48 inhabitants.

Naselje Veliko Krčevo: Population trends 1857–2021
v

population	350	328	362	438	459	537	506	476	308	342	316	235	188	154	112	79	48
	1857	1869	1880	1890	1900	1910	1921	1931	1948	1953	1961	1971	1981	1991	2001	2011	2021

Note:Vidi napomenu kod naselja Malo Krčevo. Do 1931. sadrži podatke za bivše naselje Krčevo. Sources: Publikacije Državnog zavoda za statistiku Republike Hrvatske

Its elevation is 130 m.

The chief occupation is farming.
