= Gornje Komarevo =

Coordinates: 45°25′N 16°25′E

- Village
- Interactive map of Gornje Komarevo
- Country: Croatia
- County: Sisak-Moslavina County

Area
  - Total: 6.8 km^{2} (2.6 sq mi)

Population (2021)
  - Total: 425
  - Density: 62/km^{2} (160/sq mi)
- Time zone: UTC+1 (CET)
  - Summer (DST): UTC+2 (CEST)

Gornje Komarevo is a village in Croatia. It is connected by the D224 highway.
