= Donje Komarevo =

Coordinates: 45°24′N 16°27′E

- Village
- Interactive map of Donje Komarevo
- Country: Croatia
- County: Sisak-Moslavina County

Area
  - Total: 12.5 km^{2} (4.8 sq mi)

Population (2021)
  - Total: 255
  - Density: 20.4/km^{2} (52.8/sq mi)
- Time zone: UTC+1 (CET)
  - Summer (DST): UTC+2 (CEST)

Donje Komarevo is a village in Croatia. It is connected by the D224 highway. In 2021, the population was 255.
