= Medvednica Fault Zone =

Seismic fault zone in Zagreb, Croatia

The Medvednica Fault Zone is a fault zone in northern Croatia. It is named after the mountain Medvednica. The fault zone strikes ENE–WSW and is seismically active. The movements along the fault are sinistral and connected to the counterclockwise movements of the Adriatic plate. The fault also shows signs of thrusting.

The North Medvednica Fault, a reverse fault which reaches the surface at the northern fringe of Medvednica, is believed to be responsible for the 2020 Zagreb earthquake, which caused a M_{L}5.5 earthquake with an epicentre in the inner city area. The most dangerous fault on Medvednica is thought to be the NNW–SSE-oriented strike-slip Kašina Fault, passing through Kašina, around 16 km (10 mi) from the city centre, which could produce earthquakes up to M_{L}6.5–6.6 in strength. Some of the research following the 2020 earthquake indicates that the M_{L}6.3 1880 earthquake, thought to have been caused by the Kašina Fault, was actually a product of the North Medvednica Fault, and Kašina's capacity for earthquakes was revised down to M_{L}5.88.
