= Church of St. George and the Name of Mary, Zagreb =

St. George Church and Name of Mary (Croatian: Župna crkva sv. Jurja mučenika i Imena Marijina)
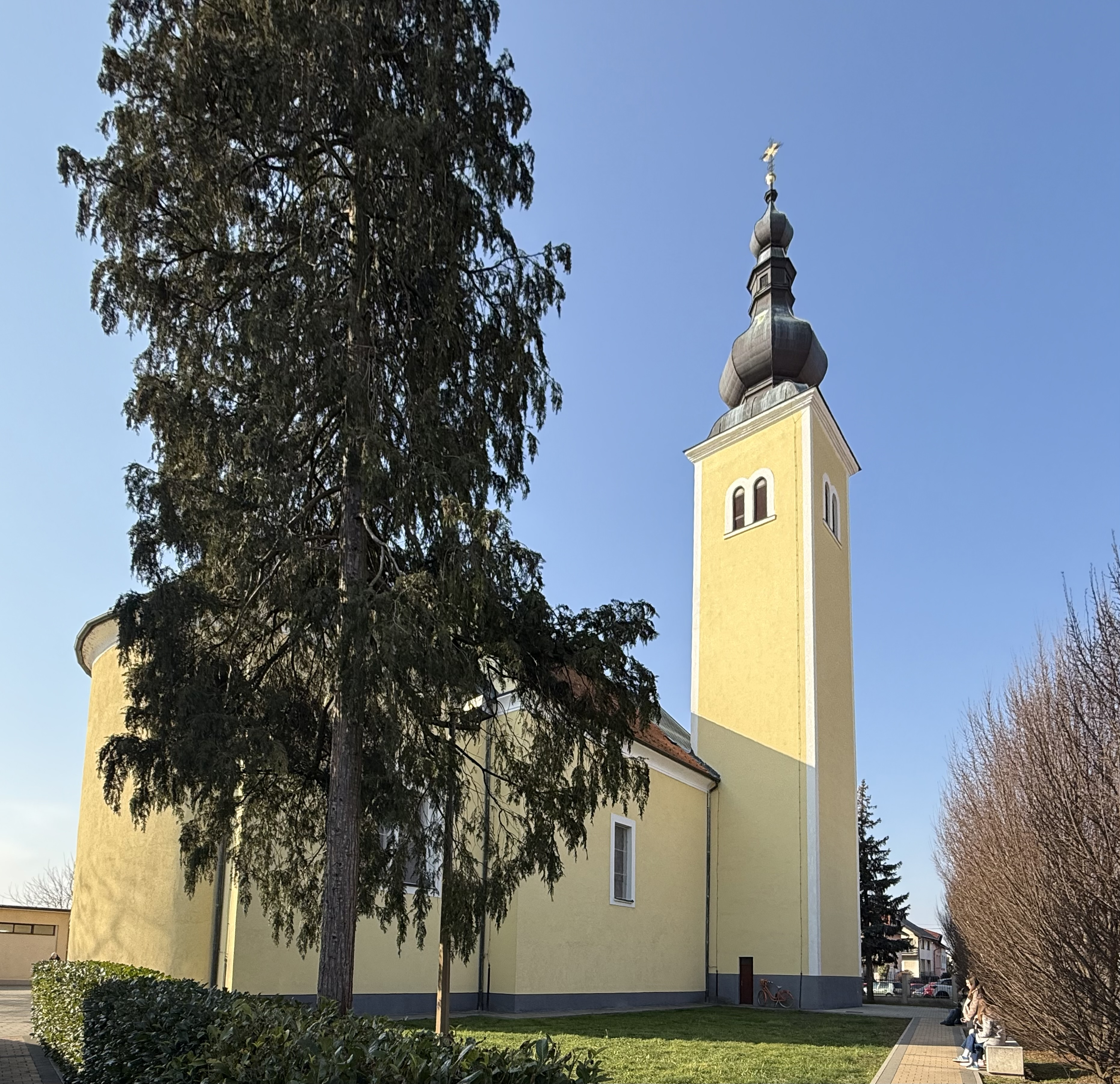
- Church in 2025
- St. George Church and Name of Mary (Croatian: Župna crkva sv. Jurja mučenika i Imena Marijina)
- 45°43′46″N 15°59′34″E
- Location: Zagreb
- Country: Croatia
- Denomination: Roman Catholic

History
- Consecrated: 1966

Architecture
- Functional status: Active
- Groundbreaking: 1749
- Completed: 1780

St. George Church and Name of Mary (Croatian: Župna crkva sv. Jurja mučenika i Imena Marijina u Odri) is a Catholic parish church located in the neighbourhood Odra of Zagreb, Croatia. The church was built gradually from 1749 to 1780.

== History ==
The church that existed on the present site was first mentioned in canonical visitations from the early 17th century. The present parish church was completed in 1980, and the last extensive renovation was carried out in 1954. The church was solemnly consecrated in 1966.

During the earthquake that struck Zagreb and Sisak-Moslavina County on 29 December 2020, part of the facade, including the gable part of the church, detached and collapsed, which was subsequently restored.

== Artwork ==
The interior of the church is adorned with a historic statue of the Mother of God from the 18th century. It is assumed that the statue was originally placed on the altar of the side chapel of the Name of Mary (today's sacristy), which was financed by the Škrlec nobles during the construction of the church in the 18th century. The Škrlec nobles had a family crypt for burial at that location.

== Galerija ==
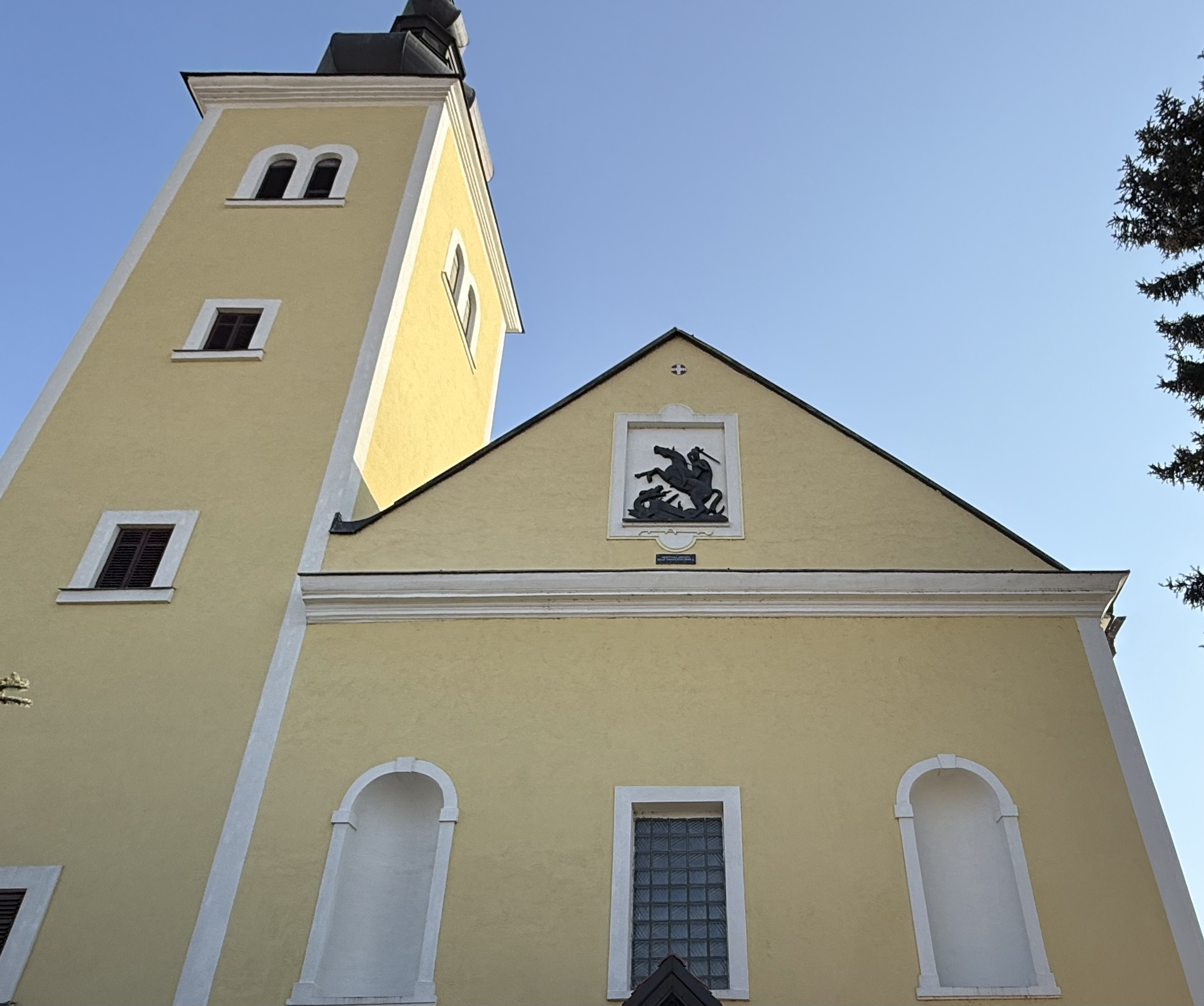
Facade

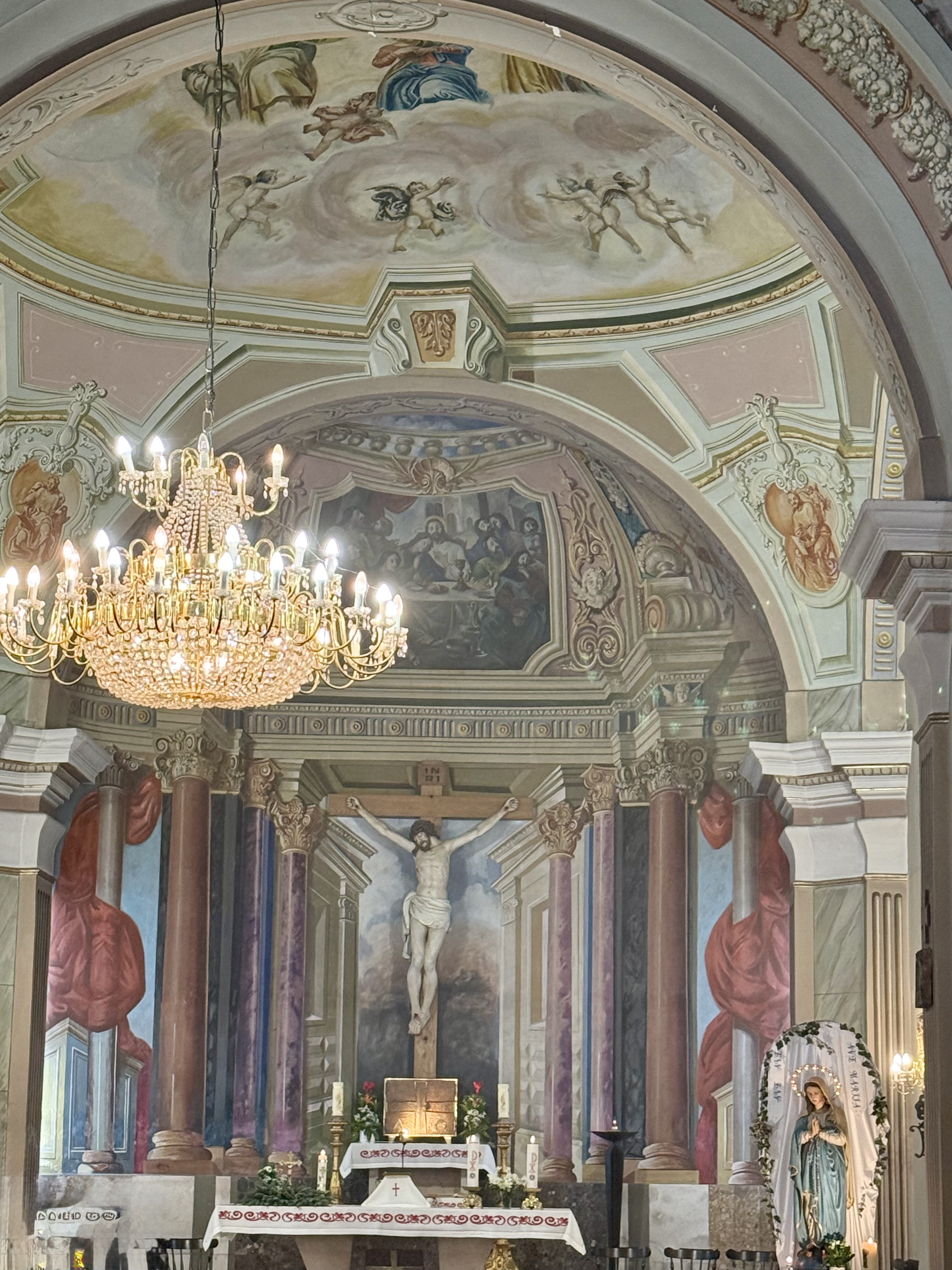
Interior of the church

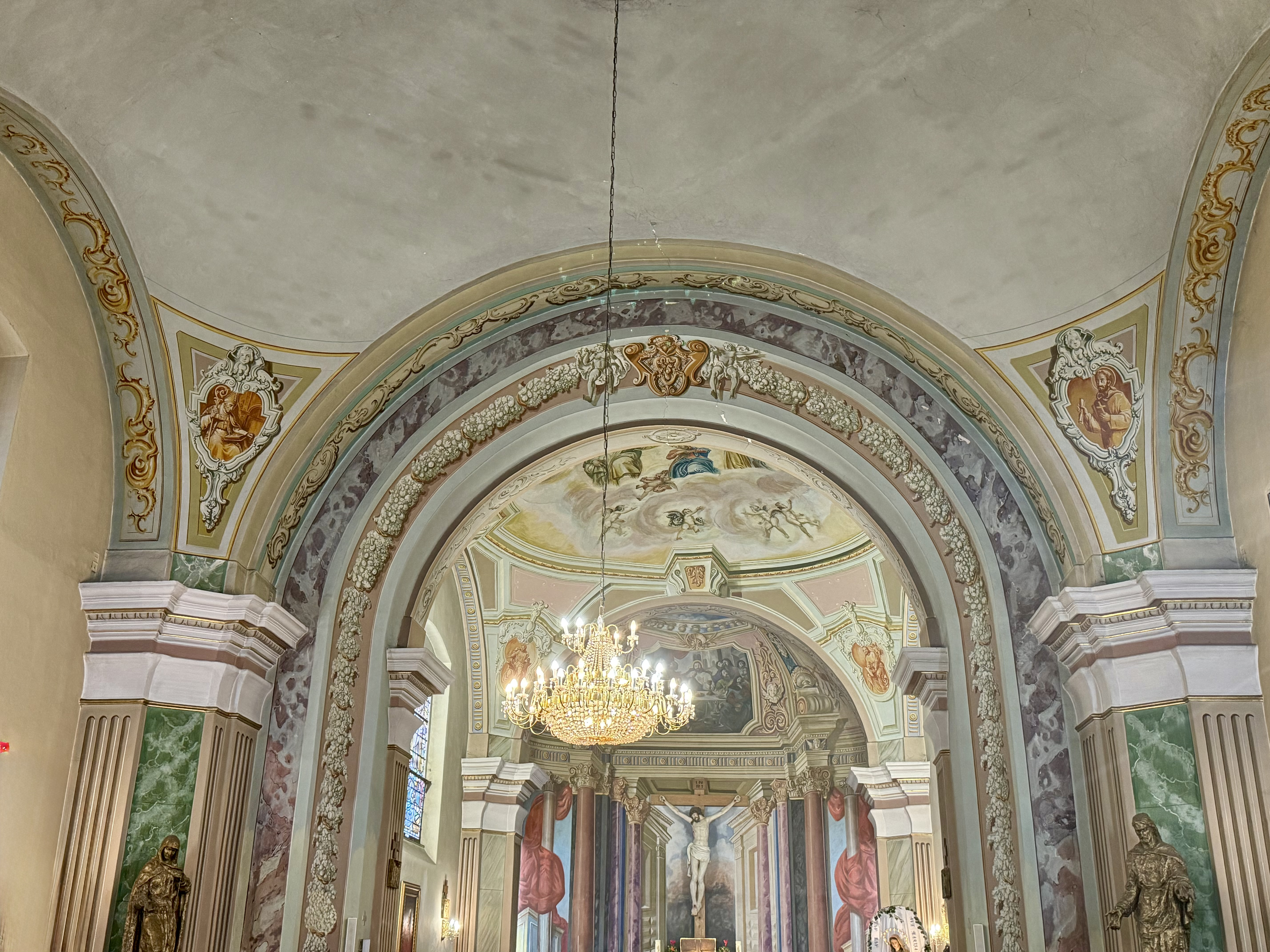
Interior of the church

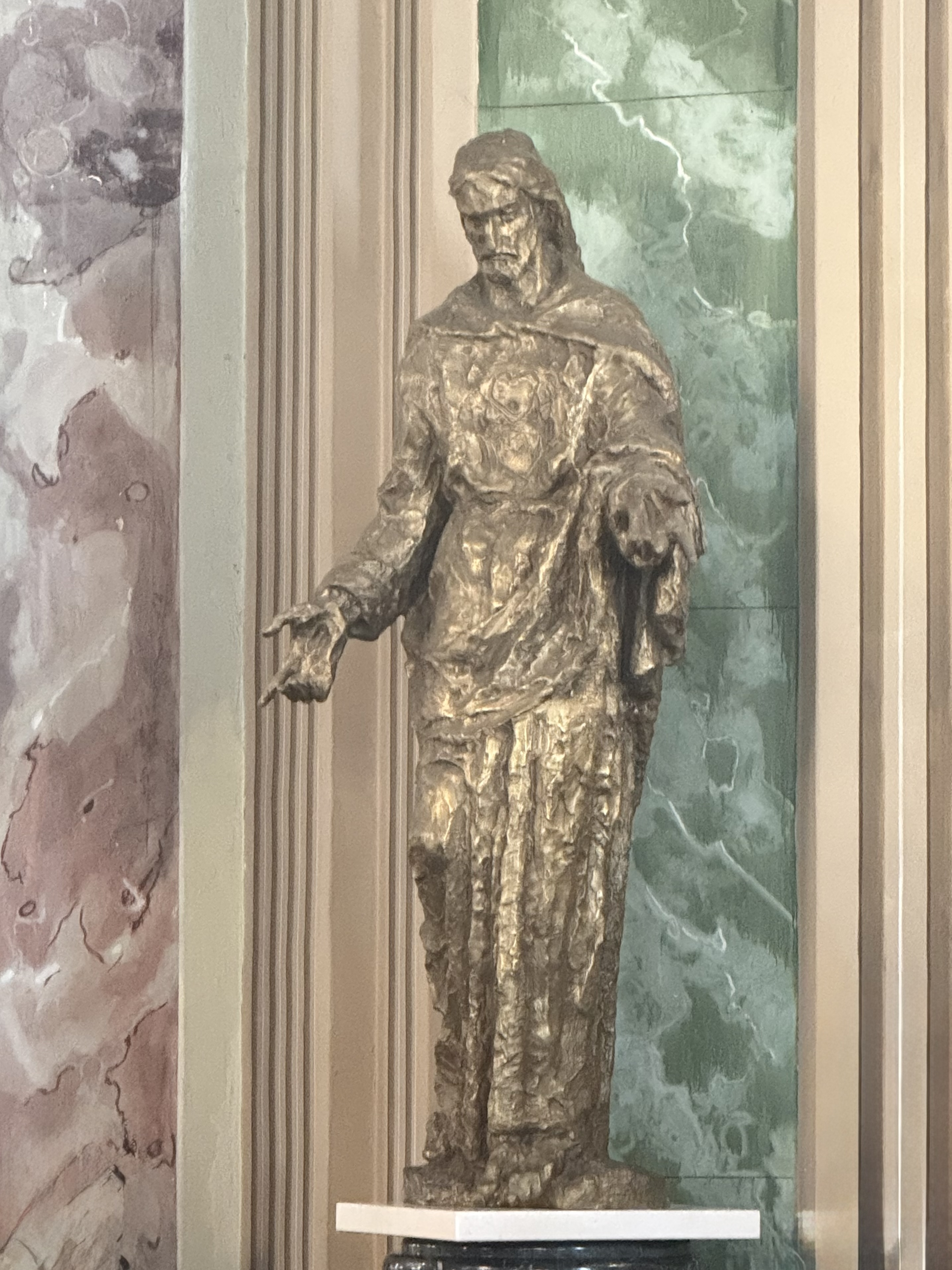
Sculpture of Jesus

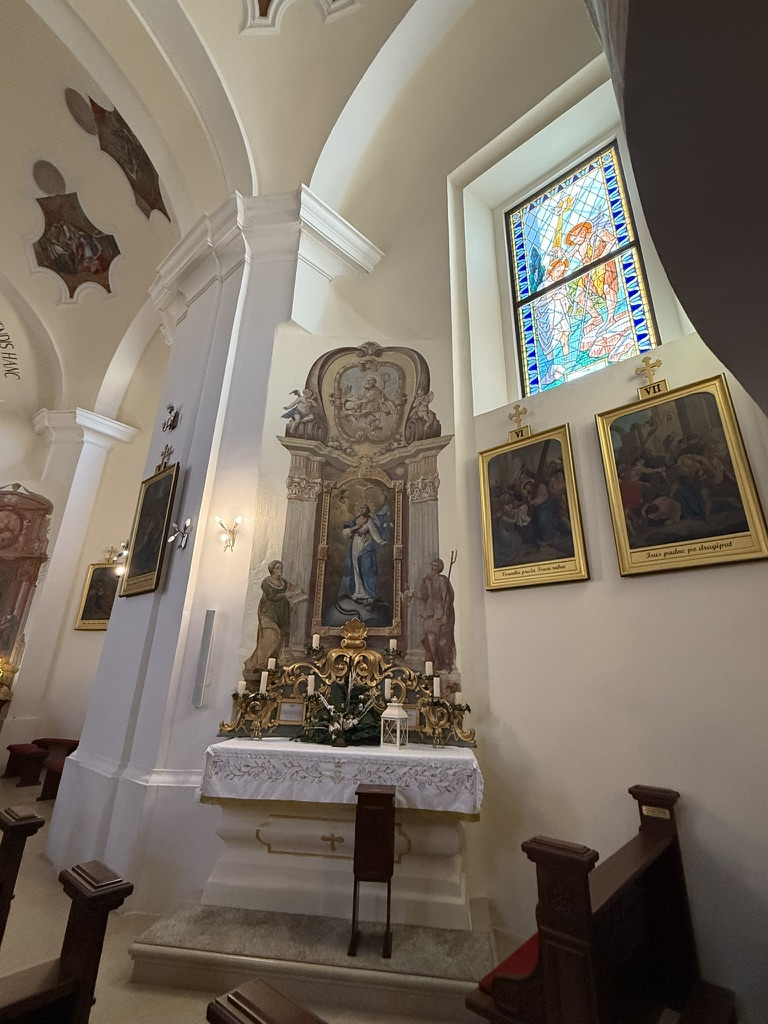
Interior of the church

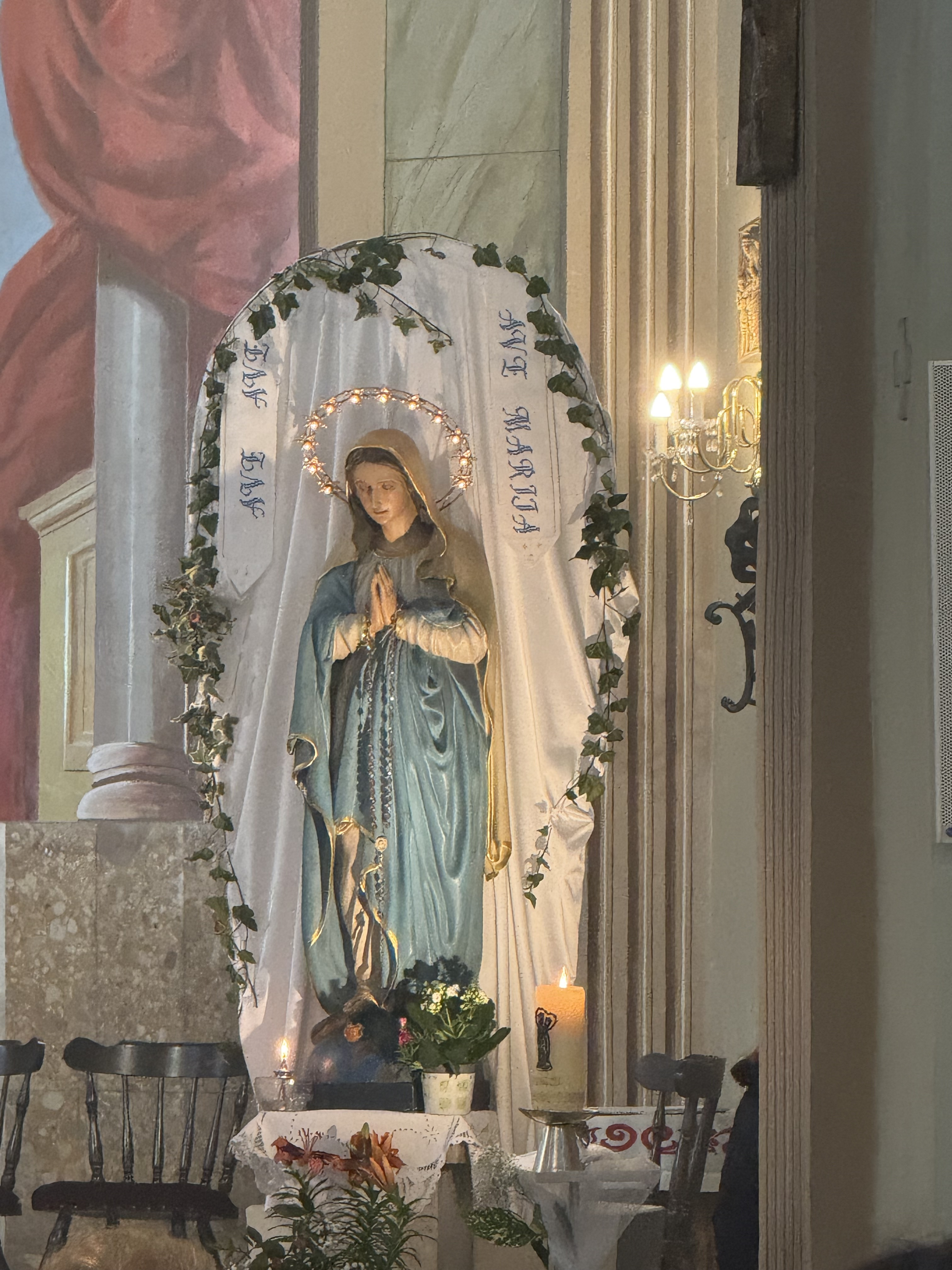
Statue of the Mother of God

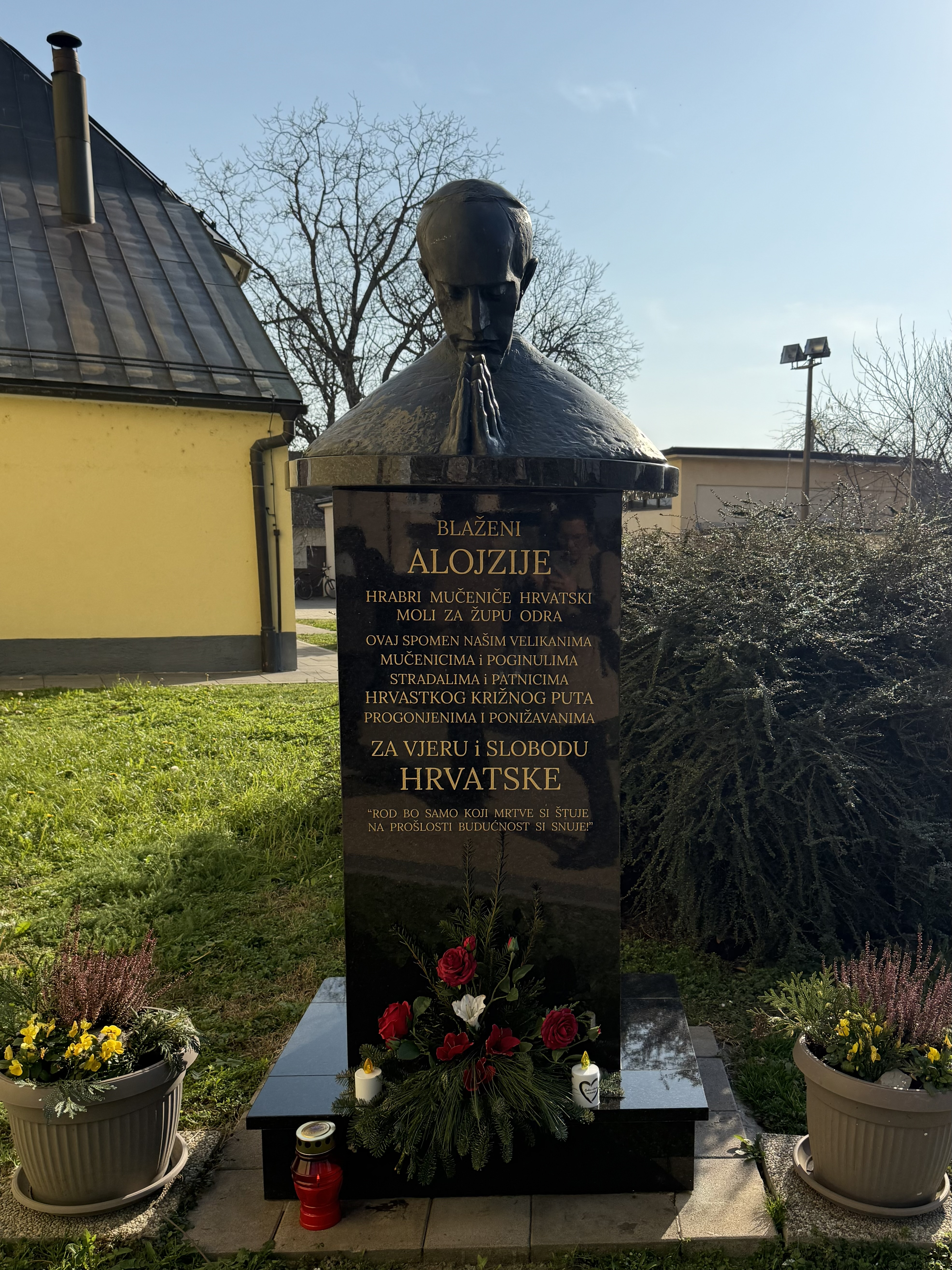
Sculpture of the Blessed Alojzije Stepinac in front of the church
