= List of earthquakes in 1880 =

There were two notable earthquakes in the year of 1880.

- 1880 Zagreb earthquake in Croatia
- 1880 Luzon earthquakes in the Philippines

== See also ==
- Category:1880 earthquakes
- List of historical earthquakes § 19th century
