= Ivan Standl =

Ivan Standl (October 27, 1832 – August 30, 1897) was one of the first professional photographers in Zagreb, present-day Croatia, known mostly for his award-winning documentary work. He is the author of the first Croatian photobook, published in 1870.

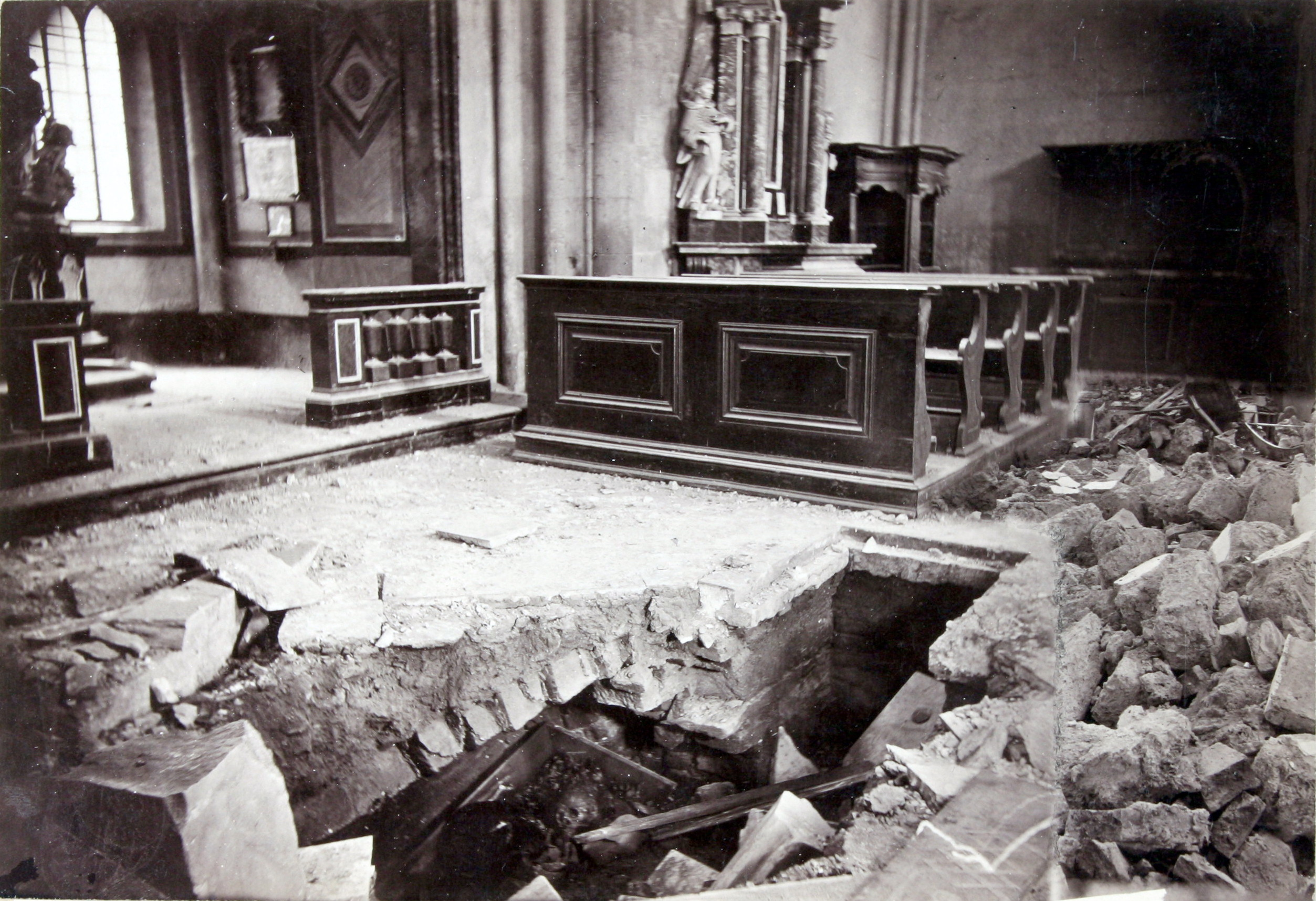
As a part of a series documenting the destruction caused by the 1880 Zagreb earthquake, Standl photographed the damaged interior of the Zagreb Cathedral.

Ivan Standl was of Czech descent and was born in Prague in 1832. It is not known for certain when he moved to Zagreb, but the first record of his activities there dates from 1864, when he won the first prize at the Business Fair (Gospodarska izložba). His works also appeared and won prizes at international exhibitions in Moscow (1872), London (1874), Trieste (1882) and Budapest (1885).

Standl created photographic portraits of many prominent individuals of the era, such as writer August Šenoa, bishop Josip Juraj Strossmayer, ban Levin Rauch, violin virtuoso Franjo Krežma, historian and politician Ivan Kukuljević Sakcinski, Zagreb mayor Matija Mrazović and others. His most important works were, however, taken in the open, documenting Croatia's natural and architectural monuments. Standl is also the author of the first known photograph of Baška tablet, dating from 1869.

In 1869, Standl announced his intention to create a series of photographs of natural and cultural heritage of Croatia. He started with the execution of his plan in March of the same year, publishing one volume per month, each containing two photographs. All 24 photographs were published in August 1870 as a book titled Fotografijske slike iz Dalmacije, Hrvatske i Slavonije ("Photographic images from Dalmatia, Croatia and Slavonia"). Accompanying text was provided by Ivan Kukuljević Sakcinski, Radoslav Lopašić, Ivan Trnski, Adolfo Veber Tkalčević and several other writers signed with their initials only.

The photobook received high praise in Vienac magazine, and its second edition won a prize at a London exhibition in 1874. Although there were plans for a follow-up volume, it was never published; the book was apparently fairly expensive, which made the project unprofitable.

In 1880, Standl made a series of photographs, later published as an album, documenting the aftermath of the 1880 Zagreb earthquake. The photographs depict prominent public buildings, mostly churches and castles, that were damaged in the earthquake.

Standl's opus earned him high reputation, and he was named as one of five official photographers whose works were featured at the 1896 Millennium Exhibition in Budapest.
