= Žažina =

Coordinates: 45°30′N 16°15′E

- Village
- Interactive map of Žažina
- Country: Croatia
- County: Sisak-Moslavina County

Area
  - Total: 6.3 km^{2} (2.4 sq mi)

Population (2021)
  - Total: 275
  - Density: 44/km^{2} (110/sq mi)
- Time zone: UTC+1 (CET)
  - Summer (DST): UTC+2 (CEST)

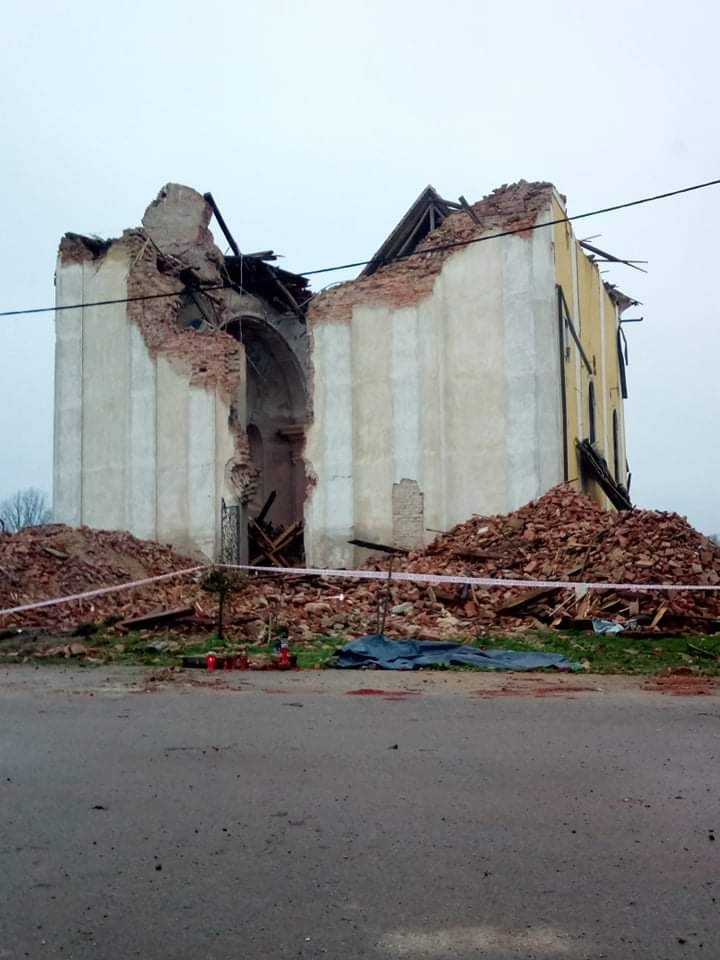
Church of St. Nicholas destroyed in 2020 Petrinja earthquake

Žažina is a village in Croatia.
