= Branka Bakšić Mitić =

Croatian activist

- Бранка Бакшић Митић
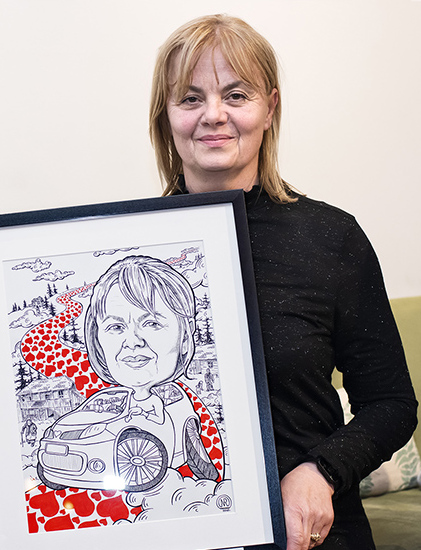
- Born: Branka Mitić; August 1961 (age 64–65); Zagreb, PR Croatia, FPR Yugoslavia
- Citizenship: Croatia
- Occupations: humanitarian activist; politician
- Spouse: Dinko Bakšić
- Children: 1

Branka Bakšić Mitić (Serbian Cyrillic: Бранка Бакшић Митић; born August 1961) is a Croatian humanitarian activist. Her work is primarily focused on the underdeveloped and depopulated villages of Banovina region. She has been an elected representative of the Serbs of Croatia in Glina since 2017. Her work attracted significant public attention in the aftermath of the 2020 Petrinja earthquake.

== Early life ==
Branka Mitić was born in August 1961 in a Serb family in Zagreb, but grew up in Glina. Her father died when she was 10 years old and she grew up with a single mother. She is married to Dinko Bakšić, who is a Croat and the brother of former mayor of Glina, Milan Bakšić. She has a daughter, Maja, and a granddaughter, Andreja. At the beginning of the Croatian War of Independence, Bakšić Mitić was in Germany together with family where she stayed for some time before moving to Zagreb. In 2010, she moved back to Glina.

== Public work in Glina ==
Since the 2017 Croatian local elections, she is the deputy mayor of the town of Glina, elected as a representative of the Serb national minority. Due to an unwillingness to cooperate on Glina mayor's part, Bakšić Mitić described her elected function as lacking any powers.

Bakšić Mitić is a 2019 recipient of the Ponos Hrvatske (Pride of Croatia) award, given by the 24sata media company. She also received the Strašne žene (Fierce Women) prize from Vox Feminae.

Together with a Croatian Radiotelevision journalist Maja Sever, she started the Ljudi za ljude (People for People) humanitarian initiative in which they organize a collection of humanitarian aid for Banovina in Zagreb.

== 2020 Petrinja earthquake ==
Branka Bakšić Mitić's work attracted significant public interest in the aftermath of the 2020 Petrinja earthquake. On 3 January 2021, she was a guest on the Sunday prime time Nedjeljom u dva talk show. During his visit to the affected area on 13 January 2021, the President of Croatia Zoran Milanović organized a meeting with three local representatives, which were the mayors of Petrinja and Sisak, and Bakšić Mitić. A prominent writer Miljenko Jergović, in his column for Večernji list, called Branka Bakšić Mitić an "ideal of hard-headed solidarity".

Year after state authorities in Croatia were still failing to significantly advance reconstruction of numerous towns and villages and Bakšić Mitić still keeps on informing media of terrible living conditions and despair of people living in the area.
