= Strašnik =

Coordinates: 45°24′N 16°13′E

- Village
- Interactive map of Strašnik
- Country: Croatia
- Region: Continental Croatia (Banija)
- County: Sisak-Moslavina
- Municipality: Petrinja

Area
  - Total: 10.2 km^{2} (3.9 sq mi)

Population (2021)
  - Total: 163
  - Density: 16.0/km^{2} (41.4/sq mi)
- Time zone: UTC+1 (CET)
  - Summer (DST): UTC+2 (CEST)

Strašnik is a village in Croatia. The epicenter of 2020 Petrinja earthquake was located in the village.
