= Basilica of the Heart of Jesus, Zagreb =

Basilica of the Heart of Jesus
- Bazilika Srca Isusova
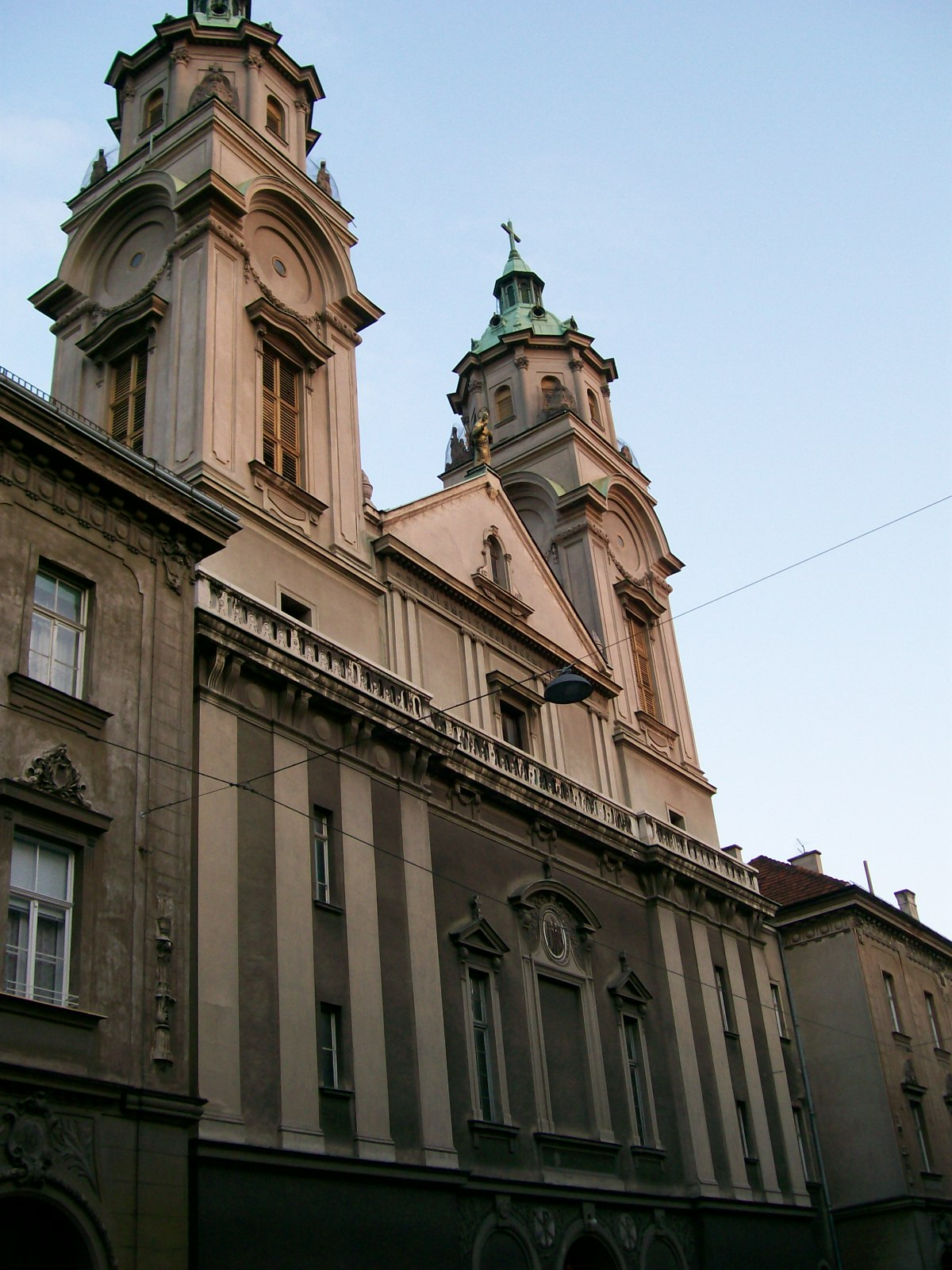
- Facade of the church
- Basilica of the Heart of Jesus
- 45°48′32″N 15°58′56″E
- Location: Zagreb
- Country: Croatia
- Denomination: Roman Catholic
- Religious order: Society of Jesus
- Website: www.zupa-presvetog-srca-isusova.hr

History
- Consecrated: 15 December 1902

Architecture
- Functional status: Active
- Architects: Janko Holjac (building); Hermann Bollé (main altar)
- Architectural type: Basilica
- Style: Neo-Baroque
- Groundbreaking: 27 August 1901
- Completed: 1902

Specifications
- Capacity: c. 3000
- Length: 59.13 m
- Width: 24.65 m

The Basilica of the Heart of Jesus (Croatian: Bazilika Srca Isusova) is a Roman Catholic basilica located in Palmotićeva street of Zagreb, Croatia. It is dedicated to the Sacred Heart, and was designed by the Croatian architect Janko Holjac in the neo-Baroque style.

The Basilica of the Heart of Jesus is the second largest church in Zagreb, after the Zagreb Cathedral. It is used by the Jesuits.

== History ==
The construction of the church is tied to the arrival of Jesuits in Zagreb in 1855. For this purpose, the archbishop Juraj Haulik gave a sum of 60,000 florins in 1860. However, political and economic conditions were not favorable for Haulik's idea, and it was revived four decades later by archbishop Juraj Posilović, who donated an additional sum of 12,000 florins. In 1898, a land parcel was bought for the construction of the church in the Palmotićeva street in the Lower town of Zagreb. The basilica of Heart of Jesus was finished and consecrated in 1902, with the construction itself taking slightly over a year. In 1941, the church received the status of minor basilica.

The church was heavily damaged in the 2020 Zagreb earthquake, and as of 2024 is under renovation and reconstruction.

== Gallery ==
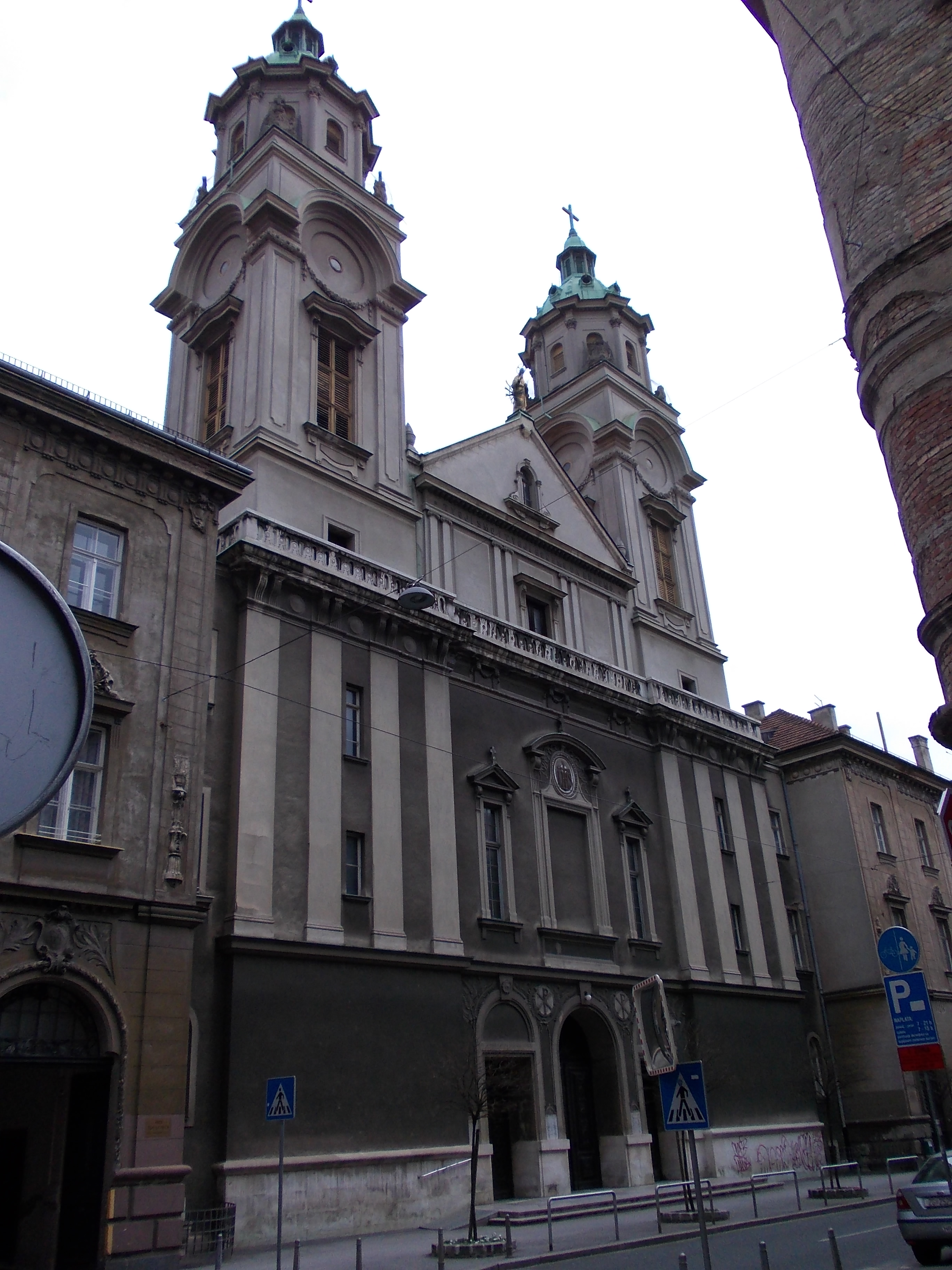
Facade

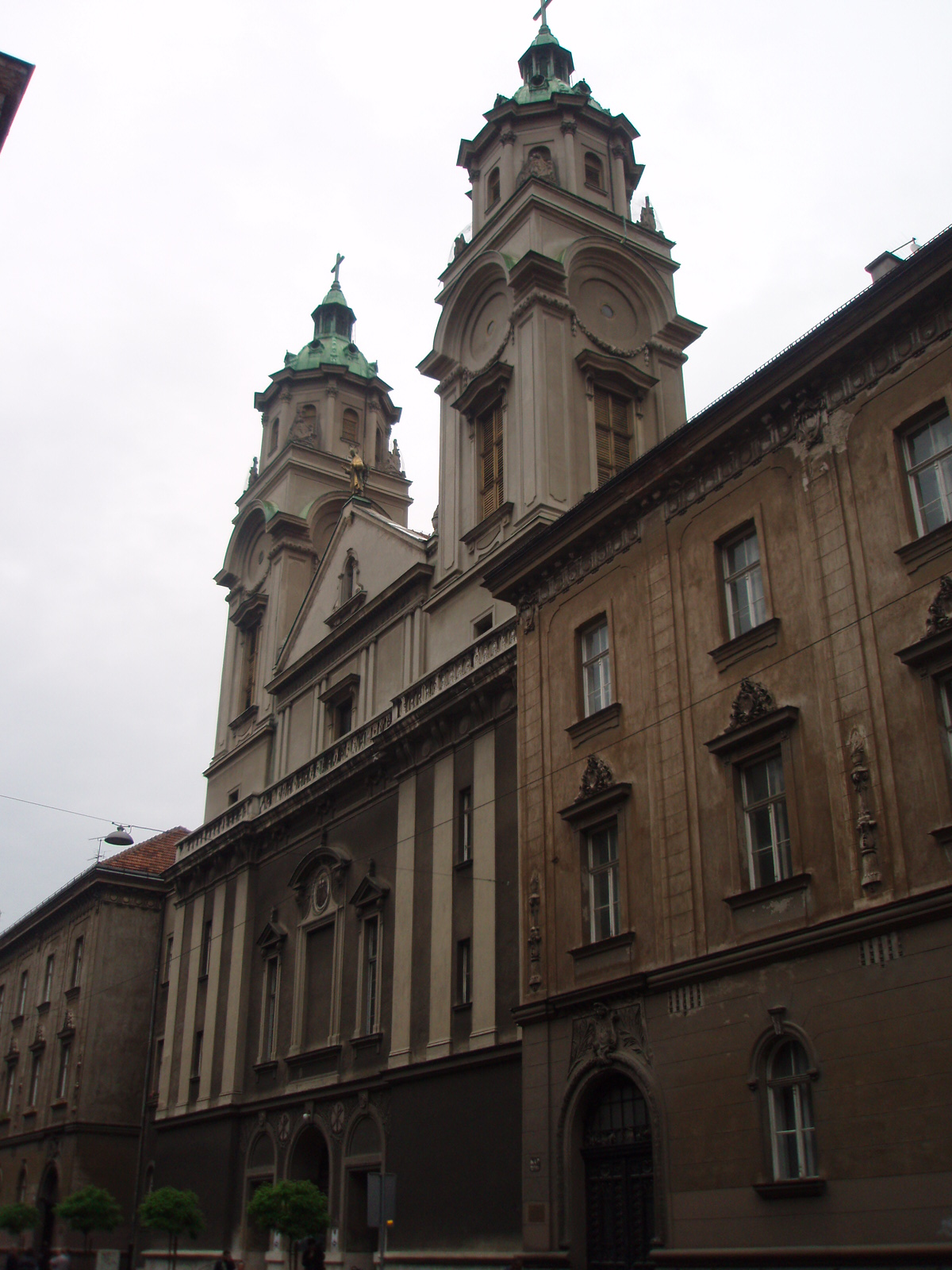
South view

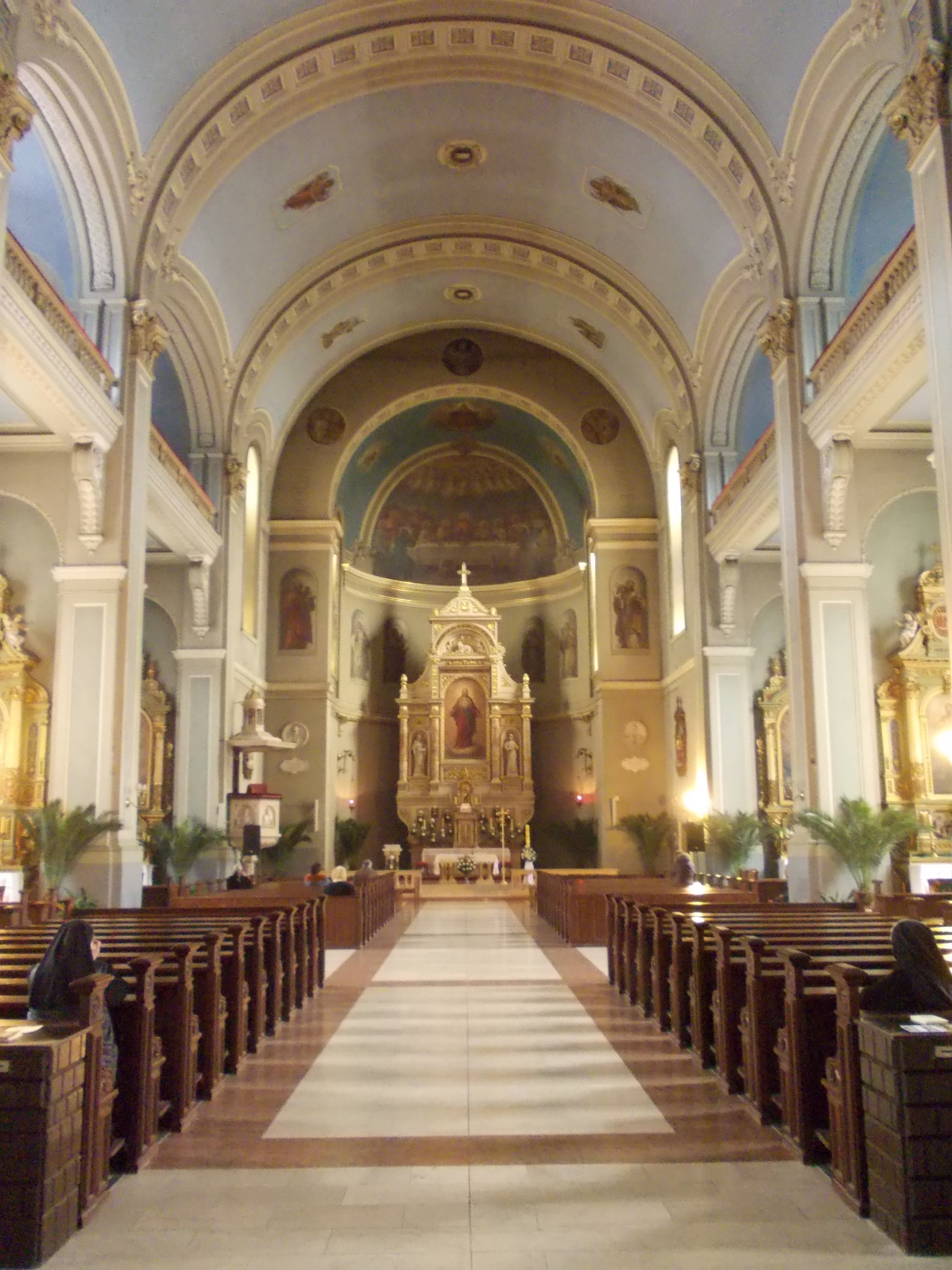
Interior

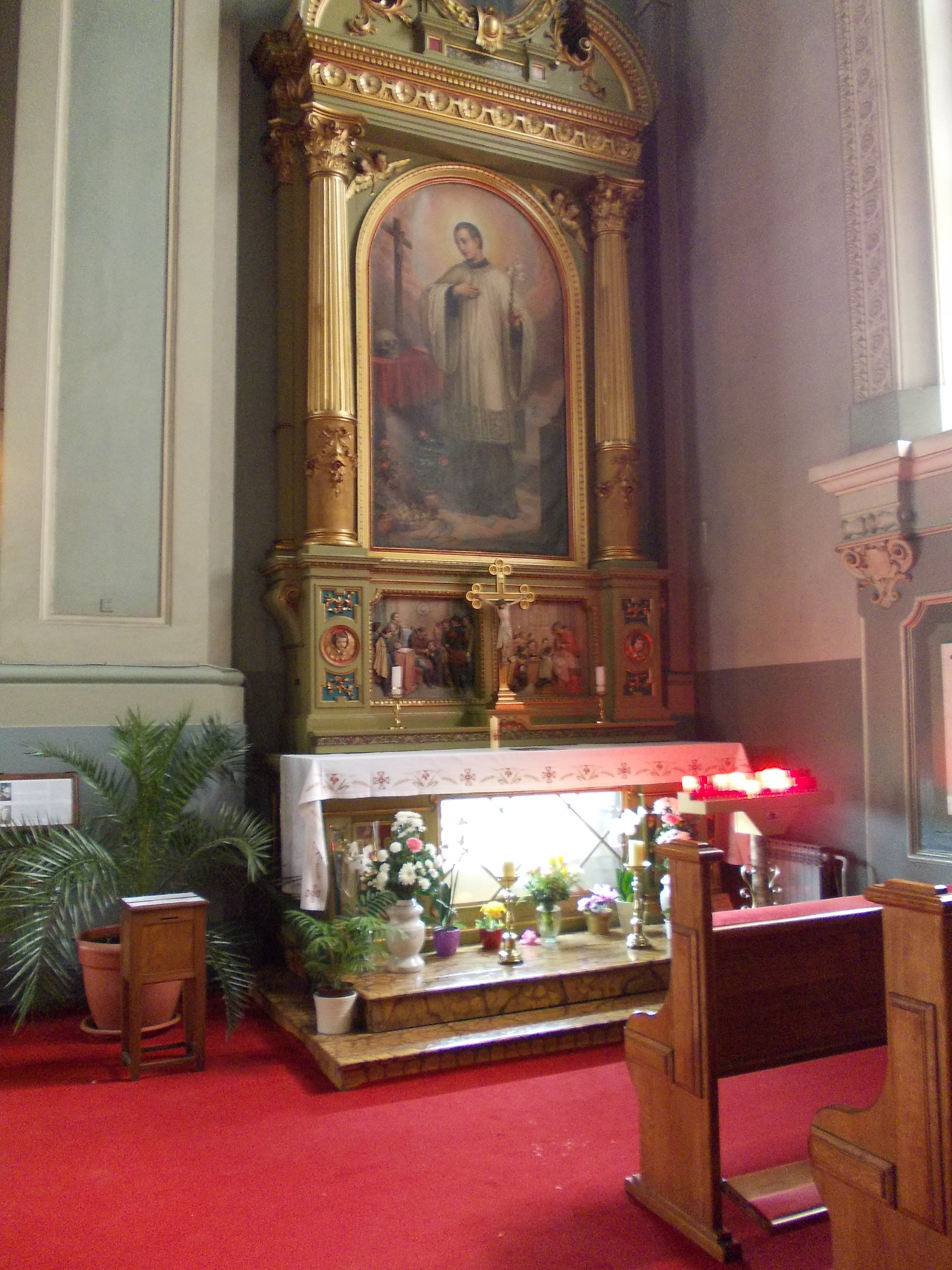

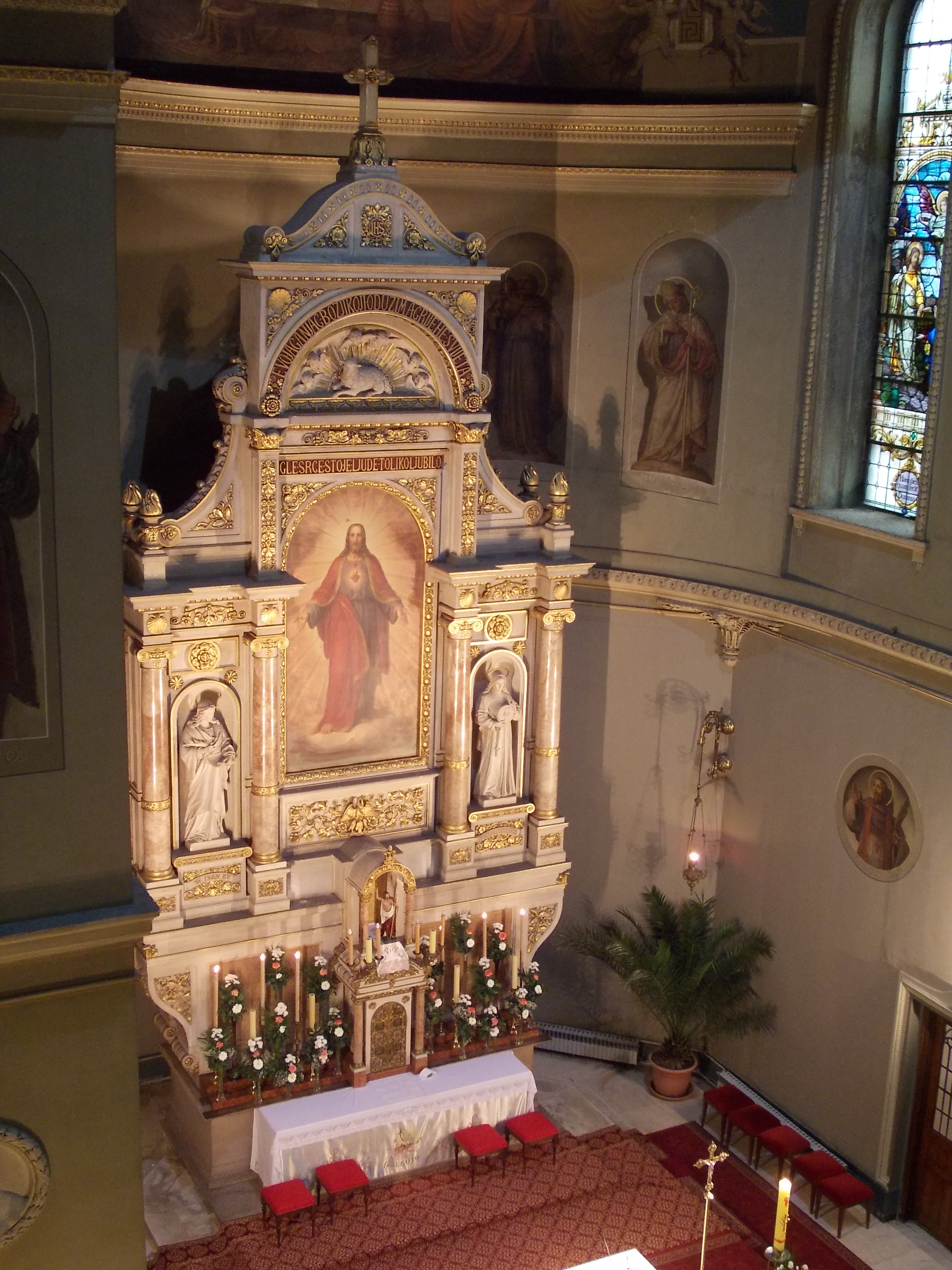
Altar

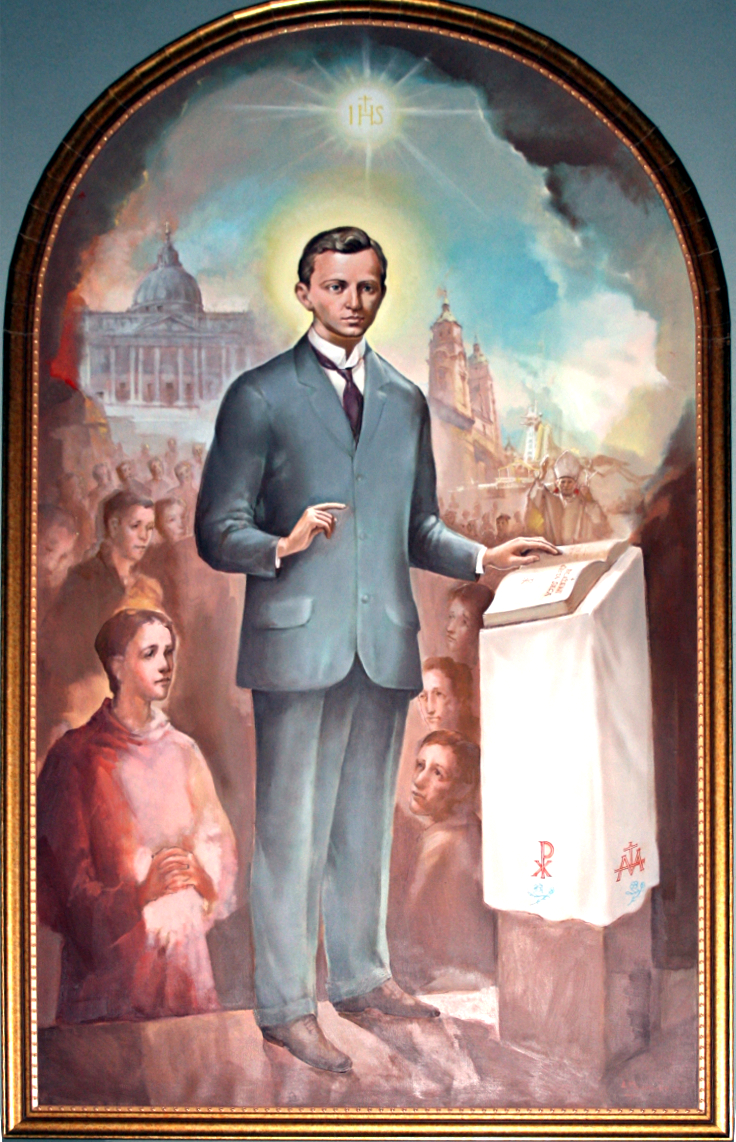
Memorial of Ivan Merz

== Panorama ==
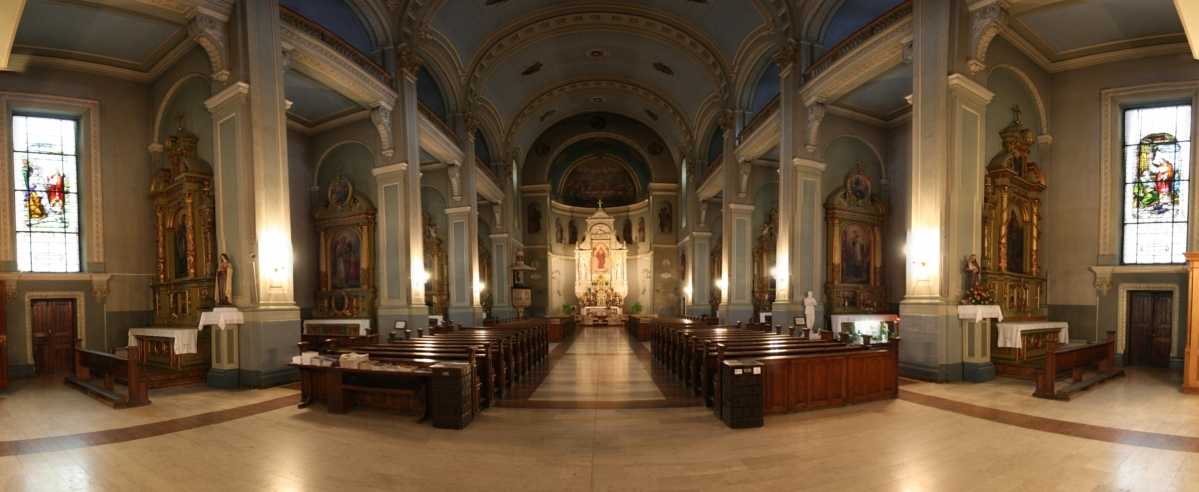
Panoramic view of Church's Interior and Main Naive

== See also ==
- List of Jesuit sites

== Sources ==
- Maruševski, Olga (August 1991). "Bazilika Srca Isusova u Zagrebu" [The Basilica of the Heart of Jesus in Zagreb] (PDF). Obnovljeni život (in Croatian). 46 (3–4): 342–351.
- Szabo, Agneza (2002). "Političke i crkvene okolnosti u doba gradnje Bazilike Srca Isusova u Zagrebu. Drugi dolazak Isusovaca u Zagreb" [Political and ecclesiastic condition in the time of building the Basilica of Sacred Heart of Jesus in Zagreb. The second arrival of the Jesuits in Zagreb]. Godišnjak Društva za povijest Zagrebačke Nadbiskupije Tkalčić (in Croatian) (6): 191–230. ISSN 1331-3517.
