= 2020 Petrinja earthquake =

Earthquake in Croatia

- Potres u Petrinji 2020.
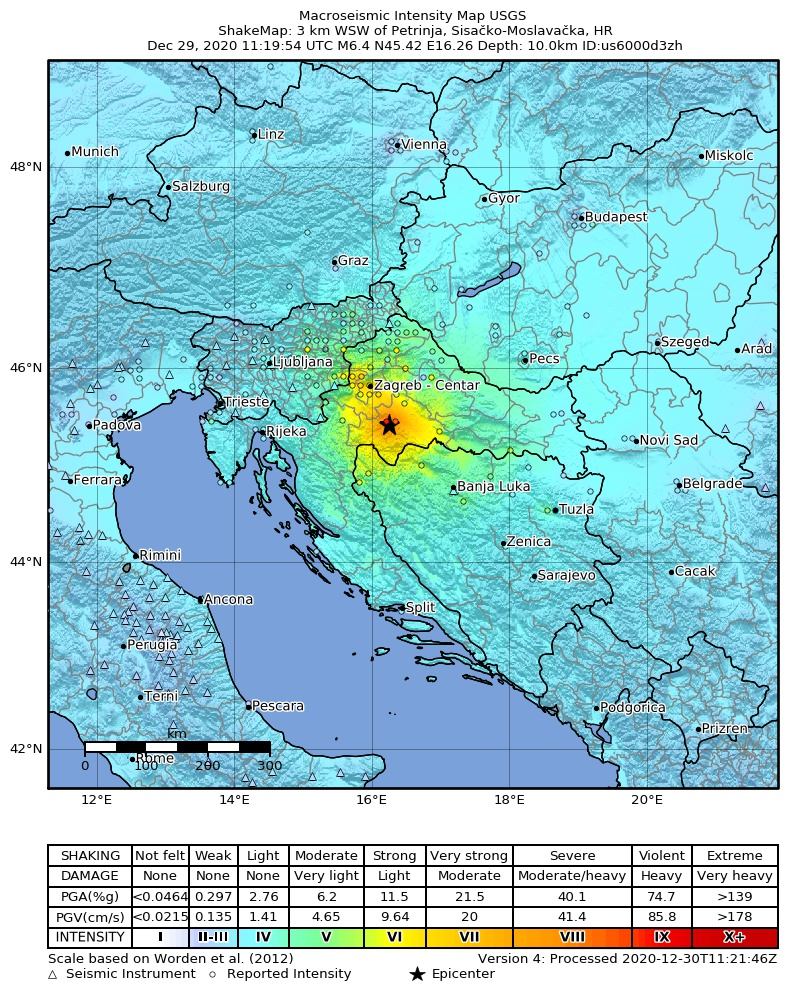

- Location within Croatia
- UTC time: 2020-12-29 11:19:54
- ISC event: 621237334
- USGS-ANSS: ComCat
- Local date: 29 December 2020
- Local time: 12:19 p.m. CET (UTC+1)
- Duration: 26 seconds
- Magnitude: 6.4 M_{w} 6.2 M_{L}
- Depth: 10 km (6.2 mi)
- Epicentre: 45.4002°N 16.2187°E
- Type: Strike-slip
- Areas affected: Croatia (Sisak-Moslavina County, Karlovac County, Zagreb County, City of Zagreb); Northwestern Bosnia and Herzegovina; Slovenia; Southern Hungary, Austria, Northern Italy
- Total damage: 5–5.5 billion euros
- Max. intensity: MMI IX (Violent)
- Peak acceleration: 0.4 g
- Foreshocks: 3 with a M_{L} 4.0 or greater Largest: M_{w} 5.2 at 05:28 UTC, 28 December 2020
- Aftershocks: Numerous; Largest: M_{w} 4.9 at 17:01 UTC, 6 January 2021
- Casualties: 9 fatalities (2 indirect), 26 injuries

At 12:19 PM CET (11:19 UTC) on 29 December 2020, an earthquake of magnitude 6.4 M_{w} (6.2 M_{L}) hit central Croatia, with an epicenter located roughly 3 km (1.9 mi) west-southwest of Petrinja. The maximum felt intensity was estimated at VIII (Heavily damaging) to IX (Destructive) on the European macroseismic scale. Before this event there were three foreshocks, the strongest of which had a magnitude of 5.2 M_{w} on the day before. The earthquake was followed by numerous aftershocks, the strongest of which had a magnitude of 4.9 M_{w}.

The adversely affected areas were mostly in the Sisak-Moslavina County and other nearby Croatian counties, as well as some of the nearby areas of Bosnia and Slovenia. There were nine confirmed deaths, including seven during the quake and two workers from falling debris while repairing damaged structures in the aftermath, and 26 people were injured.

== Tectonic setting ==
The epicenter is located in a hilly area just south of the Kupa-Sava alluvial plain, with the Zrinska gora mountain and the rest of the Dinaric Alps to the south.

The Pokuplje seismic area follows the Kupa river valley from Karlovac to Sisak. This area has been affected by several historical earthquakes, the best known being the major event in 1909 with the epicenter near Pokupsko, with aftershocks that continued into 1910. It had a maximum felt intensity of VIII on the MCS scale. This seismicity has been associated with reactivation of northwest–southeast trending normal faults that form the southwestern boundary of the Pannonian Basin.

The last earthquake on the territory of Croatia that had a magnitude of 6.0 M_{L} was in Ston in 1996. In 1969, the fault system which extends from Jastrebarsko over this area towards Banja Luka had a 6.6 M_{L} earthquake which hit the latter city, and that one was also preceded by significant foreshocks one day earlier. In 1880, a 6.3 M_{L} struck north-east of Zagreb. In March 2020, a 5.5 M_{L} earthquake struck the city of Zagreb.

== Earthquake ==
External videos
- Start of earthquake during live TV in Croatia, Tancredi Palmeri on Twitter, N1 Croatia cut. Recorded in Zagreb, 51 km (32 mi) from epicenter.

The earthquake had a magnitude of 6.4 M_{w} and a depth of 10 kilometres (6.2 mi) according to Advanced National Seismic System (ANSS) and European-Mediterranean Seismological Centre (EMSC), while the Seismological Survey of Croatia recorded 6.2 M_{L}. The maximum felt intensity was VIII (heavily damaging) to IX (destructive) on the European macroseismic scale (EMS) and IX (Violent) on the Modified Mercalli intensity scale (MMI).

The location and depth of this event show that it was an intraplate earthquake that occurred as a result of shallow strike-slip faulting within the Eurasian plate. The calculated focal mechanism for the event indicates that rupture occurred on a nearly vertical fault striking either to the southeast or southwest.

The Croatian Seismological Survey estimated the earthquake's epicentre at 45°24′0.72″N 16°13′7.32″E (45.4002, 16.2187), located near the village of Strašnik, within the town of Petrinja.

The earthquake was felt throughout northern Croatia, as well as in large parts of Slovenia, Austria, Bosnia and Herzegovina, Serbia, Hungary, Slovakia, and Italy, as well as in some parts of Montenegro, Germany, and the Czech Republic.

Modified Mercalli intensities in selected locations
MMI	Locations
MMI IX (Violent)	Cepeliš
MMI VIII (Severe)	Petrinja, Sisak, Budaševo
MMI VII (Very strong)	Orešje, Pokupsko, Zaprešić
MMI VI (Strong)	Zagreb
MMI V (Moderate)	Varaždin, Banja Luka
MMI IV (Light)	Munich
MMI III (Weak)	Rome, Belgrade, Budapest, Vienna

=== Foreshocks ===
Three foreshocks had hit the same area the day before, estimated by the CSS at magnitudes 5.0, 4.7 and 4.1 respectively.

Foreshocks of M_{w} 4.0 or greater
Date	Time (UTC)	M	MMI	Depth	Ref.
28 December	05:28	5.2	VI	10.0 km (6.2 mi)	
28 December	06:49	4.7	VI	10.0 km (6.2 mi)	

=== Aftershocks ===
There were 16 aftershocks M_{L} 3.0 or greater recorded within six hours of the main tremor according to CSS.

Aftershocks of M_{w} 3.0 or greater (those registered by the USGS)
Date	Time (UTC)	M	MMI	Depth	Ref.
29 December	12:34	4.4	VI	10.0 km (6.2 mi)	
30 December	05:15	4.8	V	10.0 km (6.2 mi)	
30 December	05:26	4.7	IV	10.0 km (6.2 mi)	
31 December	08:15	3.7	V	10.0 km (6.2 mi)	
2 January	18:00	3.4	III	9.3 km (5.8 mi)	
4 January	06:49	4.4	III	10.0 km (6.2 mi)	
5 January	06:11	3.3	II	10.0 km (6.2 mi)	
6 January	17:01	4.9	V	10.0 km (6.2 mi)	
7 January	11:06	4.0	III	9.9 km (6.2 mi)	
9 January	21:29	4.8	VI	8.7 km (5.4 mi)	
10 January	23:28	3.8	IV	9.6 km (6.0 mi)	
15 January	12:01	4.4	II	10.0 km (6.2 mi)	
24 February	09:58	3.9	IV	10.0 km (6.2 mi)	
3 March	04:37	4.2	III	10.9 km (6.8 mi)	
6 April	08:54	4.6	III	10.0 km (6.2 mi)	
1 August	23:27	4.1	IV	10.0 km (6.2 mi)	
16 August	23:58	4.6	V	10.0 km (6.2 mi)	

== Damage ==
The town of Petrinja was the worst affected, with many buildings collapsed and a major power outage. Damage and power outages were also reported in Dvor, Glina, Gvozd, Hrvatska Kostajnica, Kutina, Sisak, Sunja, Topusko, Velika Gorica, and Zagreb, as well as the neighbouring countries Bosnia and Herzegovina and Slovenia.

The total damage was estimated by World Bank consultants in cooperation with the Ministry of Construction and the Ministry of Regional Development and EU Funds. The total damage is estimated at 5 billion euros and may eventually increase to 5.5 billion euros.

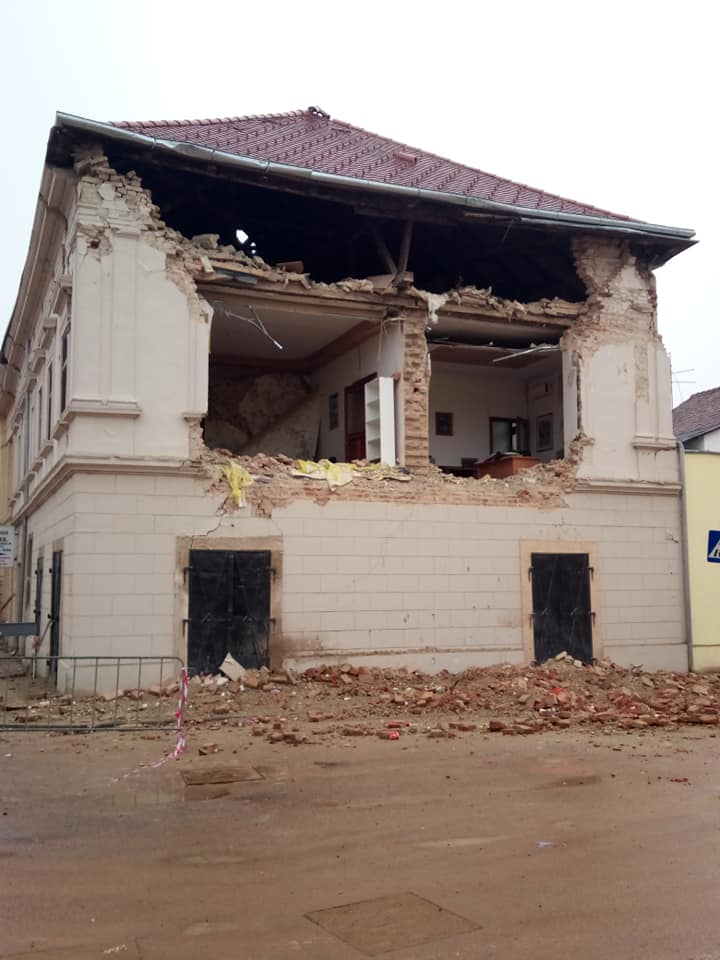

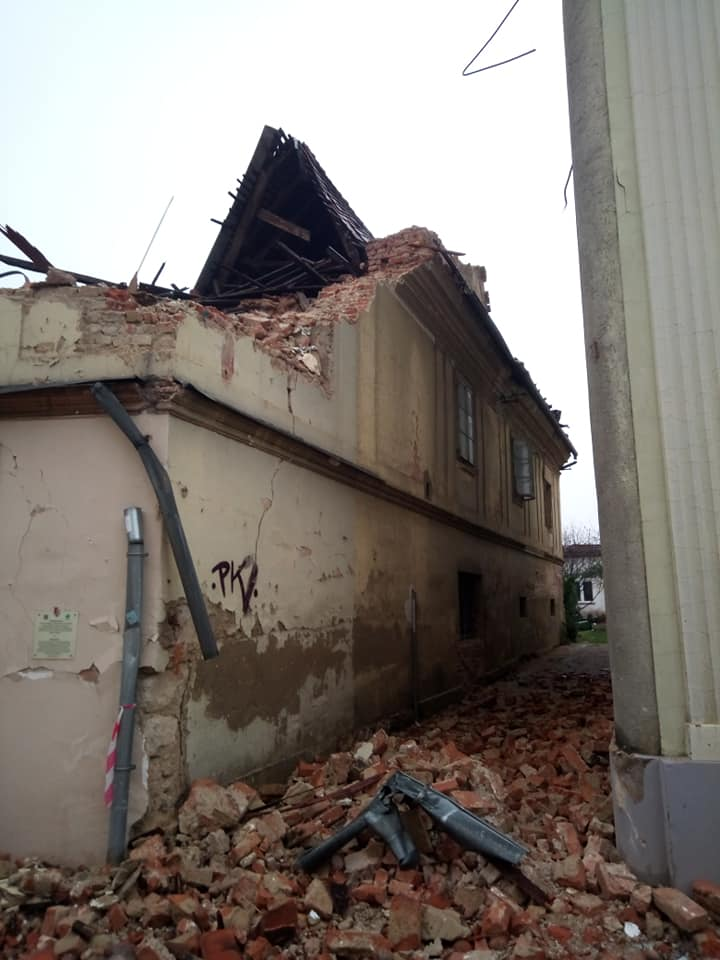

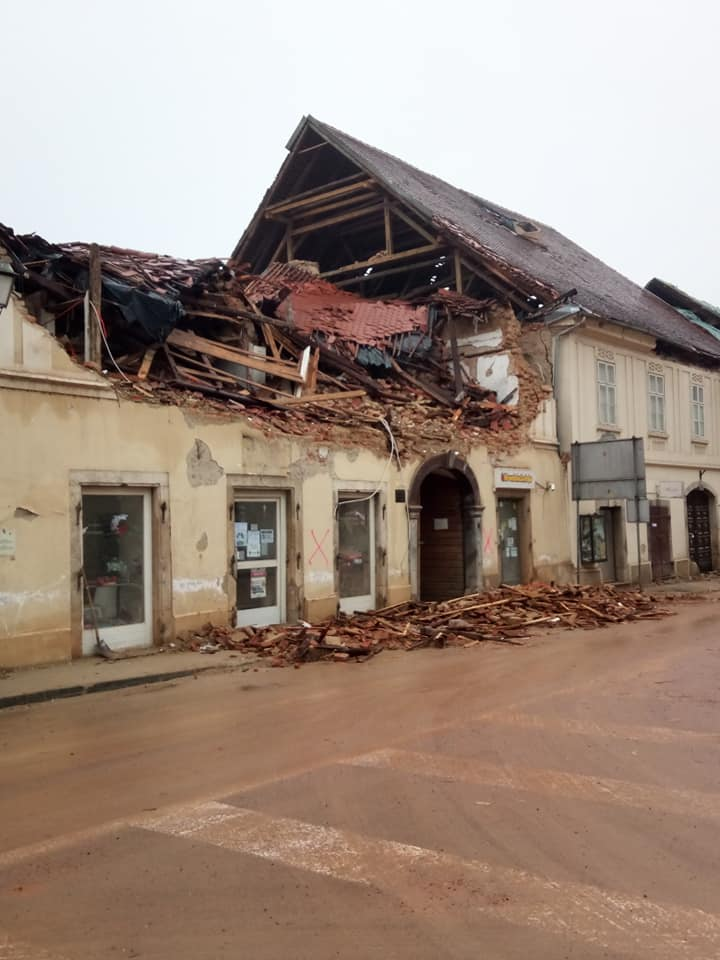

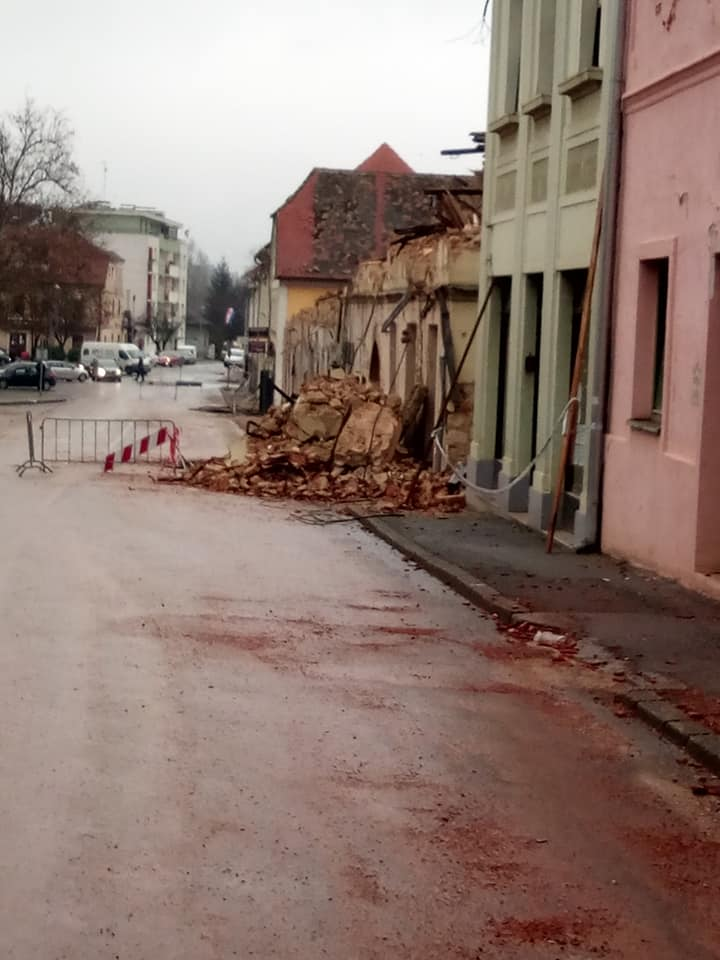

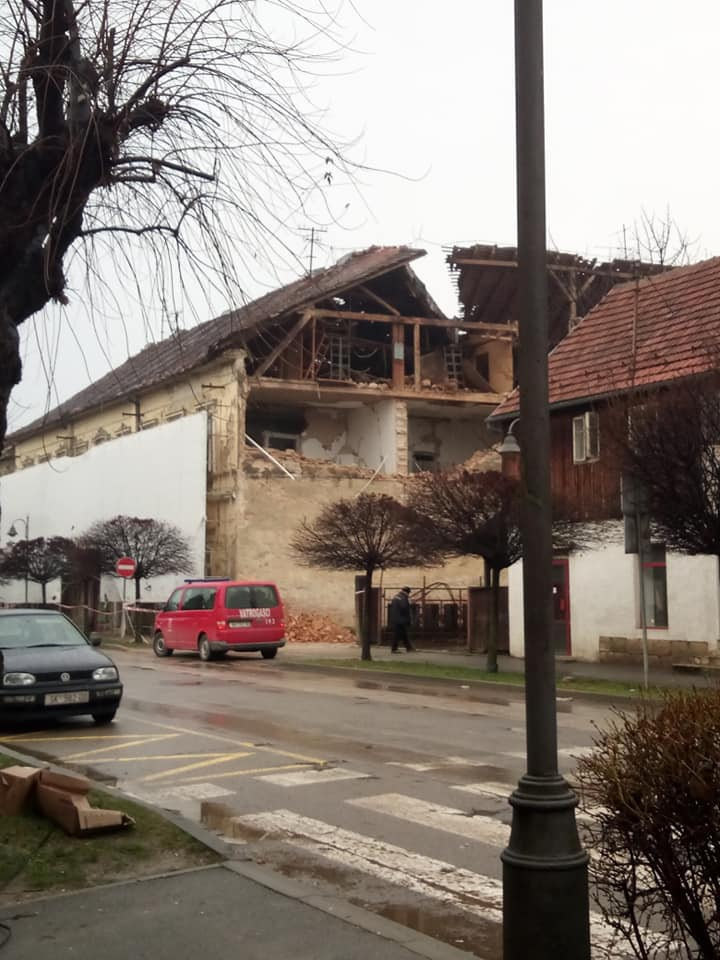

=== Sisak-Moslavina County ===
In Petrinja, the town closest to the epicenter, almost all houses were damaged. The whole town centre was heavily damaged. One elementary school was damaged. Roofs of the town hall and the Church of Saint Lawrence were destroyed. The entire village of Brest Pokupski near Petrinja was heavily damaged.

The city of Sisak, located roughly 20 km (12 mi) northeast of the epicenter, suffered major damage to its hospital, as well as its city hall. Despite the damage, the hospital was not shut down. Most damage was inflicted on old buildings in the center of the town. It is estimated that between 700 and 1,000 houses were damaged in Sisak and nearby villages.

In the village of Strašnik where the epicenter was located, as well as in the nearby village of Sibić, almost all houses were damaged. Part of the villages' populations were evacuated and tents with food and water were set up.

Majske Poljane is the village that suffered the most damage from the earthquake; all buildings were damaged and many collapsed. It is also the place with the largest number of deaths, out of seven total fatalities five were in Majske Poljane.

In Žažina, one church collapsed, injuring three and killing one other person.

Cover collapse sinkholes have started appearing since the earthquake near the villages of Mečenčani and Borojevići. As of March 2021, there were over 90 of them, some endangering homes. The largest hole was 12 metres (39 ft) deep and 25 m (82 ft) in diameter. While this area lies on karstic bedrock covered by a layer of proluvial soil and is ordinarily prone to occasional sinkholes, the quantity, size and location of the sinkholes has prompted the authorities to consider evacuating the villages. According to the geophysicists, the earthquake likely disrupted the underground water currents, accelerating the natural karstification. State company Hrvatske vode began remedying the sinkholes, but as of December 2021, new sinkholes were still appearing.

=== Zagreb County and City of Zagreb ===
In Pokupsko, which is roughly 20 km (12 mi) northwest of the epicenter, many buildings were damaged including a school, a kindergarten and an 18th-century church.

In the town of Zaprešić, which is roughly 60 km (37 mi) north-northwest of the epicenter, four residential buildings sustained damage, forcing more than 80 families to leave the town.

The city of Zagreb, which is roughly 50 km (31 mi) to the north of the epicenter, was affected with some building damage, power outages, and many residents taking to the streets in distress.

=== Bosnia and Herzegovina ===
Buildings were damaged in multiple towns across northwestern Bosnia and Herzegovina, in the Una-Sana Canton and northern Republika Srpska, which are roughly between 30 km (19 mi) and 90 km (56 mi) southwest, south, and southeast of the epicenter. Towns which were damaged include Velika Kladuša, Bihać, Cazin, Kozarska Dubica, and Kostajnica, which suffered the most damage from the earthquake. In Kostajnica, a state of emergency was declared, the earthquake caused six conflagrations, and many buildings were damaged, including the town hall, which was declared out of function.

=== Slovenia ===
Buildings were damaged in several areas and towns, mostly near the Slovenia–Croatia border. People reported damage to facades, roofs, and chimneys from the southeastern towns of Krško and Brežice and the old town of Kostanjevica na Krki, which lie roughly 70 km (43 mi) northwest of the epicenter. The Krško Nuclear Plant automatically shut down and was later systematically reviewed, with no damage reported. In northeastern Slovenia, roughly 125 km (78 mi) north-northwest of the epicenter, there were power and telecommunication outages in the area of its central town of Maribor, the municipal building in nearby Ptuj was damaged, and there was damage to the church in Sveta Trojica. In Ljubljana, the capital, a session of Parliament had to be stopped, and the interior of the Parliament building incurred minor damage. No injuries were recorded in the country.

=== Hungary ===
The quake was also felt strongly in many parts of Hungary. However, there was only limited damage recorded. In an old house in Egervár, small cracks appeared and plaster fell. In counties such as Baranya, Zala, Somogy and Tolna, damage consisted of fallen plaster, cracked walls and ceilings, broken windows and, toppled chimneys. Damage in the country is said to have exceeded 100 million forints.

=== Austria ===
The quake was felt throughout Austria. Like in Hungary, limited damage was also observed, mostly in the form of cracks on walls and plaster. In Austria, the quake was felt with a maximum intensity of IV (Largely observed) to V (Strong) on the European macroseismic scale.

=== Italy ===
Like with other countries, damage in Italy was limited, but in Trieste, near the border with Slovenia and Croatia, some buildings cracked.

== Casualties ==
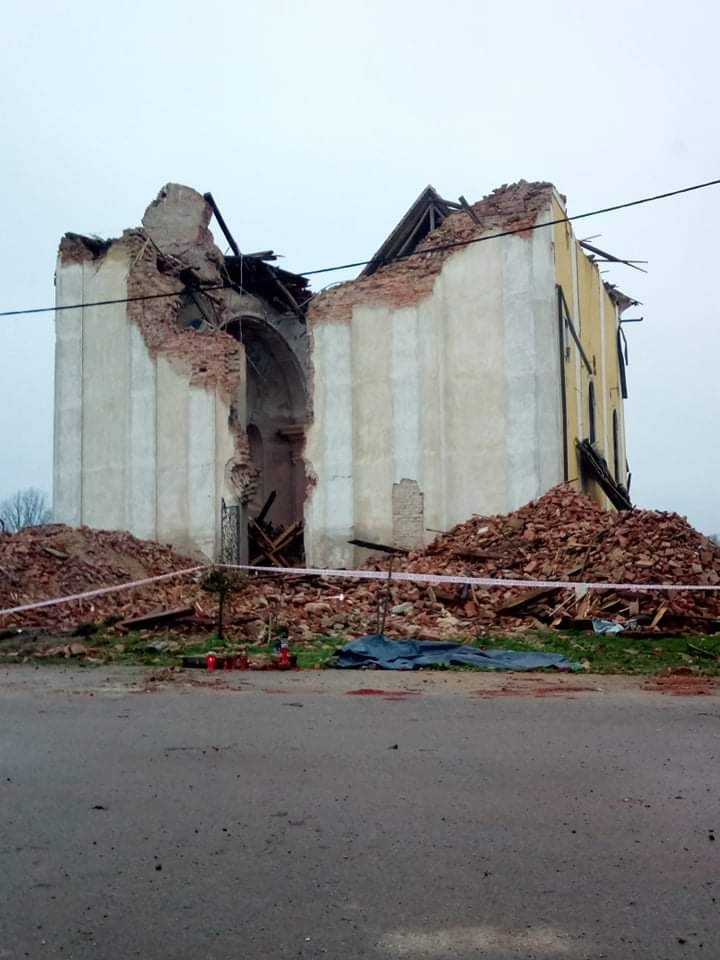
Church in Žažina after the earthquake

A total of 26 people were injured, with six having serious injuries. Initial reports showed many buildings destroyed in Petrinja.

A 13-year-old girl died and at least 20 others were injured in Petrinja. The town's mayor, Darinko Dumbović, was quoted stating that half of the town was destroyed. A 20-year-old man and his father were killed when their house collapsed in Majske Poljane near Glina. Three other people were later found dead in the same village. Majske Poljane was the hardest hit of all the settlements affected by the earthquake. One person was later found dead in Žažina after the local church collapsed.

On 3 January 2021, a volunteer rescue worker fell to his death from a building while he was repairing damage from the earthquake. Another worker died on 20 January, after a wall collapsed onto him while he was repairing a house in Sisak.

== International reactions ==
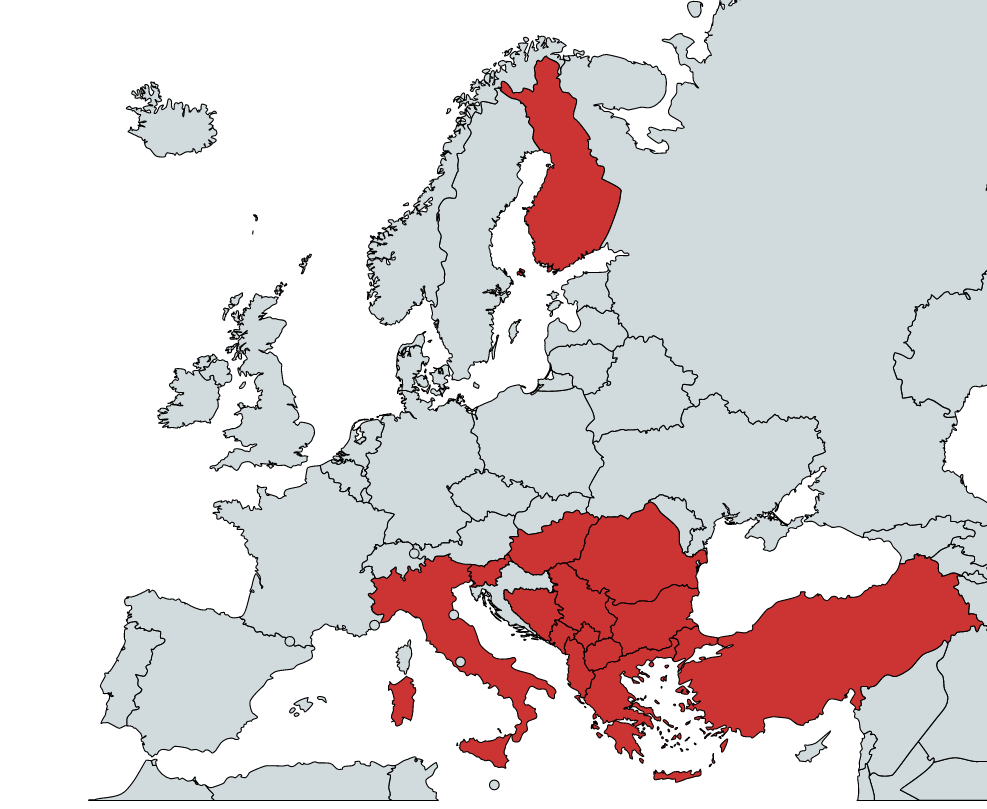
Countries that offered help to Croatia after the earthquake

=== Countries ===
- Albania – €250,000 were allocated by the Albanian government for humanitarian aid and future reconstruction of Petrinja.
- Bosnia and Herzegovina – The Ministry of Security offered the Croatian Ministry of the Interior – the Civil Protection Headquarters – assistance after the earthquake. The Bosnia and Herzegovina Ministry of Security, after consultations and coordination with institutions in Bosnia and Herzegovina and Croatia, made two protection and rescue teams available: the team of the Federal Civil Protection Administration with 42 rescuers, and the team of the Republic Civil Protection Administration of Republika Srpska with 18 rescuers, which will be sent to the affected area with their accompanying equipment if the aid is accepted by Croatia.
- Bulgaria – The Ministry of Foreign Affairs offered condolences of the behalf of the Bulgarian people and confirmed that the Government of Bulgaria will send €100,000 for the renovation of two buildings with significant cultural value for the Bulgarian people in Croatia. Also, Minister of Foreign Affairs Ekaterina Zakharieva stated that two of Bulgaria's largest producers of bottled water have expressed desire to help the people of Croatia.
- Finland – The Minister of Foreign Affairs Pekka Haavisto offered his condolences to the victims and stated that Finland has offered assistance through the EU Civil Protection Mechanism.
- Greece – Prime Minister Kyriakos Mitsotakis offered his condolences to the victims' families while affirming that the Greek General Secretariat for Civil Protection is ready to assist.
- Hungary – Prime Minister Viktor Orbán offered help in disaster mitigation and reconstruction in a letter to his Croatian counterpart.
- Italy – Prime Minister Giuseppe Conte said on Twitter that Italy is ready to provide Croatia with all assistance and help needed.
- Kosovo – Acting President Vjosa Osmani and Acting Prime Minister Avdullah Hoti offered to send search and rescue teams of their armed forces to Croatia to help where needed.
- Montenegro – President Milo Đukanović said that Montenegro is ready to help Croatia. Dritan Abazović, the Deputy Prime Minister of Montenegro, added that Croatia can expect Montenegro to provide any help it needs.
- North Macedonia – Prime Minister Zoran Zaev announced that his cabinet came to a decision to send 6,000,000 Macedonian denars (€100,000) to Croatia.
- Romania – The Department for Emergency Situations (DSU) showed their willingness to intervene and provide support to the Croatian authorities. DSU search and rescue teams declared readiness to intervene in Croatia on the basis of the request for assistance made by the Croatian government. Raed Arafat, head of the Emergency Situations Department, requested that the RO-USAR (Romanian – Urban Search and Rescue) teams be prepared to intervene. On 30 December, Prime Minister Florin Cîțu announced that his cabinet approved a decision to send approximately €131,500 worth of aid through the DSU and the National Administration of State Reserves, consisting of living containers, tents, beds, mattresses, and sleeping bags.
- Serbia – President Aleksandar Vučić announced that Serbia is ready to help Croatia both financially and technically. The next day, the Government of Serbia decided to donate €1,000,000 to Croatia for repairing the damage from the earthquake. A group of Serbian citizens from Belgrade gathered in front of the Croatian embassy as a sign of support. Serbian Chamber of Commerce donated additional €50,000.
- Slovenia – Prime Minister Janez Janša offered to send tents, beds, and heaters to help take care of those who lost their homes during the earthquake; he also offered to send experts for damage assessment.
- Turkey – President Recep Tayyip Erdoğan, in phone calls to his Croatian counterpart Zoran Milanović, extended his condolences to Croatia over the magnitude 6.4 earthquake. Erdoğan also stated that Turkey is ready to provide search and rescue teams and all other help that may be needed.

=== International organizations ===
- European Union – President of the European Commission Ursula von der Leyen said that the European Union is ready to support the country and that she asked Janez Lenarčič, the European Commissioner for Crisis Management, to travel to Croatia.
- UEFA – President of UEFA Aleksander Čeferin donated €50,000 on behalf of the organization. UEFA also organized a charity match between Croatia and Slovenia legends in the city, that was played on 13 March 2021 with Slovenia coming from behind to beat Croatia 2–1.

== Aftermath ==
The earthquake prompted a preventive shutdown of the Krško Nuclear Power Plant in Slovenia, roughly 100 km (62 mi) away. The Paks Nuclear Power Plant in Hungary, roughly 300 km (190 mi) away, also felt the earthquake, but did not cease electricity production.

On 30 December, restrictions on entering and leaving the country were lifted for humanitarian purposes and for earthquake victims. The e-pass system due to COVID-19 which was in place since late December was also cancelled for the same reasons. The tolls on the A11 motorway connecting the region to Zagreb were temporarily lifted. Travel on the motorway remained free as of December 2025.

Croatia declared 2 January 2021 a national day of mourning in honor of the victims of this earthquake.

The first multidisciplinary scientific paper on Petrinja 2020 earthquake was published in Remote Sensing journal in March 2021.

By the end of 2021, the state authorities in Croatia were still failing to significantly advance reconstruction of numerous towns and villages. Humanitarians like Branka Bakšić Mitić, who is also vice-mayor of Glina, kept informing media of terrible living conditions and despair of people of living in the area.

On 11 January 2023, Prime Minister of Croatia Andrej Plenković announced that he will dismiss Ivan Paladina, Minister of Construction, Spatial Planning and State Property and Gordan Hanžek, Director of the Central State Office for Reconstruction and Housing, citing the need to greatly accelerate the reconstruction process.

== See also ==
- 2019 Albania earthquake
- 2020 Zagreb earthquake
- List of earthquakes 2011–2020
- List of earthquakes in 2020
- List of earthquakes in 2021
- List of earthquakes in Croatia
