= 2020 Zagreb earthquake =

- Potres u Zagreb 2020.
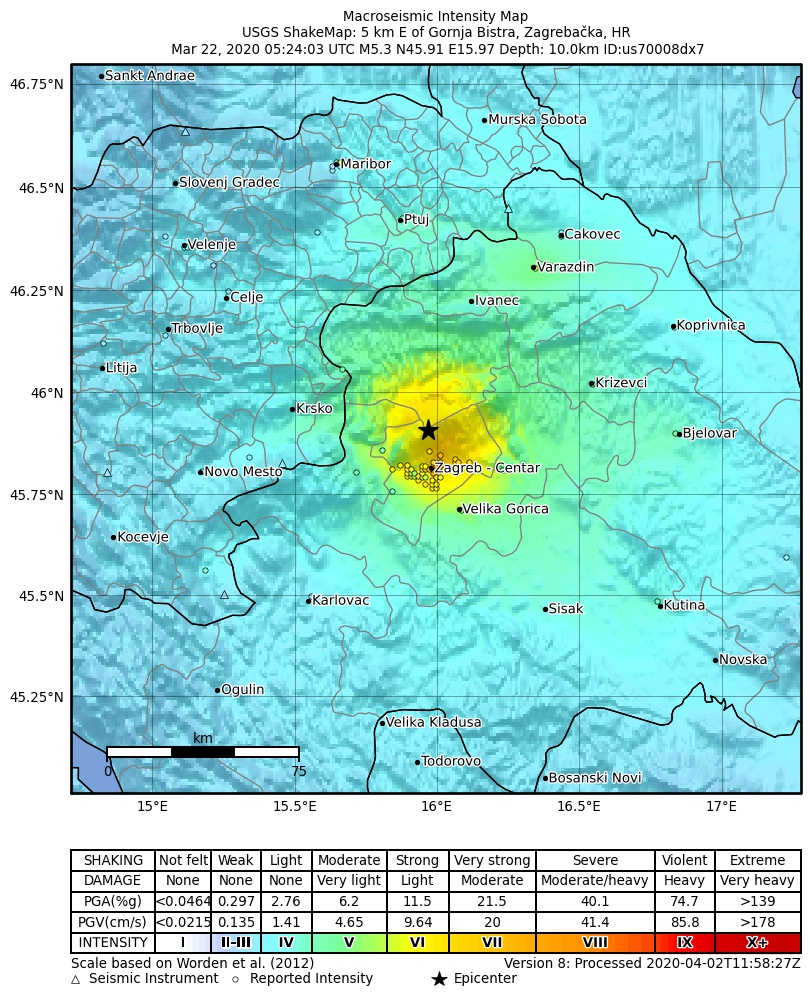
- Map of central Croatia, showing location and intensity of shaking. Star marks epicentre.

- Location within Croatia
- UTC time: 2020-03-22 05:24:03
- ISC event: 617810109
- USGS-ANSS: ComCat
- Local date: 22 March 2020
- Local time: 6:24 a.m. CET (UTC+1)
- Magnitude: 5.3 M_{w} 5.5 M_{L}
- Depth: 10 km (6.2 mi)
- Epicenter: 45.85°N 16.03°E
- Type: Reverse fault
- Areas affected: Croatia, southern Slovenia
- Total damage: €11.5 billion ($11.7 billion USD)
- Max. intensity: MSK-64 VIII (Damaging)
- Aftershocks: 145 (by 14 April); 9 with a 3.0 M_{w} or greater Largest: 5.0 M_{w} at 6:01 UTC, 22 March 2020
- Casualties: 2 fatalities (1 indirect), 26 injuries

At approximately 6:24 AM CET on the morning of 22 March 2020, an earthquake of magnitude 5.3 M_{w}, 5.5 M_{L}, hit Zagreb, Croatia, with an epicenter 7 kilometres (4.3 mi) north of the city centre. The maximum felt intensity was VII–VIII (Very strong to Damaging) on the Medvedev–Sponheuer–Karnik scale. The earthquake was followed by numerous aftershocks, the strongest of which with a magnitude of 5.0. It was the strongest earthquake in Zagreb since the 1880 earthquake and caused substantial damage in the historical city center. More than 1,900 buildings were reported to have been damaged to the point of becoming uninhabitable. The earthquake was also felt in Slovenia. At least 27 people were injured by the earthquake, including a teenage girl who later died from injuries caused by falling debris on 23 March. Four days later, a construction worker fell to his death after attempting to repair a building damaged by the earthquake.

The earthquake occurred during the coronavirus pandemic and complicated the enforcement of social distancing measures set out by the Government of Croatia. It occurred during the Croatian Presidency of the Council of the European Union.

The direct earthquake damage inflicted on Zagreb and Krapina-Zagorje County was estimated at 86 billion Croatian kuna (€11.5 billion).

== Geology ==
Zagreb lies just to the south of the mountain of Medvednica. The northern edge of the mountain is formed by a major southeast–dipping reverse fault that has been active during the Quaternary, the North Medvednica Fault. Earthquakes in this area involve reverse movement on west-southwest–east-northeast trending faults or strike-slip faulting on either northwest–southeast (dextral) or west-southwest–east-northeast (sinistral) faults.

== Earthquake ==
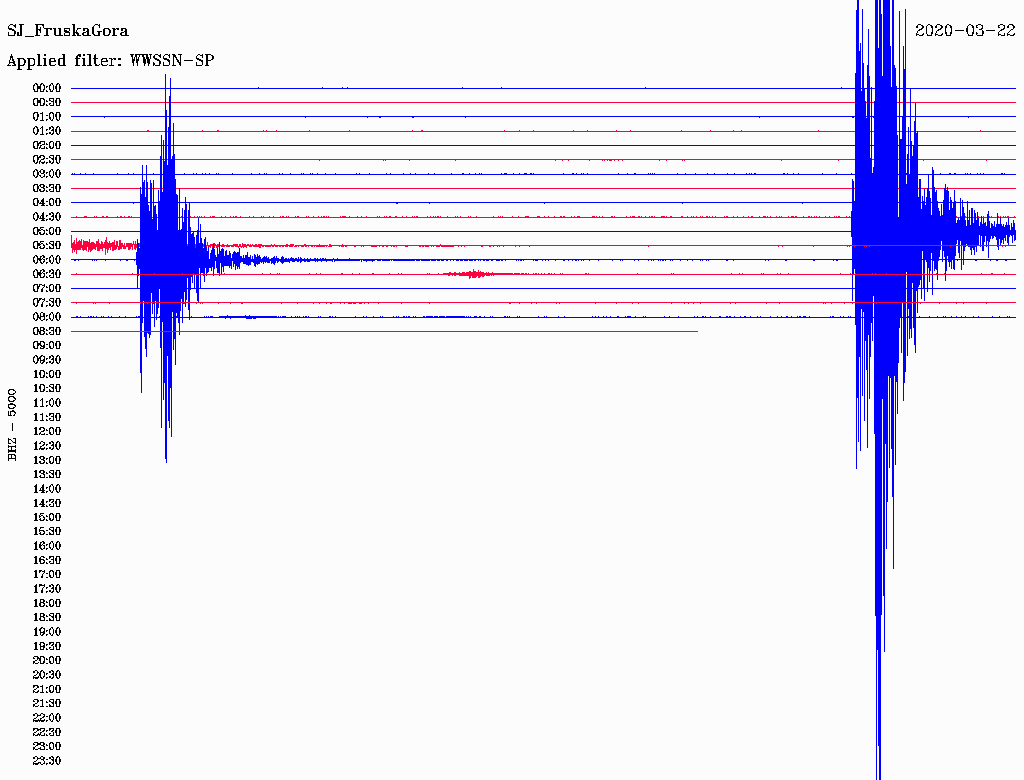
Seismogram of the Zagreb earthquake.

The earthquake had a magnitude of 5.3 M_{w} and a depth of 10 kilometres (6.2 mi) according to Advanced National Seismic System and 5.5 M_{L} according to the Seismological Service of Croatia. The maximum perceived intensity was VII (very strong) to VIII (damaging) on the Medvedev–Sponheuer–Karnik scale (MSK) and VII (Damaging) on the European macroseismic scale (EMS-98). It was the strongest earthquake in Zagreb since the earthquake in 1880.

The earthquake's epicentre was located in the northern suburbs of the Croatian capital Zagreb, in the Medvednica nature park, with the closest neighborhoods including Markuševec and Vidovec (in the Podsljeme city district), Čučerje (in the Gornja Dubrava district) and Kašina (in the Sesvete district).

The focal mechanism of the earthquake indicates reverse faulting on a west-southwest–east-northeast trending fault. This is consistent with movement on a structure associated with the North Medvednica Fault.

=== Aftershocks ===
More than 30 aftershocks were recorded within seven hours of the main tremor, with over 100 aftershocks associated with the earthquake, however, most were weaker than 2.0 magnitude. By 14 April, 145 aftershocks greater than or equal to 1.3 M_{w} and 850 below 1.3 M_{w} were detected following the earthquake, among which 8 were reported to be of magnitude 3.0 or greater with the largest being a 5.0 M_{w} event at 6:01 UTC according to the Seismological Service of Croatia. After a period of lower seismic activity, several lower intensity earthquakes were recorded in June 2020.

Raw data

Aftershocks of M_{w} 3.0 or greater
Date	Time (UTC)	M	MMI	Depth	Ref.
22 March	05:32	3.0	III-IV	10.0 km (6.2 mi)	
22 March	05:35	3.0	III-IV	10.0 km (6.2 mi)	
22 March	06:01	5.0	VI	10.0 km (6.2 mi)	
22 March	06:41	3.4	IV-V	10.0 km (6.2 mi)	
22 March	08:04	3.0	III-IV	10.0 km (6.2 mi)	
22 March	09:11	3.0	III-IV	10.0 km (6.2 mi)	
23 March	10:12	3.3	IV-V	10.0 km (6.2 mi)	
24 March	19:53	3.2	IV	10.0 km (6.2 mi)	
23 April	07:52	3.2	IV	10.0 km (6.2 mi)	
17 June	17:51	3.1	V	10.0 km (6.2 mi)	
20 April 2021	21:15	3.0	IV	10.0 km (6.2 mi)	

== Response ==
President Zoran Milanović, Prime Minister Andrej Plenković, and Mayor Milan Bandić gave statements, and urged citizens who left their homes to keep a distance due to the ongoing coronavirus pandemic. The Hospital for Infectious Diseases briefly ceased with coronavirus testing, which resumed later during the day. The Ministry of Defence mobilized the army to help clear debris from the streets. Citizens whose homes were critically damaged were accommodated in a student dorm. On the following day, Mayor Bandić declared a state of natural disaster.

On 22 March, European Council President Charles Michel extended a message of support to Croatia, saying the European Union is willing to help after strong quakes hit Zagreb this morning. The European Commissioner for Crisis Management Janez Lenarčič said that the Emergency Response Coordination Centre was in contact with Croatia's authorities.

On 24 March, it was announced that the players of Croatia national football team had donated 4,200,000 Croatian kuna to the relief efforts. On 25 March, it was announced that the members of the Government, as well as United States Ambassador to Croatia Robert Kohorst, had given up on their March paychecks for the benefit of the victims. The Speaker of the Parliament Gordan Jandroković invited the members of the Parliament to do the same. The same day, GNK Dinamo Zagreb donated 250,000 kuna to the Clinic for Children's Diseases Zagreb and the University Hospital Centre Zagreb, respectively.

On 27 March, five days after the earthquake, measures to prevent the spread of the pandemic were reduced to allow the opening of shops selling construction tools and materials, in order to allow Zagreb residents to repair earthquake damage. Starting with the following day, parking was temporarily made free in some of the affected neighbourhoods.

Željko Kolar, the Prefect of the Krapina-Zagorje County, declared a state of natural disaster for the town of Donja Stubica and the municipalities of Gornja Stubica and Marija Bistrica. After visiting the region, Plenković said that the damage from the earthquake is far more extensive than originally believed. The Ministry of Defence deployed 50 military drones to document the damage.

=== Funding for repairs ===
Zagreb's administration initially stated that according to the applicable law, it would pay for up to 5 percent of repair costs for uninsured properties whose damage exceeded 60 percent of their value, which was the upper limit according to the law. Mayor Bandić said that 95 percent of the damage incurred by buildings in Zagreb's central areas could have been prevented by a façade renovation project for which, he said, he had been unable to find support. The following day, on 26 March, Minister of Construction and Physical Planning Predrag Štromar announced amendments to the law and a special fund to help Zagreb, in agreement with Mayor Bandić. Croatian Prime Minister Plenković met with Mayor Bandić on 30 March to discuss the consequences of the earthquake. Bandić said that the city cannot pay for repairs to private property, and that the "cause [of damage] is neglect of personal property", adding that "those who invested in their property did fine." The opposition criticised his statements as placing blame for the earthquake damage on homeowners.

Due to snow, rain and cold weather in the days immediately following the earthquake, some of the residents took to repairing their homes on their own shortly after the earthquake. On 30 March, Ministry of Construction and Spatial Planning announced it would finance repairs to damaged houses and flats.

On 3 April, citizens of Zagreb, dissatisfied with Mayor Bandić's management of the city in the crisis situation, banged pots on their balconies at 7:00 PM CEST protesting under the initiative "Resign, it's your fault, it's been enough". The action was repeated on 17 April. The organisers demanded housing for those rendered homeless by the earthquake, a "fair, transparent and speedy" renovation of the city, and that the city take advice from construction industry associations. These actions were a continuation of ongoing protests against Mayor Bandić which were stopped due to the coronavirus pandemic.

Minister Štromar presented a draft of a law for the renovation of the damaged structures. The draft was criticised for suspending the regulation of public tenders, not financing the repairs of structures whose owners own another property, requiring the residents to pay rent on flats offered as a temporary replacement, and lacking the qualifications to ensure that future earthquakes of the same strength will cause less damage.

A state inquiry in the City of Zagreb budget found that the city was 1.9 billion kuna in debt (€250 million), and that the natural disaster fund had been "wasted" on various associations, religious community projects and festivities. Among other irregularities found, the income from monument annuities, collected from owners of buildings deemed worthy of preservation, was to be spent on projects renovating said buildings, but at the time of the revision, none of the renovation contracts had been closed.

== Damage ==
26,197 buildings are reported to have sustained damage, 1,900 of which are unusable. Some neighbourhoods were left without electricity and heat, and in some areas without internet. The earthquake caused several fires. Most of the damaged buildings were built in the 18th and 19th centuries, well before a 1964 law, following the disastrous Skopje earthquake, which mandated that earthquake protection must be taken into account during the design and construction of buildings. In particular, buildings made from reinforced concrete – which was introduced as a construction technique in Zagreb in the 1930s – withstood the earthquake with negligible damage.

The hardest hit were the older buildings in the historic centre of Zagreb. One of the spires of Zagreb Cathedral broke off and fell on the Archbishop's Palace. The Basilica of the Heart of Jesus was heavily damaged. A part of the roof of the Croatian Parliament building collapsed and the sessions of the Parliament were suspended. The Banski dvori, which houses the Croatian government, sustained only minor damage.

Most of the museums in the city's centre were damaged by the earthquake, including the Museum of Arts and Crafts, the Croatian History Museum, and the Schools Museum. The director of the Croatian History Museum said that their building is no longer statically safe. The Croatian News Agency building was severely damaged, but it continued to operate and provide services to clients. The Kolmar building on Ban Jelačić Square, which housed the Croatian Writers' Association, lost one of its cupolas during the earthquake and the other had to be pulled down by firefighters as it was badly damaged. Two buildings of the Komedija Theatre reported significant damage. Other theaters, including the 1895 Croatian National Theatre, suffered no major damage. Minor damage was also registered on the Faculty of Law, the Croatian Music Institute, and the Orthodox Cathedral.

The city's largest maternity hospital, the obstetrics department of the University Hospital Centre in Petrova Street, was evacuated. Also, 23 elementary schools, 2 secondary schools, 20 university faculties, and 18 institutes reported damage. In Donja Stubica, Gornja Stubica, and Marija Bistrica 53 houses were completely destroyed and the total damage is estimated at more than 75 million kuna.

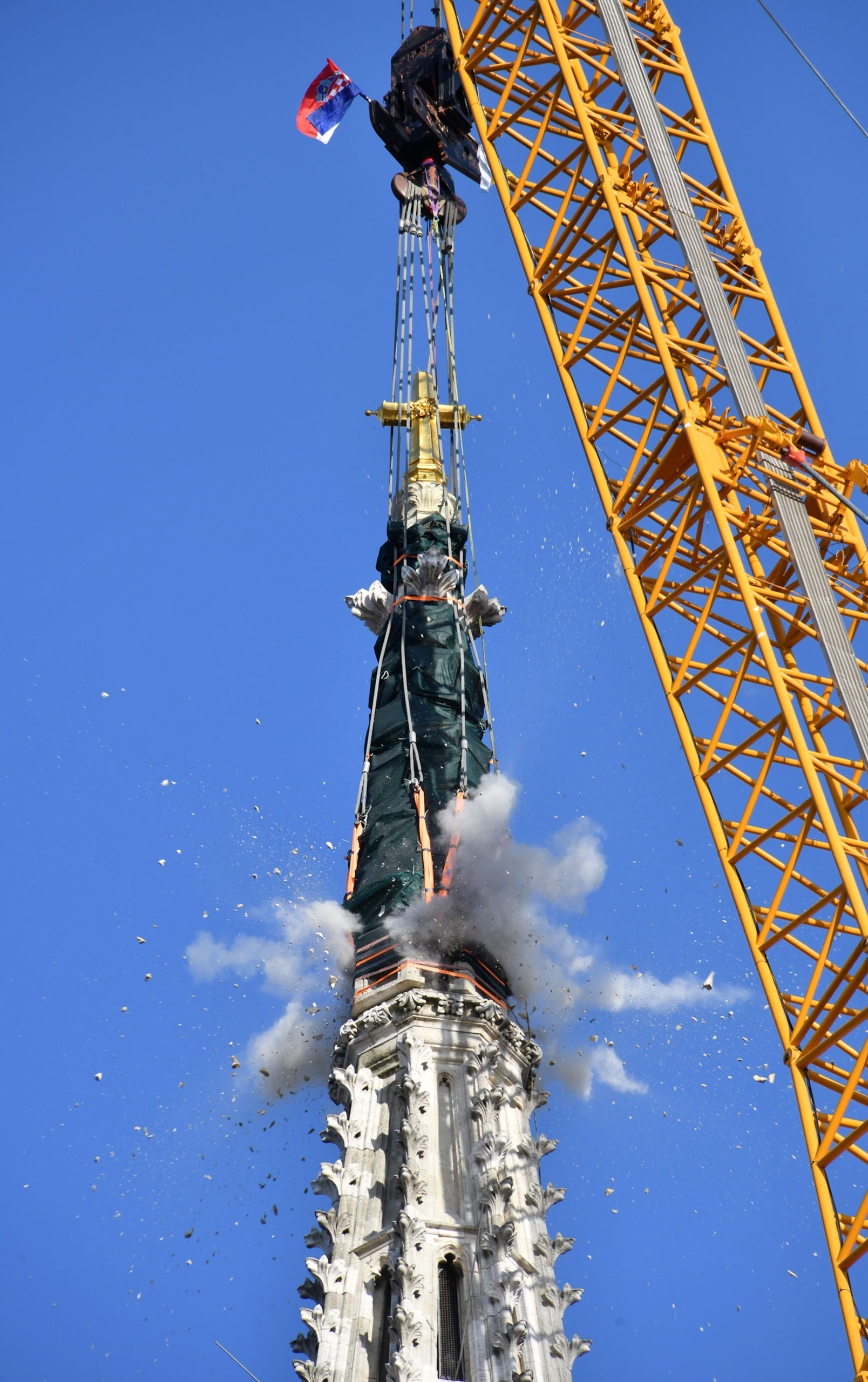
On 17 April, explosive charges were used to remove the northern spire of Zagreb Cathedral.

The nearby Krško Nuclear Power Plant, in Slovenia, sustained no damage and continued to operate normally. A 3-metre-wide (10 ft) sinkhole opened on the grounds of the Stubičke Toplice Special Medical Rehabilitation Hospital after the earthquake.

Four Internet autonomous systems in Croatia had gone offline as a consequence of the earthquake, causing the disruptions in Internet access, but connectivity was restored by the next day.

On 17 April, the northern spire of Zagreb Cathedral was removed due to leaning during the earthquake.

Minister Štromar presented an estimate by the Civil Engineering Faculty in Zagreb on the total damage from the earthquake. According to the estimate, the damage in Zagreb and the surrounding area is around 42 billion kuna, or 5.6 billion euros. The figure was later revised to 86 billion kuna or €11.5 billion.

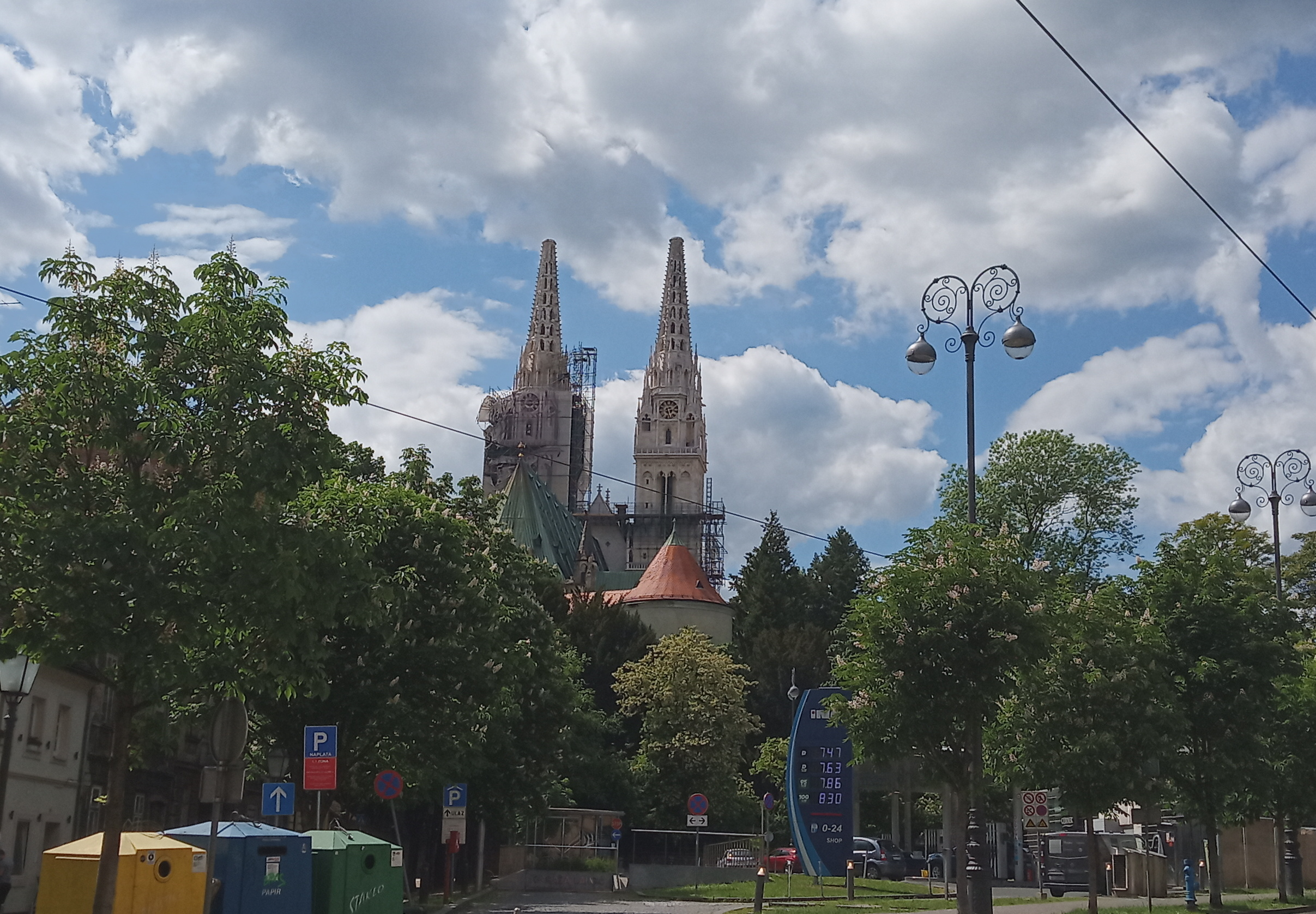
Zagreb cathedral lacking its spires.

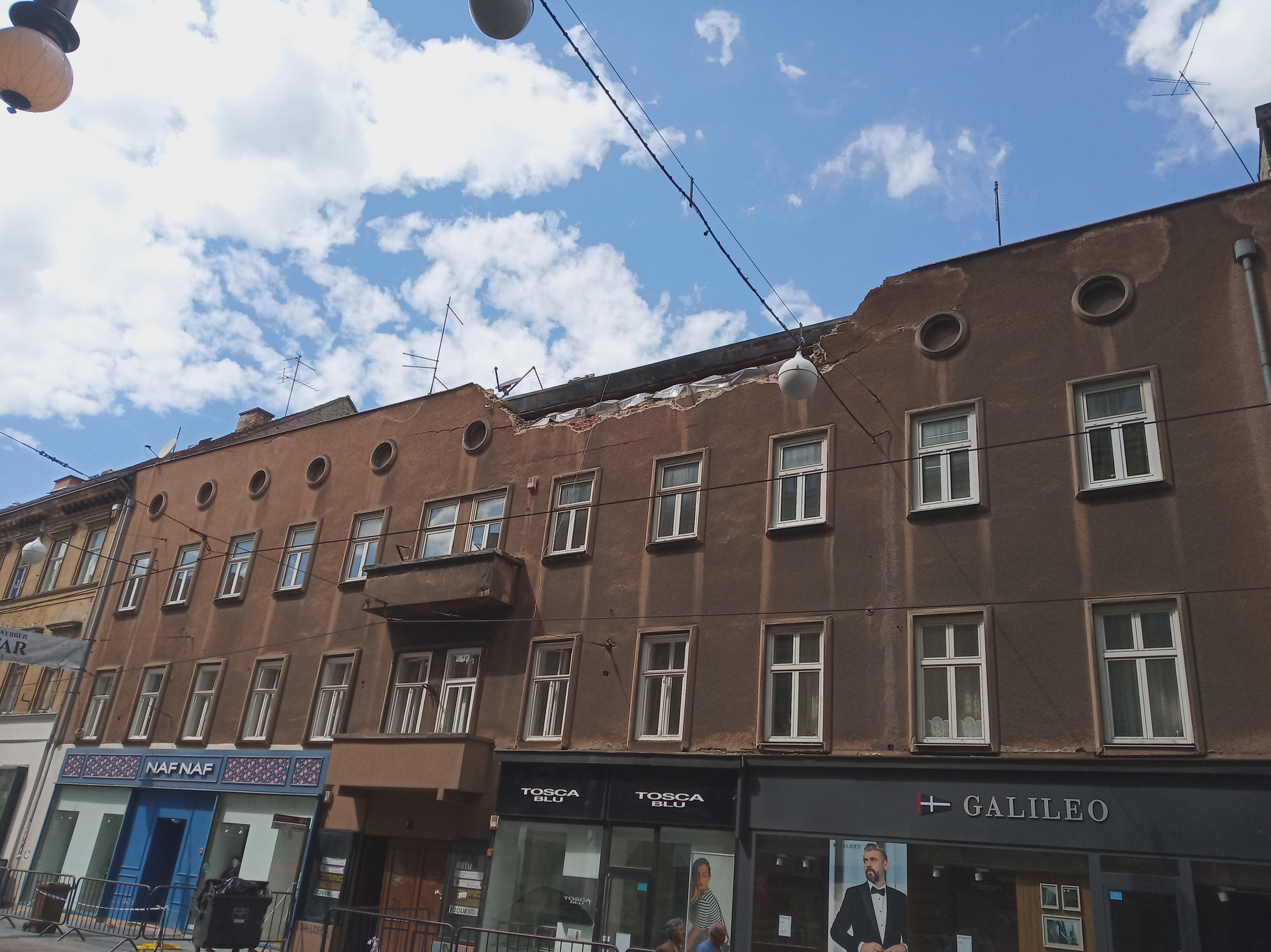
A building in Ilica Street damaged by the earthquake.

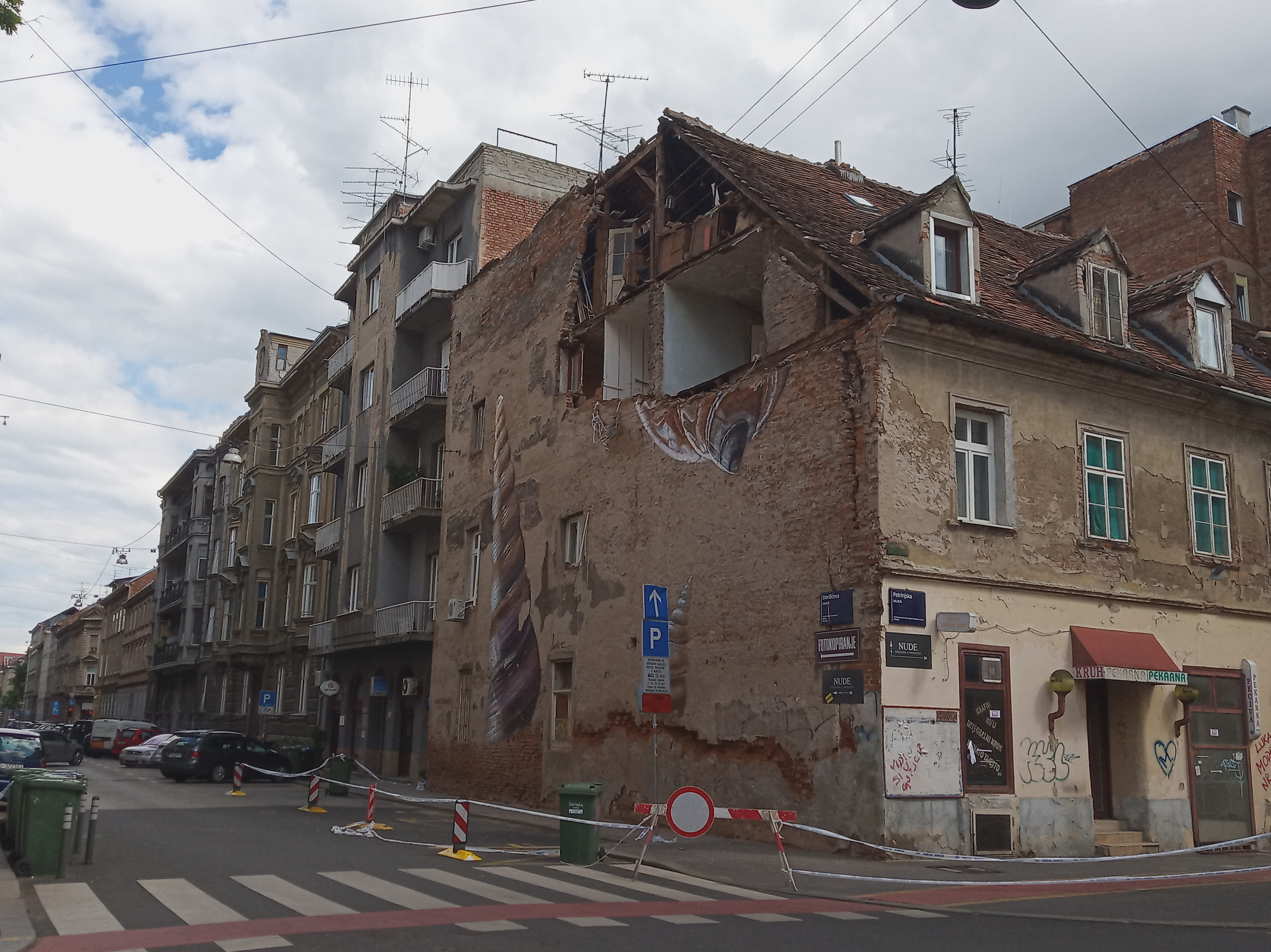
Destroyed building in Đorđićeva Street.

== Casualties ==
Seventeen people were reported injured on 22 March, with a 15-year-old girl in critical condition. Three people were injured in the Krapina-Zagorje County, 11 in Zagreb and three in the Zagreb County. On the next day ten more injuries were reported, making a total of 27 people injured. On 23 March, the 15-year-old girl from Zagreb, who was in critical condition, died, succumbing to her injuries. She is the first recorded victim of the earthquake.

On 27 March, a volunteer construction worker fell to his death from a building while he was repairing damage from the earthquake.

== European assistance ==
Eight European countries have offered assistance for relief:

- Serbia donated one million euros.
- Austria sent 100 five-person winter tents, 100 lighting kits for tents, 800 camp beds, and 200 sleeping bags for adults.
- Bosnia and Herzegovina – The Government of the Herzegovina-Neretva Canton donated 100,000 KM (€51,129).
- European Union — Croatia activated the Civil Protection Mechanism on the day of the earthquake. EU's Copernicus Programme provided help in mapping the affected areas.
- France sent three ten-person tents, 120 beds, and 120 sleeping bags.
- Hungary sent 200 camp beds with mattresses.
- Italy sent 26 self-inflating tents and 1,000 groundsheets.
- Lithuania sent 21 eight-person tents, 21 electric heaters, 200 sleeping bags, and 200 camp beds.
- Montenegro sent 30 four-person tents, 200 electric heaters, 250 sleeping bags, 200 blankets, and 100 groundsheets for sleeping bags. The city of Kotor allocated €5,000.
- Slovenia sent 60 camp beds and sleeping bags, 20 electric heaters for S2 tents and ten eight-person winter tents.

== Aftermath ==
The first scientific paper on the Zagreb earthquake was published on 1 July 2020, in the scientific journal Geosciences.

Some of the buildings affected by the earthquake suffered further damage in the 24–25 July flash flood, including the Children's Hospital Zagreb in Klaić Street, the University of Zagreb Faculty of Science administrative building, and a number of public libraries.

In December the same year, Zagreb was further damaged by an M_{w} 6.4 earthquake whose epicenter was near Petrinja, 50 km (31 mi) from the capital.

== See also ==
- 2020s in environmental history
- List of earthquakes in 2020
- List of earthquakes in Croatia
- 2020 Petrinja earthquake
