= 1880 Zagreb earthquake =

Strong earthquake in Croatia

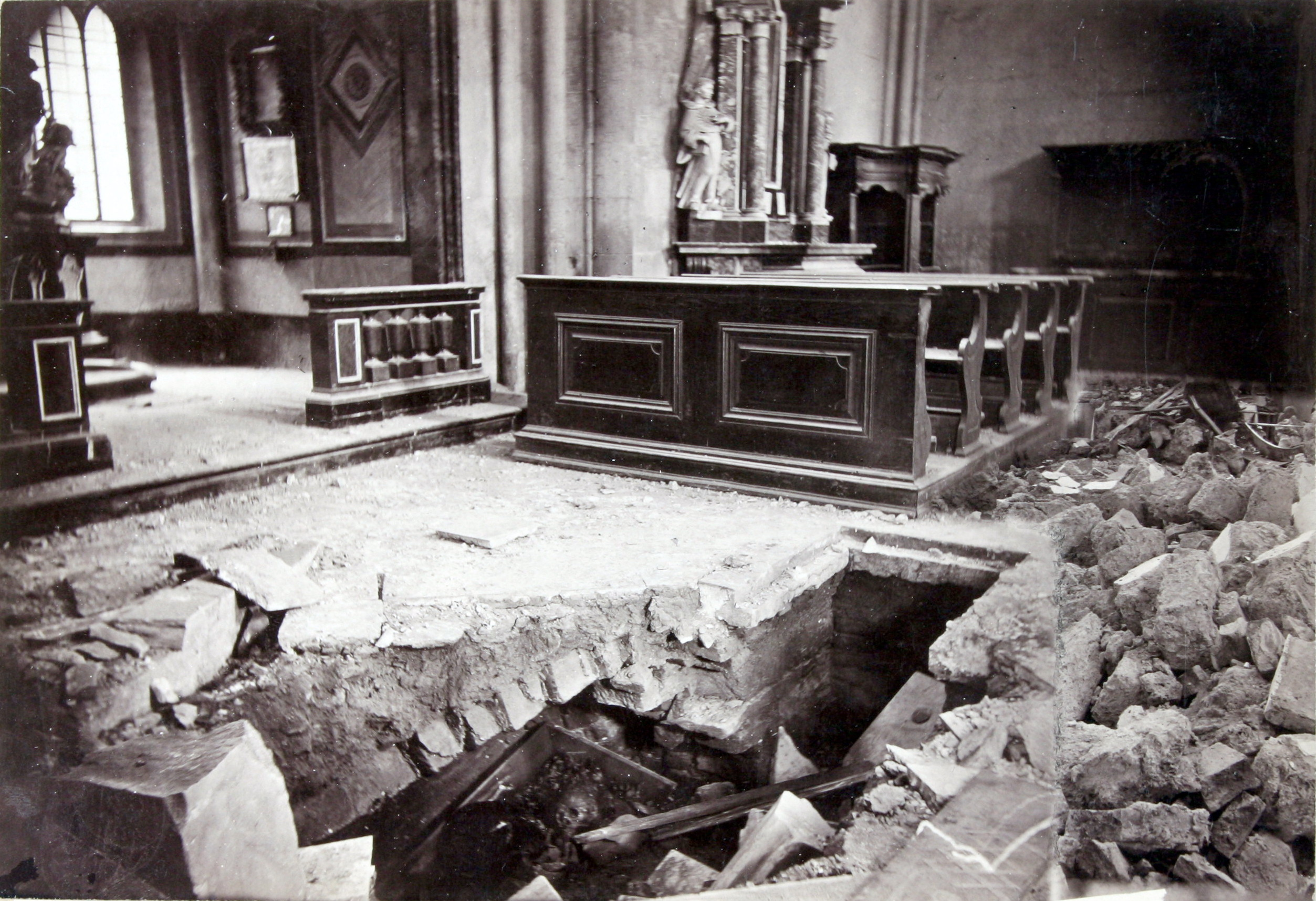
- The damage to Zagreb Cathedral's interior was photographed by Ivan Standl. A skeleton is visible in a crypt

- Location within Croatia
- Local date: 9 November 1880
- Local time: 07:33
- Magnitude: 6.3 M_{L}
- Epicenter: 45.90°N 16.10°E
- Fault: Medvednica Fault Zone
- Areas affected: Zagreb, Kingdom of Croatia-Slavonia, Austria-Hungary
- Max. intensity: EMS-98 VIII (Heavily damaging) – EMS-98 IX (Destructive)
- Casualties: 1 dead, 29 seriously injured

The 1880 earthquake which struck Zagreb, and is also known as The Great Zagreb earthquake, occurred with a moment magnitude of 6.3 on 9 November 1880. Its epicenter was in the Medvednica mountain north of Zagreb. Although only one person was killed in the earthquake, it destroyed or damaged many buildings and spurred a renovation program in the city's historic center. It remained the most severe quake to hit the city for 140 years, until the 2020 Zagreb earthquake.

== Events ==
According to the Zagreb Meteorological Station data, the earthquake struck at 07:33 AM CET and was followed by a series of tremors of smaller intensity. Contemporary records say that 3,800 outgoing tickets were sold at the Zagreb Main Station within the first 24 hours of the initial earthquake, as many locals sought to leave the city for Vienna, Ljubljana, Graz, and other Austro-Hungarian cities in the vicinity of Zagreb.

City authorities formed a commission to assess the damage, and their official report said that a total of 1,758 buildings were affected (not counting churches and state-owned buildings), out of which 485 were heavily damaged.

The Zagreb-based Yugoslav Academy of Sciences and Arts (JAZU) commissioned a survey of damaged buildings by prominent local photographer Ivan Standl.

The most prominent building damaged was Zagreb Cathedral, which then underwent a thorough reconstruction led by Hermann Bollé. However, the damage brought by the earthquake spurred construction and many historic buildings in the Lower Town area of the city were built in the following years.

== In art ==
Višnja Stahuljak wrote a historical novel Potres ("Earthquake") about the earthquake.

== See also ==
- 2020 Zagreb earthquake
- List of earthquakes in Croatia
- List of historical earthquakes

== Bibliography ==
- Horvat, Rudolf (1992). Prošlost grada Zagreba (in Croatian). Zagreb: August Cesarec. pp. 66–71. ISBN 978-86-393-0267-2.
- Kozák, J.; Cermák, V. (2010), "Zagreb (Agram) Earthquake, Croatia, 1880", The illustrated history of natural disasters, pp. 151–153, doi:10.1007/978-90-481-3325-3_33, ISBN 978-90-481-3324-6
