= Sisak =

City in central Croatia

- City
- Grad Sisak; City of Sisak
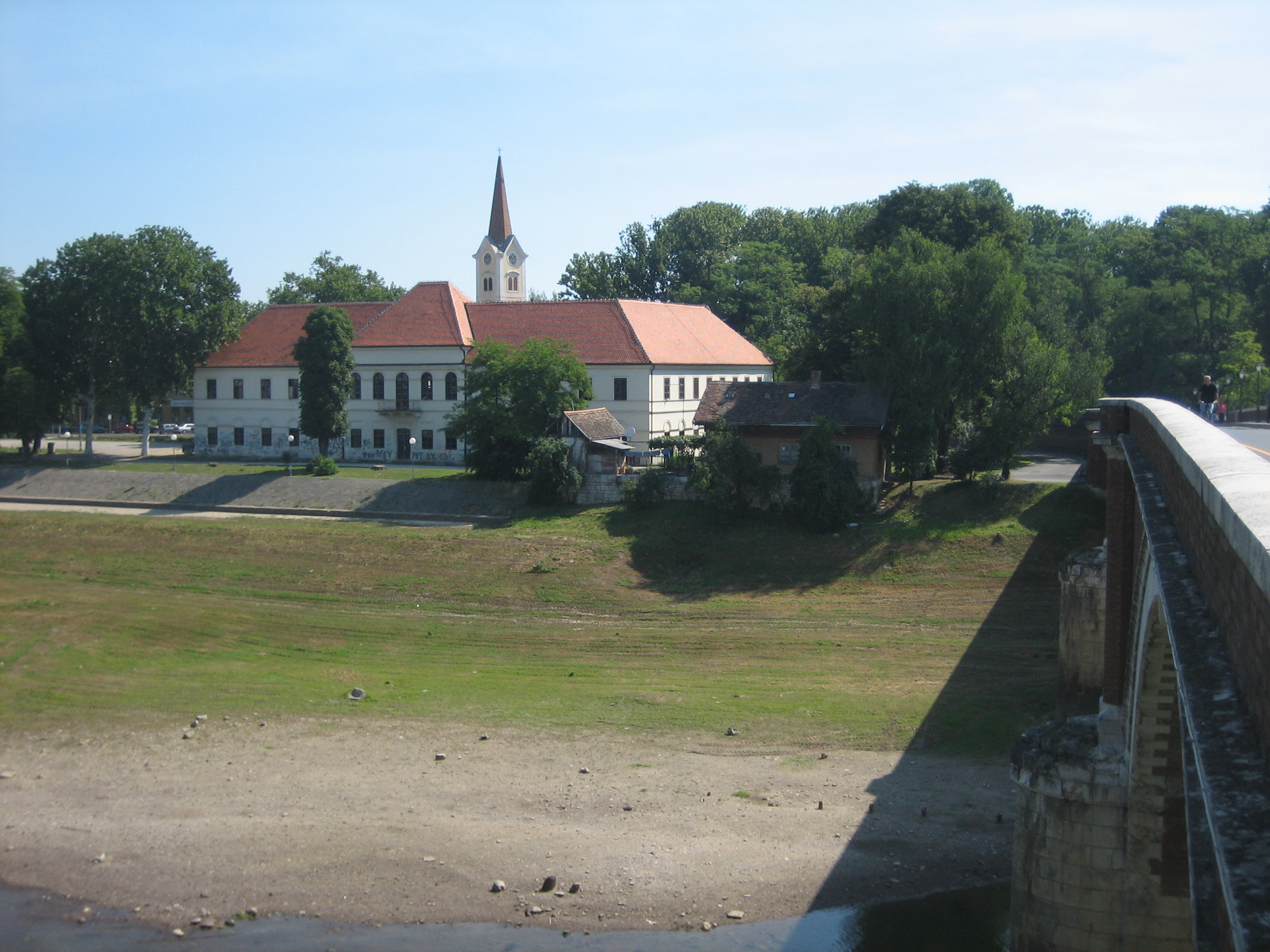
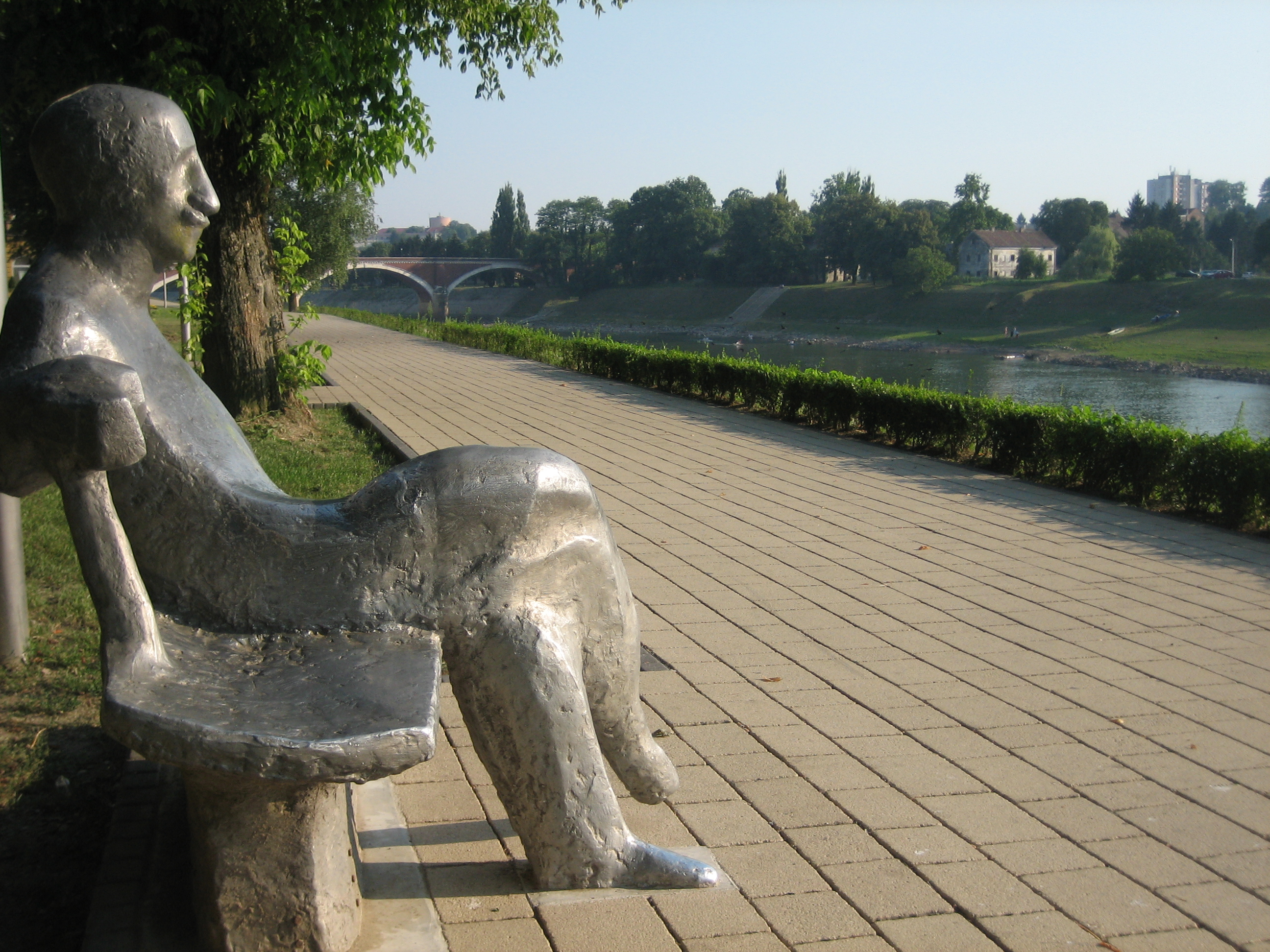
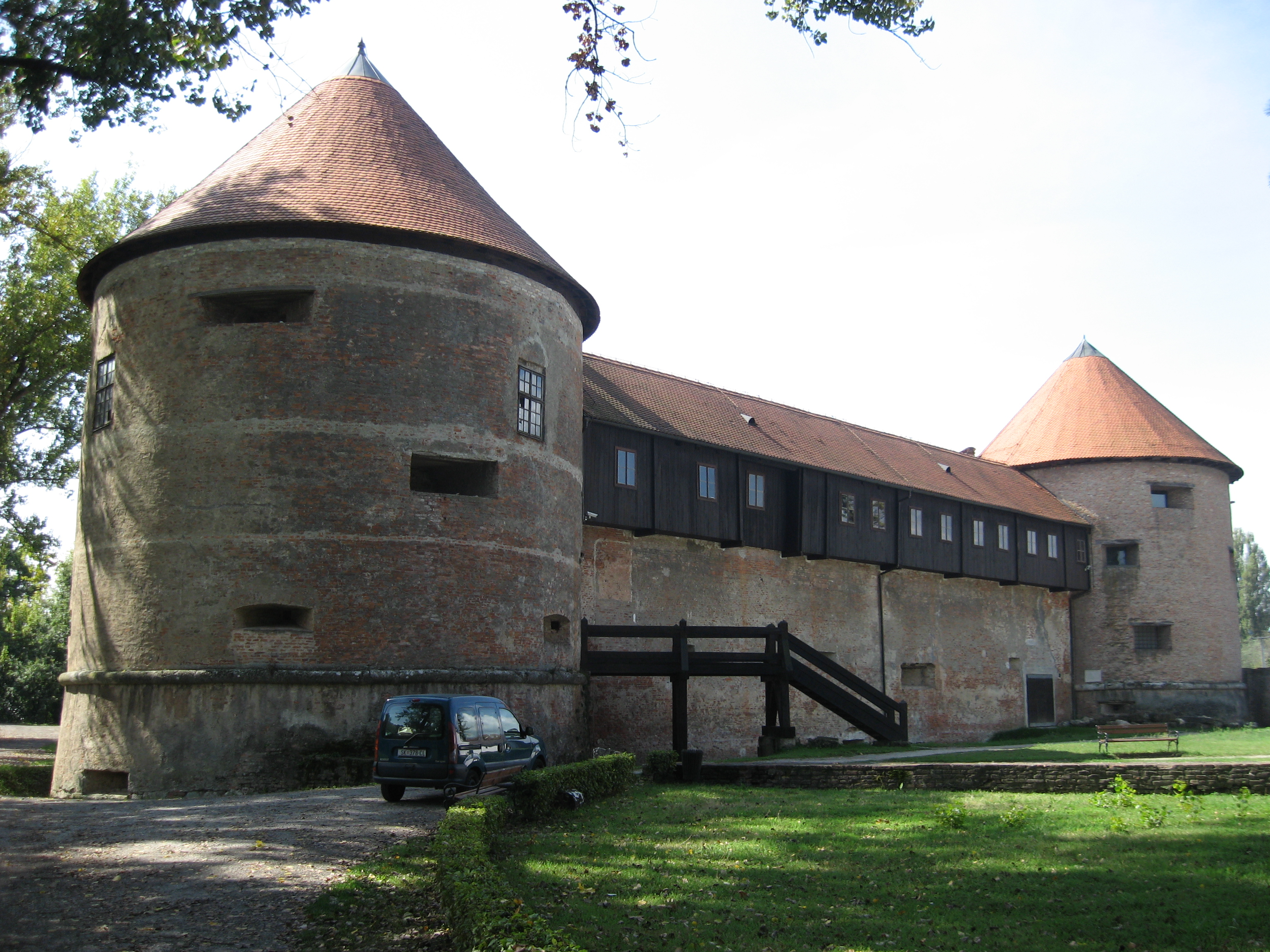
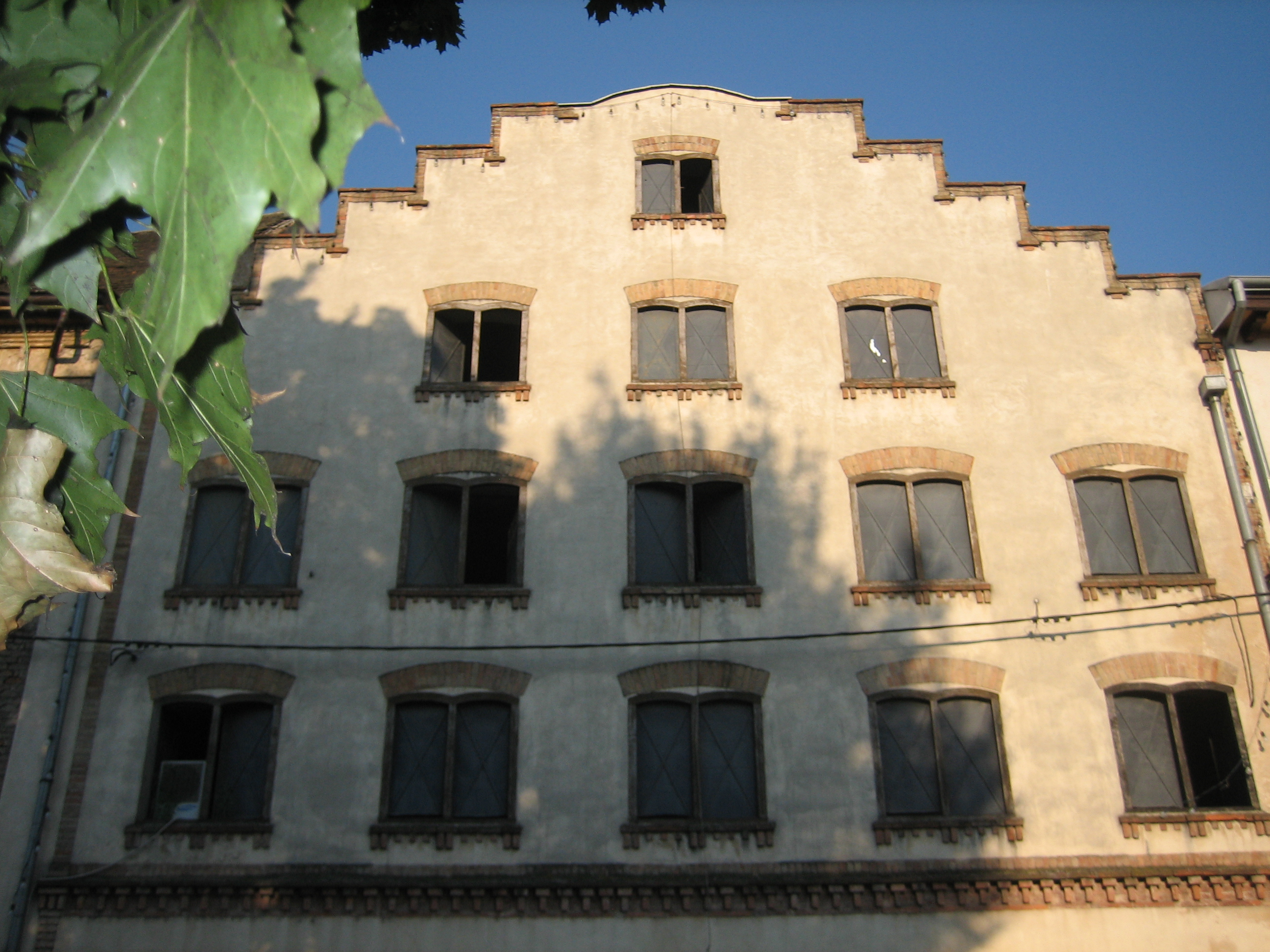
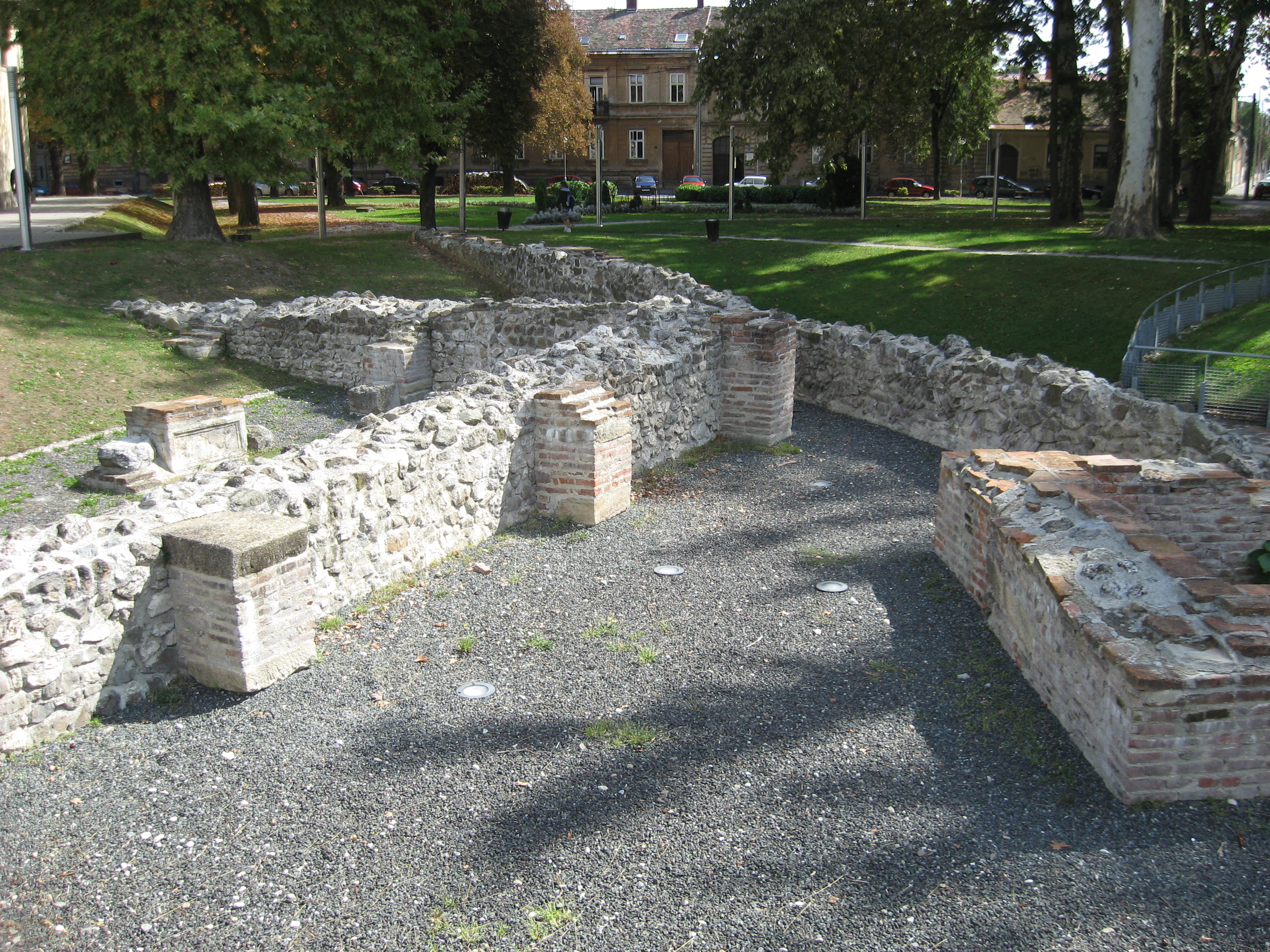
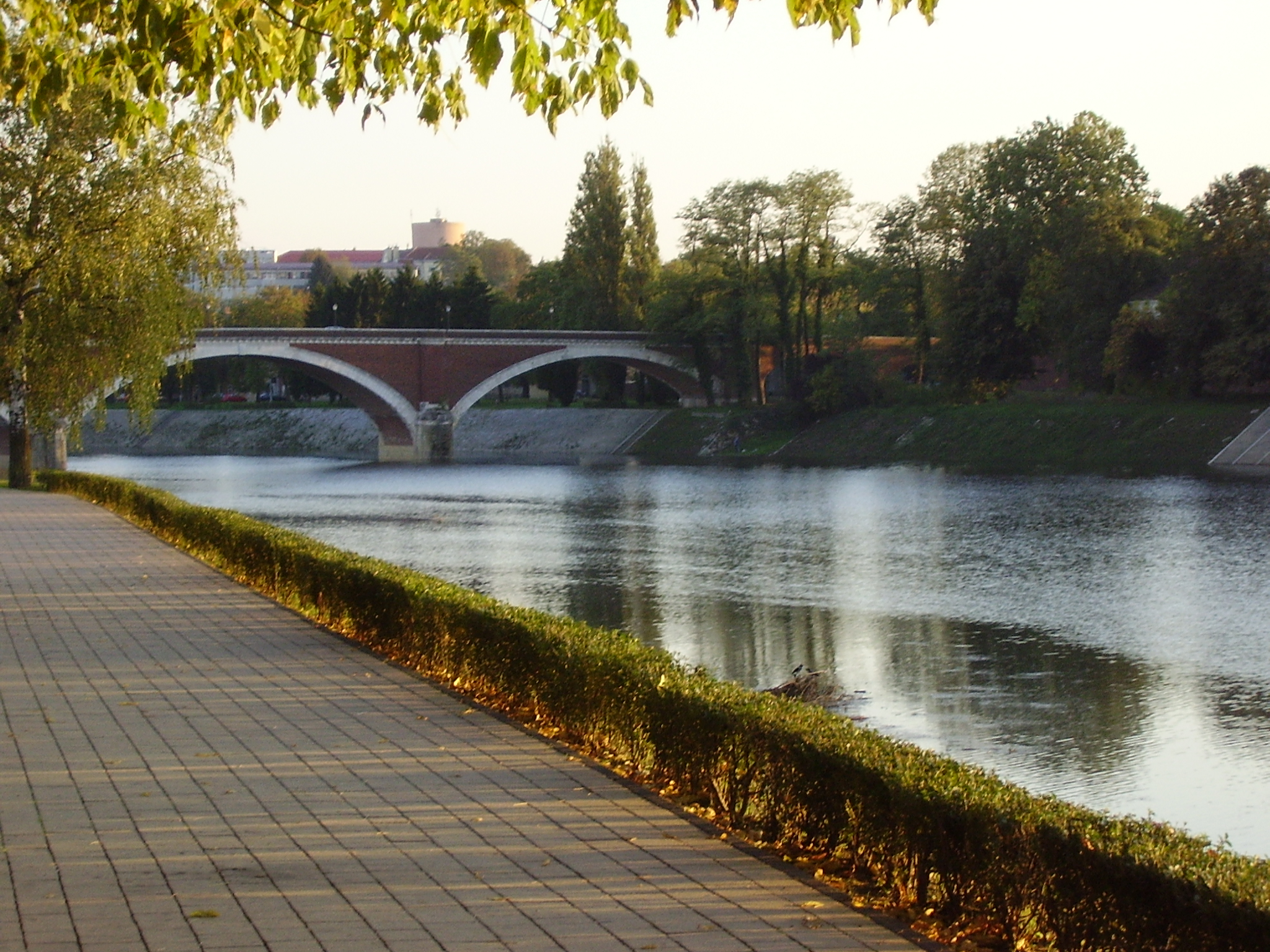
- From top: Veliki Kaptol; Center left: Antun Gustav Matoš monument, Holland Storehouse; Center right: Sisak Fortress, Roman ruins of Siscia; Bottom: Old bridge over the Kupa river

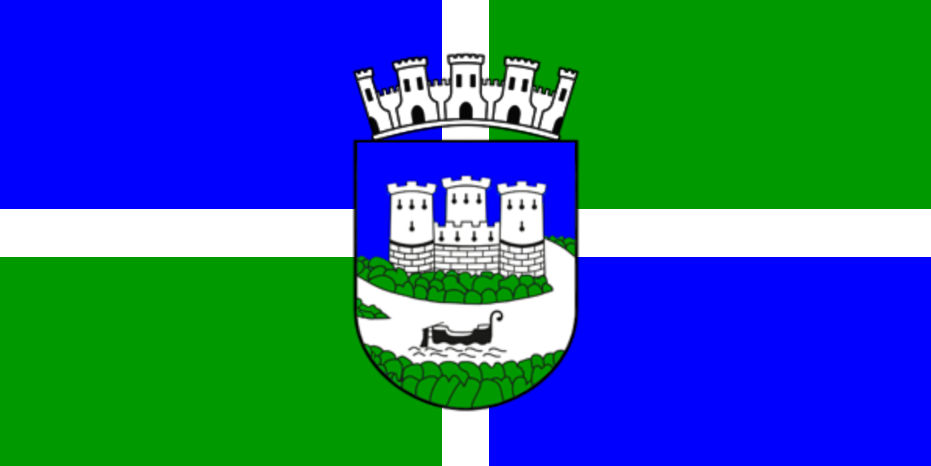
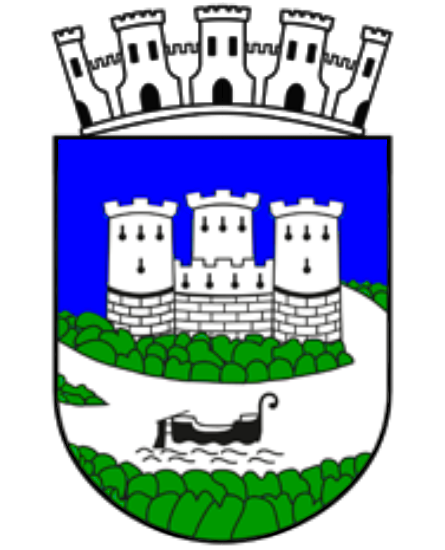
- Flag Seal
- Interactive map of Sisak
- Location of Sisak within Croatia
- Coordinates: 45°29′14″N 16°22′34″E
- Country: Croatia
- Region: Central Croatia (Pokuplje, Posavina)
- County: Sisak-Moslavina County

Government
  - Mayor: Domagoj Orlić (HDZ)
  - City Council: 21 members: • HDZ & partners (13); • SDP & partners (7); • Zoran Sertić (1)

Area
  - City: 421.4 km^{2} (162.7 sq mi)
  - Urban: 32.0 km^{2} (12.4 sq mi)
  - Metro: 989.50 km^{2} (382.05 sq mi)
- Elevation: 98 m (322 ft)

Population (2021)
  - City: 40,121
  - Density: 95.21/km^{2} (246.6/sq mi)
  - Urban: 27,859
  - Urban density: 871/km^{2} (2,250/sq mi)
- Time zone: UTC+1 (CET)
  - Summer (DST): UTC+2 (CEST)
- Postal code: HR-44 000, HR-44 010
- Area code: +385 44
- Vehicle registration: SK
- GDP (nominal): 2019
- Total: €2.169 billion / $2.169 billion
- Per capita: €65,507 / $67,740
- HDI (2019): 0.930 – very high
- Patron saints: Quirinus of Sescia
- Website: sisak.hr

Sisak (pronounced [sǐːsak]; also known by other alternative names) is a city in central Croatia, spanning the confluence of the Kupa, Sava and Odra rivers, 57 km (35 mi) southeast of the Croatian capital Zagreb, and is usually considered to be where the Posavina (Sava basin) begins, with an elevation of 99 m. The city's total population in 2021 was 40,185 of which 27,886 live in the urban settlement (naselje).

Sisak is the administrative centre of the Sisak-Moslavina County, Croatia's biggest river port and a centre of river shipping industry (Dunavski Lloyd). It lies on the D36 state road and the Zagreb-Sisak-Novska railway. Sisak is a regional economic, cultural and historical center. The largest oil refinery in Croatia is located in Sisak.

== Name ==
Prior to belonging to the Roman Empire, which gave it the Latin name Siscia, the region was Celtic and Illyrian and the city there was named Segestica or Segesta. Writers in Ancient Greek referred to the city as Σισκία, Siskía, Σεγέστα, Segésta, and Σεγεστική, Segestikḗ.

In German the town is known as Sissek, in Hungarian as Sziszek [ˈsisɛk], and in Kajkavian and Slovene as Sisek.

== History ==
=== Roman empire ===
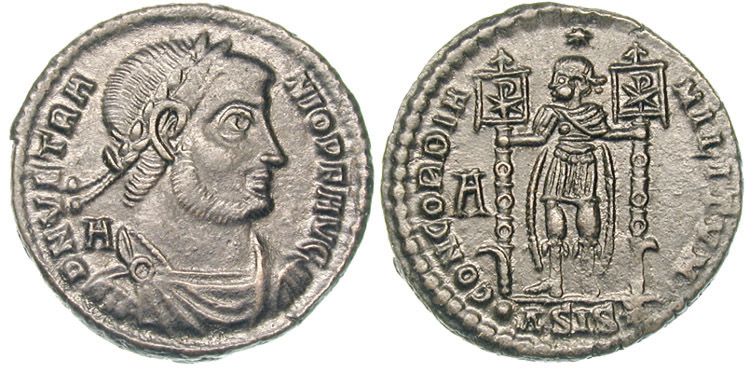
Vetranio coin struck at Siscia mint in 350.

Siscia is described by Roman writers as a great town in the south of Upper Pannonia, on the southern bank of the Savus, on an island formed by that river and two others, the Colapis and Odra, a canal dug by Tiberius completing the island. It was on the great road from Aemona to Sirmium. According to Pliny the name Segestica belonged only to the island, and the town was called Siscia; while Strabo says that Siscia was a fort in the neighbourhood of Segestica; but if this was so, it must be supposed that subsequently the fort and town became united as one place. Siscia was from the first a strongly fortified town; and after its capture by Tiberius, in the reign of Augustus, it became one of the most important places of Pannonia; for being on two navigable rivers, it not only carried on considerable commerce, but became the central point from which Augustus and Tiberius carried on their undertakings against the Pannonians and Illyrians. Tiberius did much to enlarge and embellish the town, which as early as that time seems to have been made a colonia, for Pliny mentions it as such: in the time of Septimius Severus it received fresh colonists, whence in inscriptions it is called Col. Septimia Siscia. The town contained an imperial mint, which produced coins under a series of emperors between 262 and 383 AD.

The Christian martyr Quirinus of Sescia, presumed the first bishop of the Diocese of Sescia, was tortured and nearly killed during Diocletian's persecution of Christians. Legend has it that they tied him to a millstone and threw him into a river, but he freed himself from the weight, escaped and continued to preach his faith. Today he is the patron saint of Sisak. When Diocletian split Pannonia into four provinces, Siscia became the capital of Pannonia Savia, the southwestern one, for which Siscia contained the treasury; at the same time it was the station of the small fleet kept on the Savus. Siscia maintained its importance until Sirmium began to rise, for in proportion as Sirmium rose, Siscia sank and declined.

=== Middle Ages ===
Braslav of Lower Pannonia reigned from Sisak until he was killed in the Hungarian invasion ca. 898. According to Historia Salonitana, Duke Tomislav reclaimed it soon after.

=== Early modern ===
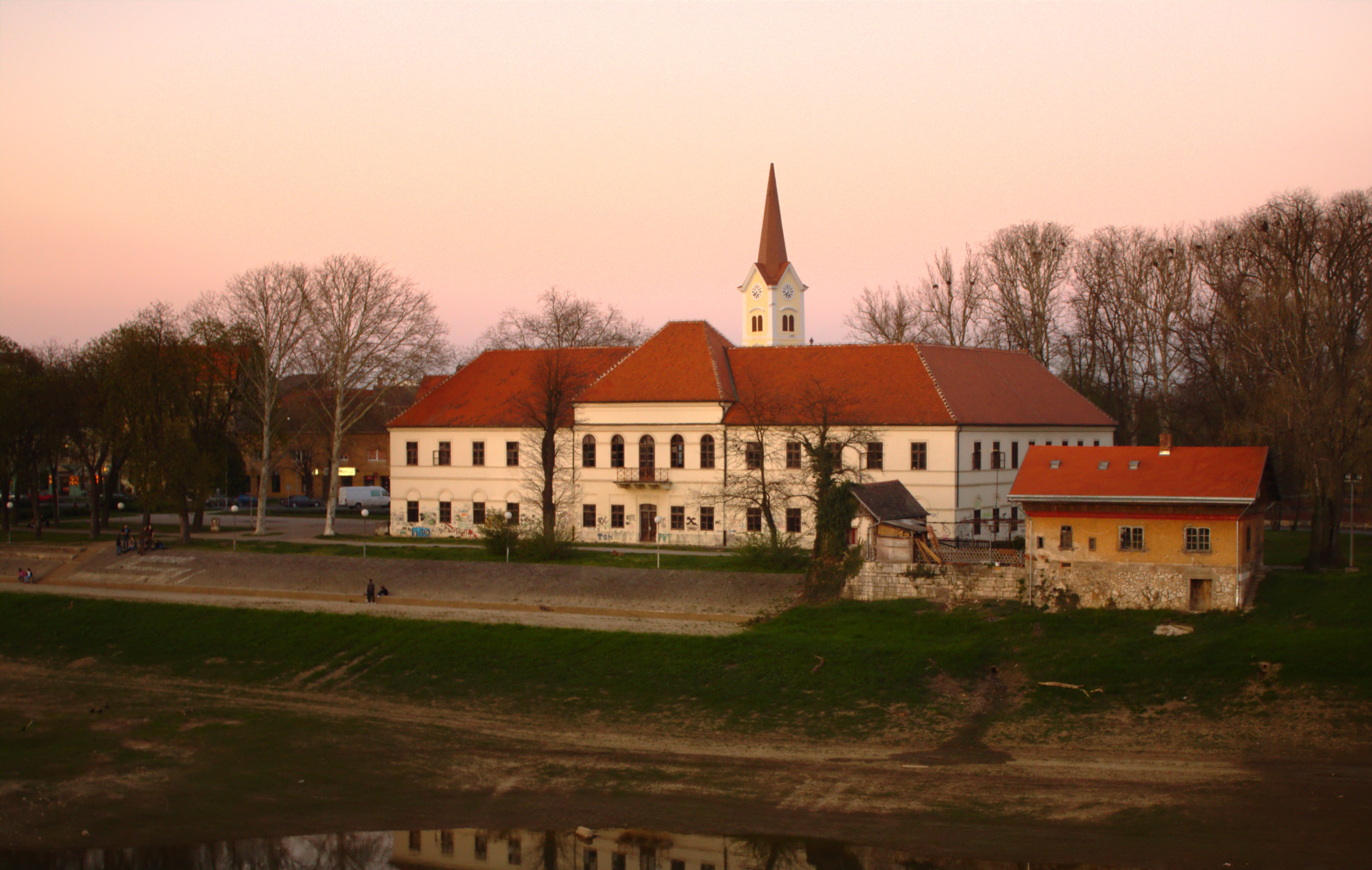
Veliki Kaptol

The 16th-century triangular fortress of the Old Town, well-preserved and turned into the Native Museum, is the main destination of every tourist. The fortress is famous for the victory of the joint forces of Croats, Austrians and Carniolans (Slovenes) over the Ottomans in 1593, known as the Battle of Sisak. It was one of the early significant defeats of the up-to-then invincible Ottoman army on European territory. The Croatian Ban Thomas Erdődy who led the defense in this battle became famous throughout Europe. However this victory didn't prevent Sisak from Ottoman conquest on 24 August 1593. During their brief rule, it was called Siska. Its fortress was manned, a sanjak beg was appointed and a mosque was built in the fortress. On 11 August 1594, Ottoman forces fled and set the fortress on fire after a powerful Habsburg-Croat army approached.

The Baroque palace of Mali Kaptol, the classicist Veliki Kaptol, the brick Stari most ("Old Bridge") over the Kupa, and the ethnological park are the most frequently visited landmarks.

=== Habsburg Monarchy ===
Until the late 19th century Sisak was divided by the Kupa. On the left bank lay Civil or Old Sisak (Croatian: Civilni or Stari Sisak; German: Civil- or Alt-Sisek; cf. Civil Croatia) which belonged to the Zagreb County of the Kingdom of Croatia. On the right bank lay Military or New Sisak (Vojni or Novi Sisak; Militär- or Neu-Sisek), which formed part of the Banaler Grenzland of the Croatian Military Frontier.

After the administrative reorganisation of the late 19th century which followed the Austro-Hungarian compromise, the establishment of the Kingdom of Croatia-Slavonia and the dissolution of the Military Frontier, the now-united Sisak was a district capital within the reconstituted Zagreb County.

=== Modern history ===
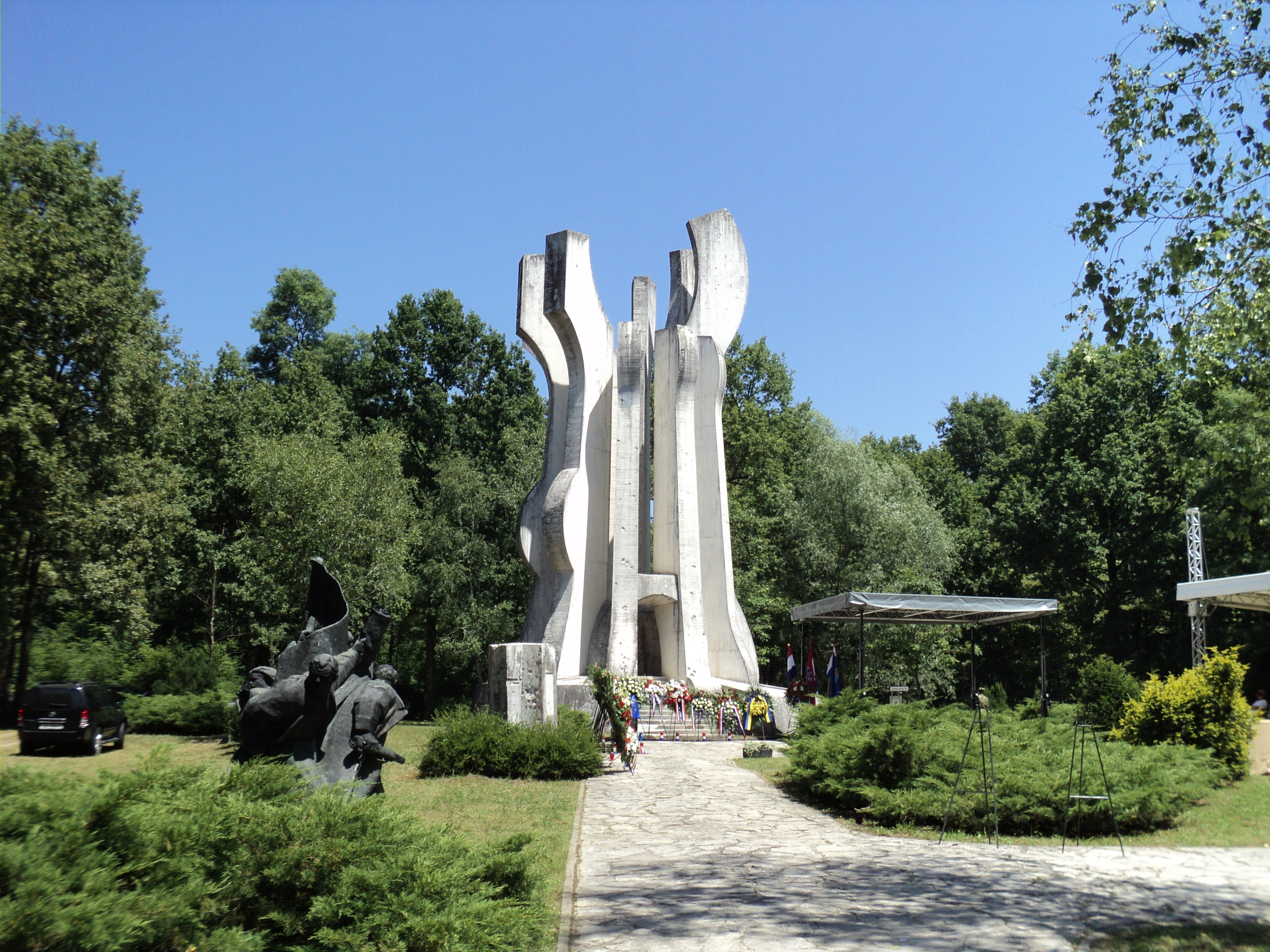
Monument to the 1st Sisak Partisan Detachment

From 1929 to 1939, Sisak was part of the Sava Banovina, and from 1939 to 1941, of the Banovina of Croatia within the Kingdom of Yugoslavia. During World War II, the Sisak children's concentration camp was set up by the Croatian Axis Ustaše government for Serbian, Jewish and Romani children. It is estimated that 1,160–1,600 children lost their lives at the camp.

On 22 June 1941, the day Germany invaded the Soviet Union, the Sisak People's Liberation Partisan Detachment, also known as the 1st Sisak Partisan Detachment, was formed by the outlawed Croatian Communist Party in the Brezovica Forest, near Sisak. It was the first Partisan armed anti-fascist resistance unit formed in occupied Yugoslavia following the invasion of Yugoslavia by the Axis powers in April 1941. It had 79 members, mainly Croats with the exception of one notable Serb woman, Nada Dimić, and was commanded by a Croat, Vladimir Janjić-Capo. The Vjesnik newspaper reported that on 4 May 1945, while retreating from the city, the Ustaše killed between 350 and 400 people from Sisak and the surrounding villages, mostly Croats. Sociologist Jovan Byford states that a more realistic total number of victims would be 150 dead, citing the public prosecutor of the banovina, Branko Drzega.

With the outbreak of the Croatian War of Independence in 1991, Sisak remained in Government hands while the territory to the south was controlled by rebelling Serbs. During the war, the Serb forces often shelled the city, causing dozens of civilian casualties and extensive damage to the city's industry. According to Amnesty International, Serb civilians in Sisak and surrounding areas were subjected to abductions, killings, assault and threats with at least 33 killed between 1991 and 1992, while local human rights activists in Croatia claim that over 100 Serb residents of the Sisak region were killed during the entirety of the war. The frontline dramatically moved eastwards as a result of Operation Storm (1995), effectively ending the war.

Sisak suffered much damage during the 2020 Petrinja earthquake. The town, located roughly 20 km (12 mi) northeast of the epicenter, reported damage to the hospital as well as city hall and various churches. Most of the damage was inflicted on old buildings in the center of the town. However, early figures estimate that 700 to 1,000 homes were damaged in Sisak and nearby villages.

== Population ==
In the 2011 census, of the total population of 47,768 there were 40,590 Croats (84.97%), 3,071 Serbs (6.43%), 1,646 Bosniaks (3.45%), 648 Romani (1.36%), 179 Albanians (0.37%), 29 Montenegrins (0.06%), and the rest were other ethnicities.

In the 2011 census, the population by religion was 37,319 Roman Catholics (78.13%; since 2009 again served by their own Diocese of Sisak), 3,279 Orthodox Christians (6.86%), 2,442 Muslims (5.11%) and others.

City of Sisak: Population trends 1857–2021
v

population	15738	18669	20433	22829	24277	26014	26234	28799	28893	34776	43382	55095	59812	61413	52236	47768	40121
	1857	1869	1880	1890	1900	1910	1921	1931	1948	1953	1961	1971	1981	1991	2001	2011	2021

Sources: Croatian Bureau of Statistics publications

== Municipal makeup ==
The city's administrative area is composed of the following settlements:

- Blinjski Kut, population 278
- Budaševo, population 1,660
- Bukovsko, population 89
- Crnac, population 553
- Čigoč, population 97
- Donje Komarevo, population 322
- Gornje Komarevo, population 508
- Greda, population 861
- Gušće, population 387
- Hrastelnica, population 898
- Jazvenik, population 142
- Klobučak, population 68
- Kratečko, population 200
- Letovanci, population 52
- Lonja, population 111
- Lukavec Posavski, population 127
- Madžari, population 235
- Mužilovčica, population 74
- Novo Pračno, population 444
- Novo Selo, population 624
- Novo Selo Palanječko, population 517
- Odra Sisačka, population 814
- Palanjek, population 318
- Prelošćica, population 528
- Sela, population 969
- Sisak, population 33,049
- Stara Drenčina, population 223
- Staro Pračno, population 896
- Staro Selo, population 110
- Stupno, population 480
- Suvoj, population 42
- Topolovac, population 894
- Veliko Svinjičko, population 271
- Vurot, population 102
- Žabno, population 509

== Administrative division ==
The administrative sections of Sisak are the city neighborhoods (gradske četvrti) and local administrative boards (mjesni odbori). The city neighborhoods are:

- Caprag
- Centar
- Galdovo
- Sisak Novi
- Zeleni Brijeg

The local administrative boards are:

- "Braća Bobetko" Crnac
- Blinjski Kut
- Budaševo
- Bukovsko
- Capraške Poljane
- Čigoć
- Greda
- Gušće
- Hrastelnica
- Jazvenik
- Klobučak
- Komarevo
- Kratečko
- Lukavec Posavski
- Madžari-Letovanci
- Mužilovčica
- Novo Pračno
- Novo Selo
- Novo Selo Palanječko
- Odra
- Palanjek
- Prelošćica
- Sela
- Stara Drenčina
- Staro Pračno
- Staro Selo
- Stupno
- Suvoj-Lonja
- Topolovac
- Veliko Svinjičko
- Vurot
- Žabno

== Politics ==
=== Minority councils and representatives ===
Directly elected minority councils and representatives are tasked with consulting tasks for the local or regional authorities in which they are advocating for minority rights and interests, integration into public life and participation in the management of local affairs. In the most recent election to the Sisak ethnic minority council, the local Bosniak, Roma, and Serb minorities each fulfilled the legal requirements to elect a total of 15 deputies to the minority council of the City of Sisak; while the local Albanian minority elected a representative.

== Miscellaneous ==
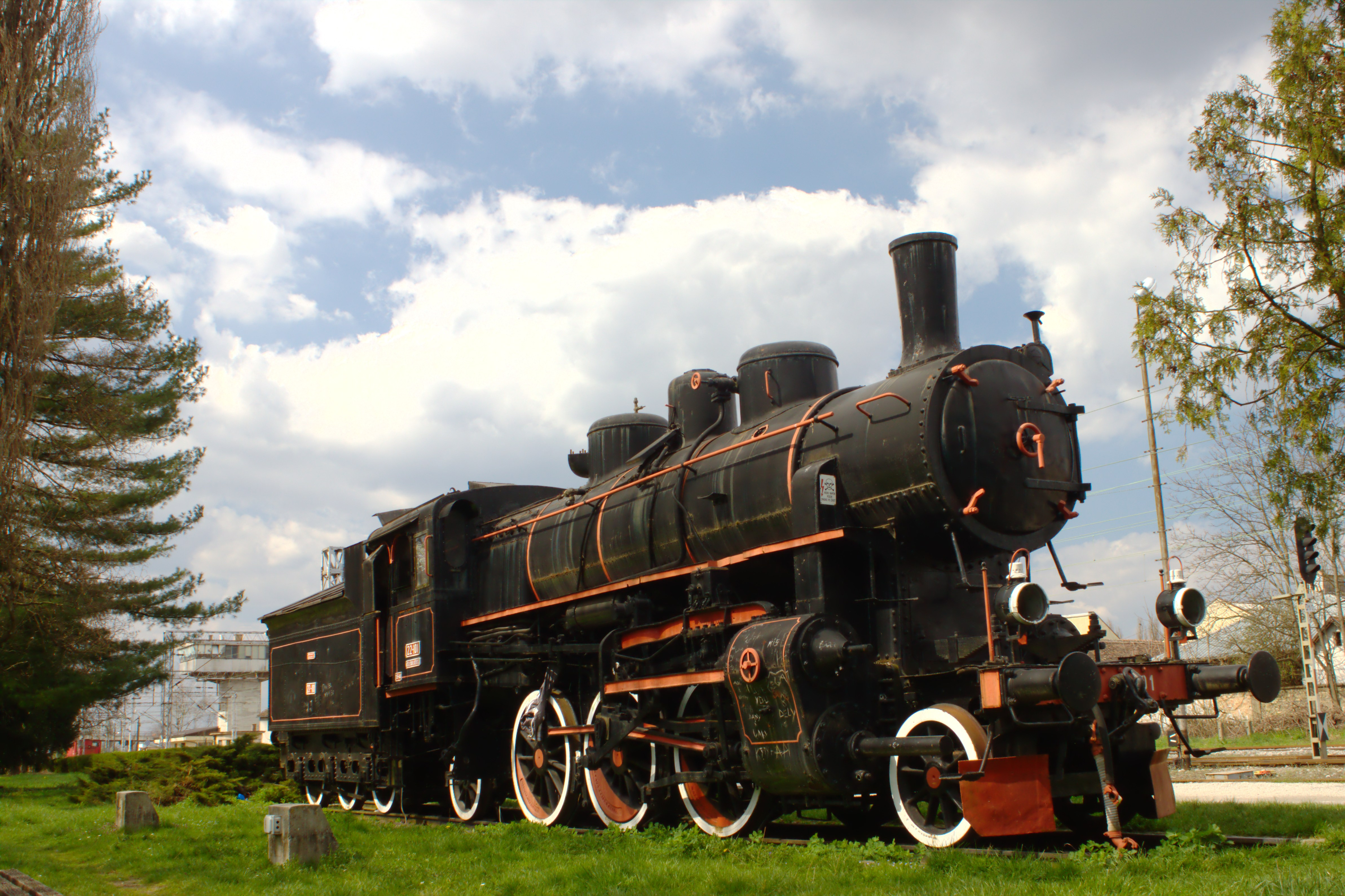
Steam locomotive in front of the Sisak railway station

Chief occupations are farming, ferrous metallurgy (iron works), chemicals, leather (footwear), textiles and food processing plants (dairy products, alcoholic beverages), building material, crude oil refinery and thermal power.

Sisak features the largest metallurgic factory and the largest oil refinery in Croatia. Sisak has many rich mineral springs (spas) with healing properties in the temperature range from 42 to 54 °C (108 to 129 °F).

The city hosts University of Zagreb's Faculty of Metallurgy.

== Sports ==
Sports and recreation areas in the town and its surroundings are mainly rivers and alluvial plains. The Kupa, Odra, and Sava rivers, with their headwaters, offer fishing opportunities; there is a public beach on the Kupa. There are hunting grounds in the regions of Turopolje and Posavina. Sisak is the starting point for sightseeing tours into Lonjsko Polje (The Field of the Lonja River) nature park. The local football club is HNK Segesta. Sisak features the oldest ice hockey club in Croatia, KHL Sisak, established in 1934.

The local chapter of the Croatian Mountaineering Society (HPS) is HPD "Gvozd", which had 61 members in 1936 under the Viktor Borovečki presidency. At the time, it had a ski section. Membership fell to 43 in 1937. Membership fell to 41 in 1938.

== Geography ==
=== Climate ===
Since records began in 1949, the highest temperature recorded at the local weather station at an elevation of 98 metres (322 ft) was 40.0 °C (104.0 °F), on 24 August 2012. The coldest temperature was −25.2 °C (−13.4 °F), on 12 January 1985.

Climate data for Sisak (1971–2000, extremes 1949–2020)
Month	Jan	Feb	Mar	Apr	May	Jun	Jul	Aug	Sep	Oct	Nov	Dec	Year
Record high °C (°F)	21.4 (70.5)	23.4 (74.1)	27.4 (81.3)	32.1 (89.8)	38.3 (100.9)	40.1 (104.2)	41.8 (107.2)	47.8 (118.0)	42.9 (109.2)	38.6 (101.5)	30.0 (86.0)	23.7 (74.7)	47.8 (118.0)
Mean daily maximum °C (°F)	3.7 (38.7)	6.8 (44.2)	12.2 (54.0)	16.7 (62.1)	21.9 (71.4)	24.8 (76.6)	27.0 (80.6)	26.6 (79.9)	22.4 (72.3)	16.2 (61.2)	9.1 (48.4)	4.7 (40.5)	16.0 (60.8)
Daily mean °C (°F)	0.5 (32.9)	2.4 (36.3)	6.8 (44.2)	11.2 (52.2)	16.2 (61.2)	19.4 (66.9)	21.2 (70.2)	20.4 (68.7)	16.1 (61.0)	10.8 (51.4)	5.3 (41.5)	1.5 (34.7)	11.0 (51.8)
Mean daily minimum °C (°F)	−3.1 (26.4)	−2.0 (28.4)	1.5 (34.7)	5.4 (41.7)	9.9 (49.8)	13.1 (55.6)	14.7 (58.5)	14.3 (57.7)	10.5 (50.9)	6.1 (43.0)	1.6 (34.9)	−1.7 (28.9)	5.9 (42.6)
Record low °C (°F)	−41.2 (−42.2)	−29 (−20)	−18.4 (−1.1)	−5 (23)	−2.3 (27.9)	1.9 (35.4)	5.4 (41.7)	3.9 (39.0)	−1.8 (28.8)	−7.2 (19.0)	−15.6 (3.9)	−19.2 (−2.6)	−41.2 (−42.2)
Average precipitation mm (inches)	49.0 (1.93)	48.2 (1.90)	55.0 (2.17)	69.4 (2.73)	79.4 (3.13)	94.7 (3.73)	80.2 (3.16)	77.8 (3.06)	84.5 (3.33)	78.7 (3.10)	91.1 (3.59)	68.3 (2.69)	876.1 (34.49)
Average precipitation days (≥ 0.1 mm)	11.7	10.9	11.6	13.8	13.0	13.8	10.9	10.1	11.5	12.3	12.0	12.4	143.9
Average snowy days (≥ 1.0 cm)	11.8	8.4	2.5	0.4	0.0	0.0	0.0	0.0	0.0	0.0	3.5	8.3	34.8
Average relative humidity (%)	85.0	78.7	71.3	68.5	69.8	71.1	71.1	74.9	79.9	82.8	85.8	87.3	77.2
Mean monthly sunshine hours	52.7	93.2	142.6	174.0	235.6	246.0	285.2	257.3	186.0	114.7	54.0	43.4	1,884.7
Source: Croatian Meteorological and Hydrological Service

== International relations ==
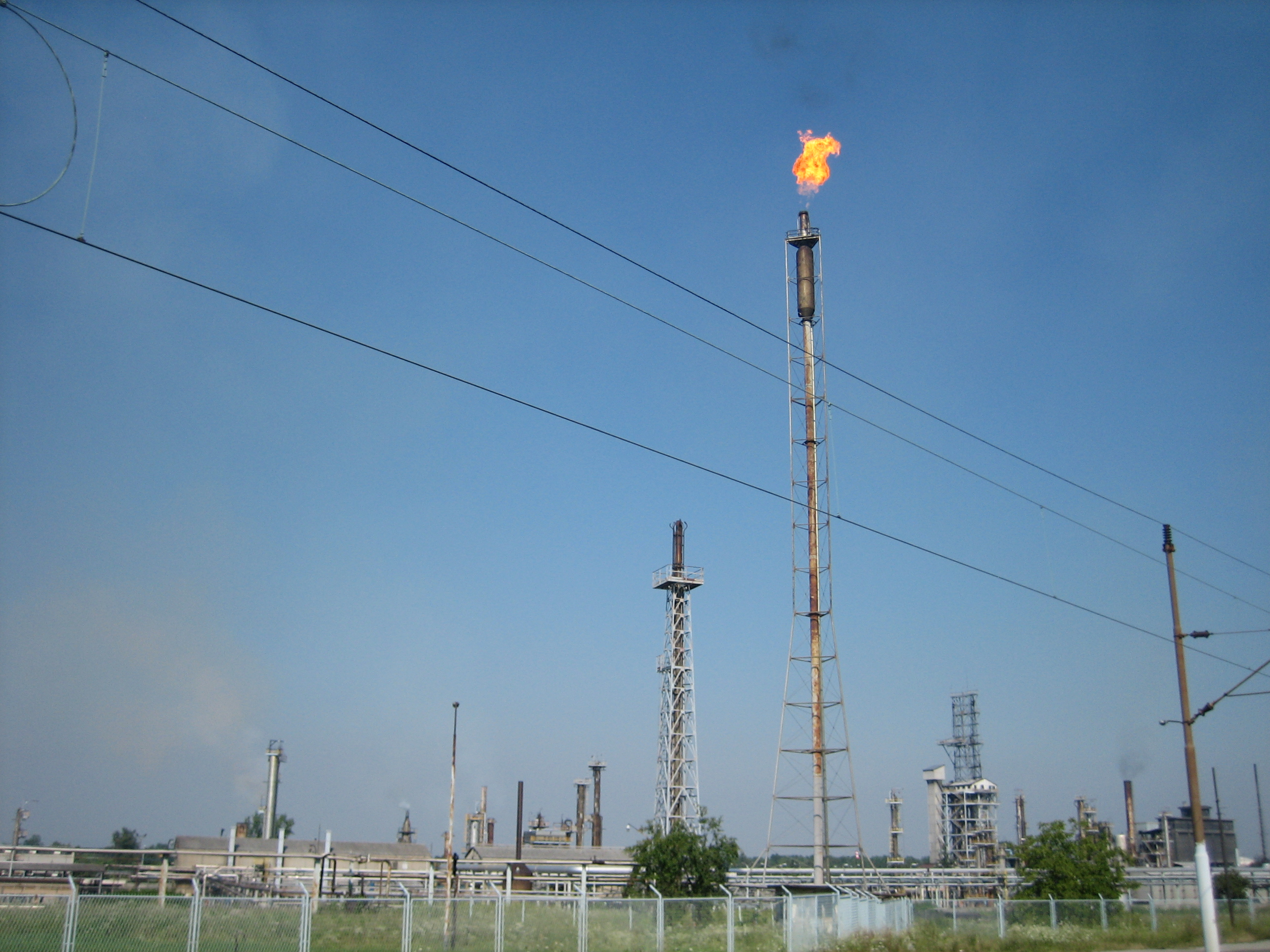
Sisak oil refinery

=== Twin towns – Sister cities ===
Sisak is twinned with:

Gabrovo, Bulgaria (since 2004); Heidenheim, Germany (since 1988); Remchingen, Germany (since 1993)	Szombathely, Hungary (since 2003); Leszno, Poland (since 2003); Jihlava, Czech Republic (since 2004)

== See also ==
- Sisak (eponym)
- Roman Catholic Diocese of Sisak
