= D36 road (Croatia) =

Road in Croatia

D36 state road

Route information
- Length: 107.8 km (67.0 mi)

Major junctions
- From: D1 in Karlovac
- D31 near Pokupsko; D30 in Žažina; D37 in Sisak
- To: A3 Popovača interchange

Location
- Country: Croatia
- Counties: Karlovac, Zagreb County, Sisak-Moslavina
- Major cities: Karlovac, Sisak

Highway system
- Highways in Croatia

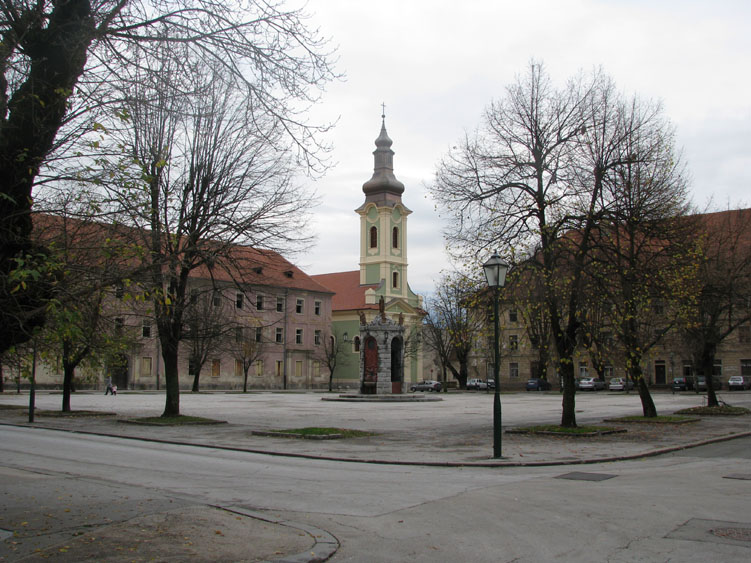
Karlovac, at the western terminus of the D36 road

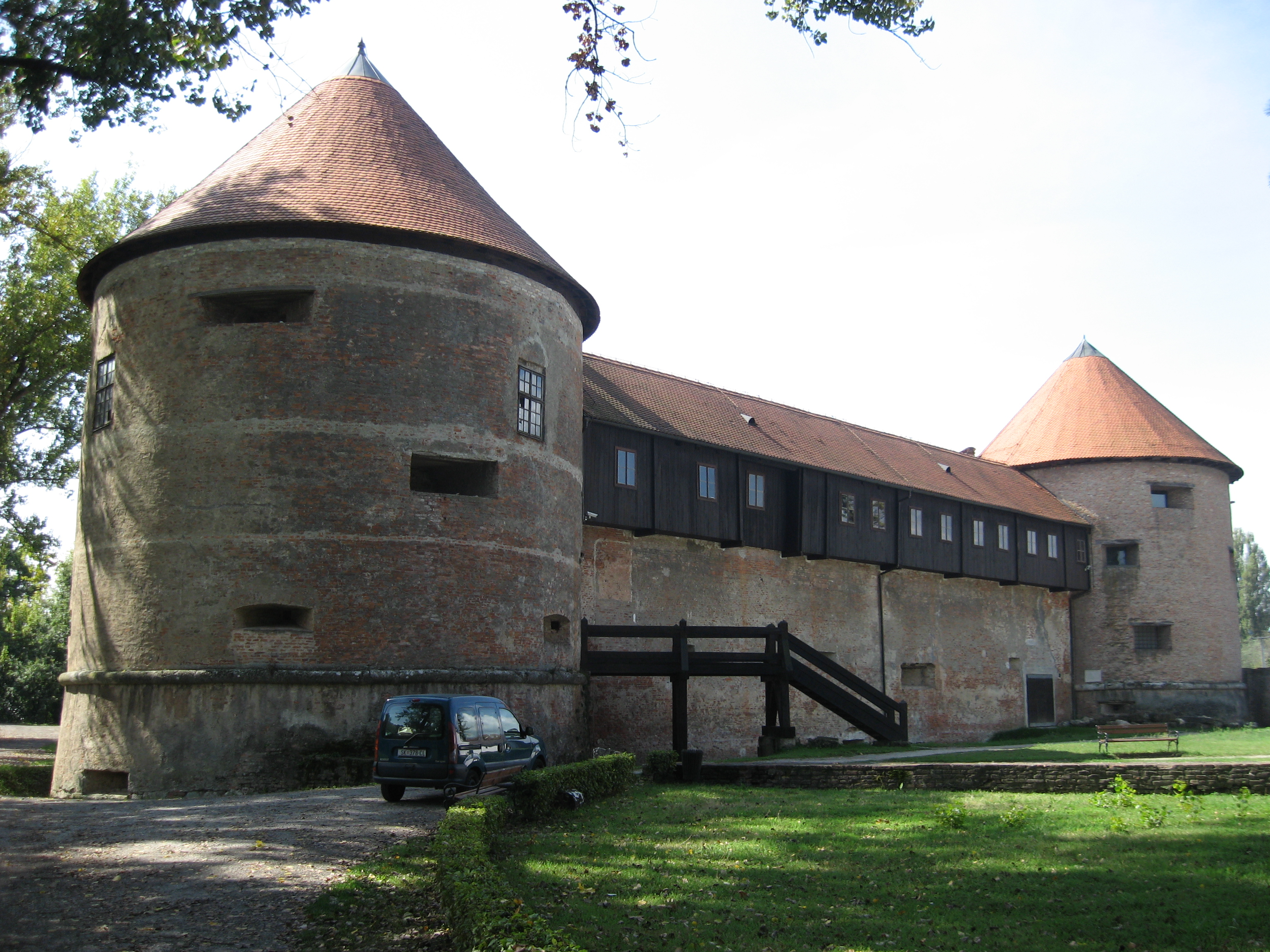
Sisak, on the D36 road route

D36 is a state road in central Croatia connecting Kupa River area and the city of Sisak to Croatian motorway network at the A3 motorway Popovača interchange and to the D1 state road in Karlovac in immediate vicinity of the A1 motorway Karlovac interchange. The road is 107.8 km (67.0 mi) long.

Like all state roads in Croatia, the D36 is managed and maintained by Hrvatske ceste, state owned company.

== Relocation of the route ==
The D36 state road is planned to be rerouted so that it would connect Donja Zenčina interchange on the A1 motorway and the existing route serviced by the D36. The existing road is planned to be diverted between Gradec Pokupski and Lijevo Sredičko to the west, while the road to the east from that section would remain unchanged. This is a project of the Zagreb County and it is predicated on a predicted two-fold increase of traffic on Ž3106 after the construction of the Donja Zdenčina interchange, to between 3,000 and 7,000 vehicles per day.

== Traffic volume ==
Traffic is regularly counted and reported by Hrvatske ceste, operator of the road. Section of the road running through Sisak is not covered by the traffic counting sites, but the section is assumed to carry a substantial volume of urban traffic in addition to the regular D36 traffic.

D36 traffic volume
Road	Counting site	AADT	ASDT	Notes
D36	1921 Orlovac	1,570	1,836	Adjacent to the L34043 junction.
D36	1923 Pisarovina south	1,654	1,942	Adjacent to the Ž3106 junction.
D36	2022 Letovanić	1,212	1,557	Adjacent to the D30 junction.
D36	2021 Stupno	5,850	6,020	Adjacent to the Ž3203 junction.
D36	3201 Novo Selo Palanječko	2,799	2,967	Adjacent to the Ž3206 junction.
D36	2117 Stružec	3,717	4,008	Adjacent to the Ž3161 junction.

== Road junctions and populated areas ==
D36 junctions/populated areas
Type	Slip roads/Notes
	Karlovac; D1 to the A1 motorway Karlovac interchange and Jastrebarsko (to the north) and to Karlovac city centre, Slunj and Knin (to the south). D3 to the A1 motorway Karlovac interchange and Jastrebarsko (to the north) and to Karlovac city centre, Duga Resa and Delnice (to the south). The D1 and the D3 roads are concurrent at location of the D36 junction. The western terminus of the road.
	Rečica
	Luka Pokupska
	Zamršje
	Blatnica Pokupska
	Šišljavić
	Pisarovina; Ž3106 to A1 motorway Donja Zdenčina interchange, Kupinec and Klinča Sela (D1). Ž3108 to Lučelnica.
	Ž3152 to Lasinja, Bović and Blatuša (D6).
	Gradec Pokupski
	Lijevo Sredičko
	Ž1046 to Lukinić Brdo.
	Ž3154 to Lijevi Štefanki.
	Cerje Pokupsko
	D31 to Kravarsko, Velika Gorica and A3 motorway Kosnica interchange (to the north). The D31 and D36 roads are concurrent to the east of the junction.
	Pokupsko
	D31 to Slatina Pokupska and Glina (to the south). The D31 and D36 roads are concurrent to the west of the junction.
	Stari Farkašić
	Stari Brod
	Letovanić
	D30 to Velika Gorica and A3 motorway Buzin interchange (to the north). The D30 and D36 roads are concurrent for approximately 500 m to the east of the junction.
	Žažina; Ž3156 to Mala Gorica (D30)
	D30 to Petrinja and Hrvatska Kostajnica (to the south). The D30 and D36 roads are concurrent for approximately 500 m to the west of the junction.
	Sela
	Stupno
	Odra Sisačka
	The western terminus of double carriage road.
	Sisak; D37 to Petrinja and Glina (D6). The eastern terminus of double carriage road.
	Novo Selo Palanječko
	Stružec; Ž3161 to Osekovo and Gornja Gračenica.
	Potok
	Popovača interchange A3 to Zagreb (to the north) and to Slavonski Brod (to the east). Ž3159 to Popovača. The eastbound D36 traffic defaults to the Ž3159 road and vice versa. The eastern terminus of the road.
