= D31 road (Croatia) =

Road in Croatia

D31 state road

Route information
- Length: 56.2 km (34.9 mi)

Major junctions
- From: D30 near Velika Gorica
- A11 Velika Gorica jug (south) interchange D36 near Pokupsko
- To: D6 near Glina

Location
- Country: Croatia
- Counties: Zagreb County, Sisak-Moslavina
- Major cities: Velika Gorica, Glina

Highway system
- Highways in Croatia

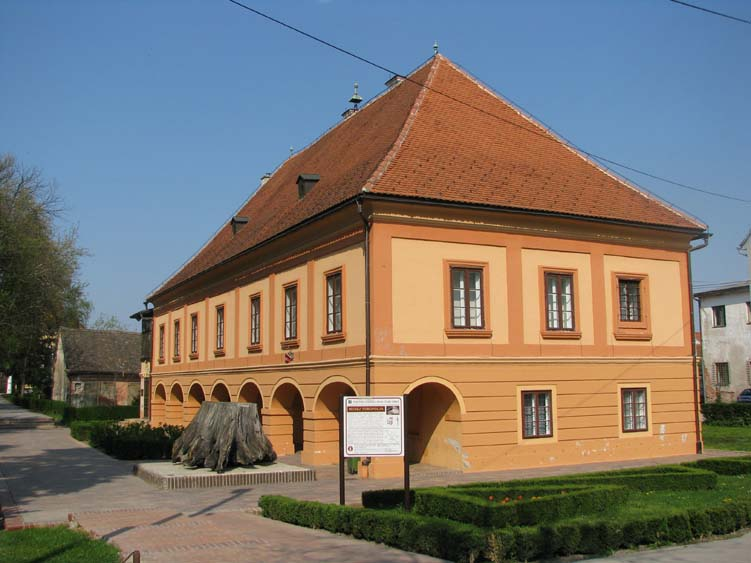
Velika Gorica, next to the D31 road

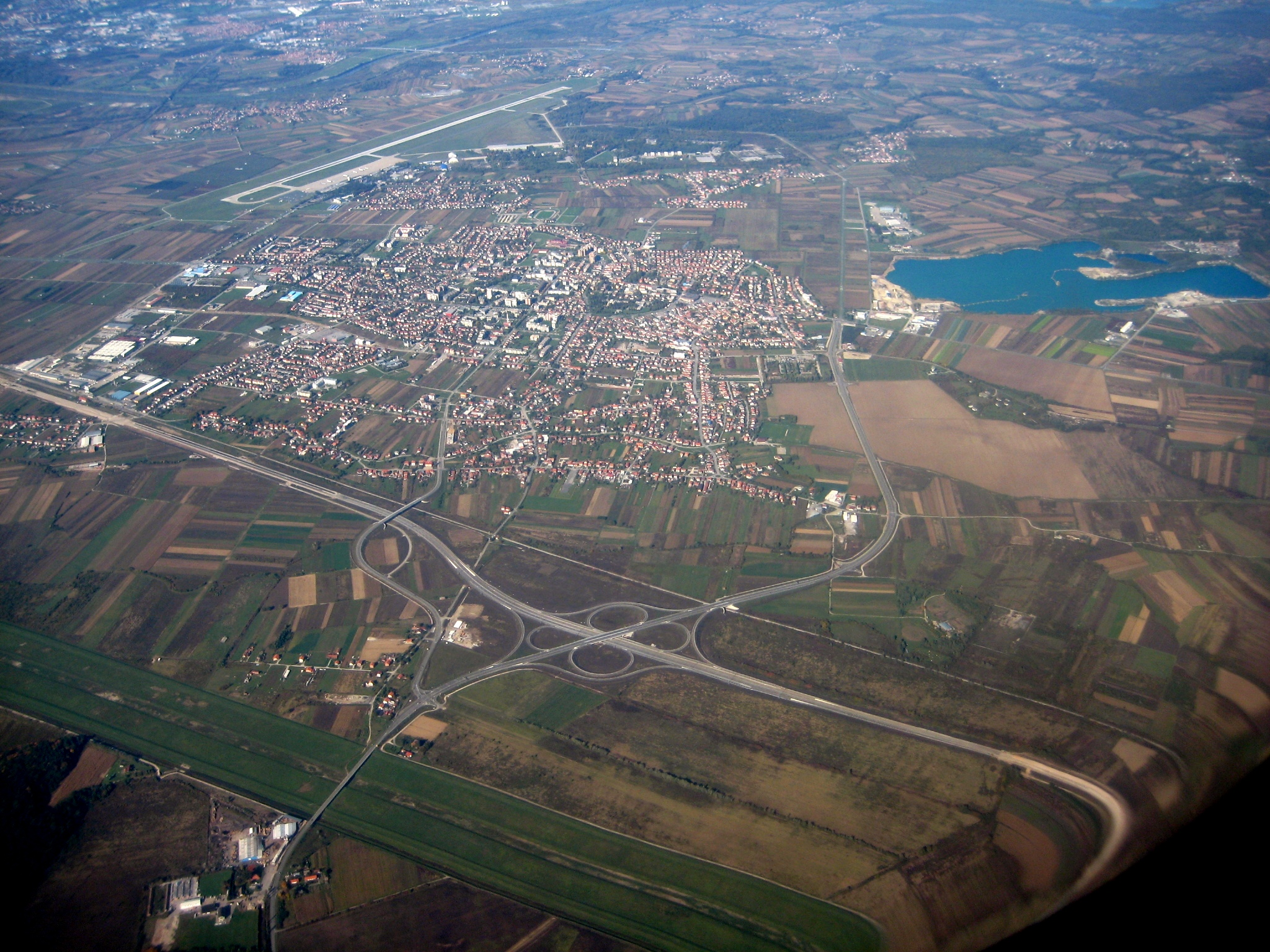
Velika Gorica jug interchange

D31 is a state road in central Croatia connecting Velika Gorica and Glina to Croatian motorway network at the A11 motorway Velika Gorica - jug (south) interchange. The road also serves as a connection to the A3 motorway via D30 state road. The road is 56.2 km (34.9 mi) long. The road, as well as all other state roads in Croatia, is managed and maintained by Hrvatske ceste, state owned company.

== Traffic volume ==
Traffic is regularly counted and reported by Hrvatske ceste, operator of the road.

D31 traffic volume
Road	Counting site	AADT	ASDT	Notes
D31	2016 Kurilovec	4,707	5,045	Adjacent to the Ž3111 junction.
D31	3209 Gornje Taborište	198	229	Adjacent to the Ž3194 junction.

== Road junctions and populated areas ==
D31 junctions/populated areas
Type	Slip roads/Notes
	D30 to A3 motorway Kosnica interchange (to the north) and to Petrinja and Hrvatska Kostajnica (to the west). To Velika Gorica via Sisačka Street. Both the D31 to the south of the interchange and D30 to the north are double carriage roads. The northern terminus of the road.
	To Velika Gorica via Ivana Gorana Kovačića Street.
	To Velika Gorica via Stjepana Fabijančića Jape Street.
	Velika gorica jug (south) interchange A11 to Buševec (to the south). The southern terminus of double carriage road.
	To Velika Gorica via Slavka Kolara Street.
	Mala Buna
	Velika Buna
	Kravarsko
	Ž3155 to Donji Hruševec.
	Gornji Hruševec
	Šestak Brdo
	Cvetić Brdo
	D36 to Pisarovina and Karlovac (to the west). The D31 and D36 roads are concurrent to the south of the junction.
	Pokupsko
	D36 to Sisak and the A3 motorway Popovača interchange (to the east). The D31 and D36 roads are concurrent to the west of the junction.
	Slatina Pokupska; Ž3195 to Zaloj and Prekopa (D37).
	Ž3194 to Gornja Bučica.
	Gornji Viduševac
	D6 to Gvozd, Vojnić and Karlovac (to the west) and to Glina and Dvor (to the east). The southern terminus of the road.
