= Pokupsko =

- Municipality
- Municipality of Pokupsko
- Interactive map of Pokupsko
- Location of Pokupsko in Croatia
- Coordinates: 45°29′13.92″N 15°59′35.88″E
- Country: Croatia
- County: Zagreb County

Area
  - Municipality: 105.9 km^{2} (40.9 sq mi)
  - Urban: 6.5 km^{2} (2.5 sq mi)

Population (2021)
  - Municipality: 1,926
  - Density: 18.19/km^{2} (47.10/sq mi)
  - Urban: 186
  - Urban density: 29/km^{2} (74/sq mi)
- Time zone: UTC+1 (Central European Time)
- Vehicle registration: ZG
- Website: pokupsko.hr

Pokupsko is a village and a municipality in Croatia in the Zagreb County.

In the 2011 census, there were a total of 2,224 inhabitants, in the following settlements:

- Auguštanovec, population 125
- Cerje Pokupsko, population 84
- Cvetnić Brdo, population 37
- Gladovec Pokupski, population 152
- Hotnja, population 236
- Lijevi Degoj, population 69
- Lijevi Štefanki, population 218
- Lukinić Brdo, population 343
- Opatija, population 144
- Pokupsko, population 235
- Roženica, population 305
- Strezojevo, population 154
- Šestak Brdo, population 76
- Zgurić Brdo, population 46

In the same census, an absolute majority were Croats.
