= Bratina (disambiguation) =

Bratina is a village in Croatia.

Bratina may also refer to:

- Bratina (surname)
- Bratina Cup (now Petrov Cup), one of the two Russian trophies awarded to the winner of the play-off of the Major Hockey League (VHL) since the 2010–11 season
- Bratina Island, a small island lying at the north tip of Brown Peninsula in the Ross Ice Shelf, Antarctica
- Bratina Lagoon, a tidal lagoon located on the southwest side of Bratina Island
- Bratina Valley, an upland valley at the east side of Harris Ledge in the Olympus Range, McMurdo Dry Valleys, Antarctica
