= Donja Kupčina =

- Village
- Location within Croatia
- Coordinates: 45°33′04″N 15°48′43″E
- Country: Croatia
- County: Zagreb County
- Municipality: Pisarovina

Area
  - Total: 38.2 km^{2} (14.7 sq mi)

Population (2021)
  - Total: 881
  - Density: 23.1/km^{2} (59.7/sq mi)
- Time zone: UTC+1 (CET)
  - Summer (DST): UTC+2 (CEST)

Donja Kupčina is a village located in the Municipality of Pisarovina, in Zagreb County, Croatia. It is connected by the D36 highway.
