= Stari Brod =

- Village
- Location within Croatia
- Coordinates: 45°29′N 16°10′E
- Country: Croatia

Area
  - Total: 1.9 sq mi (4.8 km^{2})

Population (2021)
  - Total: 159
  - Density: 86/sq mi (33/km^{2})
- Time zone: UTC+1 (CET)
  - Summer (DST): UTC+2 (CEST)

Stari Brod (Serbian: Стари Брод) is a village in Croatia. It is connected by the D36 highway.
