= Cvetnić Brdo =

- Village
- Location within Croatia
- Coordinates: 45°28′48″N 15°58′48″E
- Country: Croatia
- County: Zagreb County
- Municipality: Pokupsko

Area
  - Total: 1.2 km^{2} (0.46 sq mi)

Population (2021)
  - Total: 21
  - Density: 18/km^{2} (45/sq mi)
- Time zone: UTC+1 (CET)
  - Summer (DST): UTC+2 (CEST)

Cvetnić Brdo is a village in Croatia. It is connected by the D31 highway.
