= Lijevo Sredičko =

- Village
- Location within Croatia
- Coordinates: 45°32′N 15°53′E
- Country: Croatia
- County: Zagreb County
- Municipality: Pisarovina

Area
  - Total: 5.3 km^{2} (2.0 sq mi)

Population (2021)
  - Total: 180
  - Density: 34/km^{2} (88/sq mi)
- Time zone: UTC+1 (CET)
  - Summer (DST): UTC+2 (CEST)

Lijevo Sredičko is a village in Croatia. It is connected by the D36 highway.
