= Stara Drenčina =

- Village
- Location within Croatia
- Coordinates: 45°28′26″N 16°19′19″E
- Country: Croatia

Area
  - Total: 11.3 km^{2} (4.4 sq mi)
- Elevation: 98 m (322 ft)

Population (2021)
  - Total: 179
  - Density: 15.8/km^{2} (41.0/sq mi)
- Time zone: UTC+1 (CET)
  - Summer (DST): UTC+2 (CEST)
- Postal code: 44273
- Area code: (+385) 44

Stara Drenčina is a village in Croatia, part of the municipality of Sisak, which itself is a part of Sisak-Moslavina County.

== History ==
The earliest mention of this town was in 1215 under the name "praedium Drencina" In 217 it appeared as "Drenchina"; in 1541 and 1544 as "Drenchyna" and "Inferior Drenchyna" in records. In 1597, its castle was mentioned under the name "Drenczina". The castle was built as part of defense against Ottoman incursion. After the decline of Turkish threat during the second half of the 17th century, the village was settled by a Croatian population. In 1773 it is listed as "Dorf Drenchina" on the Josephinian Land Survey.

In the early years of the 20th century, the declining economic situation forced many of its population to emigrate overseas. In 1918, the town became part of the newly-formed Serbian-Croatian-Slovenian state, which would later form Yugoslavia. During World War II, it was part of the Independent State of Croatia. There was a period of peace following the war, as the Socialist Federal Republic of Yugoslavia reintegrated the area. On June 25, 1991, the village became part of Croatia.

== Population ==
In the 2011 population census, Stara Drenčina had 226 inhabitants. Below is a table of historical population from 1857 to 2011:

	Population according to census							
Year	1857	1869	1880	1890	1900	1910	1921	1931
Population	380	359	347	365	375	361	341	342
Year	1948	1953	1961	1971	1981	1991	2001	2011
Population	323	314	318	263	225	217	195	226

Note: Until 1880, the town was recorded under the name Drenčina

== Landmarks ==
Stara Drenčina has a small wooden chapel dedicated to John the Baptist. It was first mentioned in a record in 1696. The church was completely renovated in 1731, and its tower was built at roughly the same time. The main altar was built in 1740, which was done along with a painting of the interior.

The town also has the remnants of the castle of Drencsina. The castle was built as part of the defense along the Kupa River. As the border with the Ottoman Empire shifted south, its role ceased by the end of the 17th century.
