= Sela, Croatia =

Sela
- Village
- Location within Croatia
- Coordinates: 45°30′N 16°18′E
- Country: Croatia
- County: Sisak-Moslavina County
- Municipality: Sisak

Area
  - Total: 19.8 km^{2} (7.6 sq mi)

Population (2021)
  - Total: 886
  - Density: 44.7/km^{2} (116/sq mi)
- Time zone: UTC+1 (CET)
  - Summer (DST): UTC+2 (CEST)

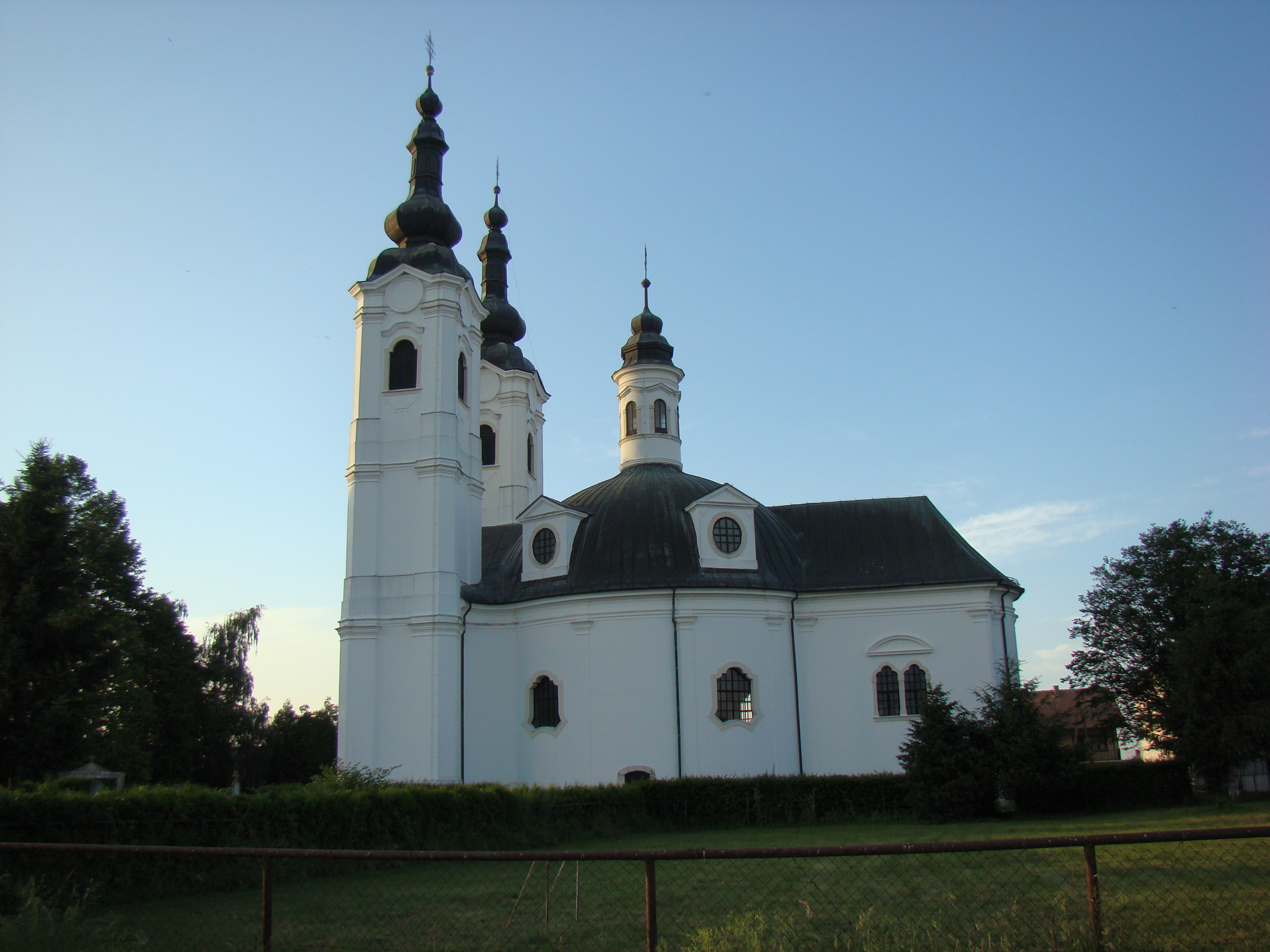
Sela – Church of St. Mary Magdalene

Sela is a village in Croatia. It is connected by the D36 highway.
