= Gladovec Kravarski =

Coordinates: 45°34′N 16°03′E

- Village
- Interactive map of Gladovec Kravarski
- Country: Croatia
- County: Zagreb County
- Municipality: Kravarsko

Area
  - Total: 9.3 km^{2} (3.6 sq mi)

Population (2021)
  - Total: 194
  - Density: 21/km^{2} (54/sq mi)
- Time zone: UTC+1 (CET)
  - Summer (DST): UTC+2 (CEST)

Gladovec Kravarski is a village in Croatia.
