= Stružec =

Coordinates: 45°32′N 16°33′E

- Village
- Interactive map of Stružec
- Country: Croatia
- County: Sisak-Moslavina County

Area
  - Total: 29.9 km^{2} (11.5 sq mi)

Population (2021)
  - Total: 556
  - Density: 18.6/km^{2} (48.2/sq mi)
- Time zone: UTC+1 (CET)
  - Summer (DST): UTC+2 (CEST)

Stružec is a village in Croatia. It is connected by the D36 highway.

== Climate ==
Since records began in 1981, the highest temperature recorded at the local weather station was 39.5 °C (103.1 °F), on 24 August 2012. The coldest temperature was −23.0 °C (−9.4 °F), on 12 January 1985.
