= Stari Farkašić =

Coordinates: 45°29′N 16°09′E

- Village
- Interactive map of Stari Farkašić
- Country: Croatia
- County: Sisak-Moslavina County

Area
  - Total: 18.8 km^{2} (7.3 sq mi)

Population (2021)
  - Total: 73
  - Density: 3.9/km^{2} (10/sq mi)
- Time zone: UTC+1 (CET)
  - Summer (DST): UTC+2 (CEST)

Stari Farkašić is a village in Croatia. It is connected by the D36 highway.
