= Blinjski Kut =

- Village
- Location within Croatia
- Coordinates: 45.410864°N 16.462326°E
- Country: Croatia
- Region: Banovina
- County: Sisak-Moslavina County
- City: Sisak

Area
  - Total: 6.5 km^{2} (2.5 sq mi)
- Elevation: 100 m (330 ft)

Population (2021)
  - Total: 194
  - Density: 30/km^{2} (77/sq mi)
- Time zone: UTC+1 (CET)
  - Summer (DST): UTC+2 (CEST)
- Postal code: 44211
- Area code: 044

Blinjski Kut is a village in the Banovina region of Croatia. The settlement is administered as a part of the City of Sisak and the Sisak-Moslavina County. According to the 2011 census, the village has 277 inhabitants. It is connected by the D224 state road.
