= Gradec Pokupski =

- Village
- Location within Croatia
- Coordinates: 45°37′12″N 15°49′12″E
- Country: Croatia
- County: Zagreb County
- Municipality: Pisarovina

Area
  - Total: 3.7 km^{2} (1.4 sq mi)

Population (2021)
  - Total: 106
  - Density: 29/km^{2} (74/sq mi)
- Time zone: UTC+1 (CET)
  - Summer (DST): UTC+2 (CEST)

Gradec Pokupski is a village in Croatia. It is connected by the D36 highway.
