= Mala Buna =

Coordinates: 45°38′N 16°04′E

- Village
- Interactive map of Mala Buna
- Country: Croatia
- Region: Central Croatia
- County: Zagreb County
- Municipality: Velika Gorica

Area
  - Total: 2.0 km^{2} (0.77 sq mi)

Population (2021)
  - Total: 248
  - Density: 120/km^{2} (320/sq mi)
- Time zone: UTC+1 (CET)
  - Summer (DST): UTC+2 (CEST)

Mala Buna is a village in Croatia. It is connected by the D31 highway.
