= Auguštanovec =

Settlement in Zagreb County, Croatia

- Settlement
- Interactive map of Auguštanovec
- Location within Croatia
- Coordinates: 45°29′13″N 15°59′35″E
- Country: Croatia
- County: Zagreb County
- Municipality: Pokupsko

Area
  - Total: 6.4 km^{2} (2.5 sq mi)

Population (2021)
  - Total: 101
  - Density: 16/km^{2} (41/sq mi)
- Time zone: UTC+1 (CET)
  - Summer (DST): UTC+2 (CEST)
- Postal code: 10414 Pokupsko
- Area code: +385 (0)1

Auguštanovec is a settlement in the Municipality of Pokupsko in Croatia. In 2021, its population was 101.

== Demographics ==
Auguštanovec: Population trends 1857–2021
v

| population | 469 | 521 | 448 | 532 | 527 | 511 | 494 | 545 | 486 | 429 | 348 | 289 | 246 | 193 | 170 | 125 | 101 |
| | 1857 | 1869 | 1880 | 1890 | 1900 | 1910 | 1921 | 1931 | 1948 | 1953 | 1961 | 1971 | 1981 | 1991 | 2001 | 2011 | 2021 |

Sources: Croatian Bureau of Statistics publications
