= Pisarovina =

- Municipality
- Municipality of Pisarovina
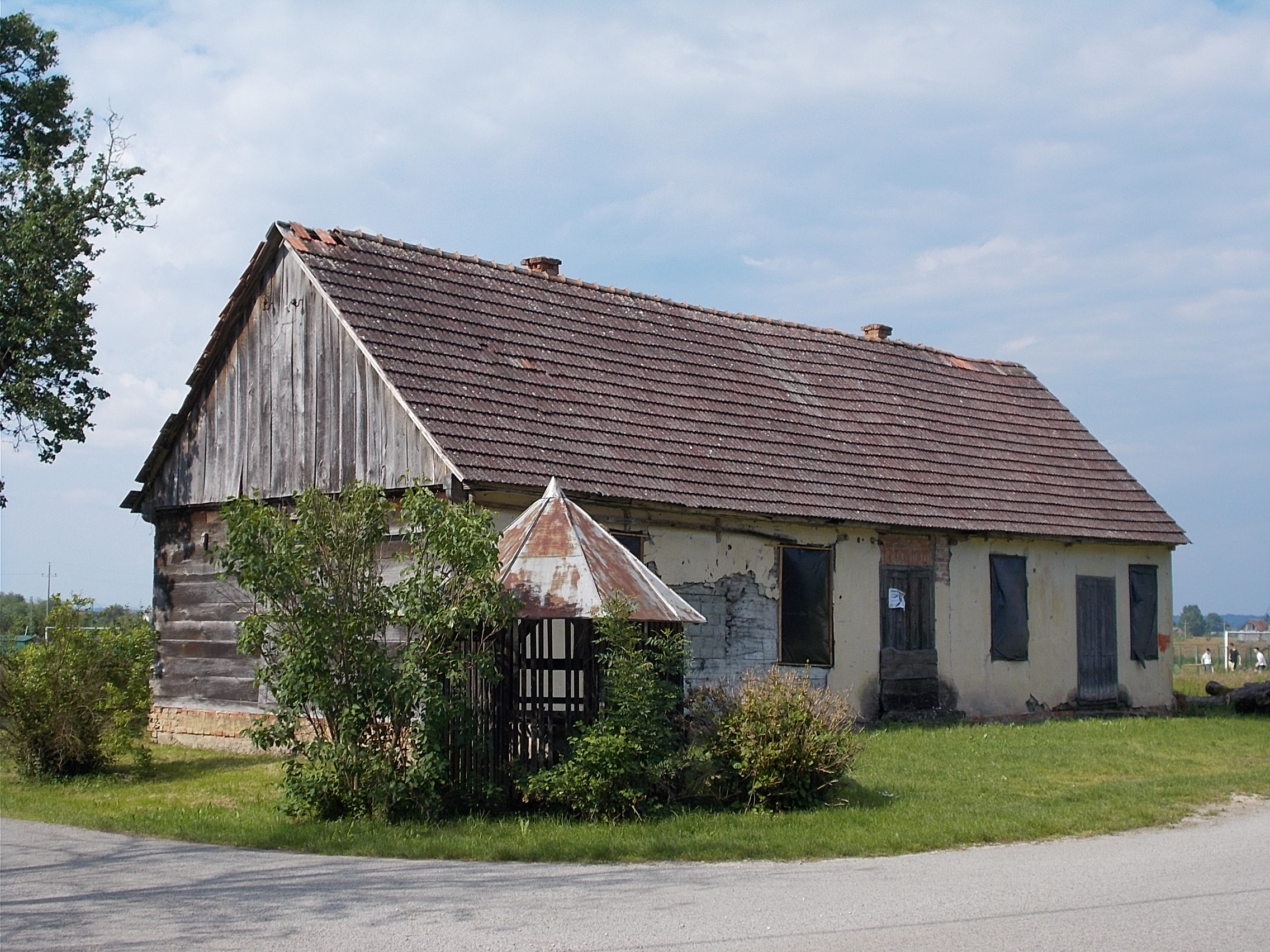
- Interactive map of Pisarovina
- Location of Pisarovina in Croatia
- Coordinates: 45°35′14″N 15°51′30″E
- Country: Croatia
- County: Zagreb County

Area
  - Municipality: 145.4 km^{2} (56.1 sq mi)
  - Urban: 12.1 km^{2} (4.7 sq mi)

Population (2021)
  - Municipality: 3,484
  - Density: 23.96/km^{2} (62.06/sq mi)
  - Urban: 436
  - Urban density: 36.0/km^{2} (93.3/sq mi)
- Time zone: UTC+1 (Central European Time)
- Vehicle registration: ZG
- Website: pisarovina.hr

Pisarovina is a village and a municipality in Croatia in the Zagreb County.

== Population ==
In the 2011 census, there were a total of 3,689 inhabitants, in the following settlements:

- Bratina, population 704
- Bregana Pisarovinska, population 243
- Donja Kupčina, population 974
- Dvoranci, population 178
- Gorica Jamnička, population 116
- Gradec Pokupski, population 111
- Jamnica Pisarovinska, population 54
- Lijevo Sredičko, population 196
- Lučelnica, population 298
- Pisarovina, population 440
- Podgorje Jamničko, population 12
- Selsko Brdo, population 107
- Topolovec Pisarovinski, population 61
- Velika Jamnička, population 195

In the same census, an absolute majority were Croats.

== Climate ==
Since records began in 1981, the highest temperature recorded at the local weather station was 39.5 °C (103.1 °F), on 4 August 2017. The coldest temperature was −23.6 °C (−10.5 °F), on 23 February 1985.

== History ==
In the late 19th and early 20th century, Pisarovina was a district capital in the Zagreb County of the Kingdom of Croatia-Slavonia.

There is a legend about the making of Pisarovina. According to this legend, at the place where Pisarovina is today, there was a count's estate, which is a historical fact. Countess Sara lived there, who was seriously ill. There were numerous vineyards around the Count's estate and Sarah probably really liked to drink wine. At that moment her servants, the contractors, offered her wine, and they told her, "Sarah, drink some wine!" (Pij Saro vina) - That's what the legend of the name Pisarovina says.
