= Cerje Pokupsko =

- Village
- Location within Croatia
- Coordinates: 45.501434°N 15.960363°E
- Country: Croatia
- County: Zagreb County
- Municipality: Pokupsko

Area
  - Total: 6.7 km^{2} (2.6 sq mi)

Population (2021)
  - Total: 68
  - Density: 10/km^{2} (26/sq mi)
- Time zone: UTC+1 (CET)
  - Summer (DST): UTC+2 (CEST)

Cerje Pokupsko is a village in Croatia. It is connected by the D36 highway.
