= Velika Buna =

Coordinates: 45°38′N 16°04′E

- Village
- Interactive map of Velika Buna
- Country: Croatia
- Region: Central Croatia
- County: Zagreb County
- Municipality: Velika Gorica

Area
  - Total: 11.5 km^{2} (4.4 sq mi)

Population (2021)
  - Total: 836
  - Density: 72.7/km^{2} (188/sq mi)
- Time zone: UTC+1 (CET)
  - Summer (DST): UTC+2 (CEST)

Velika Buna is a village in Croatia. It is connected by the D31 highway.
