= Blatnica Pokupska =

Coordinates: 45°30′47″N 15°43′30″E

- Village
- Interactive map of Blatnica Pokupska
- Country: Croatia
- County: Karlovac
- Town: Karlovac

Area
  - Total: 0.7 km^{2} (0.27 sq mi)

Population (2021)
  - Total: 32
  - Density: 46/km^{2} (120/sq mi)
- Time zone: UTC+1 (CET)
  - Summer (DST): UTC+2 (CEST)

Blatnica Pokupska is a village in Croatia. It is connected by the D36 highway. There were 59 inhabitants living there in 2001.
