= Dvoranci =

Coordinates: 45°34′N 15°52′E

- Village
- Interactive map of Dvoranci
- Country: Croatia
- County: Zagreb County

Area
  - Total: 9.3 km^{2} (3.6 sq mi)

Population (2021)
  - Total: 174
  - Density: 19/km^{2} (48/sq mi)
- Time zone: UTC+1 (CET)
  - Summer (DST): UTC+2 (CEST)

Dvoranci is a village in Croatia. In 1991, it had a population of 222.
