= Lučelnica =

- Village
- Location within Croatia
- Coordinates: 45°35′N 15°55′E
- Country: Croatia
- County: Zagreb County
- Municipality: Pisarovina

Area
  - Total: 15.6 km^{2} (6.0 sq mi)

Population (2021)
  - Total: 283
  - Density: 18.1/km^{2} (47.0/sq mi)
- Time zone: UTC+1 (CET)
  - Summer (DST): UTC+2 (CEST)

Lučelnica is a village in Croatia.
