= Novo Pračno =

Coordinates: 45°26′33″N 16°22′16″E

- Village
- Interactive map of Novo Pračno
- Country: Croatia
- County: Sisak-Moslavina County

Area
  - Total: 2.4 km^{2} (0.93 sq mi)

Population (2021)
  - Total: 346
  - Density: 140/km^{2} (370/sq mi)
- Time zone: UTC+1 (CET)
  - Summer (DST): UTC+2 (CEST)

Novo Pračno is a village in Croatia. It is connected by the D224 highway.
