= Slatina Pokupska =

- Village
- Interactive map of Slatina Pokupska
- Country: Croatia
- Region: Continental Croatia (Banovina)
- County: Sisak-Moslavina
- Municipality: Glina

Area
  - Total: 7.5 km^{2} (2.9 sq mi)

Population (2021)
  - Total: 82
  - Density: 11/km^{2} (28/sq mi)
- Time zone: UTC+1 (CET)
  - Summer (DST): UTC+2 (CEST)

Slatina Pokupska is a village in Croatia. It is connected by the D31 highway.
