= Donji Hruševec =

- Village
- Location within Croatia
- Coordinates: 45°32′N 16°04′E
- Country: Croatia
- County: Zagreb County
- Municipality: Kravarsko

Area
  - Total: 13.9 km^{2} (5.4 sq mi)

Population (2021)
  - Total: 271
  - Density: 19.5/km^{2} (50.5/sq mi)
- Time zone: UTC+1 (CET)
  - Summer (DST): UTC+2 (CEST)

Donji Hruševec is a village in Croatia.
