= Hrastelnica =

Coordinates: 45°30′N 16°25′E

- Village
- Interactive map of Hrastelnica
- Country: Croatia
- County: Sisak-Moslavina County

Area
  - Total: 17.3 km^{2} (6.7 sq mi)

Population (2021)
  - Total: 744
  - Density: 43.0/km^{2} (111/sq mi)
- Time zone: UTC+1 (CET)
  - Summer (DST): UTC+2 (CEST)

Hrastelnica is a village in Croatia.
