= Budaševo =

Coordinates: 45°28′N 16°26′E

- Village
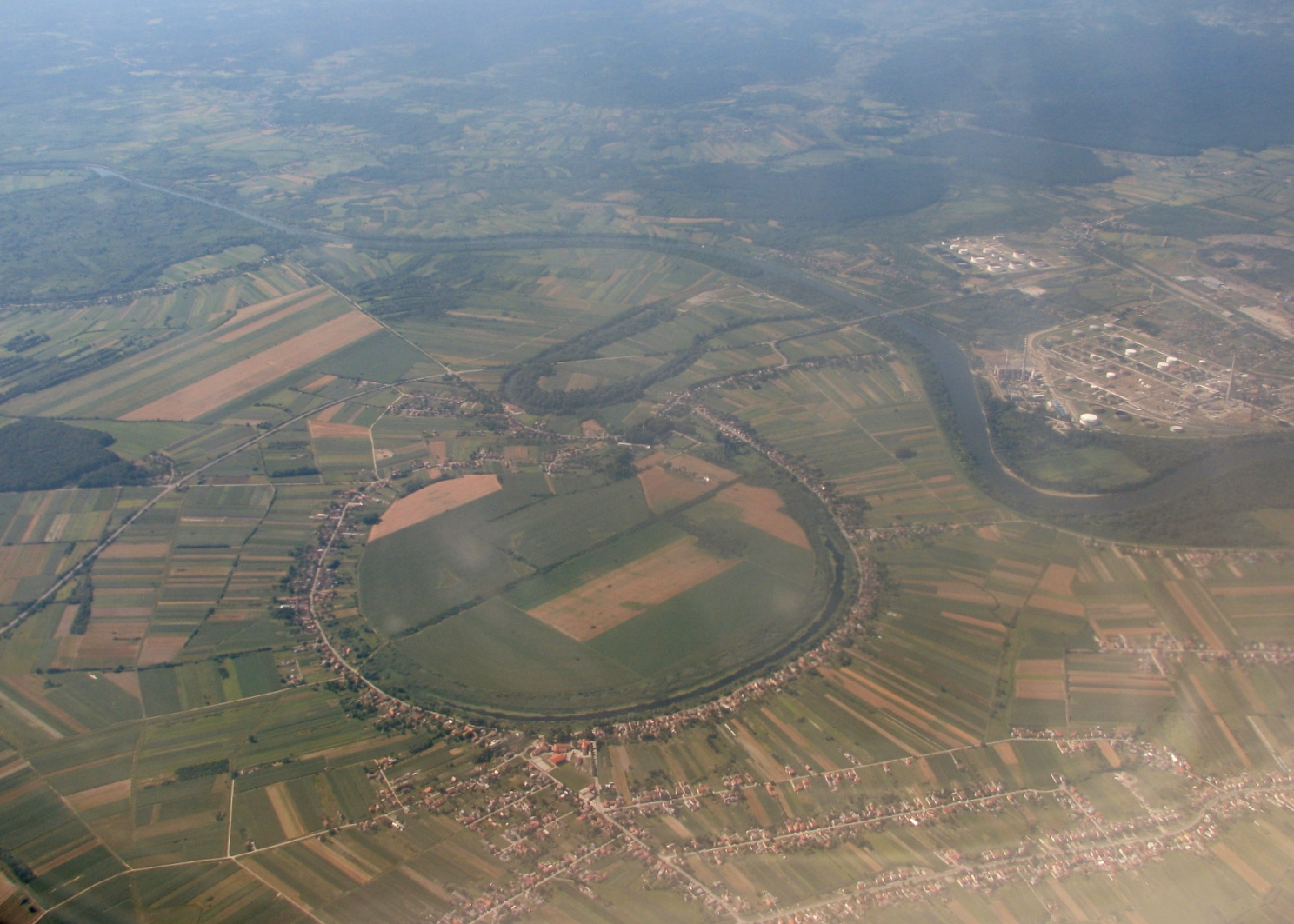
- Aerial view of Budaševo, Sisak-Moslavina County
- Interactive map of Budaševo
- Country: Croatia
- County: Sisak-Moslavina County

Area
  - Total: 5.6 km^{2} (2.2 sq mi)

Population (2021)
  - Total: 1,373
  - Density: 250/km^{2} (640/sq mi)
- Time zone: UTC+1 (CET)
  - Summer (DST): UTC+2 (CEST)

Budaševo is a village in Croatia.
