= Gladovec Pokupski =

Coordinates: 45°30′N 16°00′E

- Village
- Interactive map of Gladovec Pokupski
- Country: Croatia
- County: Zagreb County

Area
  - Total: 10.8 km^{2} (4.2 sq mi)

Population (2021)
  - Total: 161
  - Density: 14.9/km^{2} (38.6/sq mi)
- Time zone: UTC+1 (CET)
  - Summer (DST): UTC+2 (CEST)

Gladovec Pokupski is a village in Croatia.
