= Šestak Brdo =

Coordinates: 45°32′N 15°59′E

- Village
- Interactive map of Šestak Brdo
- Country: Croatia
- County: Zagreb County

Area
  - Total: 2.9 km^{2} (1.1 sq mi)

Population (2021)
  - Total: 66
  - Density: 23/km^{2} (59/sq mi)
- Time zone: UTC+1 (CET)
  - Summer (DST): UTC+2 (CEST)

Šestak Brdo is a village in Croatia. It is connected by the D31 highway.
