= Greda, Sisak-Moslavina County =

Greda
- Village
- Interactive map of Greda
- Coordinates: 45°31′38″N 16°16′30″E
- Country: Croatia
- County: Sisak-Moslavina County

Area
  - Total: 23.5 km^{2} (9.1 sq mi)

Population (2021)
  - Total: 763
  - Density: 32.5/km^{2} (84.1/sq mi)
- Time zone: UTC+1 (CET)
  - Summer (DST): UTC+2 (CEST)

Greda is a village in Croatia.

== Population ==
Village of Greda: Population trends 1857–2021
v

population	777	779	773	853	857	884	885	849	871	1001	1081	1081	1082	1113	1010	858	763
	1857	1869	1880	1890	1900	1910	1921	1931	1948	1953	1961	1971	1981	1991	2001	2011	2021

Sources: Croatian Bureau of Statistics publications
