= Novo Selo Palanječko =

- Village
- Location within Croatia
- Country: Croatia
- County: Sisak-Moslavina County

Area
  - Total: 22.5 km^{2} (8.7 sq mi)

Population (2021)
  - Total: 447
  - Density: 19.9/km^{2} (51.5/sq mi)
- Time zone: UTC+1 (CET)
  - Summer (DST): UTC+2 (CEST)

Novo Selo Palanječko is a village in Croatia. It is connected by the D36 highway. The etymology of the village comes from Slavic languages meaning new village, Novo Selo.
