= Stupno =

Coordinates: 45°31′N 16°19′E

- Village
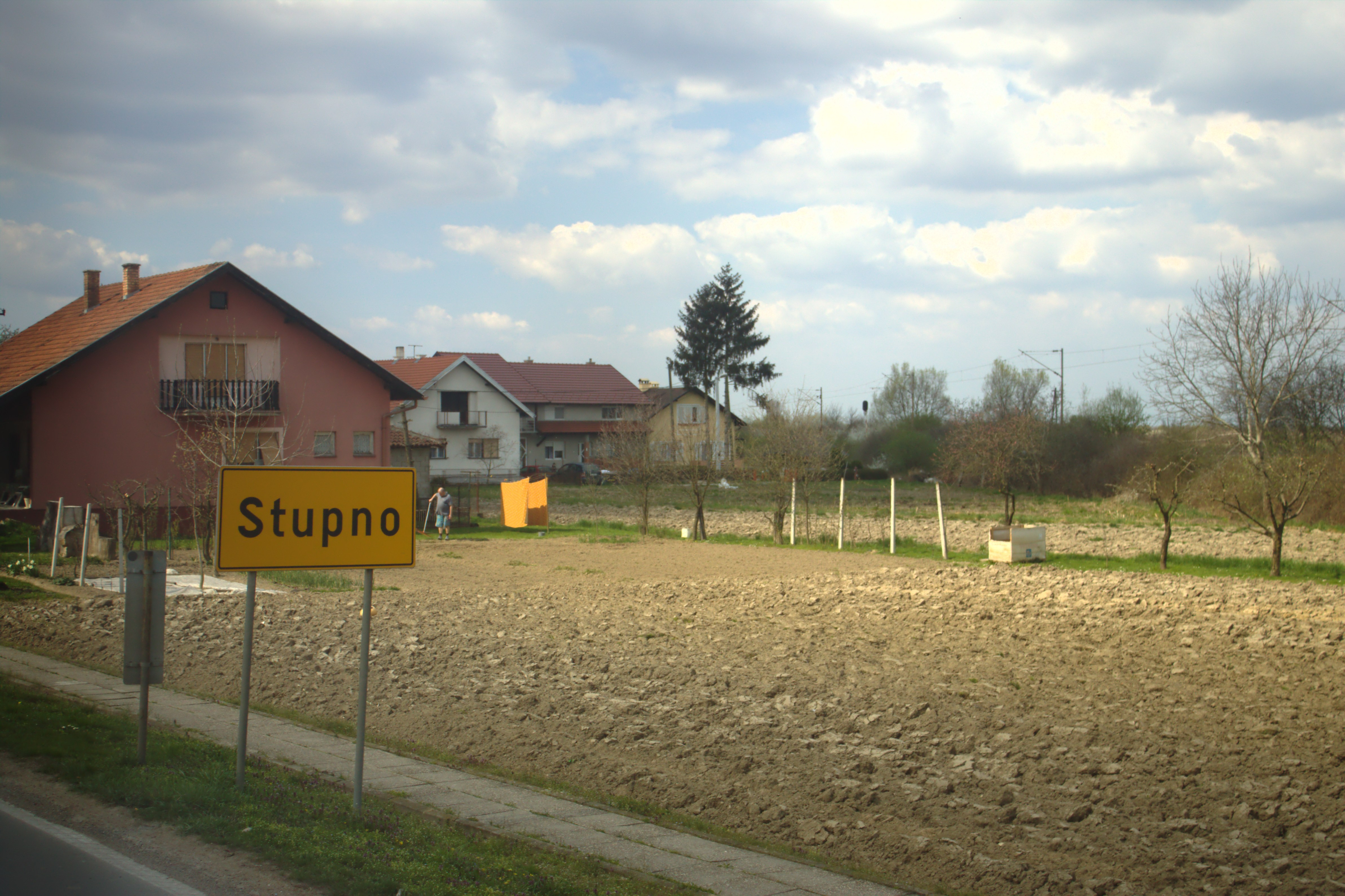
- Arrival to Stupno from south
- Interactive map of Stupno
- Country: Croatia
- County: Sisak-Moslavina County

Area
  - Total: 6.4 km^{2} (2.5 sq mi)

Population (2021)
  - Total: 427
  - Density: 67/km^{2} (170/sq mi)
- Time zone: UTC+1 (CET)
  - Summer (DST): UTC+2 (CEST)

Stupno is a village in Croatia. It is connected by the D36 highway.
