= Kravarsko =

- Municipality
- Municipality of Kravarsko
- Interactive map of Kravarsko
- Location of Kravarsko in Croatia
- Coordinates: 45°34′48″N 16°2′24″E
- Country: Croatia
- County: Zagreb County

Area
  - Municipality: 58.3 km^{2} (22.5 sq mi)
  - Urban: 5.8 km^{2} (2.2 sq mi)

Population (2021)
  - Municipality: 1,824
  - Density: 31.3/km^{2} (81.0/sq mi)
  - Urban: 510
  - Urban density: 88/km^{2} (230/sq mi)
- Time zone: UTC+1 (Central European Time)
- Vehicle registration: ZG
- Website: kravarsko.hr

Kravarsko is a municipality in Croatia in the Zagreb County.

In the 2011 census, there were 1,987 inhabitants, in the following settlements:

- Barbarići Kravarski, population 202
- Čakanec, population 68
- Donji Hruševec, population 332
- Gladovec Kravarski, population 199
- Gornji Hruševec, population 240
- Kravarsko, population 557
- Novo Brdo, population 77
- Podvornica, population 115
- Pustike, population 158
- Žitkovčica, population 39

In the same census, an absolute majority of population were Croats.
