= Bregana Pisarovinska =

Coordinates: 45°37′N 15°49′E

- Village
- Interactive map of Bregana Pisarovinska
- Country: Croatia
- County: Zagreb County

Area
  - Total: 5.5 km^{2} (2.1 sq mi)

Population (2021)
  - Total: 216
  - Density: 39/km^{2} (100/sq mi)
- Time zone: UTC+1 (CET)
  - Summer (DST): UTC+2 (CEST)

Bregana Pisarovinska is a village in Croatia.
