= Bratina =

Coordinates: 45°37′N 15°49′E

- Village
- Interactive map of Bratina
- Country: Croatia
- County: Zagreb County

Area
  - Total: 33.5 km^{2} (12.9 sq mi)

Population (2021)
  - Total: 677
  - Density: 20.2/km^{2} (52.3/sq mi)
- Time zone: UTC+1 (CET)
  - Summer (DST): UTC+2 (CEST)

Bratina is a village in Croatia, located in Pisarovina municipality in Zagreb County. In the 2001 Census its recorded population was 701. It is known for traditional costumes including horned headgear and necklaces with glass beads. It was the venue for the 16th IAU World Field Crossbow Championships in 2012.
