= Vurot =

Coordinates: 45°28′N 16°17′E

- Village
- Interactive map of Vurot
- Country: Croatia
- County: Sisak-Moslavina County

Area
  - Total: 2.5 km^{2} (0.97 sq mi)

Population (2021)
  - Total: 112
  - Density: 45/km^{2} (120/sq mi)
- Time zone: UTC+1 (CET)
  - Summer (DST): UTC+2 (CEST)

Vurot is a village in Croatia.
