= Gornji Hruševec =

- Village
- Location within Croatia
- Coordinates: 45°34′N 16°01′E
- Country: Croatia
- County: Zagreb County

Area
  - Total: 8.1 km^{2} (3.1 sq mi)

Population (2021)
  - Total: 179
  - Density: 22/km^{2} (57/sq mi)
- Time zone: UTC+1 (CET)
  - Summer (DST): UTC+2 (CEST)

Gornji Hruševec is a village in Croatia. It is connected by the D31 highway.

== History ==
In the village of Upper Hrusevec is a Roman archaeological site of "Ad Fines" (local called "Burgenland"). In the Middle Ages, Upper Hrusevec was noble Predij Hruševec, Hruševački ruled by nobles (lat. praedium Hrwssowcz).
