= Bratina (surname) =

Bratina is a surname. Notable people with the surname include:

- Bob Bratina (born 1944), Canadian broadcaster and politician
- Darko Bratina (1942–1997), Italian sociologist, film theorist and politician
- Milko Bratina (born 1939), Slovene architect
