= Gušće =

Coordinates: 45°25′34″N 16°34′55″E

- Village
- Interactive map of Gušće
- Country: Croatia
- County: Sisak-Moslavina County

Area
  - Total: 23.9 km^{2} (9.2 sq mi)

Population (2021)
  - Total: 288
  - Density: 12.1/km^{2} (31.2/sq mi)
- Time zone: UTC+1 (CET)
  - Summer (DST): UTC+2 (CEST)

Gušće is a village in Croatia.
