= Staro Pračno =

Coordinates: 45°29′20″N 16°20′51″E

- Village
- Interactive map of Staro Pračno
- Country: Croatia
- County: Sisak-Moslavina County

Area
  - Total: 4.1 km^{2} (1.6 sq mi)

Population (2021)
  - Total: 721
  - Density: 180/km^{2} (460/sq mi)
- Time zone: UTC+1 (CET)
  - Summer (DST): UTC+2 (CEST)

Staro Pračno is a village in Croatia.
