= Lukinić Brdo =

Coordinates: 45°34′N 15°56′E

- Village
- Interactive map of Lukinić Brdo
- Country: Croatia
- County: Zagreb County

Area
  - Total: 19.8 km^{2} (7.6 sq mi)

Population (2021)
  - Total: 287
  - Density: 14.5/km^{2} (37.5/sq mi)
- Time zone: UTC+1 (CET)
  - Summer (DST): UTC+2 (CEST)

Lukinić Brdo is a village in Croatia.
