= Lijevi Štefanki =

- Village
- Location within Croatia
- Coordinates: 45°31′N 15°56′E
- Country: Croatia
- County: Zagreb County

Area
  - Total: 9.1 km^{2} (3.5 sq mi)

Population (2021)
  - Total: 196
  - Density: 22/km^{2} (56/sq mi)
- Time zone: UTC+1 (CET)
  - Summer (DST): UTC+2 (CEST)

Lijevi Štefanki is a village in Zagreb County, in Croatia.

== Geography ==
It's located 42.5 km from the national capital, Zagreb.
