= Operation Stinger =

1991 offensive during the Croatian War of Independence

Coordinates: 45.106855°N 16.389531°E

- Part of the Croatian War of Independence
- Location of Glina and Struga in Croatia
Date	26–27 July 1991
Location	Banovina, Croatia
Result	SAO Krajina victory

Belligerents
(Republic of Serbian Krajina) SAO Krajina	Croatia

Commanders and leaders
(Republic of Serbian Krajina) Dragan Vasiljković (Republic of Serbian Krajina) Bogdan Vajagić	(Croatia) Mile Blažević †

Units involved
Kninjas	Croatian National Guard; Croatian Police

Casualties and losses
2 killed 1 wounded (Dragan Vasiljkovic claim)	14–39 killed
- 22 civilians killed

Operation Stinger (Croatian: Operacija Žalac; Serbian: Operacija Žaoka) was an offensive undertaken by the forces of the SAO Krajina, an unrecognized Croatian Serb region opposing the Republic of Croatia, against positions held by the Croatian police in the region of Banovina on 26–27 July 1991, during the Croatian War of Independence. It was primarily aimed at police stations in Glina and Kozibrod, as well as police-held positions in a string of villages between the town of Dvor and Kozibrod. In addition to Glina and Kozibrod, heavy fighting took place in the village of Struga, north of Dvor, where Croatian Serb forces employed a human shield consisting of Croat civilians taken from their homes in Struga and the nearby village of Zamlača.

The Croatian Serb rebels captured the police station in Glina, but were stopped in Struga before the Yugoslav People's Army (JNA) arrived there to create a buffer zone and, according to the JNA, assist the Croatian police to evacuate. On 29 July, as the non-Serb civilian population left Kozibrod and the villages to the south of it, the police station in Kozibrod was evacuated as well. The fighting resulted the bulk of the region being transferred to Croatian Serb and JNA control.

In the aftermath of the fighting, a number of Croatian Serb troops threatened the regional commander in Dvor, blaming him for the deaths of members of their unit in the fighting. Afterwards, they killed several Croat civilians who were undergoing treatment at the Dvor medical centre. Croatian authorities filed war crime charges against Dragan Vasiljković, specifically for leading the attack in Glina which resulted in civilian deaths, as well as injuring and killing prisoners of war. Vasiljković was arrested in Australia in 2006, and was extradited to Croatia on 8 July 2015 after losing his thirteenth appeal and sentenced to 15 years in prison on 26 September 2017 by the County Court in the city of Split. He was released from prison in March 2020.

== Background ==
In 1990, ethnic tensions between Serbs and Croats worsened after the electoral defeat of the government of the Socialist Republic of Croatia by the Croatian Democratic Union (Croatian: Hrvatska demokratska zajednica – HDZ). The Yugoslav People's Army (Serbian: Jugoslovenska Narodna Armija – JNA) confiscated Croatia's Territorial Defence (Croatian: Teritorijalna obrana – TO) weapons to minimize resistance. On 17 August, the tensions escalated into an open revolt of the Croatian Serbs, centred on the predominantly Serb-populated areas of the Dalmatian hinterland around Knin (approximately 60 kilometres (37 miles) north-east of Split), parts of the Lika, Kordun, Banovina and eastern Croatia. In January 1991, Serbia, supported by Montenegro and Serbia's provinces of Vojvodina and Kosovo, unsuccessfully tried to obtain the Yugoslav Presidency's approval for a JNA operation to disarm Croatian security forces. The request was denied and a bloodless skirmish between Serb insurgents and Croatian special police in March prompted the JNA itself to ask the Federal Presidency to give it wartime authority and declare a state of emergency. Even though the request was backed by Serbia and its allies, the JNA request was refused on 15 March. Serbian President Slobodan Milošević, preferring a campaign to expand Serbia rather than to preserve Yugoslavia with Croatia as a federal unit, publicly threatened to replace the JNA with a Serbian army and declared that he no longer recognized the authority of the federal Presidency. The threat caused the JNA to abandon plans to preserve Yugoslavia in favour of expansion of Serbia as the JNA came under Milošević's control. By the end of March, the conflict had escalated with the first fatalities. In early April, leaders of the Serb revolt in Croatia declared their intention to amalgamate the areas under their control with Serbia. These were viewed by the Government of Croatia as breakaway regions.

At the beginning of 1991, Croatia had no regular army. To bolster its defence, Croatia doubled its police numbers to about 20,000. The most effective part of the Croatian police force was 3,000-strong special police comprising twelve battalions organised along military lines. There were also 9,000–10,000 regionally organised reserve police in 16 battalions and 10 companies, but they lacked weapons. In response to the deteriorating situation, the Croatian government established the Croatian National Guard (Croatian: Zbor narodne garde – ZNG) in May by expanding the special police battalions into four all-professional guards brigades. Under Ministry of Defence control and commanded by retired JNA General Martin Špegelj, the four guards brigades comprised approximately 8,000 troops. The reserve police, also expanded to 40,000, was attached to the ZNG and reorganised into 19 brigades and 14 independent battalions. The guards brigades were the only units of the ZNG that were fully equipped with small arms; throughout the ZNG there was a lack of heavier weapons and there was poor command and control structure above the brigade level. The shortage of heavy weapons was so severe that the ZNG resorted to using World War II weapons taken from museums and film studios. At the time, the Croatian weapon stockpile consisted of 30,000 small arms purchased abroad and 15,000 previously owned by the police. To replace the personnel lost to the guards brigades, a new 10,000-strong special police was established.

== Prelude ==
Map of Banovina (modern county lines provided for reference)

In June, the conflict escalated in the region of Banovina, which had been declared a part of the Serbian Autonomous Oblast Krajina (SAO Krajina) by that time. Three municipalities in the region—Dvor, Glina and Hrvatska Kostajnica—had predominantly Serb populations, although all of them were inhabited by a substantial number of non-Serbs as well. On 24 June, the Sisak police administration set up a new police station in the village of Kozibrod in the Una River valley, along the Dvor–Hrvatska Kostajnica road. It was manned by two platoons of police and ZNG troops drawn from the Sisak company of the 2nd Guards Brigade. The new station drew a strong reaction from the SAO Krajina authorities, who issued an ultimatum on the same day the police station was set up, demanded its removal and threatened to remove it by force unless Croatia complied with their ultimatum.

On the night of 25/26 June, SAO Krajina forces took control of the police station in Dvor and attacked the police station in Glina. The rebels managed to capture the police station in Glina for less than an hour before they were pushed back by the Lučko Anti-Terrorist Unit and police reinforcements deployed from Sisak. Croatian police casualties amounted to one killed and six wounded. Even though the attack in Glina did not leave SAO Krajina in control of the police station in Glina, 16 Croatian policemen were captured and held hostage. The prisoners were taken to the Knin camp and a detention facility in Golubić. In response to the fighting, the JNA deployed its troops to the two towns. New fighting erupted the same day near Hrvatska Kostajnica. In the final days of June, many Serb civilians, especially from Dvor, fled to the area of Bosanski Novi for safety. By 28 June, only a few women, children and the elderly remained in Glina. The town's shops were closed and its streets were patrolled by JNA armoured vehicles. After the fighting, the JNA positioned its troops around the police station, while the Croatian Serb rebels controlled the rest of the town.

In mid-July, Dragan Vasiljković was deployed from the Croatian Serb capital Knin to Banovina to coordinate rebel forces there. By 21 July, his work was commended by local commanders, and two days later, a regional command of Croatian Serb forces was announced at a meeting in Dvor attended by Milan Martić, one of the most prominent SAO Krajina leaders. On 24 July, one day after the regional command was established, the Serb rebels adopted a military plan, presented by Vasiljković, aimed at removing Croatian forces from Banovina. On 25 July, 14 mortar rounds were fired at the Kozibrod police station. Nobody was injured in the attack, and in its aftermath, SAO Krajina authorities requested a ceasefire until 10 August because of the harvest.

== Timeline ==
The offensive, codenamed Operation Stinger (Serbian: Operacija Žaoka) was primarily aimed at the Croat-populated villages between Dvor and Hrvatska Kostajnica, and the police station in the town of Glina. The forces earmarked for the offensive were elements of the 7th Banija Division of the SAO Krajina TO, spearheaded by special police deployed from Knin and commanded by Vasiljković. The operation commenced on 26 July at 10:00 with an hour-long mortar bombardment of Glina, Kostajnica and Topusko. Vasiljković set up his headquarters in the Šamarica area of Zrinska Gora, situated between Glina, Dvor, Hrvatska Kostajnica and Petrinja.

=== Glina ===
The ground offensive in Glina commenced with a single SAO Krajina soldier tasked with firing on a JNA armoured vehicle from an area close to the police station. This attempted false flag attack was designed to make the vehicle crew believe that they were being fired on by the Croatian police, inducing them to fire at the police station. The original shooter was observed by the police and shot at from the station, which was in turn fired upon by the JNA. A JNA colonel at the scene then threatened to use force against the Serb rebels unless they left the scene. Following consultations with Vasiljković, the SAO Krajina forces moved on towards Viduševac, where they shot at a number of civilian buildings including a school and a church, before turning to approach the police station from a different direction. The assault, supported by mortar fire, continued until the following day. The police station was captured on 27 July at 11:08. According to SAO Krajina military reports, 27 Croatian military and police personnel were killed in the fighting. Croatian sources reported the deaths of two policemen and the wounding of two others, as well as the deaths of two civilians, including a German journalist killed by sniper fire. The killed journalist, Egon Scotland, a reporter of the Süddeutsche Zeitung, was leaving Glina with a fellow reporter in a clearly marked car, when he was fatally wounded. The same source indicates that the remaining Croatian police officers managed to pull out of Glina to Viduševac.

=== Una River valley ===
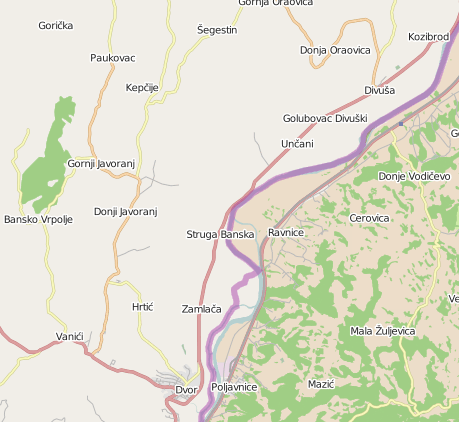
Map of the Una River valley from Dvor to Kozibrod; The purple line bisecting the map represents the international border between Croatia (left) and Bosnia and Herzegovina (right)

The advance against Croat-held villages along the Una was also preceded by an hour-long mortar bombardment of the area. More than 250 rounds were fired, commencing on 26 July at 10:00, after which the infantry was ordered to advance. The attacking force consisted of 50 SAO Krajina special forces troops drawn from Knin, 50 policemen and 700 conscripts. The JNA estimated that there were about 240–280 Croatian police and ZNG personnel deployed in the area from Struga to Kozibrod. The SAO Krajina plan saw a battalion led by Braco Orlović advancing north from Dvor through the village of Zamlača to approach the village of Struga. Once there, it was to maintain its position and advance gradually if possible. Additional forces were meant to outflank and pin down the Croatian defending force: a platoon of special forces led by Nikola Sundać, reinforced by a platoon of conscripts, was tasked with bypassing Struga and interdicting traffic along the road between the village of Unčani and Struga, preventing any access from the direction of Kozibrod. Another special forces platoon led by Željko Sanader was tasked with seizing the villages of Volinja and Kuljani before advancing towards Kozibrod, while the second battalion attached to the attacking force—led by Mićo Popović—engaged Croatian troops near Divuša, Golubovac Divuški and Kozibrod.

After Orlović's battalion entered the undefended village of Zamlača, the Serb rebels moved from one house to the next, ransacking homes and forcing any civilians they found to move to the main road. Approximately 50 civilians were captured in the village, they were then forced to walk in front of an armed vehicle towards Struga, forming a human shield. By 13:00, all the units earmarked for the advance between Dvor and Kozibrod had achieved their initial objectives, except for the platoon commanded by Sundać. By 14:30, Struga was under attack. The defending force in Struga was first engaged by the outflanking force and had no knowledge of what had happened in Zamlača. As the human shield and the SAO Krajina force reached Struga, the defending troops were reluctant to fire against them. As a consequence, three Croatian policemen deployed in one house were surrounded and subsequently surrendered. Their captors stripped them, ordered them to run and then killed them. Unsure how to deal with the situation, the Croatian forces withdrew from the southern part of the village. The unit protected by the human shield moved very slowly and took six hours to move from Zamlača to the centre of Struga.

The armed vehicle and the soldiers following the human shield were ambushed in the centre of Struga by a single policeman and a civilian who threw a hand grenade and ran towards the vehicle, carrying three more hand grenades strapped to his waist. As the hand grenades exploded, gunfire erupted allowing the civilians held as human shields to run away. The policeman and civilian who carried out the ambush were both killed; sources identify the two as reserve policeman Mile Blažević and traffic policeman Željko Filipović. Shortly before 16:00, the Croatian forces counterattacked, causing the bulk of Popović's troops to flee. Popović and his remaining five or six soldiers retreated. At least five SAO Krajina troops were killed and twenty wounded in fighting in Struga. By 18:00, the battalion led by Orlović had lost 80 percent of its personnel to desertion. Prompted by the desertions and heavy shooting in Struga at 19:00, Bogdan Vajagić, the commanding officer of the SAO Krajina units subordinated to the Dvor headquarters, requested that the JNA intervene. The JNA informed Vajagić that a unit was dispatched from Petrinja, allowing him to break off further fighting with the Croatian police and send two platoons as reinforcements to Glina as reinforcements at Vasiljković's request. JNA tanks reached Struga at 19:50 to establish a buffer zone. Croatian forces there offered to leave the village if the JNA provided them with one armoured personnel carrier and escorted them to Hrvatska Kostajnica. The JNA complied with the request. During the fighting, 12 Croatian policemen were killed, along with 20 civilians.

== Aftermath ==
Fighting continued around Topusko, which was besieged by the Serb rebels on 28 July. The same day, heavy fighting also erupted near Hrvatska Kostajnica and Hrvatska Dubica. In Dvor, Sundać and several soldiers from his platoon arrived at the regional SAO Krajina military headquarters threatening the commanding officer, holding him responsible for losses the platoon had suffered in the fighting. The group also demanded that the authorities turn any prisoners over to them, but the demand was refused. Finally, they went to the medical centre in Dvor, where they forced eight wounded Croat civilians and two policemen, out of the building and beat them in front of 100 onlookers. There are conflicting reports that all ten were killed, or that only an unspecified number of female patients were killed. On 29 July, the remaining Croatian civilian population in Struga, Unčani, Divuša and Golubovac Divuški accepted an offer made by the JNA to evacuate them to Hrvatska Kostajnica. When the column of evacuating civilians reached Kozibrod, the population of that village also joined them, followed by the police and ZNG troops stationed in Kozibrod. The move left the SAO Krajina and the JNA in control of the bulk of Banovina.

=== Further combat ===
Fighting in the region flared once more on 7 August, with new clashes around Hrvatska Kostajnica and an artillery bombardment of Topusko. On 14 August, the policemen captured in the first attack against the police station in Glina in June were released in a prisoner exchange. Croatian troops and positions held in Hrvatska Kostajnica, as well as in Petrinja and Sisak, were inspected by Croatian President Franjo Tuđman on 25 August. The Croatian position in the region deteriorated further on 9 September when Hrvatska Kostajnica was besieged. Three days later, SAO Krajina forces captured the hill that commanded the town, and the Croatian forces started a breakout from Hrvatska Kostajnica. On 13 September, Hrvatska Kostajnica was captured by SAO Krajina forces, after heavy attacks supported by JNA artillery and tanks forced approximately 300 Croatian troops to retreat or surrender. The capture of the town was followed by killings, looting and torching of buildings in the town and the surrounding villages. A total of 67 Croatian troops were captured in the town and shipped to the jail in Glina, but none arrived. The SAO Krajina forces captured Hrvatska Dubica the same day, and of Topusko on 14 September. On 21 September, Petrinja was captured by SAO Krajina forces and the JNA, denying Croatia an important bridgehead on the south (right) bank of the Kupa River. The town's capture came approximately one month after Martić announced SAO Krajina's plans to control it.

By the end of the month, the Serb rebels and the JNA controlled nearly all of the southern bank of the river, and the lines of control in the region largely stabilised. Before the ceasefire of 3 January 1992, which implemented the Vance plan, the Serb rebels and the JNA made two more unsuccessful attempts to push back the Croatian forces in the region. These attacks comprised the autumn campaign undertaken by the JNA—in the area of Slana and Novi Farkašić on 17–18 October and in the area of Sunja on 2 November. In the same period, the ZNG launched an unsuccessful offensive codenamed Operation Whirlwind to recapture Glina on 11–13 December. The 120 Croats who remained in the area of Dubica faced persecution, culminating in the Baćin massacre of more than 50 Croats on 21 October, and the rounding up and expulsion of the remainder on 20 November.

=== Charges of war crimes ===
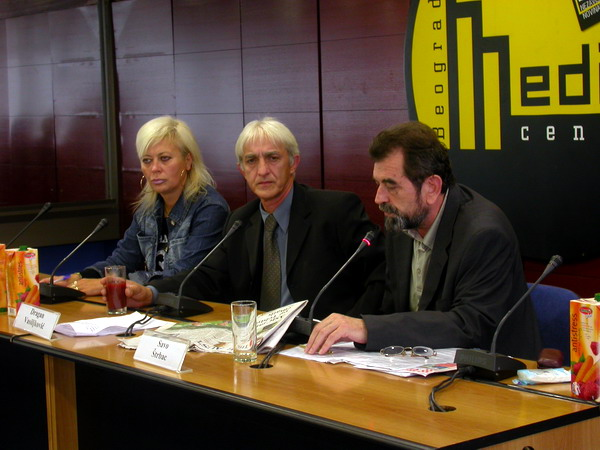
Dragan Vasiljković (centre) pictured in 2005 in Belgrade

According to Australian court documents, on 10 January 2006, the Šibenik County Court ordered that a warrant be issued for Vasiljković's arrest. The offences listed were two alleged war crimes against prisoners of war, and one alleged war crime against the civilian population. The latter are related to his role in the attack on Glina which caused civilian deaths and injuries. He was arrested in Australia in 2006, but as an Australian national, he appealed against extradition to Croatia claiming that he would not get a fair trial there. The appeal was granted by the Federal Court in 2009, and Vasiljković was released. However, the High Court of Australia overturned the decision and Vasiljković was arrested after a 43-day search for him by the police. Subsequently, Vasiljković appealed against his extradition citing other grounds. His extradition was approved by the Minister for Home Affairs Jason Clare in November 2012, however Vasiljković appealed that decision as well. In December 2014, the Federal Court upheld Clare's decision.

In 1994, Croatian authorities tried Đuro Đurić, a former SAO Krajina policeman, in absentia on charges of war crimes committed in Struga, Zamlača and Kozibrod. He was convicted and sentenced to twenty years in prison. Đurić surrendered to the Croatian police at the border crossing in Dvor in 2001. After two months in custody, he was released and left the country. Đurić returned to Croatia in February 2009, when he was arrested once again on identical charges. One month later, he was released after witnesses were questioned and failed to link him to the war crimes of which he was accused.

=== War reporting legacy ===
Scotland travelled to the region to investigate the disappearance of a fellow journalist who was thought to have been detained by Croatian Serb forces and assist her. His death in the line of duty, while seeking to help a fellow reporter, had a significant impact on the German media and German public opinion. Scotland's death reinforced the image of the conflict as a real war where no rules were obeyed. Spurred on by his death, Munich-based journalists established the "Journalists help Journalists" (German: Journalisten helfen Journalisten) association in 1993 to help reporters the way Scotland had intended when he was killed. Scotland's death also provided the impetus to establish German section of Reporters Without Borders in 1994.
