= D47 road (Croatia) =

Road in Croatia

D47 state road

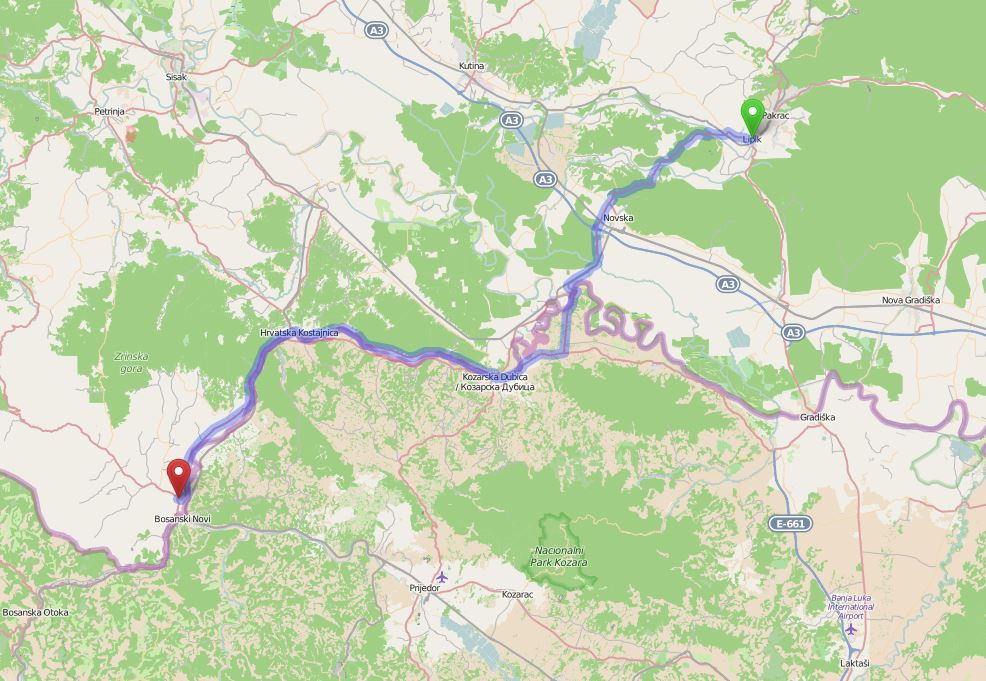

Route information
- Length: 94.5 km (58.7 mi)

Major junctions
- From: D5 in Lipik
- D312 in Novska; A3 in Novska interchange D30 in Hrvatska Kostajnica
- To: D6 in Dvor

Location
- Country: Croatia
- Counties: Požega-Slavonia, Sisak-Moslavina
- Major cities: Lipik, Novska, Hrvatska Kostajnica

Highway system
- Highways in Croatia

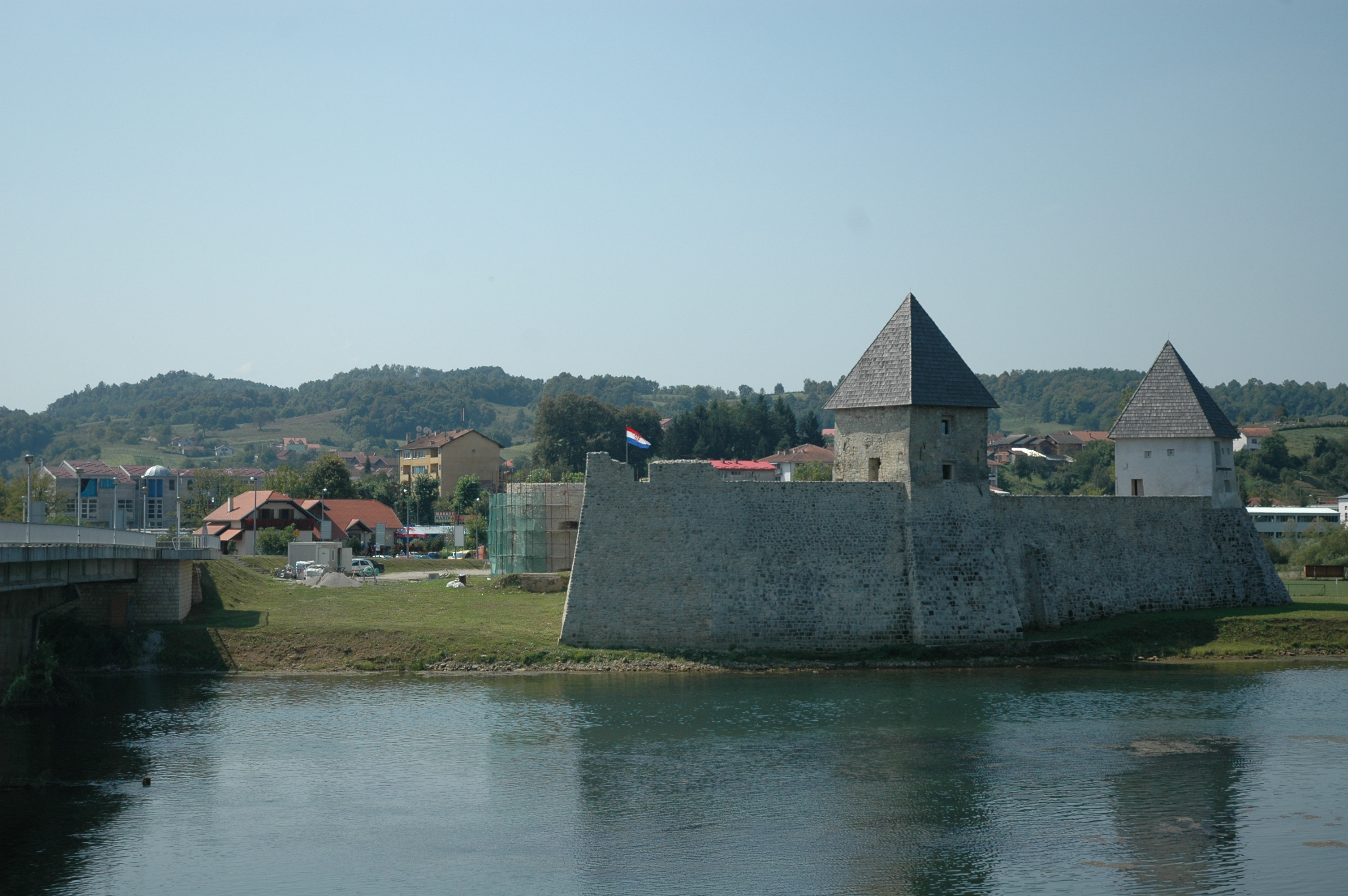
Hrvatska Kostajnica fortress, next to the D47 road

D47 is a state road in central Croatia connecting Lipik, Novska and Una River valley area to Croatian motorway network at the A3 motorway Novska interchange and to the D6 state road in Dvor. The road is 94.5 km (58.7 mi) long.

Th D47 and indeed all state roads in Croatia are managed and maintained by Hrvatske ceste, state owned company.

== Traffic volume ==
Traffic is regularly counted and reported by Hrvatske ceste, operator of the road.

D47 traffic volume
Road	Counting site	AADT	ASDT	Notes
D47	3402 Dobrovac	801	812	Adjacent to the Ž4236 junction.
D47	3306 Bročice	1,896	2,548	Adjacent to the Ž3250 junction.
D47	3308 Slabinja	930	1,151	Adjacent to the Ž3264 junction.
D47	3207 Hrvatska Kostajnica - west	946	1,076	Adjacent to the D30 junction.

== Road junctions and populated areas ==
D47 junctions/populated areas
Type	Slip roads/Notes
	Lipik; D5 to Pakrac and Daruvar (to the north) and to Okučani (to the south). The northern terminus of the road.
	Dobrovac; Ž4236 to Kukunjevac, Gaj and Poljana.
	Ž4112 to Jagma and Subocka.
	Korita
	Bair
	Ž3217 to Kozarice.
	Novska; D312 to Novska city centre. Ž3124 to Banova Jaruga.
	A3 motorway in Novska interchange to Zagreb (to the west) and to Slavonski Brod (to the east).
	Ž3250 to Bročice and Novska (D312).
	Ž3253 to Košutarica and Mlaka.
	Jasenovac; Ž3209 to Puska and Gušće.
	Uštica
	Tanac
	Hrvatska Dubica; Ž3294 to Sunja (D224) (to the north) and Hrvatska Dubica border crossing to Bosnia and Herzegovina (to the south).
	Slabinja
	Ž3264 to Utolica and Šaš.
	Hrvatska Kostajnica; D30 to Petrinja (to the north) and to Hrvatska Kostajnica border crossing to Bosnia and Herzegovina (to the south).
	Kuljani
	Kozibrod
	Divuša; Ž3263 to Gornja Oraovica and Zrin.
	Golubovac Divuški
	Unčani
	Struga Banska
	Zamlača
	Dvor; D6 to Glina and Karlovac (to the west) and to Dvor border crossing to Bosnia and Herzegovina (to the south). The southern terminus of the road.
