= Oraovica =

Oraovica may refer to:

- Oraovica, Radoviš, a village in the municipality of Radoviš, North Macedonia
- Oraovica (at Crkovnica), a village in the municipality of Leskovac, Serbia
- Oraovica (at Grdelica), a village in the municipality of Leskovac, Serbia
- Oraovica (Preševo), a village in the municipality of Preševo, Serbia
- Oraovica (Zvečan) (sr), a village in the municipality of Zvečan
- Oraovica (Kosovska Kamenica) (sr), a village in the municipality of Kosovska Kamenica

or:

- Gornja Oraovica, a village in the municipality of Dvor, Croatia
- Donja Oraovica, a village in the municipality of Dvor, Croatia

== See also ==
- Orahovica (disambiguation)
