= Subocka =

Subocka may refer to:

- Subocka, Lipik, a village in Croatia
- Nova Subocka, a village near Novska, Croatia
- Stara Subocka, a village near Novska
- Subocka (river), a tributary of the Veliki Strug
