= D312 road =

State road in Croatia

D312 state road

Route information
- Length: 1.79 km (1.11 mi)

Major junctions
- From: D47 in Brestača
- To: Novska

Location
- Country: Croatia
- Counties: Sisak-Moslavina
- Major cities: Novska

Highway system
- Highways in Croatia

D312 is a state road in the western Slavonia region of Croatia connecting the D47 road in Brestača to the centre of Novska. The road is 1.79 km (1.11 mi) long.

This and all other state roads in Croatia are managed and maintained by Hrvatske ceste, state owned company.

== Road junctions and populated areas ==
D312 junctions
Type	Slip roads/Notes
	D47 to Lipik (to the northeast) and A3 motorway Novska interchange and Jasenovac (to the south). Ž3124 to Lipovljani (to the northwest) The western terminus of the road.
	Novska; Ž3250 to Bročice (to the south); Ž3252 to Okučani (D5) (to the east); The eastern terminus of the road.

== See also ==
- A3 motorway
