= Paklenica (disambiguation) =

Paklenica is a protected area and a river in Zadar County, Croatia.

Paklenica may also refer to:

- Starigrad Paklenica, a village near the national park in Zadar County
- Paklenica, Sisak-Moslavina County, a village near Novska, Croatia
- Gornja Paklenica, a village near Doboj, Bosnia and Herzegovina
- Donja Paklenica, a village near Doboj, Bosnia and Herzegovina

== See also ==
- Peklenica
