= Orahovica (disambiguation) =

Orahovica may refer to:

== Bosnia and Herzegovina ==
- Orahovica (Hadžići)
- Orahovica (Konjic)
- Orahovica (Lukavac)
- Orahovica (Srebrenica)
- Orahovica, Zenica
- Orahovica, Žepče

== Croatia ==
- Orahovica
- Orahovica Monastery

== Montenegro ==
- Orahovica, Montenegro

== See also ==
- Orehovica (disambiguation)
- Oraovica (disambiguation)
