= Rajčići =

Rajčići may refer to:

- Rajčići, Bosnia and Herzegovina, a village near Visoko
- Rajčići, Croatia, a village near Novska

== See also ==
- Rajčić
