= Zut =

Zut may refer to:

- Žut, an island in Croatia
- Zut, Sisak-Moslavina County, a village near Dvor, Croatia
- Zut!, Canadian comedy series
- zut or zut alors, a French phrase
