= Kričke =

Kričke may refer:

- Kričke, Šibenik-Knin County, a village near Drniš, Croatia
- Kričke, Požega-Slavonia County, a village near Pakrac, Croatia
- Kričke, Sisak-Moslavina County, a village near Novska, Croatia
