= Tanac =

Tanac may refer to

- The Hebrew Bible
- Tanac, Croatia, a village
- Joyce Tanac (born 1950), American gymnast
