= Zamlača =

Zamlača may refer to:

- Zamlača, Sisak-Moslavina County, a village near Dvor, Croatia
- Zamlača, Varaždin County, a village near Vidovec, Croatia
