= Rujevac =

Rujevac may refer to:

- Rujevac, Serbia, a village near Ljubovija
- Rujevac, Croatia, a village near Dvor

== See also ==
- Rujevica (disambiguation)
