= Popovac, Sisak-Moslavina County =

Settlement in Sisak-Moslavina County, Croatia

Popovac
- Settlement
- Interactive map of Popovac
- Location of Popovac in Croatia
- Coordinates: 45°22′41″N 17°02′42″E
- Country: Croatia
- County: Sisak-Moslavina
- City: Novska

Area
  - Total: 3.4 km^{2} (1.3 sq mi)

Population (2021)
  - Total: 6
  - Density: 1.8/km^{2} (4.6/sq mi)
- Time zone: UTC+1 (CET)
  - Summer (DST): UTC+2 (CEST)
- Postal code: 44330 Novska
- Area code: +385 (0)44

Popovac is a settlement in the City of Novska in Croatia. In 2021, its population was 6.

== Demographics ==
Popovac: Population trends 1857–2021
v

population				156					130	120	105	88	76	53	7	10	6
	1857	1869	1880	1890	1900	1910	1921	1931	1948	1953	1961	1971	1981	1991	2001	2011	2021

Sources: Croatian Bureau of Statistics publications
