= Voćarica =

Settlement in Sisak-Moslavina County, Croatia

- Settlement
- Interactive map of Voćarica
- Location of Voćarica in Croatia
- Coordinates: 45°19′12″N 17°02′31″E
- Country: Croatia
- County: Sisak-Moslavina
- City: Novska

Area
  - Total: 9.6 km^{2} (3.7 sq mi)

Population (2021)
  - Total: 146
  - Density: 15/km^{2} (39/sq mi)
- Time zone: UTC+1 (CET)
  - Summer (DST): UTC+2 (CEST)
- Postal code: 44330 Novska
- Area code: +385 (0)44

Voćarica is a settlement in the City of Novska in Croatia. In 2021, its population was 146.

== Demographics ==
Voćarica: Population trends 1857–2021
v

population	173	150	169	206	203	246	221	266	167	191	217	234	256	269	207	199	146
	1857	1869	1880	1890	1900	1910	1921	1931	1948	1953	1961	1971	1981	1991	2001	2011	2021

Sources: Croatian Bureau of Statistics publications
