= Matijevići, Sisak-Moslavina County =

Matijevići Матијевићи (Serbian)
- Village
- Location of Matijevici in Croatia
- Coordinates: 45°03′09″N 16°22′15″E
- Country: Croatia
- Region: Continental Croatia (Banovina)
- County: Sisak-Moslavina
- Municipality: Dvor

Area
  - Total: 2.3 km^{2} (0.89 sq mi)

Population (2021)
  - Total: 352
  - Density: 150/km^{2} (400/sq mi)
- Time zone: UTC+1 (CET)
  - Summer (DST): UTC+2 (CEST)

Matijevići is a village in central Croatia, in the municipality of Dvor, Sisak-Moslavina County. It is connected by the D6 highway.

== Demographics ==
According to the 2011 census, the village of Matijevići has 645 inhabitants. This represents 76.42% of its pre-war population according to the 1991 census.

The 1991 census recorded that 94.79% of the village population were ethnic Serbs (800/844), 2.01% were Yugoslavs (17/844), 0.71% were ethnic Croats (6/844), while 2.49% were of other ethnic origin (21/844).

Historical population 1857-2011
v

population	132	103	103	155	160	219	232	225	295	320	412	581	728	844	421	645	367
	1857	1869	1880	1890	1900	1910	1921	1931	1948	1953	1961	1971	1981	1991	2001	2011	2021

Sources: Croatian Bureau of Statistics publications
