= Dvor massacre =

1995 mass killing in Dvor, Croatia

- Location: Dvor, Croatia
- Date: 8 August 1995
- Target: 8 Croatian Serbs and 1 Croat
- Attack type: Mass killing
- Deaths: 9

The Dvor massacre was the execution of 9 disabled and elderly civilians on 8 August 1995 in the village of Dvor in the aftermath of Operation Storm.

== Killings ==
Due to the bombing on the first day of Croatia's Operation Storm, August 4, 1995, residents from a nursing home and patients from a psychiatric ward were evacuated from the village of Petrinja to Dvor. They were transferred to a school surrounded by UNPROFOR peacekeepers. By 7 August, most of the patients left the school but some were left behind as they either could not leave or had no one to assist them.

Croatian soldiers moved into Dvor on late afternoon and intercepted a convoy of refugees leading to a skirmish between Krajina Serb and Croatian forces. The pathway through the village was vital as it was an escape route for tens of thousands of Serb refugees. By 8 August, a Krajina Serb counter attack led the Croatians to retreat outside the town, though it is unclear who controlled the area around the school. On 8 August, a group of unidentified assailants entered the village and took the patients to the main hall of the school and executed them. Initially the Bosnian Army was suspected as they were involved in two attacks on Serb refugee convoys in villages near Dvor, but subsequent reports confirmed they were not present at the village prior to 10 August.

A Danish U.N. peacekeeping force under the command of Jorgen Kold who had been stationed in Dvor watched the massacre unfold through the large shattered windows of the school. Kold defended his unit's failure to act by saying that they were instructed not to leave the camp or interfere. "I didn't know that it was an impending massacre," he said, explaining that he could only have acted in "self-defence". At the time of the massacre, both Croatian and Serbian forces were in the vicinity of Dvor, but neither side has admitted to the killings. According to Kold, his unit observed at least three Croatian soldiers with baseball caps and backpacks, near the camp on the morning of the massacre and "either they're covering it up, or someone doesn't want to remember".

== Documentary ==
In 2015, a documentary on the massacre entitled 15 minutes - The Dvor Massacre was released, directed by Kasper Vedsmand and Georg Larsen.
