= Donji Javoranj =

Donji Javoranj Доњи Јаворањ (in Serbian)
- Village
- Location within Croatia
- Coordinates: 45°7′1.77″N 16°21′49.34″E
- Country: Croatia
- Region: Continental Croatia (Banovina)
- County: Sisak-Moslavina
- Municipality: Dvor

Area
  - Total: 3.4 sq mi (8.8 km^{2})

Population (2021)
  - Total: 50
  - Density: 15/sq mi (5.7/km^{2})
- Time zone: UTC+1 (CET)
  - Summer (DST): UTC+2 (CEST)

Donji Javoranj (Serbian Cyrillic: Доњи Јаворањ) is a village in Croatia.
