= Lovska =

Settlement in Sisak-Moslavina County, Croatia

- Settlement
- Interactive map of Lovska
- Location of Lovska in Croatia
- Coordinates: 45°24′36″N 17°02′38″E
- Country: Croatia
- County: Sisak-Moslavina
- City: Novska

Area
  - Total: 12.9 km^{2} (5.0 sq mi)

Population (2021)
  - Total: 10
  - Density: 0.78/km^{2} (2.0/sq mi)
- Time zone: UTC+1 (CET)
  - Summer (DST): UTC+2 (CEST)
- Postal code: 44330 Novska
- Area code: +385 (0)44

Lovska is a settlement in the City of Novska in Croatia. In 2021, its population was 10.

== Demographics ==
Lovska: Population trends 1857–2021
v

population	276	265	301	389	480	486	496	481	441	445	427	319	275	228	11	9	10
	1857	1869	1880	1890	1900	1910	1921	1931	1948	1953	1961	1971	1981	1991	2001	2011	2021

Sources: Croatian Bureau of Statistics publications
