= Plesmo =

Settlement in Sisak-Moslavina County, Croatia

- Settlement
- Interactive map of Plesmo
- Location of Plesmo in Croatia
- Coordinates: 45°18′58″N 16°50′17″E
- Country: Croatia
- County: Sisak-Moslavina
- City: Novska

Area
  - Total: 17.7 km^{2} (6.8 sq mi)

Population (2021)
  - Total: 58
  - Density: 3.3/km^{2} (8.5/sq mi)
- Time zone: UTC+1 (CET)
  - Summer (DST): UTC+2 (CEST)
- Postal code: 44330 Novska
- Area code: +385 (0)44

Plesmo is a settlement in the City of Novska in Croatia. In 2021, its population was 58.

== Demographics ==
Plesmo: Population trends 1857–2021
v

population	416	442	422	431	465	621	419	496	404	354	276	177	136	108	86	87	58
	1857	1869	1880	1890	1900	1910	1921	1931	1948	1953	1961	1971	1981	1991	2001	2011	2021

Sources: Croatian Bureau of Statistics publications
