= Borovac, Croatia =

Settlement in Sisak-Moslavina County, Croatia

Borovac
- Settlement
- Interactive map of Borovac
- Location of Borovac in Croatia
- Coordinates: 45°17′20″N 17°11′06″E
- Country: Croatia
- County: Sisak-Moslavina
- City: Novska

Area
  - Total: 10.7 km^{2} (4.1 sq mi)

Population (2021)
  - Total: 176
  - Density: 16.4/km^{2} (42.6/sq mi)
- Time zone: UTC+1 (CET)
  - Summer (DST): UTC+2 (CEST)
- Postal code: 44330 Novska
- Area code: +385 (0)44

Borovac is a settlement in the City of Novska in Croatia. In 2021, its population was 176.

== Demographics ==
Borovac: Population trends 1857–2021
v

population	481	448	519	706	837	941	861	895	860	854	810	771	743	656	309	273	176
	1857	1869	1880	1890	1900	1910	1921	1931	1948	1953	1961	1971	1981	1991	2001	2011	2021

Sources: Croatian Bureau of Statistics publications
