= Rujevica =

Rujevica can refer to:

- Rujevica, Rijeka, Croatia
  - Stadion Rujevica
- Rujevica, Pljevlja, a village in Montenegro
- Rujevica (Sokobanja), a village in Serbia

== See also ==
- Rujevac (disambiguation)
