= Jazavica =

Settlement in Sisak-Moslavina County, Croatia

- Settlement
- Interactive map of Jazavica
- Location of Jazavica in Croatia
- Coordinates: 45°19′05″N 17°02′31″E
- Country: Croatia
- County: Sisak-Moslavina
- City: Novska

Area
  - Total: 12.9 km^{2} (5.0 sq mi)

Population (2021)
  - Total: 327
  - Density: 25.3/km^{2} (65.7/sq mi)
- Time zone: UTC+1 (CET)
  - Summer (DST): UTC+2 (CEST)
- Postal code: 44330 Novska
- Area code: +385 (0)44

Jazavica is a settlement in the City of Novska in Croatia. In 2021, its population was 327.

== Demographics ==
Jazavica: Population trends 1857–2021
v

population	472	458	463	535	580	718	623	643	602	609	613	606	615	559	429	398	327
	1857	1869	1880	1890	1900	1910	1921	1931	1948	1953	1961	1971	1981	1991	2001	2011	2021

Sources: Croatian Bureau of Statistics publications
