= Roždanik =

Settlement in Sisak-Moslavina County, Croatia

- Settlement
- Interactive map of Roždanik
- Location of Roždanik in Croatia
- Coordinates: 45°18′40″N 17°04′44″E
- Country: Croatia
- County: Sisak-Moslavina
- City: Novska

Area
  - Total: 8.1 km^{2} (3.1 sq mi)

Population (2021)
  - Total: 229
  - Density: 28/km^{2} (73/sq mi)
- Time zone: UTC+1 (CET)
  - Summer (DST): UTC+2 (CEST)
- Postal code: 44330 Novska
- Area code: +385 (0)44

Roždanik is a settlement in the City of Novska in Croatia. In 2021, its population was 229.

== Demographics ==
Roždanik: Population trends 1857–2021
v

population	223	210	246	321	391	419	413	408	406	404	422	385	371	330	291	262	229
	1857	1869	1880	1890	1900	1910	1921	1931	1948	1953	1961	1971	1981	1991	2001	2011	2021

Sources: Croatian Bureau of Statistics publications
