= 1991 killings of Serbs in Novska =

- Part of the Croatian War of Independence
- Location: Novska, Croatia
- Date: 21 November 1991 & 18 December 1991
- Target: Croatian Serbs
- Attack type: torture, mass murder
- Deaths: 7
- Perpetrator: Croatian forces

The 1991 killings of Serbs in Novska were two occurrences of mass murder of Croatian Serb civilians in the town of Novska, Croatia during the Croatian War of Independence.

== Background ==
In 1990, following the electoral defeat of the government of the Socialist Republic of Croatia by the Croatian Democratic Union (Croatian: Hrvatska demokratska zajednica, HDZ), ethnic tensions between Croats and Serbs worsened. The self-styled Republic of Serb Krajina (RSK) declared its intention to secede from Croatia and join the Republic of Serbia while the Government of the Republic of Croatia declared it a rebellion. In June 1991 Croatia declared independence from Yugoslavia. Tensions eventually broke out into full-scale war, which lasted until 1995.

Novska is a town situated in western Slavonia, between Kutina and Nova Gradiška. According to the 1991 census, the municipality of Novska registered 24,696 citizens of whom 21.7% were ethnic Serbs. By September 1991, the town was in the front lines of the war and the Croatian Army had been stationed there. By October, the 1991 Yugoslav campaign in Croatia had lost its momentum in western Slavonia.

== Crimes ==
In the late evening on 21 November 1991, Croatian forces broke into the house of Mihajlo Šeatović and took him to a neighboring house where three other Serb civilians were being detained: Mišo and Sajka Rašković and Ljuban Vujić. The four were then tortured and killed. The victims were stabbed with knives, their body parts mutilated, joints and bones crushed and they were then sprayed with bullets from automatic rifles. According to documentation compiled the following day, the bodies of Mihajlo Šeatović, Mišo Rašković and Ljuban Vujić were found in the living room in the lower part of the house with overturned chairs next to the tables. Sajka Rašković's body was found naked on the bed on the first floor with indications that she had been possibly raped.

On 18 December 1991, Croatian forces entered the house of Petar Mileusnić and shot him along with his wife Vera, daughter Goranka as well Blaženka Slabak. The three women died while Petar was wounded but managed to survive.

== Trials ==
=== Šeatović case ===
In 1992, an indictment was filed by the Croatian military prosecutor against two Croatian army soldiers, Dubravko Leskovar and Damir Vida Raguž, for the massacre in the Šeatović house. Though the charges were for murder and not for war crime against the civilian population. In November 1992, the Zagreb military court released them under an amnesty law which excused Croat perpetrators of crimes. In 2006, Marica Šeatović, the widow of the deceased Mihajlo who had only two years prior learned of the fate of her husband her neighbors, unsuccessfully sought compensation from a municipal court. The families of those killed contacted NGOs and international organizations which helped bring about a trial for the accused. On 16 April 2010, Raguž was found guilty of war crimes in a first-instance verdict and sentenced to 20 years in prison, while the other accused, Željko Škledar was acquitted. The verdict was overturned upon appeal and a re-trial ordered; both were acquitted in March 2013.

=== Mileusnić case ===
In 2010, proceedings were instituted against Željko Belina, Dejan Milić, Ivan Grgić and Zdravko Plesec, former members of the Croatian Army's First Guard Brigade nicknamed the ‘Tigers’ for the crime in the house of Petar Mileusnić. The suspects were soon released under the explanation of the Sisak County Court that this was an adjudicated matter. However, the Supreme Court overturned the decision on Belina and Milić, who in 2013 were sentenced by the Zagreb County Court to 10 and 9 years in prison, respectively.

== Sources ==
- Marijan, Davor (May 2012). "The Sarajevo Ceasefire – Realism or strategic error by the Croatian leadership?". Review of Croatian History. 7 (1). Croatian Institute of History: 103–123. ISSN 1845-4380.
