= Novi Grabovac =

Settlement in Sisak-Moslavina County, Croatia

- Settlement
- Interactive map of Novi Grabovac
- Location of Novi Grabovac in Croatia
- Coordinates: 45°24′07″N 16°59′42″E
- Country: Croatia
- County: Sisak-Moslavina
- City: Novska

Area
  - Total: 3.9 km^{2} (1.5 sq mi)

Population (2021)
  - Total: 5
  - Density: 1.3/km^{2} (3.3/sq mi)
- Time zone: UTC+1 (CET)
  - Summer (DST): UTC+2 (CEST)
- Postal code: 44330 Novska
- Area code: +385 (0)44

Novi Grabovac is a settlement in the City of Novska in Croatia. In 2021, its population was 5.

== Demographics ==
Novi Grabovac: Population trends 1857–2021
v

population	143	148	137	195	270	284	260	308	277	264	236	163	141	109	19	14	5
	1857	1869	1880	1890	1900	1910	1921	1931	1948	1953	1961	1971	1981	1991	2001	2011	2021

Sources: Croatian Bureau of Statistics publications
