= Novska =

- Town
- Grad Novska; Town of Novska
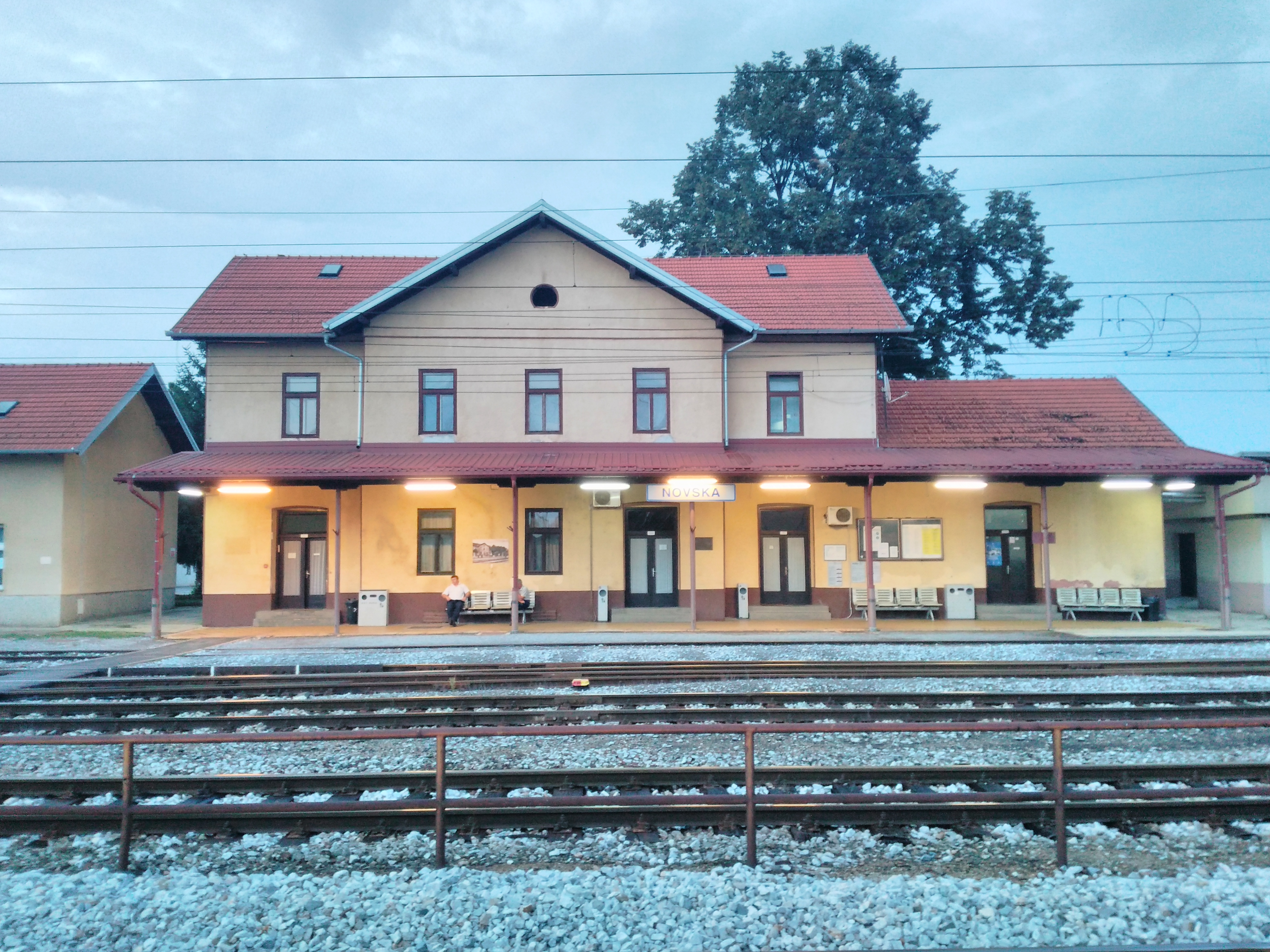
- Novska railway station
- Interactive map of Novska
- Location of Novska in Croatia
- Coordinates: 45°20′N 16°59′E
- Country: Croatia
- Region: Slavonia (Posavina)
- County: Sisak-Moslavina County

Government
  - Mayor: Marija Kušmiš (HDZ)

Area
  - Town: 319.8 km^{2} (123.5 sq mi)
  - Urban: 19.1 km^{2} (7.4 sq mi)

Population (2021)
  - Town: 11,137
  - Density: 34.82/km^{2} (90.20/sq mi)
  - Urban: 5,922
  - Urban density: 310/km^{2} (803/sq mi)
- Time zone: UTC+1 (Central European Time)
- Website: novska.hr

Novska is a town in the Sisak-Moslavina County of Croatia. It is located in western part of the historic region of Slavonia, between Kutina and Nova Gradiška, 94 km (58 mi) linear distance southeast of the capital, Zagreb.

== Climate ==
Since records began in 1981, the highest temperature recorded at the local weather station was 40.4 °C (104.7 °F), on 4 August 2017. The coldest temperature was −23.4 °C (−10.1 °F), on 13 January 2003.

== Demographics ==
Novska has a total population of 13,518 in the following settlements:

- Bair, population 6
- Borovac, population 273
- Brestača, population 913
- Brezovac, population 9
- Bročice, population 964
- Jazavica, population 398
- Kozarice, population 433
- Kričke, population 23
- Lovska, population 9
- Nova Subocka, population 713
- Novi Grabovac, population 14
- Novska, population 7,028
- Paklenica, population 279
- Plesmo, population 87
- Popovac, population 10
- Rađenovci, population 2
- Rajčići, population 4
- Rajić, population 875
- Roždanik, population 262
- Sigetac, population 122
- Stara Subocka, population 502
- Stari Grabovac
- Voćarica, population 199

In the 2011 census, 91.64% (12,388) of the population were Croats and 4.74% (641) were Serbs. In 1991 in the town lived 24,696 inhabitants, Croats 16,556 (67.03%), Serbs 5,402 (21.87%), Yugoslavs 675 (2.73%), others 2,063 (8.35%).

Town of Novska: Population trends 1857–2021
v

population	7213	8035	8322	10469	12002	13609	13419	14856	13713	14245	14743	15512	16686	17231	14313	13518	11137
	1857	1869	1880	1890	1900	1910	1921	1931	1948	1953	1961	1971	1981	1991	2001	2011	2021

Sources: Croatian Bureau of Statistics publications

== Politics ==
=== Minority councils and representatives ===
Directly elected minority councils and representatives are tasked with consulting tasks for the local or regional authorities in which they are advocating for minority rights and interests, integration into public life and participation in the management of local affairs. At the 2023 Croatian national minorities councils and representatives elections Serbs of Croatia fulfilled legal requirements to elect 15 members minority council of the Town of Novska.

== History ==
Before 1881, Novska was part of the Austrian monarchy (Kingdom of Croatia-Slavonia after the compromise of 1867), in the Slavonian Military Frontier, Gradiskaner Regiment N°VIII. Between 1881 and 1918, in the Požega County of the Kingdom.

During the Croatian War of Independence two separate mass murders of Serb civilians took place in the town. On 21 November 1991, four Serbs were tortured and killed. On 18 December 1991, four Serbs were shot with one managing to survive. In the first case, Croatian Army soldier Damir Vida Raguž was found guilty of war crimes in a first-instance verdict and sentenced to 20 years in prison, while the other accused, Željko Škledar was acquitted. The verdict was overturned however and following a re-trial, both were acquitted. In the second case, Željko Belina and Dejan Milić were sentenced by the Zagreb County Court to 10 and 9 years in prison, respectively, following a Supreme Court reversal of an earlier adjudication.

== Transport and industry ==
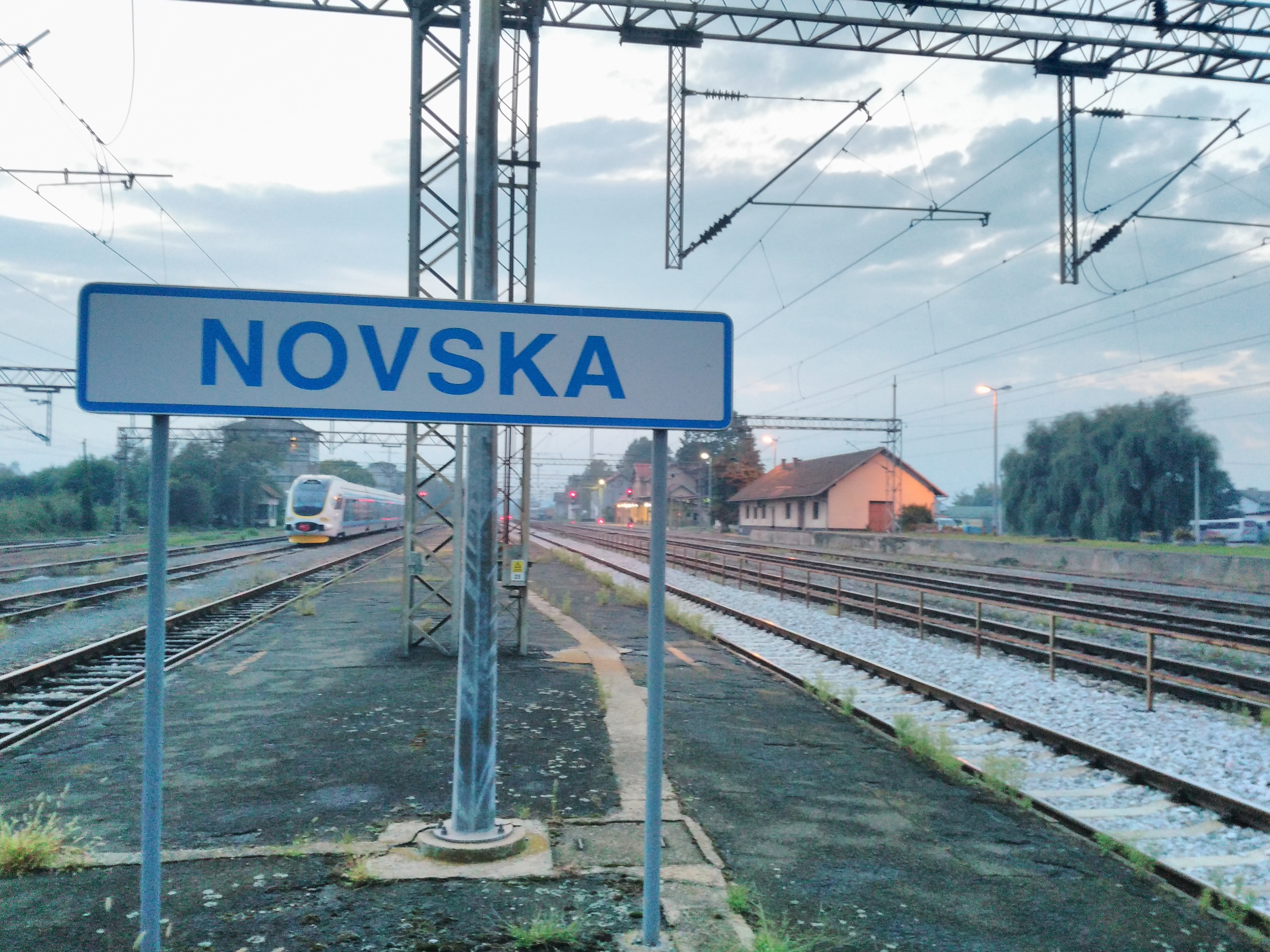

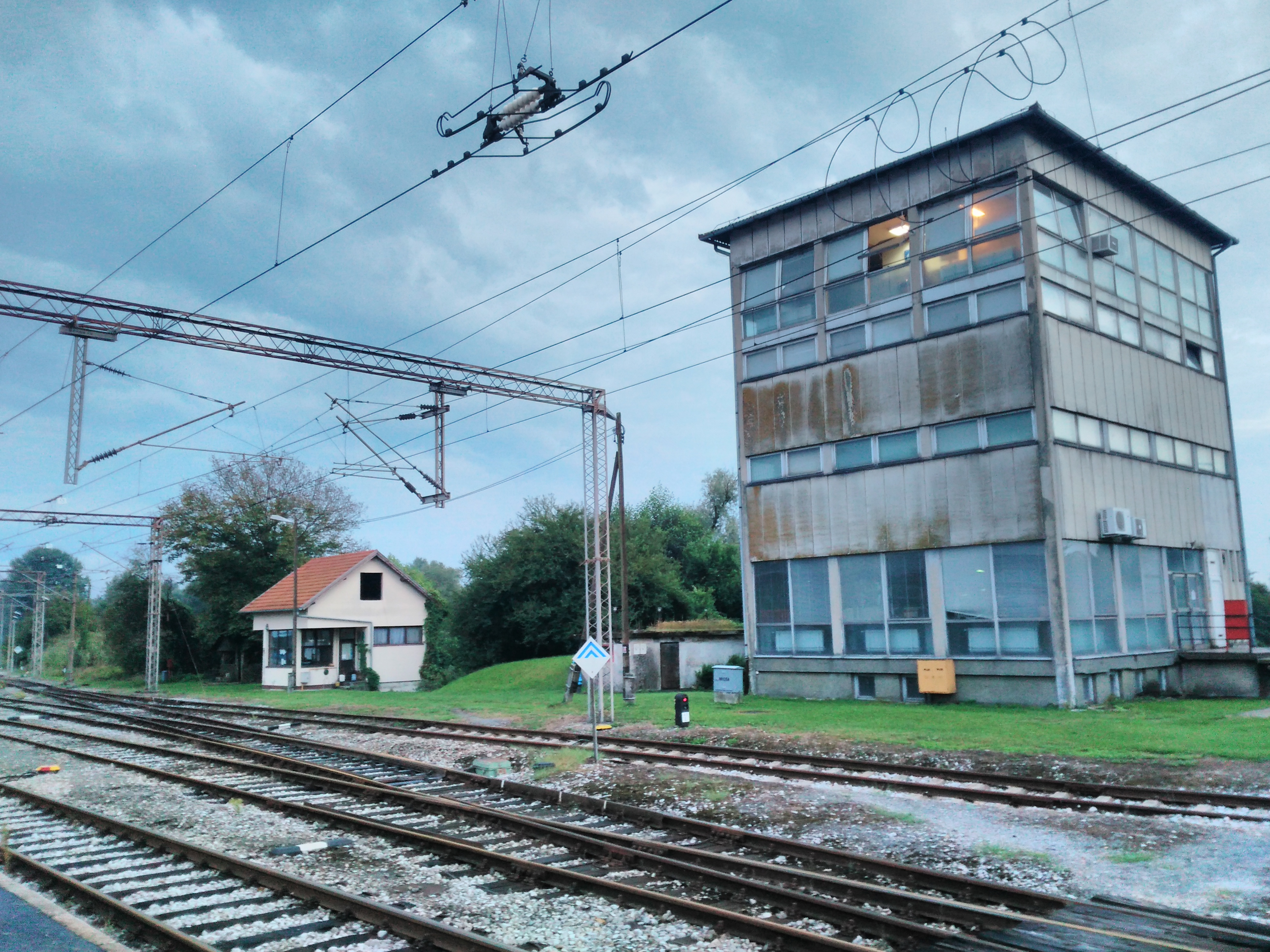

The Croatian railway lines M103, M104 and M105 are connected with each other at the Novska railway station. All of them and the A3 motorway, which runs passes by south of the town, are part of Pan-European Corridor X. Novska is known for its steel elbow factory, Metaflex.
