= Stari Grabovac =

Settlement in Sisak-Moslavina County, Croatia

- Settlement
- Interactive map of Stari Grabovac
- Location of Stari Grabovac in Croatia
- Coordinates: 45°19′23″N 17°00′14″E
- Country: Croatia
- County: Sisak-Moslavina
- City: Novska

Area
  - Total: 17.4 km^{2} (6.7 sq mi)

Population (2021)
  - Total: 311
  - Density: 17.9/km^{2} (46.3/sq mi)
- Time zone: UTC+1 (CET)
  - Summer (DST): UTC+2 (CEST)
- Postal code: 44330 Novska
- Area code: +385 (0)44

Stari Grabovac is a settlement in the City of Novska in Croatia. In 2021, its population was 311.

== Demographics ==
Stari Grabovac: Population trends 1857–2021
v

population	147	171	158	188	225	313	265	329	369	389	463	526	535	561	432	393	311
	1857	1869	1880	1890	1900	1910	1921	1931	1948	1953	1961	1971	1981	1991	2001	2011	2021

Sources: Croatian Bureau of Statistics publications
