= Rujevac, Croatia =

Coordinates: 45°07′49″N 16°15′57″E

Rujevac Рујевац (Serbian)
- Village
- Interactive map of Rujevac
- Country: Croatia
- Region: Continental Croatia (Banovina)
- County: Sisak-Moslavina
- Municipality: Dvor

Area
  - Total: 20.0 km^{2} (7.7 sq mi)
- Elevation: 198 m (650 ft)

Population (2021)
  - Total: 124
  - Density: 6.20/km^{2} (16.1/sq mi)
- Time zone: UTC+1 (CET)
  - Summer (DST): UTC+2 (CEST)
- Postal code: 44440 Dvor
- Area code: (+385) 44

Rujevac (Serbian Cyrillic: Рујевац) is a village in central Croatia, in the municipality of Dvor, Sisak-Moslavina County. It is connected by the D6 highway.

== Demographics ==
According to the 2011 census, the village of Rujevac has 254 inhabitants. This represents 43.35% of its pre-war population according to the 1991 census.

The 1991 census recorded that 92.32% of the village population were ethnic Serbs (541/586), 5.12% were Yugoslavs (30/586), 1.19% were ethnic Croats (7/586), while 1.37% were of other ethnic origin (8/586)

Historical population 1857-2011
v

population	471	868	902	992	1048	1125	963	1061	929	1033	925	725	699	586	224	254
	1857	1869	1880	1890	1900	1910	1921	1931	1948	1953	1961	1971	1981	1991	2001	2011

Sources: Croatian Bureau of Statistics publications

NOTE: Figures for years of 1869 and 1880 also include population of Trgovi

== Religion ==
=== Serbian Orthodox Church of the Transfiguration of the Lord ===
Serbian Orthodox Church of the Transfiguration of the Lord in Rujevac was completed in 1887 in historicist style. Church's iconostasis was completed in 1896 by Ivan Hochetlinger. Some of its icons were destroyed in 1941 when a Roman Catholic priest Osvald Tot who was involved with Ustashe government took them away under the claim that they need to be restored and adapted for Catholic services. Missing icons were painted by Dimitrije Joka in 1971 when the church was reconstructed.

== Sights and events ==
- Orthodox Church built in the late 19th century
- Celebration of the Feast of Transfiguration on 19 August
