= Volinja =

Volinja Волиња (Serbian)
- Village
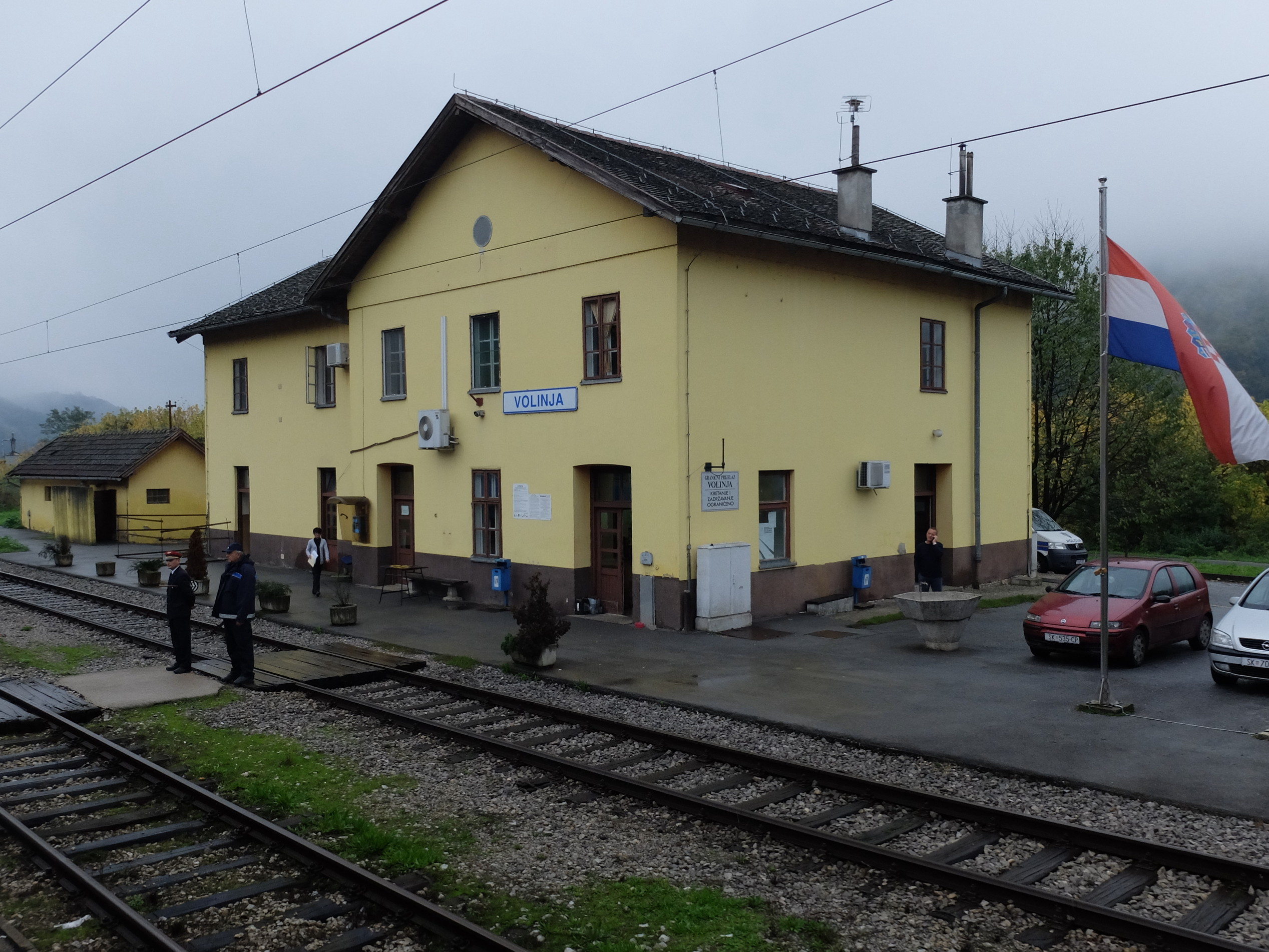
- Volinja train station

- Location of Volinja in Croatia
- Coordinates: 45°11′47″N 16°28′31″E
- Country: Croatia
- Region: Continental Croatia (Banovina)
- County: Sisak-Moslavina
- Municipality: Dvor

Area
  - Total: 18.6 km^{2} (7.2 sq mi)
- Elevation: 137 m (449 ft)

Population (2021)
  - Total: 43
  - Density: 2.3/km^{2} (6.0/sq mi)
- Time zone: UTC+1 (CET)
  - Summer (DST): UTC+2 (CEST)
- Postal code: 44435 Divuša
- Area code: (+385) 44

Volinja (Serbian Cyrillic: Волиња) is a village in central Croatia, in the municipality of Dvor, Sisak-Moslavina County.

== Demographics ==
According to the 2011 census, the village of Volinja has 77 inhabitants. This represents 33.77% of its pre-war population according to the 1991 census.

The 1991 census recorded that 91.67% of the village population were ethnic Serbs (209/228), 3.51% were ethnic Croats (8/228), 2.19% were Yugoslavs (5/228) and 2.63% were of other/unknown ethnic origin (6/228).

Historical population 1857-2011
v

population	110	124	138	229	274	404	292	351	265	286	286	272	252	228	81	77
	1857	1869	1880	1890	1900	1910	1921	1931	1948	1953	1961	1971	1981	1991	2001	2011

Sources: Croatian Bureau of Statistics publications
