= Brezovac, Sisak-Moslavina County =

Settlement in Sisak-Moslavina County, Croatia

Brezovac
- Settlement
- Interactive map of Brezovac
- Location of Brezovac in Croatia
- Coordinates: 45°23′06″N 17°03′54″E
- Country: Croatia
- County: Sisak-Moslavina
- City: Novska

Area
  - Total: 7.2 km^{2} (2.8 sq mi)

Population (2021)
  - Total: 2
  - Density: 0.28/km^{2} (0.72/sq mi)
- Time zone: UTC+1 (CET)
  - Summer (DST): UTC+2 (CEST)
- Postal code: 44330 Novska
- Area code: +385 (0)44

Brezovac is a settlement in the City of Novska in Croatia. In 2021, its population was 2.

== Demographics ==
Brezovac: Population trends 1857–2021
v

population				303					338	308	288	260	209	151	9	9	2
	1857	1869	1880	1890	1900	1910	1921	1931	1948	1953	1961	1971	1981	1991	2001	2011	2021

Sources: Croatian Bureau of Statistics publications
