= Gornji Žirovac =

Gornji Žirovac Горњи Жировац (Serbian)
- Village
- Interactive map of Gornji Žirovac
- Location of Gornji Žirovac in Croatia
- Coordinates: 45°07′15″N 16°08′03″E
- Country: Croatia
- Region: Continental Croatia (Banovina)
- County: Sisak-Moslavina
- Municipality: Dvor

Area
  - Total: 37.9 km^{2} (14.6 sq mi)

Population (2021)
  - Total: 14
  - Density: 0.37/km^{2} (0.96/sq mi)
- Time zone: UTC+1 (CET)
  - Summer (DST): UTC+2 (CEST)
- Area code: 044
- Vehicle registration: SK

Gornji Žirovac (or Upper Žirovac; Serbian Cyrillic: Горњи Жировац) is a settlement in Croatia located on the hilly region of Banija, at the foot of the hill Kokirna, along the border with Bosnia and Herzegovina. It is known among the inhabitants of Banija as suva međa meaning dry border. It consists of several hamlets on top of smaller hills which generally follow the creek Žirovac (with several of its occasional or permanent streams) and creek Radašnica. Hamlets usually receive a name according to the names of people who once lived there. So there are place names Carići, Drljače, Ljiljci, Poznanovići, Glušci, Španovići, Krnjajići, Čuglji, Ćorkovići, Suzići. Other toponims (oronyms, hydronyms) are of standard origin, so there are Hrastovača, Ribnik, Dabruša, etc. The houses are almost always located on the hills, partly because of the danger of flooding and partly for reasons of defense, since settlement was at (different) state borders throughout recent centuries.

== History ==
The fate of the Gornji Žirovac is associated with a turbulent and violent past of the rest of Banija whose population for centuries gave birth, fought and died in the constant worry and conflict with the rulers who were claiming these areas, countries that were formed and disappeared, looting and devastation of various military units, bandits, disease, poor fruitful years, dying in foreign lands for various foreign rulers and to top it all, hard work in the countryside, and most of its existence being defined by Military Frontier.

=== The earliest history ===
Area around Gornji Žirovac was vibrant since the times of the Vučedol culture, the Illyrians and later the Romans, which is certainly due to the proximity of the mine Gvozdansko that existed from the earliest days and the fact that the communication of the time was mostly along river valleys (like Žirovac and Radašnica). However serious research has never been done around Gornji Žirovac itself. There are some remains of ruins, but it is not certain what period or epoch they were built. Although the Hoards were found in some of the surrounding areas, in Gornji Žirovac none was reported.

=== Time before Military Frontier ===
Before the time of the Military Frontier, control of the whole area belonged to the landlords who bought, sold and replaced possessions until the appearance of the Ottoman Turks. With the arrival of the Turks and in a series of their arrivals and departures, only a handful of soldiers were left in keep Zrin and Gvozdansko, set by Zrinski family (last landlord family). They were often left unpaid and in poor conditions, further complicating defence. Thus Pounje (area around river Una) eventually became abandoned. We can expect that a similar fate happened to Žirovac but there are no records. Finally, the entire area came under Turkish rule and was under it for about 160 years.

=== Military Frontier ===
During the period of Military Frontier, mass migrations of the population went on all the time in both directions and in several waves. First fleeing away from Turks, then those who collaborated with the Turks were fleeing after their fall, and in the second direction people fleeing from the vengeance of those arriving. Most were from Potkozarsko area and from the Sana'a basin.

In order to keep the residents, the Austro-Hungarian government awarded all to be free, with no obligation to any landlord, but under conditions that were not much easier: they were obligated to be prepared for military campaigns at any time, to work to restore roads and maintain Fortifications. Often these commitments were too hard and sparked occasional rebellions.

Gornji Žirovac was just at the "dry border", and during this time, its frontiersmen had built a series of roads and "straža" (guard stations), which were part of the Austro-Hungarian defensive line, known as "cordon". From a series of guard stations along the border, in the vicinity of Gornji Žirovac there were seven of them. In later years frequency of stations was reduced and only two or three remained, with one newly built – CP Radašnica, which was marked as "Kastell", that is – of something greater importance. The existence of a larger fortress was not recorded, mostly because the later peace treaties with the Turks forbid new fortifications of any larger scale in this area.

The place has seen a lot of military activity, some of which was described in military reports of Austro-Hungarian military. One such description from 1789 tells about a group of 31 men surrounded in one Chardak by the Turks. When surrender was refused, the Turks tried to burn Chardak with a wagon filled with straw, pushed by eight men. Chardak snipers however managed to shoot down all eight of them. Turks then tried to let wagon roll downhill, but the burning wagon got stuck in bushes and they gave up, but did took time to burn and pillage village. It is unclear which of CP was in question, but the story is that it was not "the first hill" but, "in a valley (..) was a wooden chardak, neither disguised nor entrenched".

Later, as the danger of war diminished, cordon remained more as a sanitary boundary.

=== Until the First World War ===
Economy

After the abolition of the Military Frontier, slow development of the region begins and the first civilian institutions are formed. Rural cooperatives open up and one of them in Gornji Žirovac. This is also the time of the fall of grain prices due to imports to Europe from USA, so times were getting harder for the population working in the primary economies. At the time, heavy emigration to America begins, but most of people left with the plans to return, as they were leaving their wives at home. From Banija villages, Žirovac was one of the strongest centers of emigration, which occurred in three waves during the period from 1901 to 1914 and the most at period of 1905–1906. Already in 1908 many of them returned, but due to poor agriculture year 1909, some of them went away back in 1910. The total of 1390 people from Žirovac (Upper and Lower) have gone to America.

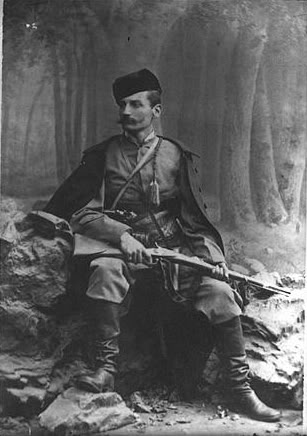
Peter in guerilla uniform, c. 1875

Episode with Karadjordjevic

In a little-known episode, Peter Karadjordjevic who repeatedly stayed in Banija under the name of Peter Mrkonjić, arrived in Žirovac in 1876 during the insurrection in Bosnia. His men rallied along the "dry border" and reached the former CP Ćorkovača (which still existed at the time, according to the map of the third military survey), set camp and from there conducted incursions towards Bužim with his (as he said) two hundred people.

=== The First World War ===
The First World War is another war that could not avoid people of Žirovac. Again they were soldiers, sent to fight for the Austro-Hungarian Empire again, for the most part on the eastern front (with Russia). However, no battle was fought in the area thus luckily, this was the first war that did not cause destruction of village. After war end, another state was formed. This time it's Kingdom of Yugoslavia.

=== The Kingdom of Yugoslavia ===
Early after the war, the primary school in Gornji Žirovac was finished (school in Donji Žirovac was built before, in 1899), and overall literacy greatly improves. Some children were sent to towns to be apprentice in trades, however although some did develop skills (like blacksmith Pavao Ljiljak), it was mostly practiced just a side business and aside from the one village shop, farming remained the main occupation.

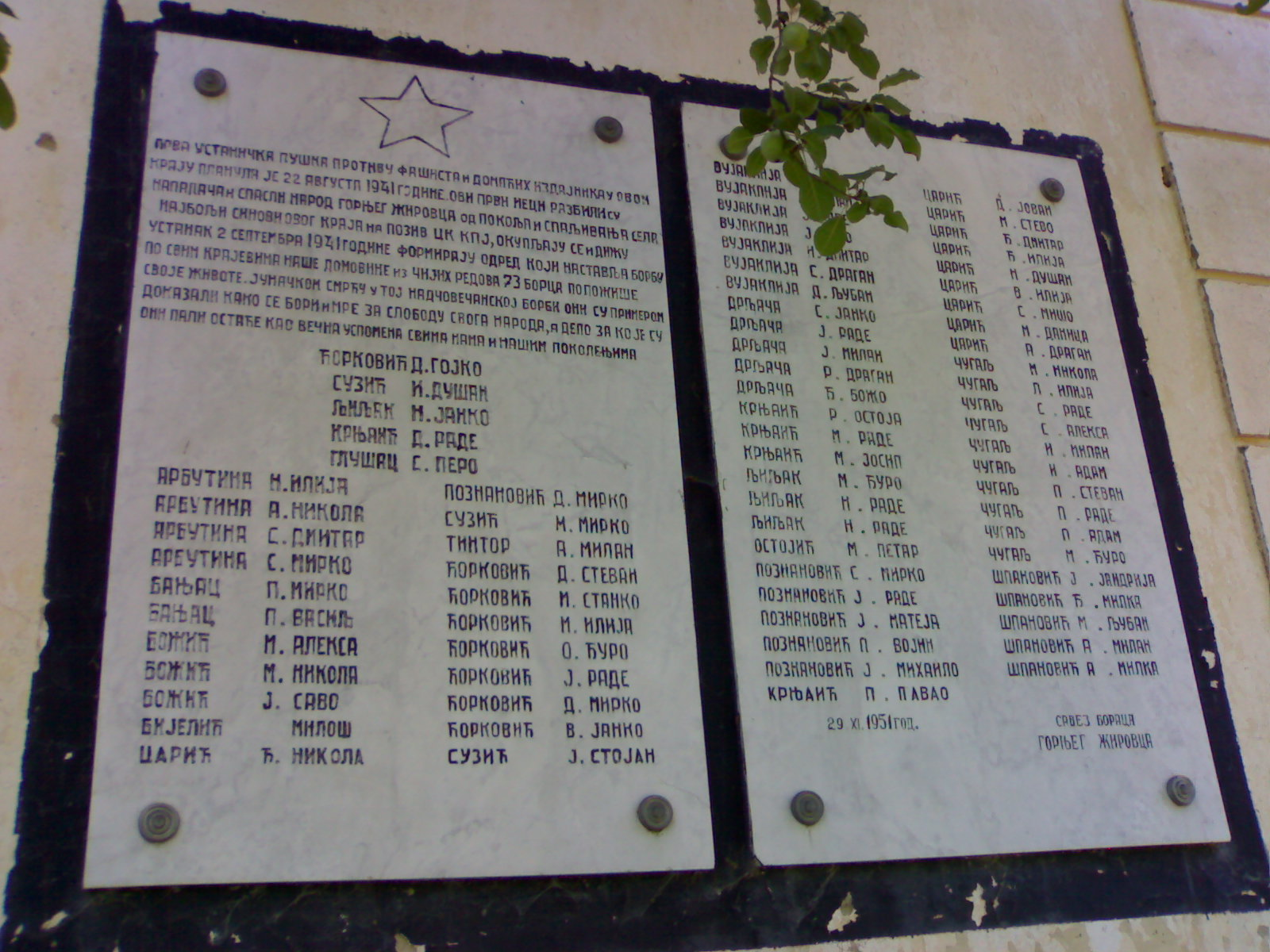
Memorial plaque with names of partisans from Gornji Žirovac, killed or missing in action during World War II.

=== World War II ===
During World War II, the whole place had suffered terrible casualties. After Germany occupied the Kingdom of Yugoslavia in 1941, they helped Croats to proclaim the Independent State of Croatia (NDH). Since the entire area at the time was populated not with Croats, but in majority with Serbian population, it was inevitable soon to expect that war crimes Ustaše did throughout Banija, starting from Glina massacres come to Žirovac also. Thus, during 1942, a group of five hundred Ustaša breached to Žirovac and allocated 70 people and killed 25 on the spot, while the rest of those were taken to concentration camps.

All these events could not go away without response, so the people of Žirovac soon rebel and 22 August 1941 first unrest started. Organized uprising in Gornji Žirovac begins officially on 2 September 1941, when the communist party (KPJ) gathers people and organizes the first partisan squad. Squad eventually becomes part of the famous 7th Banija Brigade "Vasilj Gaćeša" and there was almost no resident of Žirovac who did not have had some of their own kin in partisans. Brigade found itself in some of the most important and violent battles of the war such as the Battle of Sutjeska which is why many of fighters did not survive the war. In fact, as many as seventy partisans died from Gornji Žirovac alone. In memory of them, a memorial plaque with names was erected at the primary school.

=== Yugoslavia ===
After the end of war and the emergence of second Yugoslavia, or SFRJ as the official name was, people felt that finally, after all these centuries of suffering, wars and foreign rule, peace has finally arrive and sincerely perceived Yugoslavia as their own homeland which freedom they won. Standard of living improved and the population, though still poor and exhausted by wars, was for the first time no longer on the verge of starvation. People educated children for a variety of occupations and some of them finished universities. Many found work in the surrounding towns such as Glina, Dvor, Petrinja or Bosanski Novi where industry boomed as a result of planned economy. Soon, with better standards and then secure jobs in the nearby industrial centers, new migration occurred – this time towards nearby towns.

At the same time, people never forgot their origins and organize Donations and worked hard by themself to set up water supply to some parts of the village. At the end of the twentieth century, partly thanks to their voluntary work and money, the road to Donji Žirovac was paved in asphalt.

=== The events of 1990–1995 ===
Events in Croatia in 1990 and 1991 did not bypass Gornji Žirovac. Village became part of the newly formed state of Republic of Serbian Krajina and circumstantial, again at the border as century ago.

In August 1995 Croatian Army begins Operation Storm. Soon, people from entire region were trying to escape and out of only a few possible routes, one led through Donji Žirovac towards Bosanski Novi. Two streams of people were joining in Donji Žirovac as two roads cross there: one stream from the direction of Glina via main road and the other stream of people from the entire region of Kordun using narrow forest roads via Obljaj. Series of military attack of Croatian Army on the streams of Refugees at Donji Žirovac to this day remains only as a list of testimonies and no one has been charged.

=== After 1995 ===
Gornji Žirovac in 1995 became part of the present day Republic of Croatia and people left.

== Demographics ==
According to census 2001. there were 19 people in Gornji Žirovac.

Historical population of Gornji Žirovac
Year	Pop.	±%
1857	2,053	—
1869	2,122	+3.4%
1880	2,106	−0.8%
1890	1,268	−39.8%
1900	1,361	+7.3%
1910	1,432	+5.2%
1921	1,158	−19.1%
1931	1,269	+9.6%
1948	1,077	−15.1%
1953	1,045	−3.0%
1961	880	−15.8%
1971	675	−23.3%
1981	558	−17.3%
1991	367	−34.2%
2001	19	−94.8%
2011	19	+0.0%
Source: Naselja i stanovništvo Republike Hrvatske 1857–2001, DZS, Zagreb, 2005 & Popis stanovništva 2011

== Buildings ==
Today's Gornji Žirovac is sparsely populated and remains of houses abandoned after 1995 are visible everywhere. But Gornji Žirovac had more buildings during its existence, yet today they are hardly noticeable.

=== Church ===
In the northern part of the village, near the place where the Radašnica flows into Žirovac, there is a bridge still called The Church Bridge. The church is long gone, but once it was about a hundred meters north of the bridge at the crossroads. There was a small plain and foundations may still be noticeable. The tale is that the church was wooden, and according to some accounts, it allegedly burned down (although this oral tradition varies from source to source) and later built again, but in another place which turned out to be uphill, in the center of village Donji Žirovac. The church was called the Church of St. Petrus and on the Austro-Hungarian military map from 1753.g. is marked this way.

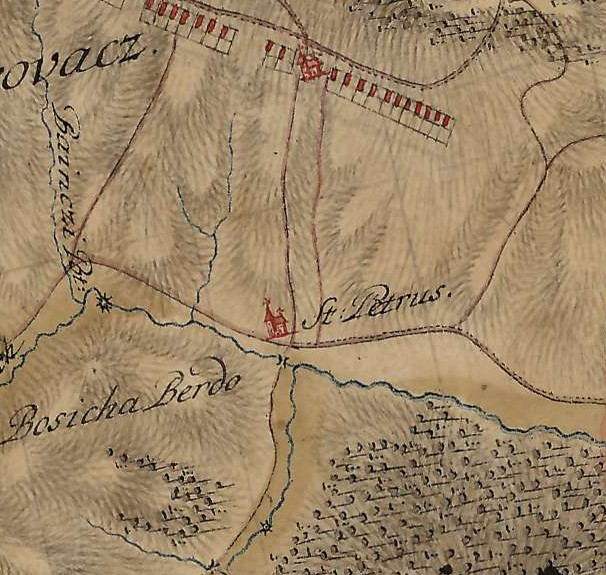
Old church in Gornji Žirovac

Location was probably 45.1423°N 16.1462°E.

On the Austro-Hungarian map there is another church to the north, at the site of the present day church of St. Petrus in the Donji Žirovac. That church was not named on map, so one can only assume that the tale is correct, and that the other church was there the same time, possibly still being built, or Donji Žirovac had older church at the same spot. However, according to tradition, the location near the bridge was also not the first church location. The story is that although the exact primary location is not known, it must have been somewhere at the Kokirna hill. Since there are several locations where traces of earlier buildings exists, this may be true, but since everything is under-explored the story remains only in the oral tradition until serious ground work.

=== City ===
Gornji Žirovac at one point in its history (end of 18th and most of 19th century), had "the City". It was some sort of military camp serving as a customs post. The location is well known and it is on Carića hill, south of the cemetery, at the crossroads of the then road to Donji Žirovac to the north, to the south to Bužim and to the hamlets along the creek Žirovac to the east to Radašnica westward. It is not certain that this road (which went on top of the hill and to the city) was the main, but the location of camp certainly was such that they were able to control both road in the valleys along streams Žirovac and Radašnica.

On the Austro-Hungarian military maps, city is quite precisely drawn:

- On "first" measurement in 1763, the city was not there, but the north of the City is designated as Stražbenica (guard hill), which could mean that once way before someone stood guard before the construction of the City and the other guard.
- From the second survey, in 1806, the city is only labeled Cordons Posten (like any other Guard post at the time), but with no name. Even then it is away from the other guard posts on the map of which at that time, only every third or fourth remained.
- On the third survey there is the name "Radašnica" and additional text that is difficult to read, but that should be Kastell, which would be logical (castle, fortress). However, hand-written text "font" of the time resembles word Rastell, and later historical literature mentions such places as "raštel", which is explained as raštel = "a place of trade".
- On the cadastre of 1861, the city was perfectly well marked, and the location is visible on today's cadastre and marked in cadastre books under the name "city".

Internal dimensions were 50x50m and in the middle there was an unknown object with dimensions 15x15m. City did have its water well (that never dried up, as word of mouth is), so it is possible that this was a well or perhaps some dwellings for soldiers (watchtower).

At present day, only a puddle remains where was well was, and some embankments. Trenches around the barracks are still in the woods and around the "city".

=== Cordons Posten ===
The word Cordons Posten is of French origin and means a kind of guard post that exists at key points, at a distance from each other at most a few tens of minutes in which frontiersmen are on guard. It was built on the Military Frontier "dry" border in the 18th century by frontiersmen. Their positions are roughly known today thanks to the maps drown by Austria-Hungary Empire. In fact, cordon line is even today state border. Already in mid 19th century, their number is reduced to about one in four and later with the dissolution of the Military Border, posts were abandoned. Sketch of one (Cardak in Žirovac) exists today in a war museum in Vienna. One of them (CP Ćorkovača), also played another role later in history when Petar Karadjordjevic happened to arrive there in 1876.

All together, there were seven posts in the vicinity of Gornji Žirovac and it is not known if anything is left there, but it's highly unlikely since all posts around Žirovac have probably all been made of wood.

=== Ruin ===
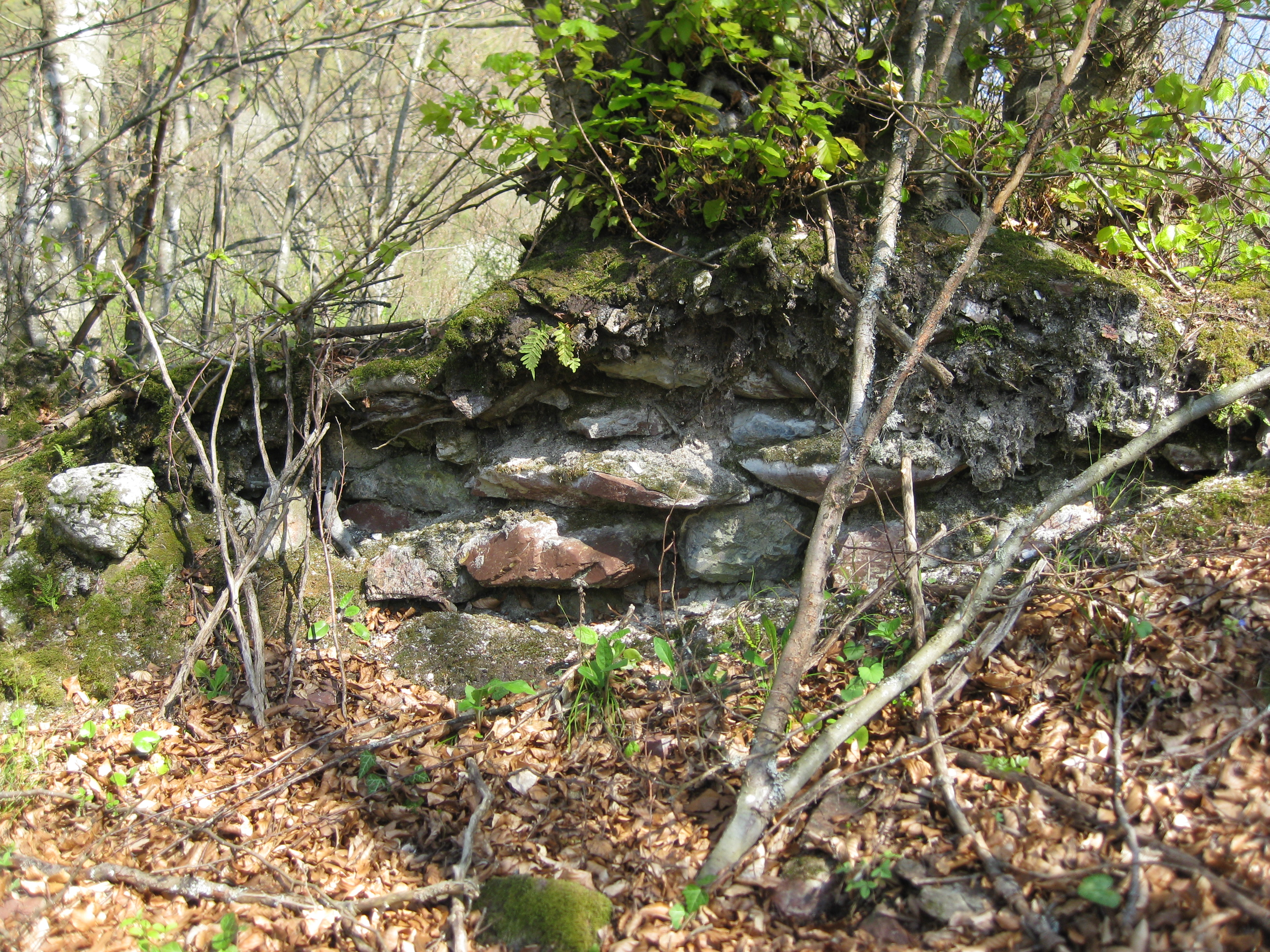
Gradac (ruin)

At the Gornji Žirovac area there are a lot of remnants of the former stone structures, but none of them is officially recognized as a tower house or a castle. One stone structure is at the place called "Gradac", near the top of the hill Kokirna. It appears to be made of stones of various sizes and shapes, in an apparent horizontal row arrangement. It is not a dry stone, as remnants of some binder can be seen. The structure is in poor condition and not much is left of it.

== Other locations ==
=== Cemeteries ===
Around Gornji Žirovac there were three identified cemeteries, but it is possible there may be more. They are:

- Poznanovići
- next to crossroad to the school, on the western side of the road
- on Carić hills

According to some oral tales, soldiers that were once at "the city" died and were buried near the "city".

=== Mills ===
There were many mills throughout the area. In 1763 there were fifteen mills in Gornji Žirovac at least. Locations are known, since they were marked well on map, but they disappeared by the mid-twentieth century, and hardly any traces are seen today.

=== Rural Cooperative ===
At the end of 19.th century, rural Cooperatives started to form in Banija and a small shop and administrative building was erected. The building still exists today, but it is in disrepair.

=== School ===
School in Donji Žirovac was in existence since 1899 (there is a record of a bill of around 5,000 forints for its construction) where people from Gornji Žirovac went to school at first. Later, a new construction of school and teachers' flat was planned in 1914, with the cost estimated 25,000 K, but by the beginning of First World War, only construction was completed. The school was built later and it was in function until the end of the twentieth century.

== Transport connections ==
Nowadays, Gornji Žirovac is connected with local road to the north with Donji Žirovac to what is today D6 road (Dvor-Glina-Vrginmost-Vojnić-E71).

Streams Žirovac and Radašnica are not navigable today, and the railroad never passed near (not even narrow-gauge railway), so the road transport was and still is the main form of transportation.

For the period of Roman and pre-Roman times there is no data for Žirovac, but we know that Banija area was active. At those times, people and goods were moving along river valleys, so one can only assume that Radašnica and Žirovac saw some traffic. Later, the main transport route is the road Novi Grad – Glina through Donji Žirovac. That it is well marked on the map of 1763. At the end of the 19th century, road maps of Austro-Hungarian Empire show that now there is even an official trade road through Gornji Žirovac from south (from Bužim, BiH), to the north to Donji Žirovac (at the time, possibly monitored from CP Radašnica) and connecting to the road Novi Grad – Glina. By the early 20th century this road ceased to be important and today it is no longer possible to cross state border with BiH, and all that is left is almost non-passable forest road.

== Natural resources ==
Although close to Gvozdansko and Majdan which since ancient times was a mining community as their names imply, around Gornji Žirovac area there are no known traces of mineral exploitations. Last attempts to catalogue minerals were at the mid 20th century and although minerals were found, no commercial exploitation was done.

Gornji Žirovac is however rich in forest and in sources of spring water. Almost every hill has its spring. The result is a network of streams that flow into Radašnica, Žirovac and ultimately make part of the drainage basin of the Una River.

== Word of mouth ==
According to the story of Stevan Carić, there was a military unit in the camp, and in 19th century, unit was poisoned. We do not know when, but someone threw poison into the water. If the proximity of former camp location, one could still find the remains of bones. The landfill has been dug a lot of years later and used to build barns and as Stevan saw while digging the country, he believes that this could also be a mass grave.

North of it and close to the location of a former garrison, there is a cemetery, but soldiers were not buried there.

== See also ==
- Banovina (region)
- Dvor, Croatia
