= Kosna, Croatia =

Settlement in Sisak-Moslavina County, Croatia

Kosna
- Settlement
- Interactive map of Kosna
- Location of Kosna in Croatia
- Coordinates: 45°05′42″N 16°16′18″E
- Country: Croatia
- County: Sisak-Moslavina
- Municipality: Dvor

Area
  - Total: 13.0 km^{2} (5.0 sq mi)

Population (2021)
  - Total: 16
  - Density: 1.2/km^{2} (3.2/sq mi)
- Time zone: UTC+1 (CET)
  - Summer (DST): UTC+2 (CEST)
- Postal code: 44440 Dvor
- Area code: +385 (0)44

Kosna is a settlement in the Municipality of Dvor in Croatia. In 2021, its population was 16.

== Demographics ==
Kosna: Population trends 1857–2021
v

population	360	356	363	454	441	530	438	363	323	330	285	228	161	108	36	35	16
	1857	1869	1880	1890	1900	1910	1921	1931	1948	1953	1961	1971	1981	1991	2001	2011	2021

Sources: Croatian Bureau of Statistics publications
