= Rađenovci =

Settlement in Sisak-Moslavina County, Croatia

- Settlement
- Interactive map of Rađenovci
- Location of Rađenovci in Croatia
- Coordinates: 45°20′46″N 17°10′12″E
- Country: Croatia
- County: Sisak-Moslavina
- City: Novska

Area
  - Total: 1.9 km^{2} (0.73 sq mi)

Population (2021)
  - Total: 2
  - Density: 1.1/km^{2} (2.7/sq mi)
- Time zone: UTC+1 (CET)
  - Summer (DST): UTC+2 (CEST)
- Postal code: 44330 Novska
- Area code: +385 (0)44

Rađenovci is a settlement in the City of Novska in Croatia. In 2021, its population was 2.

== Demographics ==
Rađenovci: Population trends 1857–2021
v

| population | | | | 227 | 243 | 308 | 247 | | 107 | 137 | 146 | 97 | 58 | 24 | 2 | 2 | 2 |
| | 1857 | 1869 | 1880 | 1890 | 1900 | 1910 | 1921 | 1931 | 1948 | 1953 | 1961 | 1971 | 1981 | 1991 | 2001 | 2011 | 2021 |

Sources: Croatian Bureau of Statistics publications
