= Šegestin =

Šegestin Шегестин (Serbian)
- Village
- Location of Šegestin in Croatia
- Coordinates: 45°09′16″N 16°23′22″E
- Country: Croatia
- Region: Continental Croatia (Banovina)
- County: Sisak-Moslavina
- Municipality: Dvor

Area
  - Total: 4.5 km^{2} (1.7 sq mi)
- Elevation: 268 m (879 ft)

Population (2021)
  - Total: 7
  - Density: 1.6/km^{2} (4.0/sq mi)
- Time zone: UTC+1 (CET)
  - Summer (DST): UTC+2 (CEST)
- Postal code: 44435 Divuša
- Area code: (+385) 44

Šegestin (Serbian Cyrillic: Шегестин) is a village in central Croatia, in the municipality of Dvor, Sisak-Moslavina County. It is connected by the D6 highway.

== Demographics ==
According to the 2011 census, the village of Šegestin has 35 inhabitants. This represents 26.12% of its pre-war population according to the 1991 census.

The 1991 census recorded that 99.25% of the village population were ethnic Serbs (133/134) while 0.75% were ethnic Croats (1/134).

Historical population 1857-2011
v

population	270	286	307	382	441	423	381	386	293	317	318	248	187	134	65	35
	1857	1869	1880	1890	1900	1910	1921	1931	1948	1953	1961	1971	1981	1991	2001	2011

Sources: Croatian Bureau of Statistics publications

== Sights ==
The Church of the Holy Prophet, dedicated to honour the holy Mother of God, was built in 1825. In 1942, during the World War II, the church was destroyed by Ustasha. The church was not rebuilt after the war and, for a long time, it stood with bare walls, without roof and towers. The church does not exist anymore in the village and even its foundations are hard to notice as the location is abandoned and not adapted for visitors.
