= Sigetac =

Settlement in Sisak-Moslavina County, Croatia

- Settlement
- Interactive map of Sigetac
- Location of Sigetac in Croatia
- Coordinates: 45°20′56″N 16°52′16″E
- Country: Croatia
- County: Sisak-Moslavina
- City: Novska

Area
  - Total: 14.3 km^{2} (5.5 sq mi)

Population (2021)
  - Total: 92
  - Density: 6.4/km^{2} (17/sq mi)
- Time zone: UTC+1 (CET)
  - Summer (DST): UTC+2 (CEST)
- Postal code: 44330 Novska
- Area code: +385 (0)44

Sigetac is a settlement in the City of Novska in Croatia. In 2021, its population was 92.

== Demographics ==
Sigetac Novski: Population trends 1921–2021
v

population		247	267	288	260	217	191	170	161	122	92
	1921	1931	1948	1953	1961	1971	1981	1991	2001	2011	2021

Note:Until 1991, it was recorded under the name Sigetac Novski. It has been recorded as a settlement since 1931; that year under the name Sigeci Novski. Sources: Croatian Bureau of Statistics publications
