= Udetin =

Coordinates: 45°08′N 16°19′E

Udetin Удетин (Serbian)
- Interactive map of Udetin
- Country: Croatia
- Region: Continental Croatia (Banovina)
- County: Sisak-Moslavina
- Municipality: Dvor

Area
  - Total: 4.6 km^{2} (1.8 sq mi)

Population (2021)
  - Total: 28
  - Density: 6.1/km^{2} (16/sq mi)
- Time zone: UTC+1 (CET)
  - Summer (DST): UTC+2 (CEST)

Udetin (Serbian Cyrillic: Удетин) is a settlement in the Dvor municipality in central Croatia.
