= Javornik, Croatia =

Javornik
- Location within Croatia
- Coordinates: 45.019549°N 16.34903°E
- Country: Croatia
- County: Sisak-Moslavina
- Municipality: Dvor

Area
  - Total: 21.6 km^{2} (8.3 sq mi)

Population (2021)
  - Total: 71
  - Density: 3.3/km^{2} (8.5/sq mi)
- Time zone: UTC+1 (CET)
  - Summer (DST): UTC+2 (CEST)

Javornik (Serbian Cyrillic: Јаворник) is a village on the Una River, near the town Dvor, Banija region, Croatia. It is part of the Dvor municipality and its population was 107 at the 2011 census.
