= Veliki Strug =

Coordinates: 45°09′46″N 17°08′45″E

Basin features
- Tributaries
  - left: Subocka

Veliki Strug is a river in Croatia, monitored by the government as it is longer than 20 km (12 mi). It is a left tributary of Sava, located in the Lonjsko Polje area.

A reinforced concrete bridge across the Veliki Strug built near Bročice in 1915-1916 was the most important such bridge in Croatia before World War I.
