= Oraovica (at Grdelica) =

Oraovica Ораовица
- Village
- Location within Serbia
- Coordinates: 42°52′40″N 22°04′11″E
- Country: Serbia
- District: Jablanica District
- Municipality: Leskovac

Population (2002)
  - Total: 2,210
- Time zone: UTC+1 (CET)
  - Summer (DST): UTC+2 (CEST)

Oraovica (Serbian Cyrillic: Ораовица) is a village in the municipality of Leskovac, Serbia. According to the 2002 census, the village has a population of 2210 people.
