= Zut, Sisak-Moslavina County =

Settlement in Sisak-Moslavina County, Croatia

Zut
- Settlement
- Interactive map of Zut
- Location of Zut in Croatia
- Coordinates: 45°01′40″N 16°17′06″E
- Country: Croatia
- County: Sisak-Moslavina
- Municipality: Dvor

Area
  - Total: 7.0 km^{2} (2.7 sq mi)

Population (2021)
  - Total: 0
  - Density: 0.0/km^{2} (0.0/sq mi)
- Time zone: UTC+1 (CET)
  - Summer (DST): UTC+2 (CEST)
- Postal code: 44440 Dvor
- Area code: +385 (0)44

Zut is a settlement in the Municipality of Dvor in Croatia. In 2021, its population was 0.

== Demographics ==
Zut: Population trends 1857–2021
v

population	330	370	396	485	554	618	616	600	390	413	367	285	191	145	10	1
	1857	1869	1880	1890	1900	1910	1921	1931	1948	1953	1961	1971	1981	1991	2001	2011	2021

Sources: Croatian Bureau of Statistics publications
