= Oraovica (at Crkovnica) =

Oraovica Ораовица
- Village
- Location within Serbia
- Coordinates: 43°06′02″N 22°00′57″E
- Country: Serbia
- District: Jablanica District
- Municipality: Leskovac

Population (2002)
  - Total: 152
- Time zone: UTC+1 (CET)
  - Summer (DST): UTC+2 (CEST)

Oraovica (Serbian Cyrillic: Ораовица) is a village in the municipality of Leskovac, Serbia. According to the 2002 census, the village has a population of 152 people.
