= Rajčići, Croatia =

Settlement in Sisak-Moslavina County, Croatia

Rajčići
- Settlement
- Interactive map of Rajčići
- Location of Rajčići in Croatia
- Coordinates: 45°20′10″N 17°08′17″E
- Country: Croatia
- County: Sisak-Moslavina
- City: Novska

Area
  - Total: 21.4 km^{2} (8.3 sq mi)

Population (2021)
  - Total: 2
  - Density: 0.093/km^{2} (0.24/sq mi)
- Time zone: UTC+1 (CET)
  - Summer (DST): UTC+2 (CEST)
- Postal code: 44330 Novska
- Area code: +385 (0)44

Rajčići is a settlement in the City of Novska in Croatia. In 2021, its population was 2.

== Demographics ==
Rajčići: Population trends 1857–2021
v

population	480	594	647	526	554	621	580	876	230	269	294	226	148	87	10	4	2
	1857	1869	1880	1890	1900	1910	1921	1931	1948	1953	1961	1971	1981	1991	2001	2011	2021

Sources: Croatian Bureau of Statistics publications
