= Donja Paklenica =

Donja Paklenica Доња Пакленица
- Village
- Location within Bosnia and Herzegovina
- Country: Bosnia and Herzegovina
- Entity: Republika Srpska
- Region: Doboj
- Municipality: Doboj
- Time zone: UTC+1 (CET)
  - Summer (DST): UTC+2 (CEST)

Donja Paklenica (Serbian: Доња Пакленица) is a village in the municipality of Doboj, Republika Srpska, Bosnia and Herzegovina.
