= Unčani =

Coordinates: 45°08′N 16°25′E

Unčani Унчани (Serbian)
- Village
- Interactive map of Unčani
- Country: Croatia
- Region: Continental Croatia (Banovina)
- County: Sisak-Moslavina
- Municipality: Dvor

Area
  - Total: 2.1 sq mi (5.5 km^{2})

Population (2021)
  - Total: 135
  - Density: 64/sq mi (25/km^{2})
- Time zone: UTC+1 (CET)
  - Summer (DST): UTC+2 (CEST)

Unčani (Serbian Cyrillic: Унчани) is a village in Croatia. It is connected by the D47 highway.
