= Donja Oraovica =

Donja Oraovica Доња Ораовица (Serbian)
- Village
- Location of Donja Oraovica in Croatia
- Coordinates: 45°08′54″N 16°25′48″E
- Country: Croatia
- Region: Continental Croatia (Banovina)
- County: Sisak-Moslavina
- Municipality: Dvor

Area
  - Total: 3.0 km^{2} (1.2 sq mi)
- Elevation: 151 m (495 ft)

Population (2021)
  - Total: 25
  - Density: 8.3/km^{2} (22/sq mi)
- Time zone: UTC+1 (CET)
  - Summer (DST): UTC+2 (CEST)
- Postal code: 44435 Divuša
- Area code: (+385) 44

Donja Oraovica (Serbian Cyrillic: Доња Ораовица) is a village in central Croatia, in the municipality of Dvor, Sisak-Moslavina County.

== Demographics ==
According to the 2011 census, the village of Donja Oraovica has 41 inhabitants. This represents 22.78% of its pre-war population according to the 1991 census.

The 1991 census recorded that 98.33% of the village population were ethnic Serbs (177/180), 0.55% were ethnic Croats (1/180), 0.55% were Yugoslavs (1/180) and 0.55% were of other/unknown ethnic origin (1/180).

Historical population 1857-2011
v

population	367	471	514	557	598	563	561	615	235	255	239	205	185	180	46	41
	1857	1869	1880	1890	1900	1910	1921	1931	1948	1953	1961	1971	1981	1991	2001	2011

Sources: Croatian Bureau of Statistics publications
