= Puska =

Coordinates: 45°19′N 16°48′E

- Village
- Interactive map of Puska
- Country: Croatia

Area
  - Total: 4.1 sq mi (10.6 km^{2})

Population (2021)
  - Total: 251
  - Density: 61.3/sq mi (23.7/km^{2})
- Time zone: UTC+1 (CET)
  - Summer (DST): UTC+2 (CEST)

Puska is a village in Croatia.
