= Tanac, Croatia =

Coordinates: 45°15′N 16°52′E

- Village
- Interactive map of Tanac, Croatia
- Country: Croatia
- County: Sisak-Moslavina County

Area
  - Total: 4.2 km^{2} (1.6 sq mi)

Population (2021)
  - Total: 95
  - Density: 23/km^{2} (59/sq mi)
- Time zone: UTC+1 (CET)
  - Summer (DST): UTC+2 (CEST)

Tanac, Croatia is a village in Croatia. It is connected by the D47 highway.
