= Brestača =

Settlement in Sisak-Moslavina County, Croatia

- Settlement
- Interactive map of Brestača
- Location of Brestača in Croatia
- Coordinates: 45°21′32″N 16°57′11″E
- Country: Croatia
- County: Sisak-Moslavina
- City: Novska

Area
  - Total: 18.6 km^{2} (7.2 sq mi)

Population (2021)
  - Total: 809
  - Density: 43.5/km^{2} (113/sq mi)
- Time zone: UTC+1 (CET)
  - Summer (DST): UTC+2 (CEST)
- Postal code: 44330 Novska
- Area code: +385 (0)44

Brestača is a settlement in the City of Novska in Croatia. In 2021, its population was 809.

== Demographics ==
Brestača: Population trends 1857–2021
v

population	389	396	393	567	666	707	735	807	810	865	882	942	981	1003	969	913	809
	1857	1869	1880	1890	1900	1910	1921	1931	1948	1953	1961	1971	1981	1991	2001	2011	2021

Sources: Croatian Bureau of Statistics publications
