= Trgovi =

Coordinates: 45°06′29″N 16°16′52″E

Trgovi Тргови (Serbian)
- Village
- Interactive map of Trgovi
- Country: Croatia
- Region: Continental Croatia (Banovina)
- County: Sisak-Moslavina
- Municipality: Dvor

Area
  - Total: 1.4 sq mi (3.7 km^{2})

Population (2021)
  - Total: 83
  - Density: 58/sq mi (22/km^{2})
- Time zone: UTC+1 (CET)
  - Summer (DST): UTC+2 (CEST)

Trgovi (Serbian Cyrillic: Тргови) is a village in Croatia. It is connected by the D6 highway.
