= Golubovac Divuški =

Coordinates: 45°08′N 16°26′E

Golubovac Divuški Голубовац Дивушки (Serbian)
- Village
- Interactive map of Golubovac Divuški
- Country: Croatia
- Region: Continental Croatia (Banovina)
- County: Sisak-Moslavina
- Municipality: Dvor

Area
  - Total: 0.93 sq mi (2.4 km^{2})

Population (2021)
  - Total: 61
  - Density: 66/sq mi (25/km^{2})
- Time zone: UTC+1 (CET)
  - Summer (DST): UTC+2 (CEST)

Golubovac Divuški (Serbian Cyrillic: Голубовац Дивушки) is a village in Croatia. It is connected by the D47 highway.
