= Gornja Paklenica =

Gornja Paklenica Горња Пакленица
- Village
- Interactive map of Gornja Paklenica
- Country: Bosnia and Herzegovina
- Entity: Republika Srpska
- Municipality: Doboj

Area
  - Total: 42 km^{2} (16 sq mi)
  - Land: 42 km^{2} (16 sq mi)
- Elevation: 639 m (2,096 ft)
  - Density: 9.5/km^{2} (25/sq mi)
- 403
- Time zone: UTC+1 (CET)
  - Summer (DST): UTC+2 (CEST)

Gornja Paklenica (Serbian: Горња Пакленица) is a village in the municipality of Doboj, Republika Srpska, Bosnia and Herzegovina. Gornja Paklenica is a populated place close to the city of Doboj, Republika Srpska, Bosnia and Herzegovina. According to the 2013 population census, 403 inhabitants lived in the settlement. It is one of the larger Ozren villages.
