= Struga Banska =

Struga Banska Струга Банска (in Serbian)
- Village
- Location within Croatia
- Coordinates: 45°6′4.96″N 16°23′14.32″E
- Country: Croatia
- Region: Continental Croatia (Banovina)
- County: Sisak-Moslavina
- Municipality: Dvor

Area
  - Total: 3.5 km^{2} (1.4 sq mi)

Population (2021)
  - Total: 67
  - Density: 19/km^{2} (50/sq mi)
- Time zone: UTC+1 (CET)
  - Summer (DST): UTC+2 (CEST)

Struga Banska (Serbian Cyrillic: Струга Банска) is a village on the river Una in central Croatia. It is connected by the D47 highway. The nearest larger towns are Dvor (Croatia) and Novi Grad (across the river in Bosnia).
