= Rajčići, Bosnia and Herzegovina =

Rajčići
- Village
- Location within Bosnia and Herzegovina
- Coordinates: 43.9311079°N 18.1511522°E
- Country: Bosnia and Herzegovina
- Entity: Federation of Bosnia and Herzegovina
- Canton: Zenica-Doboj
- Municipality: Visoko

Area
  - Total: 1.24 sq mi (3.22 km^{2})

Population (2013)
  - Total: 553
  - Density: 445/sq mi (172/km^{2})
- Time zone: UTC+1 (CET)
  - Summer (DST): UTC+2 (CEST)

Rajčići is a village in the municipality of Visoko, Bosnia and Herzegovina.

== Demographics ==
According to the 2013 census, its population was 553.

Ethnicity in 2013
Ethnicity	Number	Percentage
Bosniaks	541	97.8%
other/undeclared	12	2.2%
Total	553	100%
