= Orahovica, Zenica =

Orahovica Ораховица
- Village
- Location within Bosnia and Herzegovina
- Coordinates: 44.3246769°N 17.8434476°E
- Country: Bosnia and Herzegovina
- Entity: Federation of Bosnia and Herzegovina
- Canton: Zenica-Doboj
- Municipality: Zenica

Area
  - Total: 7.28 sq mi (18.86 km^{2})

Population (2013)
  - Total: 2,417
  - Density: 331.9/sq mi (128.2/km^{2})
- Time zone: UTC+1 (CET)
  - Summer (DST): UTC+2 (CEST)

Orahovica is a village in the City of Zenica, Bosnia and Herzegovina.

== Demographics ==
According to the 2013 census, its population was 2,417.

Ethnicity in 2013
| Ethnicity | Number | Percentage |
|---|---|---|
| Bosniaks | 2,404 | 99.5% |
| other/undeclared | 13 | 0.5% |
| Total | 2,417 | 100% |
