= Stara Subocka =

Settlement in Sisak-Moslavina County, Croatia

- Settlement
- Interactive map of Stara Subocka
- Location of Stara Subocka in Croatia
- Coordinates: 45°21′25″N 16°54′00″E
- Country: Croatia
- County: Sisak-Moslavina
- City: Novska

Area
  - Total: 15.9 km^{2} (6.1 sq mi)

Population (2021)
  - Total: 386
  - Density: 24.3/km^{2} (62.9/sq mi)
- Time zone: UTC+1 (CET)
  - Summer (DST): UTC+2 (CEST)
- Postal code: 44330 Novska
- Area code: +385 (0)44

Stara Subocka is a settlement in the City of Novska in Croatia. In 2021, its population was 386.

== Demographics ==
Stara Subocka: Population trends 1857–2021
v

population	759	890	790	751	1044	736	902	806	785	773	739	666	564	523	597	502	386
	1857	1869	1880	1890	1900	1910	1921	1931	1948	1953	1961	1971	1981	1991	2001	2011	2021

Sources: Croatian Bureau of Statistics publications
