= Nova Subocka =

Settlement in Sisak-Moslavina County, Croatia

- Settlement
- Interactive map of Nova Subocka
- Location of Nova Subocka in Croatia
- Coordinates: 45°22′19″N 16°55′16″E
- Country: Croatia
- County: Sisak-Moslavina
- City: Novska

Area
  - Total: 6.7 km^{2} (2.6 sq mi)

Population (2021)
  - Total: 570
  - Density: 85/km^{2} (220/sq mi)
- Time zone: UTC+1 (CET)
  - Summer (DST): UTC+2 (CEST)
- Postal code: 44330 Novska
- Area code: +385 (0)44

Nova Subocka is a settlement in the City of Novska in Croatia. In 2021, its population was 570.

== Demographics ==
Nova Subocka: Population trends 1857–2021
v

population				203		362	418	445	507	511	508	545	536	595	689	713	570
	1857	1869	1880	1890	1900	1910	1921	1931	1948	1953	1961	1971	1981	1991	2001	2011	2021

Sources: Croatian Bureau of Statistics publications
