= Bair, Croatia =

Coordinates: 45°23′N 17°02′E

Bair
- Village
- Interactive map of Bair
- Country: Croatia

Area
  - Total: 3.6 sq mi (9.2 km^{2})

Population (2021)
  - Total: 5
  - Density: 1.4/sq mi (0.54/km^{2})
- Time zone: UTC+1 (CET)
  - Summer (DST): UTC+2 (CEST)

Bair is a village in Croatia. It is connected by the D47 highway.
