= Orahovica, Žepče =

Orahovica Ораховица
- Village
- Location within Bosnia and Herzegovina
- Coordinates: 44.4228849°N 18.0434784°E
- Country: Bosnia and Herzegovina
- Entity: Federation of Bosnia and Herzegovina
- Canton: Zenica-Doboj
- Municipality: Žepče

Area
  - Total: 3.49 sq mi (9.03 km^{2})

Population (2013)
  - Total: 929
  - Density: 266/sq mi (103/km^{2})
- Time zone: UTC+1 (CET)
  - Summer (DST): UTC+2 (CEST)

Orahovica is a village in the municipality of Žepče, Bosnia and Herzegovina.

== Demographics ==
According to the 2013 census, its population was 929.

Ethnicity in 2013
| Ethnicity | Number | Percentage |
|---|---|---|
| Croats | 902 | 97.1% |
| Serbs | 24 | 2.6% |
| Bosniaks | 2 | 0.2% |
| other/undeclared | 1 | 0.1% |
| Total | 929 | 100% |
