= Kričke, Sisak-Moslavina County =

Settlement in Sisak-Moslavina County, Croatia

Kričke
- Settlement
- Interactive map of Kričke
- Location of Kričke in Croatia
- Coordinates: 45°22′08″N 17°05′38″E
- Country: Croatia
- County: Sisak-Moslavina
- City: Novska

Area
  - Total: 27.3 km^{2} (10.5 sq mi)

Population (2021)
  - Total: 10
  - Density: 0.37/km^{2} (0.95/sq mi)
- Time zone: UTC+1 (CET)
  - Summer (DST): UTC+2 (CEST)
- Postal code: 44330 Novska
- Area code: +385 (0)44

Kričke is a settlement in the City of Novska in Croatia. In 2021, its population was 10.

== Demographics ==
Kričke: Population trends 1857–2021
v

| population | 289 | 377 | 465 | 581 | 633 | 612 | 597 | 584 | 451 | 429 | 379 | 284 | 213 | 170 | 21 | 23 | 10 |
| | 1857 | 1869 | 1880 | 1890 | 1900 | 1910 | 1921 | 1931 | 1948 | 1953 | 1961 | 1971 | 1981 | 1991 | 2001 | 2011 | 2021 |

Sources: Croatian Bureau of Statistics publications
