= Kuljani, Croatia =

Coordinates: 45°10′48″N 16°28′19″E

Kuljani Куљани (Serbian)
- Village
- Interactive map of Kuljani
- Country: Croatia
- Region: Continental Croatia (Banovina)
- County: Sisak-Moslavina
- Municipality: Dvor

Area
  - Total: 0.97 sq mi (2.5 km^{2})

Population (2021)
  - Total: 79
  - Density: 82/sq mi (32/km^{2})
- Time zone: UTC+1 (CET)
  - Summer (DST): UTC+2 (CEST)

Kuljani, Croatia (Serbian Cyrillic: Куљани) is a village in Croatia. It is connected by the D47 highway.
