= Divuša =

Coordinates: 45°09′N 16°27′E

Divuša Дивуша (Serbian)
- Village
- Interactive map of Divuša
- Country: Croatia
- Region: Continental Croatia (Banovina)
- County: Sisak-Moslavina
- Municipality: Dvor

Area
  - Total: 0.89 sq mi (2.3 km^{2})

Population (2021)
  - Total: 39
  - Density: 44/sq mi (17/km^{2})
- Time zone: UTC+1 (CET)
  - Summer (DST): UTC+2 (CEST)

Divuša (Serbian Cyrillic: Дивуша) is a village in Croatia. It is connected by the D47 highway.

== Religion ==
=== Roman Catholic Church of Saint Catherine ===
Roman Catholic parish in Divuša was firstly mentioned in 1271 as a local parish under the Order of Cistercians Abbey in Topusko. The first church of Saint Stephen was mentioned in canonical visitations in 1334, and the wooden church of Saint Catherine was constructed in 1699. The church was burned in a battle in 1737 and the current church was constructed in 1748-1750 period. The church got its current shape in 1805. It was destroyed by Serb forces and Yugoslav People's Army in 1991 during the Croatian War of Independence when the village was a part of self-proclaimed Republic of Serbian Krajina, and was reconstructed once again after the end of war.
