= Kozibrod =

Coordinates: 45°09′N 16°28′E

Kozibrod Козиброд (Serbian)
- Village
- Interactive map of Kozibrod
- Country: Croatia
- Region: Continental Croatia (Banovina)
- County: Sisak-Moslavina
- Municipality: Dvor

Area
  - Total: 1.0 sq mi (2.6 km^{2})

Population (2021)
  - Total: 51
  - Density: 51/sq mi (20/km^{2})
- Time zone: UTC+1 (CET)
  - Summer (DST): UTC+2 (CEST)

Kozibrod (Serbian Cyrillic: Козиброд) is a village in Croatia. It is connected by the D47 highway.
