= Paklenica, Sisak-Moslavina County =

Settlement in Sisak-Moslavina County, Croatia

Paklenica
- Settlement
- Interactive map of Paklenica
- Location of Paklenica in Croatia
- Coordinates: 45°19′08″N 17°01′19″E
- Country: Croatia
- County: Sisak-Moslavina
- City: Novska

Area
  - Total: 12.7 km^{2} (4.9 sq mi)

Population (2021)
  - Total: 210
  - Density: 17/km^{2} (43/sq mi)
- Time zone: UTC+1 (CET)
  - Summer (DST): UTC+2 (CEST)
- Postal code: 44330 Novska
- Area code: +385 (0)44

Paklenica is a settlement in the City of Novska in Croatia. In 2021, its population was 210.

== Demographics ==
Paklenica: Population trends 1857–2021
v

| population | 127 | 393 | 452 | 527 | 554 | 653 | 671 | 690 | 348 | 439 | 556 | 541 | 535 | 478 | 296 | 279 | 210 |
| | 1857 | 1869 | 1880 | 1890 | 1900 | 1910 | 1921 | 1931 | 1948 | 1953 | 1961 | 1971 | 1981 | 1991 | 2001 | 2011 | 2021 |

Sources: Croatian Bureau of Statistics publications
