= Kozarice =

Coordinates: 45°23′N 16°58′E

- Village
- Interactive map of Kozarice
- Country: Croatia
- County: Sisak-Moslavina County

Area
  - Total: 15.9 km^{2} (6.1 sq mi)

Population (2021)
  - Total: 320
  - Density: 20/km^{2} (52/sq mi)
- Time zone: UTC+1 (CET)
  - Summer (DST): UTC+2 (CEST)

Kozarice is a village located in Croatia.
