= Gornja Oraovica =

Gornja Oraovica Горња Ораовица (Serbian)
- Village
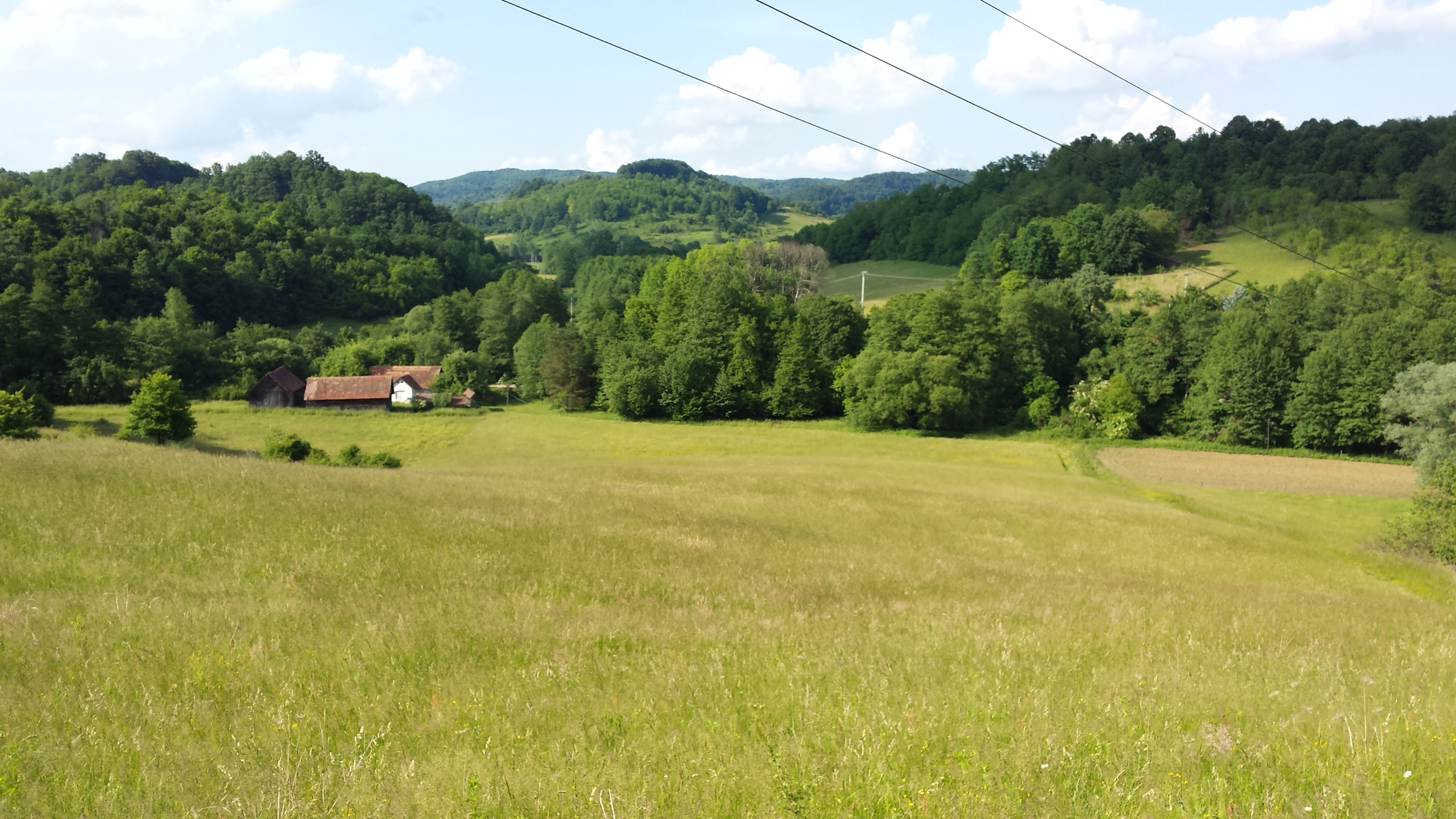

- Location of Gornja Oraovica in Croatia
- Coordinates: 45°10′00″N 16°25′00″E
- Country: Croatia
- Region: Continental Croatia (Banovina)
- County: Sisak-Moslavina
- Municipality: Dvor

Area
  - Total: 4.0 km^{2} (1.5 sq mi)
- Elevation: 168 m (551 ft)

Population (2021)
  - Total: 19
  - Density: 4.8/km^{2} (12/sq mi)
- Time zone: UTC+1 (CET)
  - Summer (DST): UTC+2 (CEST)
- Postal code: 44435
- Area code: (+385) 44

Gornja Oraovica (Serbian Cyrillic: Горња Ораовица) is a village in central Croatia, in the municipality of Dvor, Sisak-Moslavina County.

== Demographics ==
According to the 2011 census, the village of Gornja Oraovica has 36 inhabitants. This represents 31.58% of its pre-war population according to the 1991 census.

The 1991 census recorded that 98.25% of the village population were ethnic Serbs (112/114) and 1.75% were of other/unknown ethnic origin (2/114).

Historical population 1857-2011
v

population									243	248	208	153	140	114	37	36
	1857	1869	1880	1890	1900	1910	1921	1931	1948	1953	1961	1971	1981	1991	2001	2011

Sources: Croatian Bureau of Statistics publications
