= Dvor, Croatia =

Dvor Двор (Serbian)
- Municipality
- Općina Dvor; Municipality of Dvor
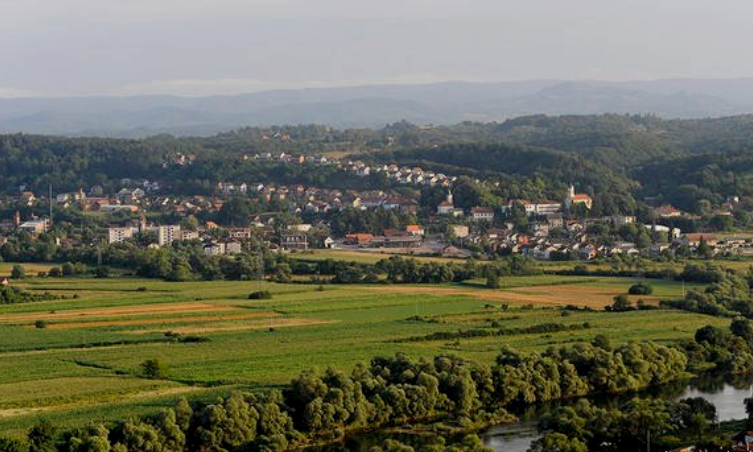
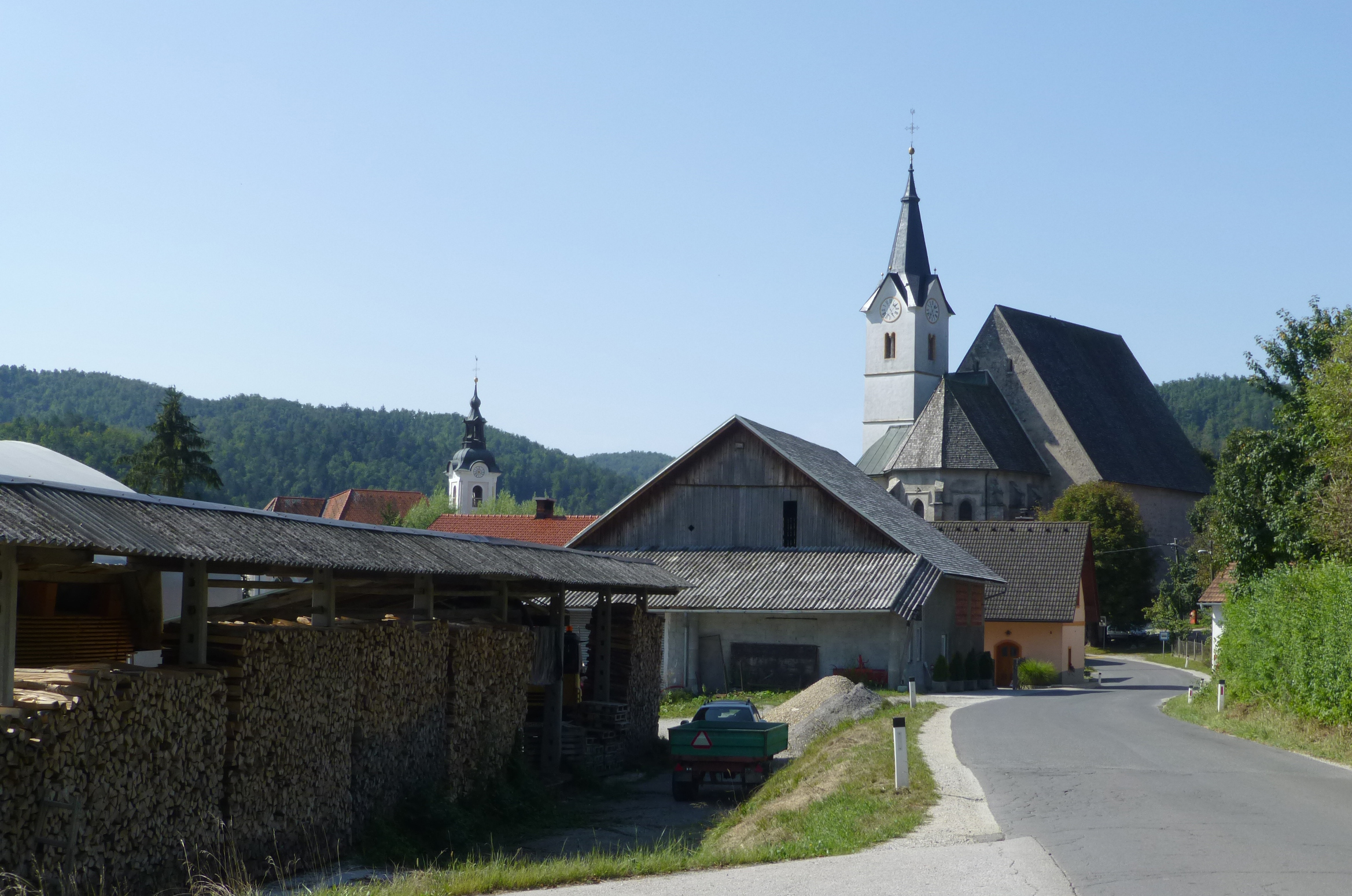
- Panoramic view Catholic and Orthodox church in Dvor

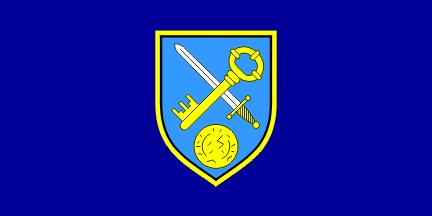
- Flag Coat of arms
- Interactive map of Dvor
- Location of Dvor within Croatia
- Coordinates: 45°04′00″N 16°22′00″E
- Country: Croatia
- Region: Central Croatia (Banovina)
- County: Sisak-Moslavina County

Government
  - Mayor: Nikola Arbutina (SDSS)

Area
  - Municipality: 505.7 km^{2} (195.3 sq mi)
  - Urban: 5.5 km^{2} (2.1 sq mi)
- Elevation: 131 m (430 ft)

Population (2021)
  - Municipality: 2,996
  - Density: 5.924/km^{2} (15.34/sq mi)
  - Urban: 809
  - Urban density: 150/km^{2} (380/sq mi)
- Time zone: UTC+1 (CET)
  - Summer (DST): UTC+2 (CEST)
- Postal code: 44440 Dvor
- Website: dvor.hr

Dvor (Serbian Cyrillic: Двор) is a municipality in the Banovina region in central Croatia. Administratively, it belongs to the Sisak-Moslavina County and is located across the Una River from Novi Grad in Bosnia and Herzegovina. Dvor is an underdeveloped municipality which is statistically classified as the First Category Area of Special State Concern by the Government of Croatia.

== Languages and names ==
The town of Dvor was named Dvor na Uni in the Kingdom of Yugoslavia. As a majority of the present-day inhabitants are Serbs, the Serbian language is co-official as a second official language, alongside Croatian, which is the official first language. As of 2023, only some of the legal requirements for the fulfillment of bilingual standards have not been carried out. Official buildings and seals do have Cyrillic signage, but not street or traffic signs. Cyrillic is for municipal meeting documents, but on few other official documents. There are public legal and administrative employees proficient in the script.

== History ==
Dvor used to be a district capital in the historic Zagreb County, an administrative unit within the Kingdom of Croatia-Slavonia, which ceased to exist in 1918. In 1929 Dvor was placed in Vrbas Banovina within Kingdom of Yugoslavia. It was not incorporated into Croatia when the Banovina of Croatia province was formed in 1939. In 1941, the town became a part of the Independent State of Croatia. After the end of World War II, the town officially became part of SR Croatia within SFR Yugoslavia, which largely followed the historic border of the Kingdom of Croatia-Slavonia in this area.

During the Croatian War of Independence (1991–1995), Dvor was within the breakaway Republic of Serbian Krajina, but following Operation Storm in 1995 the municipality returned to Croatian control. Most of the Serbian population was evacuated from Dvor during Operation Storm of which some had returned.

== Demographics ==
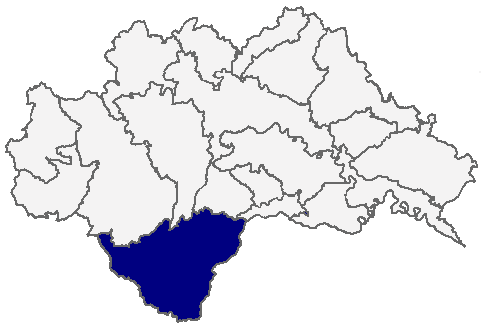
Image of Dvor Municipality within Sisak-Moslavina County

According to Population Censuses, the majority of the population are ethnic Serbs. Between 1991 and 2011 the number of Serb residents fell from 14,555 to 4,005, a drop from 86.5% of the population to 71.9%. The number of Croat residents remained essentially the same, 1,395 and 1,440, respectively, but given the population decline, its size, as a percentage of the population, rose from 9.58% to 25.85% of the population of Dvor.

Ethnic Composition
Year	Serbs	%	Croats	%	Total
1931	23,452	88.24%	3,073	11.56%	26,579
1948	21,736	89.44%	2,248	10.34%	21,736
1953	22,658	89.6%	2,290	10.11%	22,658
1961	21,354	89.84%	2,060	9.95%	21,354
1971	18,359	88.38%	1,876	10.22%	18,359
1981	16,507	80.93%	1,525	9.35%	16,507
1991	14,555	86,50%	1,395	9,58%	14,555
2001	3,495	60.87%	1,943	33.84%	5,742
2011	4,005	71.90%	1,440	25.85%	5,570

== Politics ==
=== Minority councils and representatives ===
Directly elected minority councils and representatives are tasked with consulting tasks for the local or regional authorities in which they are advocating for minority rights and interests, integration into public life and participation in the management of local affairs. At the 2023 Croatian national minorities councils and representatives elections Serbs of Croatia fulfilled legal requirements to elect 10 members minority council of the Municipality of Dvor.

== Religion ==
=== Serbian Orthodox Church of Saint George ===
Serbian Orthodox Church of Saint George was constructed in short period of 6 months in 1880. The construction was supported by baron Franjo Filipović who donated 12000 Forintas for this task. As the building was constructed in relative rush it was perceived as mediocre in architectural style and therefore during its reconstruction in 1957 major adaptations were done on the basis of the model of church in Javoranj. Interior frescoes from 1904 are, together with religious elements, representing also the Kosovo Cycle.

=== Roman Catholic Chapel of Saint Peter and Paul ===
Roman Catholic Chapel of Saint Peter and Paul was constructed in 1848. It served as the model for larger orthodox church in the village. It was reconstructed in 1971, then destroyed in 1991 during the Croatian War of Independence when the village was a part of self-proclaimed Republic of Serbian Krajina, and was reconstructed once again after the end of war.

== Settlements ==
According to the 2011 census, the municipality consists of 64 settlements:

- Bansko Vrpolje - 65
- Buinja - 10
- Buinjski Riječani - 12
- Čavlovica - 2
- Ćore - 33
- Divuša - 63
- Donja Oraovica - 41
- Donja Stupnica - 87
- Donji Dobretin - 20
- Donji Javoranj - 149
- Donji Žirovac - 46
- Draškovac - 22
- Dvor - 1,406
- Gage - 66
- Glavičani - 19
- Golubovac Divuški - 85
- Gorička - 109
- Gornja Oraovica - 36
- Gornja Stupnica - 61
- Gornji Dobretin - 9
- Gornji Javoranj - 65
- Gornji Žirovac - 22
- Grabovica - 32
- Grmušani - 118
- Gvozdansko - 42
- Hrtić - 112
- Javnica - 48
- Javornik - 107
- Jovac - 20
- Kepčije - 74
- Kobiljak - 0
- Komora - 15
- Kosna - 35
- Kotarani - 3
- Kozibrod - 70
- Kuljani - 98
- Lotine - 43
- Ljeskovac - 57
- Ljubina - 100
- Majdan - 11
- Matijevići - 645
- Ostojići - 5
- Paukovac - 67
- Pedalj - 59
- Rogulje - 29
- Rudeži - 1
- Rujevac - 254
- Sočanica - 23
- Stanić Polje - 16
- Struga Banska - 115
- Šakanlije - 32
- Šegestin - 35
- Švrakarica - 53
- Trgovi - 100
- Udetin - 45
- Unčani - 189
- Vanići - 81
- Volinja - 77
- Zakopa - 70
- Zamlača - 144
- Zrin - 18
- Zrinska Draga - 35
- Zrinski Brđani - 63
- Zut - 1

Three of the villages: Čavlovica, Kobiljak and Zut, have not yet been re-connected to the public electrical grid.

== See also ==
- Banovina
- Dvor massacre

== Notable people ==
- Borislav Ćorković
