= Zamlača, Sisak-Moslavina County =

Zamlača Замлача (in Serbian)
- Village
- Location within Croatia
- Coordinates: 45°05′25″N 16°22′49″E
- Country: Croatia
- Region: Continental Croatia (Banovina)
- County: Sisak-Moslavina
- Municipality: Dvor

Area
  - Total: 0.97 sq mi (2.5 km^{2})

Population (2021)
  - Total: 75
  - Density: 78/sq mi (30/km^{2})
- Time zone: UTC+1 (CET)
  - Summer (DST): UTC+2 (CEST)

Zamlača (Serbian Cyrillic: Замлача) is a village in Croatia. It is connected by the D47 highway.
