= Bročice =

Coordinates: 45°18′N 16°57′E

- Village
- Interactive map of Bročice
- Country: Croatia
- County: Sisak-Moslavina County
- Municipality: Novska

Area
  - Total: 18.9 km^{2} (7.3 sq mi)

Population (2021)
  - Total: 787
  - Density: 41.6/km^{2} (108/sq mi)
- Time zone: UTC+1 (CET)
  - Summer (DST): UTC+2 (CEST)

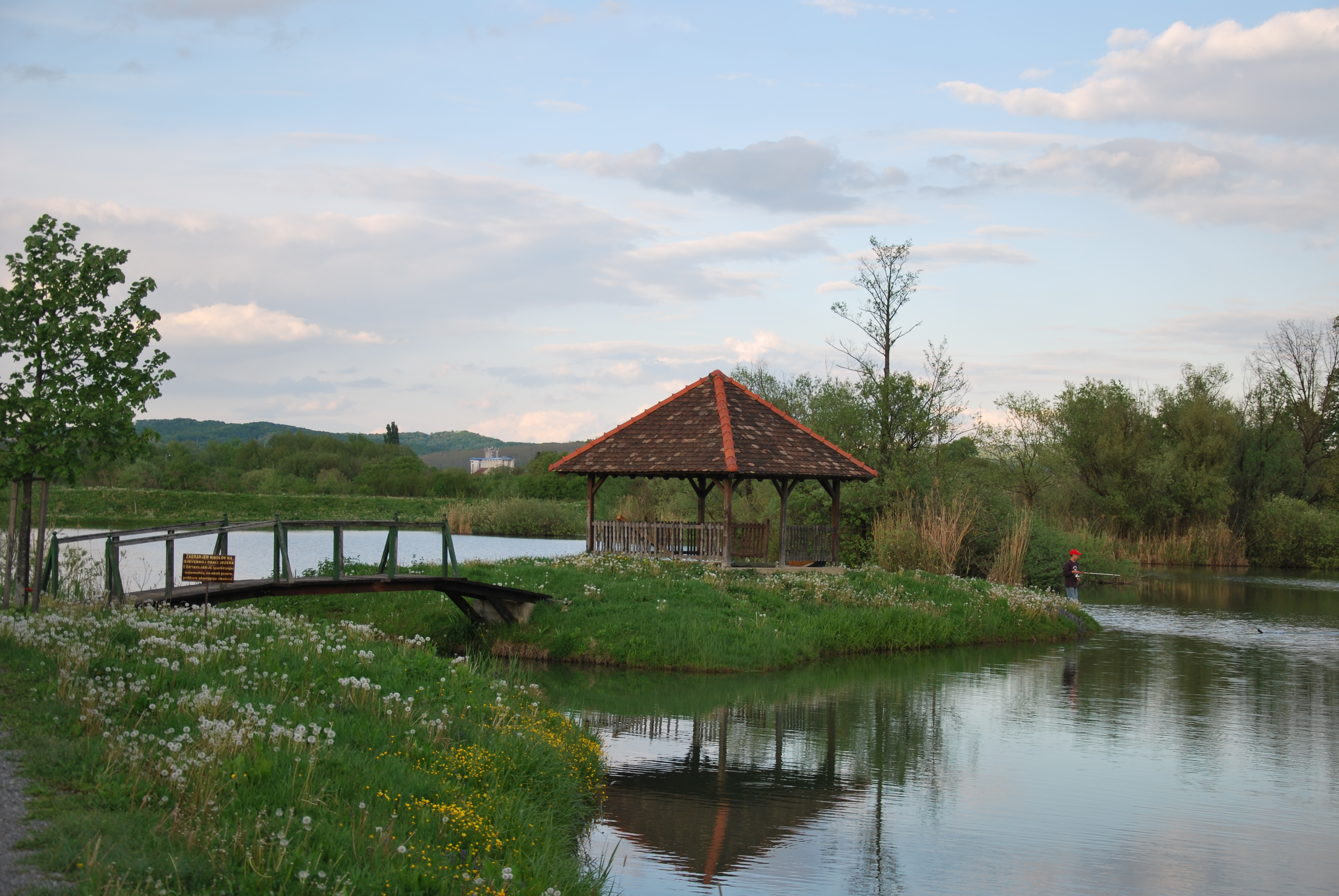

Bročice is a village in Croatia.
