= Karapandža =

Karapandža is a Serbian surname derived from a type of "bogeyman" found in Southeast European folklore. Etymologically, it is Ottoman Turkish in origin and literally means "black claw" — see Karakoncolos.

The Jasenovac concentration camp had individual murder victims identified with the surname Karapandža, from Gornja Trebinja, Jazavica and Majske Poljane and from Kupinečki Kraljevec.

People

- Stevo Karapandža (born 1947), a popular celebrity chef in former Yugoslavia.
- Petar Karapandža (1700s), Habsburg painter and monk

== See also ==
- Kurepa
