= Kurepa =

Kurepa (Serbian: Курепа) is a Serbian surname. The surname has its origin in one of the oldest Drobnjak clan brotherhoods. At least 5 people with the surname were killed in the Jasenovac concentration camp. It may refer to:

- Đuro Kurepa (1907–1993), Yugoslav mathematician.
- Svetozar Kurepa (1929–2010), Yugoslav mathematician.
- Milan Kurepa (1933–2000), Serbian atomic physicist.

== See also ==
- Kurepa tree, a mathematical object from set theory
