= MIOC =

MIOC may refer to:

- XV Gymnasium, Zagreb
- III Gymnasium Split
