= Aleksandar Ivić =

Serbian mathematician and university teacher

- Born: March 6, 1949
- Died: December 27, 2020 (aged 71)
- Occupation: Mathematician

Aleksandar Ivić (March 6, 1949 – December 27, 2020) was a Serbian mathematician, specializing in analytic number theory. He gained an international reputation and gave lectures on the Riemann zeta function at universities around the world.

== Biography ==
Aleksandar Ivić was born in Belgrade to two renowned linguists, the academician Pavle Ivić (1924–1999) and the academician Milka Ivić (1923–2011). His paternal grandfather was the historian Aleksa Ivić (1881–1948) and his maternal great-grandfather was the poet Vojislav Ilić (1862–1894), the son of the writer and minister of justice Jovan Ilić (1824–1901).

In 1967, Aleksandar Ivić successfully participated in the International Mathematical Olympiad. He graduated in 1971 from the University of Novi Sad with a bachelor's degree in science. As a graduate student in Faculty of Sciences of the University of Belgrade, he graduated with a master's degree in 1973 and a doctorate in 1975. His doctoral dissertation O nekim klasama aritmetičkih funkcija koje su vezane za raspodelu prostih brojeva (On certain classes of arithmetic functions linked to the distribution of prime numbers) was supervised by Đuro Kurepa. After working as an assistant from 1971 to 1976 at the Faculty of Science and Mathematics at the Faculty of Science and Mathematics at the University of Novi Sad, Ivić was appointed as assistant professor at the Faculty of Mining and Geology at the University of Belgrade in the Department of Applied Mathematics. There he was an assistant professor from 1976 to 1982, an associate professor from 1982 to 1988, and a full professor from 1988 to 2014, when he retired as professor emeritus.

Ivić was a member of the Mathematical Institute of the Serbian Academy of Sciences and Arts (SANU) and served on the editorial boards of several international journals. He was a plenary lecturer at several international scientific conferences. He was a visiting professor at several universities around the world in Japan, China, Brazil, Finland, and elsewhere. He was recognized as one of the world's leading experts on analytic number theory related to the Riemann hypothesis and the Lindelöf hypothesis.

The bibliography of articles authored or coauthored by Ivić contains 231 titles. He was elected in 1988 a corresponding member in 1988 and in 2000 a regular member of the Serbian Academy of Sciences and Arts (SANU).

His Erdős number is 1, as he published papers with him in 1980 and 1986.

== Personal life ==
Aleksander Ivić married Milika Avramov in 1976. They divorced in 1990. From his first marriage, he became the father of two daughters, Natalija (born 1980) and Emilija (born 1984). His second marriage was to Sanda Rašković Ivić, whom he married in 1996. They became the parents of a daughter and two sons. Their younger son Jovan (1997–2022) committed suicide.

Ivić died in Belgrade.

== Selected publications ==
=== Articles ===
- Ivić, Aleksandar (1973). "An asymptotic formula for elements of a semigroup of integers". Matematički Vesnik. 10(25) (57). Belgrade: 255–257.
- Ivić, Aleksandar (1973). "An application of Dirichlet series to certain arithmetical functions". Mathematica Balkanica. 3: 158–165.
- Ivić, Aleksandar (1975). "On certain functions that generalize von Mangoldt's function $\Lambda(n)$". Matematički Vesnik. 12(27) (60). Belgrade: 361–366.
- De Koninck, Jean-Marie; Ivić, Aleksandar (1978). "An asymptotic formula for reciprocals of logarithms of certain multiplicative functions". Canadian Mathematical Bulletin. 21 (4): 409–413. doi:10.4153/CMB-1978-072-4.
- Ivić, Aleksandar; Erdős, Paul (1980). "Estimates for sums involving the largest prime factor of an integer and certain related additive functions". Studia scientiarum mathematicarum hungarica. 15. Budapest: 183–199. abstract
- Ivić, Aleksandar; Schwarz, Wolfgang Karl (1980). "Remarks on some number-theoretical functional equations". Aequationes Mathematicae. 20. Waterloo, Ontario: 80–89. doi:10.1007/BF02190496.
- Ivić, Aleksandar (1980). "Exponent pairs and the zeta-function of Riemann". Studia scientiarum mathematicarum hungarica (15). Budapest: 157–181.
- Ivić, Aleksandar; Pomerance, Carl (1984). "Estimates for certain sums involving the largest prime factor of an integer". Actes de la Conférence de Budapest sur la théorie des nombres de juillet 1981. Amsterdam: North Holland: 769–789.
- Erdős, Paul; Ivić, Aleksandar; Pomerance, Carl (1986). "On sums involving reciprocals of the largest prime factor of an integer" (PDF). Glasnik Matematički. 21 (41). Zagreb: 283–300.
- Ivić, Aleksandar; Tenenbaum, Gérald (1986). "Local densities over integers free of large prime factors" (PDF). Quarterly Journal of Mathematics. 37 (2). Oxford: 401–417. doi:10.1093/qmath/37.4.401.
- Ivić, Aleksandar (1987). "The general divisor problem". Journal of Number Theory. 27. Columbus, Ohio: 73–91. doi:10.1016/0022-314X(87)90053-9.
- Ivić, Aleksandar; Jutila, Matti (1988). "Gaps between consecutive zeros of the Riemann zeta-function". Monatshefte für Mathematik. 105. Vienna: 59–73. doi:10.1007/BF01471104.
- Hafner, James Lee; Ivić, Aleksandar (1989). "On the mean square of the Riemann zeta-function on the critical line" (PDF). Journal of Number Theory. 32 (2). Columbus, Ohio: 151–191. doi:10.1016/0022-314X(89)90024-3.
- Ivić, Aleksandar; Motohashi, Yōichi (1990). "A note on the mean-value of the zeta and L-functions". Proceedings of the Japan Academy, Series A. 66: 150–152. doi:10.3792/pjaa.66.150.
- Ivić, Aleksandar; Balasubramanian, Rajangam; Ramachandra, Kanakanahalli (1992). "The mean square of the Riemann zeta-function on the line $\sigma = 1$". L'Enseignement mathématique. 38. Geneva: 13–25.
- Ivić, Aleksandar; Kiuchi, Isao (1994). "On some integrals involving the Riemann zeta-function in the critical strip". Publikacije Elektrotehničkog fakulteta. 5. Belgrade: 19–28.
- Ivić, Aleksandar; Mijajlović, Žarko (1995). "On Kurepa's problems in number theory". Publications de l'Institut mathématique. 57 (71). Belgrade: 19–28. arXiv preprint
- Ivić, Aleksandar (1995). "An approximate functional equation for a class of Dirichlet series". The Journal of Analysis. 3. Madras: 241–252.
- Gutman, Ivan; Ivić, Aleksandar (1996). "On Matula numbers". Discrete Mathematics. 150 (1–3): 131–142. doi:10.1016/0012-365X(95)00182-V.
- Ivić, Aleksandar (1998). "The Voronoi identity via the Laplace transform". The Ramanujan Journal. 2 (1–2): 39–45. doi:10.1023/A:1009753723245.
- Ivić, Aleksandar; Matsumoto, Kohji; Tanigawa, Yoshio (1999). "On Riesz means of the coefficients of the Rankin-Selberg series". Mathematical Proceedings of the Cambridge Philosophical Society. 127 (1): 117–131. Bibcode:1999MPCPS.127..117I. doi:10.1017/S0305004199003564. hdl:2237/10255.
- Balazard, Michel; Ivić, Aleksandar (2000). "The mean square of the logarithm of the zeta-function". Glasgow Mathematical Journal. 42 (2): 157–166. doi:10.1017/S0017089500020012.
- Ivić, Aleksandar (2001). "On sums of Hecke series in short intervals". Journal de Théorie des Nombres de Bordeaux. 13 (2): 453–468. arXiv:math/0311374. doi:10.5802/jtnb.333 (inactive 25 January 2026).
- Ivić, Aleksandar (2004). "On the integral of Hardy's function". Archiv der Mathematik. 83. Bâle-Stuttgart: 41–47. arXiv:0907.3803. doi:10.1007/s00013-003-4892-9. arXiv preprint
- Ivić, Aleksandar (2005). "The Mellin transform of the square of Riemann's zeta-function". International Journal of Number Theory. 1: 65–73. arXiv:math/0411040. doi:10.1142/S1793042105000042.

=== Books ===
- Ivić, Aleksandar; De Koninck, Jean-Marie (1980). Topics in arithmetical functions: asymptotic formulae for sums of reciprocals of arithmetical functions and related results. Amsterdam: North Holland.
- Ivić, Aleksandar (1983). Topics in recent zeta-function theory. Orsay: Publications mathématiques d'Orsay.
- Ivić, Aleksandar (1985). The Riemann zeta-function. New York: John Wiley & Sons.
  - Ivić, Aleksandar (2003). The Riemann zeta-function (2nd ed.). New York: Dover. ISBN 978-0-486-42813-0.
  - Ivic, Aleksandar (12 July 2012). 2012 edition. Courier Corporation. ISBN 978-0-486-14004-9.
- Ivić, Aleksandar (1991). Lectures on Mean Values of the Riemann Zeta Function (PDF). Bombay: Tata Institute of Fundamental Research.
- Ivić, Aleksandar; Vujić, Slobodan (1991). Matematički metodi u rudarstvu i geologiji (Mathematical methods in mining and geology) (in Serbian). Belgrade: Faculty of mines and geology of the University of Belgrade.
- Ivić, Aleksandar (1996). Uvod u analiticku teoriju brojeva (Introduction to analytic number theory) (in Serbian). Sremski Karlovci-Novi Sad: Izdavačka knjižarnica Zorana Stojanovića.
- Ivić, A. (2013). The Theory of Hardy's Z-Function. Cambridge Tracts in Mathematics, 196. Cambridge University Press. ISBN 978-1-107-02883-8.
