= Čukur Fountain incident =

1862 conflict in Belgrade

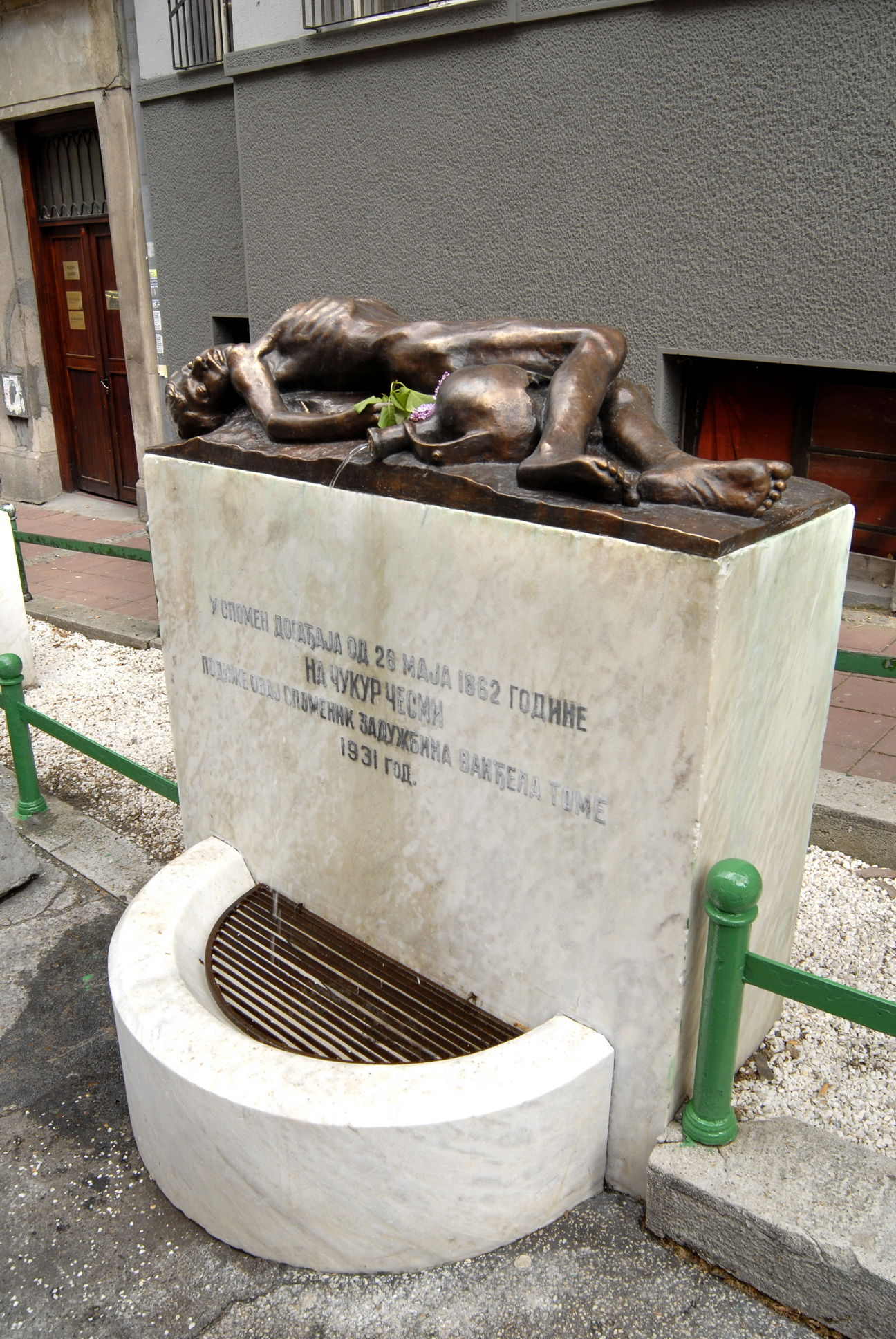
Čukur Fountain monument.

The Čukur Fountain incident (Serbian: Инцидент на Чукур-чесми/Incident na Čukur-česmi) refers to a series of events in June 1862 in Belgrade, at the time the capital of the Ottoman subject state of Serbia. On 15 June (O.S. 3 June) a group of Ottoman nizami (soldiers) and Serbs quarreled by the Čukur Fountain, ending with the murder of a young Serb apprentice boy, which resulted in civil unrest and the bombardment of Belgrade by Ottoman troops. In the wake of the incident, a Great Power brokered conference was held in Constantinople which resulted in a reduction of Turkish citizens and troops on Serbian soil.

== Background ==
Since 1813, with the Ottoman suppression of the First Serbian Uprising (1804–13), the city of Belgrade had been under a type of dual government. The Belgrade Fortress was garrisoned by Ottoman soldiers and the surrounding part of Belgrade was inhabited by "Turks", primarily the families of the soldiers, living under an Ottoman administration. The rest of Belgrade was inhabited by Serbs under their own administration. Prior to the events of June 1862, there had been a series of conflicts between the Serbians and Turks.

== Events ==
=== Quarrel ===
The event near the Čukur Fountain happened in the afternoon of 15 June 1862 (3 June according to the old calendar) on Dobračina Street in Belgrade. It was a hot summer day and many people were drinking water from a well including a young apprentice named Sava Petković, Turkish nizame (soldiers) and others. A fight broke out between Petković and one or more of the Turkish soldiers. Accounts of the events differ; Petković was either driven off and beaten, stabbed with a bayonet or hit on the head with the water pitcher. Whatever the means, Petković was killed.

Serbian gendarmes arrived quickly and arrested the soldiers. However, more Turkish soldiers arrived and a verbal dispute began. An interpreter with the Belgrade police, Sima Nešić, tried to mediate between the Turkish soldiers and the Serbian gendarmes, but the Turkish soldiers started shooting and Nešić was killed. The commander of the Serbian guard, Ivko Prokić, tried to remove the Turks from the scene but more shots were fired and the incident escalated into a citywide conflict which lasted the entire night.

=== Riot ===
The news about the incident spread around Belgrade, and Serbian rioters armed themselves with old guns, yataghans (swords) and handžars (knives), and quickly overtook the Varoš Gate, and destroyed the Sava and Stambol gates.

=== Truce ===
On the following day, 16 June, a truce was worked out by the foreign consuls in the city, especially John Augustus Longworth, British Consul-General. Under the terms of the truce, the Pasha in charge of the fortress agreed to remove his police from the town and return them into the fortress, and the Serbian prime minister, Ilija Garašanin, in turn, guaranteed their safety during the move.

=== Bombardment ===
On 17 June, the Pasha summoned the consuls to the fortress and while they were still underway, 56 fortress cannons began to shell the Serb town (varoš) of Belgrade, in an event known in historiography as the bombardment of Belgrade (Serbian: бомбардовање Београда). The attack began 9 o'clock, the time when two Serb victims of the past incident had a ceremonial funeral, lasted until the afternoon and did a great deal of material damage. About 50 civilians and soldiers died, about 20 houses were burnt down, and another 357 damaged. The cause of the bombing is unknown. Some sources suggested that the bombardment was ordered by the Pasha, triggered by Serbians firing muskets at the fortress. British Longworth, on the other hand, concluded that the bombardment was "the mere result of panic and false alarm". It is concluded that the dissatisfied Turkish soldiers pushed Ašir-paša, the Ottoman commander, to bomb the town. The bombing ended when the British Consul-General Longworth intervened.

=== Great Powers intervention ===
Prince Mihailo Obrenović III, who was in Šabac at the time, returned to Belgrade immediately. During July of the same year, in Kanlıca, near Constantinople, the negotiations about the independence of Serbia started, with the participation of France, England, Russia and Austria. It was decided that the Turkish population must leave Serbia and, during the following year, more than eight thousand Turks were displaced.

The Porte agreed to entrust some of the towns to Mihailo: first Belgrade, then Kladovo, Smederevo and Šabac, and then many more. In 1867, Duke Mihailo obtained the keys of the Belgrade fortress, and the ceremony was held on 18 April on the Kalemegdan.

== Aftermath and legacy ==
Police Day on 12 June commemorates the actions of the Gendarmery during the incident, serving as the official professional holiday of the Police of Serbia and Interior Ministry.

On the site of the incident, a fountain with a sculpture of a boy with a broken jug was built in 1931, the work of Simeon Roksandić. Simina Street, near Čukur Fountain, is named after Sima Nešić, the young interpreter who died while trying to mediate between the Serbs and Turks during this incident. Sima Nešić stands as a symbol of reconciliation lost among hostile and incomprehending voices.

== Sources ==
- Jovan S.Dajković, Belgrade and the Čukur Fountain incident, GMGB, book IV, Belgrade 1957, 313–326.
- Nikola Tasić (1995). Историја Београда. Балканолошки институт САНУ. pp. 184–. ISBN 9788671790215.
- Историјски часопис 28 (1981). Istorijski institut. 1 August 1981. pp. 117–. GGKEY:RL51KUQ6R3Y.
- Мирослав Јовановић (2005). Живети у Београду: 1851-1867. Историјски архив Београда. ISBN 978-86-80481-08-1.
- Живети у Београду: документа управе града Београд. Историјски архив Београда. 2005.
- Владимир Живанчевић. Гласник Етнографског музеја у Београду књ. 26. Etnografski muzej u Beogradu. pp. 156–. GGKEY:SW93K9QPS7K.
- Vladimir Stojančević (1990). Srbija i oslobodilački pokret na Balkanskom poluostrvu u XIX veku. Zavod za udžbenike i nastavna sredstva.
- Zavičaj: kalendar. Matica iseljenika Srbije. 1962.
- Nikola B. Popović; Nikola Kusovac; Desanka Milošević; Velimir Vesović (1991). Ilustrovana istorija Srba: Srbija 1858-1903. Litera. ISBN 9788674670248.
- Godis̆njak grada Beograda. Beogradske novine. 1979.
- Jаша Томић (1896). О узроцима злочина. Српска штампарија дра Светозара Милетића.
- Богдан Љ Поповић (2010). Дипломатска историја Србије. Завод за Уџбенике. ISBN 9788617169754.
- Nikola Trajković (1977). Stari Beograd. Vuk Karadžić.
- Мирослав Јовановић (2005). Живети у Београду: 1851-1867. Историјски архив Београда. ISBN 978-86-80481-08-1.
