= Police Day =

Police appreciation day

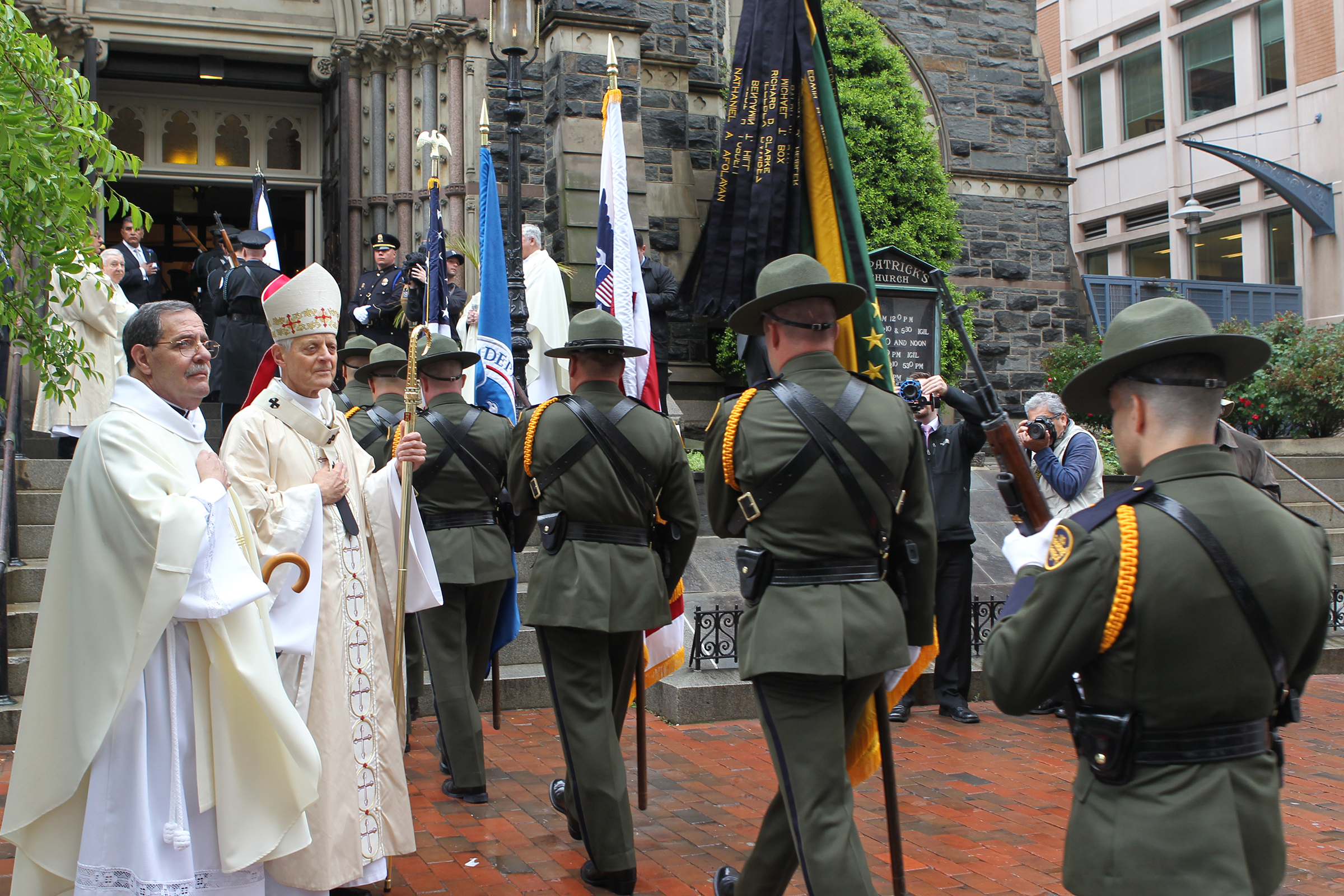
A color guard from U.S. Customs and Border Protection during a Police Week Blue Mass in 2013

Several nations observe or formerly observed a Police Day to recognize the professional holiday or anniversary of their national police force.

== By country ==
=== Armenia ===
Celebrated on 16 April, Police Workers Day (Armenian: Ոստիկանության օր) in Armenia commemorates personnel of the Police of Armenia. It was first celebrated in 2002 and was introduced year earlier by the National Assembly of Armenia. The 2011 Law "On Police Duties" was also passed on that same day. Traditionally, the President of Armenia and/or the Prime Minister of Armenia receives the salute at a ceremony in the Yerevan police headquarters.

=== Azerbaijan ===
Celebrated on 2 July, the Azerbaijani Police Day (Azerbaijani: Azərbaycan Polisi Günü) commemorates personnel of the Police of Azerbaijan. Initially, 6 June was declared the Azerbaijani Police Day by the decree of the President of Azerbaijan, Abulfaz Elchibey, dated 6 June 1992.

On 24 May 1998, by the decree of the President Heydar Aliyev, the date of the Azerbaijan Police Day was changed to 2 July in reference to the establishment of the first police bodies within the Ministry of Internal Affairs of the Azerbaijan Democratic Republic on 2 July 1918. On the eve of the 100th anniversary of the Azerbaijani police, a march composed by Aydan Aliyeva (an employee of the BMPD) and performed by soloist of the State Musical Comedy Theater Samad Khasiyev was published.

=== Bulgaria ===
The Day of the Police of Bulgaria (Bulgarian: Ден на българската полиция) is celebrated in the country on 8 November. It commemorates the National Police Service. It was celebrated for the first time on 21 November 1924 but was interrupted after the 1944 Bulgarian coup d'état. At the suggestion of the National Police Service in 1994, 8 November was declared a national holiday once again. By decision of the Council of Ministers of Bulgaria on 29 January 1999, the Bulgarian Orthodox Church holiday of Saint Michael (archangel) was declared a professional holiday of the employees of the Ministry of Interior.

=== Canada ===
In Canada, Police and Peace Officers National Memorial Day honors of members of Canadian law enforcement on the last Sunday in September. On 24 September 1998, the Governor General of Canada Roméo LeBlanc, declared that day to be an official holiday. The country also celebrates Police Week, having been observed originally in 1970 as a catalyst for police-community relations. Annually in the province of Manitoba, February 1 is celebrated as "Royal Canadian Mounted Police Day".

=== Chile ===
Police Day in Chile is marked on two anniversary dates:

- Carabineros de Chile: April 27 (Carabineros Day)
- Day of the Investigations Police of Chile: June 19

=== China ===
In Mainland China, Chinese People's Police Festival (Chinese: 中国人民警察节) is celebrated on 10 January in honor of the People's Police of the PRC. Its date "1-10" refers to the emergency number 110 used in communities and celebrates the first 110 alarm service desk for police service in the country that established in Canton since 1986.

=== Egypt ===
National Police Day in Egypt occurs each year on 25 January. The holiday commemorates and is a remembrance for 50 police officers killed and more wounded when they refused British demands to hand over weapons and evacuate the Ismaïlia Police Station on 25 January 1952.

=== Georgia ===
In Georgia, 6 May was declared as Police Day in 2010, which coincides with St. George's day and the Day of the Adjarian Revolution. In 2011, a Police Parade was held in the city of Batumi, seeing the participation of several thousand officers. Since the ousting of President Mikheil Saakashvili, the holiday has been celebrated on 31 May.

=== Latvia ===
The Day of the Latvian State Police is celebrated on 5 December. It is founding date of the police when the newly proclaimed transitional government of, the People's Council of Latvia, approved the Temporary Regulations on the Internal Security Organization (Latvian: Pagaidu noteikumi par iekšējās apsardzības organizēšanu), created regulations for the structure of the police and its jurisdiction under the Ministry of the Interior.

=== Malaysia ===
In Malaysia, Police Day (Malay: Hari Polis) is celebrated on 25 March in honor of the first effective police force established in Penang under William Farquhar's rule since 1807, which is the predecessor of today's Royal Malaysia Police.

=== Poland ===
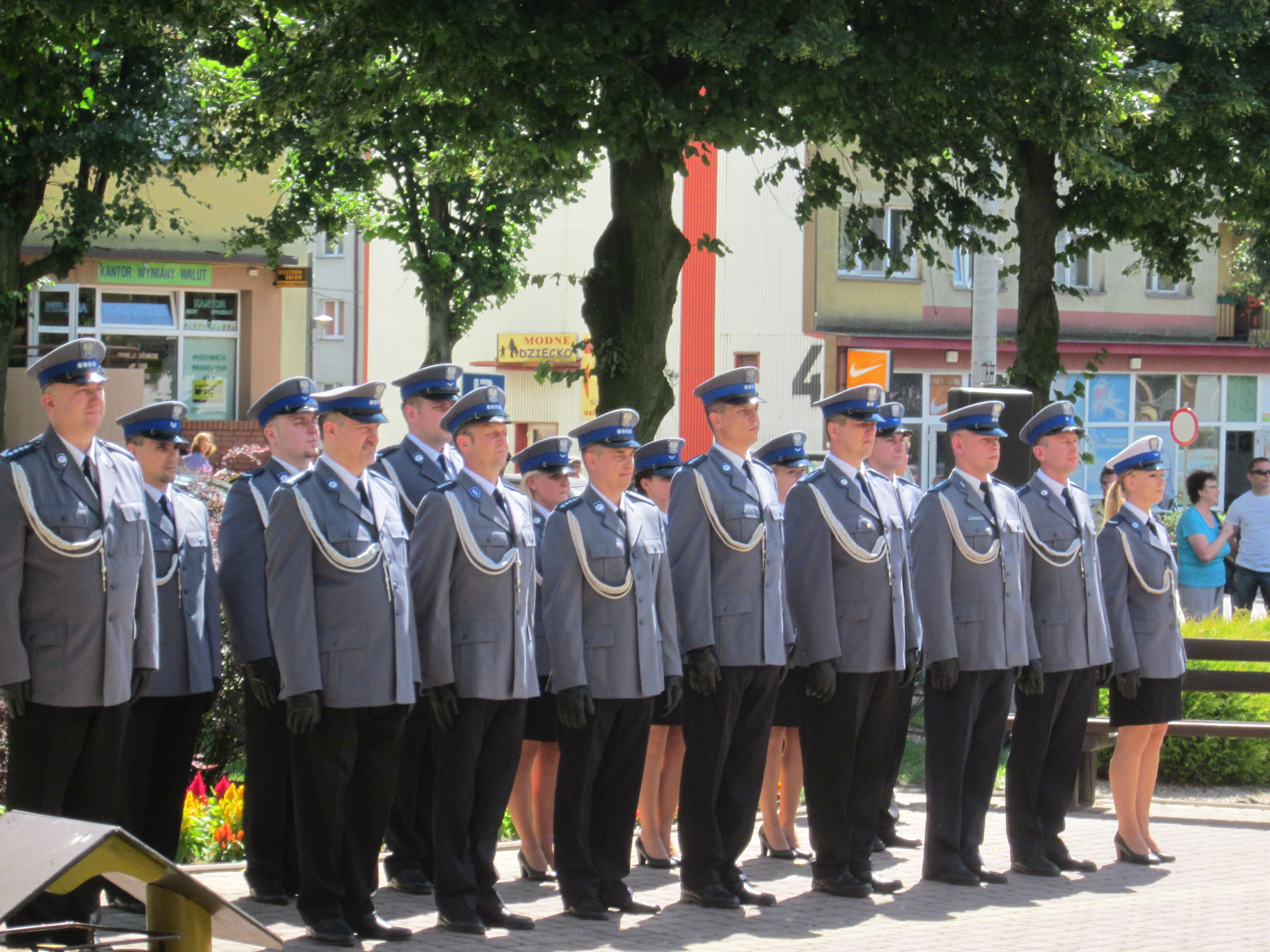
Police officers in Mońki on Police Day in 2010.

On July 24 every year, the Polish Policja celebrates its Police Day (Święto Policji) as a public holiday, having been in existence since 1995.

The timeline of previous Police Days are as follows:

- 24 July (1919-1944)
- 7 October (Day of the Milicja Obywatelska) (1944-1989)
- 6 April (1990-1995)
- 24 July (1995–Present)

As a rule, on the eve of the holiday, the Warsaw Metropolitan Police Headquarters conducts ceremony of awarding decorations to policemen. Police Day is also an opportunity to lay wreaths front of plaques and monuments dedicated to the memory of the fallen on duty. On 23 July 2010, a monument in Warsaw was unveiled in honor of police officers who were murdered in the Katyn massacre in 1940. Earlier, on 13 May 2010, the Memorial to the Memory of the Murdered Policemen was unveiled in Poznań, commemorating 395 policemen murdered by the Soviet NKVD and the German Military Administration in 1940. The 100th anniversary of the Polish Police was celebrated on Police Day with a ceremony on Piłsudski Square.

=== Romania ===
In Romania, Police Day (Romanian: Ziua Poliției) takes place on 25 March. It was introduced by the Romanian Parliament in April 2002 as a commemoration of the flag of the Romanian Police. The choice of this date is related to the symbol of the Annunciation on the first banner of the Great Ages. In 1822, Prince Grigore IV Ghica of Wallachia handed to the banner to Mihăiţă Filipescu (the head of the police at that time) the flag on which the sign of the Flag of Agia Maria is sewn.

=== Russia/Former USSR ===
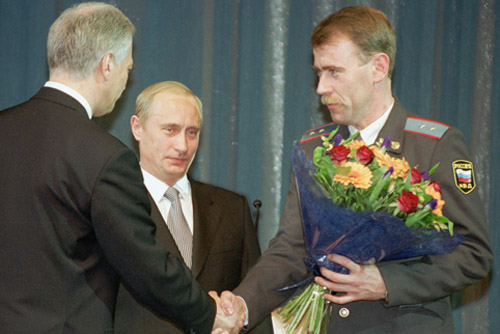
President Vladimir Putin awarding the Order of Courage on Police Day in 2001.

Police and Internal Affairs Servicemen's Day is the term to refer to the Police Day of the Russian Police (formerly the Russian Militsiya) and personnel the Russian Ministry of Internal Affairs (MVD). It was first introduced Chairman Leonid Brezhnev in 1962, and was made an official holiday in October 1980. Since 2000, the President of Russia has given the keynote address in the State Kremlin Palace in front of police officers and interior ministry officials. In many former Soviet republics, the holiday is celebrated in a similar manner to the Russians, but may however be celebrated on different days or called different things. Despite this, the most common reference to this Police Day is the Russian language translation Russian: День полиции, meaning Day of the Police or Day of the Militsiya in English. The latter was used as the name of the Russian holiday until the adoption of President Dmitry Medvedev's Russian police reform in March 2011.

=== Serbia ===
The Day of the Serbian Police and Interior Ministry (Serbian: Дан српске полиције и Министарство унутрашњих послова) is celebrated on 12 June. Also known as Serbian MUP Day, they are celebrated in the memory of the events in 1862 when the Serbian Gendarmery of the Principality of Serbia played the crucial role in the conflicts in the Čukur Fountain incident in Belgrade on June 15. Over the next two days, the Ottoman bombing of Belgrade occurred.

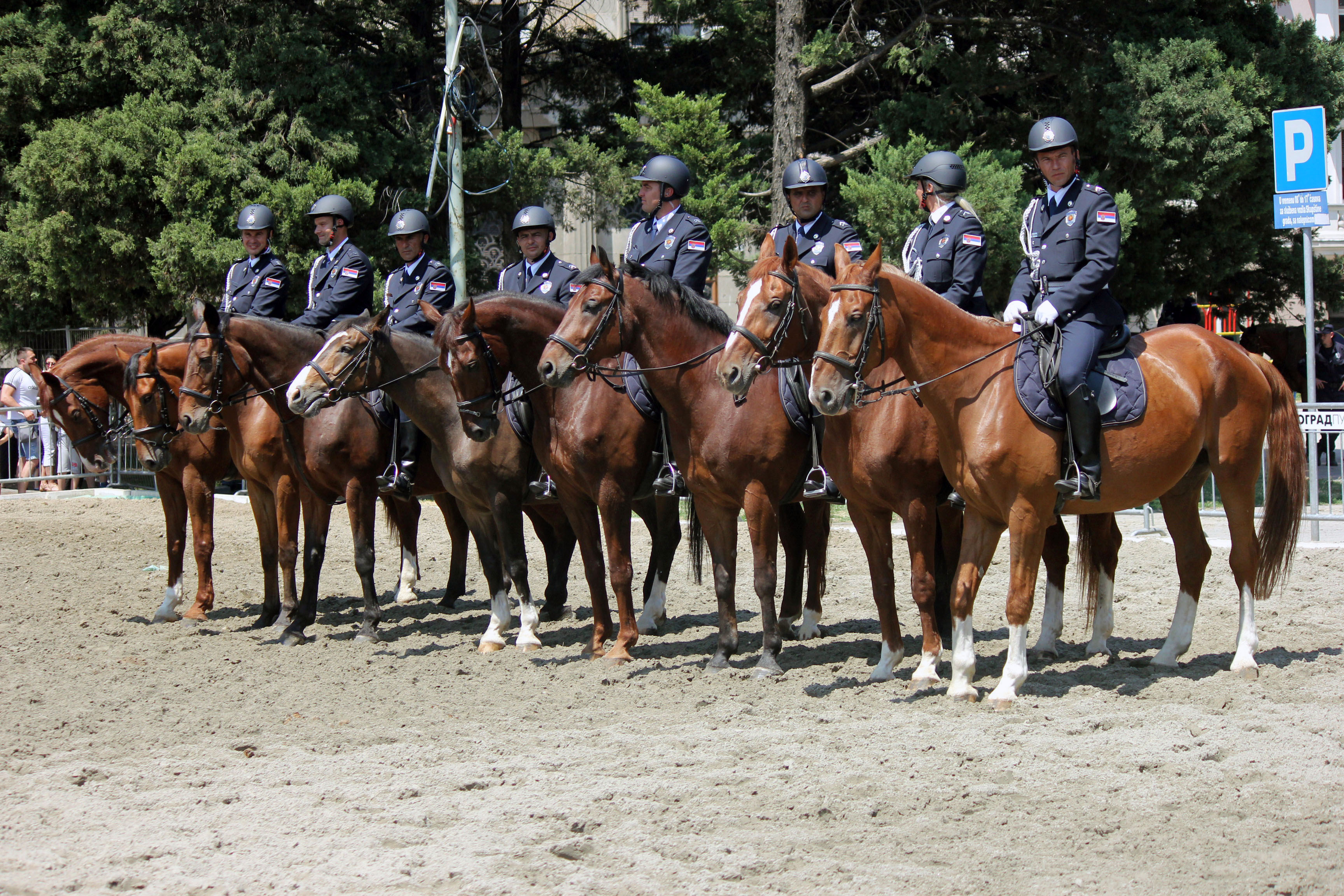
Mounted police of Belgrade police brigade on 2018 Police Day parade at Belgrade.

Policemen and women often parade before the Interior Minister and/or the President of Serbia during the holiday. The parade includes hardware, police aviation, mounted cavalry, as well as an exhibition of law enforcement strength. Wreaths are laid at the Čukur Fountain by MUP officials. Medals for diligent service are also distributed to MUP personnel.

=== Singapore ===
The Singapore Police Force celebrates its police day on June 3. It annually hosts a Police Day parade at the Home Team Academy presided by the Minister of Home Affairs and/or the President of Singapore. Various police units including the National Police Cadet Corps participate in PDP. Award presentations for categories such as the "Best Land Division" or "Best National Service Operationally Ready Unit".

=== Taiwan ===
In Taiwan, Police Day (Chinese: 警察節) is celebrated on 15 June in honor of the Police Law promulgated and implemented since 1952 based on the Constitution of the Republic of China.

=== Thailand ===
In Thailand, National Police Day (Thai: วันตำรวจ, Wan Tamruat) is celebrated on 17 October in honor of the Royal Thai Police. This was the day of the announcement of the merger of the city and provincial police forces of then Siam in 1915 the current day RTP. The first official police day ceremony was held on 13 October 1949, which continued as a practice until 1957, after which the parade ceremony was suspended On Police Day in 1952, a ceremony of police officers in front of Bhumibol Adulyadej took place at Dusit Palace Palace with a Presentation of Colours ceremony took place. In 2016, National Police Day was not celebrated on its normal date due to the passing of Rama IX that same day.

=== Ukraine ===
Ukraine celebrates National Police Day (Ukrainian: День Національної поліції) on 4 July. It commemorates the suspension of law enforcement duties by the Ukrainian Militsiya (Ukraine) and the establishment of the National Police of Ukraine. It also coincides with the first oath of patrol policemen on Sofia Square in Kyiv. The holiday was introduced and first celebrated in August 2015 and was celebrated on that day ever since until President Petro Poroshenko by decree on 4 April 2018 declared that National Police Day be celebrated annually on 4 July, and become a national holiday.

=== United Kingdom ===
The United Kingdom celebrates annually National Police Memorial Day (NPMD) in honor of its fallen policemen. It was inaugurated by Joe Holness, following the killing of Kent police officer Jon Odell, in December 2000. It is an official national day and is celebrated throughout the 4 constituent countries. The NPMD is sponsored by the British Government and the Royal Family of the United Kingdom, with Charles, Prince of Wales even becoming patron in 2006. It commemorated on 29 September, the day Odell was killed.

=== United States ===
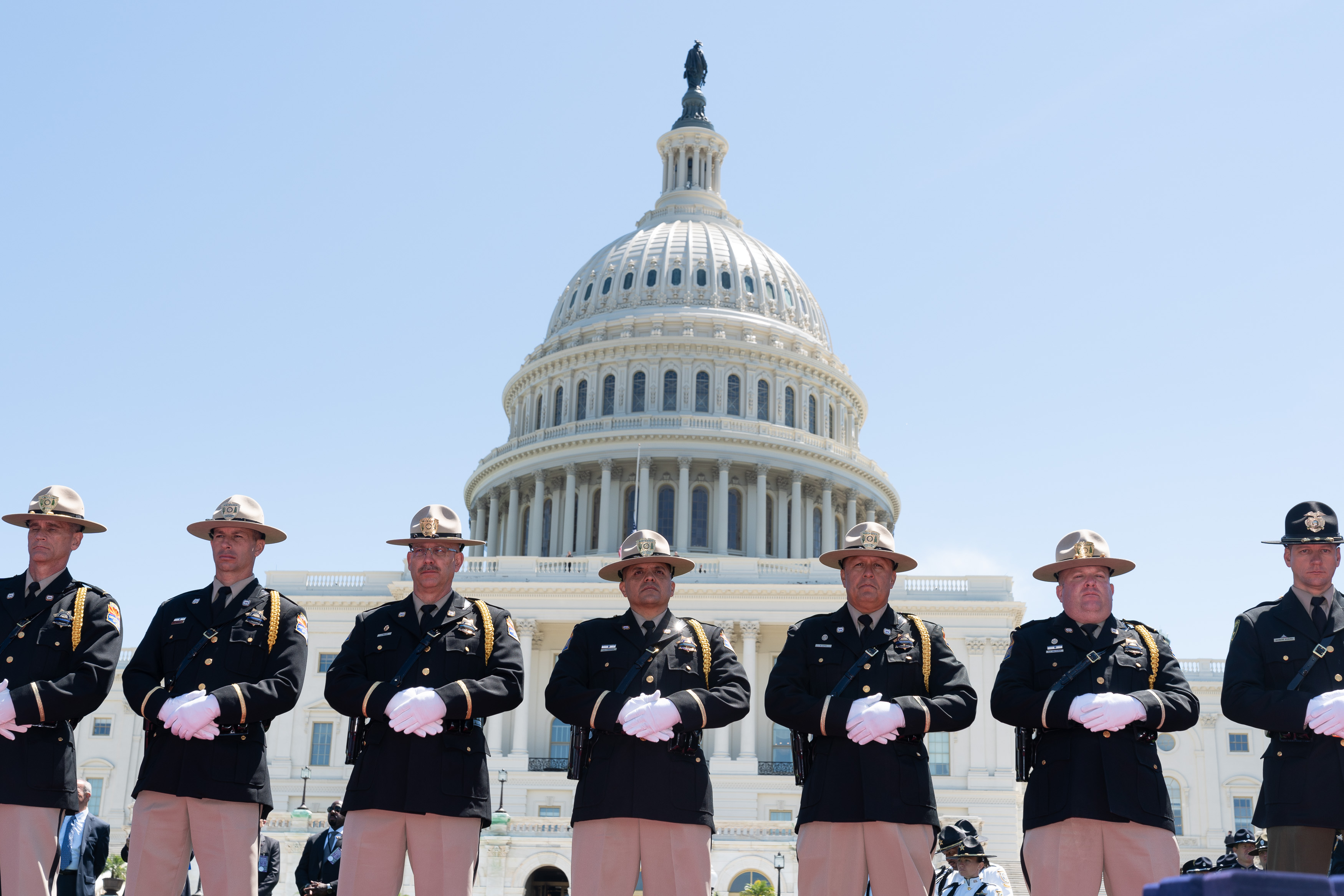
Law enforcement officers during the 38th annual National Peace Officers Memorial Service, May 2019.

Unlike most countries, the United States marks three service days to honor men and women of the federal, state, county and local city and municipal police services, the fallen of these organizations and veterans of law enforcement.

National Police Memorial Day is observed in the United States on May 15 to pay tribute to the local, state, and federal law enforcement officers who have died/or permanently disabled, in the line of duty. It also coincides with National Police Week, which is the calendar week in which the memorial falls. The event is sponsored by the National Fraternal Order of Police (FOP) and includes an annual Blue Mass, a drill competition, a Wreath Laying Ceremony and a National Police Survivors Conference. The holiday was first celebrated in 1962 and is de facto the official Police Day of the United States.

On January 9, citizens help commemorate National Law Enforcement Appreciation Day. October 28 is marked as National First Responders Day, which celebrates all members of the federal level and regional police, as well as firefighters, paramedics, and emergency dispatchers. The United States Senate designated National First Responders Day in 2017, being introduced by Senators Elizabeth Warren and Tom Cotton, as well as Representatives Mark Meadows, Michael Capuano and Elijah Cummings.

While May 15 is marked as a national working holiday, the day is also marked as the general celebration day for all federal, state, county, city and municipal police forces. These police forces still mark their respective foundation days, while sharing in the national celebration.

The federal law enforcement services also mark their individual anniversaries:

- U.S. Immigration and Customs Enforcement Formation Day (March 1)
- United States Capitol Police Day (May 2)
- United States Border Patrol Day (May 28)
- Drug Enforcement Administration Day and Bureau of Alcohol, Tobacco, Firearms and Explosives Formation Anniversary (July 1)
- Federal Bureau of Investigation Day (July 26)
- United States Postal Inspection Service Day (August 7)
- United States Marshals Service Day (September 14)
- Transportation Security Administration Day (November 19)
- United States Park Police Day (December 14)

State and local

- Florida Law Enforcement Appreciation Day, May 1 of each year
- Miami-Dade County Law Enforcement Appreciation Day, 12 May 2023, on the Friday before National Police Week, a holiday for county employees

Among the overseas territories, the following also celebrate their anniversaries:

- Puerto Rico Police Day (February 21)

=== Vietnam ===
Vietnam celebrates National Police Day on 19 August. It commemorates the foundation of Vietnam People's Public Security, the national law enforcement force of Vietnam, in 1945 and also commemorates the August Revolution of the same date.

== See also ==
- Navy Day
- Armed Forces Day
