= Petar Ubavkić =

Serbian painter (1852–1910)

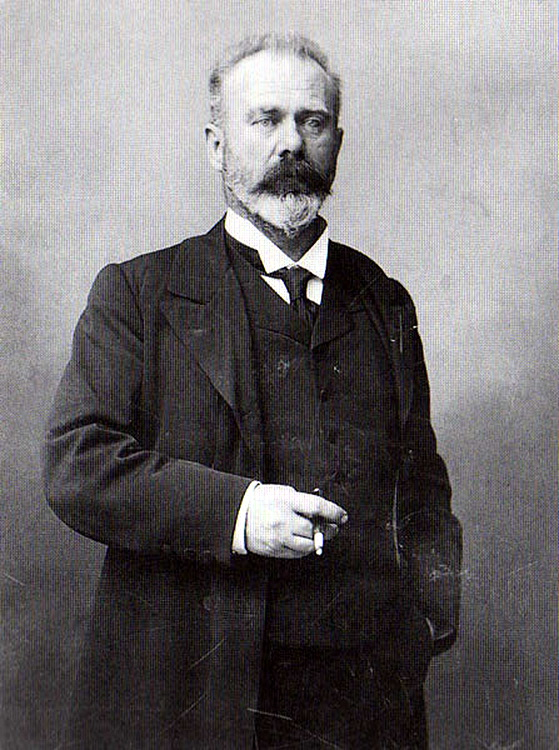
- Born: 12 April 1852; Belgrade, Principality of Serbia
- Died: 28 June 1910 (aged 58); Belgrade, Kingdom of Serbia
- Education: Vienna, Munich
- Known for: Sculpture

Peter Ubavkić (12 April 1852 – 28 June 1910) was a Serbian sculptor and painter, recognized as the premier sculptor of Serbia, given the task to create a series of national monuments of which he authored many. He was a member of the Serbian Academy of Sciences and Arts.

== Biography ==
He was born in Belgrade on 12 April 1852. After completing high school (gymnasium), he received a state scholarship, and in 1866 he also studied iconography with an itinerant Italian artist, then living in Belgrade. He pursued his studies in art in Pančevo. In 1873 he went to Vienna to study sculpture. Owing to poor health, he returned to Belgrade. Upon receiving a new state scholarship he resumed his studies at the prestigious Kunstgewerbeschule in Munich in 1874.

According to some, he is considered one of the originators of 19th-century Serbian sculpture along with neo-classicist Dimitrije Petrović (1799-1852). He has made numerous public monuments, among his best known works are busts of Vuk Karadžić, Prince Miloš and Đura Daničić.

Petar Ubavkić died in Belgrade on Vidovdan, 28 June 1910 and was buried in the New Cemetery.

== Legacy ==
Today, Ubavkić is considered the premier Serbian sculptor in an age when art flourished to its maximum. He was indeed the creator of many public monuments at the time of the rule of Prince Miloš Obrenović. Among his most important artistic works realized according to the cannons of realism or even verism, are the many Belgrade monuments executed by Ubavkić, including some in other regions of Serbia, particularly the monument to King Milan Obrenović in the Church of St. Paraskeve in Ćurlina.

== Gallery ==
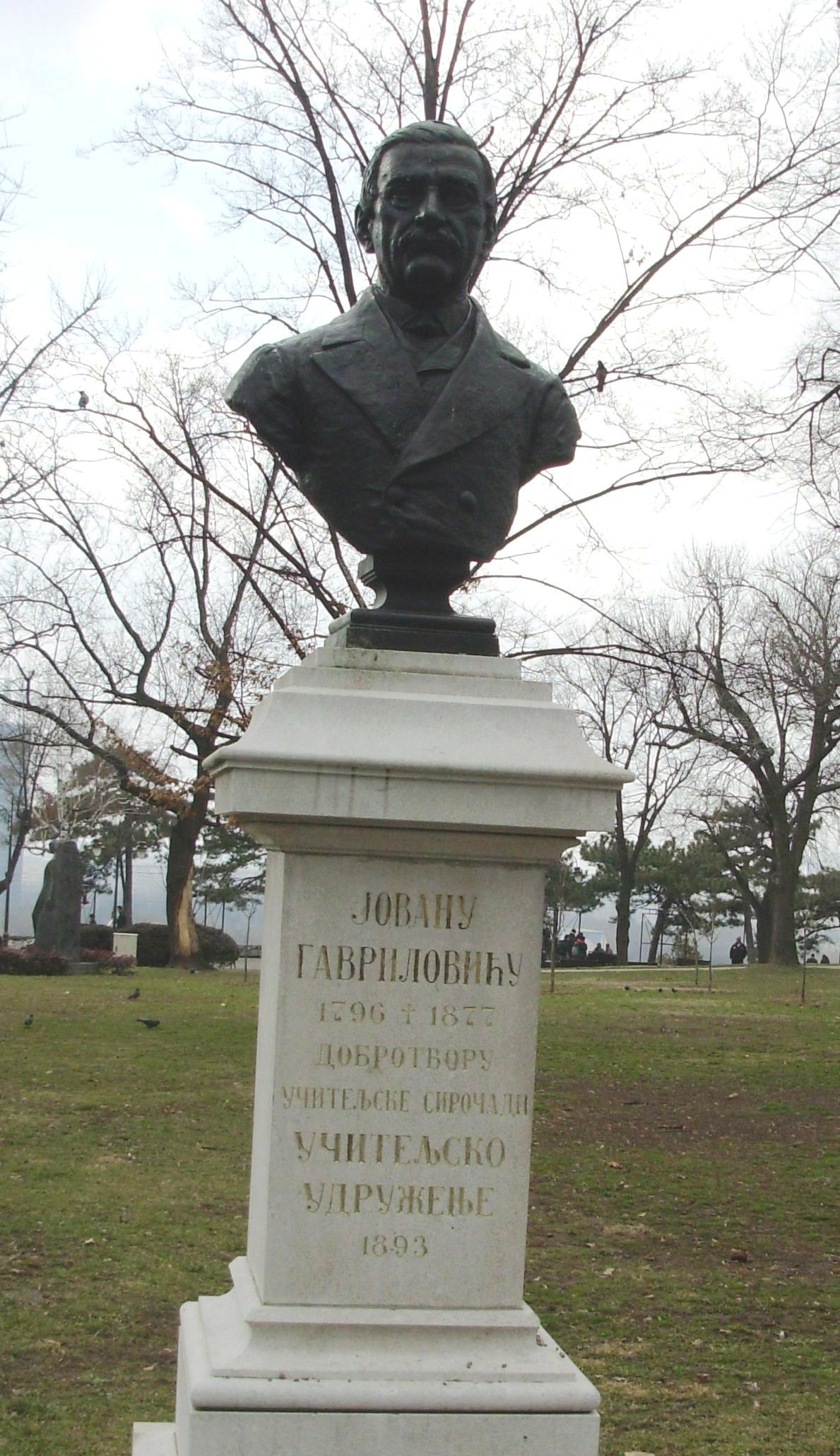
Bust of Jovan Gavrilović, 1893

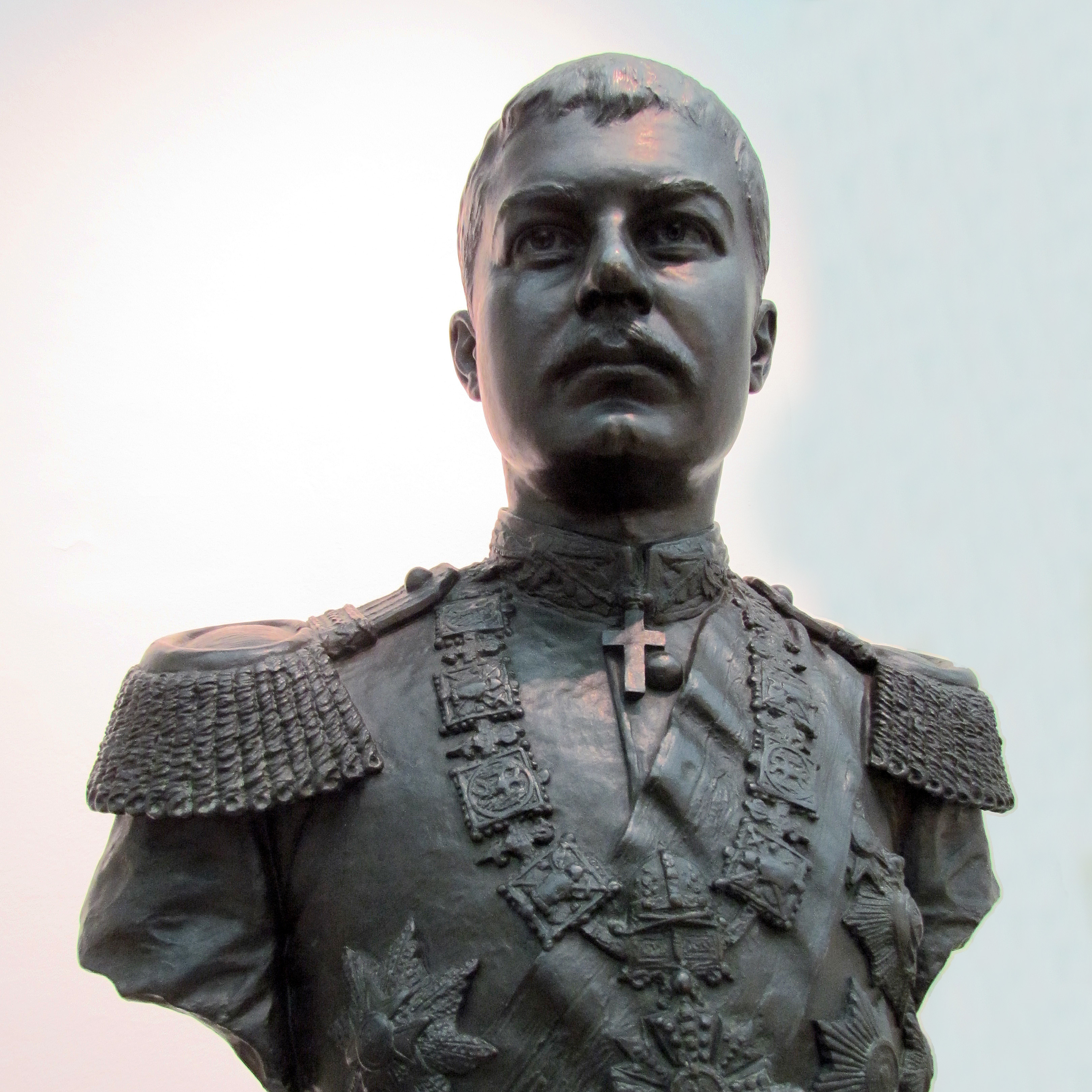
Bust of Alexander I of Serbia, 1895

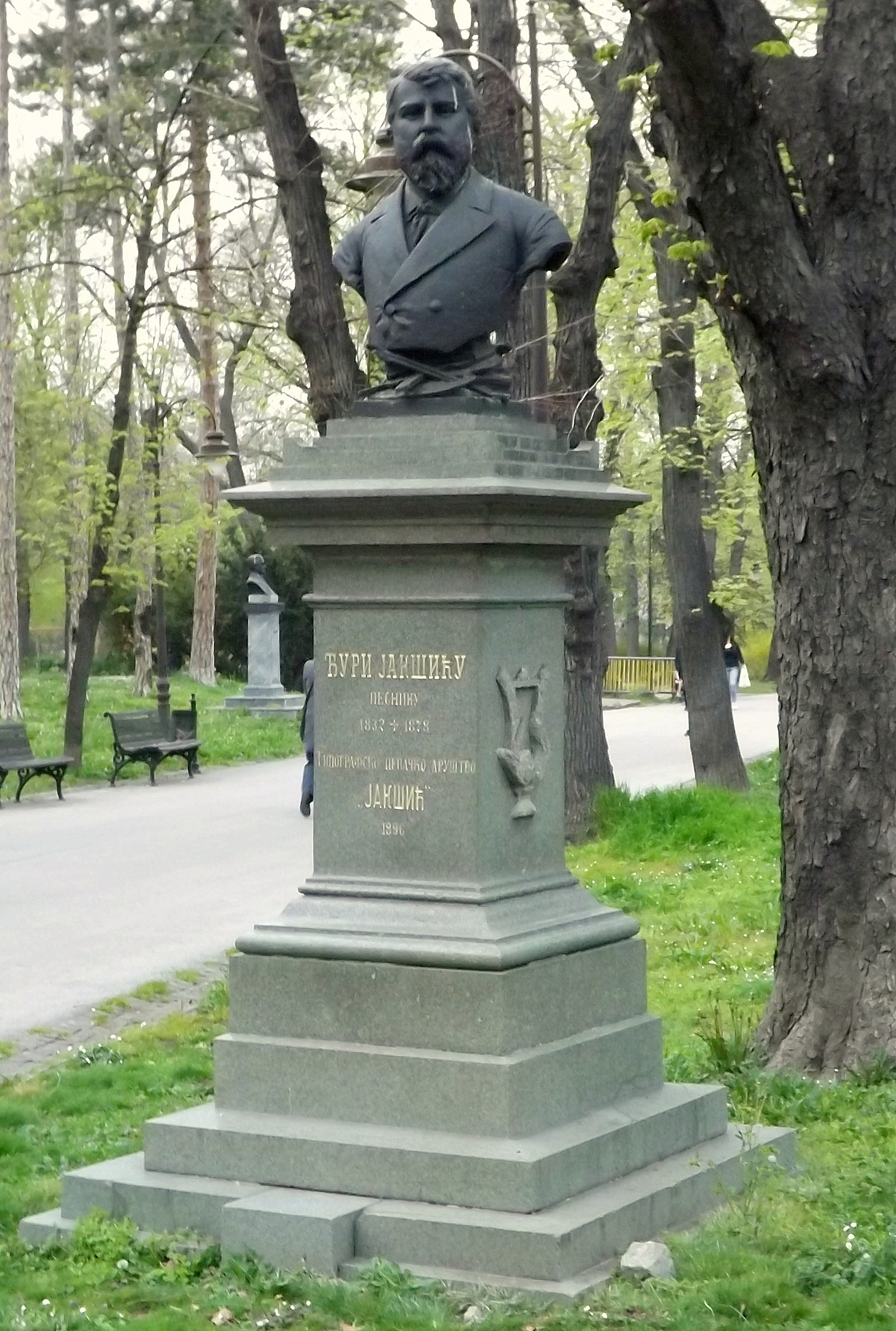
Bust of Đura Jakšić, 1896

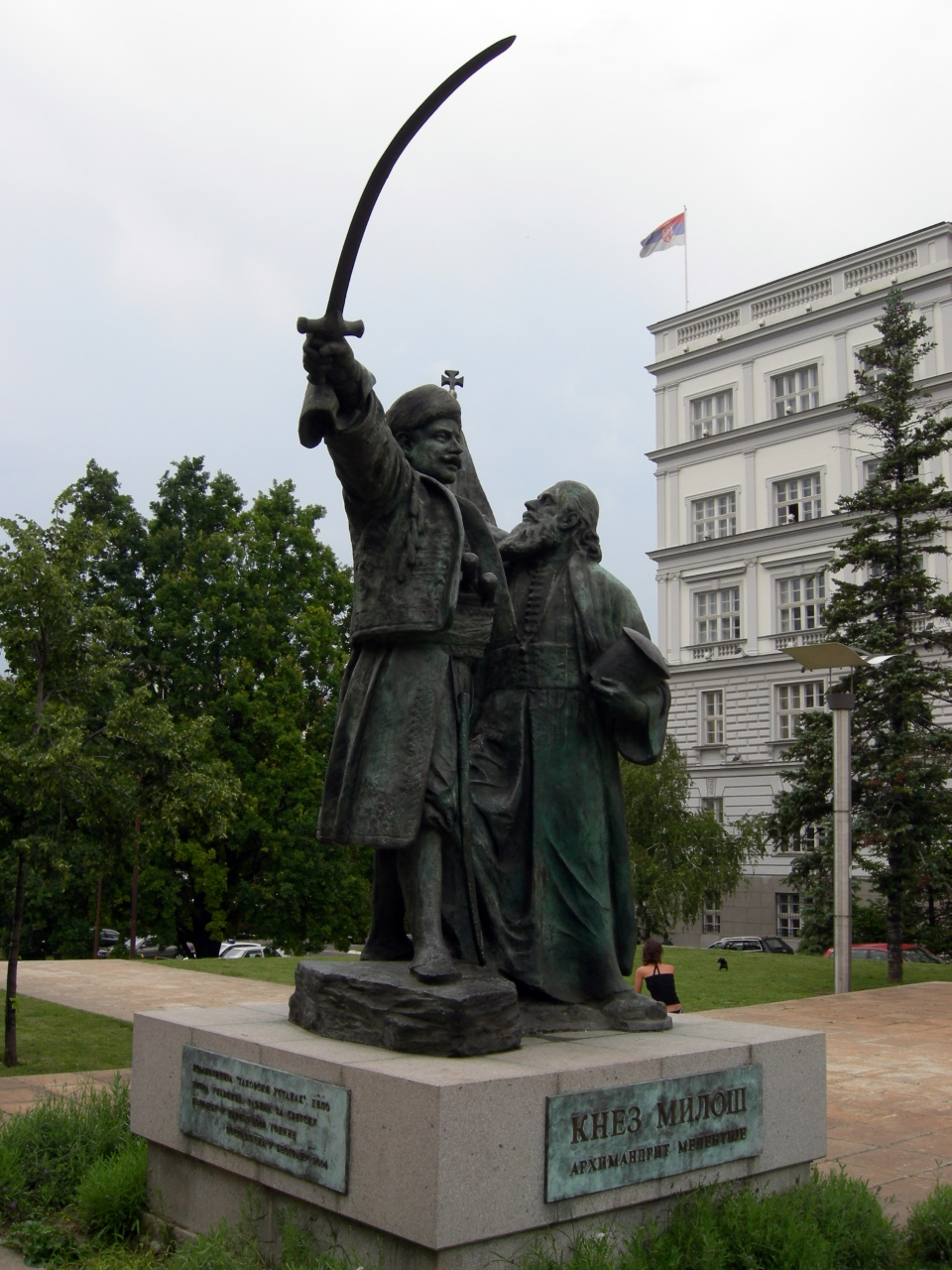
Takovo uprising, 1900

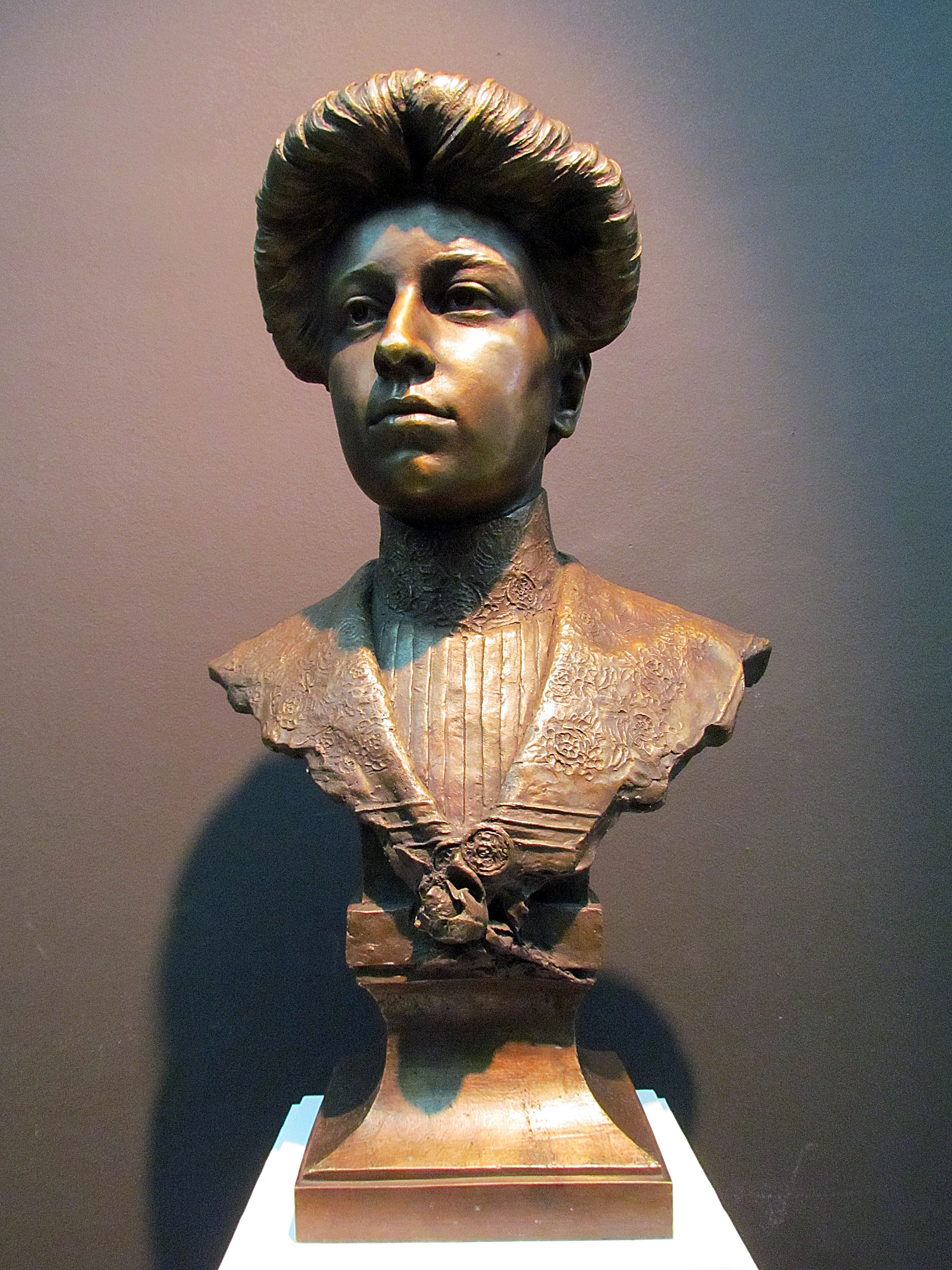
Bust of Branislava Simić, 1904

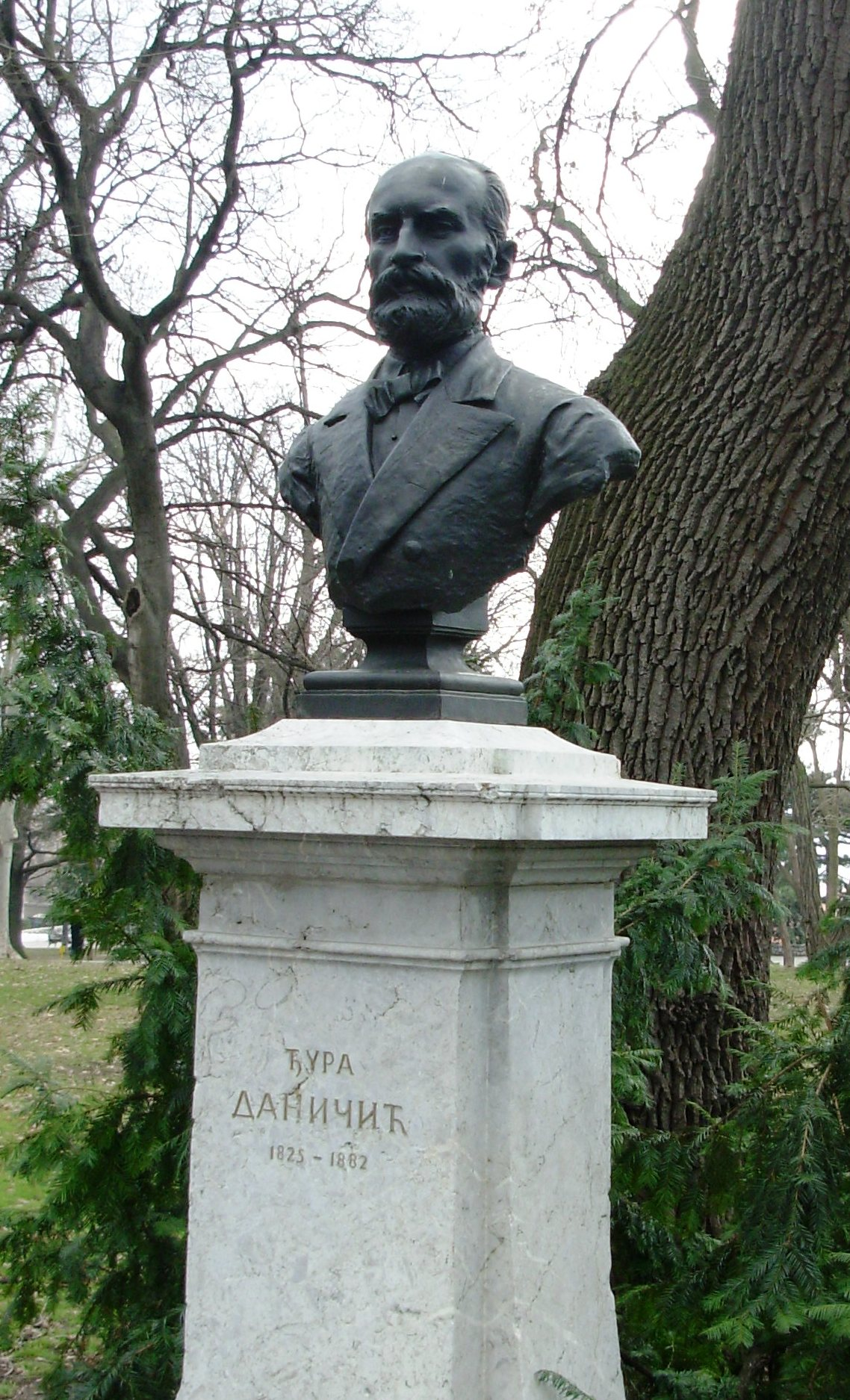
Bust of Đura Daničić

== See also ==
- Đorđe Jovanović
- Simeon Roksandić
- Risto Stijović
- Sreten Stojanović
