= Ljubisa D.R. Kocinac =

Ljubisa Dragi Rosanda Kocinac (born in Serbia in January 1947) is a mathematician and currently a Professor Emeritus at the University of Niš, Serbia.

== Biography ==
He completed his PhD, focused on cardinal functions, at the University of Belgrade in 1983, under the supervision of Đuro Kurepa. Kocinac has published over 160 papers and four books in topology, real analysis and fields of sets.

He has actively promoted research on selection principles, as a fruitful collaborator and as an organizer of the first conferences in a series of international workshops titled Coverings, Selections and Games in Topology. The fourth of this series, held in Caserta, Italy, in June 2012 was dedicated to him on the occasion of his sixty-fifth birthday.

His research interests include aspects of topology, especially selection principles, topological games and coverings of topological spaces, and mathematical analysis. In particular, he introduced star selection principles. He is also known for his wit. When asked "Would you like some wine?", Kočinac replied "Only if you insist. (Pause) Please insist.".
