= Milan Kurepa =

Serbian atomic physicist (1933–2000)

Milan V. Kurepa
- Born: 11 May 1933; Bačka Palanka, Kingdom of Yugoslavia
- Died: 16 October 2000 (aged 67); Belgrade, Serbia, FR Yugoslavia
- Education: University of Belgrade
- Scientific career
- Fields: Atomic physics
- Workplaces: University of Belgrade
- Doctoral advisor: Aleksandar Milojević

Milan V. Kurepa (11 May 1933 – 16 October 2000) was a renowned Serbian atomic physicist.

== Biography ==
Kurepa was born on 1 May 1933 in town of Bačka Palanka, Vojvodina, Serbia. In 1956, he began his working at the Vinca Nuclear Institute in Belgrade. Kurepa graduated from the University of Belgrade Faculty of Mathematics under Aleksandar Milojević, and later electrical engineering in the United Kingdom, under J. D. Craggs. His thesis topic was slow electron scattering off atoms and molecules.

Kurepa then joined the University of Belgrade physics department as an assistant professor. He became a professor in 1981 and continued in that position until his retirement in 1998. Kurepa often worked at Universities abroad, including Germany and the UK. Kurepa's pedagogical work at the undergraduate and graduate levels was highly valued. He was a coauthor of 12 university and 4 high-school textbooks.

In 1964, Kurepa joined the newly founded Institute of Physics at the University of Belgrade as a research scientist. There, he started the Atomic Physics Laboratory. Due primarily to Kurepa's leadership, the Atomic Physics Laboratory gained an international reputation in the field of electron collisions with atoms or molecules. At present, about a dozen of Kurepa's students are scientists and professors at leading universities in Australia, Belgium, the UK, France, Germany, Slovenia, Sweden, and the United States.

He was an outstanding organizer, coordinating numerous domestic and international conferences. He served as president of many Yugoslavian academic institutions.

In 1994, Kurepa was elected the corresponding member of the Serbian Academy of Sciences and Arts. During the isolation of Yugoslavian scientists from the rest of the world due to United Nations sanctions, Kurepa organized a very successful meeting of SANU in 1997 to celebrate the 100th anniversary of the discovery of the electron.

Kurepa fought for democracy in Yugoslavia. A vigorous adversary of Slobodan Milosevic's regime, Kurepa founded in 1997 the Association of University Professors and Scientists, with the principal aim of fighting for the recovery of basic university freedoms in Serbia. He was AUPR's first president. The association has been especially active since 1998, when the University Act was introduced to abolish the autonomy of Serbian universities. AUPR has organized protest meetings at Serbian universities, published statements regarding university autonomy and freedom of opinion, appealed to international academic associations for intervention with the Serbian government, and engaged in similar activities.

During the 2000 electoral campaign, Kurepa traveled around Serbia with the students' movement Otpor!. Otpor awarded him a certificate, acknowledging him as "the most resistive professor."

== Other ==
He was part of the Kurepa family : the mathematicians Svetozar Kurepa and Djuro Kurepa were respectively his cousin and his uncle.
