= Majske Poljane =

- Village
- Location of Majske Poljane in Croatia
- Coordinates: 45°21′N 16°09′E
- Country: Croatia
- Region: Central Croatia (Banovina)
- County: Sisak-Moslavina
- Municipality: Glina

Area
  - Total: 15.1 km^{2} (5.8 sq mi)
- Elevation: 117 m (384 ft)

Population (2021)
  - Total: 143
  - Density: 9.47/km^{2} (24.5/sq mi)
- Time zone: UTC+1 (CET)
  - Summer (DST): UTC+2 (CEST)
- Postal code: 44400 Glina
- Area code: (+385) 44

Majske Poljane is a village in central Croatia, in the municipality/town of Glina, Sisak-Moslavina County. The village's geographic coordinates are 45°21′N 16°8′E, the altitude is 162 meters above sea level. The village was severely affected by the 2020 Petrinja earthquake, with five deaths reported.

== Culture ==
The village is within the Serbian Orthodox Church's Eparchy of Upper Karlovac. The Orthodox parish church, dedicated to the Resurrection of Christ, stands on the hill above the village. The one-nave building with a semicircular chapel, high wooden cassette ceilings, vault decorated with figural and plant motifs, and the wooden bell tower, was built no later than 1820. It is very likely that its predecessor, the older wooden church, stood close by and higher up the hill. While the "new church" is a one-room Krajina type of church, it is very traditional in shape and construction of the ceiling and vaults, and is similar to the chapel in Gornje Selište near Glina. The church, a pearl of folk architecture, was damaged by an earthquake of 1909 and its iconostasis, inherited from the Glina's St. George's Church, was destroyed during World War II. The extensive reconstruction and renovation work carried out on the church, which started in 1946, was only completed in 1989. The church is of great historical and architectural value.

== Demographics ==
According to the 2011 census, the village of Majske Poljane has 196 inhabitants. This represents 32.56% of its pre-war population according to the 1991 census.

Population by ethnicity

Year of census	total	Serbs	Croats	Yugoslavs	others
2011	196	139 (70.92%)	53 (27.04%)	-	4 (2.04%)
2001	325	n/a	n/a	-	n/a
1991	602	576 (95.68%)	6 (1.00%)	10 (1.66%)	10 (1.66%)
1981	658	609 (92.55%)	8 (1.26%)	35 (5.32%)	6 (0.87%)
1971	806	791 (98.14%)	8 (0.99%)	5 (0.62%)	2 (0.25%)
1961	883	875 (99.09%)	4 (0.45%)	2 (0.23%)	2 (0.23%)

Historical population 1857-2011
v

population	746	852	825	1033	1157	1315	1121	1378	927	915	883	806	658	602	325	196
	1857	1869	1880	1890	1900	1910	1921	1931	1948	1953	1961	1971	1981	1991	2001	2011

Sources: Croatian Bureau of Statistics publications

== Sights and events ==
- Celebration of the Feast of Transfiguration on 19 August
- Monument to the Victims of Fascism - removed from the site and deposited into storage facilities in Glina based on the decision of the Glina Municipal Council dated 18 March 1997

== Notable natives and residents ==
- Đuro Kurepa (1907–1993), Yugoslav mathematician.
- Svetozar Kurepa (1929–2010), Yugoslavian and Croatian mathematician whose main contributions were in the areas of functional analysis and operator theory.
- Simeon Roksandić (1874–1943), a distinguished Serbian sculptor and academic, was also born in Majske Poljane.
