= Simeon Roksandić =

Serbian sculptor (1874–1943)

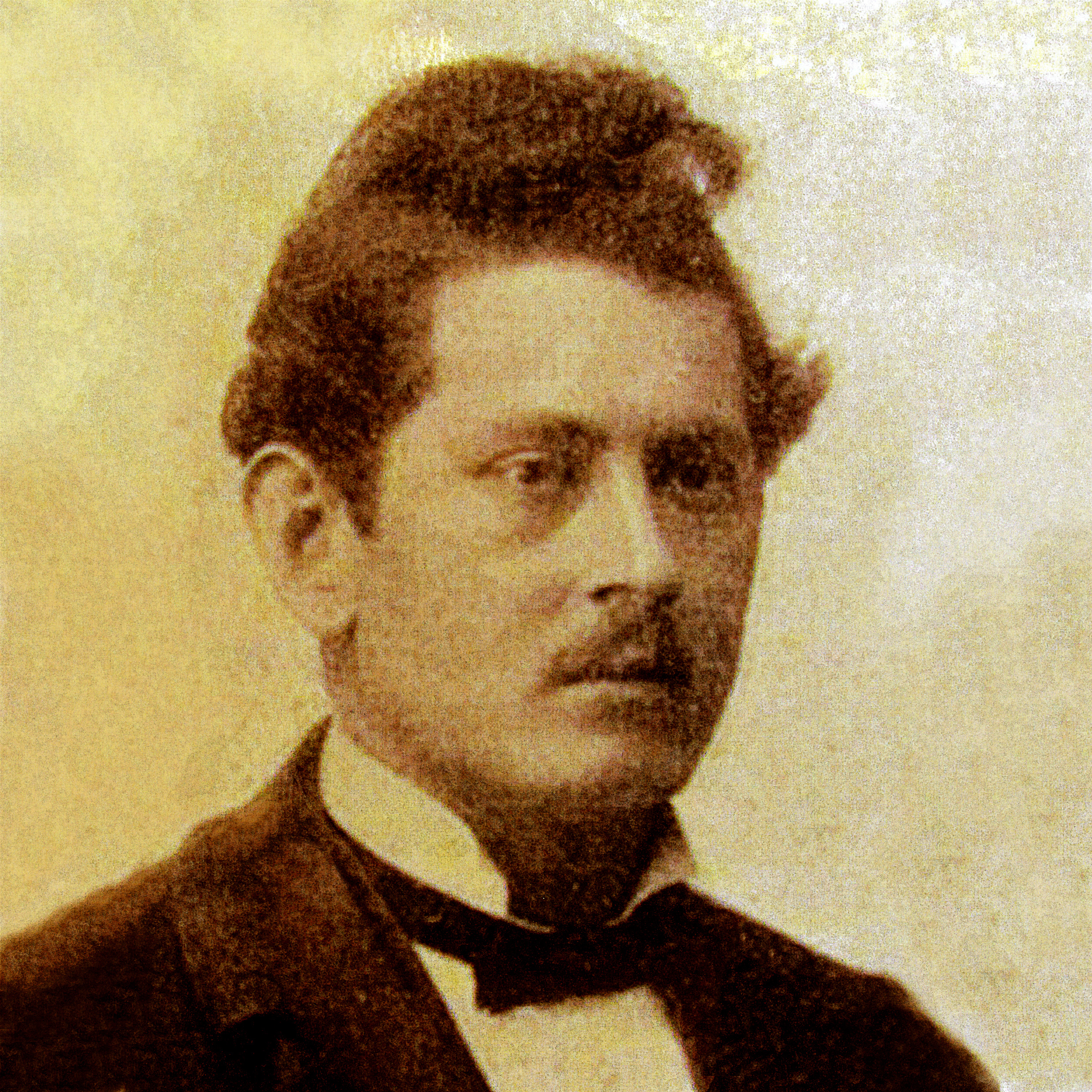
- Born: 14 May 1874; Majske Poljane, Austria-Hungary
- Died: 12 January 1943 (aged 68); Belgrade, German-occupied Serbia
- Occupation: sculptor

Simeon Roksandić (14 May 1874 – 12 January 1943) was a Serbian sculptor and academic, famous for his bronzes and fountains. He is frequently cited as one of the most renowned figures in Serbian and Yugoslavian sculpture.

== Life and work ==
Roksandić was born in the village of Majske Poljane and schooled in Glina and Zagreb. After discovering an interest in sculpture, he obtained a stipend for studies in Budapest. In 1895, he continued his education in Munich, where he met Djordje Krstić, who encouraged him to move to Belgrade. Since 1898, Roksandić lived and worked in Serbia for most of his life.

In 1904, he was one of the founders of the Association of Serbian Artists LADA, alongside Beta Vukanović, Marko Murat, Đorđe Jovanović, Uroš Predić, and others. Roksandić exhibited his artworks as a part of Kingdom of Serbia's pavilion at International Exhibition of Art of 1911.

He sculptured the "Unfortunate Fisherman" fountains in Kalemegdan Park in Belgrade, Serbia and in Jezuitski Square, Zagreb, Croatia.

His prominent works include:

- Boy with a Thorn (1922) at the National Museum of Serbia
- Boy with a Broken Jug (erected in 1931) at Čukur Fountain
- Self portrait (erected in 1965) at Belgrade Fortress

== Gallery ==
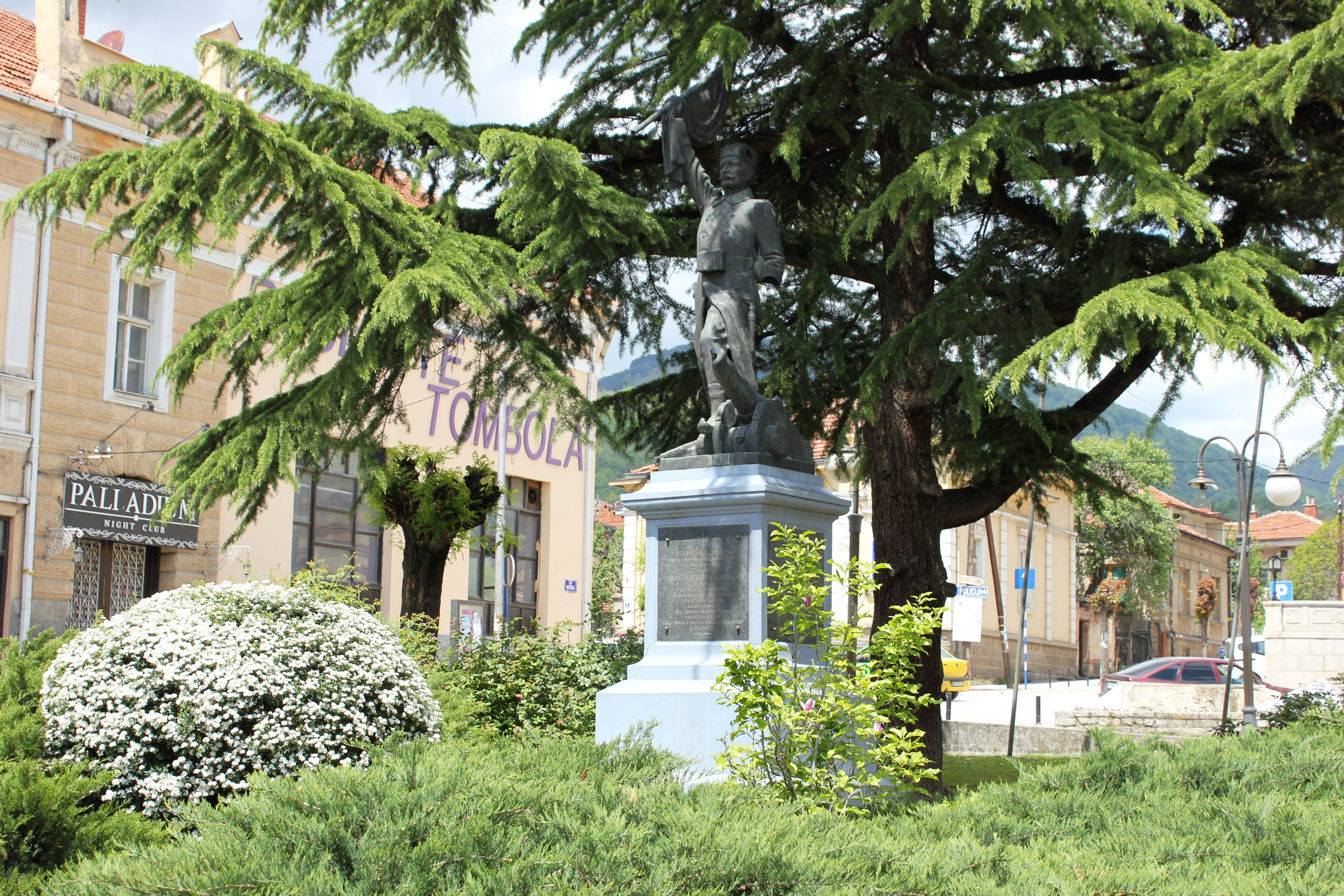
The Monument to the Liberators of Vranje (1903) commemorating Liberation of Vranje. It was damaged twice, by Bulgarian occupiers in WWI and WWII. It was left damaged on purpose.

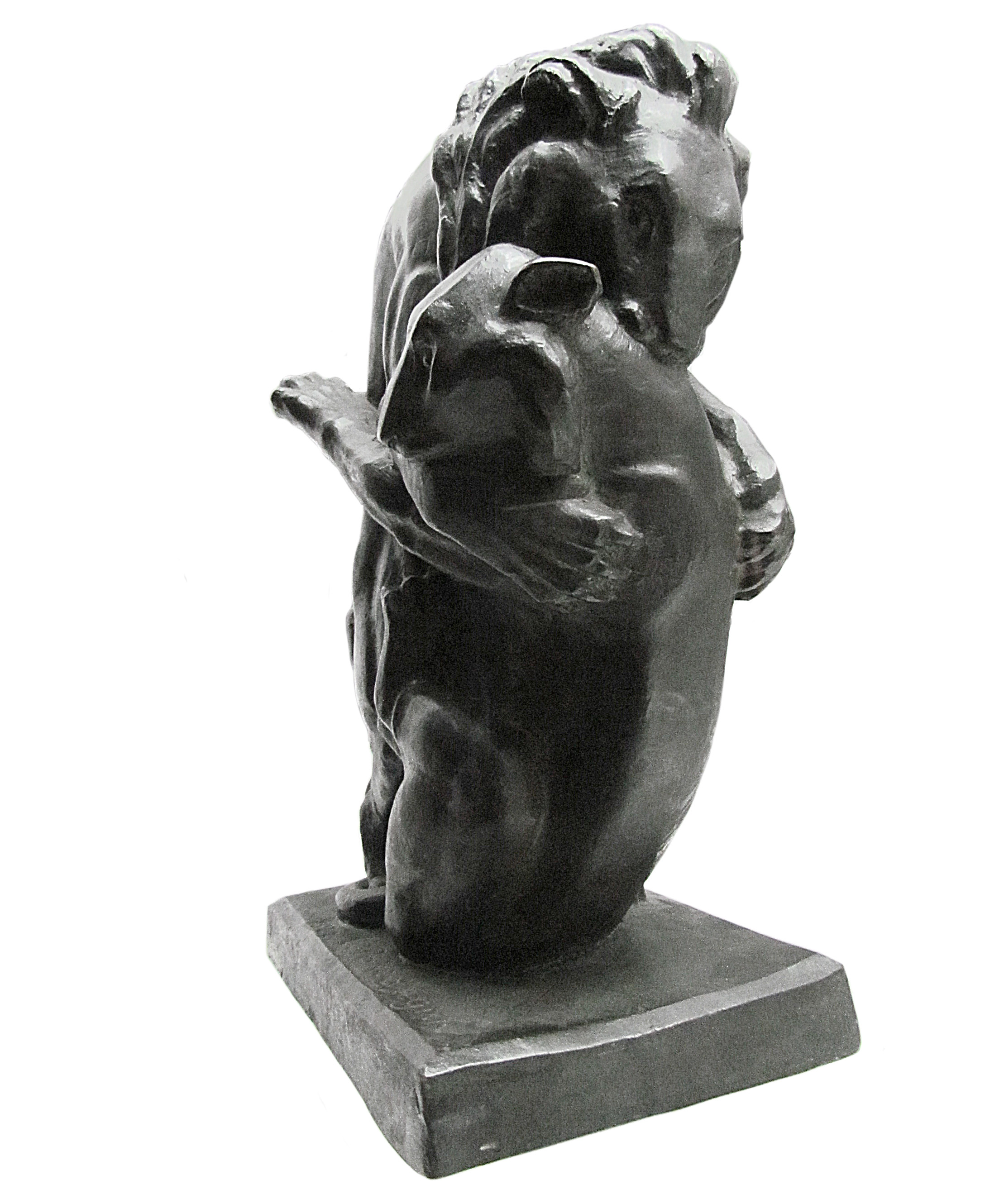
Lion struggling a tiger, 1917

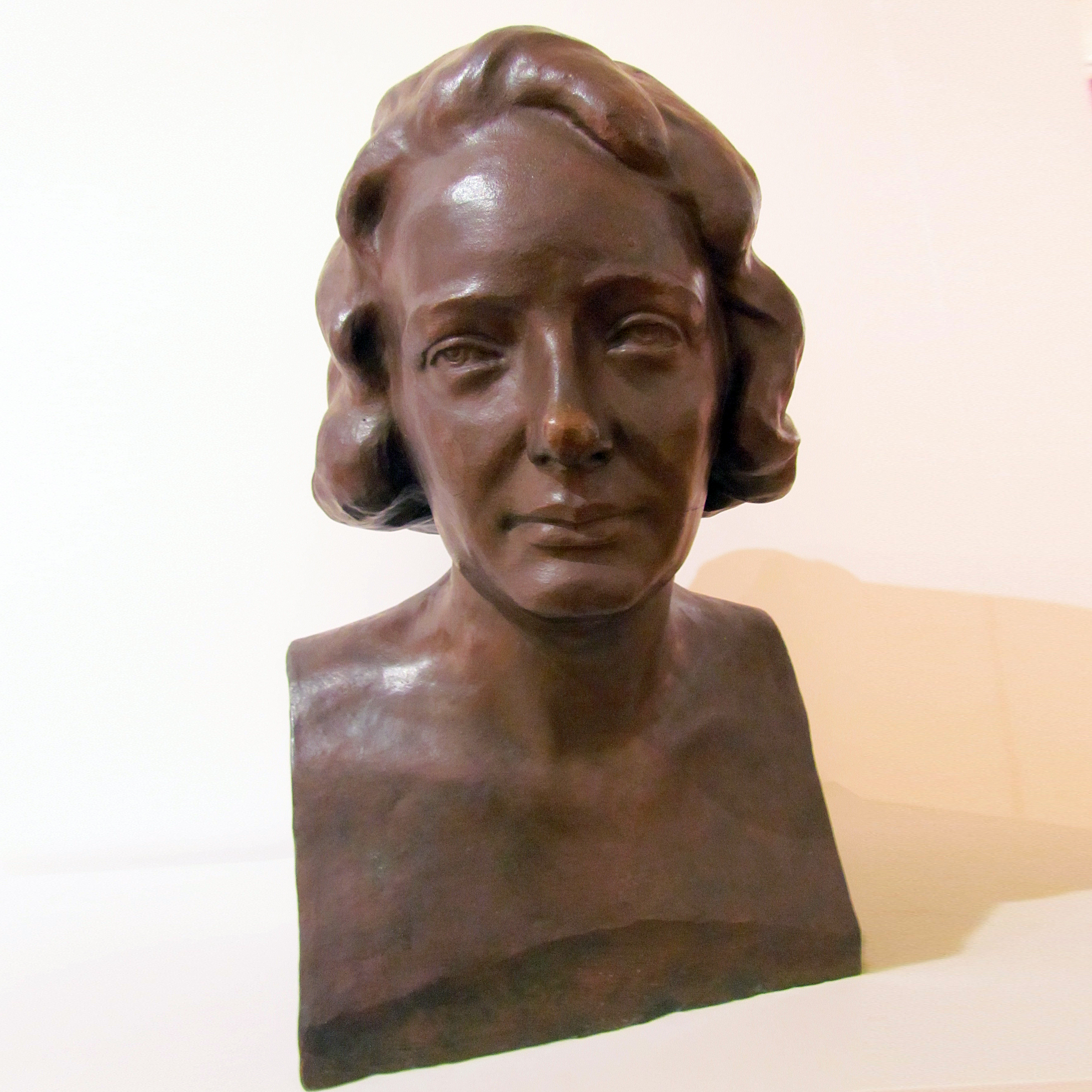
Portrait of the Sculptor's Sister-in-Law, 1921

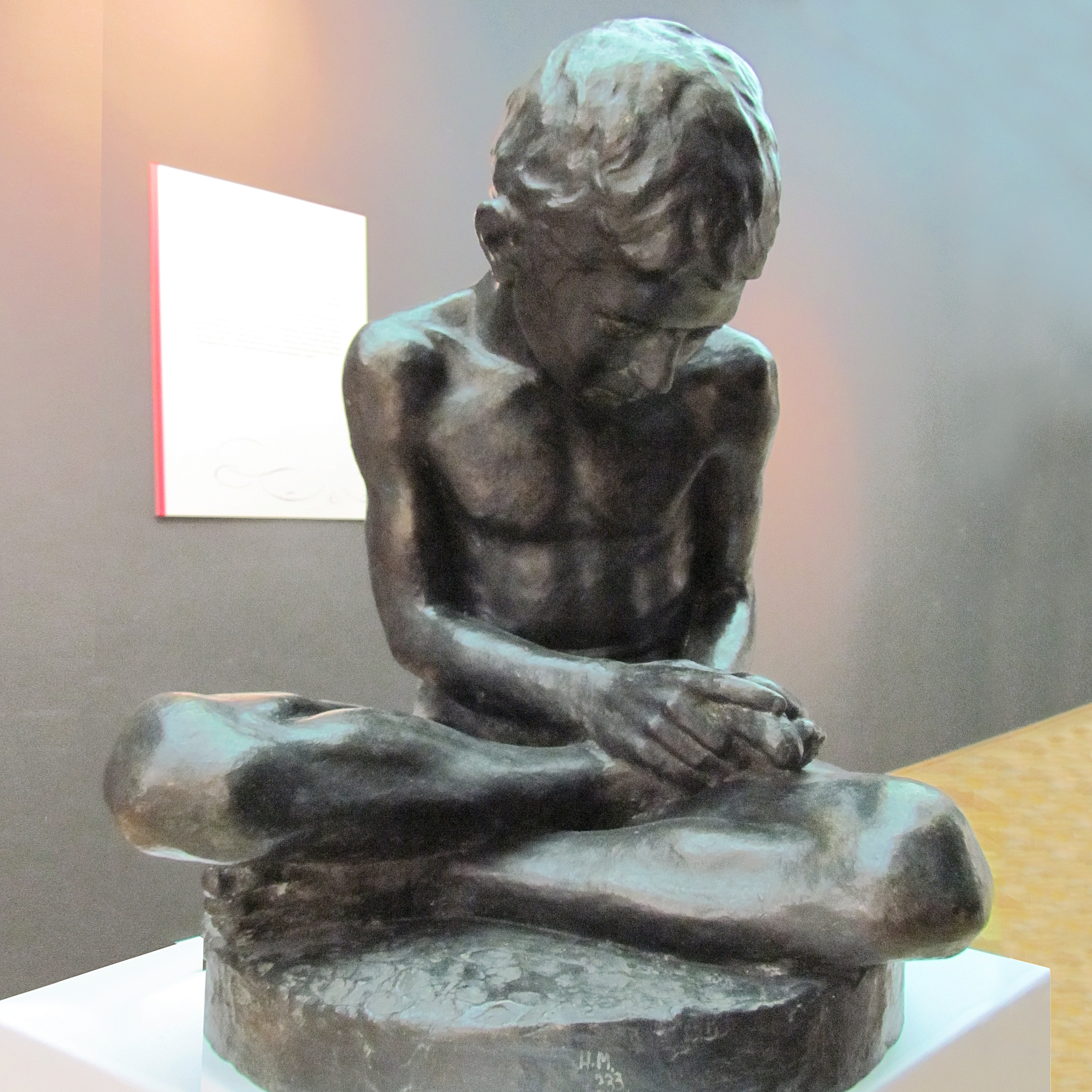
Boy with a Thorn (1922) at the National Museum of Serbia

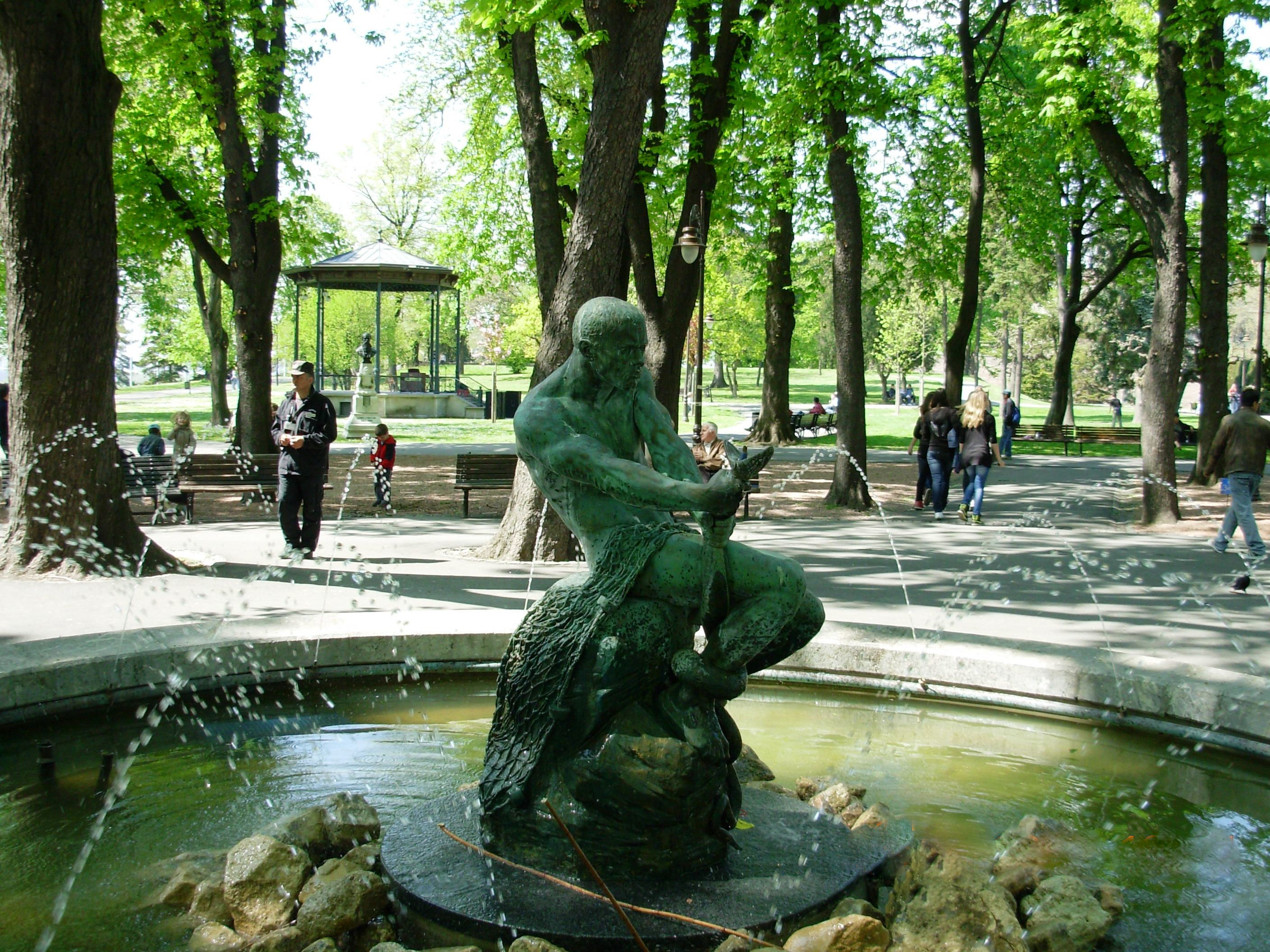
Unhappy Fisherman fountain, 1926

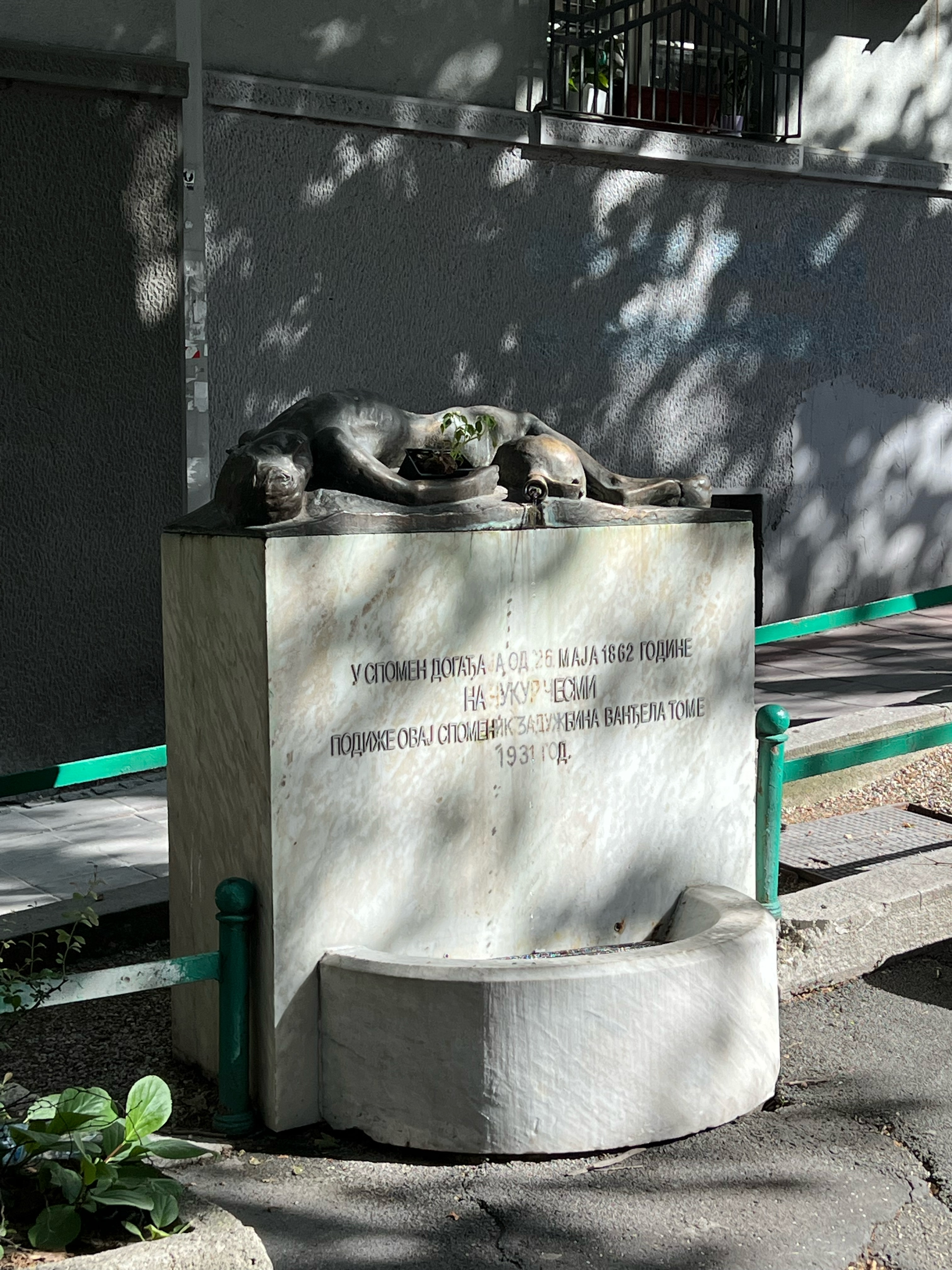
Boy with a Broken Jug at Čukur Fountain, erected in 1931

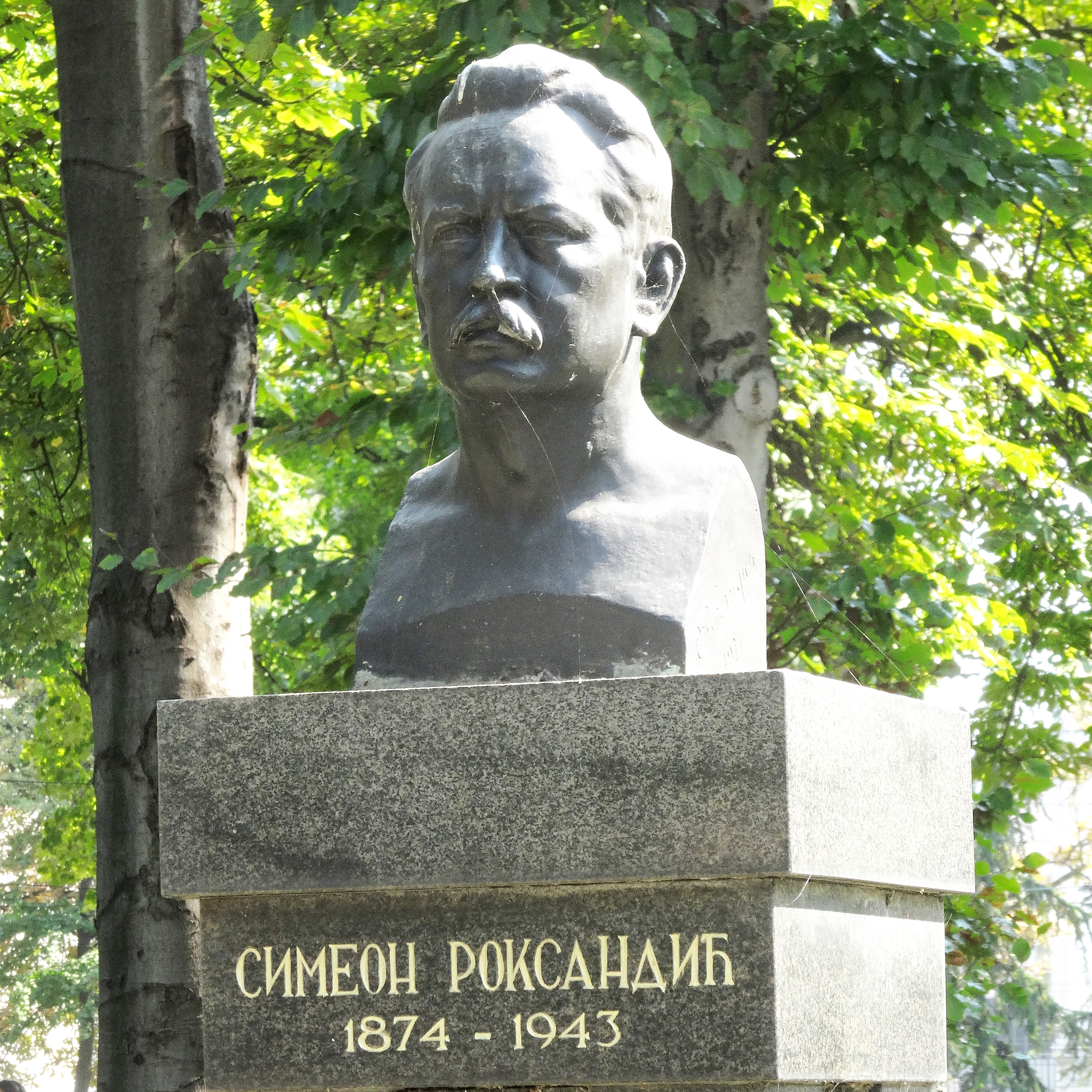
Self Portrait (erected in 1965) at Belgrade Fortress

== See also ==
- Petar Ubavkić
- Đorđe Jovanović
- Risto Stijović
- Sreten Stojanović
