= Čukur Fountain =

Serbian monument

Coordinates: 44.8193°N 20.4625°E

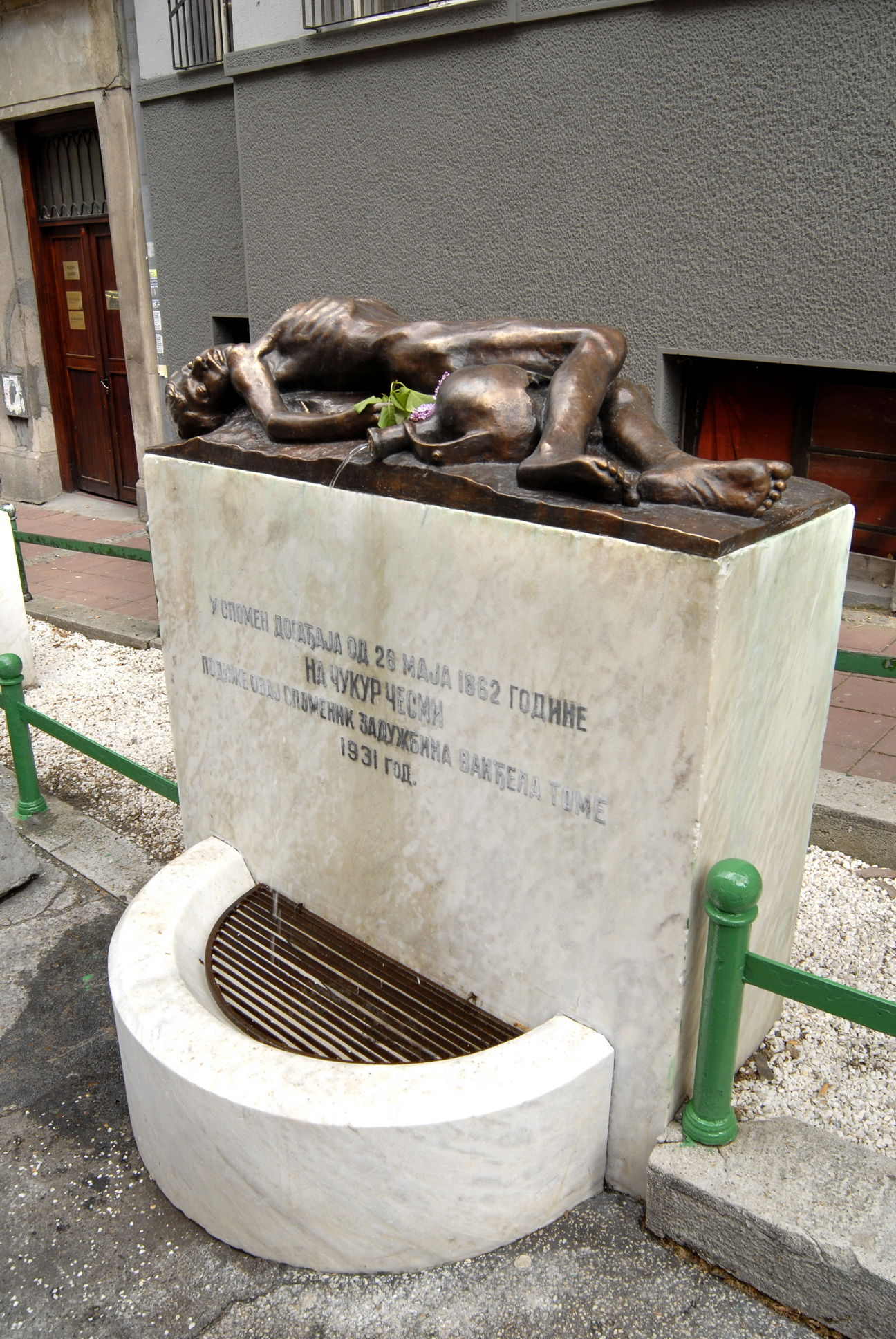
Čukur Fountain

The Čukur Fountain (Serbian: Чукур чесма/Čukur česma) is a monument built to commemorate the Čukur Fountain incident of 15 June 1862, starting with the death of a boy -- Savo Petković -- and growing into a conflict between Serbia and the Ottoman Empire (Serbia being under Ottoman suzerainty at that time). After a quarrel at a fountain, the Serbian and Turkish police came to shoot at each other, after which a riot broke out in the town that lasted the night. The following day, a truce was agreed and the Ottoman police was ordered to leave the Belgrade Fortress, with safe passage guaranteed by the Serbian government. The day after that, while the Pasha of Belgrade summoned the consuls to the fortress, Ottoman cannons were set off shelling the town, leading to the death of 50 civilians and soldiers, 20 houses destroyed, and another 357 damaged. The cause of the Pasha's order is unknown, while some sources suggested that the bombardment was triggered by Serbians firing muskets at the fortress, the British Consul-General concluded that the bombardment was "the mere result of panic and false alarm". The Great Powers met and decided that Ottoman troops leave the Belgrade Fortress; in the following year more than 8,000 Muslims left the city.

The monument and fountain is located in Dobračina Street in Belgrade, Serbia, at the site of the initial altercation. The fountain features a bronze sculpture of the apprentice boy that was killed, titled "The Boy With a Broken Pitcher". The memorial fountain was erected in 1931 from an endowment fund established by a tobacco merchant named Toma Vanđel in his will. The design for the bronze sculpture on the marble pedestal was done by Simeon Roksandić, a sculptors of the Serbian Realist movement. A thirteen-year-old boy, Vlastimir Petković, was the model for the sculpture (it was a coincidence that he had the same last name as the victim of the conflict).

The following words are written on the monument:

"IN THE MEMORY OF THE EVENTS OF 26 May
IN 1862,
AT ČUKUR FOUNTAIN,
THIS MONUMENT IS ERECTED AS THE LEGACY OF VANĐEL TOMA
IN 1931."

(All sources for the event mention 15 June 1862 (N.S) which is 3 June (O.S). It is not known why 26 May is used on the monument.)

The first competition for the monument was opened in 1912, but the outbreak of World War I postponed the raising of the monument. There is little information about that tender, probably because of the spreading of the First World War, which disabled the building of the monument.

In 1927, Roksandić submitted the design for the monument to the art section of the Municipality of the City of Belgrade. The monument was built with the sculpture a marble pedestal, and a small pool where the water from the pitcher spilled. A marble bench was placed next to the fountain. The monument was completed in 1931.

On 5 February 1965 the fountain was declared a cultural monument.

In May 2010, vandals stole the sculpture of the boy, banged it with a hammer and sold it to the owner of an unauthorized dump in Krnjača for 20 thousand RSD. The sculpture was broken into 22 pieces but was ultimately repaired. The reconstruction took three months to complete.
