= III Gymnasium Split =

Public high school in Split, Croatia

III Gymnasium
- III. gimnazija

Location
- Ulica Matice hrvatske 11; HR-21000 Split; Croatia
- 43.5105°N 16.4644°E

Information
- Former names: Civil Engineering Education Center Ćiro Gamulin (1978); MIOC (1986); Science and Mathematics Gymnasium (1992); III Gymnasium (1993)
- School type: Public, Gymnasium
- Established: 1992; 34 years ago
- Secondary years taught: 9–12
  - Grade 9: 168 (2024–25)
- Language: Croatian
- Website: Official website (in Croatian)
- Last updated: June 17, 2025

Third Gymnasium (Croatian: III. gimnazija, Treća gimnazija) is a high school in Split, Croatia. It was previously called MIOC (Matematičko informatički obrazovni centar; lit. 'Mathematical Informatical Educational Center'), and is still well known under that name.

After the school year 2023/24, 136 graduates of this gymnasium enrolled at an institution of higher learning in Croatia, or 97.14% of students who took up the nationwide Matura exams. The most common destinations for these students were the University of Split faculties of electrical engineering, mechanical engineering and shipbuilding, science, and civil engineering, architecture and geodesy, as well as University of Zagreb faculties of electrical engineering and computing, and science.
