= Journal de Théorie des Nombres de Bordeaux =

- Discipline: Number theory
- Language: English, French
- Edited by: Denis Benois

Publication details
- History: 1989-present
- Publisher: Institut de Mathématiques de Bordeaux on behalf of the Société Arithmétique de Bordeaux
- Frequency: Triannually
- Open access: Yes

Standard abbreviations
- ISO 4: J. Théor. Nr. Bordx.
- MathSciNet: J. Théor. Nombres Bordeaux

Indexing
- ISSN: 1246-7405 (print); 2118-8572 (web)
- LCCN: 95641555
- OCLC no.: 473644925

Links
- Journal homepage; Online access; Online archive

The Journal de Théorie des Nombres de Bordeaux is a triannual peer-reviewed open-access scientific journal covering number theory and related topics. It was established in 1989 and is published by the Institut de Mathématiques de Bordeaux on behalf of the Société Arithmétique de Bordeaux. The editor-in-chief is Denis Benois (University of Bordeaux).

== Abstracting and indexing ==
The journal is abstracted and indexed in Current Contents/Physical, Chemical & Earth Sciences, Zentralblatt MATH, Mathematical Reviews, Science Citation Index Expanded, and Scopus. According to the Journal Citation Reports, the journal has a 2015 impact factor of 0.294.
