= XV Gymnasium =

XV. gimnazija

Location
- Jordanovac 8 Zagreb; Croatia; 45°49′11″N 16°00′25″E

Information
- Type: Public
- Motto: A school for the knowledge society
- Established: 1964
- Principal: Nikola Dmitrović
- Faculty: around 100
- Grades: 1–4
- Enrollment: around 1050
- Colors: Blue
- Website: XV. gimnazija

Fifteenth Gymnasium (Croatian: XV. gimnazija, Petnaesta gimnazija) is a public high school in Zagreb, Croatia. It specializes in mathematics and computer science. It was previously called MIOC (Matematičko informatički obrazovni centar; lit. 'Mathematical Informatical Educational Center') and is still well known under that name.

== History ==
The school was founded as Fifteenth Mathematical Gymnasium (XV. matematička gimnazija) in 1964. It was among the first schools in former Yugoslavia specializing in mathematics along with Mathematical Gymnasium (Matematička gimnazija) in Belgrade.

The first principal was Stefanija Bakarić, sister of Vladimir Bakarić, one of the leading politicians in the ruling League of Communists of Yugoslavia and the chairman of the League of Communists of Croatia at the time. The original curriculum was composed with the help from acclaimed university professors Svetozar Kurepa, Branimir Marković and Vladimir Devide. At the beginning, most of the teachers were university professors.

In 1965, it became the first school in Croatia to have information science as a school subject. Students first got the chance to work on actual computers in 1980.

In 1977, the school moved from the Sutlanska street to a new building in the Jordanovac street and merged with the XIV Gymnasium (XIV. gimnazija, also then known as 25. maj) and a part of the VII Gymnasium (VII. gimnazija). The newly founded school was named Education Center for Mathematics and Computer Science (Matematičko informatički obrazovni centar), abbreviated as MIOC. The school is still informally widely known under that name.

In 1982, MIOC was renamed to MIOC Vladimir Popović after the World War II Partisan commander in Croatia.

In 1991, after the dissolution of Yugoslavia, the school changed its name and was once again known as Fifteenth Gymnasium.

In 2007, the management of the school planned to hold a celebration of its thirty years of existence which sparked strong protests from alumni who graduated before 1977. In the end, the school held the celebration while mentioning both 1964 and 1977 as important dates in the history of the school.

== Building ==
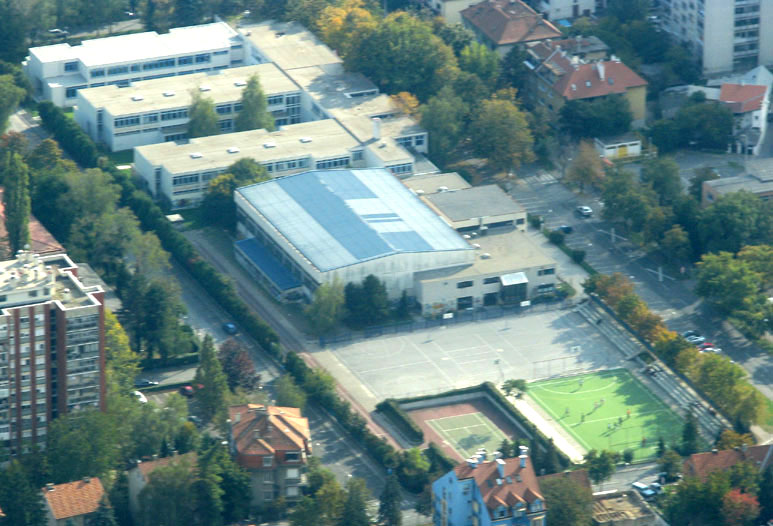
Aerial view of the school. In the upper-left corner, the new wing can be seen.

The school moved to the current building in Jordanovac, which is in the Maksimir neighborhood of Zagreb, in the seventies. Before that, it was located in an older building in Sutlanska street in Trnje. The new building was built especially for this purpose and thus contains some of the best high school infrastructure schools in Zagreb, Croatia. There are two gyms, an outdoor sports center, a cafeteria, and a movie theater.

In 2008, the third wing of the building was opened. With an increased number of classrooms, the classes now take place only in the morning while afternoons are reserved for extracurricular activities, a relative rarity among Croatian schools.

== Curriculum ==
There are around 1200 students divided into two parts: the so-called "national program" and the International Baccalaureate program.

In the national program, the students follow the curriculum of mathematical - natural scientific gymnasium, as outlined by the Ministry of Science, Education and Sports (Ministarstvo znanosti, obrazovanja i športa). There are three sub-programs, the "Information Science" program which has an additional weekly hour of mathematics and an additional weekly hour of computer science, the Mathematics program. with two additional weekly hours of mathematics, and the "General" program with two weekly hours of a second foreign language, usually German.

The International Baccalaureate program, implemented at the school in 1991, is not publicly funded but is instead financed by student tuitions. In it, the school follows the usual IB curriculum, divided into two segments: IB Middle Years Programme (grades 9 and 10) and IB Diploma Programme (grades 11 and 12). Around 200 Croatian and foreign students are in IB classes. All the classes are conducted in English.

== Extracurricular Activities and Successes ==
University students work along full-time teachers preparing the students, which is a rather uncommon way of preparing used only in a few other Croatian schools.

Among most notable international results are multiple successes, both in team and single events, at:

- International Olympiad in Informatics
- International Mathematical Olympiad
- International Physics Olympiad
- International Astronomy Olympiad
- International Junior Science Olympiad.

Also noted in the local media, arguably even more than the more important successes mentioned above, were the successes in American Computer Science League, controversially painted in the media as "triumph of knowledge over wealth".

Most of the students participating in the international and top-tier national competitions come from the publicly funded national program.

== Cooperation ==
Besides cooperating with many governmental and non-governmental organizations dealing with education in Zagreb, the school is noted for its long-standing friendship with Second Gymnasium (II. gimnazija) in Maribor, Slovenia. The students of Second Gymnasium participated in the school celebrations in 2007 with the performance of the musical We Will Rock You.

Also, the school runs an exchange and cooperation program with Kasetsart University Laboratory School, one of the more notable schools in Bangkok, Thailand.

== Alumni ==
After the school year 2023/24, 200 graduates of this gymnasium enrolled at an institution of higher learning in Croatia, or 95.69% of students who took up the nationwide Matura exams. The most common destinations for these students were the University of Zagreb faculties of electrical engineering and computing, science, medicine, mechanical engineering and naval architecture, and architecture.

As Fifteenth Gymnasium specializes in mathematics and computer science, most alumni of the school continue their studies at the Faculty of Electrical Engineering and Computing (FER) and at the Faculty of Science (PMF) at the University of Zagreb. There are many alumni working at aforementioned faculties ranging from teaching assistants to academics, such as Marko Tadić, a professor at the Department of Mathematics. Branko Jeren, who was the Minister of Science and Technology of Croatia in the mid-nineties, who is also currently a professor at FER, is also an alumnus of the school.

Many of MIOC graduates went abroad, either immediately after finishing high school or later. Among the most scientists who graduated from MIOC is Marin Soljačić, a physicist currently residing in the United States. Some later returned to Croatia, but continued working internationally, such as Bojan Žagrović.

With regard to areas other than science, the alumni include Denis Kuljiš, a known Croatian political columnist and reporter, some national TV personalities and actors such as Filip Brajković, Amar Bukvić (who graduated in the International Baccalaureate program) and Domagoj Novokmet, who acted as a host for the celebration of the school held in 2007 in Vatroslav Lisinski Concert Hall.

Football player Niko Kranjčar also graduated from MIOC. Andrej Kramarić, also a professional footballer from Zagreb, had graduated from the school in 2010.

In 2020, five of the school's alumni, along with the school itself, established MIOC Alumni Foundation, the main goal of which is to provide students with financial and non-financial support, as well as to provide insight into colleges the school's students mostly apply for, both in-state and abroad.
