= Svetozar Kurepa =

Yugoslavian and Croatian Serb mathematician

- Born: 25 May 1929; Majske Poljane, Kingdom of Serbs, Croats and Slovenes
- Died: 2 February 2010 (aged 80); Zagreb, Croatia
- Education: University of Zagreb
- Known for: Functional analysis and Operator theory
- Awards: National Award for Lifetime Achievement (2006); Davorin Trstenjak Prize (1984); City of Zagreb Prize (1968); Ruder Boskovic Prize (1963)
- Scientific career
- Fields: Mathematics
- Workplaces: University of Zagreb; University of Maryland; Georgetown University; University of Waterloo; Niels Bohr Institute; University of Milan

Svetozar Kurepa (25 May 1929 – 2 February 2010) was a Yugoslavian and Croatian mathematician whose main contributions were in the areas of functional analysis and operator theory. Kurepa published over 70 articles, 16 books, and numerous scientific reviews. He taught at the University of Zagreb, where he also served as the Dean of the College of Sciences. He taught in North America at the University of Maryland, at Georgetown University, and at the University of Waterloo. In Europe he worked at the Niels Bohr Institute in Denmark and the University of Milan.

== Early life ==
According to family tradition, his ancestors hailed from Durmitor. Svetozar Kurepa was born in a Serb family in Majske Poljane, in what was then the Kingdom of Serbs, Croats and Slovenes and now part of Croatia near what is today Glina. World War II interrupted his education. After the war, he completed high-school in Zagreb. He received a diploma in mathematics from the University of Zagreb in 1952. From 1954 to 1956 he worked at the Niels Bohr Institute in Copenhagen. He married in 1955. He earned a doctorate in mathematics at the University of Zagreb in 1958. Rising rapidly from Assistant to Full Professor, he taught at the University of Zagreb, with some notable absences, for the remainder of his career.

Academic Nikola Hajdin claimed that Svetozar Kurepa was pressured to convert to Greek Catholic Church.

== Middle years ==
In 1960–61, he taught at the University of Maryland. In 1963, he won the Ruđer Bošković Prize for his work in functional analysis. He spent the 1966–67 academic year at Georgetown University. He won the Prize of the City of Zagreb for Scientific, Teaching, and Professional Activities in 1968. The 1970–71 academic year was spent teaching at the University of Waterloo in Canada, and he briefly visited there again in 1986. In 1982, Kurepa spent a small part of the year at the University of Milan (the Federigo Enriques Institute). He served as the Head of Graduate Studies in Mathematics at the University of Zagreb during 1965–1970, 1972–1980, and 1984–1988.

== Later years ==
Kurepa served in various administrative roles at the University of Zagreb. Under different titles, he served as the head of the Department of Mathematics from 1978 to 1986. He was the Director of the Mathematics Department from 1978 to 1982. Then he was the Dean of the Department from 1982 to 1986. He served as Dean of the College of Sciences from 1986 to 1988, at which time he stepped away from administrative duties. He continued teaching and publishing until 1999 when he retired. He was named Professor Emeritus in 2000. His last book was published in 2001. In 2006, he received the National Lifetime Achievement Award.

== Legacy ==
Kurepa’s most important results were in functional analysis and operator theory. Among his most significant books are Konačno dimenzionalni vektori, prostori i primjene (1967), and Funkcionalna analiza: Elementi teorije operatora (1980). In addition, he authored or co-authored many university-level and high-school level mathematics textbooks. Generations of students in Yugoslavia, and later Croatia, learned mathematics through those books. His work, and that of his uncle, Đuro Kurepa, made the name Kurepa virtually synonymous with mathematics in the Balkans during the twentieth century.

== Other notes ==
The Kurepa family also produced the noted physicist Milan Kurepa. Svetozar Kurepa was critical to the founding of the XV Gymnasium.
