= Đuro Kurepa =

Yugoslav and Serbian mathematician, university professor and academic

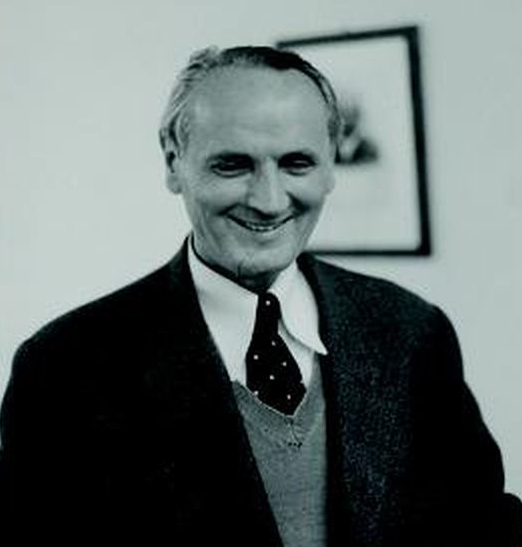
- Kurepa in 1976
- Born: Đurađ Kurepa; 16 August 1907; Majske Poljane, Kingdom of Croatia-Slavonia, Austria-Hungary
- Died: 2 November 1993 (aged 86); Belgrade, Serbia, FR Yugoslavia
- Resting place: Belgrade New Cemetery
- Education: University of Zagreb; University of Paris
- Known for: Set theory logic Erdős–Rado–Kurepa theorem Kurepa tree
- Awards: AVNOJ Award; ICM Speaker (1954, 1958)
- Scientific career
- Fields: Mathematics
- Workplaces: University of Zagreb; University of Belgrade
- Doctoral advisor: Maurice René Fréchet
- Doctoral students: Aleksandar Ivić; Ljubisa D.R. Kocinac; Stevo Todorčević

Đuro Kurepa (Serbian Cyrillic: Ђуро Курепа, pronounced [dʑǔːro kǔrepa]; 16 August 1907 – 2 November 1993) was a Yugoslav and Serbian mathematician, university professor and academic.

Throughout his life, Kurepa published over 700 articles, books, papers, and reviews and over 1,000 scientific reviews. He lectured at universities across Europe, as well as those in Canada, Cuba, Iraq, Israel, and the United States, and was quoted saying "I lectured at almost each of [the] nineteen universities of [the former] Yugoslavia..."

== Early life ==
Born as Đurađ Kurepa in Majske Poljane, Kingdom of Croatia-Slavonia, Austria-Hungary to a Serb family. In English, his name was transliterated as Djuro Kurepa while in French he is often attributed as Georges Kurepa. Kurepa was the youngest of Rade and Anđelija Kurepa's fourteen children. His nephew was the mathematician Svetozar Kurepa.

He began his schooling in Majske Poljane, continued his education in Glina, and graduated from high school in Križevci. He received a diploma in theoretical mathematics and physics from the University of Zagreb in 1931, and began work as an assistant in the teaching of mathematics the same year. Kurepa then went to the Collège de France and the University of Paris, where he received his doctoral diploma in 1935; his advisor was French mathematician Maurice René Fréchet, and his thesis was titled Ensembles ordonnés et ramifiés.

== Career ==
Kurepa continued to receive post-doctoral education at Warsaw University in Poland and the University of Paris. He became an assistant professor at the University of Zagreb in 1937, associate professor the next year, and assumed the position of full professor in 1948. After the end of World War II and the formation of the Socialist Federal Republic of Yugoslavia, he traveled to five universities in the United States: Harvard University in Cambridge, Massachusetts, the University of Chicago in Chicago, Illinois, the branch of the University of California at Berkeley and the branch at Los Angeles, California the Institute for Advanced Study in Princeton, New Jersey and Columbia University in New York City, New York.

Kurepa was an International Congress of Mathematicians Plenary Speaker in 1954 and 1958.

In 1965, Kurepa shifted to the University of Belgrade, where he focused on the mathematical fields of logic and set theory. Kurepa was a member of several organizations, including the Serbian Academy of Sciences and Arts and the Yugoslav Academy of Sciences and Arts. He was also the founder and president of the Society of Mathematicians and Physicists of Croatia, the founder and chief editor of the journal Mathematica Balkanica, and the president of the Yugoslav National Committee for Mathematics, the Balkan Mathematical Society, and the Union of Yugoslav Societies of Mathematicians, Physicisists and Astronomers. He received the AVNOJ Award in 1976, and retired from the University of Belgrade in 1977.

He published his scientific works in the most notable European and world scientific journals, including: Mathematische Annalen, Izvestiya Akademii nauk SSSR, Fundamenta Mathematicae, Acta Mathematica, Comptes rendus de l'Académie des Sciences, Bulletin de la Société Mathématique de France, Zeitschrift für mathematische Logik und Grundlagen der Mathematik, Journal of Symbolic Logic, Pacific Journal of Mathematics.

== Death and legacy ==
On 1 November 1993, Kurepa was robbed and beaten after retrieving his pension from a bank. He was then hidden from view under a set of stairs. He succumbed to his injuries on 2 November 1993 in a Belgrade emergency ward. He is interred in the Alley of Distinguished Citizens in the Belgrade New Cemetery.

As a mathematician, he is known especially for his works on set theory and general topology.

Kurepa influenced set theory in several ways, including lending his name to the Kurepa tree. According to Kajetan Šeper, Kurepa's colleague from the University of Zagreb:

Professor Kurepa was not only the professional mathematician and teacher, but he was a scientist, philosopher, and humanist as well, in the true sense of these words. He was the founder and pioneer in mathematical logic and the foundations of mathematics in Croatia, and modern mathematical theories in Croatia and Yugoslavia. Generally speaking, he was the catalyzer, the initiator, and the bearer of mathematical science.

According to the Mathematics Genealogy Project, Kurepa supervised 27 students, including analytic number theorist Aleksandar Ivić, set theorist Stevo Todorčević and topologist Ljubisa D.R. Kocinac.

== Awards ==
- AVNOJ award, 1976
- Bernard Bolzano Charter, Prague, 1981
- Order of Labour, 1965
- Order of Merits for the People with a golden star, 1979

== Selected works ==
Books

- Teorija skupova, Belgrade, 1951
- ŠTO SU SKUPOVI I KAKVA IM JE ULOGA, Zagreb, 1960
- Viša algebra - knjiga prva, Belgrade, 1969
- Viša algebra - knjiga druga, Belgrade, 1969
- Selected Papers of Đuro Kurepa, Belgrade, 1996–12

Scientific works

- Kurepa, Đuro (1935), "Ensembles ordonnés et ramifiés", Publ. Math. Univ. Belgrade, 4: 1–138
- SUR LES ENSEMBLES ORDONNES DENOMBRABLES, Zagreb, 1948
- O REALNIM FUNKCIJAMA U OBITELjI SKUPOVA RACIONALNIH BROJEVA, Zagreb, 1953
- On universal ramified sets, Zagreb, 1963
- Monotone mappings between some kinds of ordered sets, Zagreb, 1964
- Publikovani naučni radovi Đura Kurepe 1961 - 1976, Belgrade, 2012
