= D6 road (Croatia) =

Road in Croatia

D6 state road

Route information
- Length: 134.5 km (83.6 mi)

Major junctions
- From: Jurovski Brod border crossing to Slovenia
- D228 in Jurovski Brod; D1 in Karlovac; D3 in Karlovac; D216 in Vojnić; D31 in Glina; D37 in Glina; D47 in Dvor
- To: Dvor border crossing to Bosnia and Herzegovina

Location
- Country: Croatia
- Counties: Karlovac, Sisak-Moslavina
- Major cities: Karlovac, Vojnić, Glina, Dvor

Highway system
- Highways in Croatia

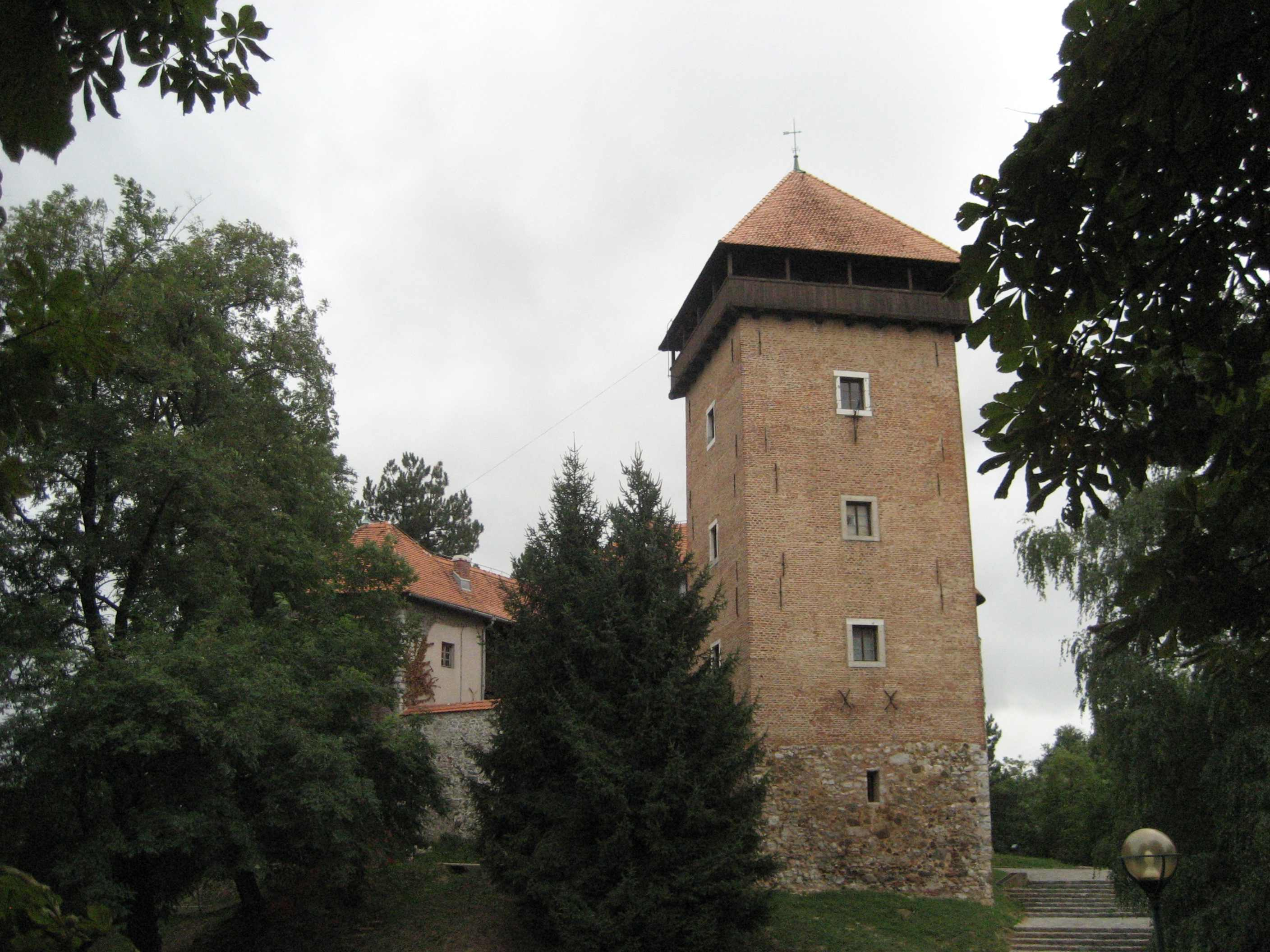
Karlovac, on the D6 road route

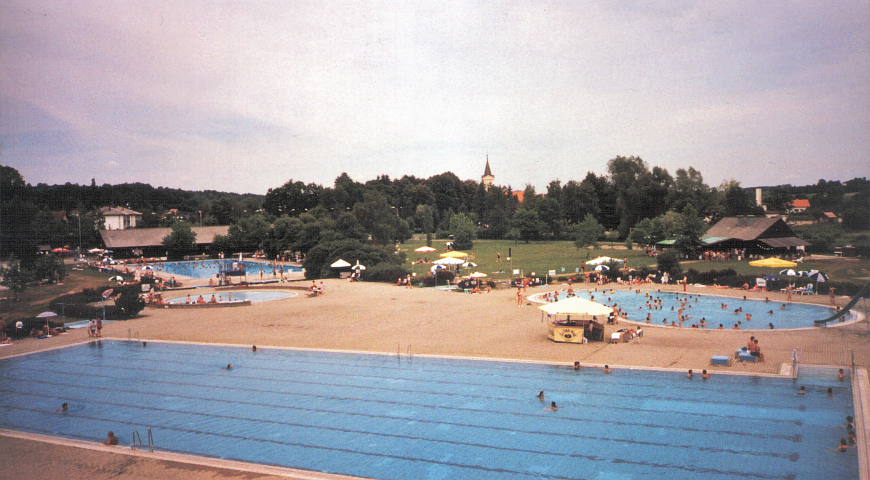
Topusko, in immediate vicinity of the D6 road

D6 is a state road in central parts of Croatia connecting Jurovski Brod border crossing to Slovenia and Dvor border crossing to Bosnia and Herzegovina via Karlovac, Vojnić, Glina and Dvor. The road also serves as a connection to the A1 motorway Karlovac interchange via the D1 state road in Karlovac. The road is 134.5 km (83.6 mi) long.

The road, like all state roads in Croatia, is managed and maintained by Hrvatske ceste, a state-owned company.

== Traffic volume ==
Traffic is regularly counted and reported by Hrvatske ceste, the operator of the road.

D6 traffic volume
Road	Counting site	AADT	ASDT	Notes
D6	1801 Jurovski Brod	2,465	3,096	Between Jurovski Brod border crossing and the D228 junction. Average daily traffic figure is provided instead of AADT.
D6	1802 Ribnik	1,914	2,365	Adjacent to the Ž3140 junction.
D6	3108 Okić - west	2,222	2,608	Adjacent to the L34093 junction.
D6	3102 Gvozd - west	1,282	1,984	Adjacent to the Ž3186 junction. The AADT figure estimated by Hrvatske ceste.
D6	3206 Maja	551	668	Adjacent to the Ž3237 junction.
D6	3210 Trgovi	388	495	Adjacent to the Ž3234 junction.

== Road junctions and populated areas ==
D6 junctions/populated areas
Type	Slip roads/Notes
	Jurovski Brod border crossing to Slovenia; Slovenian route 105 to Metlika, Slovenia. The northern terminus of the road.
	Jurovski Brod; D228 to Ozalj and Karlovac (D1).
	Ž3140 to Pravutina and Ribnik (the road loops to Pravutina and back to the D6 at Ribnik).
	Ribnik
	Jarnevići
	Netretić; Ž3141 to Vukova Gorica (D3).
	Brajakovo Brdo
	Donje Stative; Ž3142 to Novigrad and Jarče Polje (D3). Ž3144 to Mali Erjavec (D228).
	Karlovac; D1 and D3 to Jastrebarsko and A1 motorway Karlovac interchange (to the north). The D1 and D3 roads are concurrent to the north of their junction with the D6 (to the north) and all three are concurrent to the south of their junction in Karlovac. Another D3 junction is located further south within the city of Karlovac, where the D3 road concurrency ends as the D3 diverges towards Delnice. The D1/D3/D6 junction represents location where the westbound D6 traffic enters Karlovac urban expressway.
	The southern terminus of dual carriageway expressway through Karlovac.
	Mostanje
	Turanj; Ž3186 to Skakavac, Gvozd and Perna.
	Cerovac Vukmanićki
	Tušilović
	Brezova Glava; D1 to Korenica, Knin and Split (to the south). The D1 and D6 roads to the north are concurrent.
	Okić
	Živković Kosa
	Knežević Kosa
	Vojnić; D216 to Kolarić and Maljevac border crossing to Bosnia and Herzegovina.
	Crevarska Strana
	Gvozd; Ž3186 to Turanj (D1) (to the north) and to Perna (to the south).
	Blatuša; Ž3152 to Bović, Lasinja and the D36 state road.
	Donja Čemernica
	Ž3229 to Topusko, Katinovac and Maljevac (D216).
	Šatornja
	Ž3227 to Topusko.
	D31 to Gornji Viduševac and Velika Gorica (D30).
	Glina; D37 to Petrinja and Sisak (D36). Ž3223 to Donji Viduševac, Dvorišće and Hađer. Ž3231 to Veliki Obljaj and Bosanska Bojna border crossing to Bosnia and Herzegovina.
	Ž3232 to Majske Poljane.
	Maja
	Ž3234 to Veliki Šušnjar, Miočinovići and Donja Stupnica. The road loops from the D6 road and back forming two intersections.
	Ž3237 to Bijele Vode.
	Dragotina; Ž3238 to Mali Gradac.
	Donji Žirovac
	Komora
	Gvozdansko
	Trgovi
	Grmušani
	Vanići
	Ž3262 to Donji Javoranj.
	Dvor; D47 to Hrvatska Kostajnica, Hrvatska Dubica, Novska and Lipik (D5).
	Matijevići
	Dvor border crossing to Bosnia Herzegovina. The road extends to Novi Grad, Bosnia and Herzegovina. The southern terminus of the road.
