= D37 road (Croatia) =

Road in Croatia

D37 state road

Route information
- Length: 34.4 km (21.4 mi)

Major junctions
- From: D36 in Sisak
- D224 in Mošćenica; D30 in Petrinja
- To: D6 in Glina

Location
- Country: Croatia
- Counties: Sisak-Moslavina
- Major cities: Sisak, Petrinja, Glina

Highway system
- Highways in Croatia

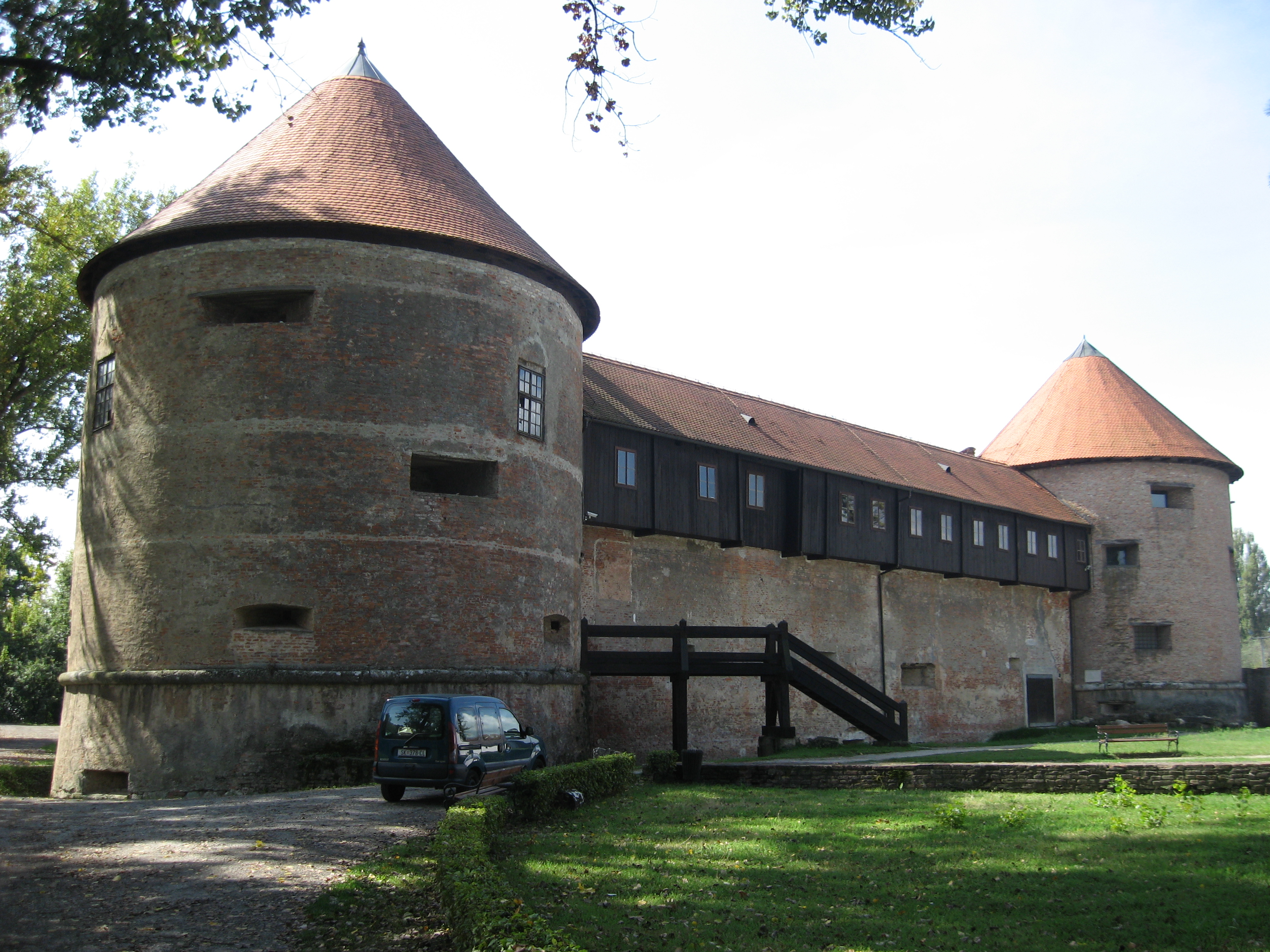
Sisak, at the northern terminus of the D37 road

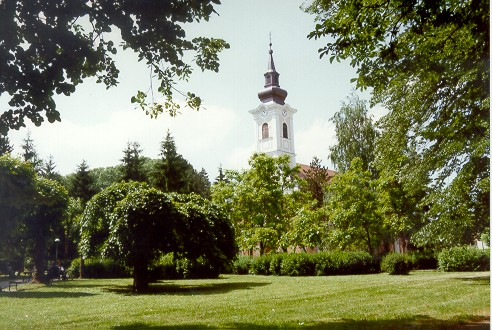
Petrinja, on the D37 road route

D37 is a state road in Banovina region of Croatia connecting Sisak, Petrinja and Glina. The road is 34.4 km (21.4 mi) long.

Just like all other state roads in Croatia, the D37 is managed and maintained by Hrvatske ceste, a state-owned company.

== Traffic volume ==
Traffic is regularly counted and reported by Hrvatske ceste, operator of the road. Section of the road running through Sisak is not covered by the traffic counting sites, but the section is assumed to carry a substantial volume of urban traffic in addition to the regular D37 traffic.

D37 traffic volume
| Road | Counting site | AADT | ASDT | Notes |
| D37 | 3203 Petrinja | 8,699 | 9,353 | Adjacent to the D224 junction. |

== Road junctions and populated areas ==
D37 junctions/populated areas
| Type | Slip roads/Notes |
| | Sisak; D36 to the A3 motorway Popovača interchange (to the east) and to Pokupsko and Karlovac (D1) (to the west). The northern terminus of the road. |
| | Mošćenica; D224 to Blinjski Kut, Sunja and Panjani (D30). |
| | Petrinja; D30 to Velika Gorica (D31) (to the north) and to Hrvatska Kostajnica (D47) (to the south). Ž3199 to Petrinja railway station (L217 railway). Ž3200 within the city to the D30 state road. Ž3202 to Nova Drenčina. |
| | Novo Selište |
| | Ž3198 to Gornje Mokrice and Nebojan. |
| | Župić |
| | Ž3197 to Strašnik. |
| | Gora |
| | Ž3196 to Glinska Poljana, Slana and Novi Farkašić. |
| | Marinbrod |
| | Kihalac |
| | Prekopa; Ž3195 to Mala Solina, Zaloj and Slatina Pokupska (D31). |
| | Glina; D6 to Dvor (to the east) and to Vojnić and Karlovac (to the west). The western terminus of the road. |
