= Gornje Jame massacre =

1991 massacre in Croatia

- Part of the Croatian War of Independence
- Gornje Jame on the map of Croatia. Territories controlled by Serb or JNA forces in late December 1991 are highlighted in red.
- Location: 45.408°N 16.116°E; Gornje Jame, Croatia
- Date: 11 December 1991
- Target: 15 Croats, one Serb
- Attack type: Summary executions, ethnic cleansing
- Deaths: 16
- Perpetrator: Šiltovi Serbian paramilitary unit

The Gornje Jame massacre was the killing of fifteen Croat civilians in Gornje Jame, a village near Glina, by the Serbian paramilitary force called Šiltovi.

== Events ==
In 1991, seventeen Croats, twenty-four Serbs and three others lived in Gornje Jame. On December 11 of that year, armed members of the Šiltovi paramilitary force entered Mate Kireta's house and assembled twelve Croat civilians there, including seven women and three children. The children were two sisters, Nikolina, age 9, and Željka Fabac, age 14, and Darko Dvorenković, age 10. Among the other victims were three women from Mala Solina, Donje Jame and Hađer, who had taken refuge at their cousins' residence.

The precise circumstances of the deaths remain unknown, as well as the fate of the women. There is speculation that they were murdered and burned in the house. Another theory is that they were taken alive to an unknown place where they were killed, their bodies buried in mud to conceal the crime.

Gojko Pavlović, a Serbian man from Donje Jame, was gunned down while trying to protect his Croatian neighbours. Three Croatian man from Gornje Jame were imprisoned on November 3, 1991, and then killed near a creek between Donje and Gornje Jame. They were exhumed and buried in 1996.

== Memorial ==
In 2012, a monument was built in Gornje Jame to commemorate the victims of the massacre.

== See also ==
- List of massacres in Croatia
