= Vlahovići =

Vlahovići may refer to:

- Vlahovići, Ljubinje, a village in Bosnia and Herzegovina
- Vlahovići (Novo Goražde), a village in Bosnia and Herzegovina
- Vlahovići (Pale), a village in Bosnia and Herzegovina
- Vlahovići, Travnik, a village in Bosnia and Herzegovina
- Vlahovići (Višegrad), a village in Bosnia and Herzegovina

== See also ==
- Vlahović, Croatia
