= Jugovac =

Jugovac may refer to:

- Jugovac, Serbia, a village near Prokuplje
- Jugovac, Croatia, a village near Žakanje
