= Bijele Vode =

Bijele Vode, which translates as White Waters from Serbo-Croatian, may refer to:

- Bijele Vode, Croatia, a village near Glina, Croatia
- Bijele Vode (Kakanj), a village in Kakanj, Bosnia and Herzegovina
- Bijele Vode (Zenica), a village in Zenica, Bosnia and Herzegovina
