= Dvorište =

Dvorište may refer to:

Croatia

- Dvorište, former name of Dvorišće, Sisak-Moslavina County, a village near Glina
- Dvorište, Karlovac County, a village near Krnjak

Czech Republic

- Dvořiště, a fish pond in the Czech Republic

North Macedonia

- Dvorište, Berovo, a village
- Dvorište, Gradsko, a village in Gradsko Municipality

Serbia

- Dvorište (Despotovac), a village
- Dvorište (Golubac), a village
- Dvorište (Šabac), a village
