= Maja, Croatia =

Maja
- Village
- Interactive map of Maja
- Location within Croatia
- Coordinates: 45°17′N 16°09′E
- Country: Croatia
- Region: Continental Croatia (Banovina)
- County: Sisak-Moslavina
- Municipality: Glina

Area
  - Total: 2.8 km^{2} (1.1 sq mi)

Population (2021)
  - Total: 142
  - Density: 51/km^{2} (130/sq mi)
- Time zone: UTC+1 (CET)
  - Summer (DST): UTC+2 (CEST)

Maja is a village in Croatia. It is connected by the D6 highway.
