= Natko =

Natko (Croatian pronunciation: [nǎtko] is a Croatian male given name. Notable people with the surname include:

- Natko Devčić (1914–1997), Croatian composer
- Natko Nodilo (1834–1912), Croatian politician and historian
- Natko Rački (born 1981), former Croatian footballer
- Natko Zrnčić-Dim (born 1986), Croatian alpine ski racer
