= Marinbrod =

- Village
- Interactive map of Marinbrod
- Country: Croatia
- Region: Continental Croatia (Banovina)
- County: Sisak-Moslavina
- Municipality: Glina

Area
  - Total: 3.2 km^{2} (1.2 sq mi)

Population (2021)
  - Total: 71
  - Density: 22/km^{2} (57/sq mi)
- Time zone: UTC+1 (CET)
  - Summer (DST): UTC+2 (CEST)

Marinbrod is a village in Croatia. It is connected by the D37 highway. Marinbrod got its name in 1799 after its benefactor Mari Sigur.
