= Komora =

Coordinates: 45°08′09″N 16°10′50″E

Komora Комора (Serbian)
- Village
- Interactive map of Komora
- Country: Croatia
- Region: Continental Croatia (Banovina)
- County: Sisak-Moslavina
- Municipality: Dvor

Area
  - Total: 8.3 km^{2} (3.2 sq mi)

Population (2021)
  - Total: 7
  - Density: 0.84/km^{2} (2.2/sq mi)
- Time zone: UTC+1 (CET)
  - Summer (DST): UTC+2 (CEST)

Komora (Serbian Cyrillic: Комора) is a village in Croatia, connected by the D6 highway. The village had only 26 residents living there in 2001, on some 13 properties. Before the Yugoslav wars, 178 people resided in the village, according to the 1991 census. At its peak in 1931 the population stood at 432 residents but it has been declining ever since. Komora is populated by Serbs who work in agriculture.
