= Prekopa, Sisak-Moslavina County =

Prekopa
- Village
- Location within Croatia
- Coordinates: 45°22′01″N 16°07′25″E
- Country: Croatia
- Region: Continental Croatia (Banovina)
- County: Sisak-Moslavina
- Municipality: Glina

Area
  - Total: 2.1 km^{2} (0.81 sq mi)
- Elevation: 107 m (351 ft)

Population (2021)
  - Total: 125
  - Density: 60/km^{2} (150/sq mi)
- Time zone: UTC+1 (CET)
  - Summer (DST): UTC+2 (CEST)
- Postal code: 44400 Glina
- Area code: +385 0(44)

Prekopa is a village in Croatia. It is connected by the D37 highway. The name of the place, Prekopa, was first mentioned in 1274, and the name comes from the words precopa or praecopa and was originally the name for the road.
