= Župić =

Coordinates: 45°25′43″N 16°13′48″E

- Village
- Interactive map of Župić
- Country: Croatia
- Region: Continental Croatia (Banovina)
- County: Sisak-Moslavina
- Municipality: Petrinja

Area
  - Total: 0.69 sq mi (1.8 km^{2})

Population (2021)
  - Total: 74
  - Density: 110/sq mi (41/km^{2})
- Time zone: UTC+1 (CET)
  - Summer (DST): UTC+2 (CEST)

Župić is a village in Croatia. It is connected by the D37 highway.
