= Budački castle =

Medieval castle ruins in Croatia

Coordinates: 45°21′58″N 15°35′53″E

Budački
- Croatia
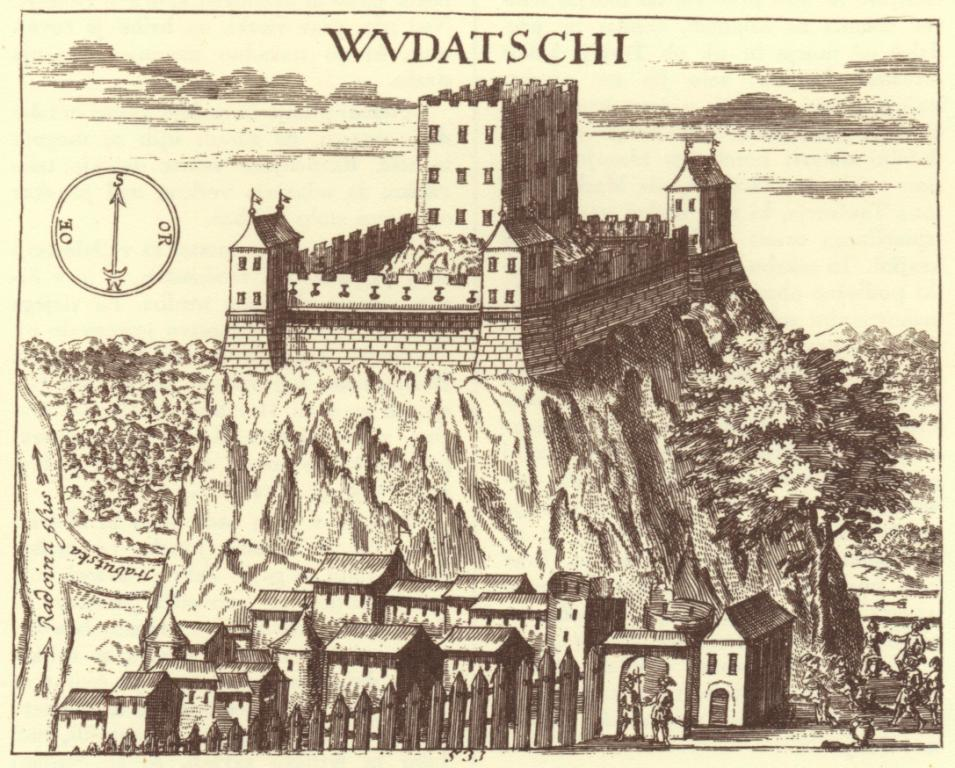
- Budački castle as depicted by Valvasor in 1689

Site information
- Type: Castle
- Owner: private
- Open to the public: no
- Condition: ruins

Location
- Location within Croatia

Site history
- Built: 13th century
- Materials: limestone

Budački (pronounced [budaːt͡ʃki]) or Gorica (pronounced [gorìt͡sa]) is a ruined castle on the left bank of the river Rijeka, which flows into the Radonja, a tributary of the Korana. It had a rectangular floorplan, and every corner had its own tower, making it one of the stronger fortifications of the region.

== History ==
In medieval times, there lived in the Gorica county an eponymous noble clan, "od Gorice". The county included the areas around the Kupa and Mrežnica by Karlovac to those around the Korana by Veljun and east beneath Petrova Gora by Vojnić. Most members of that clan were small landed nobility, but at the core were a number of feudal lords with more possessions. The largest belonged to these houses: Banski or Novakovići around Banšćina and Velemerić, Barilovići on the Korana, Dragačići in Trebinja and Otok and Mrzlo Polje, Ivkovići in Peć and Duga Resa, Oršići in Dol and Orehovac and Lipovac (Generalski Stol), Zimići in Zimić near Budački, Tomašići in Belaj, Radinovići in Babina gora, and Tušilovići in Tušilović. The main house among them were the lords of Gorica, which was in the 16th century called Budački, after the old Lika family of the same name, located in today's Donji Budački in the Vojnić township. Although the castle Steničnjak has also been proposed for the identity of Gorica, there is much support for Budački.

=== Budački family ===
The Budački family came from Lika, in flight from the Ottoman Turkish Army, to the region at the end of the 15th century, together with many other families, among which were the Herendići from Bužim in Lika, the Stančići from Obrovac on the Una, the Biševići from Šibenik, the Mišljenovići from Kamičac, and the Darovići from Knin. Assuming the tradition that derives the Budački family from the castle Budak, they would have lost their original castle to the Turks when they conquered Lika in 1536, receiving in exchange the castle Buća (near Gornji and Donji Viduševac) from the Topusko Abbacy.

=== Hungarian–Ottoman Wars ===
During the Hungarian–Ottoman Wars, this castle formed along with Barilović and Zvečaj an important node in the Hungarian defense network. Under Juraj Ivanov Budački, the conditions that caused the castle Budački were created in 1575 by the army of Ferhad Pasha Sokolović following a battle recorded in greatest detail in a document written by general Kissel and kept in the Provincial Archive of Styria, (Note: Miscellanea f. 69 No. 18) taking place not far away in Radonja that saw the death of Herbard VIII von Auersperg,

The first attempt to take Budački itself came on 11 January 1578 by 800 Turks but was unsuccessful. It was followed by a second unsuccessful attempt to take it while dressed as women in July 1581. In 1585, the town of Budački was burned. After the fall of Bihać, Juraj Ivanov held out for four more years until, after leaving to purchase food and ammunition, the Turks took it without resistance in 1596, although the memory of its unusually long defense would live on. This left Barilović on the front line.

The castle was repaired in 1686 under Karlovac general Matija Strassoldo. A lithograph published the same year by Valvasor showed it to already be in excellent condition, and in 1699 the military engineer F. Hollstein sketched its floorplan, reproduced in 1701. At this time, captain Franjo Oršić settled about 120 Vlach families from Kladuša and its environs in and around Budački (i.e. Gornji Budački, Donji Budački, Budačka Rijeka). In 1688, Budački was guarded by vojvoda Todor. An estimated 300 Vlach soldiers served under the vojvoda of Budački in 1701.

=== Repurposing and destruction ===
The final sketches to be made of the castle while it was still standing were made in 1746 by J. A. Schillinger and around 1790 by A. Schernding. The 1790 floorplan shows that the entrance staircase shifted from the F tower to the castellan's tower. The ground floor at the time included a pen, a servants' room, and firewood storage; the first floor included three rooms, a kitchen, and a bathroom; the second floor consisted of rooms for the castellan. The castle stood until the beginning of the 19th century, under the command of the Budački division of the Slunj regiment of the Austrian Military Frontier, but then the regional government gave the order for it to be destroyed in 1845. When Ivan Kukuljević Sakcinski passed through the area, he noted that the stones from the castle had been used to construct officers' houses. Practically nothing remains of the castle except for some trenches formed by the foundations.

== Budački family tree ==
This is the family tree of the House of Budački, part of the Croatian nobility in the Middle Ages, which died out as such in 1707. Following the loss of Budački, they lived exclusively in Šišljavić and the properties in Jeđudovec and Đurđekovec granted to them in 1579 by emperor Rudolf II in 1579. Yet another property in Donja Stubica was given to Juraj Ivanov by baron Juraj I Ratkaj in 1598.

Juraj of Buča i Gorica, (mentioned 1484)
Bartol	Nikola, cleric of Zagreb, archdeacon of Vaška (mentioned 1490)	Petar	daughter (married Nikola Špišić in 1520)
Ivan, 1. wife Peregrina, daughter of Juraj Benković of Plavno (1549); 2. wife Barbara Barilović, later married captain Anton Gerec (1564)	Bartol	Ana widow of Stjepan Mišljenović of Kamičac (1559)
Juraj Ivanov, wife Katarina	Kata, wife of Ivan Herendić; Lipnički (1559)	Jelena wife of Ivan Berislavić
Janko, governor of Vinodol, 1609-1622, wife Žuža Mrnjavčić
Dorotea, husband Petar Vojnović, widow in 1638	Juraj	Petar, wife baroness Weneg	Nikola, wife Katarina Plepelić (married 1672), Ivan Jurmanović's widow
Baltazar	Aleksandar (†1694), wife Ana Roz., baroness Tchetschker	Janko (†1707), wife Ana Mar. Karić
Ana, husband Adam Iljašić	Klara, husband Juraj Cinderij (married 1754)

== Bibliography ==
- Lopašić, Radoslav (1883). Uspomena na put u Slunjsku krajinu 1865. godine. Zagreb.
- Kruhek, Milan (1976). Stari gradovi između Kupe i Korane [Old Castles Between the Kupa and the Korana] (PDF) (in Croatian).
- Kruhek, Milan (1993). Graditeljska baština karlovačkog Pokuplja. Karlovac: Matica hrvatska.
- Majetić, Goran (1995-07-24). "Budački grad". Večernji list. ISSN 0350-5006.
- Kruhek, Milan (1995). Karlovac – utvrde, granice i ljudi. Karlovac: Matica hrvatska.
- Mrak, Borna (2021-12-15) [defended 2021-10-18]. Turistička valorizacija starih gradova i kaštela u Karlovačkoj županiji (Thesis).
