= Novo Selo Glinsko massacre =

Mass murder of Croat civilians, 1991

- Part of the Croatian War of Independence
- Novo Selo Glinsko on the map of Croatia, JNA/SAO Krajina-held areas in late 1991 are highlighted in red
- Location: 45.3716399°N 16.1779308°E; Novo Selo Glinsko, Croatia
- Date: 3 and 16 October 1991
- Target: Croats
- Attack type: Mass killing
- Deaths: 32
- Perpetrator: SAO Krajina forces

The Novo Selo Glinsko massacre was the mass murder of Croat civilians in two separate massacres committed by Serb forces on 3 and 16 October 1991 in the village of Novo Selo Glinsko, near the town of Glina.

== Background ==
Fighting in the area of Glina and the wider area, between Croat and SAO Krajina forces, began almost immediately after Croatia declared its independence from Yugoslavia on 26 June 1991. The first clashes began with Operation Stinger and the rebel Serb attack on the Glina police station. The conflict in the region of Banovina escalated with the 1991 Yugoslav campaign in Croatia and the region largely falling to the self-declared SAO Krajina by the autumn of 1991. During this time, several Croat towns and villages were attacked, occupied and ethnically cleansed of their non-Serb populations.

== Killings ==
On 3 October 1991, SAO Krajina paramilitary and territorial defense forces entered the village and committed their first massacre of the Croat inhabitants, killing 9 Croat civilians. Serb forces returned shortly after on the 16 October 1991 to kill the remaining Croat inhabitants. The men and women were separated before being killed; the men were shot and the women were locked in the basement of a wooden house that was then fired upon and destroyed with a M80 Zolja rocket launcher, killing those inside. After the massacre, Serb forces burned and looted Croat homes.

The victims included 15 men and 17 women between 15 and 83 years of age, the youngest victim of the massacre was 15-year old Katica Šimanović.

In 2015, Zagreb County State's Attorney's Office opened an investigation into the massacre, four members of the Serb Glina Territorial Defence have so far been arrested by Croatian authorities.
