= Božidar Širola =

Dr. Božidar Širola (1889 in Žakanje – 1956 in Zagreb) was a Croatian composer, organologist, musicologist, ethnomusicologist, and museum administrator. He is known as a composer of almost all musical forms in classical music.

== Compositions ==
- V protuletju: pet stavaka za sopran i gudački kvartet op. E.5
- 24 dvoglasne invencije u svim dur i mol premetima za klavir (24 two part inventions in all major and minor keys for piano)
- Suita iz "Šume Striborove" for piano
- Düsseldorfer Foxtrott (Text: Peter Korfmacher) (22.VI.1955)
- Koncertni andante, op. D 24
- Plavo more - tango
- Žudnja : (sopran i klavir) (12.II.1947)

=== Oratorios ===
- Zrtva Abrahamova (Abraham's Sacrifice)(1924)
- Zivot, i spomen slavnih ucitelja sv. brace Cirila i Metoda, apostola slavenskih (The Lives and Memory of the Glorious Teachers and Brothers, Saints Cyril and Methodius, Apostles to the Slavs - oratorio)(1927)
- Posljednja pricest sv. Jeronima (The Last Communion of St. Jerome)(1928)
- Muka i smrt Kristuseva (The Passion and Death of Christ)(1928)
- Seljak (The Peasant)(1931)

=== Piano sonatas ===
- IX. sonata za klavir f-mol (25-IX-1955)
- VIII. sonata za klavir F-dur (Zagreb 1954)
- VII. sonata za klavir d-mol (Zagreb 1954)
- VI. sonata : za klavir : C-dur (Zagreb 1951; 13.XI.1951)
- V. sonata : za klavir : B-dur (Zagreb 1951)
- IV. sonata : za klavir : As-dur (Zagreb 1951; 19.X.1951)
- III. sonata : za klavir : cis-mol (Zagreb 1951; 2.X.1951)
- II. sonata : za klavir : G-dur (Zagreb 1951; 26.IX.1951)
- Sonata E-dur (Zagreb 1945. Izrađeno po staroj skici; 22.VI.1945)

=== Violin sonatas ===
- II. sonata za violinu i klavir : F-dur (Lovran, 1955)
- Sonata za violinu i klavir D-dur (Lovran, 28.VIII.1952 u podne)

=== String quartets ===
- XIII. gudački kvartet A-dur (Zagreb 1955; 30.XI.1955)
- XII. gudački kvartet f-mol (Lovran 1955; 2.VIII.1955)
- XI. gudački kvartet A-dur (Zagreb 1955; 9.VI.1955)
- X. gudački kvartet F-dur (Little) (Zagreb 1955; 25.V.1955)
- IX. gudački kvartet G-dur (Nizozemski) (Posvećeno dru. Jaapu Kunstu, Zagreb 1953)
- VII. gudački kvartet h-mol (Opatija - Zagreb 1951; 15.IX.1951. Zagreb)
- VI. gudački kvartet A-dur (Zagreb 1951; 20.IX.1951)
- V. gudački kvartet g-mol (Zagreb 1951; 28.VII.1951)

=== Cello sonatas ===
- Sonata za violoncello i klavir C-dur (Zagreb 1952)
