= Gora, Croatia =

Coordinates: 45°25′07″N 16°11′32″E

Gora
- Village
- Interactive map of Gora
- Country: Croatia
- Region: Continental Croatia (Banovina)
- County: Sisak-Moslavina
- Municipality: Petrinja

Area
  - Total: 13.9 km^{2} (5.4 sq mi)

Population (2021)
  - Total: 232
  - Density: 16.7/km^{2} (43.2/sq mi)
- Time zone: UTC+1 (CET)
  - Summer (DST): UTC+2 (CEST)

Gora is a village in Croatia. It is connected by the D37 highway.
