= Šatornja =

- Village
- Interactive map of Šatornja
- Country: Croatia
- Region: Continental Croatia (Banovina)
- County: Sisak-Moslavina
- Municipality: Glina

Area
  - Total: 5.8 sq mi (15.0 km^{2})

Population (2021)
  - Total: 144
  - Density: 24.9/sq mi (9.60/km^{2})
- Time zone: UTC+1 (CET)
  - Summer (DST): UTC+2 (CEST)

Šatornja is a village in Croatia. It is connected by the D6 highway.
