= Gornja Bučica =

- Village
- Interactive map of Gornja Bučica
- Country: Croatia
- Region: Continental Croatia (Banovina)
- County: Sisak-Moslavina
- Municipality: Glina

Area
  - Total: 6.5 km^{2} (2.5 sq mi)

Population (2021)
  - Total: 84
  - Density: 13/km^{2} (33/sq mi)
- Time zone: UTC+1 (CET)
  - Summer (DST): UTC+2 (CEST)

Gornja Bučica is a village in Croatia.

== Religion ==
=== Roman Catholic Church of the Saint Anthony of Padua ===
Roman Catholic Church of the Saint Anthony of Padua in Gornja Bučica was constructed in 1836. In 1991, during the Croatian War of Independence the church was shelled by the forces of the self-proclaimed Republic of Serbian Krajina. The object restoration was completed after the end of war.
