= Dragotina, Croatia =

Dragotina
- Village
- Location of Dragotina in Croatia
- Coordinates: 45°16′08″N 16°10′23″E
- Country: Croatia
- Region: Continental Croatia (Banovina)
- County: Sisak-Moslavina
- Municipality: Glina

Area
  - Total: 7.1 km^{2} (2.7 sq mi)

Population (2021)
  - Total: 57
  - Density: 8.0/km^{2} (21/sq mi)
- Time zone: UTC+1 (CET)
  - Summer (DST): UTC+2 (CEST)
- Postal code: 44400 Glina
- Area code: (+385) 44

Dragotina is a village in central Croatia, in the Sisak-Moslavina County, municipality of Glina. It is connected by the D6 highway.

== Demographics ==
According to the 2011 census, the village of Dragotina has 149 inhabitants. This represents 29.74% of its pre-war population according to the 1991 census.

Population by ethnicity

Year of census	total	Serbs	Croats	Yugoslavs	others
2011	149	134 (89.93%)	13 (8.72%)	n/a	2 (1.35%)
2001	182	n/a	n/a	n/a	n/a
1991	501	484 (96.61%)	10 (2.00%)	4 (0.80%)	3 (0.59%)
1981	500	394 (78.80%)	4 (0.80%)	99 (19.80%)	3 (0.60%)
1971	597	568 (95.14%)	14 (2.35%)	12 (2.01%)	3 (0.50%)

Historical population 1857-2011
v

population	680	580	641	756	860	971	955	953	685	704	635	597	500	501	182	149
	1857	1869	1880	1890	1900	1910	1921	1931	1948	1953	1961	1971	1981	1991	2001	2011

Sources: Croatian Bureau of Statistics publications

== Religion ==
=== Serbian Orthodox Church of the Dormition of the Theotokos ===
In 1760 local existing Roman Catholic church was converted to Serbian Orthodox Church as the Church of the Dormition of the Theotokos. This medieval church was removed and the new historicist building was completed in 1910. The site is known as a Roman archaeological site and some part of it are reused in the construction of the church. The church was burned by the Ustashe regime during the World War II and its reconstruction was completed in 1988. After the Operation Storm in 1995 church was devastated by the members of Croatian Army and its latest reconstruction was completed in 2000.

== Sights ==
- Monument to the Victims of Fascism - removed from the site and deposited into storage facilities in Glina based on the decision of the Glina Municipal Council dated 18 March 1997

== See also ==
- List of Glagolitic inscriptions (16th century)
