= Vanići =

Coordinates: 45°04′56″N 16°20′20″E

Vanići Ванићи (Serbian)
- Village
- Interactive map of Vanići
- Country: Croatia
- Region: Continental Croatia (Banovina)
- County: Sisak-Moslavina
- Municipality: Dvor

Area
  - Total: 0.42 sq mi (1.1 km^{2})

Population (2021)
  - Total: 50
  - Density: 120/sq mi (45/km^{2})
- Time zone: UTC+1 (CET)
  - Summer (DST): UTC+2 (CEST)

Vanići (Serbian Cyrillic: Ванићи) is a village in Croatia. It is connected by the D6 highway.
