= Grmušani =

Coordinates: 45°05′09″N 16°18′45″E

Grmušani Грмушани (Serbian)
- Village
- Interactive map of Grmušani
- Country: Croatia
- Region: Continental Croatia (Banovina)
- County: Sisak-Moslavina
- Municipality: Dvor

Area
  - Total: 1.3 sq mi (3.3 km^{2})

Population (2021)
  - Total: 57
  - Density: 45/sq mi (17/km^{2})
- Time zone: UTC+1 (CET)
  - Summer (DST): UTC+2 (CEST)

Grmušani (Serbian Cyrillic: Грмушани) is a village in Croatia. It is connected by the D6 highway.
