= Drenovac Banski =

- Village
- Location of Drenovac Banski in Croatia
- Coordinates: 45.2961°N 16.2020°E
- Country: Croatia
- Region: Continental Croatia (Banovina)
- County: Sisak-Moslavina
- Municipality: Glina

Area
  - Total: 8.6 km^{2} (3.3 sq mi)

Population (2021)
  - Total: 24
  - Density: 2.8/km^{2} (7.2/sq mi)
- Time zone: UTC+1 (CET)
  - Summer (DST): UTC+2 (CEST)
- Postal code: 44400 Glina
- Area code: (+385) 44

Drenovac Banski is a village in central Croatia, in the municipality/town of Glina, Sisak-Moslavina County.

== Demographics ==
According to the 2011 census, the village of Drenovac Banski had 74 inhabitants. This represents 16.37% of its pre-war population according to the 1991 census.

Population by ethnicity

Year of census	total	Serbs	Croats	Yugoslavs	others
2011	74	n/a	n/a	-	n/a
2001	75	n/a	n/a	-	n/a
1991	452	438 (96.90%)	7 (1.55%)	2 (0.44%)	5 (1.11%)
1981	580	571 (98.45%)	1 (0.17%)	6 (1.03%)	2 (0.35)
1971	711	709 (98.72%)	-	-	2 (0.28%)

Population change 1857-2011
v

population	766	785	748	927	1018	1068	1039	1145	901	893	799	711	580	452	75	74
	1857	1869	1880	1890	1900	1910	1921	1931	1948	1953	1961	1971	1981	1991	2001	2011

Sources: Croatian Bureau of Statistics publications

== Notable people ==
- Milan Nenadić
