= Donji Žirovac =

Coordinates: 45°09′14″N 16°07′19″E

Donji Žirovac Доњи Жировац (Serbian)
- Village
- Interactive map of Donji Žirovac
- Country: Croatia
- Region: Continental Croatia (Banovina)
- County: Sisak-Moslavina
- Municipality: Dvor

Area
  - Total: 1.0 sq mi (2.7 km^{2})

Population (2021)
  - Total: 28
  - Density: 27/sq mi (10/km^{2})
- Time zone: UTC+1 (CET)
  - Summer (DST): UTC+2 (CEST)

Donji Žirovac (Serbian Cyrillic: Доњи Жировац) is a village in Croatia. It is connected by the D6 highway. The village has 53 residents according to 2001 census, most of whom are of the Serbian ethnicity.

== Religion ==
=== Serbian Orthodox Church of St. Peter and Paul ===
Donji Žirovac is famous for its Serbian Orthodox Church of St. Peter and Paul built between 1822 and 1830. During the World War II the church served as a Yugoslav Partisans workshop and basis. It led German forces to bomb in 1943 and it was not is permanent use in the subsequent period until today. Despite its state the church is still occasionally used by the local Serbian Orthodox community. There was an older wooden church in for the wider area of the village which was most probably constructed in 1693. Construction of the contemporary orthodox church was state funded.
