= Novo Selište =

Coordinates: 45°26′N 16°14′E

- Village
- Interactive map of Novo Selište
- Country: Croatia
- Region: Continental Croatia (Banovina)
- County: Sisak-Moslavina
- Municipality: Petrinja

Area
  - Total: 3.4 km^{2} (1.3 sq mi)

Population (2021)
  - Total: 279
  - Density: 82/km^{2} (210/sq mi)
- Time zone: UTC+1 (CET)
  - Summer (DST): UTC+2 (CEST)

Novo Selište is a village in Croatia. It is connected by the D37 highway.
