= Veliki Gradac =

- Village
- Location in Croatia
- Coordinates: 45°17′01″N 16°15′42″E
- Country: Croatia
- Region: Continental Croatia (Banovina)
- County: Sisak-Moslavina
- Municipality: Glina

Area
  - Total: 16.2 km^{2} (6.3 sq mi)
- Elevation: 265 m (869 ft)

Population (2021)
  - Total: 80
  - Density: 4.9/km^{2} (13/sq mi)
- Time zone: UTC+1 (CET)
  - Summer (DST): UTC+2 (CEST)
- Postal code: 44400
- Area code: (+385) 44

Veliki Gradac is a village in central Croatia, in the municipality/town of Glina, Sisak-Moslavina County.

== Demographics ==
According to the 2011 census, the village of Veliki Gradac has 126 inhabitants, many of whom are elderly. This represents 17.80% of its pre-war population according to the 1991 census.

Population by ethnicity

Year of census	total	Serbs	Croats	Yugoslavs	others
2011	126	122 (96.83%)	-	-	4 (3.17%)
2001	123	n/a	n/a	-	n/a
1991	708	683 (96.48%)	3 (0.42%)	3 (0.42%)	19 (2.68%)
1981	762	708 (92.91%)	3 (0.39%)	38 (4.99%)	13 (1.71%)
1971	879	864 (98.29%)	-	14 (1.48%)	1 (0.23%)

Historical population 1857-2011
v

population	819	768	816	1021	1098	1155	1189	1257	1052	1034	986	879	762	708	123	126
	1857	1869	1880	1890	1900	1910	1921	1931	1948	1953	1961	1971	1981	1991	2001	2011

Sources: Croatian Bureau of Statistics publications
