= Donje Taborište =

Coordinates: 45°27′N 16°01′E

- Village
- Interactive map of Donje Taborište
- Country: Croatia
- Region: Continental Croatia (Banovina)
- County: Sisak-Moslavina
- Municipality: Glina

Area
  - Total: 0.93 sq mi (2.4 km^{2})

Population (2021)
  - Total: 28
  - Density: 30/sq mi (12/km^{2})
- Time zone: UTC+1 (CET)
  - Summer (DST): UTC+2 (CEST)

Donje Taborište is a village in Croatia. It is connected by the D1 highway.
