= Kihalac =

- Village
- Interactive map of Kihalac
- Country: Croatia
- Region: Continental Croatia (Banovina)
- County: Sisak-Moslavina
- Municipality: Glina

Area
  - Total: 1.4 km^{2} (0.54 sq mi)

Population (2021)
  - Total: 44
  - Density: 31/km^{2} (81/sq mi)
- Time zone: UTC+1 (CET)
  - Summer (DST): UTC+2 (CEST)

Kihalac is a village in Croatia. It is connected by the D37 highway.

According to the 2001 census, the settlement had 62 inhabitants and 21 family households.
