= Dvorišće =

Dvorišće may refer to:

- Dvorišće, Sisak-Moslavina County, a village near Glina
- Dvorišće, Zagreb County, a village near Rakovec
