= Buzeta =

Buzeta may refer to:

- Buzeta, Croatia, a village near the town of Glina
- Buzeta (river), a tributary of the river Glina
- Fernando Buzeta (1921–1987), a Chilean politician
