= Mošćenica =

Coordinates: 45°26′22″N 16°21′19″E

- Village
- Interactive map of Mošćenica
- Country: Croatia
- Region: Continental Croatia (Banovina)
- County: Sisak-Moslavina
- Municipality: Petrinja

Area
  - Total: 1.9 sq mi (4.9 km^{2})

Population (2021)
  - Total: 2,096
  - Density: 1,100/sq mi (430/km^{2})
- Time zone: UTC+1 (CET)
  - Summer (DST): UTC+2 (CEST)

Mošćenica is a village in Croatia, administratively located in the Town of Petrinja. It is connected by the D37 state road.
