= Zaloj =

- Village
- Interactive map of Zaloj
- Country: Croatia
- Region: Continental Croatia (Banovina)
- County: Sisak-Moslavina
- Municipality: Glina

Area
  - Total: 8.1 km^{2} (3.1 sq mi)

Population (2021)
  - Total: 18
  - Density: 2.2/km^{2} (5.8/sq mi)
- Time zone: UTC+1 (CET)
  - Summer (DST): UTC+2 (CEST)

Zaloj is a village in Croatia. It is within the Sisak-Moslavina County.
