= Jarnevići =

- Village
- Interactive map of Jarnevići
- Location within Croatia
- Coordinates: 45°33′N 15°22′E
- Country: Croatia

Area
  - Total: 1.4 sq mi (3.7 km^{2})

Population (2021)
  - Total: 25
  - Density: 17/sq mi (6.8/km^{2})
- Time zone: UTC+1 (CET)
  - Summer (DST): UTC+2 (CEST)

Jarnevići is a village in Croatia. It is connected by the D6 highway.
