= Donje Stative =

Coordinates: 45°31′N 15°28′E

- Village
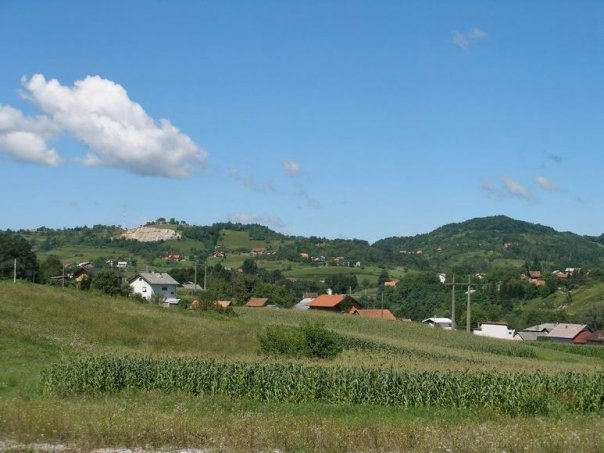
- Interactive map of Donje Stative
- Country: Croatia
- County: Karlovac County

Area
  - Total: 3.1 km^{2} (1.2 sq mi)

Population (2021)
  - Total: 191
  - Density: 62/km^{2} (160/sq mi)
- Time zone: UTC+1 (CET)
  - Summer (DST): UTC+2 (CEST)

Donje Stative is a village in Croatia. It is connected by the D6 highway.
