= Vlahović, Croatia =

Vlahović
- Village
- Location of Vlahović in Croatia
- Coordinates: 45°18′N 16°11′E
- Country: Croatia
- Region: Continental Croatia (Banovina)
- County: Sisak-Moslavina
- Municipality: Glina

Area
  - Total: 6.4 km^{2} (2.5 sq mi)
- Elevation: 165 m (541 ft)

Population (2021)
  - Total: 43
  - Density: 6.7/km^{2} (17/sq mi)
- Time zone: UTC+1 (CET)
  - Summer (DST): UTC+2 (CEST)
- Postal code: 44 406 Vlahović
- Area code: (+385) 44

Vlahović is a village in central Croatia, in the municipality of Glina, Sisak-Moslavina County.

== Demographics ==
According to the 2011 census, the village of Vlahović had 73 inhabitants. This represents 25.35% of its pre-war population according to the 1991 census.

The 1991 census recorded that 99.31% of the village population were ethnic Serbs (286/288), and 0.69% were Yugoslavs (2/288).

Historical population 1857-2011
v

population	520	572	595	771	807	802	740	800	512	540	534	448	358	288	106	73
	1857	1869	1880	1890	1900	1910	1921	1931	1948	1953	1961	1971	1981	1991	2001	2011

Sources: Croatian Bureau of Statistics publications

== Notable natives and residents ==
- Vasilj Gaćeša (1906–1942) - antifascist, partisan and People's Hero of Yugoslavia
- Nikola Demonja (1919–1944) - antifascist, partisan and People's Hero of Yugoslavia
