= Slavko Hirsch =

Croatian physician (1893–1942)

Dr. Slavko Hirsch
- Born: 29 March 1893; Glina, Kingdom of Croatia-Slavonia, Austria-Hungary
- Died: 1942 (aged 49); Jasenovac, Independent State of Croatia
- Cause of death: Murdered in Holocaust
- Spouse: Josefine (Sefi) Roubitschek
- Children: Ruth Hirsch
- Parents: Bertold Hirsch (father); Josefina Hirsch (mother)

Dr. Slavko Hirsch (29 March 1893 – 1942) was a Croatian physician, founder and director of the Epidemiological Institute in Osijek.

Hirsch was born on 29 March 1893 in Glina to a Jewish family of Bertold and Josefina Hirsch. After high school education Hirsch studied medicine at the Medical University of Vienna, Innsbruck Medical University and University of Prague. During World War I, as a student, he was recruited and mobilized in the Austro-Hungarian Army. He was stationed in the village Bršadin, near Vukovar. During the war, Hirsch gained extensive experience in the field of venerology and other communicable diseases. In 1919, he finished specialization at the Rudolf Virchow Hospital in Berlin, where he studied epidemiology of bacterial meningitis. In 1923, Hirsch was appointed as head of the newly founded Community health center Osijek and head of the infectious diseases department at the Osijek Hospital. Hirsch was also named, in 1924, director of the Epidemiological Institute Osijek which he founded. His great merit was in combating infectious diseases, not only in the Osijek area but also in the wider Slavonia region. During World War II, physician Miroslav Schlesinger organized the departure of the Croatian Jewish doctors to Bosnia to combat endemic syphilis in 1941. Eighty Jewish doctors were sent to Bosnia by Independent State of Croatia authorities, as a Jew among them was Hirsch. Most of those doctors would later flee to join the Partisans. Hirsch was married to Josefine (née Roubitschek), with whom he had a daughter Ruth. In 1942 Hirsch was deported from Derventa to Jasenovac concentration camp where he was killed together with his wife, daughter, granddaughter and sister.

== Bibliography ==
- Živaković-Kerže, Zlata (2005). Židovi u Osijeku (1918.-1941.). Osijek: Židovska općina Osijek – Tiskara Pauk d.o.o., Cerna. ISBN 953-6659-22-0.
