= Herbard VIII von Auersperg =

General and governor of Carniola (1528–1575)

Herbard VIII von Auersperg, Freiherr from 1550, Slovenized as Hervard Turjaški (15 June 1528 in Vienna – 22 September 1575 near Budački on the Military Frontier) was a governor of Carniola supporting Protestantism, and an imperial Habsburg general in the wars against the Ottoman Empire.

== Life and career ==
Herbard von Auersperg was born into the House of Auersperg, one of the oldest Austrian families at the time when the spreading of Lutheranism was at its fastest, and the danger of the Turkish invasion into the Habsburg lands at its greatest.

Herbard's father was Trojan von Auersperg, his mother Anna a Freiin (i.e. baroness) von Egck. After attending the municipal school in Vienna he was sent for several years to the court of Cleve which was among the many European relations of the Auerspergs. 1546 he started on his successful military career under Ivan Lenković at the "Windic" border (Upper Slavonian Krajina) and after only two years, hardly 20 years old, was made Captain of the strategically important Uskok centre of Zengg/Senj on the coast of Dalmatia in 1548, and in March 1550 he was made a baron (“Freiherr”).

Herbard did have his failures. A major failure, resulting from a lack of courage, happened in 1565 after the new grand vizier Sokolović ordered his nephew, the governor of Bosnia, Mustafa Sokolović, to attack Croatia. Mustafa attacked Krupa but due to the heroic 16 day defense of Krupa by the Croatian garrison Mustafa ran out of gunpowder and lead. While Mustafa sent for resupply from Banja Luka, Ausperger with Croatian viceroy Erdődy, prince Slunjski and Peter Farkasić arrived on the west bank of the Una with 7,000 soldiers. Only the Una River separated Auersperg's troop and Mustafa. Everyone knew that time was running out before resupply arrived but Auersperger did nothing because he was afraid of the superior numbers of the Turks. Slunjski and Farkasić saw that they had to act and asked Auersperger to give them 1,000 cavalry and 1,000 infantry soldiers with whom they would cross the Una and attack the enemy, Auersperger did not approve this because he was afraid his army would be lost to the superior numbers of the enemy. Another request was made and again denied. Farkasić and Slunjski then decided to go on their own with their own soldiers but even that Auersperg refused. Mustafa received new supplies and made one more assault, greater than any previous, took the fortress and slaughtered everyone.

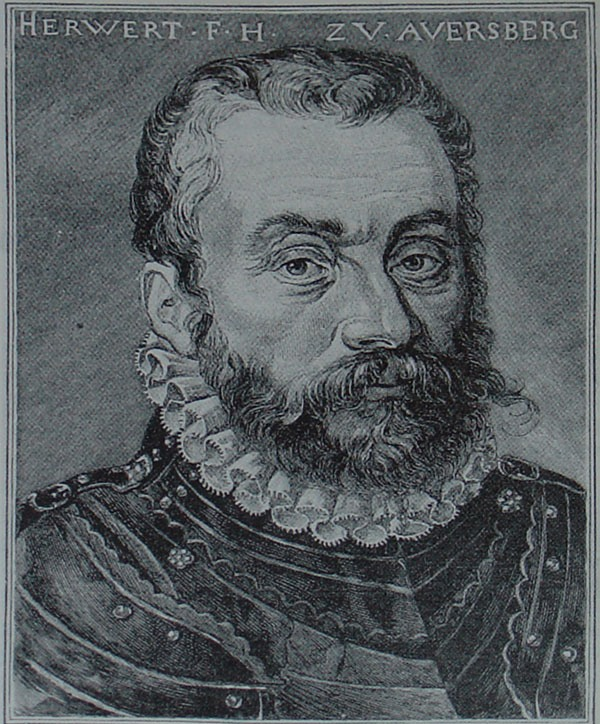

Owing to his bravery and highly successful performance in the battle near Novi Grad (1566) on the Una river he was appointed "Landeshauptmann" (lit. "state captain", i.e. governor) of the Duchy of Carniola (1566–75), with his home at Auersperg Castle.

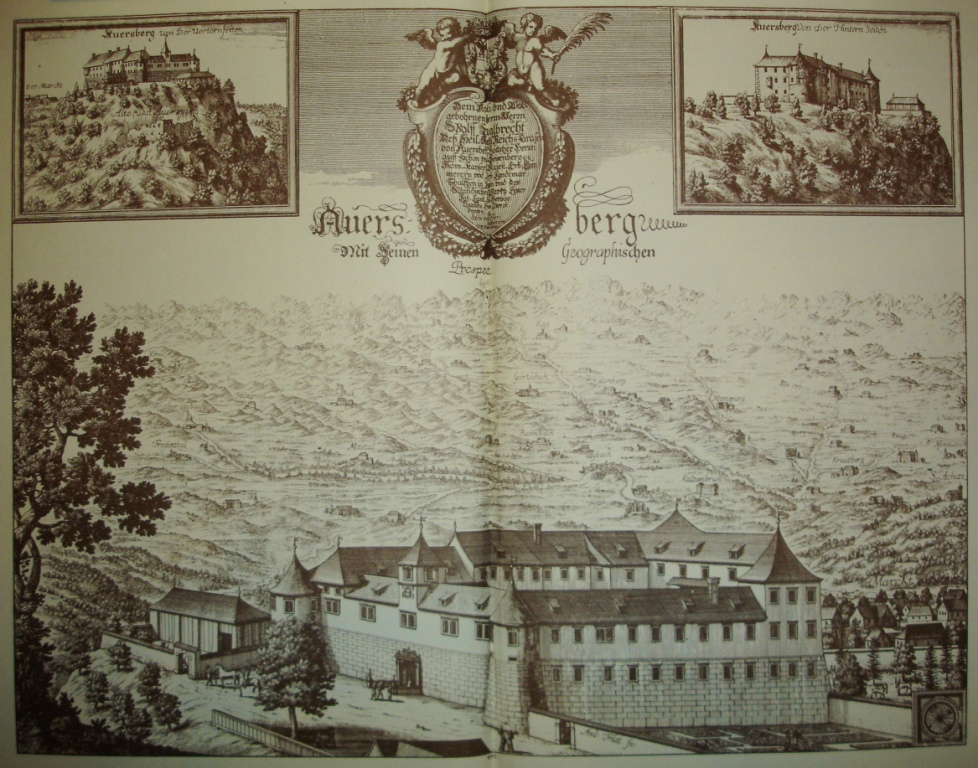
Auersberg Castle, Valvasor 1689

As a fervent follower of Luther's teaching Auersperg as governor favoured Protestant teaching in Carniola, befriended and was host to the great reformer Primož Trubar and, through his son Christoph von Auersperg, offered sanctuary at Auersperg/Turjak castle to the first translator of the bible into the local language, Jurij Dalmatin. As a renowned pillar of Protestantism Herbard von Auersperg thus opposed strongly the counter-reformatory measures of the Inner-Austrian Court in Graz and resisted the Catholic clerics in Carniola, who were mostly strangers to the land.

1560-63 Auersperg was charged with the responsibility for the defence of the Croat-Ottoman border and the Adriatic coastline, and 1565-69 for the Slovenian borderlands. Following the death of Lenković (1569) he rose to general in charge of all the Austrian Military Frontier area in the south-east, but lost his life in September 1575 in the battle of Budačka at the Croatian border, fighting greatly superior Turkish forces. Auersperg was beheaded and his cut-off head was jubilantly exhibited on a spear during the triumphal march of the victor Ferhat Beg in Constantinople on 9 November 1575, but later was bought from the Turks by the Auersperg family. Tradition has it that, together with what Herbard's widow paid as ransom for the release of their son Wolf Engelbrecht (or Engelbert), who had been taken captive in the same battle, it made possible the erection of the grand Ferhat Pasha Mosque in Banja Luka.

"In order to avenge Herbard von Auersperg's highly esteemed head, to which the Turks had done likewise", the severed heads of two Ottoman pashas who while fleeing had drowned in the Kupa river – Hasan Pasha, the Beylerbey of Bosnia, and Mehmet, a nephew of the Sultan and the Pasha of Hercegovina – were also exhibited on spears after their crushing defeat in the Sisak brought about by Herbard's cousin, Andreas von Auersperg, so Valvasor reports.

== Bibliography ==
- Metnitz, Gustav Adolf, Auersperg, Herbard VIII. Freiherr, in: Neue Deutsche Biographie 1 (1953), p. 437 (online, German)
- Peter von Radics, Herbard VIII., Freiherr zu Auersperg 1528–1575, Vienna, Wilhelm Braumüller, 1862( online, German)
- Franz Krones,Auersperg: Herbard VIII. (X.), in: Allgemeine Deutsche Biographie, Leipzig 1875, vol. 1: Van der Aa - Baldamus, p. 639 (online, German)
- Polona Šega, Turjak skozi čas, Turjak Turistično društvo, Turjak 1990, ISBN 86-900991-1-5 (Slovene)
- Georg Khisl zu Kaltenbrunn, Herbard Freiherr zu Auerspergs wahrhafftige Thaten, Laibach 1576
- Herbard von Auersperg, in: Carniola, Vaterländische Zeitschrift, Laibach 1839/40, Nr. 94 - 97
