= Buzeta, Croatia =

Buzeta
- Village
- Interactive map of Buzeta
- Location of Buzeta in Croatia
- Coordinates: 45°15′47″N 16°06′34″E
- Country: Croatia
- Region: Continental Croatia (Banovina)
- County: Sisak-Moslavina
- Municipality: Glina

Area
  - Total: 18.1 km^{2} (7.0 sq mi)
- Elevation: 161 m (528 ft)

Population (2021)
  - Total: 50
  - Density: 2.8/km^{2} (7.2/sq mi)
- Time zone: UTC+1 (CET)
  - Summer (DST): UTC+2 (CEST)
- Postal code: 44400
- Area code: (+385) 44

Buzeta is a village in central Croatia, in the municipality of Glina, Sisak-Moslavina County. The village is located on the border with Bosnia and Herzegovina. Buzeta is located at 156 meters above sea level and covers an area of 18.82 km^{2}.

== History ==
The settlement of Buzeta was first mentioned in 1563. Around year 1600, the village was inhabited by Christian settlers of Eastern Orthodox faith.

== Culture ==
The wooden Eastern Orthodox church, dedicated to St. Elijah, was built around 1720 in a location further into the forest, only to be transferred to its present location in 1740. Major renovation work on the church was undertaken in 1849, the year carved under the conical roof of the shingle on the belfry. Iconostasis, which existed in the church of St. Elijah until 1995, was transferred from the church in Hajtić in the 19th century. The church was damaged in World War II. Its post-war reconstruction, supervised by the Conservation Institute in Zagreb, included restoration of the church foundations. The icons in the church included the icon of Saint Dimitry dating back to 1810, and icons of St. George and St. Eliah. The church of St. Elijah, which in many respects is the most valuable wooden Eastern Orthodox church in the region of Banija, was set on fire during the Croatian military operation Storm in early August 1995. According to the witness accounts, the church was burt down by the members of the Army of Bosnia and Herzegovina.

== Demographics ==
According to the 2011 census, the village of Buzeta had 67 inhabitants. This represents 17.80% of its pre-war population according to the 1991 census.

Population by ethnicity

Year of census	total	Serbs	Croats	Yugoslavs	others
2011	67	n/a	n/a	-	n/a
2001	60	n/a	n/a	-	n/a
1991	390	385 (98.72%)	2 (0.51%)	2 (0.51%)	1 (0.26%)
1981	474	438 (92.41%)	1 (0.21%)	24 (5.06%)	11 (2.32%)
1971	665	653 (98.20%)	3 (0.45%)	7 (1.05%)	2 (0.30%)
1961	816	812 (99.50%)	2 (0.25%)	-	2 (0.25%)

Population change 1857-2011
v

population	663	802	813	900	983	956	970	1043	949	930	816	665	474	390	60	67
	1857	1869	1880	1890	1900	1910	1921	1931	1948	1953	1961	1971	1981	1991	2001	2011

Sources: Croatian Bureau of Statistics publications

Note: Data for years 1890 and 1900 includes data for former settlements of Donja Buzeta and Gornja Buzeta.
