= Okić (village) =

Coordinates: 45°23′N 15°40′E

- Village
- Interactive map of Okić
- Country: Croatia
- County: Karlovac County

Area
  - Total: 3.3 km^{2} (1.3 sq mi)

Population (2021)
  - Total: 43
  - Density: 13/km^{2} (34/sq mi)
- Time zone: UTC+1 (CET)
  - Summer (DST): UTC+2 (CEST)

Okić is a village in Croatia. It is connected by the D6 highway.
