= Veliki Obljaj =

- Village
- Location of Veliki Obljaj in Croatia
- Coordinates: 45°17′N 16°03′E
- Country: Croatia
- Region: Continental Croatia (Banovina)
- County: Sisak-Moslavina
- Municipality: Glina

Area
  - Total: 21.9 km^{2} (8.5 sq mi)

Population (2021)
  - Total: 9
  - Density: 0.41/km^{2} (1.1/sq mi)
- Time zone: UTC+1 (CET)
  - Summer (DST): UTC+2 (CEST)

Veliki Obljaj (Serbian: Велики Обљај) is a village which is part of the town of Glina in Banija in Croatia. It is located at the border with Bosnia and Herzegovina. Veliki Obljaj was devastated and remained largely depopulated as a consequence of the 1995 Operation Storm which resulted in complete defeat of nationalist self-proclaimed Republic of Serbian Krajina which incorporated the village. There are still local school and town hall meeting buildings which are devastated and out of function and Serbian Orthodox Church which is on rare occasions providing religious services.

There is a World War II memorial in Veliki Oblaj with the words of the Yugoslav President Josip Broz Tito from his speech in Glina in 1965 stating; "These were great sufferings, and that is why we can never get away from those days. Lika, Banija, Kordun, Krajina from those days will always come back to our memory. I advise you never to forget it. Not so that it can be your dreadful past, but that it can remind you to better value this freedom and everything what we have achieved today".
