= Mošanci =

- Village
- Location within Croatia
- Coordinates: 45.556°N 15.301°E
- Country: Croatia
- County: Karlovac County
- Municipality: Žakanje

Area
  - Total: 2.7 km^{2} (1.0 sq mi)
- Elevation: 130 m (430 ft)

Population (2021)
  - Total: 24
  - Density: 8.9/km^{2} (23/sq mi)
- Time zone: UTC+1 (CET)
  - Summer (DST): UTC+2 (CEST)
- Postal code: 47276
- Area code: (+385) 47
- Vehicle registration: KA

Mošanci is a village in Croatia, located on the border with Slovenia.

== Climate ==
A weather station exists there at an elevation of 155 metres (509 ft). The minimum recorded temperature for the winter of 2024–2025 was −8.8 °C (16.2 °F), on February 20th.

== Demographics ==
Village of Mošanci: Population trends 1857–2021
v

population	138	155	148	150	130	112	96	115	120	115	97	93	57	60	48	35	24
	1857	1869	1880	1890	1900	1910	1921	1931	1948	1953	1961	1971	1981	1991	2001	2011	2021

Sources: Croatian Bureau of Statistics publications
