= Jurovski Brod =

- Village
- Location within Croatia
- Coordinates: 45°38′05″N 15°19′22″E
- Country: Croatia
- County: Karlovac County
- Municipality: Žakanje

Area
  - Total: 0.7 km^{2} (0.27 sq mi)
- Elevation: 130 m (430 ft)

Population (2021)
  - Total: 158
  - Density: 230/km^{2} (580/sq mi)
- Time zone: UTC+1 (CET)
  - Summer (DST): UTC+2 (CEST)
- Postal code: 47276
- Area code: (+385) 47
- Vehicle registration: KA

Jurovski Brod is a village in Croatia, located on the border with Slovenia. It is connected by the D6 highway.
