= Donji Viduševac =

- Village
- Interactive map of Donji Viduševac
- Country: Croatia
- Region: Continental Croatia (Banovina)
- County: Sisak-Moslavina
- Municipality: Glina

Area
  - Total: 4.5 km^{2} (1.7 sq mi)

Population (2021)
  - Total: 141
  - Density: 31/km^{2} (81/sq mi)
- Time zone: UTC+1 (CET)
  - Summer (DST): UTC+2 (CEST)

Donji Viduševac is a village in Croatia.

== Religion ==
=== Roman Catholic Chapel of Jesus' Heart ===
Roman Catholic Chapel of Jesus' Heart was heavily damaged in 1991 during the Croatian War of Independence. It was entirely reconstructed only after the end of war.
