= Žakanje =

Municipality of Croatia

- Interactive map of Žakanje
- Location within Croatia
- Coordinates: 45°36′00″N 15°20′24″E
- Country: Croatia
- County: Karlovac County

Area
  - Total: 44.7 km^{2} (17.3 sq mi)

Population (2021)
  - Total: 1,732
  - Density: 38.7/km^{2} (100/sq mi)
- Time zone: UTC+1 (CET)
  - Summer (DST): UTC+2 (CEST)
- Website: opcina-zakanje.hr

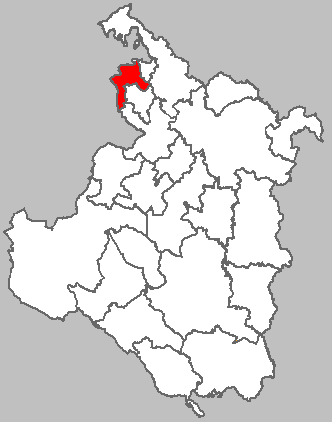
Image of Žakanje municipality within Karlovac County

Žakanje is a village and a municipality in Karlovac County, Croatia.

In the census of 2011, there were 1,889 inhabitants, in the following settlements:

- Breznik Žakanjski, population 13
- Brihovo, population 149
- Bubnjarački Brod, population 122
- Bubnjarci, population 210
- Donji Bukovac Žakanjski, population 115
- Ertić, population 16
- Gornji Bukovac Žakanjski, population 14
- Jadrići, population 7
- Jugovac, population 14
- Jurovo, population 84
- Jurovski Brod, population 182
- Kohanjac, population 96
- Mala Paka, population 26
- Mišinci, population 147
- Mošanci, population 35
- Pravutina, population 211
- Sela Žakanjska, population 68
- Sračak, population 38
- Stankovci, population 17
- Velika Paka, population 44
- Zaluka Lipnička, population 132
- Žakanje, population 149

In the 2011 census, 97.5% of the population were Croats.

Zakanje is surrounded by rolling hills, farms, orchards and vineyards. Over the last 50 years the community has expanded significantly. The town center contains a school, several restaurants, a grocery store, bank, post-office, pharmacy and a walk-in medical clinic. There are also a number of small general stores and other small businesses.

The Roman Catholic Church sits on the highest point of the village about 1 kilometer from the center. The church was built in 1896, and contains many paintings. The main road connects to Karlovac, and Metlika, Slovenia.

The oldest local surnames are Bahoric and Zdencaj.

Juraj Križanić, a Croatian missionary, was born near Žakanje.
