= Mali Erjavec =

Coordinates: 45°35′N 15°29′E

- Village
- Interactive map of Mali Erjavec
- Country: Croatia
- County: Karlovac County

Area
  - Total: 2.0 km^{2} (0.77 sq mi)

Population (2021)
  - Total: 129
  - Density: 64/km^{2} (170/sq mi)
- Time zone: UTC+1 (CET)
  - Summer (DST): UTC+2 (CEST)

Mali Erjavec is a village in Croatia.

== Bibliography ==
=== History ===
- Lopašić, Stjepan Ljuboje (1868-01-28). "Priposlano". Novi Pozor (in Croatian). Vol. 2, no. 110. p. 438. ISSN 1334-4862.
