= Gornji Viduševac =

- Village
- Interactive map of Gornji Viduševac
- Country: Croatia
- Region: Continental Croatia (Banovina)
- County: Sisak-Moslavina
- Municipality: Glina

Area
  - Total: 7.8 km^{2} (3.0 sq mi)

Population (2021)
  - Total: 373
  - Density: 48/km^{2} (120/sq mi)
- Time zone: UTC+1 (CET)
  - Summer (DST): UTC+2 (CEST)

Gornji Viduševac is a village in Croatia. It is part of Glina. It is connected by the D31 highway.
