= Dvorište, Berovo =

Dvorište / Dvorishte Двориште
- Village
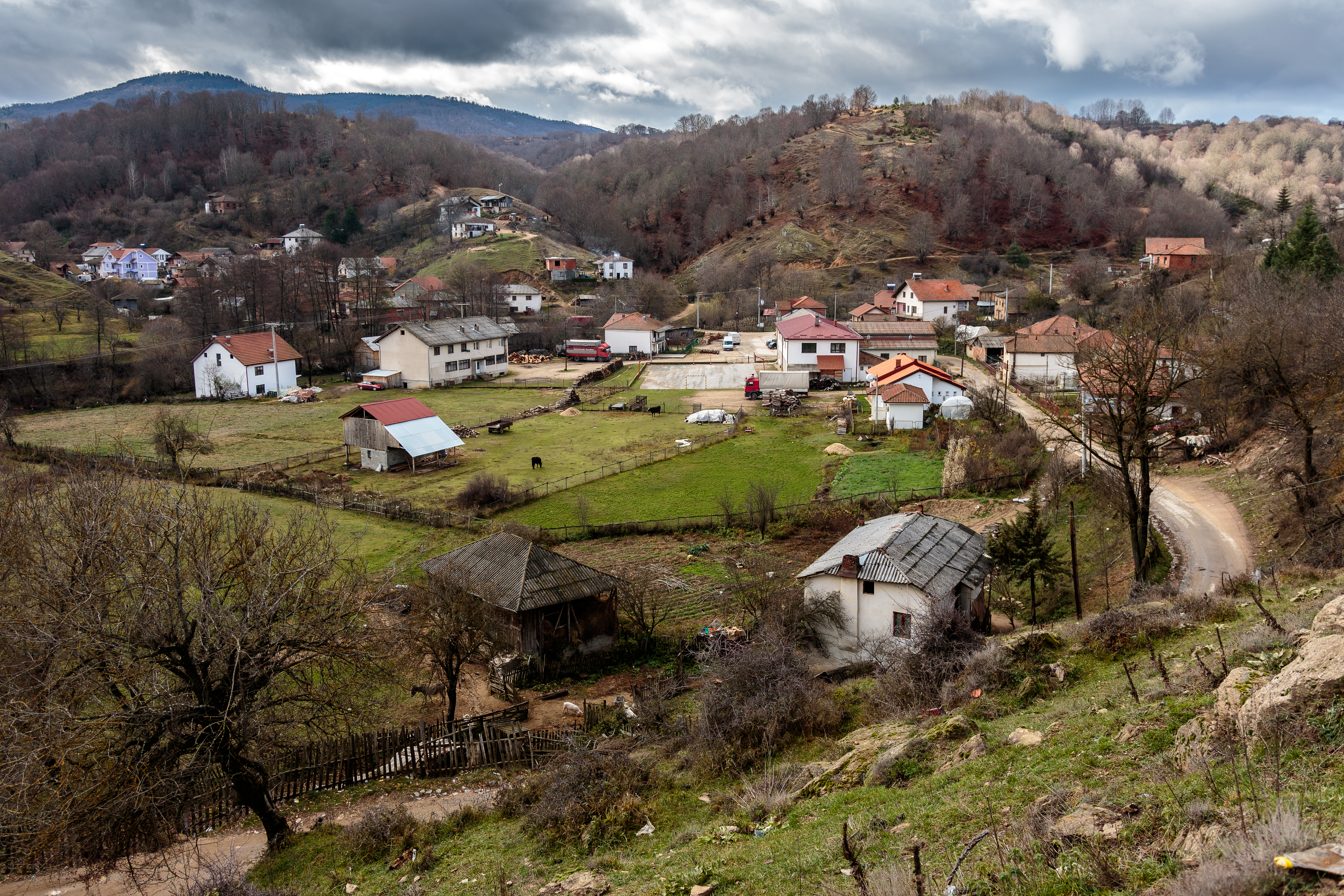

- Location within North Macedonia
- Country: North Macedonia
- Region: Eastern
- Municipality: Berovo
- Elevation: 1,015 m (3,330 ft)

Population (2002)
  - Total: 757
- Time zone: UTC+1 (CET)
- Postal code: 2330
- Area code: +389/33

Dvorište (Macedonian: Двориште) is a village located in the Berovo Municipality of North Macedonia.

== Demographics ==
According to the 2002 census, the village had a total of 757 inhabitants. Ethnic groups in the village include:

- Macedonians 757
