= Mali Gradac =

- Village
- Location of Mali Gradac in Croatia
- Coordinates: 45°16′N 16°13′E
- Country: Croatia
- Region: Continental Croatia (Banovina)
- County: Sisak-Moslavina
- Municipality: Glina

Area
  - Total: 6.6 km^{2} (2.5 sq mi)
- Elevation: 196 m (643 ft)

Population (2021)
  - Total: 73
  - Density: 11/km^{2} (29/sq mi)
- Time zone: UTC+1 (CET)
  - Summer (DST): UTC+2 (CEST)
- Postal number: 44405 Mali Gradac
- Area code: (+385) 44

Mali Gradac is a village in central Croatia, in the municipality of Glina, Sisak-Moslavina County.

== Demographics ==
According to the 2011 census, the village of Mali Gradac has 143 inhabitants. This represents 36.57% of its pre-war population according to the 1991 census.

Population by ethnicity

Year of census	total	Serbs	Croats	Yugoslavs	others
2011	143	130 (90.91%)	12 (8.39%)	-	1 (0.7%)
2001	166	n/a	n/a	-	n/a
1991	391	386 (98.72%)	-	1 (0.26%)	4 (1.02%)
1981	442	416 (94.12%)	-	20 (4.53%)	6 (1.35%)
1971	570	559 (98.07%)	3 (0.53%)	7 (1.23%)	1 (0.17%)

Historical population 1857-2011
v

population	1078	1330	1282	1553	739	878	596	820	689	680	644	570	442	391	166	143
	1857	1869	1880	1890	1900	1910	1921	1931	1948	1953	1961	1971	1981	1991	2001	2011

Sources: Croatian Bureau of Statistics publications

== Culture ==
Local branch of SKD Prosvjeta Mali Gradac.

== Sights and events ==
- Susreti na Baniji - one-day folklore festival founded in 2003 and hosted by the local branch of SKD Prosvjeta Mali Gradac. The event takes place on the last Saturday of July and brings together amateur groups nurturing traditional folk dancing and singing from different parts of Croatia, Serbia and Bosnia and Herzegovina.

== Notable people ==
- Duško Gruborović, writer and actor
- Momčilo Krković, sculptor
