= Brihovo =

Coordinates: 45°36′25″N 15°19′05″E

- Village
- Interactive map of Brihovo
- Country: Croatia
- County: Karlovac County

Area
  - Total: 2.7 km^{2} (1.0 sq mi)

Population (2021)
  - Total: 150
  - Density: 56/km^{2} (140/sq mi)
- Time zone: UTC+1 (CET)
  - Summer (DST): UTC+2 (CEST)

Brihovo is a village in Croatia.
