= Pravutina =

Coordinates: 45°36′N 15°18′E

- Village
- Interactive map of Pravutina
- Country: Croatia
- County: Karlovac County
- Municipality: Žakanje

Area
  - Total: 3.7 km^{2} (1.4 sq mi)

Population (2021)
  - Total: 208
  - Density: 56/km^{2} (150/sq mi)
- Time zone: UTC+1 (CET)
  - Summer (DST): UTC+2 (CEST)

Pravutina is a village in Croatia.
