= Vlahovići, Travnik =

Vlahovići
- Village
- Location within Bosnia and Herzegovina
- Coordinates: 44.2268262°N 17.57793°E
- Country: Bosnia and Herzegovina
- Entity: Federation of Bosnia and Herzegovina
- Canton: Central Bosnia
- Municipality: Travnik

Area
  - Total: 0.81 sq mi (2.11 km^{2})

Population (2013)
  - Total: 309
  - Density: 379/sq mi (146/km^{2})
- Time zone: UTC+1 (CET)
  - Summer (DST): UTC+2 (CEST)

Vlahovići is a village in the municipality of Travnik, Bosnia and Herzegovina.

== Demographics ==
According to the 2013 census, its population was 309.

Ethnicity in 2013
Ethnicity	Number	Percentage
Bosniaks	246	79.6%
Croats	1	0.3%
other/undeclared	62	20.1%
Total	309	100%
