= Jugovac, Serbia =

Coordinates: 43.2964°N 21.5378°E

Jugovac Југовац (Serbian)
- Village
- Interactive map of Jugovac
- Country: Serbia
- District: Toplica District
- Municipality: Prokuplje

Population (2002)
  - Total: 146
- Time zone: UTC+1 (CET)
  - Summer (DST): UTC+2 (CEST)

Jugovac is a village in the municipality of Prokuplje, Serbia. According to the 2002 census, the village has a population of 146 people.
