= Bijele Vode (Zenica) =

Bijele Vode Бијеле Воде
- Village
- Location within Bosnia and Herzegovina
- Coordinates: 44°16′56″N 17°57′57″E
- Country: Bosnia and Herzegovina
- Entity: Federation of Bosnia and Herzegovina
- Canton: Zenica-Doboj
- Municipality: Zenica

Area
  - Total: 1.79 sq mi (4.63 km^{2})

Population (2013)
  - Total: 0
  - Density: 0.0/sq mi (0.0/km^{2})
- Time zone: UTC+1 (CET)
  - Summer (DST): UTC+2 (CEST)

Bijele Vode (Cyrillic: Бијеле Воде) is a village in the City of Zenica, Bosnia and Herzegovina.

== Demographics ==
According to the 2013 census, its population was nil, down from 85 in 1991.
