= Mala Solina =

- Village
- Interactive map of Mala Solina
- Country: Croatia
- Region: Continental Croatia (Banovina)
- County: Sisak-Moslavina
- Municipality: Glina

Area
  - Total: 10.9 km^{2} (4.2 sq mi)

Population (2021)
  - Total: 9
  - Density: 0.83/km^{2} (2.1/sq mi)
- Time zone: UTC+1 (CET)
  - Summer (DST): UTC+2 (CEST)

Mala Solina (Croatian: [mȃːlaː sôlina]) is a village in Croatia.
