= Natko Devčić =

- Born: June 30, 1914; Glina, Kingdom of Croatia-Slavonia, Transleithania, Austria-Hungary
- Died: September 4, 1997 (aged 83); Zagreb, Croatia
- Education: Classical Piano and Composition, Royal Academy of Music, (1937 and 1939, respectively)

Natko Devčić (30 June 1914 – 4 September 1997) was a Croatian and Yugoslavian composer.

Devčić was born in Glina. He graduated from the Academy of Music, University of Zagreb. He died in Zagreb.

One of his better known pieces is the Istrian Suite which he wrote in 1946.
