= Bijele Vode, Croatia =

Bijele Vode
- Village
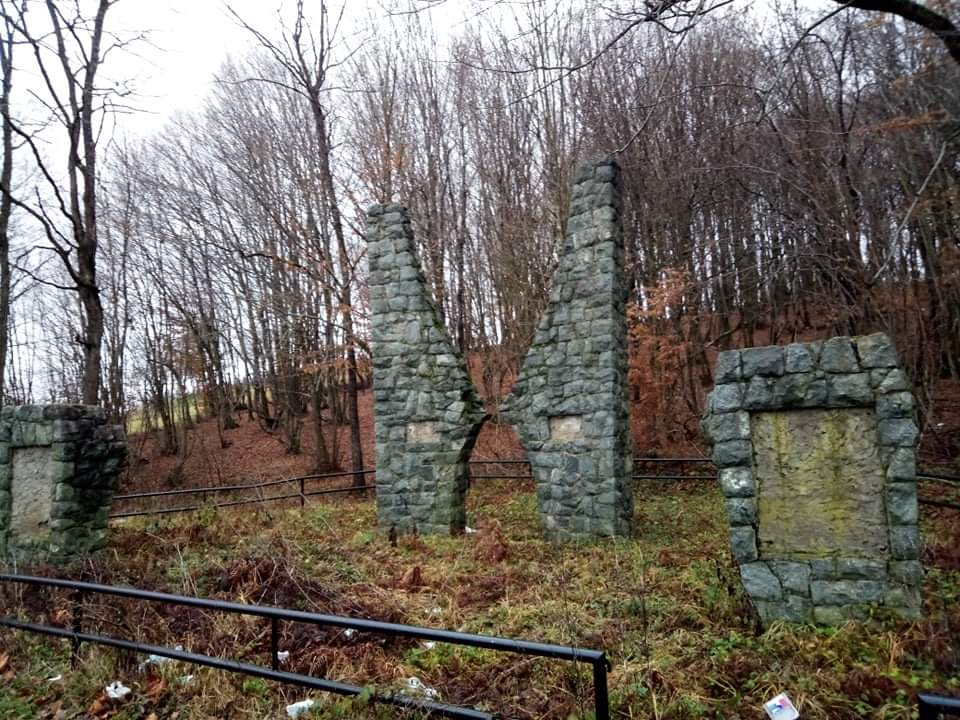
- Damaged World War II monument

- Location of Bijele Vode in Croatia
- Coordinates: 45°17′N 16°12′E
- Country: Croatia
- Region: Continental Croatia (Banovina)
- County: Sisak-Moslavina
- Municipality: Glina

Area
  - Total: 9.3 km^{2} (3.6 sq mi)

Population (2021)
  - Total: 33
  - Density: 3.5/km^{2} (9.2/sq mi)
- Time zone: UTC+1 (CET)
  - Summer (DST): UTC+2 (CEST)
- Postal code: 44 406
- Area code: (+385) 44

Bijele Vode is a village in central Croatia, in the municipality of Glina, Sisak-Moslavina County. Bijele Vode is located at 328 meters above sea level and covers an area of 9.79 km^{2}.

== Demographics ==
According to the 2011 census, the village of Bijele Vode has 67 inhabitants. This represents 18.06% of its pre-war population according to the 1991 census.

Population by ethnicity

Year of census	total	Serbs	Croats	Yugoslavs	others
2011	67	n/a	n/a	n/a	n/a
2001	61	n/a	n/a	n/a	n/a
1991	371	367 (98.92%)	2 (0.54%)	-	2 (0.54%)
1981	463	425 (91.79%)	3 (0.65%)	31 (6.70%)	4 (0.86%)
1971	637	633 (99.37%)	2 (0.31%)	-	2 (0.31%)

Historical population 1857-2011
v

population	672	702	726	801	944	1048	976	1045	825	766	728	637	463	371	61	67
	1857	1869	1880	1890	1900	1910	1921	1931	1948	1953	1961	1971	1981	1991	2001	2011

Sources: Croatian Bureau of Statistics publications
