= Hađer, Croatia =

Hađer
- Village
- Interactive map of Hađer
- Country: Croatia
- Region: Continental Croatia (Banovina)
- County: Sisak-Moslavina
- Town: Glina

Area
  - Total: 3.4 km^{2} (1.3 sq mi)

Population (2021)
  - Total: 51
  - Density: 15/km^{2} (39/sq mi)
- Time zone: UTC+1 (CET)
  - Summer (DST): UTC+2 (CEST)

Hađer is a village in Croatia. Hađer celebrates its day on June 28 in memory of the blessing of the restored chapel of Our Lady of Lourdes.

== Religion ==
=== Roman Catholic Chapel of the Our Lady of Lourdes ===
Roman Catholic Chapel of the Our Lady of Lourdes was heavily damaged in 1991 during the Croatian War of Independence. Despite requests from local population, as of 2008 it was still not reconstructed.
