= Dvorišće, Sisak-Moslavina County =

Dvorišće
- Village
- Interactive map of Dvorišće
- Location within Croatia
- Coordinates: 45°22′N 16°06′E
- Country: Croatia
- Region: Continental Croatia (Banovina)
- County: Sisak-Moslavina
- Municipality: Glina

Area
  - Total: 6.3 km^{2} (2.4 sq mi)

Population (2021)
  - Total: 75
  - Density: 12/km^{2} (31/sq mi)
- Time zone: UTC+1 (CET)
  - Summer (DST): UTC+2 (CEST)

Dvorišće is a village in Croatia. Between 1931 and 1991, it was known as Dvorište. Dvorišće is known for its numerous vineyards.

== Religion ==
The Roman Catholic chapel of Saint Anthony of Padua in Dvorišće was constructed in 1743 at the site of an earlier chapel from 1668. The building was significantly altered in the 19th century. During the Croatian War of Independence it was devastated by the Yugoslav People's Army and the Republic of Serbian Krajina forces. The reconstruction process was completed after the end of war.
