= Glina, Croatia =

Glina
- Town
- Grad Glina; Town of Glina
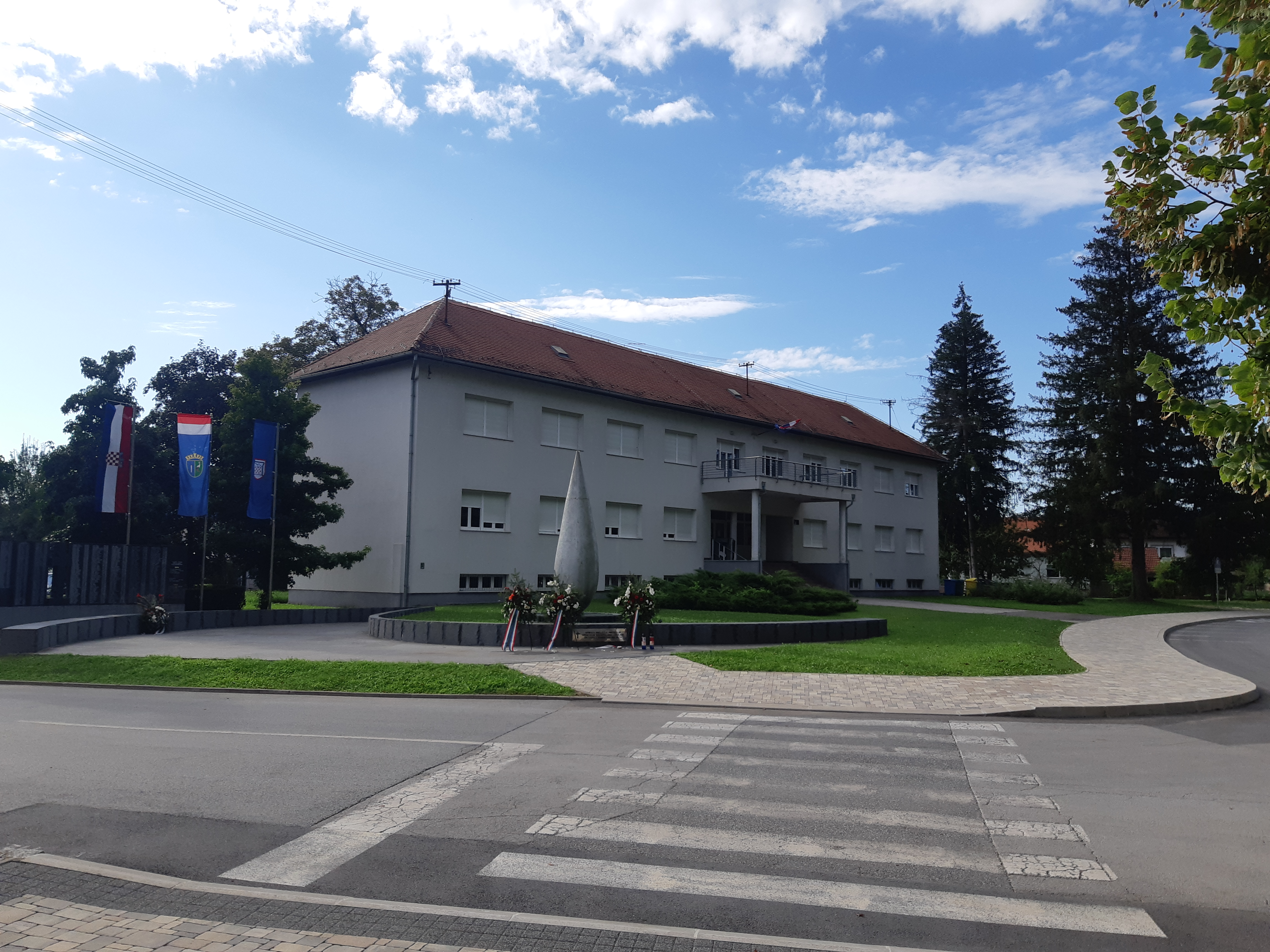
- Municipal court building in Glina
- Interactive map of Glina
- Location of Glina in Croatia
- Coordinates: 45°20′N 16°5′E
- Country: Croatia
- Region: Central Croatia (Banovina)
- County: Sisak-Moslavina County

Government
  - Mayor: Ivan Janković (Ind.)

Area
  - Town: 544.2 km^{2} (210.1 sq mi)
  - Urban: 9.3 km^{2} (3.6 sq mi)

Population (2021)
  - Town: 7,116
  - Density: 13.08/km^{2} (33.87/sq mi)
  - Urban: 4,028
  - Urban density: 430/km^{2} (1,100/sq mi)
- Time zone: UTC+1 (CET)
  - Summer (DST): UTC+2 (CEST)
- Website: grad-glina.hr

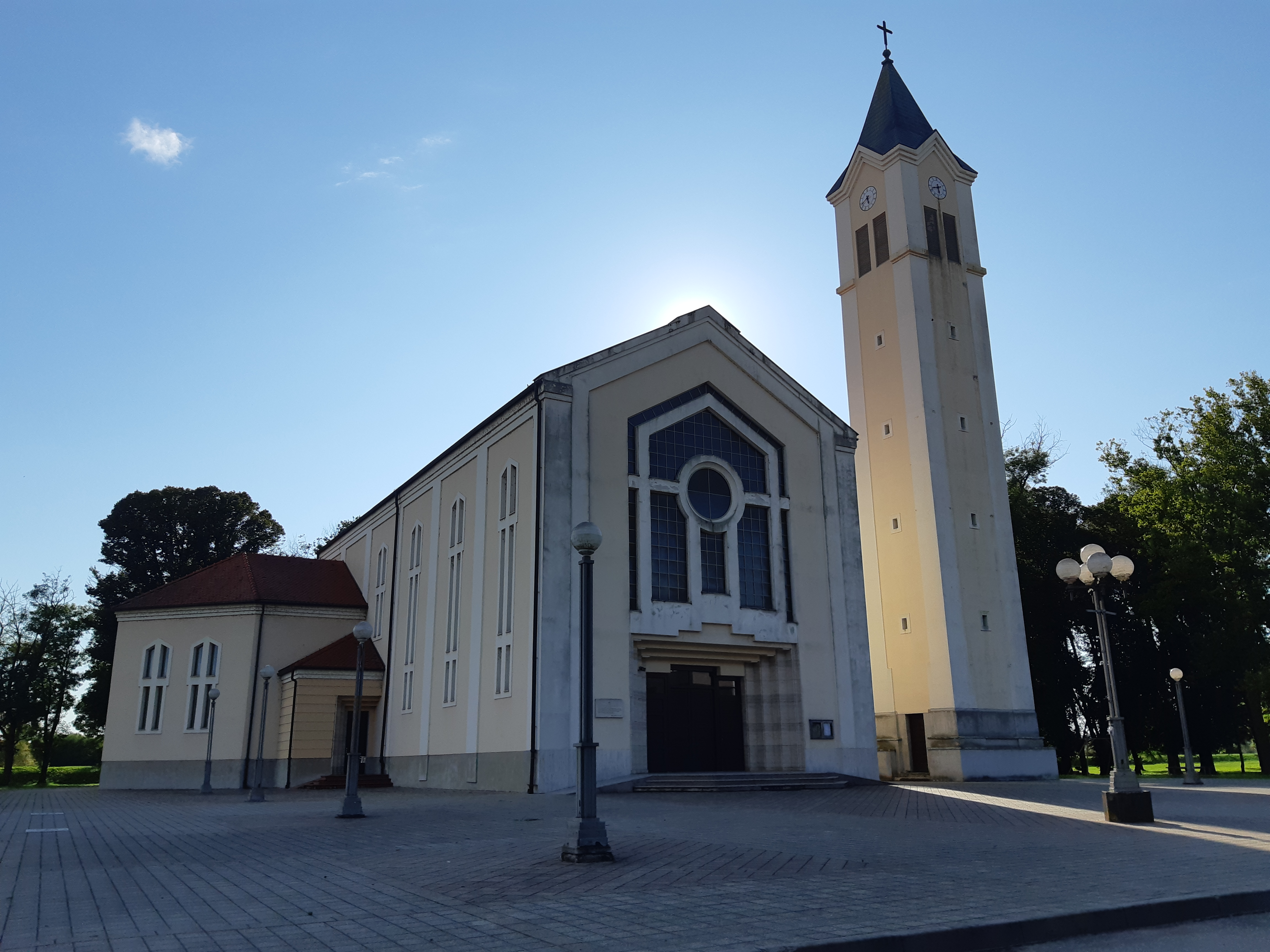
Croatian Catholic St. Ivan Nepomuk church in Glina

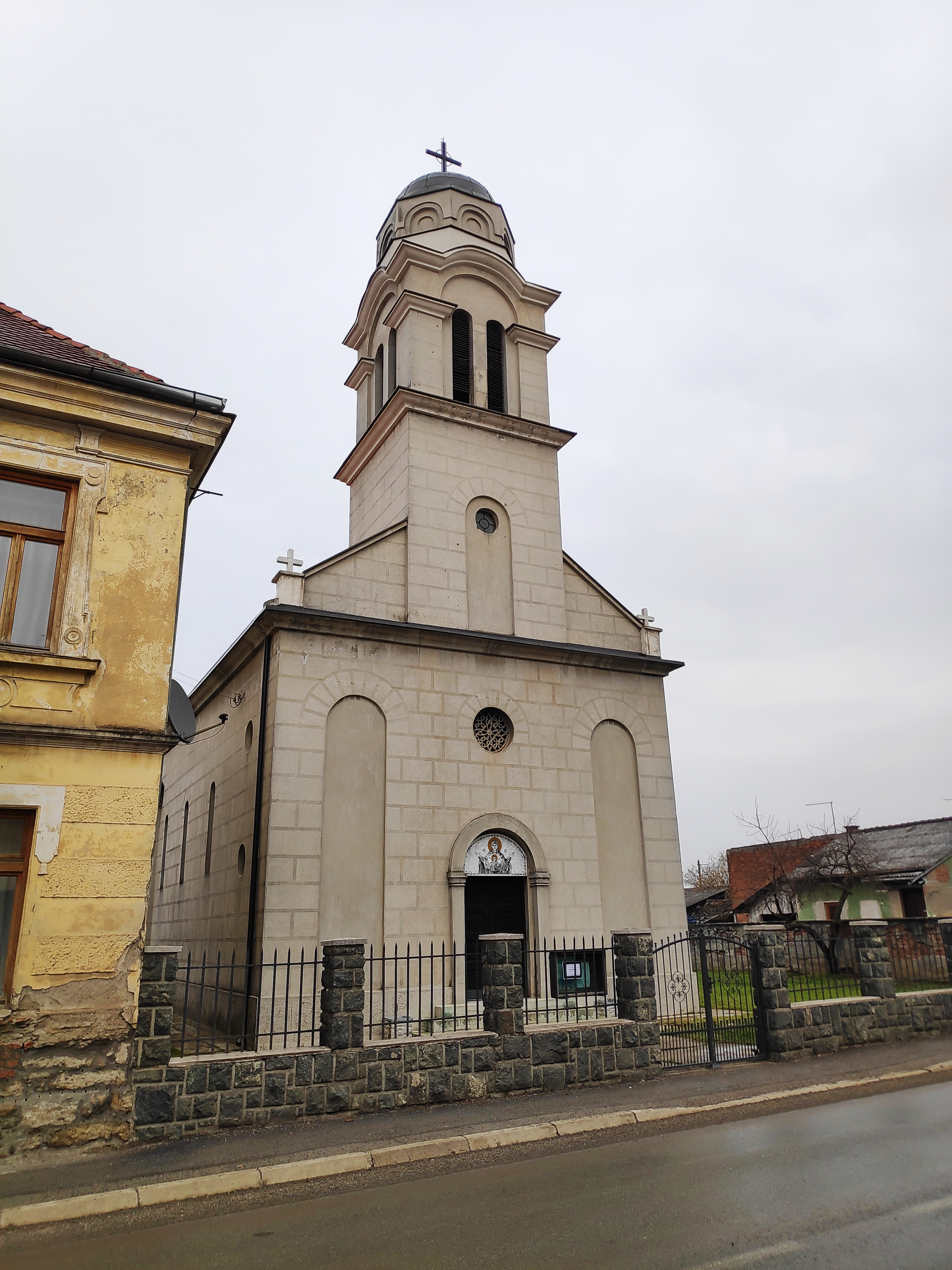
Serbian Orthodox church in Glina

Glina is a town in central Croatia, located southwest of Petrinja and Sisak in the Sisak-Moslavina County. It lies on the eponymous river Glina.

== History ==
=== Early history ===
Glina was first mentioned as a city on 1 June 1284. Later in September 1737, during the threat of the Turks, the Croatian Sabor met in Glina. It was also a post of Ban Jelačić when he became the commander the Military Frontier during the Turkish threat.

During the mid-18th century, Count Ivan Drašković created Freemason lodges in several Croatian cities and towns, including Glina, where officers and other members shared ideas of the Jacobins from the French Revolution, until Emperor Francis II banned them in 1798. During the 1790 Siege of Cetingrad, Glina was quickly fortified in preparation for an Ottoman assault if Cetingrad were to fall which it did not. In the late 19th and early 20th century, Glina was a district capital in the Zagreb County of the Kingdom of Croatia-Slavonia.

=== World War II ===
During World War II, Glina was part of the Independent State of Croatia established by the Axis powers as a result of the Invasion of Yugoslavia. There were two major Ustashe massacres of Serbs in Glina in 1941. On the night of 11 May, Ustaše arrested male Serbs over the age of sixteen, regardless of occupation or class. The men were first imprisoned in a small holding area of a former gendarmerie building, then on the night of 12 May, they were tied up in pairs, loaded into trucks and taken to a large pit where they were killed, primarily with guns. Historian Slavko Goldstein writes that "less than four hundred, but certainly higher than three hundred" were killed in total.

Another massacre occurred on 30 July-2 August when 700 Serbs were gathered under the threat of forced conversion and executed in the local Serbian Orthodox Church. The dates as well as the number of victims in this massacre are disputed in sources. According to Italian reports, in total, more than 18,000 Serbs were killed in the district of Glina during the war. The Yugoslav Partisans attacked Glina and Hrastovica in late November 1943. The position was held by the Nazi Germany army with support from the Danish 11th SS Volunteer Panzergrenadier Division Nordland. The Partisans liberated and entered the town on January 11, 1944.

=== Socialist Yugoslavia ===
After the end of war in 1964, the Committee for the Construction of Memorials to the July Victims of Fascist Terror in Banija and Kordun sent a request to the Veterans Associations of the People’s Liberation War of Yugoslavia (SUBNOR) to finally build a memorial as the failure to do so was particularly affecting the brotherhood and unity of the people in this region. A memorial house was thereafter built on the site of the destroyed Orthodox church and in 1985, its executive committee requested assistance in creating a permanent display for the museum which read: "the Ustasha slaughtered around 1,200 Serbs from the surroundings of Glina on August 2, 1941", noting that it marked the beginning of the Genocide of Serbs in the Independent State of Croatia.

=== Yugoslav wars ===
In the early summer of 1991, the first major armed clashes between Croatian forces and rebelled Serbs took place in the Glina area. On June 26, a day after the declaration of independence of Croatia, a group of armed Serbs attacked the local police station. The second armed attack followed a month later, on July 26. Serb militias were reported to have used ethnic Croats as human shields in the conflict. Civilians from both sides died as a result of the fighting in Glina. Croatian Police and National Guard units had to withdraw while Croats from Glina (including Jukinac) took refuge in Donji and Gornji Viduševac, villages north of Glina that were free at the time. Subsequently, Glina was completely controlled by the Yugoslav People's Army and the Serb rebels. The remaining non-Serb population from Glina and the surrounding area were mostly expelled while many were taken to internment camps. During the war, Serbs occupied the territory up to the Kupa river, which was followed by many crimes against the civilians in Novo Selo Glinsko, Stankovci and Bučič area. In 1995, future President of Serbia Aleksandar Vučić held a meeting in Glina during which he stated, among others that Glina would never be part of Croatia and advocated for it to be a part of Greater Serbia. A total of 396 Croatian civilians and soldiers were killed in Glina during the war. On 6 August 1995, Glina was returned to Croatia by the Croatian Army during Operation Storm. At the same time, most ethnic Serbs fled. In December 2015, the bodies of 56 Serb civilians and soldiers killed during the action were exhumed from a mass grave in the Gornje Selište municipality.

=== Recent ===
The area of Glina suffered extensive damage during the 2020 Petrinja earthquake.

== Demographics ==
Town of Glina: Population trends 1857–2021
v

population	29254	31012	29896	35470	37771	39261	36751	39746	31732	32137	30729	28336	25079	23040	9868	9283	7116
	1857	1869	1880	1890	1900	1910	1921	1931	1948	1953	1961	1971	1981	1991	2001	2011	2021

Sources: Croatian Bureau of Statistics publications

National structure of the municipality of Glina
Year of census	total	Croats	Serbs	Yugoslavs	Other
2011	9,283	6,468 (69.68%)	2,549 (27.46%)	0 (0%)	266 (2.86%)
2001	9,868	6,712 (68%)	2,829 (29%)	0 (0%)	327 (3.31%)
1991	23,040	8,041 (34,90%)	13,975 (60.65%)	473 (2.05%)	551 (2.39%)
1981	25,079	8,961 (35.73%)	14,223 (56.71%)	1,580 (6.30%)	315 (1.26%)
1971	28,336	10,785 (38.06%)	16,936 (59.77%)	381 (1.34%)	234 (0.83%)
1961	27,747	9,152 (33.31%)	18,388 (66.93%)	60 (0.22%)	147 (0,53%)

The results are for the whole municipality of Glina which was larger during previous censuses. In some censuses, people listed themselves as Yugoslavs (not Serbs or Croats).

National structure of the town of Glina
Year of census	total	Croats	Serbs	Yugoslavs	Other
2001	3,116	2,315 (74.29%)	643 (20.64%)	0 (0%)	158 (5.07%)
1991	6,933	1,448 (20.88%)	4,831 (69.68%)	362 (5.22%)	352 (5.08%)
1981	5,790	1,262 (21.79%)	3,531 (60.98%)	870 (15.02%)	127 (2,19%)
1971	4,558	1,394 (30.58%)	2,873 (63.03%)	193 (4.23%)	98 (2.15%)
1961	2,412	884 (36.65%)	1,425 (59.08%)	33 (1.37%)	70 (2.90%)
1948	2,098	1,126 (53.67%)	930 (44.33%)	0 (0%)	42 (2%)

=== Settlements ===
The settlements part of the administrative area of Glina, total population 9,283 (census 2011), include:

- Balinac, population 69
- Baturi, population 0
- Bijele Vode, population 67
- Bišćanovo, population 0
- Bojna, population 28
- Borovita, population 17
- Brestik, population 76
- Brezovo Polje, population 24
- Brnjeuška, population 13
- Brubno, population 4
- Buzeta, population 67
- Dabrina, population 86
- Desni Degoj, population 86
- Dolnjaki, population 102
- Donja Bučica, population 54
- Donja Trstenica, population 0
- Donje Jame, population 22
- Donje Selište, population 109
- Donje Taborište, population 40
- Donji Klasnić, population 90
- Donji Selkovac, population 1
- Donji Viduševac, population 179
- Dragotina, population 149
- Drenovac Banski, population 74
- Dvorišće, population 99
- Glina, population 4,680
- Gornja Bučica, population 128
- Gornje Jame, population 0
- Gornje Selište, population 55
- Gornje Taborište, population 56
- Gornji Klasnić, population 41
- Gornji Selkovac, population 0
- Gornji Viduševac, population 468
- Gračanica Šišinečka, population 24
- Hađer, population 50
- Hajtić, population 32
- Ilovačak, population 93
- Joševica, population 37
- Kihalac, population 50
- Kozaperovica, population 46
- Maja, population 168
- Majske Poljane, population 196
- Majski Trtnik, population 36
- Mala Solina, population 15
- Mali Gradac, population 143
- Mali Obljaj, population 34
- Marinbrod, population 93
- Martinovići, population 71
- Momčilovića Kosa, population 36
- Novo Selo Glinsko, population 118
- Prekopa, population 143
- Prijeka, population 57
- Ravno Rašće, population 129
- Roviška, population 46
- Skela, population 41
- Slatina Pokupska, population 88
- Stankovac, population 24
- Svračica, population 44
- Šaševa, population 26
- Šatornja, population 176
- Šibine, population 28
- Trnovac Glinski, population 31
- Trtnik Glinski, population 14
- Turčenica, population 0
- Velika Solina, population 69
- Veliki Gradac, population 126
- Veliki Obljaj, population 22
- Vlahović, population 73
- Zaloj, population 20

== Politics ==
=== Minority councils and representatives ===
Directly elected minority councils and representatives are tasked with consulting tasks for the local or regional authorities in which they are advocating for minority rights and interests, integration into public life and participation in the management of local affairs. At the 2023 Croatian national minorities councils and representatives elections Serbs of Croatia fulfilled legal requirements to elect 15 members minority council of the Town of Glina.

== Sports ==
in 1937, the local chapter of the HPS, HPD "Petrova Gora", had recently been founded. With Stjepan Prpić as its president, it had 24 members. Membership rose to 29 in 1938.

== Notable people from Glina ==
- Natko Devčić, Croatian composer
- Slavko Hirsch, Croatian physician
- Zlatko Šulentić, Croatian painter
- Branka Bakšić Mitić, humanitarian and vice-mayor of Glina
- Stefan Hajdin, Serbian professional footballer
