= Banovina (region) =

Coordinates: 45°20′36″N 16°13′07″E

Banovina Banija
- Geographic region^{a}
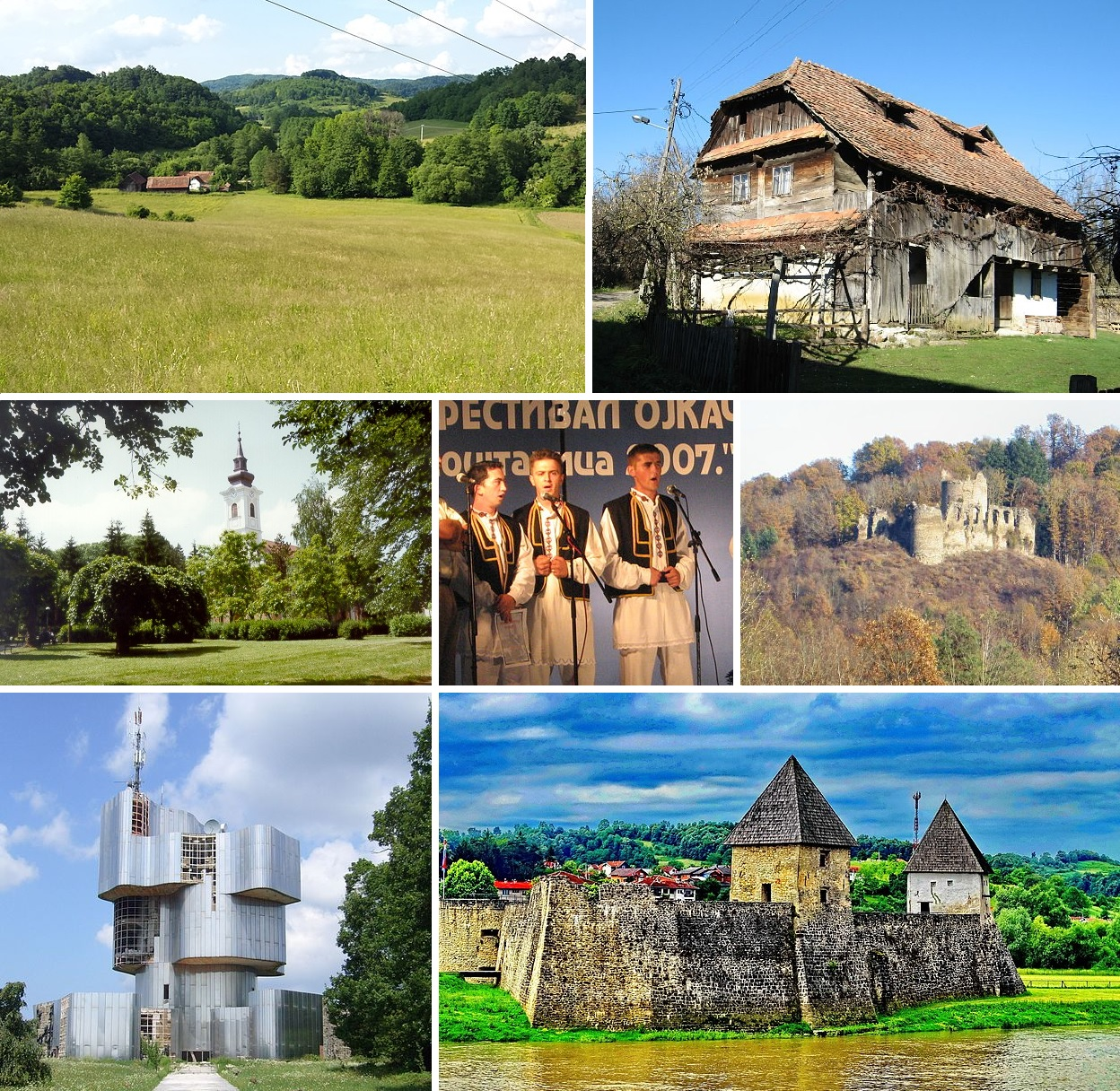
- Collage of Banovina Photos
- Etymology: Croatian: banovina, lit. 'banate'
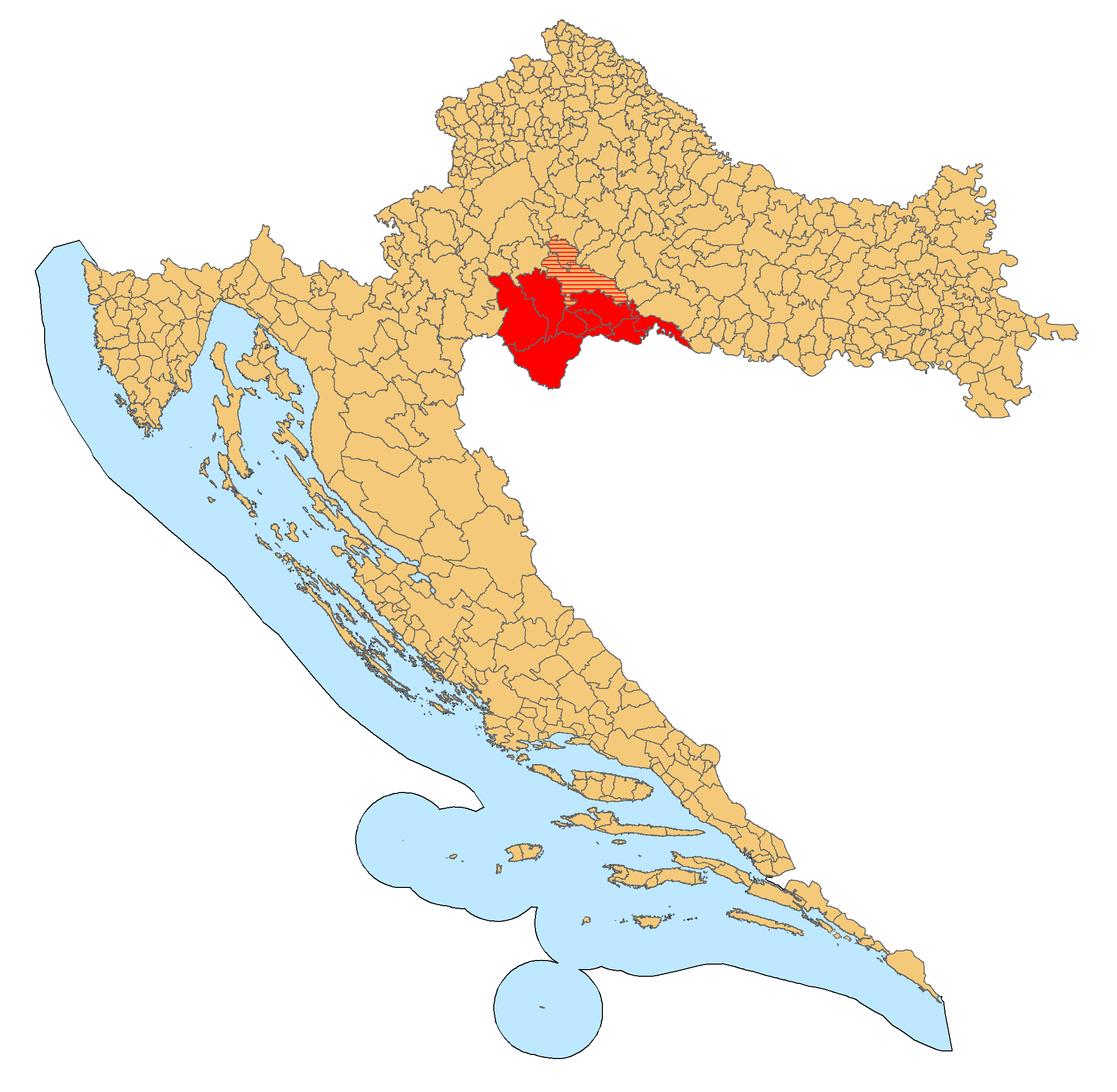
- Banovina on a map of Croatia colored in red. Banovina is located in the southern part of Sisak-Moslavina County (City of Sisak and Municipality of Martinska Ves shown in dashed because they are sometimes referred to as parts of Banovina.)
- Country: Croatia

Area^{b}
  - Total: 4,463 km^{2} (1,723 sq mi)

Population (2001)^{c}
  - Total: 183,730
  - Density: 41.17/km^{2} (106.6/sq mi)
- ^{a} Banovina is not designated as an official region, it is a geographic region only.^{b} The figure is an approximation based on the territorial span of Sisak-Moslavina County.^{c} The figure is an approximation based on the population of Sisak-Moslavina County.

Banovina or Banija is a geographical region in central Croatia, between the Sava, Una, Kupa and Glina rivers. The main towns in the region include Petrinja, Glina, Kostajnica, and Dvor. There is no clear geographical border of the region towards the west and the neighboring region of Kordun. The area of Banovina is today administratively almost entirely located within the Sisak-Moslavina County.

== Name ==
The region's principal names come from the word "ban", with other names in use having included Banska Zemlja ("Ban's Land") and Banska Krajina ("Ban's Frontier"), which is a reference to the medieval Ban of Croatia and the Military Frontier, specifically Croatian Military Frontier.

In Serbian Cyrillic, the name is spelled Банија or Бановина. The word banovina is Croatian for banate.

The term Banovina was more frequent as the name of the region in the 19th and early 20th centuries. The term Banija became more common in the first half of the 20th century, until the 1990s. Since then, both terms are equally in use.

== History ==
=== Prehistory ===
During the era of Chalcolithic Vučedol culture centered in Syrmia and eastern Slavonia spread to the area of modern-day Banovina with known archaeological sites being those in Osječenica near the village of Gorička, Budim near the village of Mali Gradac and the Iron Age site next to the Una river in the village of Unčani. During the Iron Age region was inhabited by a Celtic-Illyrians tribe of Segestani.

=== Classical antiquity ===
During the Roman time the region was important transitional area between the provinces of Pannonia and Illyricum with nearby Siscia already serving as a regional center. Until today archaeological excavation of Roman sites in the region remain limited.

=== Middle Ages and Ottoman Conquest ===
The area surrounding Petrinja and Hrastovica belonged to the Kaptol while the area west of the Glina River belonged to the Topusko Abbey. The Order of Cistercians received the abbey's possessions in 1205 from the Andrew II of Hungary.

=== Habsburg Monarchy and Austro-Hungarian Empire ===
After the reconquest of Banija the region became a part of Glina Regiment of Zagreb General Command within the Croatian Military Frontier between 1553 and 1881. In November 1630, Holy Roman Emperor Ferdinand II proclaimed the so-called Statuta Valachorum ("Vlach Statute"), which regulated the status of settlers with regard to their military obligations and rights to internal self-administration. During this time the term "Vlach" designated a social class and was applied to military settlers regardless of their origins; most were ethnolinguistically Slavic. In Banovina they were mostly ancestors of modern-day Serbs of Croatia. The Croatian Military Frontier existed until 15 July 1881, when it was abolished and incorporated into the Kingdom of Croatia-Slavonia.

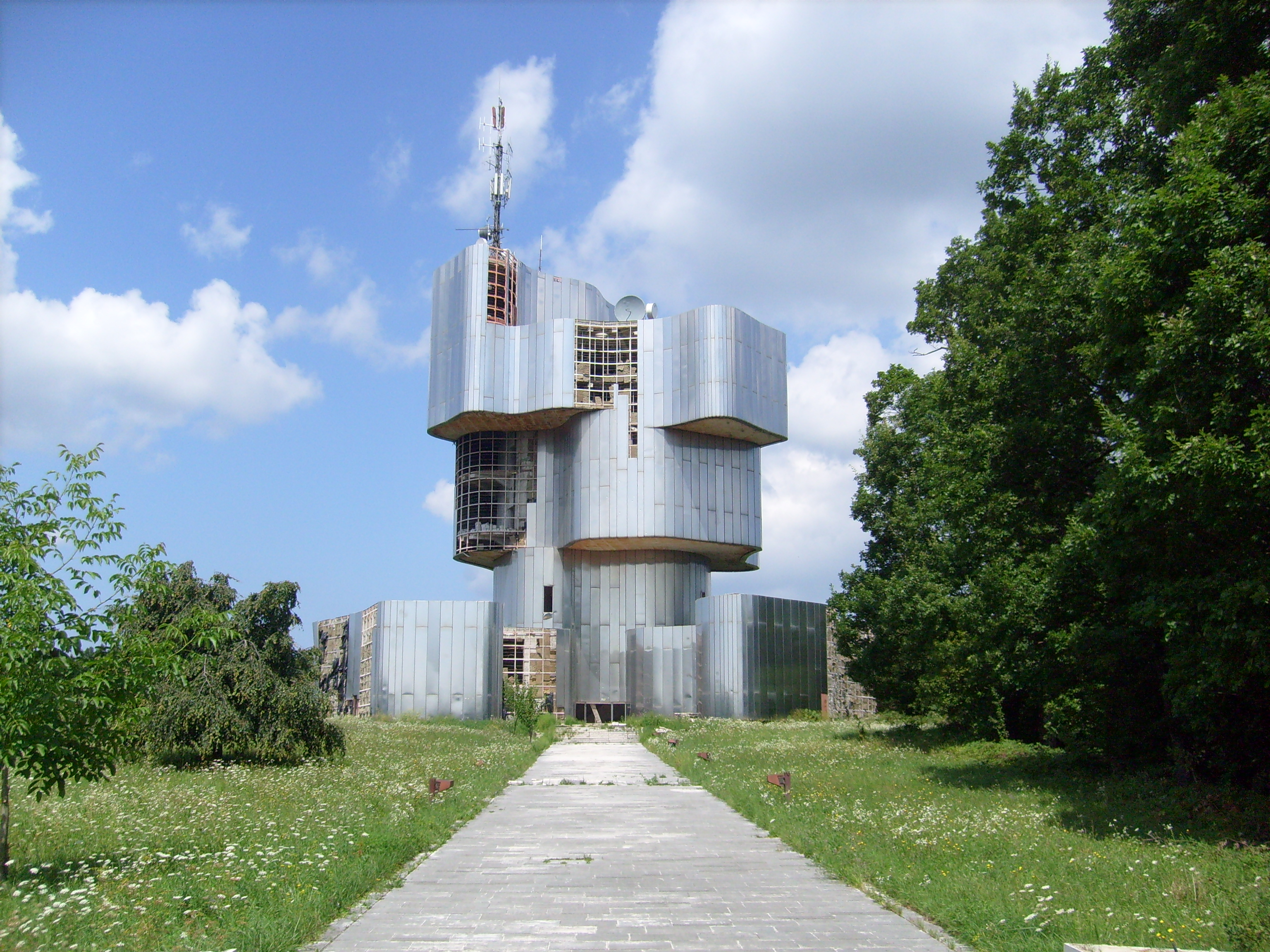
Monument to the uprising of the people of Kordun and Banija

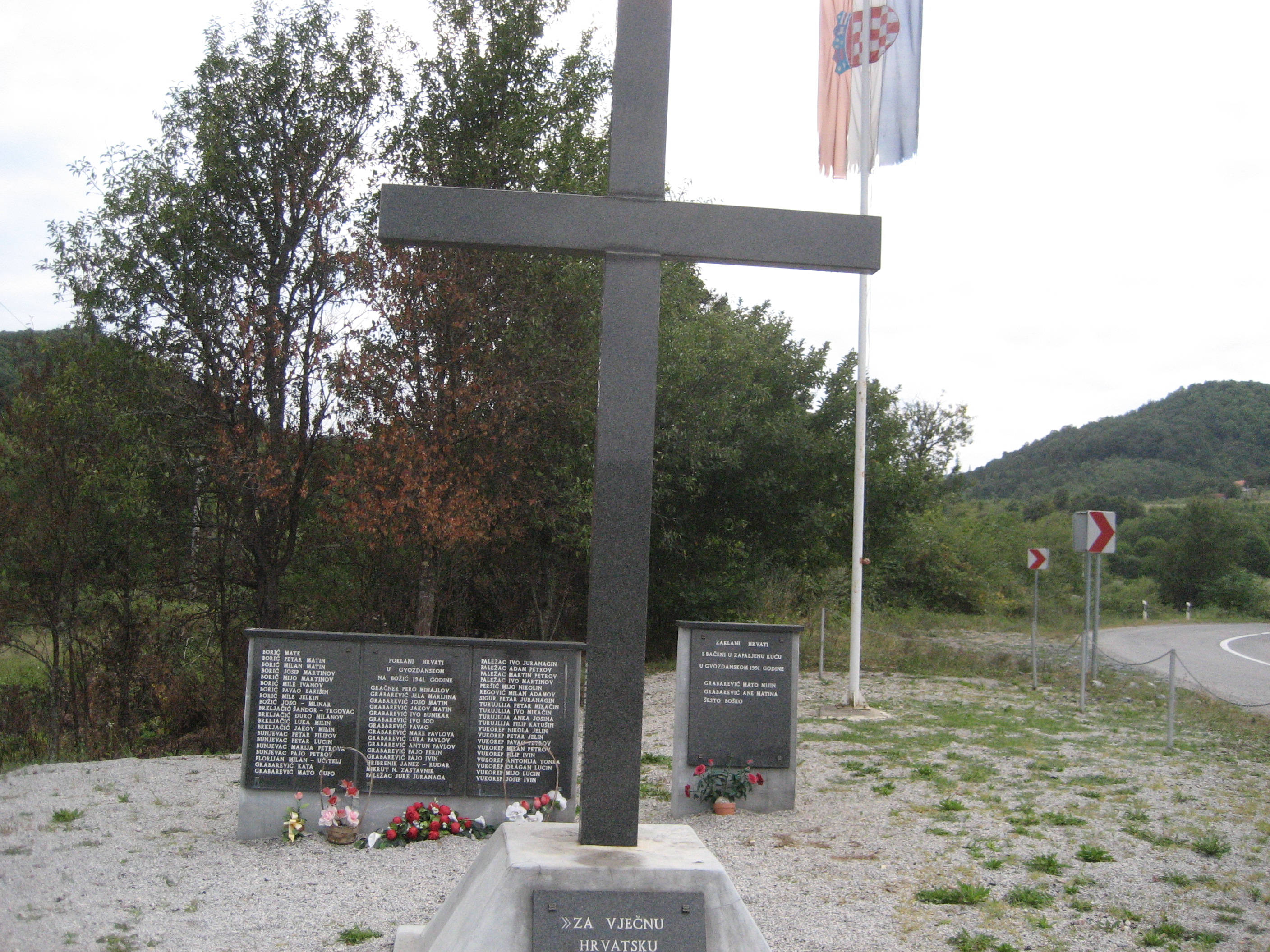
Monument to the Croatian Victims of the 1941 Chetnik Massacre in Gvozdansko

=== Kingdom of Yugoslavia ===
During the interwar period Banovina was divided between Vrbas Banovina whose seat was in Banja Luka and Sava Banovina whose seat was in Zagreb. In 1939 Sava Banovina became a part of the autonomous Banovina of Croatia.

=== World War II ===
During the World War II in Yugoslavia, the region was one of the main targets of the Chetnik war crimes in World War II and the genocide of Serbs in the Independent State of Croatia. One of the most infamous mass killings was the Glina massacres of 2,000–2,400 people. Consequentially, the region also became one of the strongholds of the Yugoslav Partisans, Europe's most effective anti-Axis resistance movement.

=== Croatian War of Independence ===
During the Croatian War of Independence in the 1990s the entire region of Banovina became a part of internationally unrecognized self-proclaimed Republic of Serbian Krajina and known for infamous mass killings of Croats. Croatian government retook control over the region in 1995 via Croatian forces Operation Storm leading to mass fleeing of nearly the entire Serb population of Banovina and resulting serious depopulation of the region. Subsequent return was only partial and slow.

After the war, a number of towns and municipalities in the region were designated Areas of Special State Concern.

=== 21st century ===
The 2020 Petrinja earthquake was a catastrophe that significantly affected this region. On 29 December 2020, the region was struck by a magnitude 6.4M_{w} earthquake, which killed seven people, including a seven-year-old girl. Most of the buildings in both towns and villages were significantly damaged or completely destroyed. The destruction combined with the ongoing COVID-19 pandemic presented challenges for emergency workers to distribute aid and healthcare to the affected population. Aftershocks continued to jolt the area in the subsequent days and weeks, including a magnitude 4.1 over two weeks later.

== See also ==
- Geography of Croatia
- Glina, Croatia
- Petrinja
- Hrvatska Kostajnica
- Dvor, Croatia
- Sunja, Sisak-Moslavina County
- Donji Kukuruzari

== Sources ==
- Škiljan, Filip (2008). Kulturno – historijski spomenici Banije s pregledom povijesti Banije od prapovijesti do 1881 [Cultural and historical monuments of Banija with an overview of history Banija from prehistory to 1881.] (in Serbian). Zagreb, Croatia: Serb National Council. ISBN 978-953-7442-04-0.
