= Agram Trial =

1909 show trial in Austria-Hungary

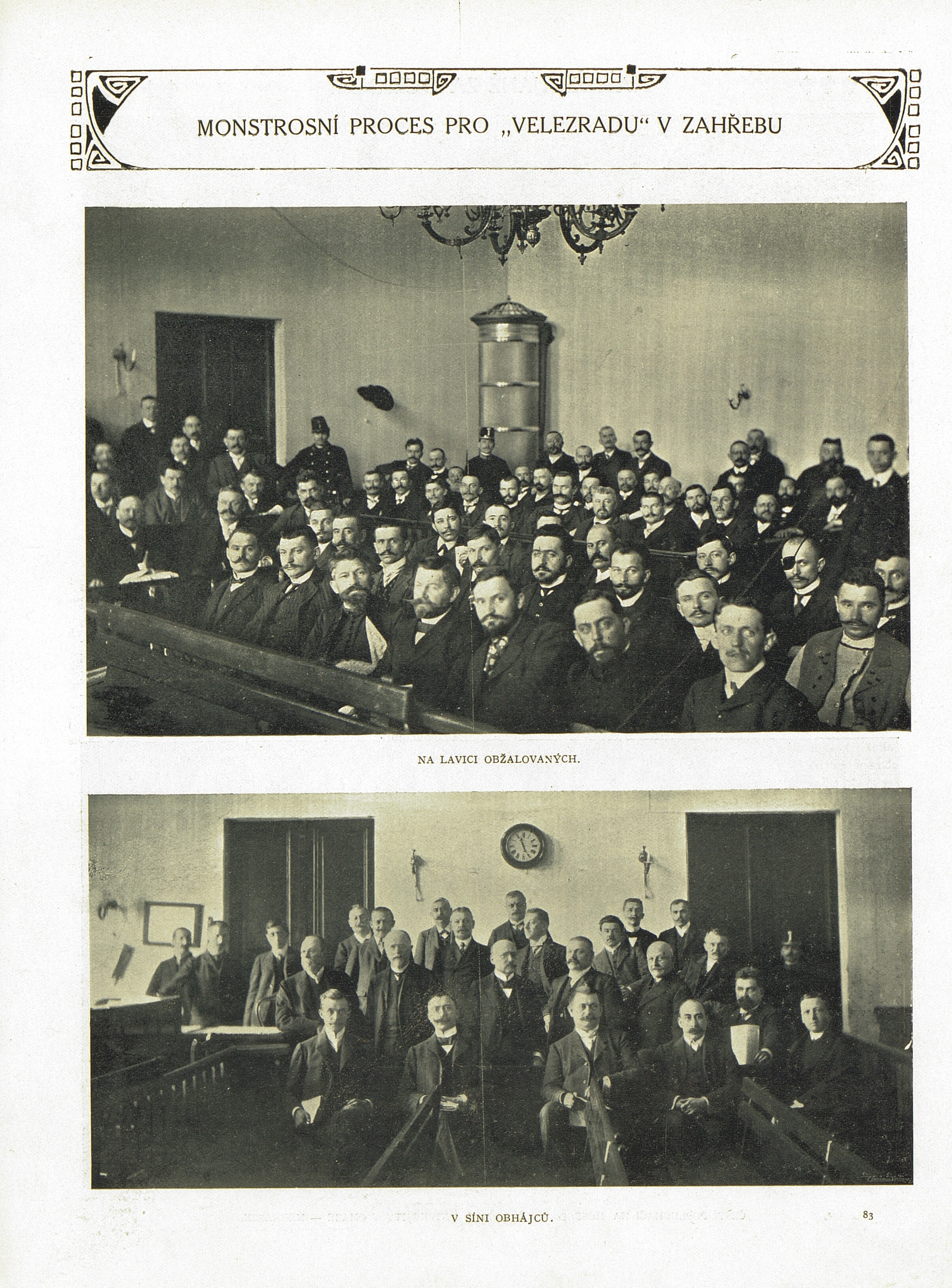
Photos from the trial (Czech magazine Světozor, 30. 4. 1909)

The Agram Trial or Zagreb Trial (known as the "High treason trial" in Serbo-Croatian, veleizdajnički proces) was the 1909 show trial of 53 ethnic Serbs in Zagreb, Croatia (then part of Austria-Hungary) for high treason. The accused were members of the Serb Independent Party (SSS), who were accused of conspiracy to overthrow the state and place Croatia-Slavonia under Serbian rule. The trial attracted huge attention and criticism from all over Europe. It was highly politicized and the government hoped to use the trial to discredit the Croat-Serb Coalition that won majority in the 1908 Croatian parliamentary election, and to justify the annexation of Bosnia and Herzegovina. During the trial and after it, it became clear that the accusations were false and that the evidence against the accused was falsified. Nevertheless, 31 of the accused Serbs were convinced and sentenced to prison terms. The scandal became a public disaster for the government of Austria-Hungary. All of the accused appealed their convictions, and the appellate court ordered a re-trial. After that, in 1910, emperor Franz Joseph I pardoned all of the accused.

== Background ==
In January 1908, Pavao Rauch was named Ban of Croatia-Slavonia by the Austrian emperor and Hungarian king Franz Joseph I. Croatia-Slavonia was part of the Kingdom of Hungary which was itself part of Austria-Hungary. Previous ban, Aleksandar Rakodczay dissolved the previous convocation of the Croatian Sabor (Parliament) and scheduled fresh elections for February 1908. Rauch supported government-backed candidates, but the 1908 Croatian parliamentary election returned surprising results. Not a single government-backed candidate was elected, and the majority of seats was won by the Croat-Serb Coalition. The new convocation was to held its first session in March 1908, but Rauch postponed it indefinitely. In an interview, Rauch said the Croat-Serb Coalition wants to destroy Austria-Hungary and that the main proponents of this policy is the Serb Independent Party (SSS), part of the Coalition. Rauch and his government started a smear campaign against the SSS and its leaders. This campaign was supported by the anti-Serb Pure Party of Rights.

On 10 April 1908, a group of 18 members of the parliament from the SSS wrote an open letter to Rauch. In the latter, they called on Rauch to sue them in court and to prove his accusations against the SSS. Rauch stepped back and said that he will not sue the SSS, trying to defuse the situation. In another letter, dated 15 April, SSS MPs wrote that Rauch's refusal to sue them in court is a proof that his previous accusations against them were "lies, slanders and denunciations". After counseling with Hungarian Prime Minister Sándor Wekerle, Rauch intensified his campaign against SSS members and started to collect evidence against them.

== Arrests and indicment ==
On 7 August 1908, Adam Pribićević, county clerk from Pregrada, was arrested. A day later, his brother Valerijan Pribićević, professor at the Orthodox Clerical High School in Karlovci, was arrested too. They were taken into custody of the county court in Zagreb. After that, investigative judge Mirko Košutić and public prosecutor Milan Accurti started their "traitor hunt" across Croatia-Slavonia. They collected evidence against members of the SSS and at the same time collected witnesses of the prosecution, mainly supporters of the Pure Party of Rights. Those investigations, that lasted until the end of the year, resulted in dozens of Serbs being arrested and taken to detention of the Zagreb court. Although the Law mandated that every arrested person should be subject to hearing during investigation, none of them were interrogated. In November, some of the arrested Serbs started hunger strike demanding to be interrogated and formally indicted. This strike was suspended after eleven days, but in December, all of the arrested started hunger strike. This strike was suspended only after they were given assurances that the indictment will be filed before 15 January 1909.

On 12 January 1909, the prosecutor filed indictment against 53 persons. All of them were accused of being members of an organized conspiracy that sought to secede Croatia-Slavonia, Dalmatia and Bosnia from Austria-Hungary and annex them to Serbia, in coordination with the organization Slovenski jug (Slavic south) from Belgrade. Thus, they were all accused of high treason, which was punishable by capital punishment. Pribićević brothers, Joco Oreščanin, Pero Bekić, Simo A. Živković were accused as the main leaders of the organization. The court also asked the Sabor to waive parliamentary immunity for Svetozar Pribićević, Budo Budisavljević, Jovan Banjanin, Dr Bogdan Stojanović, Dr Milenko Marković and Dr Dušan Peleš, so that they can be arrested too. But, the Sabor never had a single session during Rauch's tenure, so their immunity could not be waived.

As the indictment was unprecise and full of inconsistencies, all of the accused filed appeals against the indictment to the Table of Seven. Those appeals were promptly dismissed. The prosecutor sought capital punishment for all of the accused. The start of the trial was scheduled for 3 March 1909. During the whole trial, the accused were held in the detention under harsh circumstances.

== Trial ==
The trial started on 3 March 1909 with the testimony of the accused. It attracted attention of media, some 20 foreign correspondents were present as well as numerous Austro-Hungarian journalists. Judicial panel was made up of five judges, presided by Josip Tarabokia. Prosecution was led by public prosecutor Accurti and his deputy Ivo Stožir. Defense was made up of 38 attorneys, led by Hinko Hinković. After reading the indictment, all accused stated that they did not understand the indictment because it did not contain precise crimes, nor precise evidence. Also, most of them did not even hear about the organization Slovenski jug they were accused of coordinating with.

The whole trial was marked by judge's biased attitude against the accused. This led to frequent aggressive conflicts between the judges and prosecution, on one side, and the accused and their attorneys on the other side. Also, conflicts between the accused and prosecution witnesses were frequent. The court often imposed disciplinary penalties against the accused. The largest such incident happened on 5 April when all the accused were excluded from the proceedings on 8 days, while Adam Pribićević and Bekić were sentenced to 24 hours of solitary confinement.

On 24 April, examination of prosecution witnesses commenced. Many of them retracted their statements given in the investigation and claimed that their statements were written not by them, but by Košutić. Their testimonies were conflicting and often unhelpful for the prosecution. The main prosecution witness was Đorđe Nastić. Nastić was previously member of Slovenski jug while living in Belgrade, and already testified in the Cetinje trial against the members of the Montenegro's People's Party, whom he accused of plotting with Serbia to overthrow Montenegrin monarchy. It was already known at the time that Nastić was paid by the Montenegrin government for this testimony. Before he testified at the Agram trial, Nastić consulted with Rauch. In April 1911, members of the SSS published documents that proved that Nastić was paid and instructed by the government for his testimony at the trial. Nastić himself sold those documents to the Serbian government in 1910 when he ran out of money.

In the closing arguments, the prosecutor stood by the accusation against all of the accused, but decided to seek capital punishment only against Adam and Valerijan Pribićević, Pero Bekić, Joco Oreščanin and Simo A. Živković as the main leaders of the conspiracy, and prison terms between 10 and 20 years for the others. The defense attorneys dismissed the charges and stated that all defendants were innocent.

=== Verdict and appeals ===
After 150 trial days, the verdict was delivered on 5 October 1909. 31 of the accused were sentenced to between five and twelve years, while 22 were quitted and immediately released. The 31 were found guilty of treason for inciting the idea that Croatia-Slavonia, Dalmatia, Bosnia, Bačka, Baranya, Istria and Slovenia should secede from the Austria-Hungary and be annexed to the Kingdom of Serbia. In the explanation of the judgment, the court stated that the main evidence of their guilt was that they were "using Serbian flag and Serbian coat of arms, and Cyrillic alphabet", "economically separating Serbs and Croats", and "popularizing the image of Serbian king Peter I and spreading positive image about Serbia and its freedoms".

The defense immediately appealed the verdict to the Table of Seven for re-examination. On 31 December 1909, those that were sentenced to less than ten years (29 of them, all except the Pribićević brothers) were temporarily released from detention by the Table of Seven while deciding on the appeal. In March 1910, the Table of Seven refused to release Pribićević brothers. On 4 April 1910, the Table quashed the verdict and ordered re-trial. Pribićević brothers were finally released from detention on 11 April 1910 after bail of 12000 krone was posted for both.

In November 1910, the Emperor pardoned all of the accused and the proceedings against them were terminated. The accused were not pleased with this development as they wanted re-trail so that they can prove their innocence.

== Reactions ==
Croatian and Serbian newspapers from Croatia-Slavonia, Kingdom of Dalmatia, Bosnia and Herzegovina, Vojvodina, as well as those from Serbia (Politika) covered the process extensively and criticized it sharply. After applauding arrests and criticizing arrested Serbs for their "anti-state" actions, Hungarian and Austrian newspapers turned their opinion against the process once it began. Budapesti Napló called the trial "a global scandal" and "a national tragedy", "hastily started only to please Aehrenthal". French, Russian, Polish, British, German, Italian and American press covered the trial in length, criticizing it. Many of them had their correspondents in Zagreb, covering the trial, including Hermann Bahr who wrote for Berliner Tageblatt. Politicians (Tomáš Masaryk, Václav Klofáč, Pavel Milyukov) and experts (Robert Seton-Watson, Wickham Steed, Cesare Lombroso) came to Zagreb to watch the trial.

The trial drew huge publicity, and the public opinion about it was overwhelmingly negative, which was a disaster for the public image of the Austro-Hungarian monarchy. In a brochure on the trial, printed in France, Belgian politician Emile Vandervelde wrote: "The Zagreb trial is the largest judicial scandal of our time." Bjørnstjerne Bjørnson wrote an article for The Times criticizing the process. Both French Human Rights League and its Belgian counterpart adopted resolutions against the Zagreb trial. After the verdict, large protests were organized in Dubrovnik and Kotor. In Montenegro, state authorities prevented public protests.

Croatian Sabor was not able to discuss the trial as it was adjourned during the entirety of Rauch's tenure. The Diet of Hungary addressed the issue on several occasions. Serbian and Croatian MPs criticized the trial and the Prime Minister, and Hungarian MP Soma Visontai joined those critics. In the Imperial Council's House of Deputies, Masaryk and 63 other MPs demanded an inquiry into the Zagreb trial. The proposal gained 167 votes against 133, but it was not accepted as it lacked the required supermajority.

== Motives ==
Austria-Hungary was given a mandate to occupy Bosnia and Herzegovina in 1878. In 1908, Austro-Hungarian government decided unilaterally to annex Bosnia and Herzegovina. They needed some kind of excuse for this act. So, the government started spreading fear of "Greater Serbian radicalism" and accusing majority Croat-Serb coalition of spreading this radicalism. The trial was intended to show that there was indeed Croato-Serbian conspiracy to destroy the monarchy. Another motive was to assert the power and discourage Serbia from interfering in the Bosnian Crisis.

The political goal of the trial was to break the Croat-Serb coalition. By accusing the SSS of Serb radicalism, the government hoped to turn the Croat part of the Coalition against the Serb part. This goal was not achieved. The Coalition remained the strongest political bloc in Croatia-Slavonia till the break-up of the Monarchy in 1918.

== The accused ==
One arrested person who was planned to be indicted (Milan Vujaklija) died before the trial, so there were 53 indictees after that. Of the 53 accused, 31 were found guilty by the Zagreb Court and sentenced on 5 October 1909. Other 22 were acquitted. Those who were sentenced were:

1. Adam Pribićević, county clerk intern from Pregrada, sentenced to 12 years
2. Valerijan Pribićević, professor at the Clerical High School in Sremski Karlovci, sentenced to 12 years
3. Pero Bekić, merchant from Dvor, sentenced to 8 years
4. Mojo Hrvaćanin, landowner from Dubica, sentenced to 7 years
5. Joco Oreščanin, teacher from Jamnica, sentenced to 7 years
6. Petar Petrović, teacher from Gornji Skrad, sentenced to 7 years
7. Miloš Borojević, teacher from Jasenovac, sentenced to 6 years
8. Simo A. Živković, graduate student in law from Dvor, sentenced to 6 years
9. Tanasije Oblaković, teacher from Strmen, sentenced to 6 years
10. Đuro Erak, landowner from Dubica, sentenced to 6 years
11. Stevan (Stevo) Kalember, merchant from Korenica, sentenced to 6 years
12. Dr Aleksandar Đurić (or Grujić), physician from Grubišno Polje, sentenced to 6 years
13. Vaso Lukač, merchant from Vrginmost, sentenced to 5 years
14. Gajo Živković, merchant from Topusko, sentenced to 5 years
15. Rade Malobabić, merchant form Velika Vranovina, sentenced to 5 years
16. Đuro Jovanović, farmer from Bović, sentenced to 5 years
17. Nikola Rebrača, merchant from Glina, sentenced to 5 years
18. Stanko Rebrača, bank teller from Glina, sentenced to 5 years
19. Đuro Končar, merchant and innkeeper from Glina, sentenced to 5 years
20. Stevo Končar, barber from Glina, sentenced to 5 years
21. Stevan (Stevo) Kačar, municipal notary and treasurer from Strmen, sentenced to 5 years
22. Pavao (Pavle) Matijašević, teacher from Crkveni Bok, sentenced to 5 years
23. Stevo Radovanović, merchant from Crkveni Bok, sentenced to 5 years
24. Dimitrije (Mitar) Hrvaćanin, municipal chief from Dubica, sentenced to 5 years
25. Lazar (Lazo) Bačić, merchant from Jasenovac, sentenced to 5 years
26. Vaso Vukdragović, school principal from Okučani, sentenced to 5 years
27. Mile Mitrić, farmer from Davor, sentenced to 5 years
28. Danilo Podunavac, chaplain from Pakrac, sentenced to 5 years
29. Đorđe Jagnjić, merchant from Pakrac, sentenced to 5 years
30. Mile Ćorić, municipal chief from Ivanjski Bok, sentenced to 5 years
31. Milan Vukelić, teacher from Stara Gradiška, sentenced to 5 years

Those that were acquitted were:

1. Nikola Milić, priest from Stipan
2. Antonije Srnić, teacher from Kirin
3. Milovan Momčilović, teacher from Stipan
4. Mitar Miljević, merchant and baker from Topusko
5. Dušan Trbojević, teacher from Perna
6. Gedeon Ogrizović, forester from Glina
7. Nikola Ercegovac, priest from Glina
8. Ljubomir Vilić, tailor from Glina
9. Dimitrije Gajić, merchant from Glina
10. Bogdan Ristović, cadastre clerk intern from Glina
11. Simo Živković sr., innkeeper and landlord from Dvor
12. Đorđe Grujić, retired forester from Majur
13. Dušan Ervaćanin, merchant from Dubica
14. Glišo Vasić, landowner from Dubica
15. Platon Solarić, priest from Katinac
16. Dr Dušan Mihajlo Mioković, physician from Đulovac
17. Nikola Čudić, retired municipal notary from Uljanik
18. Stevo Zukanović, innkeeper from Pakrac
19. Simo Vuksan, teacher from Pakrac
20. Kosta Dragosavac, teacher from Kusonje
21. Dositije Kutuzov, parish administrator from Stara Gradiška
22. Jovan Kalafatić, merchant and innkeeper from Uskoci

== Related events ==
=== Žarko Miladinović case ===
In parallel with the main Agram trial, the public prosecutor prepared another trial for high treason against Žarko Miladinović, a lawyer from Ruma, and 17 others. At the beginning of the Agram trial, Miladinović was intended to be the defense attorney of some of the accused, but his registration was denied due to the fact that he was also under investigation for high treason. Miladinović was arrested on 11 March 1909 and held in the detention of the Zagreb county court, while the other 17 were not arrested. They were accused of smuggling arms from Serbia to Bosnia in connection with the Bosnian Crisis and also for recruiting volunteers among Croatian Serbs for fighting on the Serbian side, thus committing high treason.

In April, Miladinović's lawyer requested that his case be transferred to the military court. Under the Croatian law at the time, recruiting volunteers for a foreign army was considered a military crime that could only be tried by the military court. In May, the military court agreed and formally ordered the transfer of Miladinović to a military detention. Košutić delayed the transfer for a month. During his detention in the Zagreb county court, Miladinović was held under harsh conditions, in a solitary confinement for more than a month. Finally, in June, the county court declared it has no jurisdiction over the case and transferred Miladinović and his case to the military court in Zagreb. On 19 August, the military court terminated proceedings against Miladinović and others due to lack of evidence. Miladinović was immediately released from detention.

=== Friedjung affair ===
In March 1909, Austrian historian Heinrich Friedjung wrote an article for Neue Freie Presse in which he claimed he was in possession of some documents that can prove that four MPs from the Croat-Serb coalition committed high treason. Among the alleged documents was a secret report written by Miroslav Spalajković from the Serbian Ministry of Foreign Affairs that could prove that Serbian government was financing the Coalition and that Frano Supilo, one of the Coalition leaders, was colluding with Serbian prime minister Nikola Pašić. Friedjung claimed he possessed original documents, but declined to disclose names of four MPs. He claimed he will only reveal the names in court. In an interview for Pester Lloyd, Spalajković replied that he never wrote such a report and that Friedjung must be in possession of a forgery. He called on Friedjung to submit the document to forensic analysis, but Friedjung declined.

Members of the Coalition (Supilo, Bogdan Medaković and Grga Tuškan) called on Friedjung to disclose names of alleged traitors, so that they can sue him in court. Although Friedjung declined to disclose names, members of the Coalition together with Teodor Pejačević sued him and Reichspost newspaper to the Viennese court (Reichspost also published some defaming articles about them). The litigation started on 9 December 1909. This trial attracted attention from all important European newspapers who sent their reporters to cover it.

Although he previously claimed to be in possession of the original documents, during the trial, Friedjung only presented copies of the documents and few photos. It soon came out that the "documents" were two sets of forgeries created by Rauch and Austro-Hungarian ambassador to Serbia János Forgách, who sent them to foreign minister Alois Lexa von Aehrenthal as originals. Aehrenthal showed copies of those documents to Friedjung and Reichspost editors. In court, Friedjung had to admit that he never saw the documents themselves and was only shown their copies in the Foreign ministry. After Friedjung admitted his documents were forged, the plaintiffs agreed to withdraw the lawsuit in return.

Friedjung affair was a public humiliation for the Austro-Hungarian government as it revealed its aggressive and immoral actions against its own citizens.

== Sources ==
- Beaver, Jan G. (2009). Collision Course. Lulu. pp. 154–. ISBN 978-0-557-09600-8.
- Ćirković, Sima (2004). The Serbs. Malden: Blackwell Publishing. ISBN 9781405142915.
- Miller, Nicholas J. (1997). Between Nation and State: Serbian Politics in Croatia Before the First World War. Pittsburgh: University of Pittsburgh Press. ISBN 978-0-8229-3989-4.
- Singleton, Fred (1985). A Short History of the Yugoslav Peoples. Cambridge University Press. pp. 109–. ISBN 978-0-521-27485-2.
