= Pribićević =

Pribićević is a Slavic surname. People with the surname include:

- Adam Pribićević, a Yugoslav politician
- Svetozar Pribićević, a Croatian Serb politician
- Valerijan Pribićević, a vicar bishop of the Serbian Orthodox Church
- Milan Pribićević, a Yugoslav political activist
- Christina Pribićević-Zorić, an American translator
