= Stoyan Pribichevich =

Serbian-American journalist and foreign correspondent (1905-1976)

Stoyan Pribichevich also spelled Stojan Pribićević (Serbian Cyrillic: Стојан Прибићевић; 1905–1976) was a Serbian American journalist and foreign correspondent of Fortune, Time, Life and a representative of the American press behind German lines in the war-ravaged Kingdom of Yugoslavia in 1944. He was the son of Svetozar Pribićević, the renowned Serbian journalist and Yugoslav Minister of Interior.

== Biography ==
Pribichevich was born into an ethnically Serb family in Kostajnica in 1905, in the final decade of Austria-Hungary. His father came from the distinguished Pribićević family of four renowned brothers writers Adam, Milan, Vasilije (Bishop Valerijan), and Stoyan's father, who was a journalist and Yugoslav Minister of Interior Svetozar Pribićević until he was forced to go to exile in France for "not cooperating" with the Government of King Alexander I of Yugoslavia.

== Education ==
Stoyan Pribichevich graduated in political science and jurisprudence from the University of Belgrade School of Law. Upon graduation, he opened a law practice and began writing critically against The Establishment and soon followed his father's footsteps, coming into loggerheads with the Government of King Alexander I of Yugoslavia and choosing a self-imposed exile in France to be with his father. He left for Paris where his father Svetozar lived before moving to Prague where he died in 1936. In late 1934, Pribichevich decided to visit the United States and would like to make America his permanent home. After a short stay there, he went back to France to apply for an immigrant visa and, by the end of 1935, he was on his way back to America as a newcomer. He took courses to improve his English and began writing what was to become, several years later, his seminal work "World Without End". As a newcomer in New York Ciy, Pribichevich met a Cleveland manufacturer at a party who offered him a job at his Cleveland mold shop. Pribichevich accepted the manufacturer's offer. In "American Factory", which appeared in Harper's Magazine in September 1938, he found his calling as a journalist for many prominent U.S. publications.

== World War II ==
When Dame Rebecca West's travel book Black Lamb and Grey Falcon: A Journey Through Yugoslavia was published in 1941 in two volumes by Macmillan (U.K.) and Viking Press (U.S.A.), and everyone who read the work who was familiar with the country wondered who was the fictional character named "Constantine the Poet"?

After Priibchevich wrote a critical review of West's book in The Nation (8 June 1941), he concluded that Stanislav Vinaver was "Constantine". Prebichevich knew that, from 1936 to 1938, Vinaver was the press bureau chief for the Yugoslav government during the tenure of Prime Minister Milan Stojadinović. It also coincided with Rebecca West's several visits to the Balkan kingdom.

Pribichevich was among the most vociferous critics of the Yugoslav government of the 1930s, very much like his father Svetozar in his day who was forced into exile. Stoyan Pribichevich felt that the West had become a pawn for the government press bureau in Belgrade. He wrote: "The basic mistake Miss West made was to accept as her sole cicerone (talkative guide) through Yugoslavia, Stanislav Vinevar, alias "Constantine', a man who earned his living as a censor in Stoyadinovich's Press Bureau..."

In early May 1944, Stoyan Pribichevich was flown into Yugoslavia, where he landed 10 miles behind the fighting front and was taken directly to Tito's mountain hideout by Randolph Churchill, Winston Churchill's son. Pribichevich, of Time, John Talbot of Reuters, and photographers G. E. Fowler of the U.S. Navy and M. J. Slade of the British Army were the second Allied correspondents to arrive in Partisan territory. Correspondent Sargeant Walter Bernstein of the American Army publication, Yank, had already personally interviewed Tito first and was given his permission to write it, but Yank would not be allowed to publish until the pool reporters (Pribichevich, Talbot, Fowler and Slade) had returned and published their account first. A month earlier (April) war correspondent Joe Morton sent Tito a series of questions about the situation in the region, which Allied reporters had been barred from travelling to since the previous fall. Stalin-backed Tito responded, and Morton wrote a lengthy news article around those answers and submitted it to Allied censors in Algiers on 30 April 1944. But censors refused to clear the story, sparking a controversy when AP took its protests about the matter public

The situation escalated when Allied officials chose two reporters by lot in Cairo, Stoyan Pribichevich of Time and Life and John Chetwynd-Talbot of Reuters, and facilitated in-person interviews with Tito at his mountain hideout on 10 May. While Pribichevich and Talbot stories ran in news magazines days later. Stories by William Bernstein and Joe Morton's remained on hold until they were finally released for publication at a later date.

This was done when the American Army failed to get approval from the British Allied Mediterranean Command. Bernstein was escorted out of the country on the same plane that brought Pribichevich and three other newsmen. Immediately upon arrival, Pribichevich interviews Tito in Serbo-Croatian a day before the sudden German attack on Tito's Headquarters. However, Tito and his entourage were tipped off just in time by the head of the Soviet mission, General Kornoyev, and successfully managed to fly out in the cloak of darkness before the dawn raid. Meanwhile, Pribichevich, Talbot, Fowler, and Slade were captured by the Germans. It is said that Pribichevich managed to escape alone. Time magazine (26 June 1944 issue) carried the story of Pribichevich's sensational escape. He was eventually evacuated from an airfield somewhere in the vicinity of Tičevo

== Postwar career ==
Pribichevich and Louis Adamic, the founder of the United Committee of South-Slavic Americans (UCSSA), had become close friends during the late 1930s, until Adamic's tragic death in 1951.

Pribichevich's numerous left-wing political affiliations and related activities, such as being an apologist for communist Yugoslavia, went unnoticed in 1945 during the first Red Scare. It came to haunt him in the 1950s and 1960s in the second phase of the Red Scare (McCarthysm), when he was blacklisted after being quoted in American and British periodicals. Throughout the turbulent decade, however, Pribichevich managed to continue to write under various aliases for a while until the communist paranoia dissipated.

In 1967, Stoyan Pribichevich collected all his father's (Svetozar Pribićević) personal and professional correspondence and other materials, and gave it all to the archives of the Czech Academy of Sciences, the National Museum and the Office of the President of the Republic, where they were microfilmed the same year at his request. Copies of the microfilms also became holdings of the Archival Collections of Columbia University Libraries.

== Works by Stoyan Pribichevich ==
- World Without End: The Saga of Southeastern Europe, New York: Reynal and Hitchcock, First edition: 1 January 1939;
- Christmas Eve in a Balkan Heart, New York publisher: Reynal and Hitchcock, 1939;
- Living Space: The Story of South-Eastern Europe, Published in London: Heinemann, 1940;
- Macedonia: Its People and History, Universal Park, Pennsylvania State University Press, 1982, 1990.

Also: numerous other books and articles in various political publications, academic journals. and several translations, namely: "Yugoslavia's Way. The Program of the League of the Communists of Yugoslavia", Stoyan Pribichevich translator, New York: All Nations Press, 1958, 263 pp.

== Personal ==
Stoyan Pribichevich was married to the former Dorothy Dennis. They had a daughter Christina (Zorich); and a son, Stanko.
