= Podgorje =

Podgorje may refer to:

- Podgorje, Apače, a village in Slovenia
- Podgorje, Kamnik, a village in Slovenia
- Podgorje, Koper, a village in Slovenia
- Podgorje, Slovenj Gradec, a village in Slovenia
- Podgorje, Velenje, a village in Slovenia
- Podgorje (Banovići), a village in Bosnia and Herzegovina
- Podgorje, Bileća, a village in Bosnia and Herzegovina
- Podgorje, Mostar, a village in Bosnia and Herzegovina
- Podgorje (Višegrad), a village in Bosnia and Herzegovina
- Podgorje, Virovitica-Podravina County, a village near Virovitica, Croatia
- Podgorje, Dubrovnik-Neretva County, a village near Orebić, Croatia
- Podgorje, Sisak-Moslavina County, a village near Gvozd, Croatia
- Podgorje, Požega-Slavonia County, a village near Kaptol, Croatia
- Podgorje Bistričko, a village in Croatia
- Podgorje ob Sevnični, a dispersed settlement in Slovenia
- Podgorje pod Čerinom, a village in Slovenia
- Podgorje pri Letušu, a village in Slovenia
- Podgorje pri Pišecah, a village in Slovenia
