= Šljivovac =

Šljivovac may refer to:

- Šljivovac (Aerodrom), a village in Serbia
- Šljivovac (Malo Crniće), a village in Serbia
- Šljivovac, Croatia, a village in Croatia
