= 2nd Division (Yugoslav Partisans) =

Yugoslav Partisan division formed in Tičevo 1942

2nd Proletarian Division
- Flag of Democratic Federal Yugoslavia (used by the Partisans)
- Active: 1942–1945
- Country: Democratic Federal Yugoslavia
- Branch: Yugoslav Partisan Army
- Type: Infantry
- Size: 2,680 soldiers (upon formation)
- Part of: 2nd Assault Corps
- Engagements: World War II in Yugoslavia

Commanders
- Notable commanders: Peko Dapčević

The 2nd Proletarian Division (Serbo-Croatian Latin: Druga proleterska divizija) was a Yugoslav Partisan division formed in Tičevo on 1 November 1942. It was formed from 2nd Proletarian Brigade, 4th Proletarian Brigade and 2nd Dalmatia Brigade, at the time of formation it consisted of around 2,680 soldiers. The unit took part in almost all important Partisan operations. On 1 September 1943, it became part of the 2nd Assault Corps.
