= Blatuša =

Blatuša Блатуша (Serbian)
- Village
- Location of Blatuša in Croatia
- Country: Croatia
- Region: Continental Croatia
- County: Sisak-Moslavina County
- Municipality: Gvozd

Area
  - Total: 22.6 km^{2} (8.7 sq mi)
- Elevation: 212 m (696 ft)

Population (2021)
  - Total: 138
  - Density: 6.11/km^{2} (15.8/sq mi)
- Time zone: UTC+1 (CET)
  - Summer (DST): UTC+2 (CEST)
- Postal code: 44410 Vrginmost
- Area code: (+385) 44

Blatuša (Serbian Cyrillic: Блатуша) is a village in central Croatia, in the municipality of Gvozd, Sisak-Moslavina County. It is connected by the D6 highway.

== Demographics ==
According to the 2011 census, the village of Blatuša has 171 inhabitants. This represents 30.65% of its pre-war population according to the 1991 census.

According to the 1991 census, 98.03% of the village population were ethnic Serbs (547/558),0.90% were Yugoslavs (5/558), and 1.07% were of other ethnic origin (6/558).

Population change 1857-2011:
v

population	850	791	777	957	1100	1231	1132	1215	886	908	898	796	655	558	285	171
	1857	1869	1880	1890	1900	1910	1921	1931	1948	1953	1961	1971	1981	1991	2001	2011

Sources: Croatian Bureau of Statistics publications

== Notable people ==
- Pavle Jakšić - Serbian partisan
