= Čremušnica =

Čremušnica Чремушница (Serbian)
- Village
- Location of Čremušnica in Croatia
- Coordinates: 45°26′46″N 15°55′42″E
- Country: Croatia
- Region: Continental Croatia
- County: Sisak-Moslavina
- Municipality: Gvozd

Area
  - Total: 7.5 km^{2} (2.9 sq mi)
- Elevation: 180 m (590 ft)

Population (2021)
  - Total: 72
  - Density: 9.6/km^{2} (25/sq mi)
- Time zone: UTC+1 (CET)
  - Summer (DST): UTC+2 (CEST)
- Postal code: 44410 Gvozd
- Area code: (+385) 44

Čremušnica (Serbian Cyrillic: Чремушница) is a village in central Croatia, in the municipality of Gvozd, Sisak-Moslavina County. It is connected by the D6 highway.

== Demographics ==
According to the 2011 census, the village of Čremušnica has 103 inhabitants. This represents 26.41% of its pre-war population according to the 1991 census.

According to the 1991 census, 92.56% of the village population were ethnic Serbs (361/390), 6.41% were ethnic Croats (25/390), 0.77% were Yugoslavs (3/390), while 0.26% were of other ethnic origin (1/390).

Population change 1857-2011
v

population	472	597	613	731	823	841	786	850	666	669	595	543	456	390	85	103
	1857	1869	1880	1890	1900	1910	1921	1931	1948	1953	1961	1971	1981	1991	2001	2011

Sources: Croatian Bureau of Statistics publications
