= Kostajnica Fortress =

Castle in Croatia

- Tvrđava Zrinski
- Hrvatska Kostajnica in Croatia
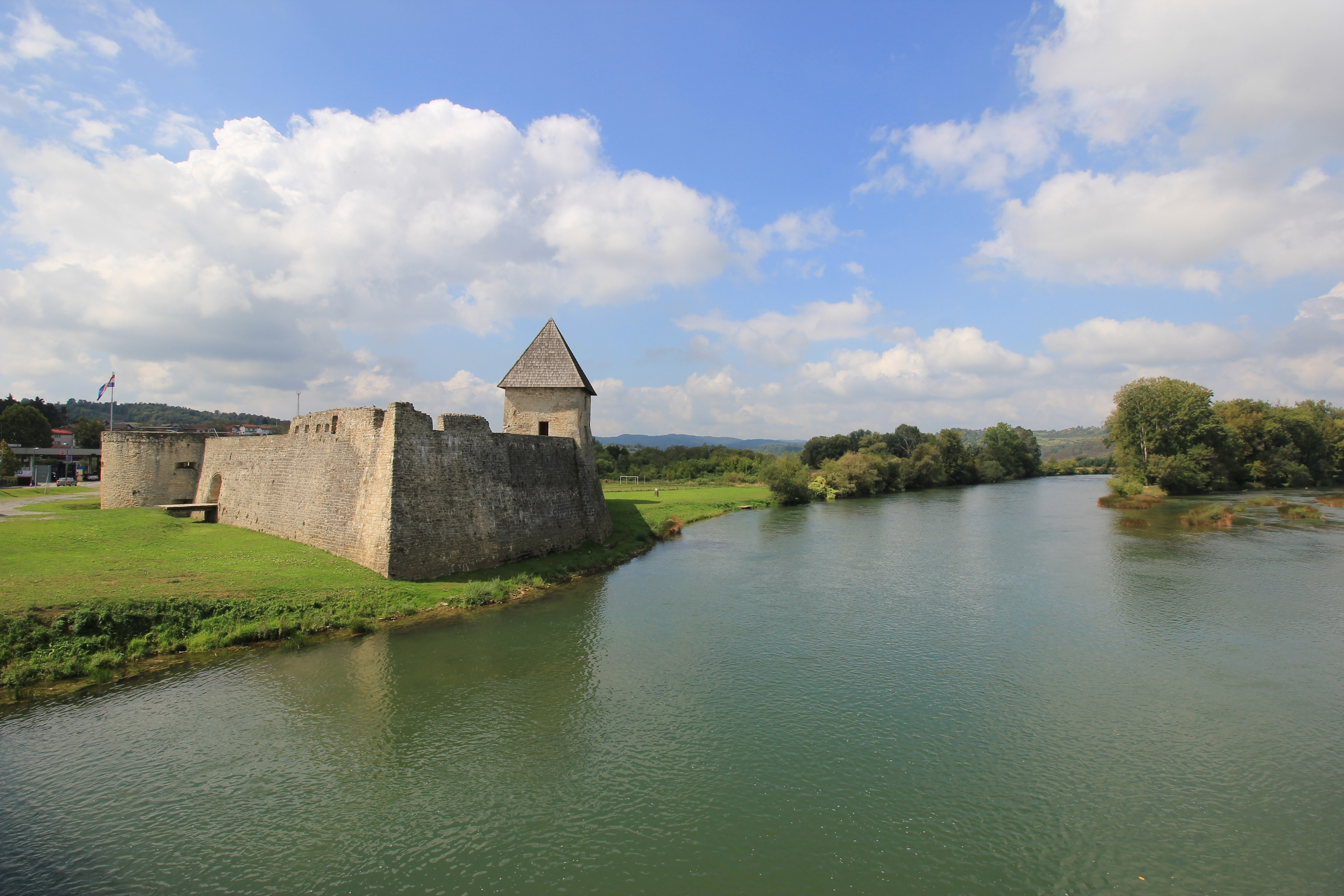

Site information
- Type: Fortification

Location
- Coordinates: 45°13′16″N 16°32′50″E

Site history
- Materials: Stone

Kostajnica Fortress is a castle in Hrvatska Kostajnica, a town in central Croatia, near the border to Bosnia and Herzegovina.

The fortress was built most probably in the 14th century and owned by the members of the noble families Frankopan, Lipovečki, Tot, Benvenjud and finally (in the 16th century) Zrinski, so it is today also known as "Zrinski fortress" or "Zrinski castle" (Croatian: Stari grad Zrinski). It was conquered by the Ottomans on 17 July 1556, remaining under Ottoman rule until 1688.

Situated on the banks of the river Una, the fortress has very strong walls and three towers. Having been in a state of disrepair before, it has been renewed in recent years by the Croatian Ministry of Culture.

== Sources ==
- Kruhek, Milan (2001). "Kostajnica u protuturskoj obrani Hrvatskoga Kraljevstva" [Kostajnica in the Anti-Turkish defense of the Croatian Kingdom] (PDF). Povijesni prilozi (in Croatian). 20 (21). Croatian Institute of History: 71–97.
- Miletić, Drago; Valjato Fabris, Marija (2011). "Stari grad u Hrvatskoj Kostajnici. Konzervatorsko-restauratorski radovi do završne prezentacije" [Old Town in Kostajnica: conservation and restoration works – from the onset to the final presentation] (PDF). Portal (in Croatian) (2). Croatian Conservation Institute: 35–53.
- Nadilo, Branko (2003). "Stari grad na unskom otoku u Kostajnici" [Old town on the Una island in Kostajnica] (PDF). Građevinar (in Croatian). 55 (6). Croatian Association of Civil Engineers: 363–369.
