= Golinja =

Golinja Голиња (Serbian)
- Village
- Location of Golinja in Croatia
- Coordinates: 45°29′N 16°01′E
- Country: Croatia
- Region: Continental Croatia
- County: Sisak-Moslavina County
- Municipality: Gvozd

Area
  - Total: 6.7 km^{2} (2.6 sq mi)
- Elevation: 187 m (614 ft)

Population (2021)
  - Total: 19
  - Density: 2.8/km^{2} (7.3/sq mi)
- Time zone: UTC+1 (CET)
  - Summer (DST): UTC+2 (CEST)
- Postal code: 44410
- Area code: (+385) 44

Golinja (Serbian Cyrillic: Голиња) is a village in central Croatia, in the municipality of Gvozd, Sisak-Moslavina County. It is connected by the D6 highway.

== Demographics ==
According to the 2011 census, the village of Golinja has 38 inhabitants. This represents 14.07% of its pre-war population according to the 1991 census.

According to the 1991 census, 73.33% of the village population were ethnic Serbs (198/270), 26.30% were ethnic Croats (71/270), while 0.37% were of other ethnic origin (1/270).

Population change 1857-2011
v

population	586	528	434	542	573	570	598	747	621	497	482	416	360	270	65	38
	1857	1869	1880	1890	1900	1910	1921	1931	1948	1953	1961	1971	1981	1991	2001	2011

Sources: Croatian Bureau of Statistics publications
