= Valerijan Pribićević =

Valerijan Pribićević (Serbian Cyrillic: Валеријан Прибићевић; 25 April 1870 – 10 July 1941) was a prominent vicar bishop of the Serbian Orthodox Church at Sremski Karlovci during the latter part of the 19th- and the beginning of the 20th-century. He died in Split after the Nazi-occupation of the Kingdom of Yugoslavia on 6 April 1941.

== Life ==
Bishop Valerijan's secular name was Vasilije Pribićević, born on 25 April 1870 in the village of Dubica, near Kostanjica, to a well-known Serbian family in what was then Austria-Hungary. Valerijan had three younger brothers: Svetozar Pribićević, Milan Pribićević, and Adam Pribićević.

Vasilije Pribićević graduated from high school with honors in Rakovec near Karlovac, and the Kiev Theological Academy in Kiev, then part of Imperial Russia. After two years of teaching at the Monastic School in the Novo Hopovo Monastery, he became a monk on 8 May 1894 in the Krušedol Monastery and was given the name Valerijan.

From 1897 to 1899, Valerijan Pribićević was a teacher at the Serbian Gymnasium in Constantinople. He was dismissed from service because he refused to sign a congratulatory telegram on the occasion of King Milan's return to the Kingdom of Serbia. Later, he took post-graduate Greek and Byzantine studies at Vienna and Leipzig, and upon his return, he was appointed professor at the old Karlovci Theological Seminary.

Pribićević was one of the Serbs arrested and tried in Zagreb in what became known as the Agram Trial; thirty-one Serbs of the fifty-two arrested were sentenced to jail terms, among them Valerijan and Adam Pribićević, who each received 12 years in prison. Along with the rest, both Valerijan and Adam were finally released from prison after the abolition of the penal colony in 1910.

In 1914, before the war broke out, the Austrian authorities were harassing the then-ruling Croat-Serb Coalition in Croatia that sought better conditions for its constituent people. Politician and writer Svetozar Pribićević was first arrested, as was his older brother Valerijan. They were both eventually released after being interrogated.

After the Great War (from 1918), Valerijan was regularly elected as a member of parliament of the new Kingdom of Serbs, Croats and Slovenes, until 6 January 1929 when King Alexander I dissolved the National Assembly and abrogated the Vidovdan Constitution after Serbian and Croatian parties in Croatia refused to cooperate in governing the country. The king attempted to unify the nation by suppressing political parties based on ethnicity; this later led to the renaming of the country -- Yugoslavia—on 3 October 1929. Valerijan's brother Svetozar Pribićević, along with Croatians Vlatko Maček and a churchman Fran Barac played a role in provoking the monarch to take such drastic measures, and among other cumulative factors as well.

For many years, Archimandrite Valerijan was the abbot of the Jazak Monastery and as such was elected vicar bishop of Srem on 8 December 1939. He was ordained bishop on 28 January 1940.

Vicar Bishop Valerijan (Pribićević) died on 10 July 1941 in Split, where he was temporarily buried in the tomb of his friend Miloš Jelaska. After the Second World War, more precisely in 1959, he was transferred to the Jazak Monastery and buried near the monastery church.

In August 1941, General Heinrich Dankelmann, commanding the German occupation troops in Serbia, received an urgent letter written in early July of that year by Bishop Valerijan before he died. He gave an alarming account concerning wanton atrocities committed by Ante Pavelić's Ustashi on the constituent population in the Independent State of Croatia, mentioning the concentration camps at Jasenovac.

== See also ==
- Svetozar Pribićević
- Milan Pribićević
- Adam Pribićević
- Stoyan Pribichevich (son of Svetozar Pribićević)

== Literature ==
- Krestić, Vasilije (1991). History of Serbs in Croatia and Slavonia 1848–1914. Belgrade: Politika.
- Pribićević, Stojan (1991) On the Pribićevićs, Collection of Works: Dvor na Una, from Pre-Slavic Times to Our Days, Dvor na Una 1991.
- Sava, Bishop of Šumadija (1996). SERBIAN HIERARCHS from the 9th to the 20th Century, Belgrade: EVRO.
