= Brnjavac =

Brnjavac Брњавац (Serbian)
- Village
- Location of Brnjavac in Croatia
- Coordinates: 45°19′N 15°55′E
- Country: Croatia
- Region: Central and Eastern (Pannonian) Croatia
- County: Sisak-Moslavina County
- Municipality: Gvozd

Area
  - Total: 6.0 km^{2} (2.3 sq mi)
- Elevation: 181 m (594 ft)

Population (2021)
  - Total: 49
  - Density: 8.2/km^{2} (21/sq mi)
- Time zone: UTC+1 (CET)
  - Summer (DST): UTC+2 (CEST)
- Postal code: 44410
- Area code: (+385) 44

Brnjavac (Serbian Cyrillic: Брњавац) is a village in central Croatia, in the municipality of Gvozd, Sisak-Moslavina County. It is connected by the D6 highway.

== Demographics ==
According to the 2011 census, the village of Brnjavac has 161 inhabitants. This represents 43.06% of its pre-war population according to the 1991 census.

Population change 1857–2011
v

| population | 350 | 341 | 298 | 342 | 347 | 424 | 374 | 439 | 427 | 445 | 424 | 356 | 264 | 216 | 87 | 93 |
| | 1857 | 1869 | 1880 | 1890 | 1900 | 1910 | 1921 | 1931 | 1948 | 1953 | 1961 | 1971 | 1981 | 1991 | 2001 | 2011 |

Sources: Croatian Bureau of Statistics publications
