= Trepča, Sisak-Moslavina County =

Trepča Трепча (Serbian)
- Village
- Location of Trepča in Croatia
- Coordinates: 45°28′08″N 15°54′50″E
- Country: Croatia
- Region: Central and Eastern (Pannonian) Croatia
- County: Sisak-Moslavina County
- Municipality: Gvozd

Area
  - Total: 3.4 km^{2} (1.3 sq mi)
- Elevation: 167 m (548 ft)

Population (2021)
  - Total: 5
  - Density: 1.5/km^{2} (3.8/sq mi)
- Time zone: UTC+1 (CET)
  - Summer (DST): UTC+2 (CEST)
- Postal codes: 44410
- Area code: (+385) 44

Trepča (Serbian Cyrillic: Трепча) is a village in central Croatia, in the municipality of Gvozd, Sisak-Moslavina County. It is connected by the D6 highway.

== History ==
As evidenced by the remains of a medieval church in Crkvište under the cemetery, the location was already inhabited in the Middle Ages. The village of Trepča, like many settlements in the area, grew in the late 17th century when Orthodox Serbs from Bosnia settled there. The village became a part of the Military Frontier which, at the time, was expanding onto former Ottoman territories such as Lika, Kordun, Banija and lower Slavonia.

== Demographics ==
According to the 2011 census, the village of Trepča has 5 inhabitants. This represents 4.10% of its pre-war population according to the 1991 census.

Population by ethnicity

Year of census	total	Serbs	Croats	Yugoslavs	others
2011	5	n/a	n/a	-	n/a
2001	9	n/a	n/a	-	n/a
1991	122	121 (99.18%)	-	-	1 (0.82%)
1981	133	123 (92.48%)	-	8 (6.02%)	2 (1.50%)
1971	149	145 (97.32%)	-	4 (2.68%)	-

Population change 1857-2011
v

population	141	172	176	226	239	215	207	239	142	186	187	149	133	122	9	5
	1857	1869	1880	1890	1900	1910	1921	1931	1948	1953	1961	1971	1981	1991	2001	2011

Sources: Croatian Bureau of Statistics publications
