= Crevarska Strana =

Crevarska Strana Цреварска Страна (Serbian)
- Village
- Location of Crevarska Strana in Croatia
- Coordinates: 45°21′04″N 15°49′23″E
- Country: Croatia
- Region: Continental Croatia
- County: Sisak-Moslavina
- Municipality: Gvozd

Area
  - Total: 14.5 km^{2} (5.6 sq mi)
- Elevation: 174 m (571 ft)

Population (2021)
  - Total: 101
  - Density: 6.97/km^{2} (18.0/sq mi)
- Time zone: UTC+1 (CET)
  - Summer (DST): UTC+2 (CEST)
- Postal code: 44410 Gvozd
- Area code: (+385) 44

Crevarska Strana (Serbian Cyrillic: Цреварска Страна) is a village in central Croatia, in the municipality of Gvozd, Sisak-Moslavina County. Between 1953 and 1971, the village was known as Vladimirovo (named after Croatian poet and politician Vladimir Nazor). It is connected by the D6 highway.

== History ==
Like other settlements in the area, Crevarska Strana settlement was established in the late 17th century to become a part of the Military Frontier which, at the time, was expanding onto former Ottoman territories such as Lika, Kordun, Banija and lower Slavonia. In the 18th century, it belonged to the Glina regiment. The development of the Vrginmost-Karlovac railway line in 1905 was important for the development of the village as it both provided employment (i.e. railway maintenance work) and allowed residents to seek employment and engage in trade further afield. In 1918, the village became a part of the Serbian-Croatian-Slovenian Kingdom and later on, the Kingdom of Yugoslavia.

The village suffered heavy demographic losses in the World war II losing nearly 37% (155 men and 37 women) of its pre-war population of 521. Out of 135 civilian victims of fascism, 68 (all men) perished in the Glina massacre on 3 August 1941, with another 16 perishing in the Ivanović Jarak massacre. The first civilian victims lost their lives already in May 1941 perishing in the Jadovno concentration camp. After being heavily hit by brutal Ustaše campaign in late spring and summer 1941, the population joined the antifascist resistance movement en masse.

== Demographics ==
According to the 2011 census, the village of Crevarska Strana has 161 inhabitants. This represents 37.88% of its pre-war population according to the 1991 census.

Population by ethnicity

Year of census	total	Serbs	Croats	Yugoslavs	others
2011	161	127 (78.88%)	32 (19.88%)	-	2 (1.24%)
2001	262	n/a	n/a	-	n/a
1991	425	404 (95.06%)	5 (1.17%)	9 (2.12%)	7 (1.65%)
1981	469	441 (94.03%)	7 (1.49%)	14 (2.99%)	7 (1.49%)
1971	515	505 (98.06%)	6 (1.17%)	-	4 (0.77%)
1961	530	530 (100%)	-	-	-

Population change 1857-2011
v

population							171			543	530	515	469	425	262	161
	1857	1869	1880	1890	1900	1910	1921	1931	1948	1953	1961	1971	1981	1991	2001	2011

Sources: Croatian Bureau of Statistics publications

NOTE: Data for the village of Crevarska Strana is reported from 1921 on. From 1953 to 1971, data is reported under the name of Vladimirovo. Data from the 1931 and 1948 censuses is contained in data for Vrginmost settlement.

== Sights ==
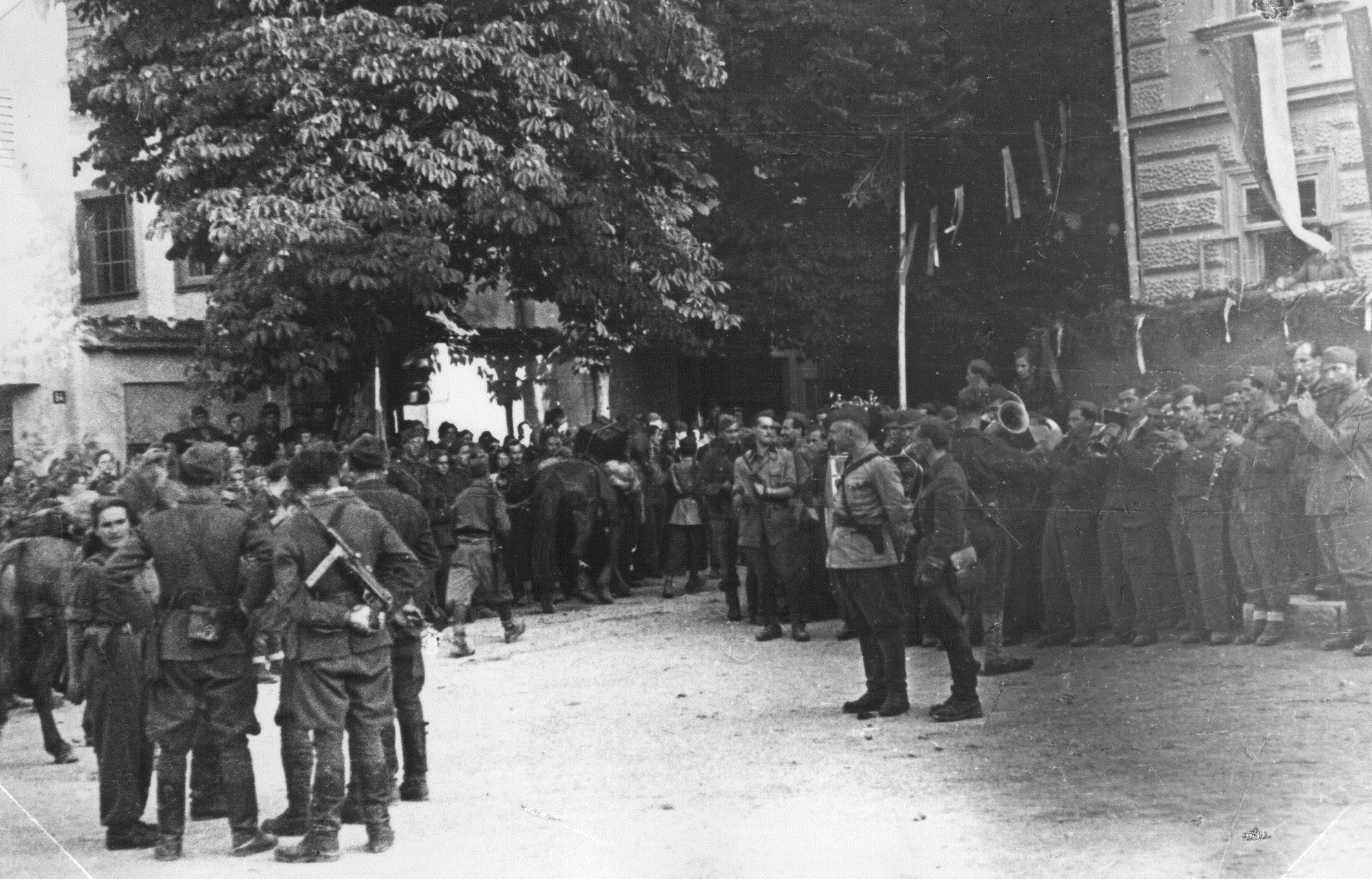
Partisans of the 8th Kordun Division arriving in Črnomelj, Slovenia, on 18 August 1944

- The site of formation of the partisan 8th Kordun Division(8. Kordunaška udarna divizija) on 22 November 1942.
- Monument to the uprising of the people of Kordun and Banija
