= Hrvatska Kostajnica =

- Town
- Grad Hrvatska Kostajnica; Town of Hrvatska Kostajnica
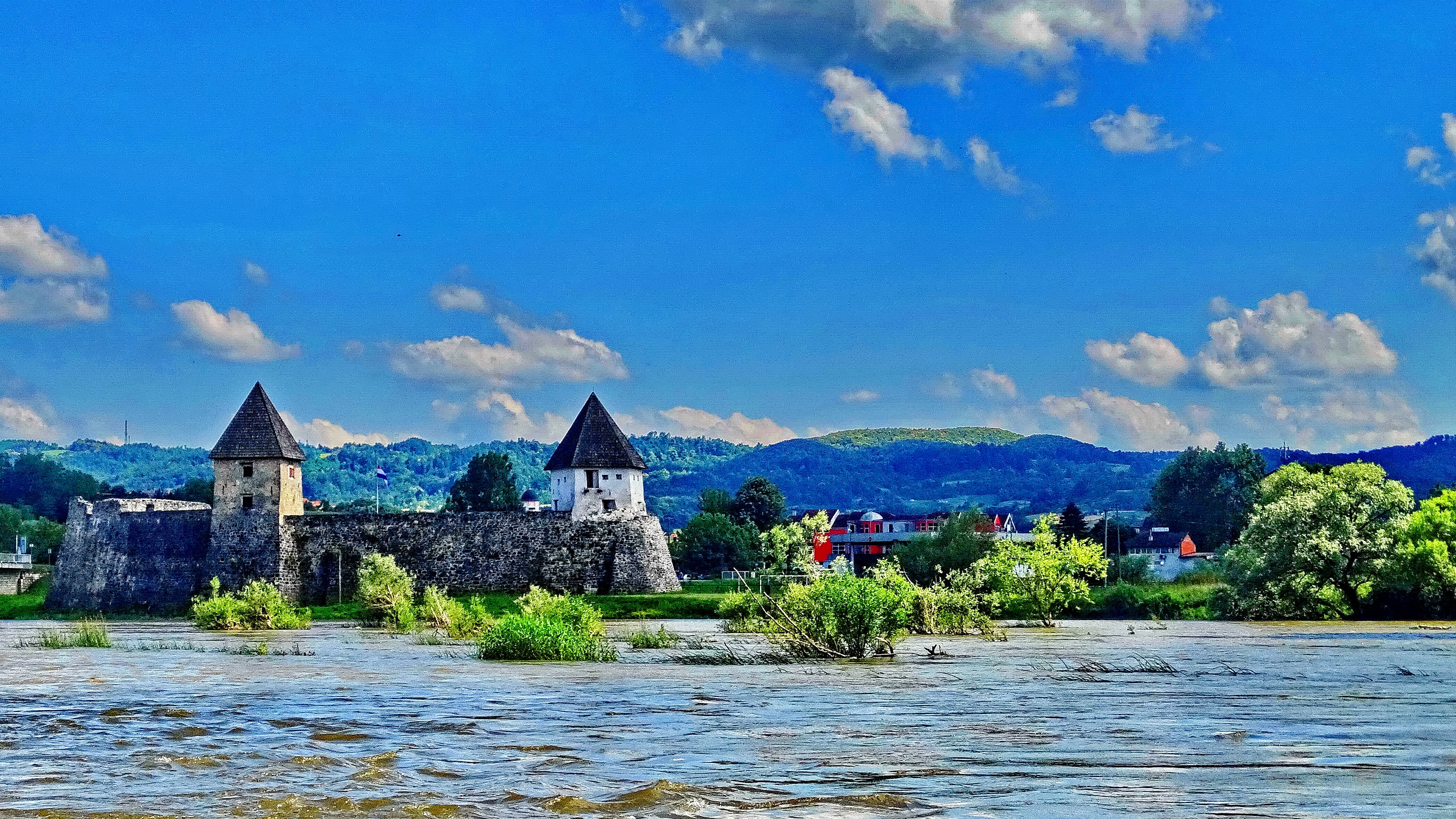
- Fortress Kostajnica and Una River
- Interactive map of Hrvatska Kostajnica
- Location in Croatia
- Coordinates: 45°14′N 16°32′E
- Country: Croatia
- Region: Central Croatia (Banovina)
- County: Sisak-Moslavina County

Government
  - Mayor: Dalibor Bišćan (HDZ)

Area
  - Town: 52.5 km^{2} (20.3 sq mi)
  - Urban: 10.2 km^{2} (3.9 sq mi)

Population (2021)
  - Town: 1,879
  - Density: 35.8/km^{2} (92.7/sq mi)
  - Urban: 1,439
  - Urban density: 141/km^{2} (365/sq mi)
- Time zone: UTC+1 (CET)
  - Summer (DST): UTC+2 (CEST)
- Website: hrvatska-kostajnica.hr

Hrvatska Kostajnica (pronounced [xř̩ʋaːtskaː kǒstaːjnit͡sa]; German: Castanowitz; Italian: Costainizza), also referred to as simply Kostajnica, is a town in central Croatia. It is located on the Una river in the Sisak-Moslavina County, south of Petrinja and Sisak and across the river from Kostajnica in Bosnia and Herzegovina. In the past, Hrvatska Kostajnica was called by different names, Koztainicha, Kaztanicha to Costgnanica. The name most likely comes from the word Kostanj (chestnut).

== Climate ==
Since records began in 1981, the highest temperature recorded at the local weather station was 39.4 °C (102.9 °F), on 18 July 2007. The coldest temperature was −22.0 °C (−7.6 °F), on 13 February 1985.

== History ==
=== Middle Ages ===
Kostajnica was first mentioned in the document by knights templar from 1240. This year is used as official birth year of this historic town. Its name is derived from the word kostanj ("chestnut"), as the nearby hills around the Una river are covered with forests of chestnut trees.

Time of the first settlement is unknown, but town lies on very important Roman roads that were used for transporting salt and cotton. Since Roman roads were merged in the vicinity of the city it is believed that settlement dates much earlier than the first written document known today. Position of town is very similar to the town from old Roman documents known as “Oeneum”. Five Roman milestones were located in the city dating back to the 3rd century A.D.

During 13th and 14th century, Kostajnica became a fortification (kaštel) that was built as a protection against the invading Ottoman Empire. The owners of the fortification were members of the noble families Lipovečki, Tot, Frankopan, Benvenjud and finally Zrinski, so the castle is today also known as Zrinski castle (Stari grad Zrinski in Croatian). Other forts existing during that period were in the surrounding villages of Komogovina, Svinica, and Prevršac. After, Commander of the Hrvatska Kostajnica was Prince and Duke Luke Novosel of Transleithania (House of Novosel) (Croatia and Slavonia part).

=== Ottoman rule ===
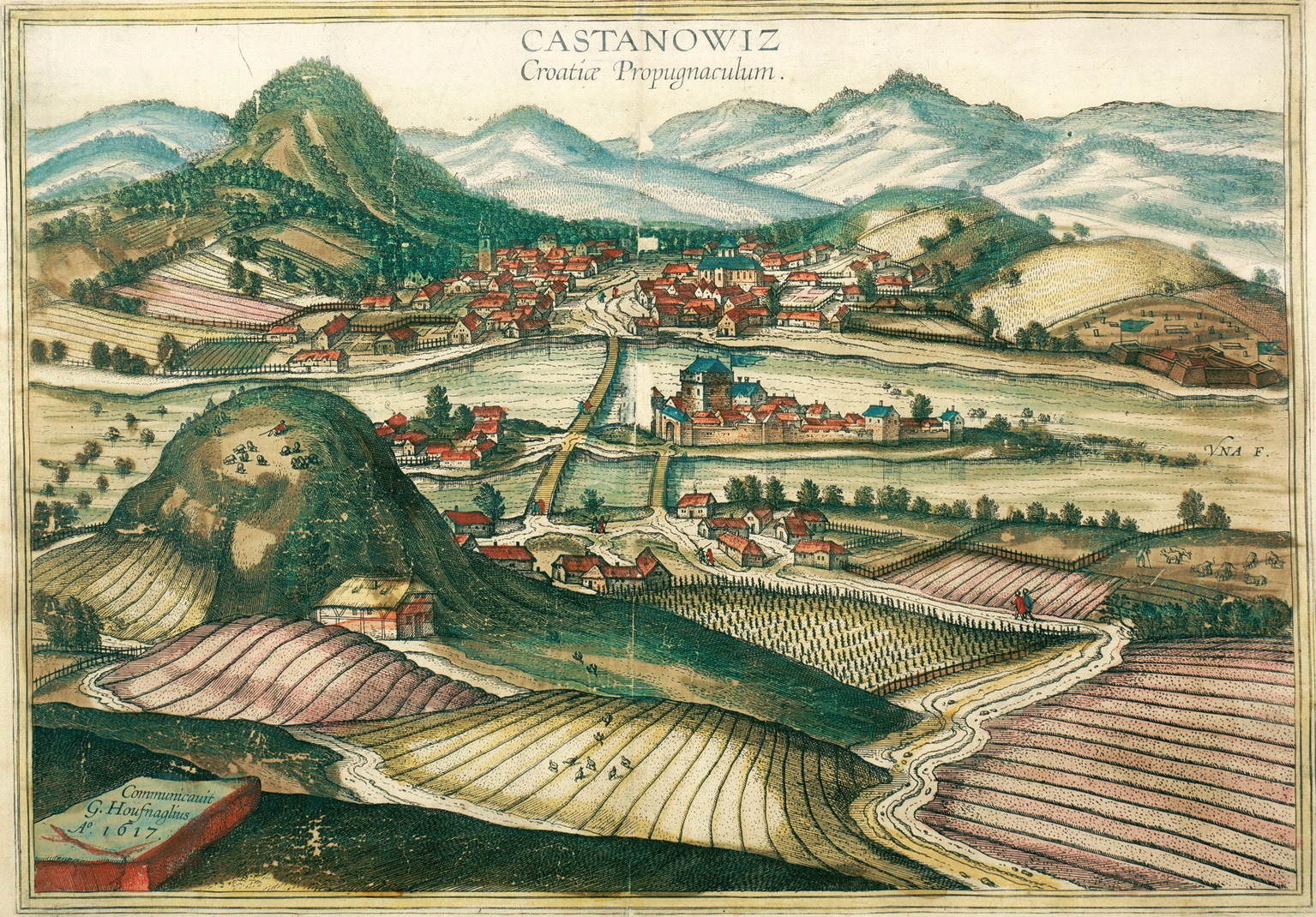
Hrvatska Kostajnica in 1617 (by Georg Hoefnagel)

The Ottoman 1537 offensive against Kostajnica and Dubica ended in Ottoman defeat in a battle near Jasenovac. They nevertheless conquered Dubica in 1538, and conducted raids in the Kostajnica area in 1539, failing to capture any of the forts, but causing widespread destruction. Attempts to capture Kostajnica were repeated in 1550 and 1552. Finally, in 1556 the Ottoman army, led by Malkoč-beg, captured Kostajnica after a one-day siege.

After capturing the town, the Ottomans invested heavily in maintaining the fortifications, and kept a strong military contingent, making Kostajnica – alongside Bihać – their most important stronghold in the area. In the following decades, Kostajnica was a starting point for Ottoman offensive operations. The crushing Ottoman defeat in the Battle of Sisak in 1593, however, marked the turning point in the ongoing conflict, after which Kostajnica was no longer safe from recapture.

In 1596, a well-organized attempt by generals Sigismund Herberstein and Juraj Lenković with 6,000 troops ended in failure. The attackers encountered heavily fortified defensive positions and – having no artillery and receiving news about incoming Ottoman reinforcements – decided to withdraw. Raids in 1624 and 1651 were again successful in dispersing the Ottoman troops, but failed to capture the fortress. Kostajnica was finally taken in 1688, by the army of Louis William, Margrave of Baden-Baden joined with the troops led by ban Nikola Erdödy. The attacking force, equipped with 15 cannons, was able to reach strategic positions around the Ottoman fortress without encountering significant resistance. On the third day of the operation, they seized the fortress after an artillery attack.

=== 18th century to present ===
During the early 18th century two schools are opened in the city. One school was operated by Catholic Missionary Church of “St. Antun Padovinski”, while the second schools was run as a Serbian Public School. Kostajnica is known for its natural springs such as; Varoški Bunar, Mrzlenac, Tekija, Pekinac, Paunovac, Angelovac, and Tutulovac. The most popular spring Tekija has engraved sign (drink brother, potion was given to you by the god's mercy) “Pi brate iz Božje milosti dat ti je napitak.”

In the late 19th and early 20th century, Kostajnica was a district capital in the Zagreb County of the Kingdom of Croatia-Slavonia.

During World War II, the town was occupied by Axis troops and was included into the Pavelić's Independent State of Croatia (NDH). The fascist Ustashe regime committed the Genocide of the Serbs and the Holocaust. Between 29 and 37 July 1941, 280 Serbs were killed and thrown into pits near Kostajnica. The town was bombed by American forces on May 30, 1944.

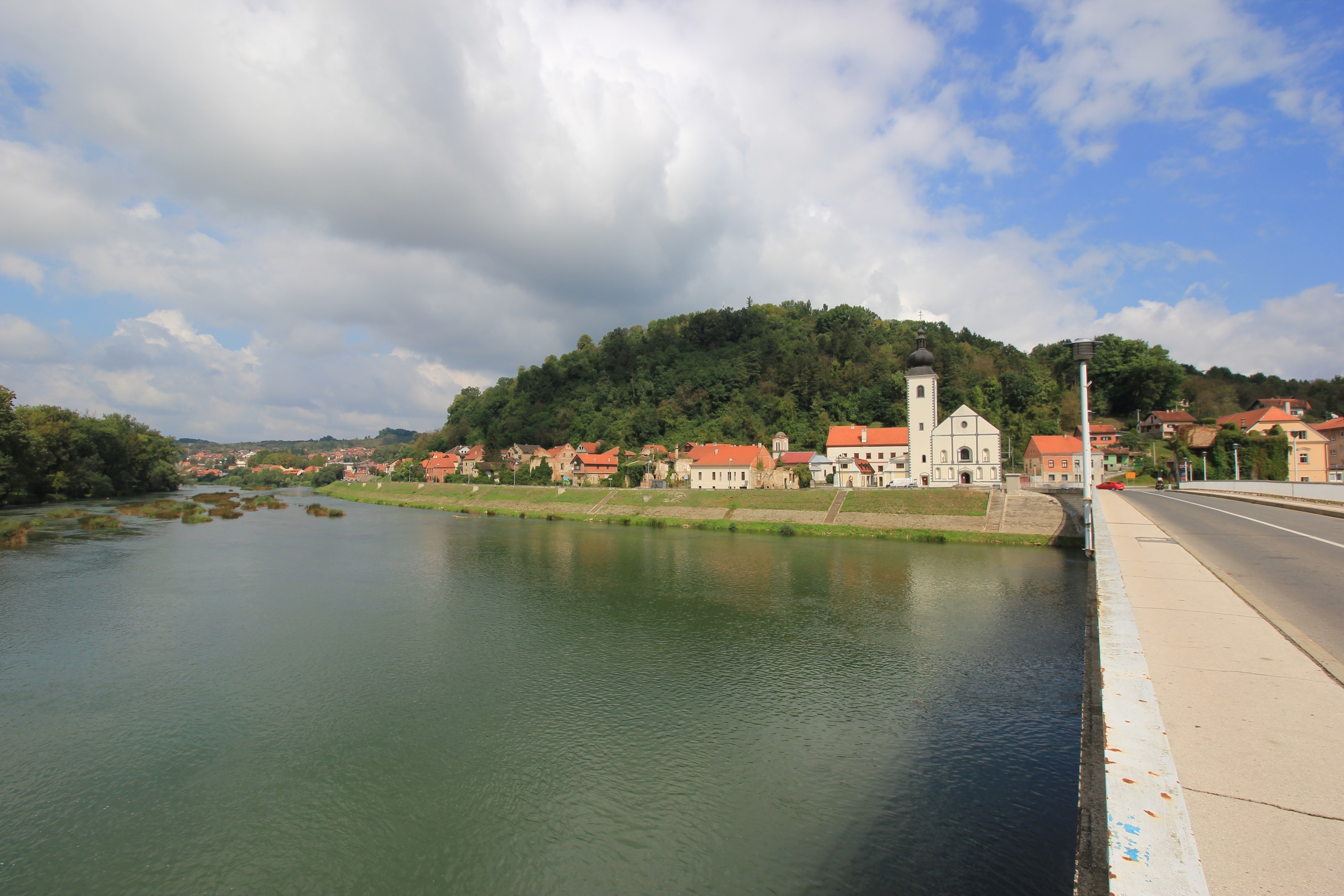
View of the town

Kostajnica suffered greatly during the Croatian War of Independence. A large part of the Croatian population were expelled or killed by rebel Serbs in 1991 and the city was incorporated into the Republic of Serbian Krajina. Houses and buildings belonging to Croats were burned and looted, including the baroque church, the medieval apothecary, and the eighteenth-century Franciscan monastery. The only piece of the city's cultural heritage left was the castle by the river built by the Frankopans. Kostajnica was put back in Croatian control following military victories by the army in August 1995, and the Croat population expelled slowly began returning.

== Population ==
The municipality population of 2,756 is composed of the following settlements:

- Čukur, population 114
- Hrvatska Kostajnica, population 2,127
- Panjani, population 125
- Rausovac, population 28
- Rosulje, population 192
- Selište Kostajničko, population 102
- Utolica, population 68
Town of Hrvatska Kostajnica: Population trends 1857–2021
v

population	3377	3178	3651	3458	3690	4000	3724	4121	3940	4226	4211	4453	4720	4996	2746	2756	1879
	1857	1869	1880	1890	1900	1910	1921	1931	1948	1953	1961	1971	1981	1991	2001	2011	2021

Sources: Croatian Bureau of Statistics publications

In the 2011 population census, Croats made up 69.34% of the municipal population and Serbs were 25.04%.

Population of Hrvatska Kostajnica town by ethnicity

Year of census	total	Croats	Serbs	Yugoslavs	others
2011	2,756	1,911 (69.34%)	690 (25.04%)	-	155 (5.62%)
2001	2,746	2,115 (77.02%)	433 (15.77%)	-	198 (7.21%)
1991	3,480	1,087 (31.23%)	1,889 (54.28%)	264 (7.58%)	240 (6.89%)
1981	3,159	1,023 (32.38%)	1,374 (43.49%)	639 (20.22%)	123 (3.89%)
1971	2,431	1,120 (46.07%)	1,104 (45.41%)	110 (4.52%)	97 (3.99%)

== Politics ==
=== Minority councils and representatives ===
Directly elected minority councils and representatives are tasked with consulting tasks for the local or regional authorities in which they are advocating for minority rights and interests, integration into public life and participation in the management of local affairs. At the 2023 Croatian national minorities councils and representatives elections Serbs of Croatia fulfilled legal requirements to elect 15 members minority council of the Town of Hrvatska Kostajnica.

== Economy ==
Today, chief occupations are farming, leather (footwear), textiles plant, printing, and wood processing mill. Fishing and hunting are very important tourist attractions in the city with some of the best natural habitats found in this part of Europe. Hrvatska Kostajnica is underdeveloped municipality which is statistically classified as the First Category Area of Special State Concern by the Government of Croatia.

== Notable natives and residents ==
- Svetozar Boroević (1856–1920) - Austro-Hungarian Field Marshal
- Milislav Demerec (1895–1966) - geneticist, former director of the Cold Spring Harbor Laboratory
- Adam Pribićević (1880–1957) - publisher, writer, and politician
- Milan Pribićević (1877–1937) - politician
- Svetozar Pribićević (1875–1936) - politician
- Antun Vakanović (1808–1894) - politician and Ban of Croatia
- Nikola Nina Maraković (1912–1943) - antifascist and People's Hero of Yugoslavia

== Bibliography ==
- Kruhek, Milan (2001). "Kostajnica u protuturskoj obrani Hrvatskoga Kraljevstva" [Kostajnica in the Anti-Turkish defense of the Croatian Kingdom] (PDF). Povijesni prilozi (in Croatian). 20 (21). Croatian Institute of History: 71–97.
- Slukan-Altić, Mirela (2007). "Razvoj i prostorna organizacija srednjovjekovne Kostajnice" [The Development and Spatial Organisation of Medieval Kostajnica] (PDF). Zbornik Odsjeka za povijesne znanosti Zavoda za povijesne i društvene znanosti Hrvatske akademije znanosti i umjetnosti (in Croatian). 25. Croatian Academy of Sciences and Arts: 1–23.
- Tanner, Marcus, Croatia: Yale University Press, 1997.
