= Gvozd =

Gvozd Гвозд (Serbian)
- Općina Gvozd; Municipality of Gvozd
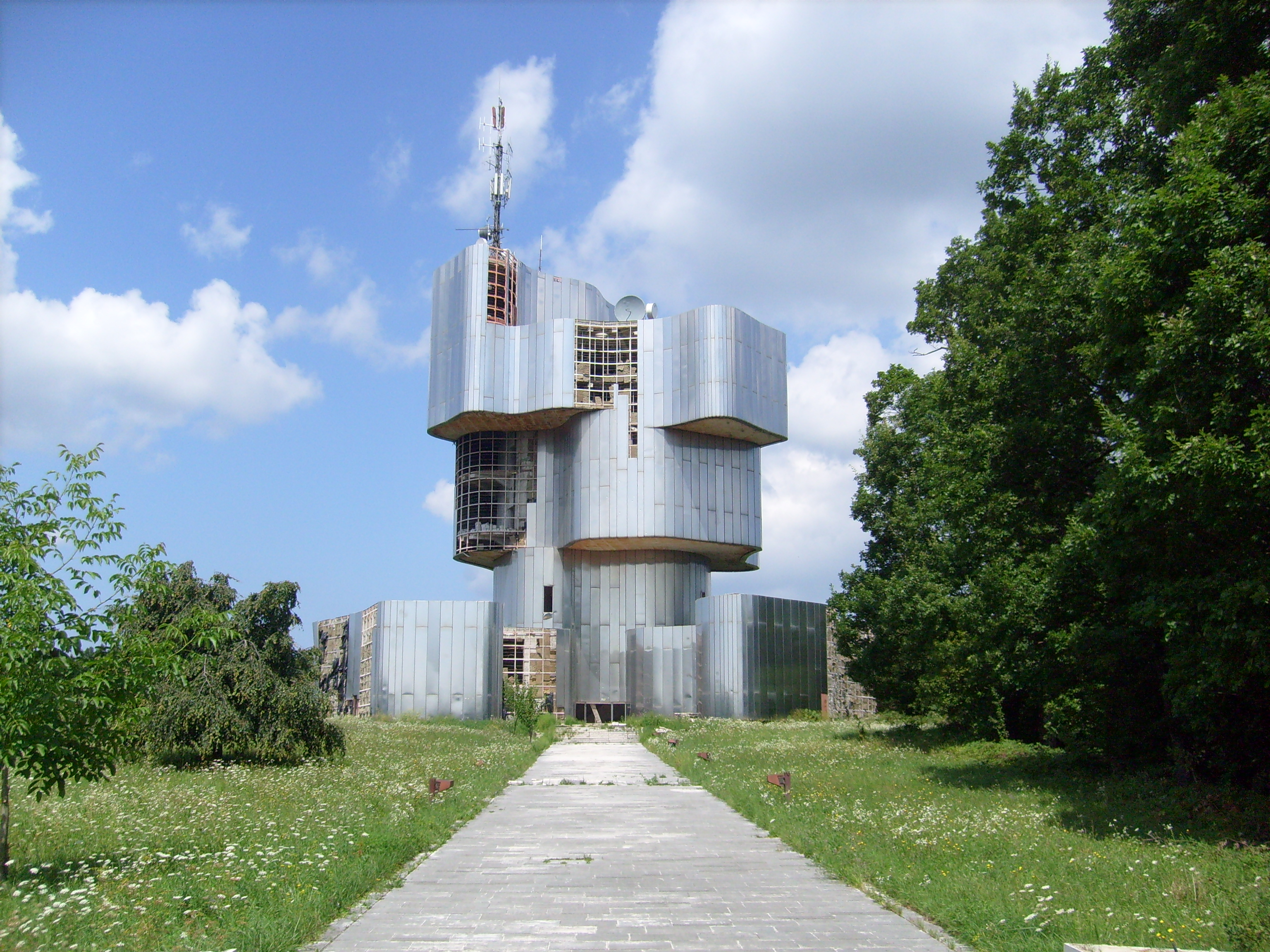
- Monument to the Uprising of the People of Kordun and Banija

- Coat of arms
- Interactive map of Gvozd
- Location in Croatia
- Coordinates: 45°21′09″N 15°51′54″E
- Country: Croatia
- Region: Central Croatia
- County: Sisak-Moslavina County

Government
  - Municipal mayor: Milan Vrga (SDSS)

Area
  - Total: 212.4 km^{2} (82.0 sq mi)
- Elevation: 131 m (430 ft)

Population (2021)
  - Total: 2,047
  - Density: 9.637/km^{2} (24.96/sq mi)
- Time zone: UTC+1 (CET)
  - Summer (DST): UTC+2 (CEST)
- Postal code: (+385) 44
- Area code: (+385)044
- Website: gvozd.hr

Gvozd (Serbian Cyrillic: Гвозд) is a municipality in central Croatia, Sisak-Moslavina County. Its seat is located in Vrginmost (Вргинмост), which was renamed to Gvozd from 1996–2012. It is an underdeveloped municipality which is statistically classified as the First Category Area of Special State Concern by the Government of Croatia.

== Languages and names ==
Croatian is the official first language. Serbian language with its Cyrillic alphabet is the officially recognised second language. As of 2023, most of the legal requirements for the fulfillment of bilingual standards have not been carried out. Official buildings do have Cyrillic signage, but not street signs, traffic signs or seals. Cyrillic is not used on any official documents, nor are there public legal and administrative employees proficient in the script.

In Cyrillic, Vrginmost is known as Вргинмост and (between 1996 and 2012) Gvozd as Гвозд.

== History ==
In 1097, the last native Croatian King Petar Snačić was killed here during the Battle of Gvozd Mountain, which led to the mountain being renamed Petrova Gora. It was ruled by Ottoman Empire between 1536 and 1691 as part of Bosnia Eyalet.

The village of Vrginmost has existed since 1688, when it was part of the Military Region. According to the census of 1850, Gvozd had 30 houses and 341 inhabitants, and according to the census of 1921, 622 households.

In the summer of 1941, the villages of then District of Vrginmost suffered heavy loss of civilian life with several hundred ethnic Serb men and boys perishing in the Glina massacre on 3 August 1941. Majority of the victims of the August massacre in Glina were from the villages of Blatuša, Podgorje, Crevarska Strana, Slavsko Polje, Brnjavac, Pješčanica, Gornja Čemernica, Donja Čemernica, Bukovica and Batinova Kosa.

The Ostrožin Rulebook (Croatian: Ostrožinski pravilnik) was adopted on 14 December 1941 in the village of Ostrožin. Predating the Foča Regulations by more than a month, the Ostrožin Rulebook was the first legal act which regulated the new national authority in the liberated territories during the National Liberation War of Yugoslavia.

In 1942, Andrija Artuković ordered the killing of the entire population of Vrginmost and its surrounding villages in 1942, according to the charges laid against him in his deportation hearings in the United States.

The town was officially known as Gvozd between 1996 and 23 October 2012. In 2012, its original name of Vrginmost was restored amid political controversy.

During the Croatian War of Independence, Vrginmost was a part of the unrecognized breakaway Republic of Serbian Krajina. It was retaken by the Croatian army during Operation Storm.

== Demographics ==
=== Settlements ===
The municipality consists of 19 settlements:

- Blatuša, population 171
- Bović, population 91
- Brnjavac, population 93
- Crevarska Strana, population 161
- Čremušnica, population 103
- Dugo Selo Lasinjsko, population 46
- Golinja, population 38
- Gornja Čemernica, population 142
- Gornja Trstenica, population 88
- Kirin, population 52
- Kozarac, population 122
- Ostrožin, population 32
- Pješčanica, population 161
- Podgorje, population 150
- Slavsko Polje, population 338
- Stipan, population 50
- Šljivovac, population 32
- Trepča, population 5
- Vrginmost (Gvozd at the time of census), population 1,095

Population of Gvozd municipality by ethnicity

Year of census	total	Serbs	Croats	Yugoslavs	others
2011	2,970	1,976 (66.53%)	951 (32.02%)	-	43 (1.45%)
2001	3,779	2,193 (58.03%)	1,500 (39.69%)	-	86 (2.28%)
1991	16,599	11,729 (70.66%)	4,043 (24.36%)	278 (1.68%)	549 (3.31%)
1981	18,841	13,450 (71.39%)	4,130 (21.92%)	871 (4.62%)	390 (2.07%)
1971	21,536	16,337 (75.86%)	4,866 (22.60%)	184 (0.85%)	149 (0.69%)

NOTE: Historically, the municipality was known as Vrginmost until 1996, when both the municipality and the settlement were renamed to Gvozd. The old municipality of Vrginmost was divided into three new municipalities: Topusko, Lasinja and Gvozd.

Population of Vrginmost settlement by ethnicity

Year of census	total	Serbs	Croats	Yugoslavs	others
2011	1,095	322 (29.41%)	755 (68.95%)	-	18 (1.64%)
2001	1,303	n/a	n/a	-	n/a
1991	1,570	1,403 (89.36%)	47 (2.99%)	42 (2.68%)	78 (4.97%)
1981	1,403	1,185 (84.46%)	44 (3.14%)	125 (8.91%)	49 (3.49%)
1971	1,068	929 (86.99%)	65 (6.09%)	34 (3.18%)	40 (3.74%)

NOTE: The settlement is historically known as Vrginmost. During the 1996-2012 period, the settlement was known as Gvozd

Historical population of Vrginmost settlement 1857-2011
v

population	341	380	368	447	460	707	451	765	733	465	840	1068	1403	1570	1303	1095
	1857	1869	1880	1890	1900	1910	1921	1931	1948	1953	1961	1971	1981	1991	2001	2011

Sources: Croatian Bureau of Statistics publications

=== History ===
The municipality had big population changes in various censuses, possibly because of war and because of frequent border changes of municipalities in Croatia:

- In the 2001 census there were 3,779 people in the municipality, 58% of whom were ethnic Serbs and 40% Croats. 3,575 declared their mother tongue as Croatian, 155 as Serbian, and 49 as other languages.

== Politics ==
=== Minority councils and representatives ===
Directly elected minority councils and representatives are tasked with consulting tasks for the local or regional authorities in which they are advocating for minority rights and interests, integration into public life and participation in the management of local affairs. At the 2023 Croatian national minorities councils and representatives elections Serbs of Croatia fulfilled legal requirements to elect 10 members minority council of the Municipality of Gvozd.

== Sights and events ==
- Monument to the Uprising of the People of Kordun and Banija
- Monument to the Antifascist Uprising and Victims of Fascism - a bronze partisan sculpture by sculptor Zvonko Car erected in 1956. According to the witness' statements, the monument was destroyed and its remains removed from the site in Vrginmost around 26 November 1995. Fragments of the monument's decorative mosaic featuring partisans had been recovered from garbage disposal site.
- Abez Forest - site of the historical meeting, held on 19 July 1941, at which the leadership of the Croatian branch of the Communist Party of Yugoslavia decided that the people of the Kordun and Banija region raise against the nazi-fascist occupation
- Site of formation of the partisan 8th Kordun Division (Croatian: 8. Kordunaška udarna divizija NOVJ) on 22 November 1942 in Crevarska Strana8. кордунашка дивизија НОВЈ
- Đedova kosidba - cultural and historical, tourist manifestation held in Vrginmost, nurturing the folk customs and traditions of Kordun and traditional ways of life. The one-day event, which was first held in 2010, takes place between May and late June and brings together amateur groups nurturing traditional folk dancing and singing from different regions of Croatia and north-west of Bosnia and Herzegovina.

== Notable natives and residents ==
- Ognjeslav Utješinović Ostrožinski (1817–1890) - politician and writer
- Gavrilo von Rodić (1812–1890) - general and high ranking state official in the Habsburg monarchy
- Stephan von Ljubičić (1855–1935) - general in the Austro-Hungarian army and decorated military commander
- Rade Bulat (1920–2013) - Yugoslav communist, antifascist, partisan general, electrical engineer and People's Hero of Yugoslavia
- Branko Mamula (1921-2021) - antifascist and partisan fighter, admiral of the JNA, Minister of Defence of Yugoslavia from 1982 to 1988
- Mile Mrkšić (1947–2015) - JNA colonel, convicted by the ICTY of failing to prevent war crimes against POWs during the 1991-1995 war in Croatia
- Pavle Jakšić (1913–2005) - physicist, antifascist, partisan general, Chief of Staff of the 4th Yugoslav Army and People's Hero of Yugoslavia
- Gojko Nikoliš (1911–1995) - medical doctor, historian, volunteer in International Brigades in Spanish Civil War, partisan general, the first Head of the Partisan Medical Corps, member of SANU and People's Hero of Yugoslavia. National deputy for the district of Vrginmost.
- Ankica Barbir-Mladinović (born 1949) - journalist, TV Zagreb/HTV news editor and the youngest editor of "Zagrebačka panorama"
- ITD Band - the first members of the Croatian/Yugoslav pop rock band were Vrginmost natives and residents: Branislav Bekić (vocals), Milan Bekić (bass guitar) and Nebojša Tepšić (drums). Rastislav Topoljski (keyboards), who joined the band later on, was another Vrginmost resident, while Jadranko Mileusnić (guitar) was a native of Vojnić.
- Aleksandar Raković (born 1968) - race walker and Olympian athlete

== See also ==
- Glina massacres
