= Utolica =

Coordinates: 45°14′52″N 16°38′56″E

- Village
- Interactive map of Utolica
- Country: Croatia
- Region: Continental Croatia (Banovina)
- County: Sisak-Moslavina
- Municipality: Hrvatska Kostajnica

Area
  - Total: 17.0 km^{2} (6.6 sq mi)

Population (2021)
  - Total: 43
  - Density: 2.5/km^{2} (6.6/sq mi)
- Time zone: UTC+1 (CET)
  - Summer (DST): UTC+2 (CEST)

Utolica is a village in Croatia.
