= Hinko Hinković =

Croatian lawyer and politician (1854–1929)

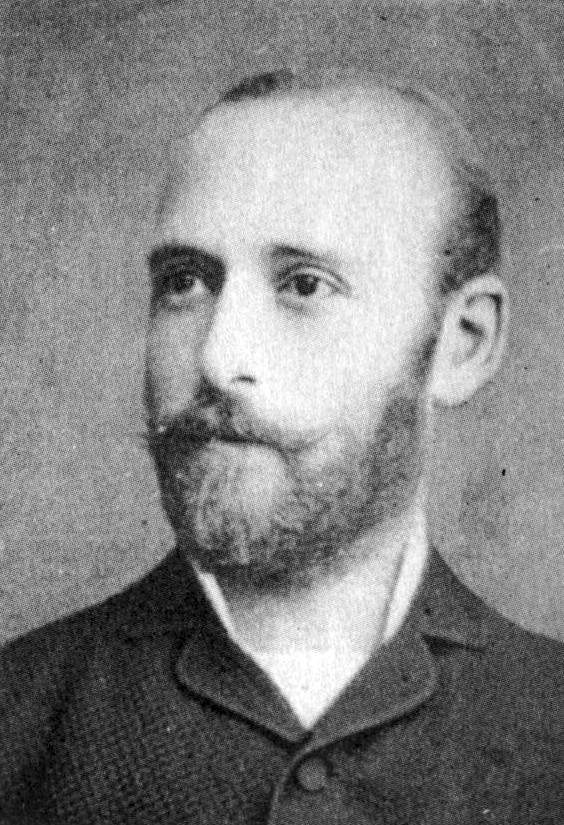
- Born: Heinrich Moses; 11 September 1854; Vinica, Austrian Empire, (now Croatia)
- Died: 3 September 1929 (aged 74); Zagreb, Kingdom of Yugoslavia, (now Croatia)
- Occupations: Lawyer, publisher, politician

Hinko Hinković (born Heinrich Moses; 11 September 1854 – 3 September 1929) was a Croatian lawyer, publisher and politician.

== Biography ==
Hinković was born in Vinica on 11 September 1854 to a Croatian-Jewish family as Heinrich Moses. He was the member of Party of Rights, one of the closest associates of Ante Starčević and member of the Freemasonry Scottish Rite. Hinković was editor of the party paper "Sloboda" (Freedom).

In November 1879, he published an article "Fiat lux!" in which he advocated a political rapprochement with the Serbs. In 1884, Hinković was elected as the Party of Rights representative in the Croatian Parliament. In the parliament, Hinković addressed King Franz Joseph I of Austria. He emphasised the sovereignty of the Croatian people, condemned the Austro-Hungarian dualism, argued to waive the legality of the Croatian-Hungarian Settlement, called for the unification of the lands of Croatia and Slavonia, Military Frontier, Dalmatia, Bosnia and Herzegovina and the Slovenia, protested against the excessive fortune and other abuses and condemned civil servants who turned into blind Hungarian government agitators and sowed discord among the Croats and Serbs.

In 1886, he came into conflict with Starčević and later left the party. In 1905, Hinković was one of the founders of the Croat-Serb Coalition. In 1909, he was the defense attorney in the infamous Agram Trial.

During World War I, he resided in exile and worked as a member of the Yugoslav Committee. During his time in the United States, Hinković has developed a strong propaganda against the Austro-Hungarian Empire and for the creation of the state of Yugoslavia. He authored numerous anticlerical brochures, spiritualist papers and anti-Austrian brochures, which were printed both in French and English. Although he converted to the Roman Catholic faith, he identified with Judaism until the day he died.

Hinković died on 3 September 1929 in Zagreb and is interred at the Mirogoj Cemetery.

== Sources ==
- Kraus, Ognjen (1998). Dva stoljeća povijesti i kulture Židova u Zagrebu i Hrvatskoj. Zagreb: Židovska općina Zagreb. ISBN 953-96836-2-9.
- Hinković, Hinko (1927). Iz velikog doba : moj rad i moji doživljaji za vrijeme svjetskog rata. Zagreb: Komisionalna naklada Ćirilo-Metodske nakladne knjižare.
- Goldstein, Ivo (2005). Židovi u Zagrebu 1918 - 1941. Zagreb: Novi Liber. ISBN 953-6045-23-0.
