= Dugo Selo Lasinjsko =

Dugo Selo Lasinjsko Дуго Село Ласињско (Serbian)
- Village
- Location of Dugo Selo Lasinjsko in Croatia
- Coordinates: 45°28′N 15°54′E
- Country: Croatia
- Region: Continental Croatia
- County: Sisak-Moslavina County
- Municipality: Gvozd

Area
  - Total: 21.4 km^{2} (8.3 sq mi)
- Elevation: 202 m (663 ft)

Population (2021)
  - Total: 31
  - Density: 1.4/km^{2} (3.8/sq mi)
- Time zone: UTC+1 (CET)
  - Summer (DST): UTC+2 (CEST)
- Postal code: 44410
- Area code: (+385) 44

Dugo Selo Lasinjsko (Serbian Cyrillic: Дуго Село Ласињско) is a village in central Croatia, in the municipality of Gvozd, Sisak-Moslavina County.

== History ==
During the WWII Genocide of Serbs by the Croatian fascist Ustaše regime, on 21 December 1941, hundreds of Serbs from Dugo Selo Lasinjsko were taken to the Brezje forest and massacred.

== Demographics ==
According to the 2011 census, the village of Dugo Selo Lasinjsko has 46 inhabitants. This represents 11.95% of its pre-war population according to the 1991 census.

According to the 1991 census, 91.17% of the village population were ethnic Serbs (351/385), 1.30% were ethnic Croats (5/385), while 7.53% were of other ethnic origin (29/385).

Population change 1857-2011
v

| population | 650 | 786 | 767 | 943 | 990 | 1025 | 908 | 1108 | 653 | 720 | 676 | 599 | 507 | 385 | 64 | 46 |
| | 1857 | 1869 | 1880 | 1890 | 1900 | 1910 | 1921 | 1931 | 1948 | 1953 | 1961 | 1971 | 1981 | 1991 | 2001 | 2011 |

Sources: Croatian Bureau of Statistics publications
