= Pješčanica =

Pješčanica Пјешчаница (Serbian)
- Village
- Location of Pješčanica in Croatia
- Coordinates: 45°22′34″N 15°53′00″E
- Country: Croatia
- Region: Central and Eastern (Pannonian) Croatia
- County: Sisak-Moslavina County
- Municipality: Gvozd

Area
  - Total: 18.9 km^{2} (7.3 sq mi)
- Elevation: 164 m (538 ft)

Population (2021)
  - Total: 80
  - Density: 4.2/km^{2} (11/sq mi)
- Time zone: UTC+1 (CET)
  - Summer (DST): UTC+2 (CEST)
- Postal code: 44410
- Area code: (+385) 44

Pješčanica (Serbian Cyrillic: Пјешчаница) is a village in central Croatia, in the municipality of Gvozd, Sisak-Moslavina County. It is connected by the D6 highway.

== Demographics ==
According to the 2011 census, the village of Pješčanica has 161 inhabitants. This represents 24.36% of its pre-war population according to the 1991 census.

Population by ethnicity

Year of census	total	Serbs	Croats	Yugoslavs	others
2011	161	138 (85.71%)	20 (12.42%)	-	3 (1.87%)
2001	222	n/a	n/a	-	n/a
1991	661	651 (98.49%)	3 (0.45%)	4 (0.61%)	3 (0.45%)
1981	939	911 (97.02%)	3 (0.32%)	11 (1.17%)	14 (1.49%)
1971	1135	1124 (99.03%)	3 (0.26%)	-	8 (0.71%)

Historical population 1857-2011
v

population	1143	1234	1079	1298	1279	1360	1412	1440	1227	1263	1225	1135	939	661	222	161
	1857	1869	1880	1890	1900	1910	1921	1931	1948	1953	1961	1971	1981	1991	2001	2011

Sources: Croatian Bureau of Statistics publications
