= Gornja Trstenica =

Gornja Trstenica Горња Трстеница (Serbian)
- Village
- Location of Gornja Trstenica in Croatia
- Coordinates: 45°23′41″N 15°57′14″E
- Country: Croatia
- Region: Continental Croatia
- County: Sisak-Moslavina County
- Municipality: Gvozd

Area
  - Total: 14.1 km^{2} (5.4 sq mi)
- Elevation: 188 m (617 ft)

Population (2021)
  - Total: 38
  - Density: 2.7/km^{2} (7.0/sq mi)
- Time zone: UTC+1 (CET)
  - Summer (DST): UTC+2 (CEST)
- Postal code: 44410
- Area code: (+385) 44

Gornja Trstenica (Serbian Cyrillic: Горња Трстеница) is a village in central Croatia, in the municipality of Gvozd, Sisak-Moslavina County. It is connected by the D6 highway.

== Demographics ==
According to the 2011 census, the village of Gornja Trstenica has 88 inhabitants. This represents 29.43% of its pre-war population according to the 1991 census.

According to the 1991 census, 99.00% of the village population were ethnic Serbs (296/299), 0.33% were ethnic Croats (1/299), while 0.67% were of other ethnic origin (2/299).

Population change 1857-2011
v

population	540	607	521	614	700	682	626	806	661	684	671	558	441	299	102	88
	1857	1869	1880	1890	1900	1910	1921	1931	1948	1953	1961	1971	1981	1991	2001	2011

Sources: Croatian Bureau of Statistics publications
