= Bović =

Bović Бовић (Serbian)
- Village
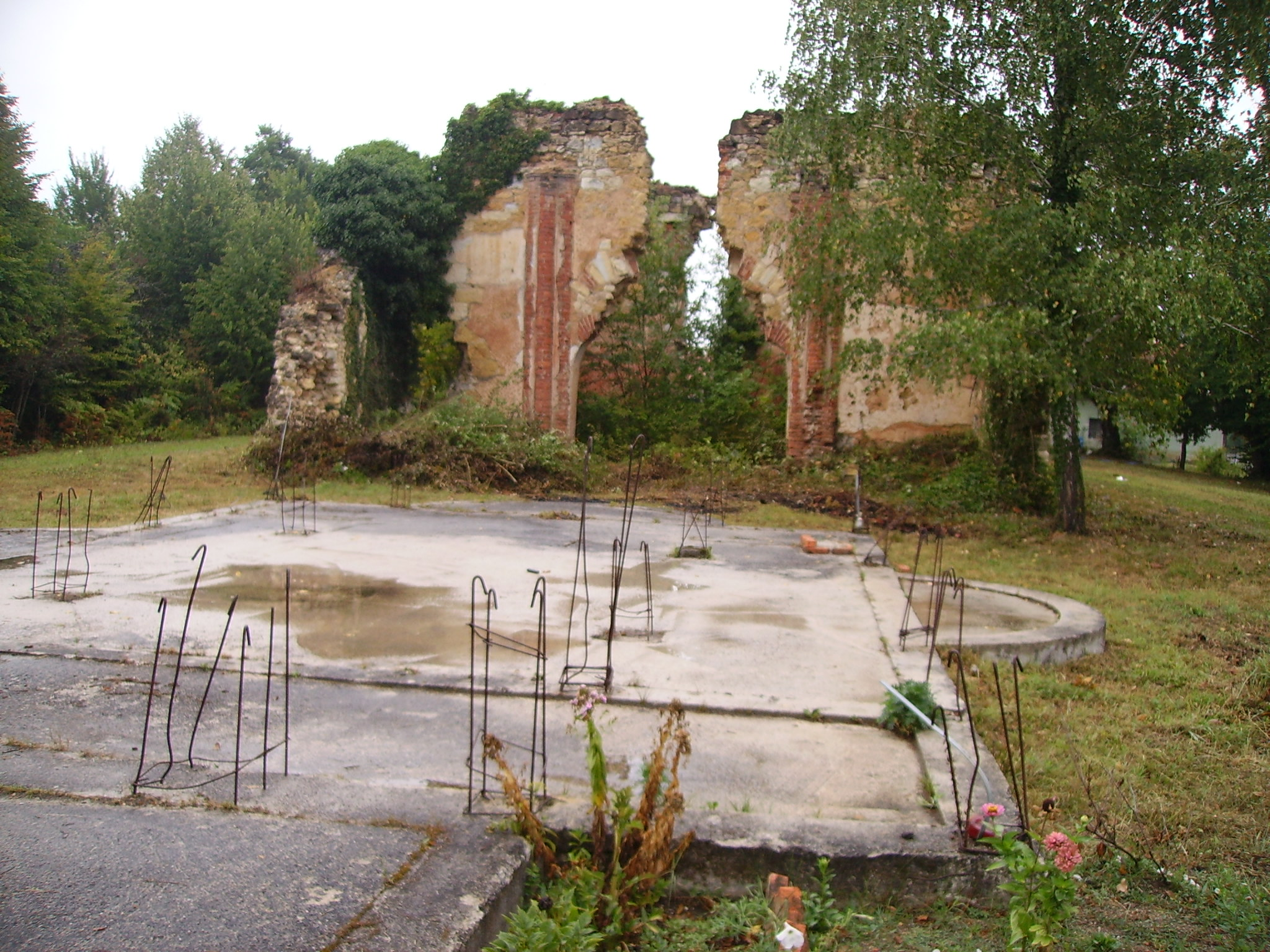
- Ruins of the Orthodox church of Christ's Resurrection in Bović

- Location of Bović in Croatia
- Coordinates: 45°25′35″N 15°56′14″E
- Country: Croatia
- Region: Continental Croatia
- County: Sisak-Moslavina County
- Municipality: Gvozd

Area
  - Total: 7.1 km^{2} (2.7 sq mi)
- Elevation: 204 m (669 ft)

Population (2021)
  - Total: 59
  - Density: 8.3/km^{2} (22/sq mi)
- Time zone: UTC+1 (CET)
  - Summer (DST): UTC+2 (CEST)
- Postal code: 44410 Gvozd
- Area code: (+385) 44

Bović (Serbian Cyrillic: Бовић) is a village in central Croatia, in the municipality of Gvozd, Sisak-Moslavina County. It is connected by the D6 highway.

== Demographics ==
According to the 2011 census, the village of Bović has 91 inhabitants. This represents 29.07% of its pre-war population, according to the 1991 census.

According to the 1991 census, 97.13% of the village population were ethnic Serbs (304/313), 0.95% were ethnic Croats (3/313), while 1.92% were of other ethnic origin (6/313).

Population change 1857-2011
v

population	553	575	571	667	722	731	760	818	364	543	453	414	355	313	150	91
	1857	1869	1880	1890	1900	1910	1921	1931	1948	1953	1961	1971	1981	1991	2001	2011

Sources: Croatian Bureau of Statistics publications
