= Vrginmost, Gvozd =

Settlement in Sisak-Moslavina County, Croatia

Vrginmost
- Settlement
- Interactive map of Vrginmost
- Location of Vrginmost in Croatia
- Coordinates: 45°21′16″N 15°52′34″E
- Country: Croatia
- County: Sisak-Moslavina
- Municipality: Gvozd

Area
  - Total: 4.5 km^{2} (1.7 sq mi)

Population (2021)
  - Total: 860
  - Density: 190/km^{2} (490/sq mi)
- Time zone: UTC+1 (CET)
  - Summer (DST): UTC+2 (CEST)
- Postal code: 44410 Vrginmost
- Area code: +385 (0)44

Vrginmost is a settlement in the Municipality of Gvozd in Croatia. In 2021, its population was 860.

== Demographics ==
Vrginmost: Population trends 1857–2021
v

population	341	380	368	447	460	707	451	765	733	465	840	1068	1403	1570	1303	1095	860
	1857	1869	1880	1890	1900	1910	1921	1931	1948	1953	1961	1971	1981	1991	2001	2011	2021

Sources: Croatian Bureau of Statistics publications
