= Stipan, Croatia =

Stipan Стипан (Serbian)
- Village
- Location of Stipan in Croatia
- Coordinates: 45°27′29″N 15°52′28″E
- Country: Croatia
- Region: Continental Croatia
- County: Sisak-Moslavina County
- Municipality: Gvozd

Area
  - Total: 7.1 km^{2} (2.7 sq mi)
- Elevation: 182 m (597 ft)

Population (2021)
  - Total: 22
  - Density: 3.1/km^{2} (8.0/sq mi)
- Time zone: UTC+1 (CET)
  - Summer (DST): UTC+2 (CEST)
- Postal code: 44410
- Area code: (+385) 44

Stipan (Serbian Cyrillic: Стипан) is a village in central Croatia, in the municipality of Gvozd, Sisak-Moslavina County. It is connected by the D6 highway.

== Demographics ==
According to the 2011 census, the village of Stipan has 50 inhabitants. This represents 21.93% of its pre-war population according to the 1991 census.

Population by ethnicity

Year of census	total	Serbs	Croats	Yugoslavs	others
2011	50	n/a	n/a	-	n/a
2001	41	n/a	n/a	-	n/a
1991	228	201 (88.16%)	5 (2.19%)	5 (2.19%)	17 (7.46%)
1981	319	301 (94.36%)	2 (0.62%)	11 (3.45%)	5 (1.57%)
1971	451	447 (99.11%)	3 (0.67%)	-	1 (0.22%)

Population change 1857-2011
v

population	361	490	427	525	543	623	611	724	577	562	547	451	319	228	41	50
	1857	1869	1880	1890	1900	1910	1921	1931	1948	1953	1961	1971	1981	1991	2001	2011

Sources: Croatian Bureau of Statistics publications

== Notable natives and residents ==
- Pete Romcevich (1906-1952)- American racing driver
- Nikola Vidović (1917-2000) - antifascist, partisan and People's Hero of Yugoslavia
