= Šljivovac, Croatia =

Šljivovac Шљивовац (Serbian)
- Village
- Location of Šljivovac in Croatia
- Coordinates: 45°27′00″N 15°53′18″E
- Country: Croatia
- Region: Central and Eastern (Pannonian) Croatia
- County: Sisak-Moslavina County
- Municipality: Gvozd

Area
  - Total: 4.8 km^{2} (1.9 sq mi)
- Elevation: 194 m (636 ft)

Population (2021)
  - Total: 6
  - Density: 1.3/km^{2} (3.2/sq mi)
- Time zone: UTC+1 (CET)
  - Summer (DST): UTC+2 (CEST)
- Postal code: 44410
- Area code: (+385) 44

Šljivovac (Serbian Cyrillic: Шљивовац) is a village in central Croatia, in the municipality of Gvozd, Sisak-Moslavina County. It is connected by the D6 highway.

== Demographics ==
According to the 2011 census, the village of Šljivovac has 32 inhabitants. This represents 18.94% of its pre-war population according to the 1991 census.

Population by ethnicity

Year of census	total	Serbs	Croats	Yugoslavs	others
2011	32	n/a	n/a	n/a	n/a
2001	33	n/a	n/a	n/a	n/a
1991	169	167 (98.82%)	-	2 (1.18%)	-
1981	253	222 (87.75%)	1 (0.39%)	28 (11.07%)	2 (0.79%)
1971	333	331 (99.40%)	-	1 (0.30%)	1 (0.30%)

Population change 1857-2011
v

population	490	528	508	588	613	695	712	689	511	491	376	333	253	169	33	32
	1857	1869	1880	1890	1900	1910	1921	1931	1948	1953	1961	1971	1981	1991	2001	2011

Sources: Croatian Bureau of Statistics publications
