= Jamnica Pisarovinska =

Coordinates: 45°35′N 15°52′E

- Village
- Interactive map of Jamnica Pisarovinska
- Country: Croatia
- County: Zagreb County

Area
  - Total: 1.7 km^{2} (0.66 sq mi)

Population (2021)
  - Total: 64
  - Density: 38/km^{2} (98/sq mi)
- Time zone: UTC+1 (CET)
  - Summer (DST): UTC+2 (CEST)

Jamnica Pisarovinska is a village in Croatia.
