= Šljivovac, Kragujevac =

Šljivovac Шљивовац (Serbian)
- Village (Selo)
- Location within Serbia
- Coordinates: 44°03′N 20°50′E
- Country: Serbia
- District: Šumadija
- City: Kragujevac

Population (2011)
  - Total: 417
- Time zone: UTC+1 (CET)
  - Summer (DST): UTC+2 (CEST)

Šljivovac (Serbian: Шљивовац), formerly Šljivovo Selo, is a village in the Kragujevac city area in the Šumadija District, Serbia. According to the 2011 census there were 417 inhabitants.
