= Podgorje, Sisak-Moslavina County =

Podgorje Подгорје (Serbian)
- Village
- Location of Podgorje in Croatia
- Coordinates: 45°20′19″N 15°51′31″E
- Country: Croatia
- Region: Central and Eastern (Pannonian) Croatia
- County: Sisak-Moslavina County
- Municipality: Gvozd

Area
  - Total: 6.1 km^{2} (2.4 sq mi)
- Elevation: 203 m (666 ft)

Population (2021)
  - Total: 130
  - Density: 21/km^{2} (55/sq mi)
- Time zone: UTC+1 (CET)
  - Summer (DST): UTC+2 (CEST)
- Postal code: 44410
- Area code: (+385) 44

Podgorje (Serbian Cyrillic: Подгорје) is a village in central Croatia, in the municipality of Gvozd, Sisak-Moslavina County. It is connected by the D6 highway.

== Demographics ==
According to the 2011 census, the village of Podgorje has 150 inhabitants. This represents 53.00% of its pre-war population according to the 1991 census.

Population by ethnicity

Year of census	total	Serbs	Croats	Yugoslavs	others
2011	150	126 (84.00%)	23 (15.33%)	-	1 (0.67%)
2001	178	n/a	n/a	-	n/a
1991	283	270 (95.41%)	2 (0.71%)	8 (2.83%)	3 (1.05%)
1981	405	387 (95.56%)	4 (0.99%)	9 (2.22%)	5 (1.23%)
1971	542	538 (99.26%)	3 (0.55%)	-	1 (0.19%)

Population change 1857-2011
v

population	468	492	447	527	581	659	681	705	474	456	544	542	405	283	178	150
	1857	1869	1880	1890	1900	1910	1921	1931	1948	1953	1961	1971	1981	1991	2001	2011

Sources: Croatian Bureau of Statistics publications
