= Milan Pribićević =

Yugoslav political activist

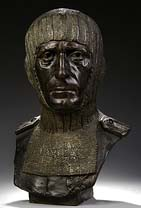
- Modern Crusader by Malvina Hoffman, modelled on Pribićević
- Born: 1876; Brod na Savi, Croatia-Slavonia, Austria-Hungary (now Slavonski Brod, Croatia)
- Died: 8 March 1937 (aged 60–61); Montreux, Switzerland
- Spouse: Ruža Pribićević
- Relatives: brothers Svetozar, Adam, and Valerijan
- Military career
- Allegiance: Kingdom of Serbia; Kingdom of Yugoslavia
- Rank: Colonel
- Awards: Order of Karađorđe's Star

Milan Pribićević (Serbian Cyrillic: Милан Прибићевић) was a Yugoslav political activist who nominally led ORJUNA. He had three brothers, Svetozar Pribićević, Adam Pribićević and Valerijan Pribićević, and nephew Stoyan Pribichevich, all of them were writers and politically involved in everyday affairs. Pribićević was an officer in the Austro-Hungarian Army who defected to Serbia in 1904. In 1917, while on a recruiting mission for the Salonika Front in neutral United States, he modelled for Malvina Hoffman's "Modern Crusader".

Milan Pribićević died in 1937.
