= Adam Pribićević =

Yugoslav politician (1880–1957)

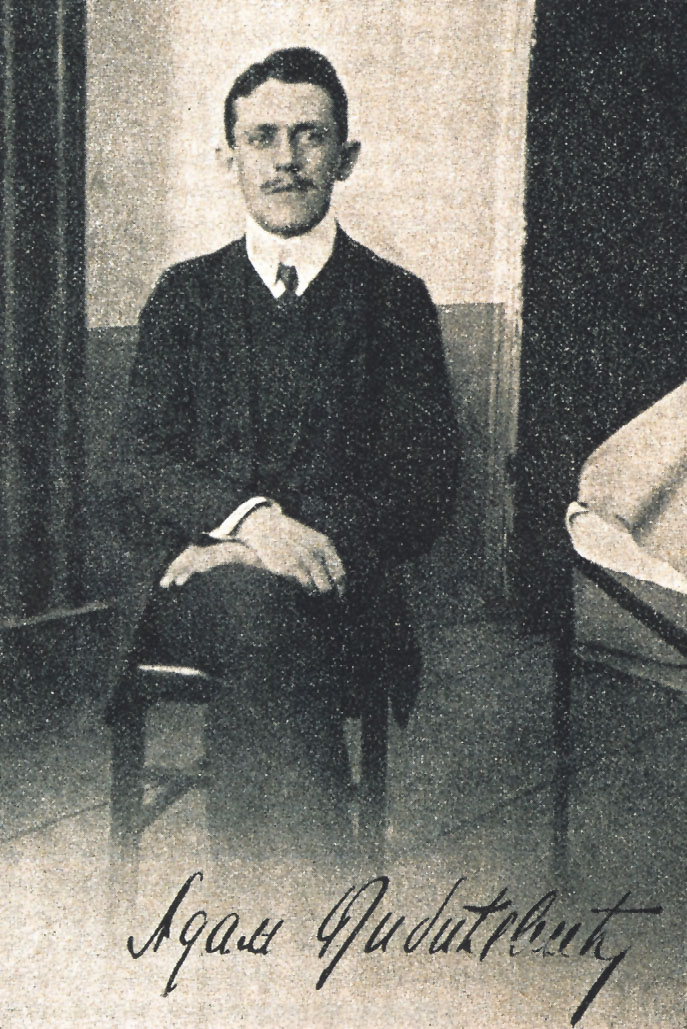
- Pribićević in the 1920s
- Born: 24 December 1880; Kostajnica, Croatia-Slavonia, Austria-Hungary
- Died: 7 February 1957 (aged 76); Windsor, Ontario, Canada
- Resting place: Batajnica Cemetery, Batajnica
- Family: Milan, Valerijan and Svetozar (brothers)

Adam Pribićević (Serbian Cyrillic: Адам Прибићевић; 24 December 1880 - 7 February 1957) was a Serbian Canadian publisher, writer, and politician.

== Biography ==
Pribićević was born in Kostajnica, to a well-known family of Serbs of Croatia. After graduating from gymnasium (high school) in Sremski Karlovci, he studied law at Zagreb. He began his political activities by joining the Serb Independent Party. He published articles in the periodicals Srbobran and Srpsko kolo. A supporter of the social philosophy of Tomáš Garrigue Masaryk, Pribićević emphasized the role of peasants in the social development of Serbia.

Pribićević was arrested along with a group of Serbian politicians from the Kingdom of Croatia-Slavonia, as part of a conflict between the Croatian-Serbian Coalition and the Austro-Hungarian authorities. At the Agram Trial in 1909, he was sentenced to 12 years for treason. It became apparent that the evidence in the earlier trial had been fabricated with the foreknowledge of the Austro-Hungarian authorities. He was released from prison in April 1910.

After his release, Pribićević joined the editorial staff of Srpsko kolo. In 1913, he visited Belgrade where he forewarned Nikola Pašić about a compromise between the Croatian-Serbian Coalition in Habsburg Croatia and the Austrian government. He also worked as an editor of the periodical Narod. In 1924 he settled in Kosovo, where he was active in the Independent Democratic Party, founded by his brother Svetozar Pribičević. He also edited the periodical Reč. After the death of his brother Svetozar, Adam was elected to parliament in 1936. In 1938 he became chairman of the Independent Democratic Party. Between the two world wars, he held many important posts in the Kingdom of Yugoslavia.

During World War II, he went on a mission behind enemy lines in occupied Serbia to the HQ of General Mihailovich with Ivan Kovač, Vladimir Belajćić, accompanied by Zvonimir Vučković, that "caused British consternation"

Adam Pribićević was a jurist, journalist, and political activist who, with his brother Milan, became "the voice of return to the virtues of rural life" as exemplified in his work.

His books were banned by the Yugoslav communist government in 1947 up until the demise of communism in the early 1990s.

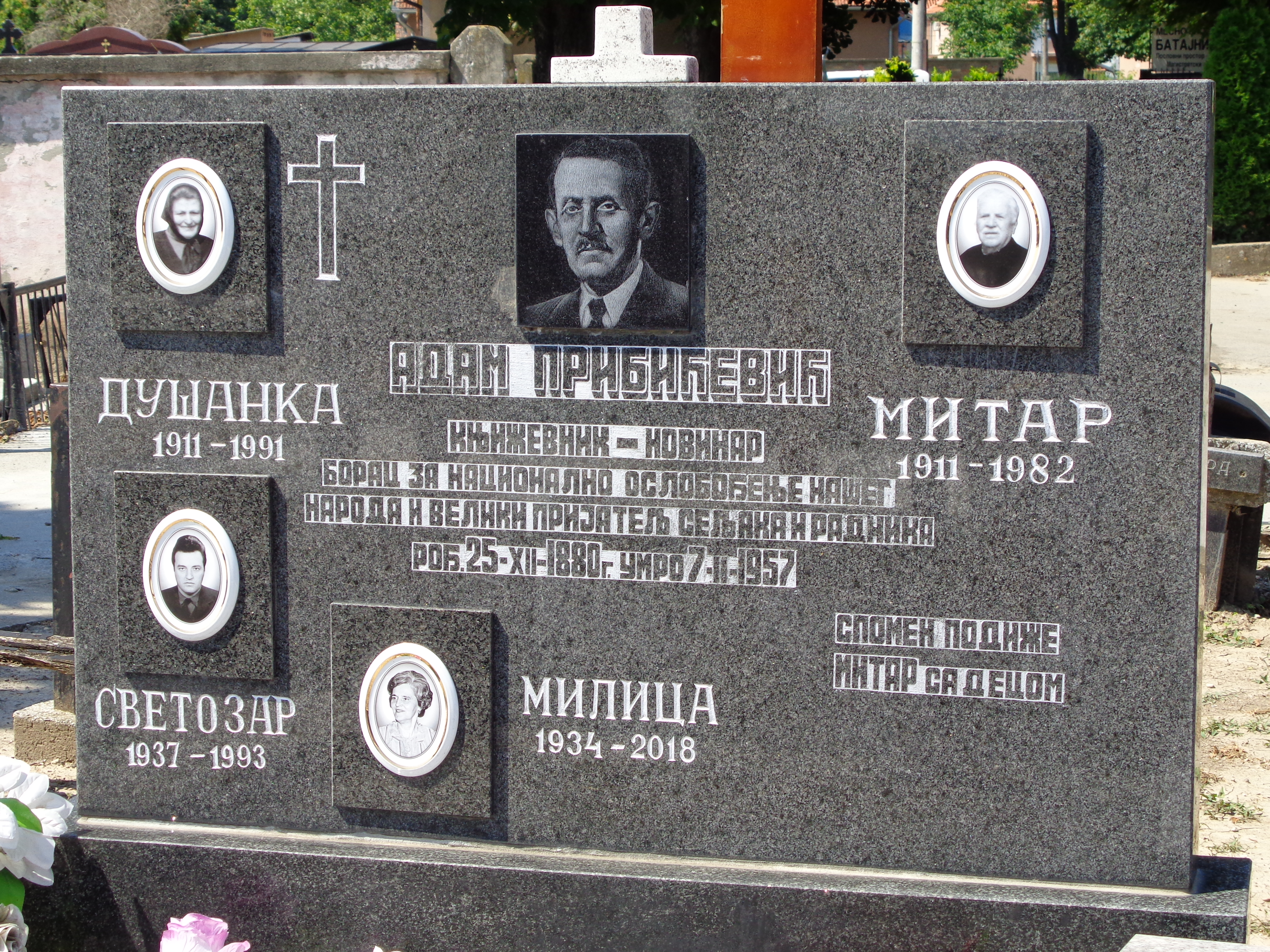
Grave of Adam Pribićević at Batajnica Cemetery

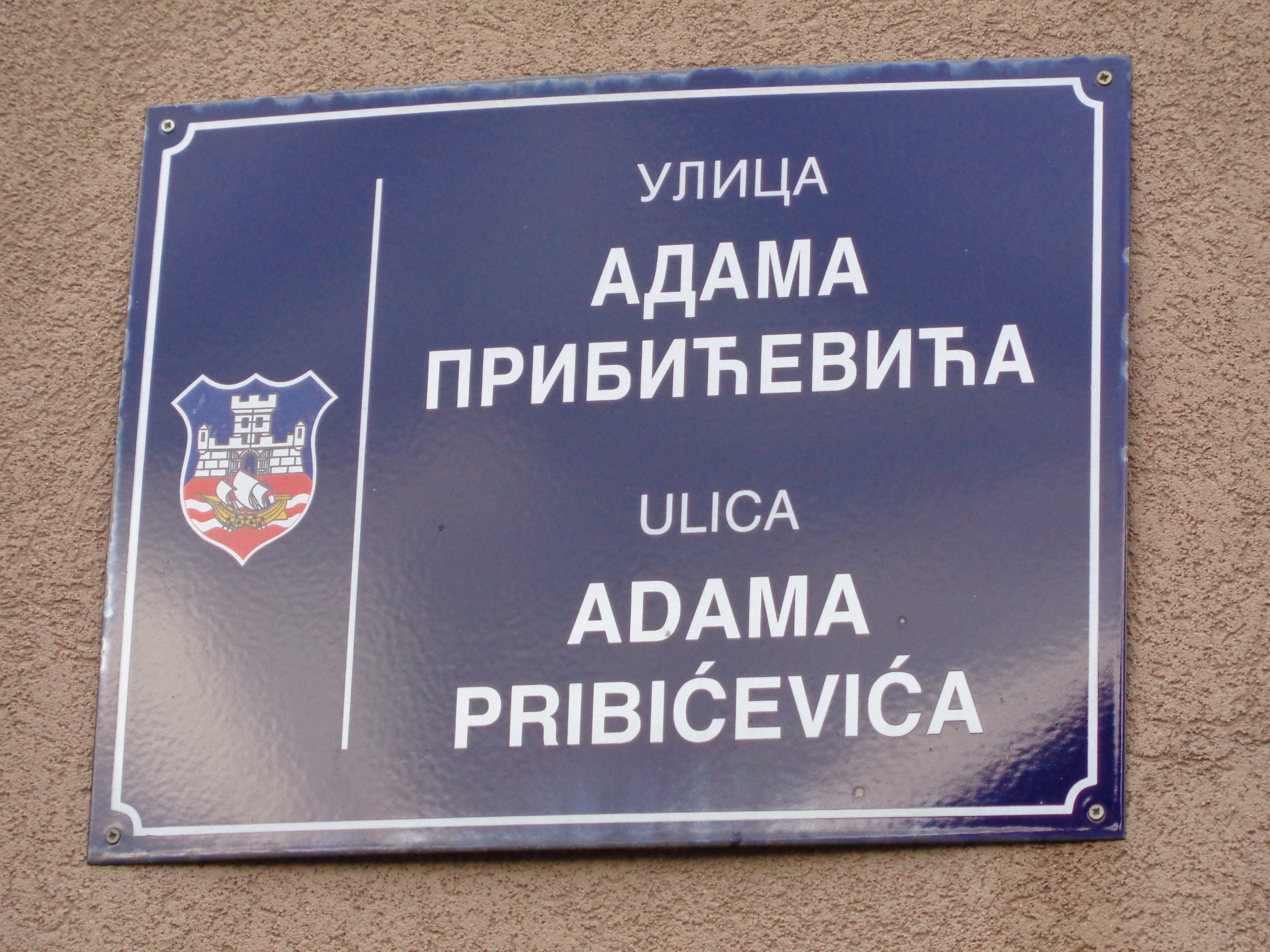
A street in Belgrade named after Pribićević

He committed suicide on 7 February 1957 in Windsor, Ontario.

In 2008, a new 16th street was named after him in Busije, a part of Belgrade.

== Personal life ==
He had three brothers: Milan, Svetozar and Valerijan.

== Works ==
- Seljak, 1936
- Naseljavanja Srba po Hrvatskoj i Dalmaciji, 1954
- Od gospodina do seljaka
- Selo kao moralni činilac u životu naroda, 1954
- The Problem of Austro-Hungaria, Voice of Canadian Serbs, 1949
- The Memorandum on Crimes of Genocide Committed against the Serbian People by the Government of the 'Independent State of Croatia' during World War II. Addressed to the Fifth General Assembly of the United Nations, 1950, by Adam Pribićević, Dr. Vladimir Belajčić, and Dr. Branko Miljuš.

== Sources ==
- Ćirković, Sima (2004). The Serbs. Malden: Blackwell Publishing. ISBN 9781405142915.
- Miller, Nicholas J. (1997). Between Nation and State: Serbian Politics in Croatia Before the First World War. Pittsburgh: University of Pittsburgh Press. ISBN 9780822977223.
- Chalou, George C. (December 1995). The Secret War: The Office of Strategic Services in World War II. DIANE Publishing. p. 198. ISBN 978-0-7881-2598-0.
